= Freccia IFV =

Italian wheeled infantry fighting vehicle

VBM Freccia
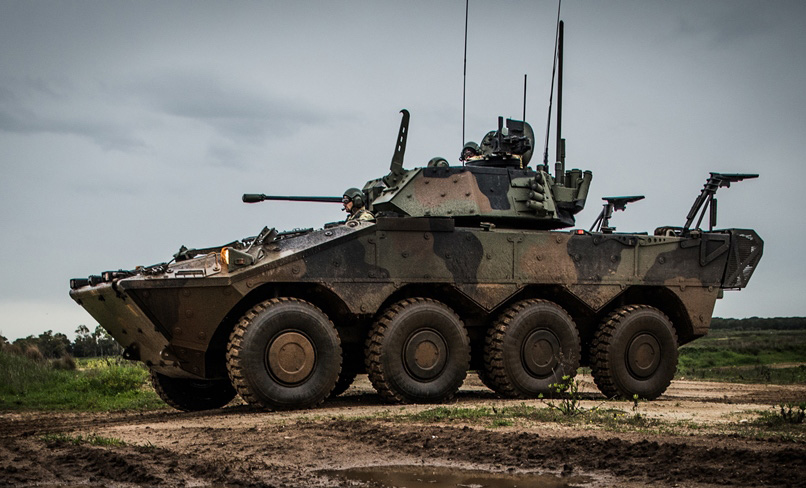
- A Freccia IFV of the Mechanized Brigade "Pinerolo"
- Type: 8×8 Armoured Fighting Vehicle
- Place of origin: Italy

Service history
- In service: Since 2008
- Used by: see Operators

Production history
- Designer: Iveco Defence Vehicles and OTO Melara
- Designed: 1996
- Manufacturer: Iveco Defence Vehicles and OTO Melara
- Unit cost: € 6 million in 2008 € 7 million in 2022
- Produced: Since 2002
- No. built: 283
- Variants: See Variants

The VBM - Freccia is a family of 8×8 armoured vehicles that was designed and manufactured for the Italian Army by Iveco Defence Vehicles for the hull, the engine and the suspension, and OTO Melara for the armament. The first variant to be developed was the IFV, the Freccia being equipped with a Hitfist turret, the same as the one installed on the VCC Dardo.

== Background ==
The Italian Army was looking for a successor to some of the Cold War era M113 variants in the Italian Army, among which the VCC-1 infantry fighting vehicle, the VCC-2 armoured personnel carrier and the M106 mortar carrier.

The VCC-1 IFV was replaced by the Dardo IFV. The Freccia was ordered to replace Cold War VCC-2 armoured personnel carriers of the Mechanized Brigade "Pinerolo" in Southern Italy.

A change in the doctrine for a more mobile vehicle was the reason behind the choice of a wheeled platform. And as a support to the infantry, a turret was selected to equip the successor of the VCC-2 APC variant, which increased the capabilities and the power of the infantry brigades. Some other variants such as command post vehicles, mortar carriers are also in use in the Italian Army.

Several batches have been ordered since the first one in 2006.

== Design ==
=== Design of the Freccia platform ===
The VBM – Freccia is a Medium Armoured Combat Vehicle ("Veicolo Blindato Medio Freccia"). It is an up-armoured variant of the Centauro (tactical reconnaissance and tank destroyer). It was designed by Iveco Defence Vehicles and OTO Melara with their own resources in order to meet the needs of the Italian Army. A first prototype was produced in 1996. Following a long test campaign, the Italian army selected this vehicle as the winner of the competition and placed a first order for 249 vehicles in 2006. In 2021, a contract was concluded for the design of a MLU of this first generation of vehicles.

After this first batch, the Italian Army needed additional vehicles to replace the specialised variants of the M113 in service.

The electronic architecture of the vehicle is designed according to the NATO General Vehicle Architecture (NGVA) STANAG 4754. This agreement focuses on making the architecture modular, easy and less costly to adapt. Applications can be added to the multi functional control unit as plug and play. It reduces the number of application specific control units, and therefore minimises the need for space and energy. The data, power, communication, sensors, effectors are all integrated according to this architecture. One of the element of this architecture is the SICCONA C2D command, control and navigation system, which includes NEC (Network Enabled Capability).

The main variant is the Infantry Fighting Vehicle, and the Anti Tank variant. Both are equipped with a Hitfist manned turret, which has a KBA 25 mm autocannon. For the anti-tank variant, the first variant is equipped with anti-tank missiles to be employed by the dismounted infantry. In the future, a Spike LR missile is to be integrated to the turret.

=== Upgrade to the Freccia PLUS Platform ===
Additional vehicles for reconnaissance and additional infantry fighting capabilities were needed to equip the infantry troops. Improvements on the Freccia platform were necessary to keep up with the new technologies.

The Freccia PLUS is a development of the Centauro 2. The main improvements include a new powertrain. The engine power is raised from 550 hp (410 kW) to 720 hp (540 kW), by modifying the engine to common rail direct injection, and preparing it for a future hybrid-electric propulsion system.

The armament capabilities are improved. The turret selected is the unmanned Hitfist OWS equipped with the Leonardo's X-GUN 30mm 30×173mm chain gun replacing the Oerlikon KBA 25 mm autocannon and can be equipped with anti-tank guided missiles mounted on the side of the turret. The Spike LR is the one used by the Italian Army. The turret is also equipped with a new fire control system. The thermal aiming for the gunner is supplied by Leonardo with the Lothar D (Land Optronic Thermal Aiming Resource). The commander gets a digital sight, and a mast with a panoramic sight is available especially for the reconnaissance variant, the Janus D also supplied by Leonardo.

As for the communications, Leonardo supplies the SWave VQ1 4-channel software defined radio which operates in the HF, VHF and UHF bands, plus a digital intercom system is available. The Italian Army variant is including it in its Network Enhanced Capability, known as the SICCONA C2D/N EVO which is to be expanded to the other armoured fighting vehicles.

The navigation system is using both the GPS signals and the Galileo PRS.

The Iron Fist hard-kill protection system has already been tested, a potential integration is being evaluated by the Italian Army. It would most likely be the Light-Decoupled Iron Fist (IF-LD).

== Variants ==
=== Operational variants ===
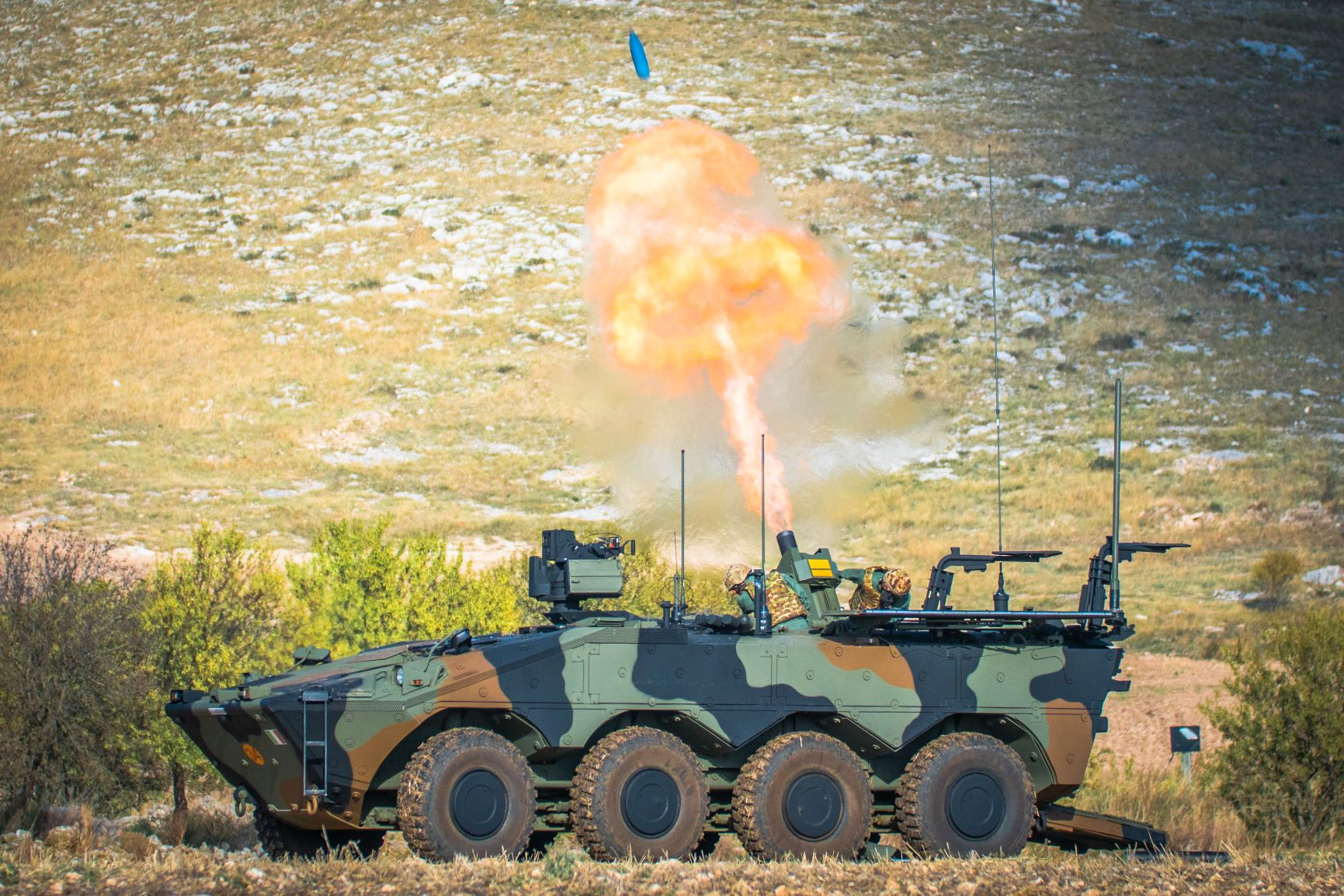
Freccia Mortar Carrier

Variants of the Freccia platform in service with the Italian Army.

- VBM da Combattimento (AIFV):
  An infantry fighting vehicle equipped with a two-man Hitfist turret with a KBA 25 mm autocannon.
- VBM Controcarro (ATGW):
  An infantry fighting vehicle equipped with a two-man Hitfist turret with a KBA 25 mm autocannon. Anti-tank guided missiles are included in the internal armament of the variant. A dual Spike LR anti-tank missile launcher will be added to the turret with the middle-life upgrade.
- VBM Porta Mortaio:
  A mortar carrier equipped with the TDA-2R2M 120 mm mortar system and a RCWS Hitrole L with a M2 Browning 12.7 mm NATO machine gun
- VBM Posto Comando:
  Two variants are in operation in the Italian Army
  - Veicolo Nucleo Comando (nu. Cdo):
    Used by the brigade commander, equipped with a RCWS Hitrole L which uses a heavy machine gun, the M2 Browning in 12.7 mm NATO. A C4 (command, control, communication and computer) installation is part of its equipment, and additional communication equipment compared to the base IFV variant. It has access to SATCOM, it is equipped with the SIACCON system (Italian Automated Information System for Command and Control), 3 servers, and 4 LRT350+ computer posts.
  - Veicolo Nucleo Tattico (nu. tat.):
    Vehicle used by the platoon commander. The base vehicle is the VBM da Combattimento (AIFV), equipped with a two-man Hitfist turret with a KBA 25 mm autocannon and the same C4 equipment as for the Veicolo Nucleo Comando is available in the armoured vehicle.

=== Future variants ===
The army plans to acquire 300 Freccia PLUS, 120 of which in the Reconnaissance variant. PLUS Combat:
With a remote Hitfist OWS turret with 30 mm autocannon and a Spike LR2 missile.

- Freccia PLUS Reconnaissance:
  With a remote Hitfist OWS turret with 30 mm autocannon and a Spike LR2 missile launcher, plus a Janus sensor mast.

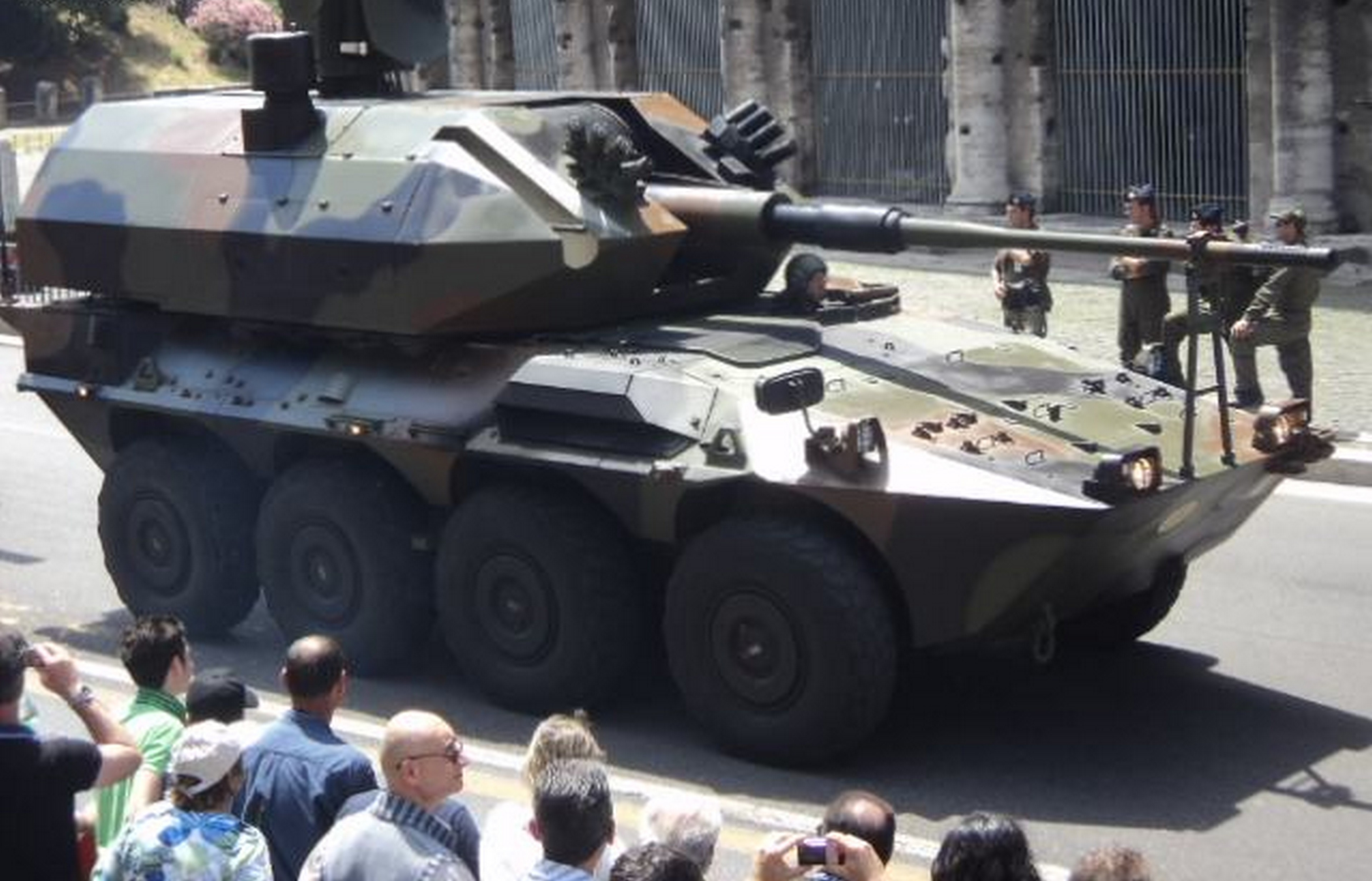
Centauro DRACO

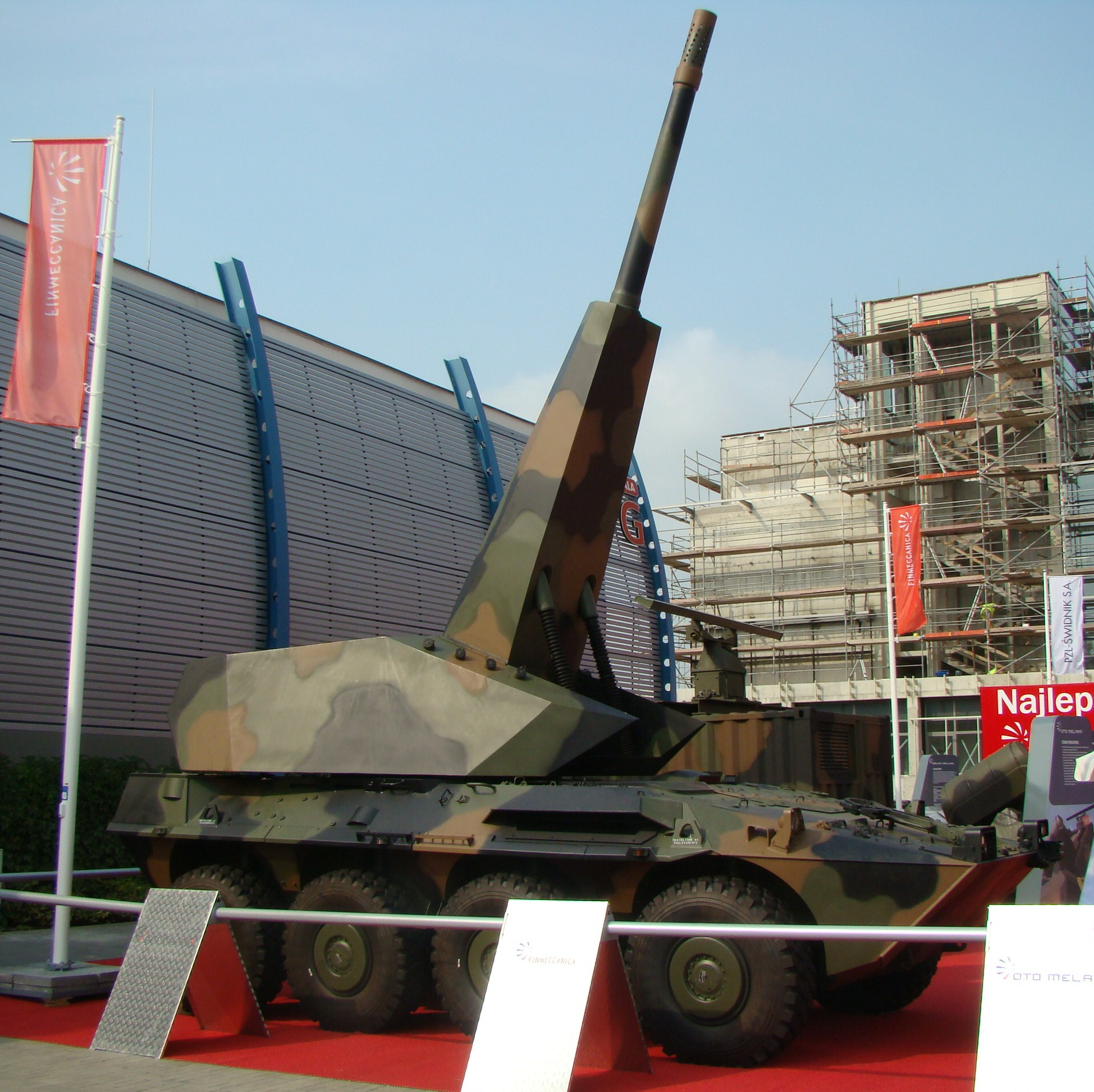
Centauro Porcupine

=== Prototypes ===
Prototypes based on both the Freccia and the Centauro common chassis:

- VBM Freccia APC:
  An armoured personnel carrier variant that was initially planned, but none have been ordered yet, and none are planned to be ordered by the Italian Army.
- VBC con torretta T60/70A:
  A variant equipped with a turret Hitfist on which a 60mm self-loading autocannon by OTO Melara is installed, expected to be used as an anti-armour vehicle, but it was never ordered.
- VBM Freccia Recupero:
  An armoured recovery vehicle.
- DRACO:
  A SPAAG (self-propelled anti-air gun) and anti-missile gun, based on the naval autocannon OTO-Melara 76 mm Super Rapido. It can also be used as C-RAM system with APFSDS(armor piercing fin stabilised discarding sabot) ammunition.
- Porcospino:
  The "Porcupine" is a self-propelled howitzer using a 155mm L/39 artillery gun.

=== Freccia (first phase) ===
Parameters	APC Armoured personnel carrier	IFV Infantry Fighting Vehicle	C2V Platoon Command Post	C2V Squadron Command Post	AMC Armoured Mortar Carrier	ARV Armoured Recovery Vehicle
	Dimensions					
Internal volume	13.5 m^{3} (480 ft^{3})	11.0 m^{3} (390 ft^{3})	11.0 m^{3} (390 ft^{3})	13.5 m^{3} (480 ft^{3})	13.5 m^{3} (480 ft^{3})	Crew 7 m^{3}Technical 6 m^{3}
Length	7.99 m (26.2 ft)	8.56 m (28.1 ft)	8.56 m (28.1 ft)	8.00 m (26.25 ft)	7.99 m (26.2 ft)	8.25 m (27.1 ft)
Height (hull)	2.01 m (6.6 ft)	2.04 m (6.7 ft)	2.04 m (6.7 ft)	2.04 m (6.7 ft)	2.90 m (9.5 ft)	2.04 m (6.7 ft)
Height (with turret)	2.25 m (7.4 ft)	3.18 m (10.4 ft)	3.22 m (10.6 ft)	3.00 m (9.84 ft)	—	2.75 m (9.0 ft)
Width	2.99 m (9.8 ft)					
	Mass					
Empty	19.5 t	22.0 t	22.0 t	20.6 t	21.5 t	23.0
Payload	10.5 t	8.0 t	8.0 t	8.0 t	8.5 t	7.0
GVW (max)	31.5 t					
	Weapon System / Mission Equipment					
Crew + passengers	3 + 10	3 + 8	3 + 3	3 + 4	3 to 5 crews	4
Main mission equipment	RWS Hitrole^{®}	Turret Hitfist^{®}	Turret Hitfist^{®}	RWS Hitrole^{®}	Thales 2R2M	Recovery equipment
Main mission equipment	40 mm grenade launcher /Machine gun heavy or medium	KBA 25 mm /Spike LR / Coaxial MG 7.62 mm	KBA 25 mm / Spike LR / Coaxial MG 7.62 mm	40 mm grenade launcher / Machine gun heavy or medium	Rifled Recoiled Mounted Mortar 120 mm	Hydraulic crane 245.2 kN·Main winch 30 t
	Vehicle performances					
Max speed	110 km/h (68 mph)					
Range on road	800 km (500 mi)					
Gradient / Side	60% (31.0°)					
Side slope	30% (16.7°)					
Step	0.6 m (2.0 ft)					
Trench	2.0 m (6.6 ft)					
Fording depth	1.5 m (4.9 ft)					
Turning radius	9.0 m (29.5 ft), with 3 steering axles (1st, 2nd, 4th)					
	Power train					
Engine performance	Engine, Iveco 8262 / Power 550 hp (410 kW) / Torque 2,000 N⋅m (1,500 lb⋅ft)					
Power / mass ratio	17.5 hp/t (13.0 kW/t) at GVW					
Transmission	Automatic, 5 front + 2 rear gars					
Driveline	Single-differential twin-shaft design (H-shaped driveline)					
Suspension	Hydro-pneumatic and independent suspension					
	Protection					
Hull	Hull made of high hardness monocoque steel and direct fire ballistic armour (ceramic).: Base level: steel with AMAP add-on armour for frontal armour against 30 mm APFSDS rounds, side armour against 14.5 mm AP rounds; Optional: up-armouring the sides against 30 mm APFSDS rounds					
Floor	V-shaped floot made of high hardness steel: Base level: anti-mine seats + anti-mine / IED floor withstanding up to 6 kg (13 lb) TNT equivalent; Optional: increase of the floor protection to withstand up to 8 kg (18 lb) TNT equivalent					
Optional systems	Smoke grenade launchers (8 × 80 mm) / NBC protection / IED active jamming protection suite / laser warning system / fire extinguishing system in the crew cabin					

== Current operators ==
=== Operators ===
Italy

Italian Army

- Mechanized Brigade "Pinerolo":
  - 9th Infantry Regiment "Bari"
  - 7th Bersaglieri Regiment
  - 82nd Infantry Regiment "Torino"
- Mechanized Brigade "Aosta"
  - 5th Infantry Regiment "Aosta"
  - 6th Bersaglieri Regiment
  - 62nd Infantry Regiment "Sicilia"
- Mechanized Brigade "Sassari":
  - 3rd Bersaglieri Regiment

=== Successful bids ===
==== Total orders expected ====
Italian Army (630)

Phase 1, delivered from 2007 to 2017 (249):
- 172 VBM Freccia da Combattimento (AIFV)
- 36 VBM Freccia Controcarro (ATGW)
- 20 VBM Freccia Posto Comando
  - 10 Nucleo Comando
  - 10 Nucleo Tattico
- 21 VBM Freccia Porta Mortaio
Phase 2, planned acquisitions from 2019 (381):
- 163 VBM Freccia da Combattimento (AIFV)
- 36 VBM Freccia Controcarro (ATGW)
- 120 VBM Freccia PLUS Esploranti
- 8 VBM Freccia Posto Comando
  - 4 Nucleo Comando
  - 4 Nucleo Tattico
- 14 VBM Freccia Porta Mortaio
- 40 VBM Freccia Recupero (10×10)

==== Detailed orders ====
Italian Army (401)

Phase 1, delivered from 2007 to 2017 (249):
- Tranche 1, €310 million (54):
  - 50 VBM Freccia da Combattimento (AIFV)
  - 1 VBM Freccia Controcarro (ATGW)
  - 2 VBM Freccia Posto Comando
    - 1 Nucleo Comando
    - 1 Nucleo Tattico
  - 1 VBM Freccia Porta Mortaio
- Tranche 2 (109):
  - 61 VBM Freccia da Combattimento (AIFV)
  - 24 VBM Freccia Controcarro (ATGW)
  - 12 VBM Freccia Posto Comando
    - 6 Nucleo Comando
    - 6 Nucleo Tattico
  - 12 VBM Freccia Porta Mortaio
- Tranche 3 (86):
  - 61 VBM Freccia da Combattimento (AIFV)
  - 11 VBM Freccia Controcarro (ATGW)
  - 6 VBM Freccia Posto Comando
    - 3 Nucleo Comando
    - 3 Nucleo Tattico
  - 8 VBM Freccia Porta Mortaio

Phase 2, confirmed acquisitions since 2019 (152):
- Tranche 1, December 2019 (30):
  - 5 VBM Freccia da Combattimento (AIFV)
  - 25 VBM Freccia Controcarro (ATGW)
- Tranche 2, December 2021, €400 million (46):
  - 26 VBM Freccia Posto Comando
    - 13 Nucleo Comando
    - 13 Nucleo Tattico
  - 14 VBM Freccia Porta Mortaio
  - 6 VBM Freccia Recupero e Soccorso (10×10)
- Tranche 3, December 2024 (76):
  - 60 VBM Freccia PLUS da Combattimento (AIFV)
  - 16 VBM Freccia PLUS Controcarro (ATGW)

=== Future contracts ===
Italian Army (229)

The following list includes the remaining number of each model that should be ordered for the Phase 2 of the VBM Freccia programme, but as the anti-tank variant was ordered in a larger quantity than initially planned (5 additional), same for the command variant (18 additional), this list below will be adjusted by the Italian government.
- 98 VBM Freccia PLUS da Combattimento (AIFV)
- 120 VBM Freccia PLUS Esploranti
- 34 VBM Freccia Recupero e Soccorso (10×10)

=== Failed bids ===
(Russia) Russian Ground Forces

In 2012, the Russian Army tested the Freccia fitted with a 30mm turret and the Centauro in 3 variants, equipped with the 105mm canon on the Centauro, one fitted with a Russian 125mm tank gun, and another one with a NATO 120mm tank gun with the HITFACT 120mm turret.
A discussion for up to 2,500 vehicles was mentioned. Following the Annexation of Crimea in 2014, sanctions were imposed on Russia, and all cooperation on armament was cancelled.

Slovenian Ground Force (up to 106)

The Slovenian Army is looking for up to 106 APC with a budget of €700 million after rejecting the contract for the Boxer. The finalists of the competition are the Piranha V, the Freccia, the Rosomak L and the Patria AMV^{XP}. On 11 July 2024 it was announced, that the Patria AMVxp won the competition.

Spanish Army

In 2015, a program to replace the VEC-M1, the BMR-M1 and part of the M113 fleet was launched by the Spanish Army. The competitors were the Boxer, the Freccia, the Patria AMV, the Piranha V, the SEP and the VBCI.
In September 2015, the competition was won by GDELS with the Piranha V. In December 2019, the Spanish Government cancelled the program, and relaunched the competition. In August 2020, the Piranha V of GDELS Santa Barbara Sistemas in collaboration with Indra Sistemas and Sapa Placencia won again the competition for a first batch of 348 vehicles for €1.74 billion. It is known as the Dragón VCR.

=== Tender ===
Chile (> 200)
The Chilean Army was looking for a successor to its 160 Piraña I 6×6 and 30 Piraña I 8×8. On a long term perspective, more than 200 vehicles are expected to be purchased, but in the meantime, a first phase of the replacement includes a tender for 82 8×8 armoured vehicles. The requirement mentions a maximum weight of 38 tons. The deadline for the selection is dated April 8, 2025. Among the known competitors were.:
- Altuğ by the Turkish BMC
- Patria AMV by the Finnish Patria Group
- Arma by the Turkish Otokar
- Freccia by the Italian Iveco
- K808 White Tiger by the South Korean Hyundai Rotem
- Pandur II 8×8 by the Czech Excalibur Army
- Stryker 8×8 by the United States US army (the only offer for already used units)
- Terrex ICV by the Singapore ST Engineering

== See also ==
=== Comparable vehicles ===
- BTR 4 – (Ukraine)
- Boxer – (Germany, Netherlands)
- CM-32 – (Taiwan)
- FNSS PARS III – (Turkey)
- Iveco SuperAV – (Italy)
- K808 White Tiger – (South Korea)
- LAV 6 – (Canada)
- LAV 700 – (Canada)
- Mowag Piranha IIIH – (Switzerland)
- Mowag Piranha IV – (Switzerland)
- Mowag Piranha V – (Switzerland)
- Otokar Arma – (Turkey)
- Pandur II – (Austria)
- Patria AMV – (Finland)
- Stryker – (United States, Canada)
- TATA Kestrel – (India)
- Terrex ICV – (Singapore)
- VBCI – (France)
- VPK-7829 Bumerang – (Russia)
