= ZSSW-30 =

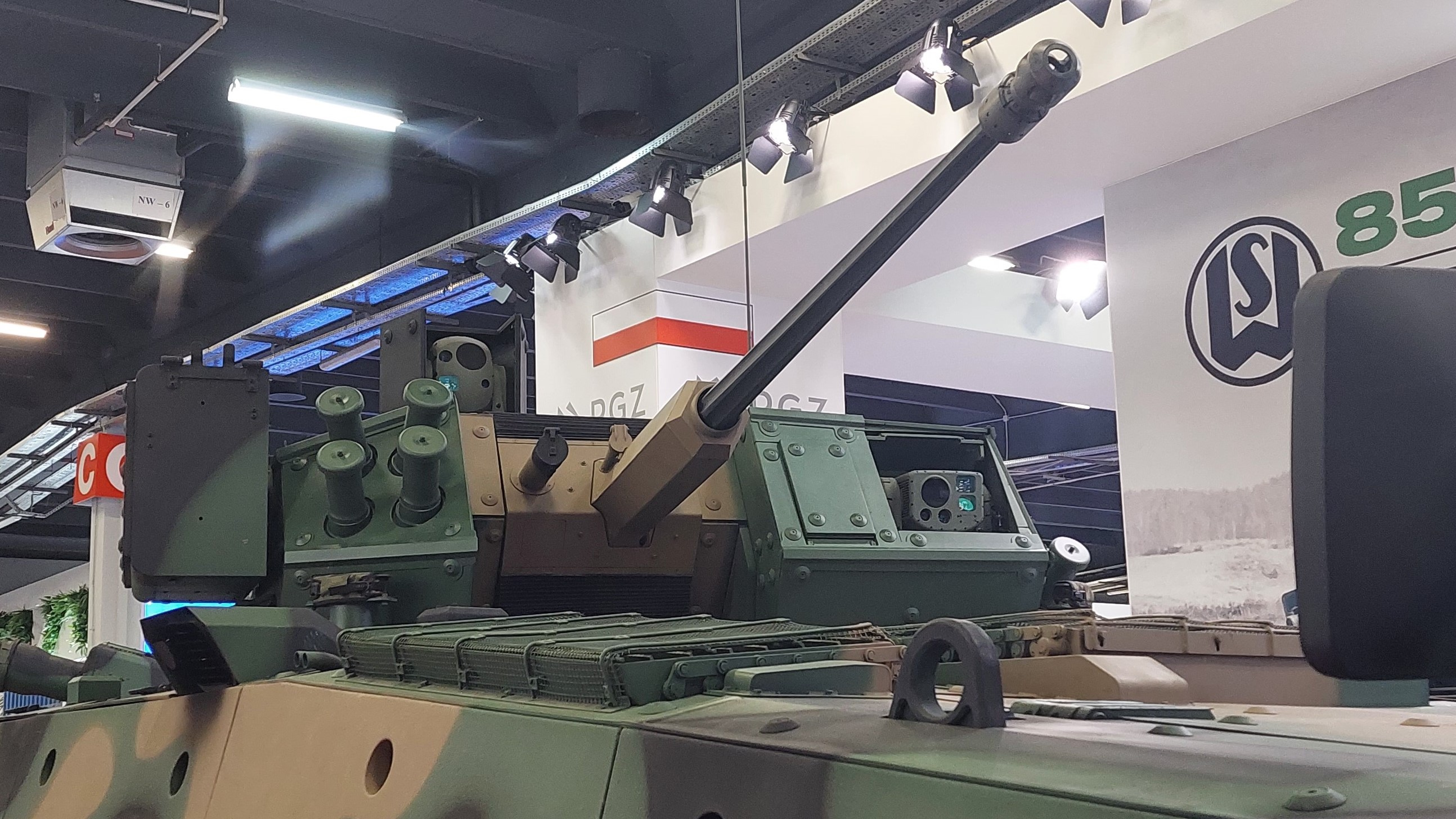
- ZSSW-30 turret mounted on the Borsuk IFV during the MSPO 23 defense exhibition.
- Type: Remote controlled weapon station
- Place of origin: Poland

Service history
- Used by: Polish Land Forces

Production history
- Designer: Consortium of HSW and WB Group
- Manufacturer: HSW
- Produced: 2022-present
- No. built: ?/70 (first order)

Specifications
- Crew: Unmanned
- Main armament: 30mm Mk44S Bushmaster II autocannon; 2× Spike-LR anti-tank guided missile
- Secondary armament: 7.62mm UKM-2000C coaxial machine gun; 8× 81mm GAk-81 smoke grenades

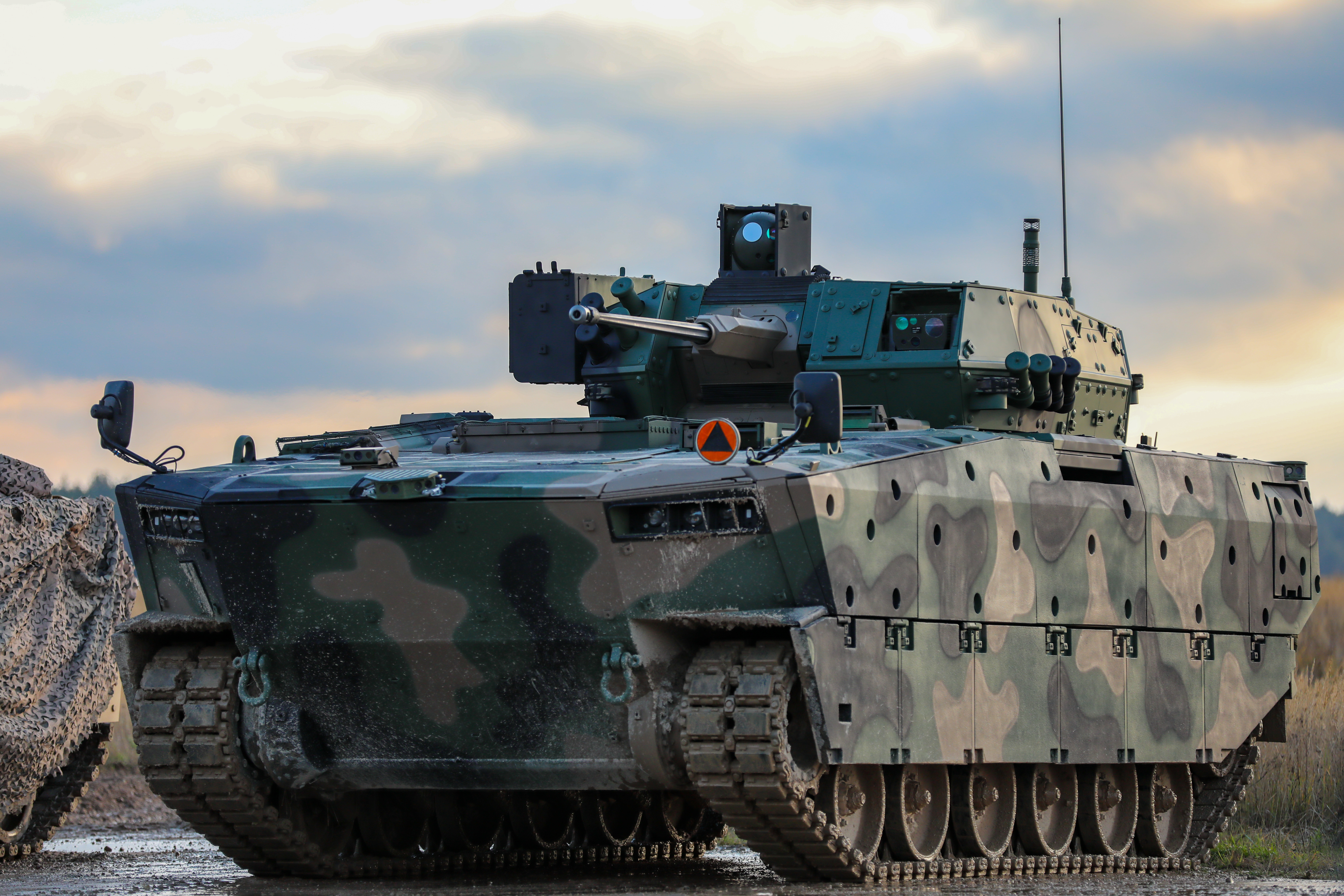
ZSSW-30 mounted on BWP Borsuk infantry fighting vehicle

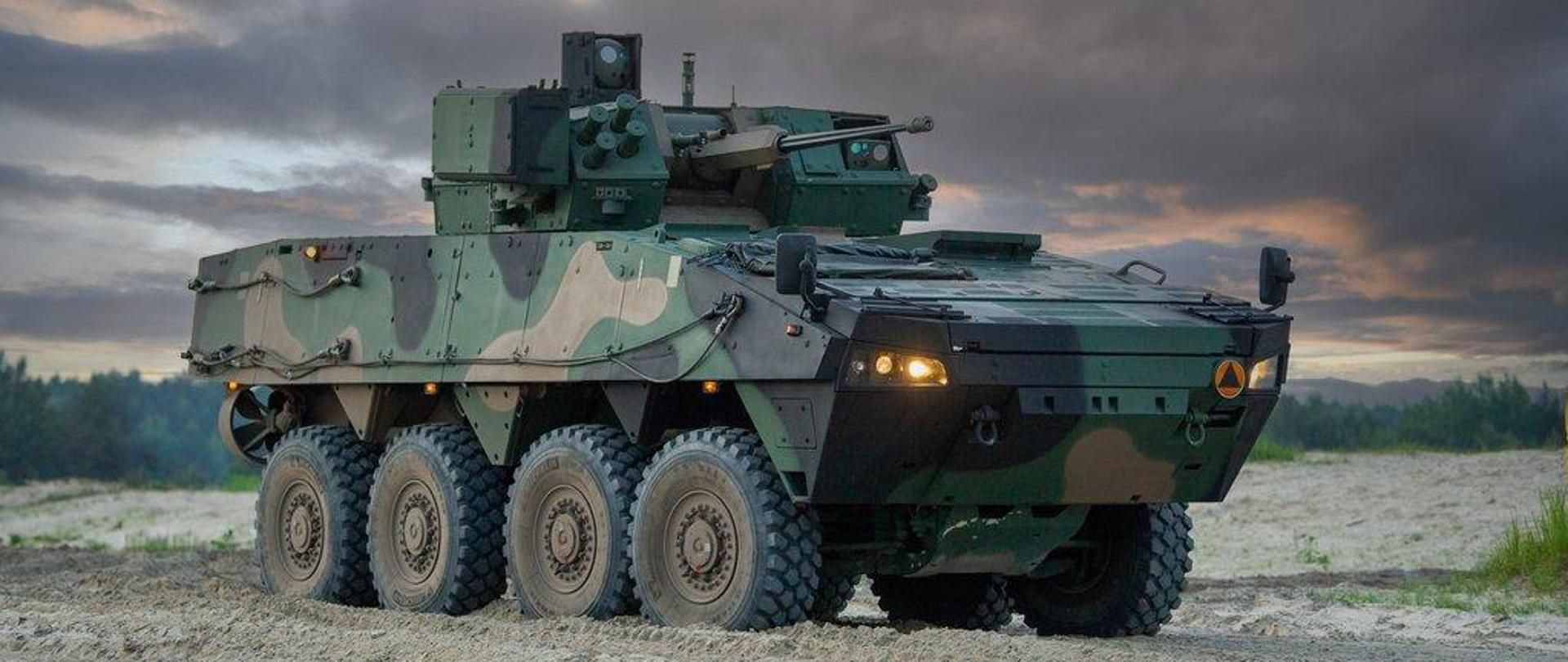
ZSSW-30 mounted on an infantry fighting vehicle variant of KTO Rosomak

The ZSSW-30 (Polish: Zdalnie Sterowany System Wieżowy 30 mm - 30mm Remote Control Turret System) is a Polish remotely controlled turret designed by Huta Stalowa Wola and WB Electronics as a replacement for the Hitfist-30P turret of the Rosomak APC. It is also used on the Borsuk IFV.

== Development ==
=== History ===
The ZSSW-30 turret was developed in response to the issues regarding the maintenance and modernization attempts of the Hitfist-30P turrets for the Rosomak APC. Initially the most popular direction was to buy a license for the Hitfist OWS unmanned turret with the rights to produce the majority of components domestically, however it was ultimately rejected as it was feared that the new turret would encounter identical issues, since they were caused mainly by poor cooperation between the Polish industry and Leonardo.

The design requirements were ready in March 2011, and two consortia entered the competition. First one consisting of ZM Bumar Łabędy, OBRUM, OBRSM (currently ZM Tarnów), Wojskowe Zakłady Motoryzacyjne (WZM), Przemysłowe Centrum Optyki (PCO), ZM Tarnów and WAT, and the second one of HSW and WB Electronics. Both contenders offered similar designs - closed turret structure protecting all the mechanisms and electronics with a separate container for ATGMs. The biggest difference between them was that the first design used the remote control weapon station (from the ZSMU-1276 family) as the commander's sight.

Ultimately, the second design was chosen despite the fact that the companies making up the first consortium had way more experience in designing turret systems (for example the turret of the PZA Loara). On March 29, 2013, an agreement was signed between the Ministry of National Defence and the consortium consisting of Huta Stalowa Wola S.A. and WB Electronics, under which a prototype batch of five turrets was to be developed until 2015 and the serial production of the turrets for the Rosomak was to begin in 2016. The program was delayed several times due to the timeframe being unrealistically short and because the MoD, still remembering problems with the Hitfist-30P, decided to eliminate most of the foreign components from the design.

The first mock-up of the ZSSW-30 turret was presented at the MSPO 2014 military expo, with the first prototype being presented a year later when the initial developmental work was finished. Unlike the mock-up, the 2015 prototype already looked very similar to the final design with the main visual difference being the barrel shroud not present on the later prototypes and production variant.

Factory testing of the first turret prototype took place in 2015 and 2016, with the first ATGM test launches on July 14, 2016. The development has been completed in 2019 and the trials began on January 22, 2020. On October 1, 2021, the turret system had officially completed the trials with a positive result, which opened the way to negotiations between the MoD and the manufacturer and to serial production. On July 5, 2022, the Armaments Agency (the procurement agency of the MoD) and the HSW-WB consortium signed a framework agreement for the delivery of 341 turrets for the Rosomak wheeled IFVs as well as an executive contract for the first 70 turrets. The first turrets are expected to be delivered in 2023. On November 21, 2022, WB Group contracted PCO with the production of 70 GOD-1 "Iris" and 70 GOC-1 "Nike" sights for the first batch of ZSSW-30 turrets.

The ZSSW-30 officially entered service in December 2023, when first five Rosomak IFVs equipped with these turrets entered service with the 21st Podhale Rifle Brigade.

=== Future ===
On the Defence24 Day conference which took place in May 2023, Remigiusz Wilk, communications director of the WB Group talked about the development and future of the ZSSW-30 turret. One of the main development directions is the implementation of the EyeQ AI into the turret's FCS. These algorithms will give ZSSW-30 a number of advantages over contemporary turret designs, such as the ability to passively (without triggering the target's LWR) measure the distance to multiple targets and mark them on the tactical map, improved target tracking regardless of the weather conditions, the ability to fuze visual data from different sources such as UAVs or other vehicles which will enable the crew to "see" the targets beyond their line of sight and increase their identification range.

== Description ==
=== Armament ===
The ZSSW-30 is armed with the Mk44S Bushmaster II chain gun, coaxial 7.62 mm UKM-2000C machine gun. and a launch container on its right side for two Spike-LR anti-tank guided missiles. It also features eight 81 mm grenade launchers using the GAk-81 phosphorus smoke grenades.

==== Main gun ====
The main armament of the ZSSW-30 is the Mk44S Bushmaster II 30×173mm chain gun. Mk44S (Stretch) is a variant of the standard Mk44 gun that can be adapted to fire the 40×180mm SuperShot40 ammunition by swapping just a few components (including the barrel). The gun fires at a rate of 200 RPM for standard ammunition, and 120 RPM for ABM and has elevation angles extending from -9° to +60°. The gun has a dual feed system and is fed from the left side by two ammunition racks located on the left side of the turret - the smaller one, containing 80 rounds, usually loaded with armor piercing ammunition, and the bigger one containing around 120 rounds, usually loaded with multi purpose ammunition. The spent casings are ejected to the front, through the chute in the gun mantlet. The ammunition used in ZSSW-30 is produced by Mesko, with the FAPDS-T being a domestic development and other ammo types being produced under a license from Nammo (the license and technology transfer was a part of the offset for the Rosomak APC purchase).

Designation	Type	Projectile weight (g)	Cartridge weight (g)	Bursting charge (g)	Muzzle velocity (m/s)	Penetration (mm RHA at 60° at 1 km)
NM225	APFSDS-T	227,5	710	-	1,430	100-110
N/A	FAPDS-T	235	715	-	1,385	N/A
NM222	MP-T/SD	363	835	40	1070	10
NM219	TP-T	363	835	-	1070	-

==== Coaxial machine gun ====
Alongside the Bushmaster II chain gun, the ZSSW-30 is fitted with the UKM-2000C general-purpose machine gun. The machine gun is mounted coaxially to the main gun on its right side, with its barrel being covered by a shroud similar to that covering the coaxial machine gun of an Abrams tank. UKM-2000C is a version of the UKM-2000 (itself being a PKM designed to use 7.62×51mm NATO round linked by the M13 link), adapted to use in the vehicles by removing the stock and installing a solenoid trigger, gas regulator and heavier, longer barrel. It fires at a rate of 700-850 rounds per minute, and is fed by a 400-round belt. The spent casings and links are ejected through an opening in the right side of the turret below the ATGM container.

==== ATGM ====
For engaging heavily armored targets, ZSSW-30 is equipped with a dual ATGM launch container mounted to the right side of the turret. The use of a separate container has some advantages compared to other systems where a launcher extends directly from an internal compartment of the turret. Among those are separation of the missiles from the rest of the turret (and thus greater safety of the crew and the turret itself), ability to quickly replace damaged or destroyed container while in the field as well as easy integration of missiles of different weight and size, while the main disadvantage of such design choice is a difficult integration of a hard kill active protection system. The ATGMs can be reloaded from a hatch in the rear of the vehicle without the necessity for the crew to leave the vehicle (in the same manner as in the Bradley IFV).

As for now, ZSSW-30 has been integrated with three different missiles:

- Spike-LR
- Spike-LR2
- FGM-148 Javelin

Spike is a family of Israeli fifth generation anti-tank guided missiles that features both fire-and-forget mode and command guidance via a fiber optic data link. They also integrate third party target designation for indirect fire through its lock-on after launch capability for non-line-of-sight (NLOS) use. Spike-LR and LR2 can engage targets in a direct attack or top attack mode, which makes them capable of destroying modern MBTs. Spike-LR can hit targets at ranges from 200 meters to 4 kilometers when guided manually, and up to 4.5 kilometers in the fire-and-forget mode, while the Spike-LR2 has a maximum range of 5.5 kilometers. Both variants feature a tandem warhead with the penetration of over 700 mm RHA after ERA for the LR variant and 30% more for the LR2.

The Javelin is an American fire-and-forget, IIR guided anti-tank guided missile. The system employs a top attack flight profile against well armored vehicles such as MBTs, but can also be used in a direct attack mode against softer targets such as IFVs, unarmored vehicles or buildings, as well as targets too close for top attack and even helicopters. In the top attack mode, the Javelin can reach a peak altitude of 150 m in top attack mode. Initial versions had a range of 2 kilometers, later increased to 2.5 kilometers. Javelin's tandem HEAT warhead is stated as being able to penetrate in excess of 760 mm RHA after ERA.

==== Smoke grenades ====
For protection, the turret is equipped with eight 81 mm smoke grenade launchers, four on the left side and four on the front to the right of the main gun. The grenades used are the GAk-81 multispectral phosphorus grenades designed and produced by ZSP Niewiadów (Zakłady Sprzętu Precyzyjnego Niewiadów). When fired, grenades fly 30–60 meters (depending on the launcher's angle) and after up to 4.5 seconds from being fired, starts to produce the smokescreen. The smokescreen lasts for 30–50 seconds depending on the weather conditions and covers the vehicle in the visible light spectrum as well as in the IR spectrum of 1-5 μm.

ZSP Niewiadów designed a more modern GM-81 smoke grenade which works in a broader wavelength spectrum (0.3 - 14 μm) and has an additional charge which generates a short lasting (around 5 seconds) cloud of smoke immediately upon firing and covers the vehicle before the main charge starts generating smoke (which lasts longer as well - 40–60 seconds), however the Land Forces hasn't adopted it and still uses the old GAk-81 grenades.

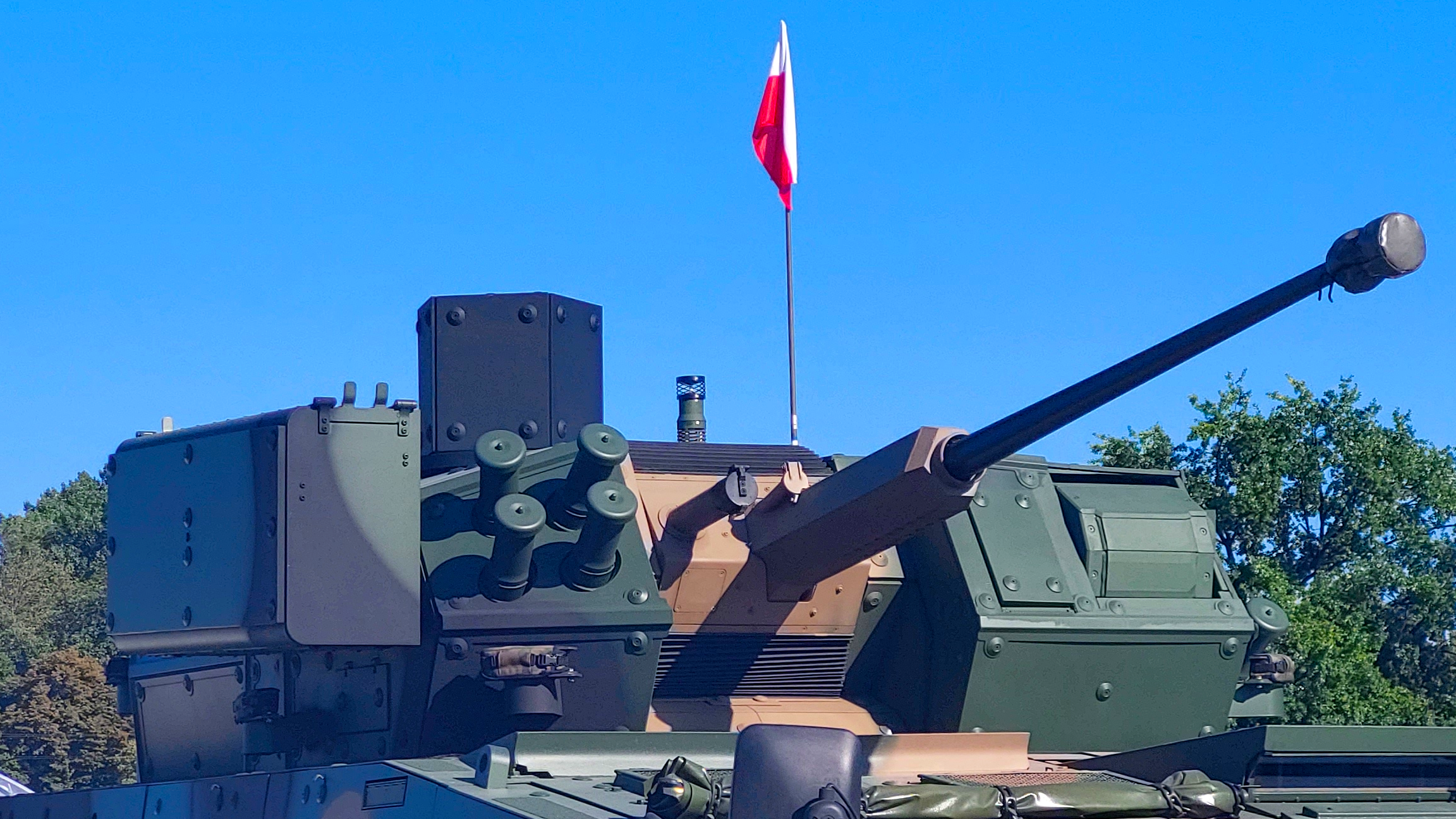
ZSSW-30 with its sights covered, Armed Forces Day 2023

=== Protection ===
==== Armor ====
The level of armor protection of the ZSSW-30 turret is not disclosed by the manufacturer, but according to unofficial sources, the armor consists of a thin layer of polyethylene fabric sandwiched between two steel plates and an additional piece of ceramic composite armor (two steel plates with alumina tiles in between) on the ATGM container. This provides level III protection for both the main structure and the missile container, while the external parts such as the sights are protected at level II.

==== Active protection ====
In addition to armor, ZSSW-30 is protected by the Obra-3 soft kill APS. This system consists of four laser warning receivers (each one consisting of three detectors), a control unit and eight smoke grenade dischargers. The detectors work in 360° azimuth and in an elevation ranging from -6° to +30° and can detect light in the wavelength spectrum ranging from 0.6 to 11 μm as well as distinguish between different laser sources, such as laser rangefinders or target designators. Obra-3 can work in different modes: manual, semi-automatic and automatic. In the automatic mode the grenades are launched automatically into the specific path an incoming laser beam (immediately after the turret is rotated in this direction, which is also done automatically). The system uses GAk-81 phosphorus multispectral smoke grenades.

=== Situational awareness ===
ZSSW-30 is equipped with the GOD-1 "Iris" sight for the commander and GOC-1 "Nike" sight for the gunner, both of which are integrated into the turret's fire control system and consist of a laser rangefinder as well as daytime and thermal optical channels. The turret is also fitted with an auxiliary optical sight which is not integrated with the FCS and is meant to be used in emergency situations from inside of the turret. It is located to the right of the gunners primary sight behind an armored cover.

==== Commander's sight ====
The commander's sight provides 360° field of view with elevation angles from -20° to 60°. It is equipped with an eye-safe laser rangefinder and two optical channels: daytime, with a light intensity sensor and thermal. The sight can rotate with the angular velocity of 1 rad/s (57 °/s). The sight is mounted on top of the turret in an armored cover that provides level II of ballistic protection and can turn independently from the sight. This allows it to cover the sight by rotating 180°.

The daytime camera has two fields of view: wide (10.7° × 8°) and narrow (3.3° × 2.5°) which provide 5,500 m detection, 1,800 m recognition and 900 m identification ranges for the wide FoV and 12,500 m detection, 4,800 m recognition and 2,500 m identification ranges for the narrow one.

The night vision camera has a French 3rd generation (640 × 512 px) image sensor which works in the wavelength spectrum of 8 to 12 μm. It provides a wide FoV of 10° × 8° with 5,500 m detection, 1,800 m recognition and 900 m identification ranges and a narrow one of 3.1° × 2.5° with 13,500 m detection, 5,700 m recognition and 2,800 m identification ranges. The rangefinder uses the 1.54 μm laser and can measure the range from 100 to 10,000 meters, with a margin of error of 5 meters.

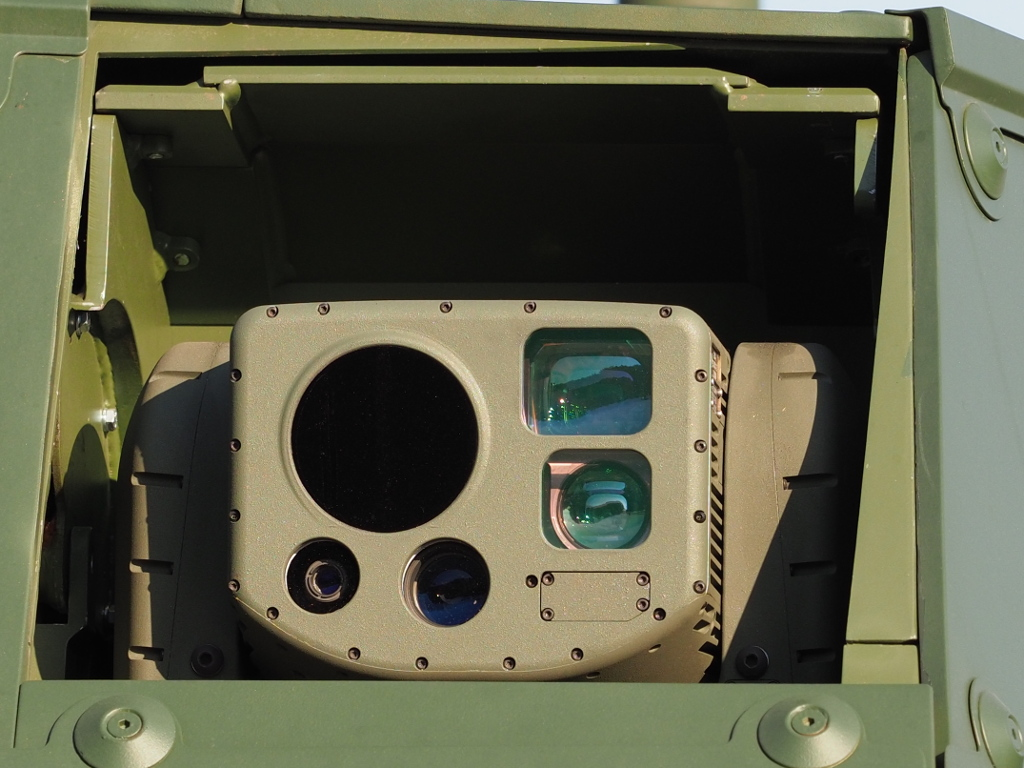
GOC-1 Nike gunner sight

==== Gunner's sight ====
The gunner's sight provides elevation angles from -10° to 60° and is equipped with an eye-safe laser rangefinder and two optical channels: daytime, with a light intensity sensor and thermal. The sight is mounted on the left side of the turret and can be covered by an armored door.

The daytime camera and laser rangefinder are identical to those used in the commanders sight.

The night vision camera has a French 3rd generation (640 × 512 px) image sensor which works in the wavelength spectrum of 3 to 5 μm. It provides a wide FoV of 10° × 8° with 4,950 m detection, 1,600 m recognition and 800 m identification ranges and a narrow one of 3.1° × 2.5° with 11,500 m detection, 4,800 m recognition and 2,400 m identification ranges.

==== Fire control system ====
The ZSSW-30 fire control system is made by WB Group and provides full hunter-killer and killer-killer capabilities as well as superb accuracy when firing at moving targets from both moving and standing position. According to unofficial sources ZSSW-30 can engage moving targets at 2 kilometers range with greater accuracy than the Leopard 2A5. The fire control system also allows for shooting in every position of the turret relative to the hull in all three axes (which is not a common feature for other comparable systems). Both the gunner and the commander have an auto-tracker integrated into their FCS, which substantially increases automation of the entire firing process. The ZSSW-30 FCS is net-centric. It can transfer and coordinate information between different turrets. It is also able to coordinate and communicate with various types of UAVs. Both of those features greatly increase situational awareness and combat effectiveness of each and every vehicle.

== See also ==
Vehicles equipped with the ZSSW-30 turret:

- Rosomak
- Borsuk

Similar turret systems:

- Bumerang-BM
- Hitfist OWS
- TRT-25
- Shturm
