= VBCI =

French wheeled infantry fighting vehicle

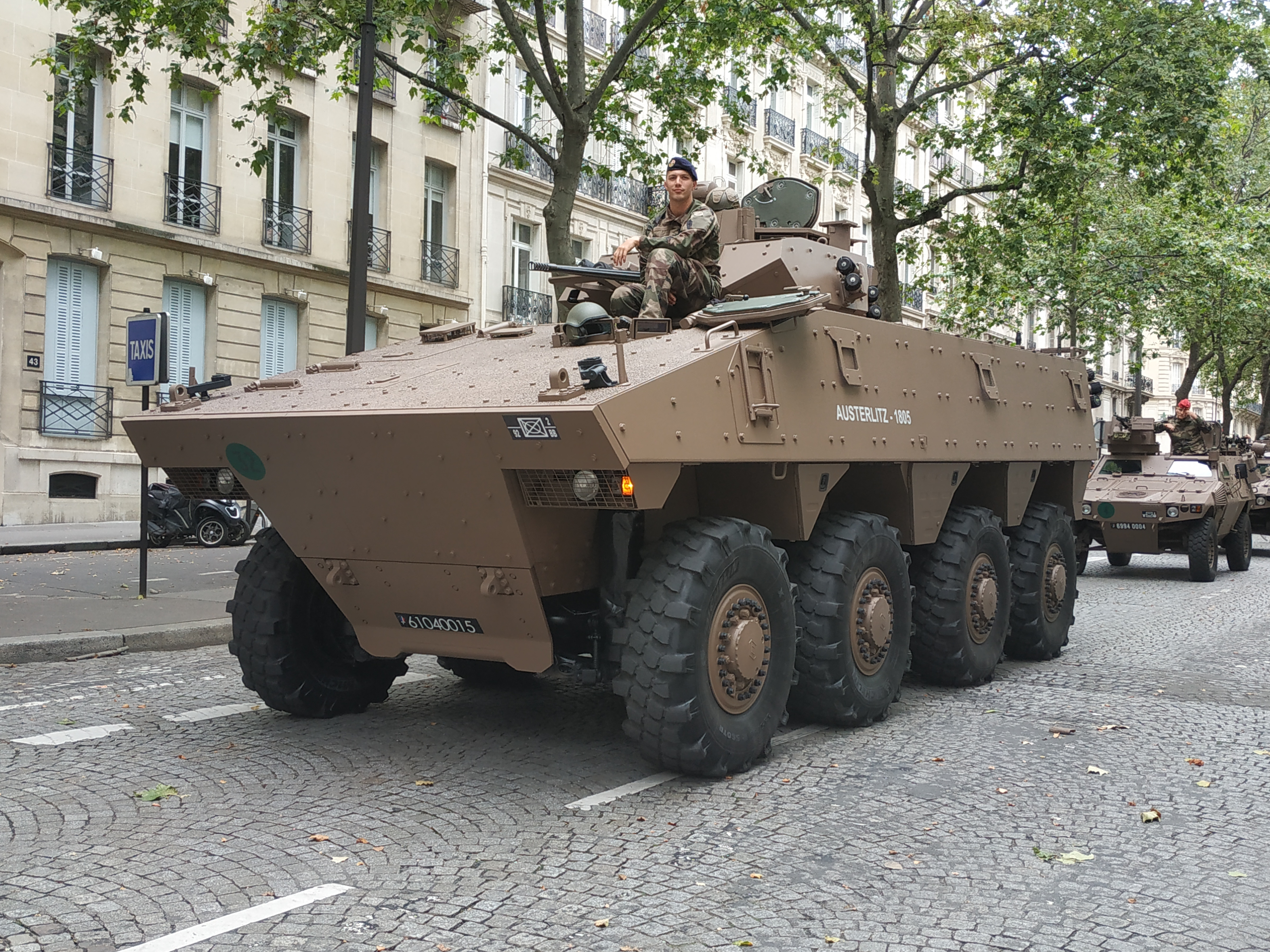
- French Army VBCI in 2021
- Type: Infantry fighting vehicle
- Place of origin: France

Service history
- In service: 2008–present
- Used by: France
- Wars: War in Afghanistan; Operation Serval

Production history
- Designer: GIAT Industries; Renault Trucks Defense
- Designed: 2000–2007
- Manufacturer: GIAT Industries; Renault Trucks Defense
- Unit cost: VCI: €3.49m (FY2012); VPC: €2.74m (FY2012)
- Produced: 2008–2018
- No. built: 630 (510 VCI and 120 VPC)

Specifications
- Mass: VCI: 28.5 t–32 t (normal combat load); VPC: 28.5 t–32 t (normal combat load)
- Length: 7.6 m
- Width: 2.98 m
- Height: 3 m
- Crew: 2 + 9-man combat group
- Armour: Protection against 14.5 mm API
- Main armament: GIAT M811 25 mm autocannon (400 rounds/ minute)
- Secondary armament: co-axial 7.62 mm machine gun
- Engine: Renault Diesel; 550 hp (410 kW)
- Suspension: Wheel
- Operational range: 750 km (470 mi)
- Maximum speed: 100 km/h (62 mph)

The véhicule blindé de combat d'infanterie (English: armoured infantry fighting vehicle) or VBCI is a French wheeled Infantry fighting vehicle designed and manufactured by GIAT Industries (now KNDS France) and Renault Trucks Defense (now Arquus) to replace the AMX-10P. The first units entered active service with the French Army in 2008. A total of 630 units were ordered, and full delivery was completed in 2018. They are available in two core variants, the VCI infantry fighting vehicle and the VPC command post vehicle.

The VBCI is built on an aluminium hull which carries a modular THD steel and titanium armour that can be replaced in the field. The 8×8 wheeled design was chosen to make the VBCI more comfortable as well as easier and less costly to maintain on war theaters than a tracked vehicle would be, while giving it sufficient mobility to complement the Leclerc tank. The VBCI is also designed to be transportable by the Airbus A400M.

== History ==
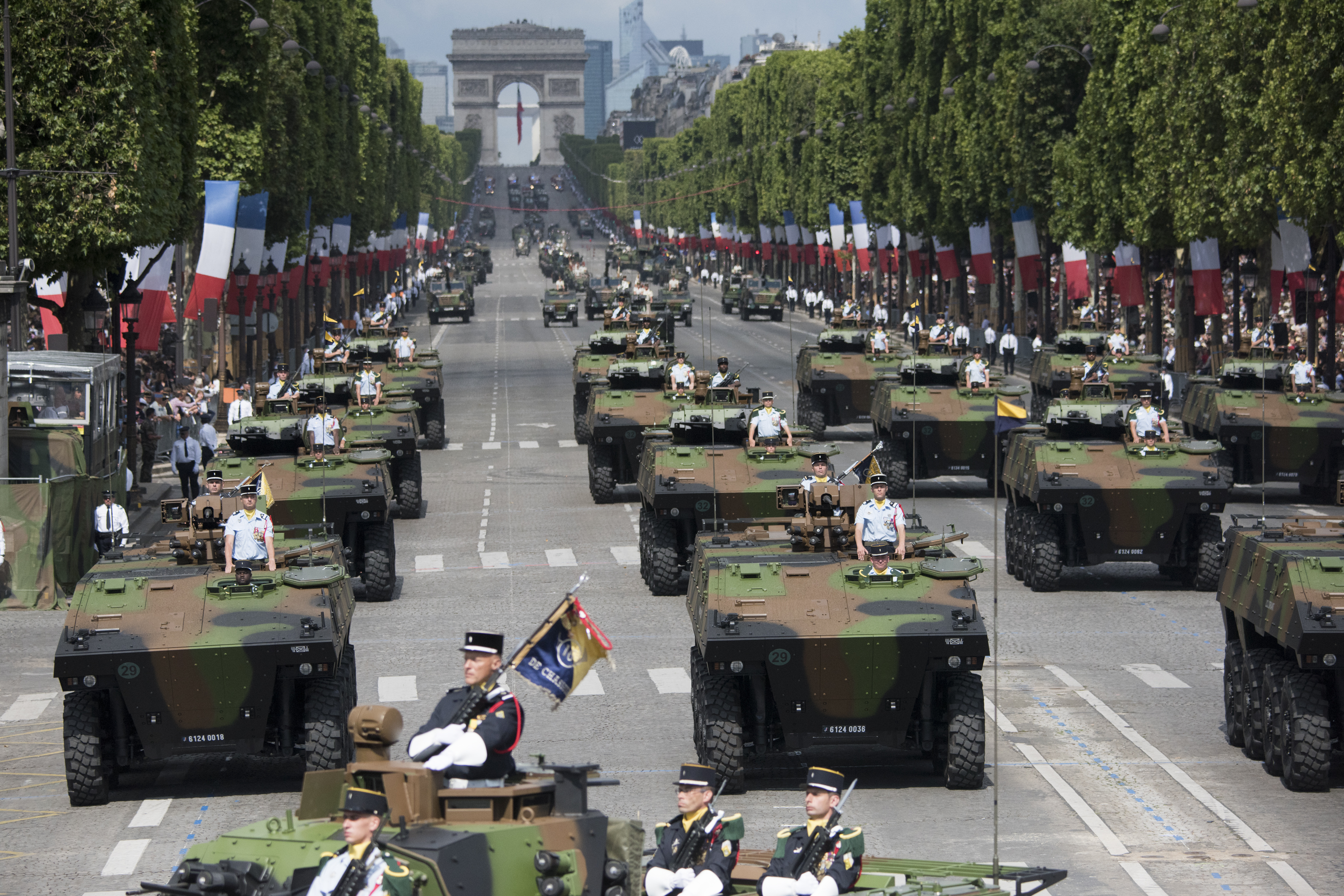
Bastille Day Parade 2017, VBCI of the 16th battalion of chasseurs.

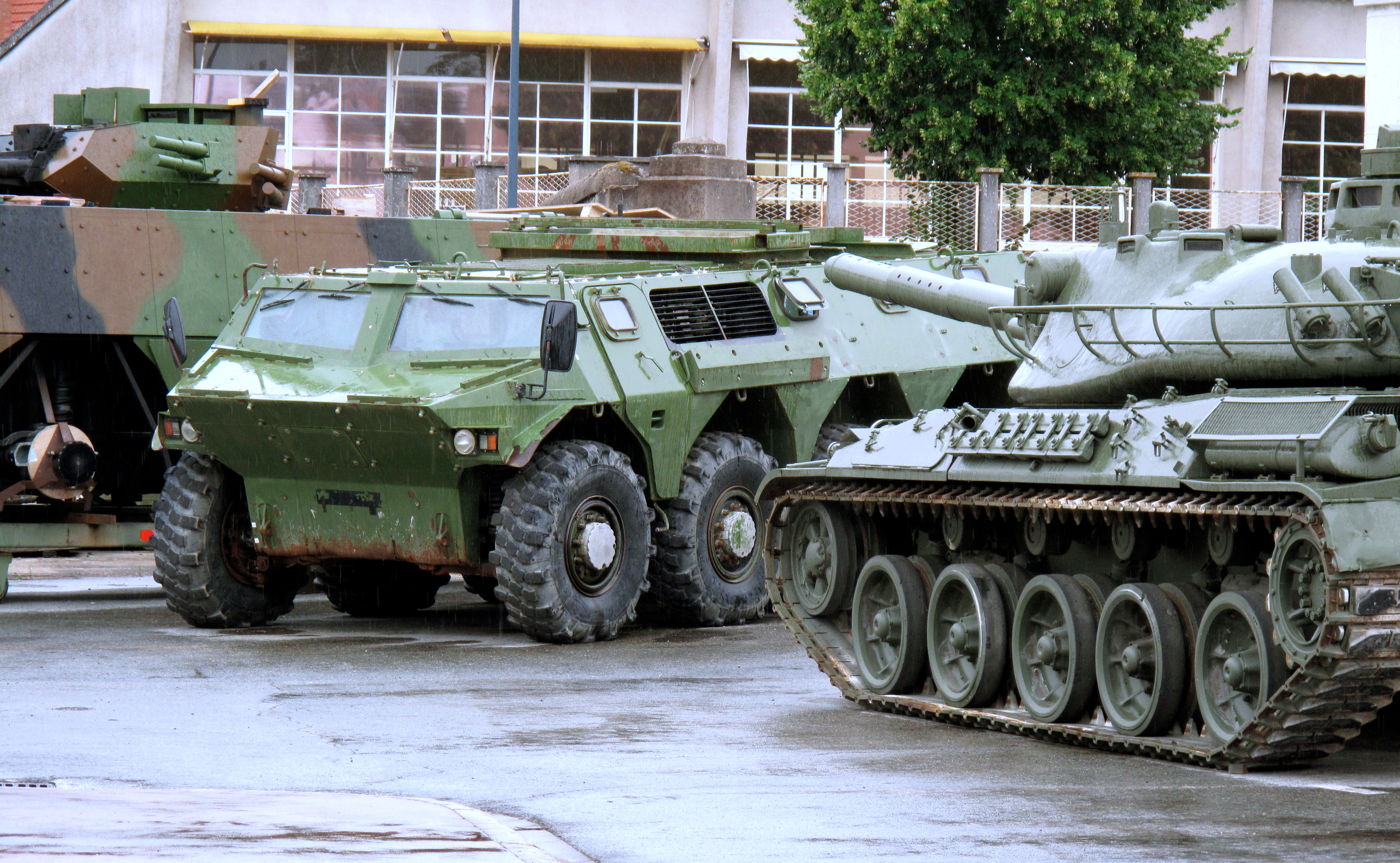
The Renault X8A demonstrator, used to experiment towards the VCBI. An actual VCBI is in the background. On display at the Musée des Blindés in Saumur.

In the early 1990s, the French government started the VBM (Véhicule Blindé Modulaire — Modular Armoured Vehicle) as a replacement for its older IFVs. Soon, Germany and the United Kingdom joined the project. At Eurosatory 1996, Renault unveiled the X8A, an eight-wheeled prototype in this perspective.

However, in 1999, the programme came to a dead-end, and France decided to carry on on its own and ordered 700 vehicles on 6 November 2000. In 2003–2004, the programme reached some major milestones: The mobility/agility tests, the armour tests and the electronic systems tests were all successful. From 2004 to 2005, the first five prototypes (four VCIs and one VPC) were tested in real conditions. These tests proved some crucial design mistakes on the DRAGAR turret, which had to be redesigned. The two years delay in the programme are consequences of this design flaw.

As the programme reaches completion, other variants are being studied. A mortar version and a vehicle using the MILAN Missile have been considered by the developer. Note that none of these variants are being developed as of now, but feasibility studies are being conducted. In June 2007, VBCI was being considered for the British FRES programme.

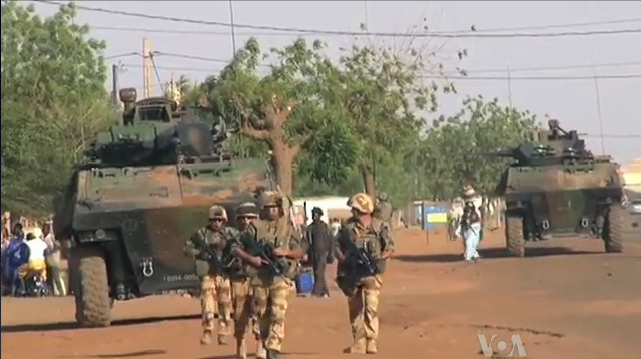
French soldiers and VBCIs near Gao, Mali, in March or April 2013.

France originally planned to buy 550 VCI and 150 of the VPC command version, but this was cut to 510 and 120 respectively with deliveries until 2015. The €3.49bn (FY2012) project will deliver 630 units at a unit cost of €3.49m (~US$4.8m) for the VCI and €2.74m (~US$3.7m) for the VPC, or €5.5m (~US$7.4m) per vehicle including development costs.

The 200th VBCI was delivered to the French army on 23 June 2010. The 400th VBCI was delivered to the French army on 12 June 2012. The first unit to be equipped with the new infantry fighting vehicle was the 35th Infantry Regiment in Belfort. The 500th VBCI was delivered to the French Army on 8 July 2013. Delivery of 110 command post vehicles has been completed.

At Eurosatory 2014, KNDS unveiled improvements to the VBCI IFV variant following trials. The rear wheels have steering to reduce its turning radius to 20 meters, and rear internal volume was increased by moving electrical equipment to the front of the vehicle. To make room for the equipment, the driver's seat was pulled back and two sloping angles were added to the front end for the driver to maintain visibility. In September 2014, the French Army Procurement Agency (DGA) declared the qualification of a new version of the VBCI with a 32-ton gross vehicle weight, compared to 29 tons previously. The increase in gross weight allows the vehicle to have better protection and preserves its capability to be upgraded. The 32-ton configuration will be delivered to the French armed forces starting in 2015.

=== United Kingdom ===
In July 2014, France agreed to loan 19 VBCIs to the British Army for testing. It had been reported a few months prior that the British Army was interested in the vehicle for its Mechanised Infantry Vehicle program. In February 2014, it had also been indicated that the French Army may purchase the British Watchkeeper WK450 unmanned aerial vehicle if the British Army opted for the VBCI. Ultimately, no deal was reached between the two countries. In November 2019, the British Army announced its selection of the Boxer for its MIV program.

=== Qatar ===
In December 2017, during a visit by French President Emmanuel Macron, Qatar announced it intended to purchase 490 Nexter VBCI vehicles. Negotiations continue to be under way for the exact loadout of the 490 vehicles, with American, British, French, Norwegian and Belgian firms bidding for turret systems among other systems.

In March 2018, it was reported Kongsberg would supply unmanned medium-calibre turrets and Protector remote weapons stations in the event that Qatar ordered the VBCIs in a contract worth up to US$1.94 billion.

== Specifications ==
=== C4ISR ===
The VBCI will be completely integrated in the French C4ISR capability. The VCI version will use the SIT (Système d'Information Terminal — The lowest level of C4IST in the French forces), while the VPC will use the SIR (Système d'Information Régimentaire — A higher level in the same system).

The vehicle will be designed to primarily carry soldiers equipped with the FÉLIN system.

=== DRAGAR turret ===
The DRAGAR turret (GIAT Industries) is a single seat modular design turret integrating a 25 mm stabilized gun. Fire control integrates a laser rangefinder and a thermal camera. The rate of fire is up to 400 rounds/min, and the turret allows anti-air self-defence. It also includes a coaxial 7.62 mm machine gun for close defence and a Galix grenade launching system. The turret adds 2,000 kilograms (4,400 lb) to a vehicle's weight.

== Variants ==
=== French variants ===
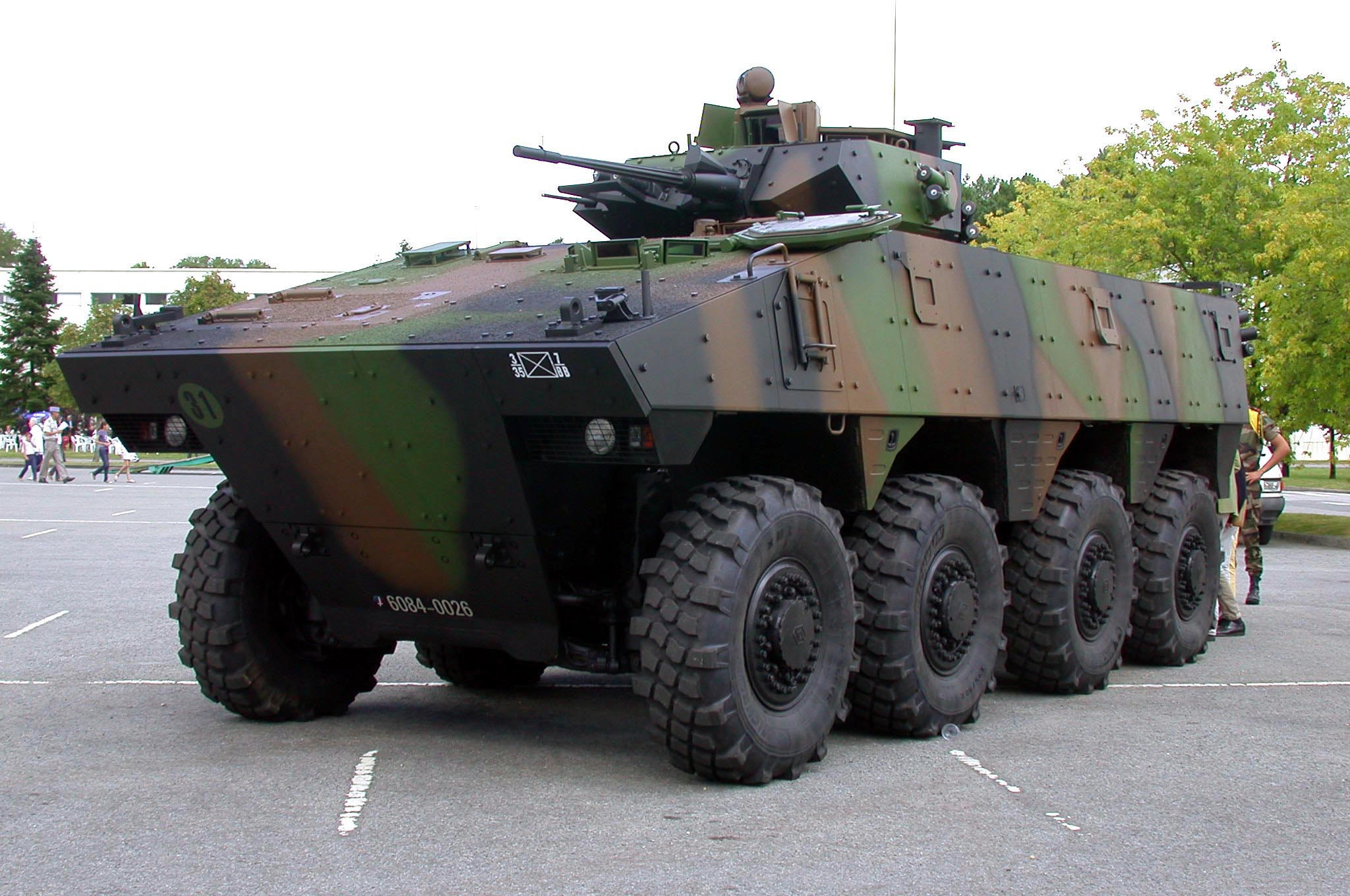
A VBCI on display

- VCI (infantry fighting vehicle): Combat group of nine men (+ crew of two), medium calibre Dragar type turret (25 mm), 7.62 mm machine gun.
- VPC (command post vehicle): Two SIP stations with seven men (+ crew), self-defence turret armed with a 12.7 mm machine gun.
- VBCI 32T: The 32T variant has been developed to increase protection against improvised explosive devices as well as to facilitate the preservation of the vehicle's scalability and its adaptation to future needs. It possesses a centralized tire inflation system and a reinforced undercarriage, leading to the increase of the gross vehicle weight from 29 tons to 32 tons. Many VCI and VPC were thus delivered in this variant.

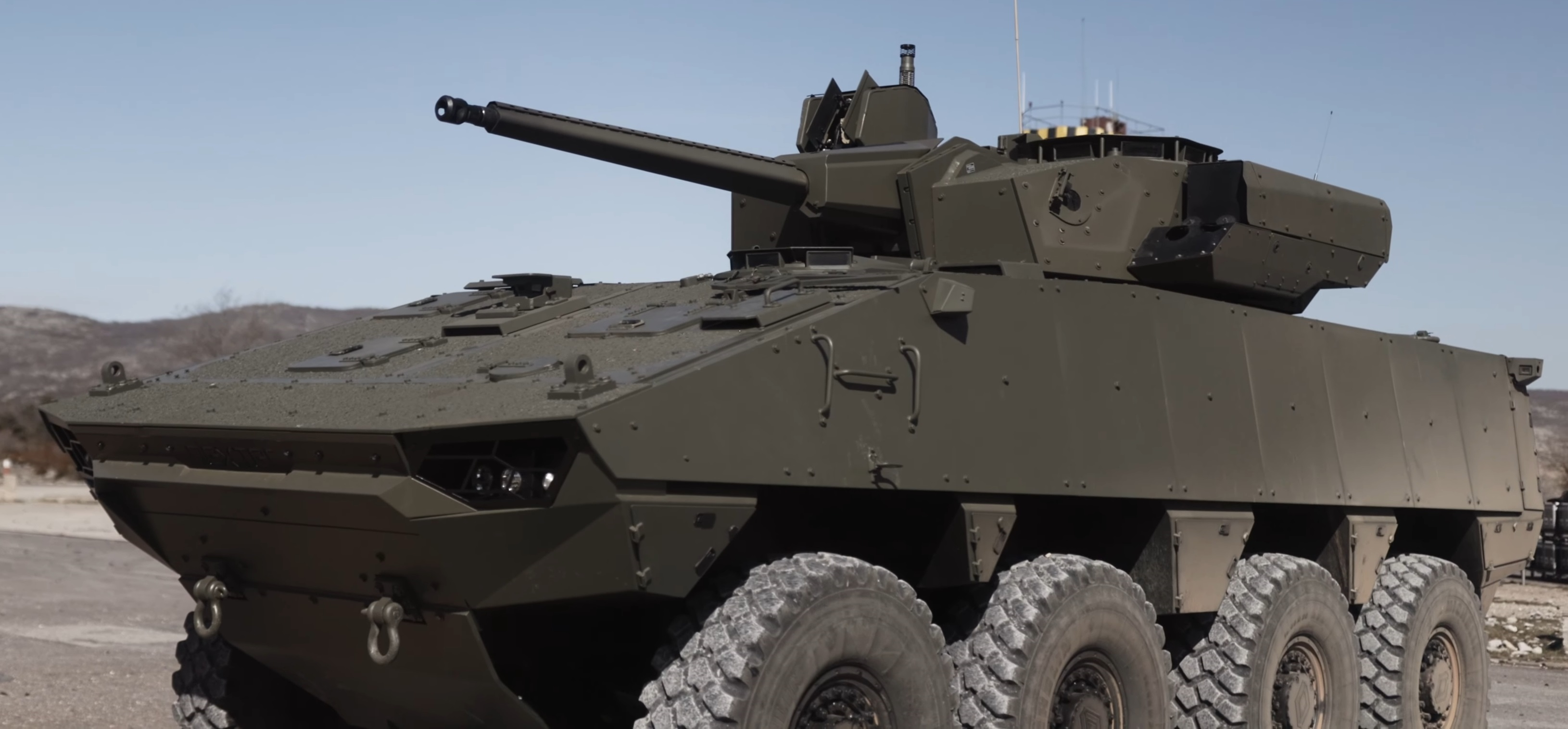
VBCI-2

=== Export variants ===
- VTT (troop transport vehicle): It is designed to transport troops. It has an interior volume of 13 m^{3} and can carry a two-man crew and up to ten soldiers with their equipment. The VTT is sized to meet export requirements and is currently being considered by several national armies.

Common features for all variants include SIT (Système d'Information Terminal) communication equipment, combat identification equipment, and NBC detection and protection equipment.

- VBCI-2

The VBCI 2 is an improved version, intended for export, with a new engine (600 hp Volvo D13 turbocharged diesel engine), new air conditioner, and new optronic sensors. It is heavier (32 t) and the prototype is equipped with a two-man turret integrating the CTA 40CT 40mm autocannon.

== Operators ==
=== Current operators ===
France (640)
640 VBCI Mk I delivered to the French Army between 2008 and 2018 (520 VCI and 120 VPC).

=== Potential operators ===
Greece (up to 370)
KNDS and Hellenic Defence Systems partnered in 2022 to offer the VBCI Philoctetes to the Hellenic Army. In 2024, more details regarding the potential sale of VBCI were revealed:
- 200 VBCI-2 that would be equipped with the T40 turret (40CTC and the Akeron MP ATGM)
- 50 VBCI-2 in support configurations (sanitary, artillery observation, command)
- 120 VBCI, second-hand from the French Army for rapid implementation

The program was confirmed in April 2025.

Ireland
The Irish Army is looking to replace its 80 Piranha III and its 27 RG-32. Among the potential successors are:
- Mowag Eagle V
- Mowag Piranha V
- VBMR-L Serval
- VBCI
- Boxer
Ireland mentions a need of 100 vehicles, a budget of €400 million. The split is unclear at the moment.

Qatar (120)
In December 2017, a letter of intent between the Qatar and French governments was signed for 490 VBCI. In 2019, the end of negotiations was announced. As of April 2024, KNDS France also offered its turret T40 on the VBCI-2 to Qatar. Discussions for a first batch of 120 VBCI-2 were ongoing.

=== Failed bids ===
Bulgaria (183)
In 2017, Bulgaria invited companies to submit offers for a future IFV and other combat support vehicles (reconnaissance, combat engineering, ambulance) based on a 8×8 armoured vehicles. Over time, several offers were made by various competitors (GTK Boxer, Mowag Piranha V, KNDS VBCI 2, Patria AMV^{XP}, Freccia, Otokar Arma, FNSS PARS). The Boxer was eliminated with the VBCI in December 2017 because they did not fulfil the conditions of the program, while the Piranha V and the Patria AMV^{XP} did.
After years of discussions and cancellations, an offer made by General Dynamics Land Systems for a much smaller and cheaper Stryker won the contract in September 2023, 183 vehicles for USD 1.37 billion.
Denmark (309)
The Piranha V was selected over the CV90 Armadillo the PMMC G5 and the VBCI.
Lithuania
In 2016, the GTK Boxer was selected over the Iveco SUPERAV, the PARS III, the Patria AMV, the Piranha V, the Stryker and the VBCI-2.
Poland
In 2002, Poland selected the future multi-role vehicle intended to replace the OT-64 SKOT, the BMP-1, some command vehicles, mortar carriers and some armoured engineering vehicles. The competitor for this contract were the Piranha IV, the Pandur 2 (8×8) the Patria AMV, the KTO Ryś 8×8 and the VBCI.
This Patria AMV won the competition, and has been manufactured in Poland under the name KTO Rosomak.
Spain
In 2015, a program to replace the VEC-M1, the BMR-M1 and part of the M113 fleet was launched by the Spanish Army. The competitors were the Boxer, the Freccia, the Patria AMV, the Piranha V, the SEP and the VBCI.
In September 2015, the competition was won by GDELS with the Piranha V. In December 2019, the Spanish Government cancelled the program, and relaunched the competition.
In August 2020, the Piranha V of GDELS Santa Barbara Sistemas in collaboration with Indra Sistemas and Sapa Placencia won again the competition for a first batch of 348 vehicles for €1.74 billion. It is known as the Dragon VCR.
United Arab Emirates (400)
In 2017, the UAE military ordered 400 Otokar Rabdan 8×8. It was selected over the GTK Boxer, the Patria AMV, the Piranha V and the VBCI in a competition initially intended for 700 vehicles.
United Kingdom (623)
The UK initially participated in the development of the GTK Boxer with Germany and the Netherlands. The collaboration started in 1999. In 2003, the UK decided to leave the development of that vehicle. In 2004, the FRES programme was launched. In June 2007, 3 vehicles were pre-selected for the FRES UV programme, the GTK Boxer, the Piranha V and the VBCI. The Piranha V was selected as preferred bidder in November 2007 and announced in May 2008. It was not followed by orders due to budget crunch, and as of December 2008, the absence of contract meant that the Piranha V was not the preferred bidder anymore.
In 2014, a new programme, the FUV (Future Utility Programme) was launched, and the VBCI was considered again and tested by the UK. But the evaluation did not lead to the selection of the vehicle.
In 2018, the UK rejoined the Boxer programme through the MIV programme (Mechanised Infantry Vehicle).

=== Evaluation only ===
Australia
The VBCI participated to the project LAND 400 Phase 2 for the production of the successor of the ASLAV named "CRV". In July 2016, the Boxer and the Patria AMV-35 were pre-selected for a final competition. Among the other competitors were the LAV 6.0 and the Sentinel II (based on the Terrex 2).
Canada
108 CCV + 30 in option (Close Combat Vehicle) offered by Nexter in association with Bombardier and Raytheon, but the programme was cancelled in 2013.
Lebanon
68 were considered by Lebanon with financial support from Saudi Arabia as of 2014, but the VBCI was not shortlisted.

== See also ==
=== Comparable vehicles ===
- KTO Rosomak – (Poland)
- BTR-4 – (Ukraine)
- Boxer (armoured fighting vehicle) – (Germany, Netherlands)
- CM-32 armoured vehicle – (Taiwan)
- Eitan AFV – (Israel)
- FNSS Pars – (Turkey)
- Freccia IFV – (Italy)
- Iveco SuperAV – (Italy)
- K808 White Tiger – (South Korea)
- LAV 6 – (Canada)
- Mowag Piranha III – (Switzerland)
- Mowag Piranha IV – (Switzerland)
- Mowag Piranha V – (Switzerland)
- Otokar Arma – (Turkey)
- Pandur II – (Austria)
- Patria AMV – (Finland)
- Stryker – (United States, Canada)
- TATA Kestrel – (India)
- Terrex ICV – (Singapore)
- VPK-7829 Bumerang – (Russia)
