= VCBI =

VCBI can mean:

- Bandaranaike International Airport near Colombo, Sri Lanka
- Véhicule Blindé de Combat d'Infanterie (VBCI, "Armoured vehicle for infantry combat")
