= OTO Melara =

Subsidiary of Finmeccanica

OTO Melara S.p.A.
- Type: S.p.A. (corporation)
- Industry: Defence Systems
- Founded: 1905
- Defunct: December 31, 2015 (aged 110) (merged into Leonardo
- Headquarters: Rome, Italy
- Number of locations: La Spezia
- Area served: Worldwide
- Products: Land, naval and air defence systems
- Parent: Leonardo
- Website: https://www.leonardo.com/en/home

OTO Melara was a subsidiary of the Italian company Finmeccanica, today Leonardo, active in the defence sector, with factories in Brescia and La Spezia.

From 1 January 2016, the activities of OTO Melara merged into Leonardo's Defence Systems Division, within the Electronics, Defence and Security Systems Sector.

== History ==
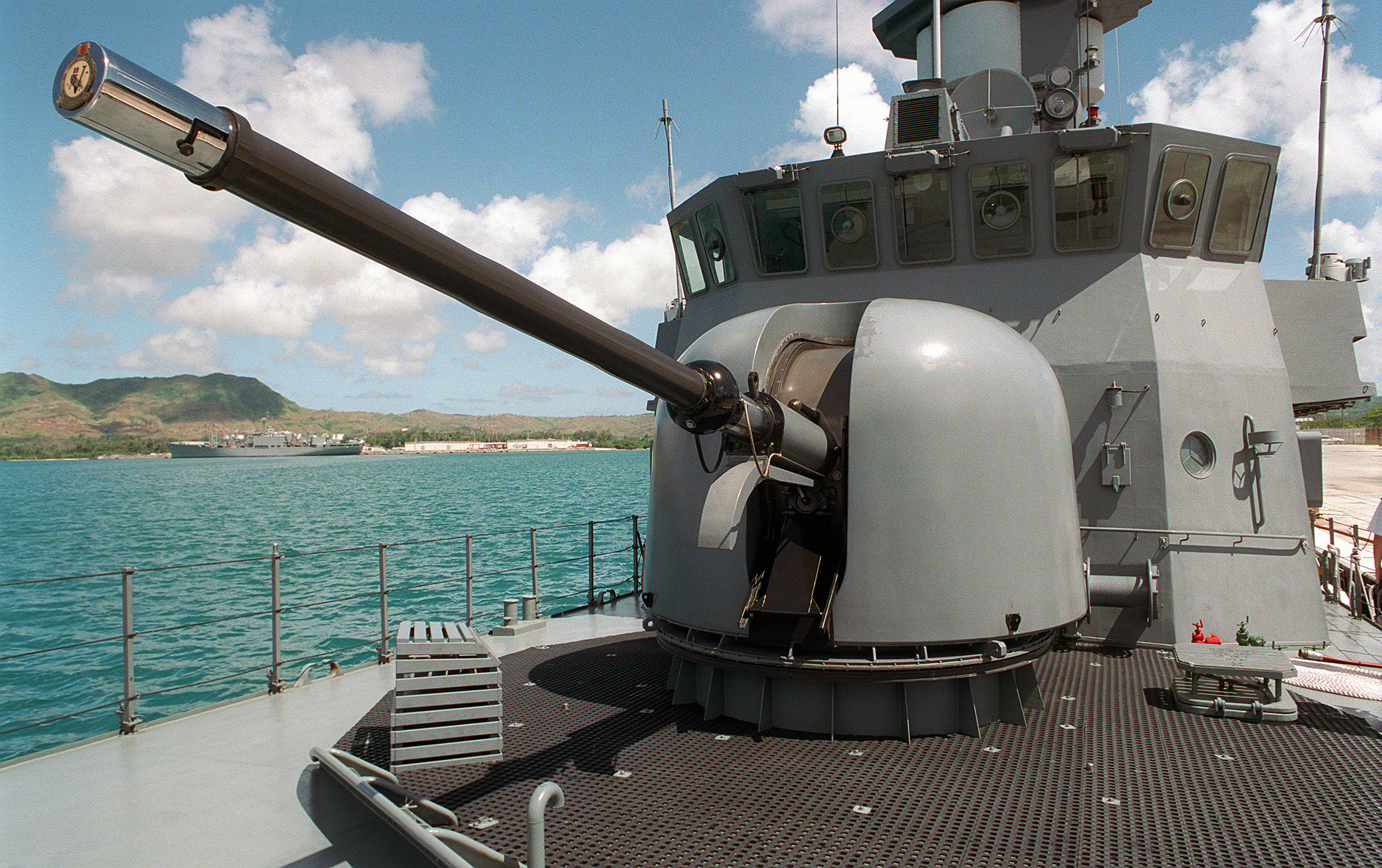
Oto Melara 76/62

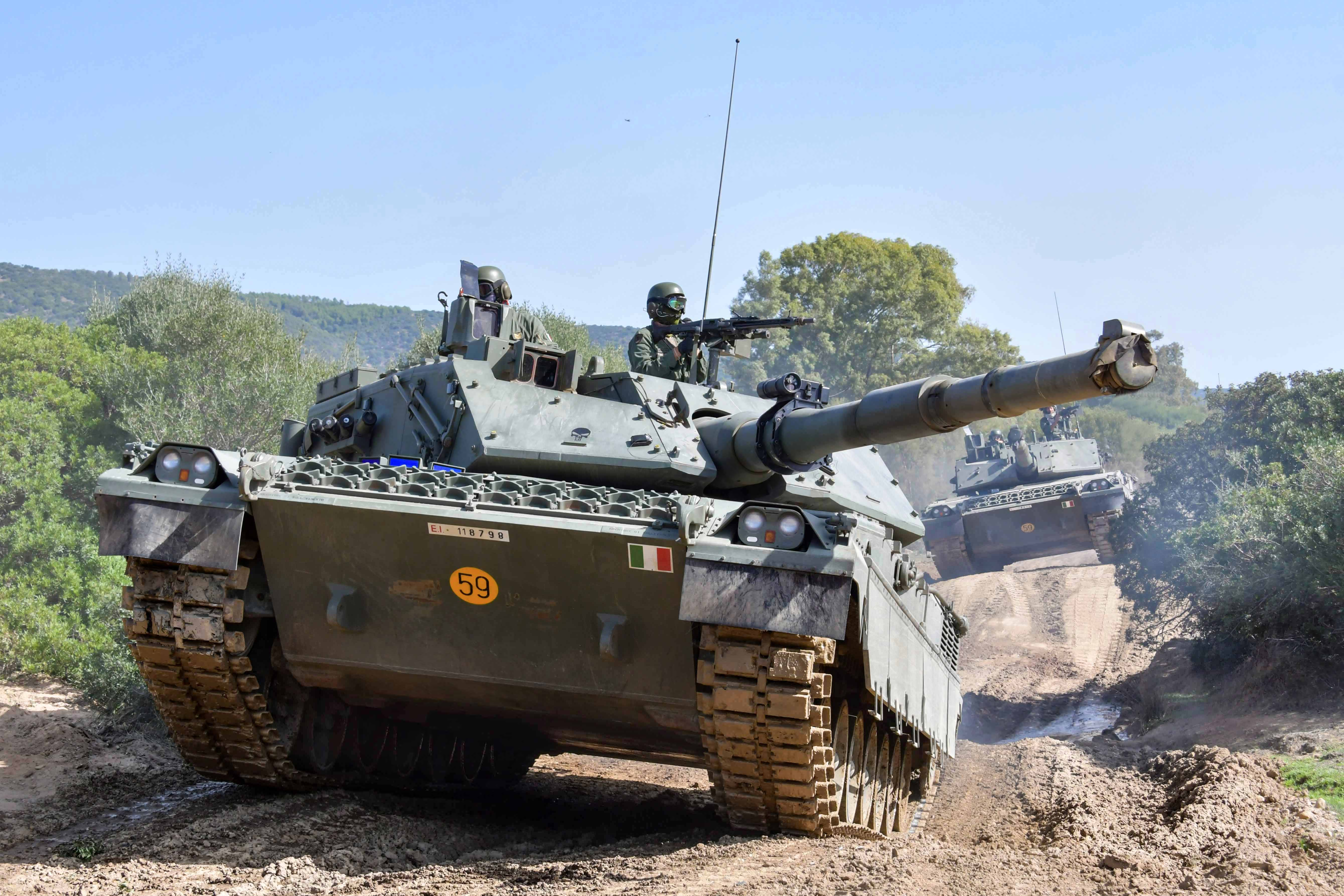
Ariete MBT

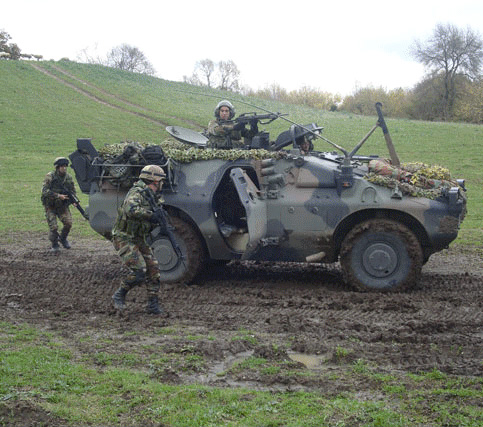
Puma APC

=== Pre–World War I ===
It was founded in 1905 as a joint venture of Vickers and Terni Steelworks, Cantiere navale fratelli Orlando and Cantieri navali Odero. Investment was also provided by Giuseppe Orlando and Attilio Odero. During World War I, Vickers Terni produced many weapons with calibre 40 mm and upwards. In 1929 the company was renamed Odero Terni Orlando with the abbreviation OTO. During World War II, mostly heavy guns for battleships were produced.

=== Post–World War II ===
In 1953 the company took the name OTO Melara.

Before Italy joined NATO, OTO Melara produced civilian-use products, like tractors and looms, but quickly returned to the production of weapons. On 1 December 2001, the naval artillery division of OTO Melara merged with that of Breda Meccanica Bresciana to form Otobreda. The combined entity produces the DARDO CIWS, Otobreda 76 mm and Otobreda 127/54 Compact naval guns. OTO Melara's land defence operations are part of the Leonardo conglomerate.

== Main products ==
=== Vehicles manufactured ===
- Ariete Main Battle Tank
- OF-40 Main battle tank
- B1 Centauro Wheeled Tank Destroyer
- Dardo Infantry Fighting Vehicle
- VBM Freccia 8×8 Wheeled Infantry Fighting Vehicle
- Puma 6×6 and Puma 4×4 Wheeled Armoured Personnel Carrier
- Palmaria self-propelled artillery
- Otomatic anti-aircraft tank (SPAAG)

=== Weapons manufactured ===
- OTO Melara Mod 56 105mm/L14 Pack Howitzer
- OTO Marlin 40
- OTO Breda 120/44 (for the Ariete tank)
- Hitfact turret (3-operators turret)
  - Hitfact mk1
    - OTO Breda 105/52
  - Hitfact mk2
    - OTO Breda 105/52
    - OTO Breda 120/45
- Hitfist two-man turret armed with a 25mm or 30mm automatic cannon and 7.62mm coaxial machine gun (plus two TOW launchers as option)
- Hitfist OWS Remotely operated turret armed with a 25mm or 30mm automatic cannon and 7.62mm coaxial machine gun (plus two TOW launchers as option)
- Hitrole Remote Weapon Station for 7.62mm or 12.7mm machine gun or 40mm automatic grenade launcher
- Small calibre naval turrets 12.7 mm LIONFISH and 20 mm LINOFISH-20
- Otobreda 127/54 Compact naval gun
- Otobreda 127/64 Lightweight naval gun
- 76/62mm Allargato
- Otobreda 76 mm naval gun
- Otomat Anti-ship missile
- Skyguard "Aspide" Anti-Air missile system
- SIDAM 25 anti-aircraft gun
- DARDO CIWS a twin 40mm naval gun mounting
- MSS-1.2 Anti tank guided missile
- GBU-39 Small Diameter Bomb under license from Boeing

=== Ammunition manufactured ===
- Vulcano (munition) - 76/127/155mm

In the last decade the company has produced between 900 and 1000 GBU-31 and GBU-32 JDAMs on license. At the moment it is working on the production of 500 GBU-39s for the Aeronautica Militare.

The naval defence operations produce a wide range of automatic naval artillery, rocket and missile launchers and remote controlled small calibre defence cannons.

== Tractor ==
From 1949 to 1961, the company manufactured agricultural tractors. Among the 4,700 tractors produced, both wheel drive and crawler drive were used.

== See also ==
- List of Italian companies
