= Otokar Arma =

Turkish armoured combat vehicle

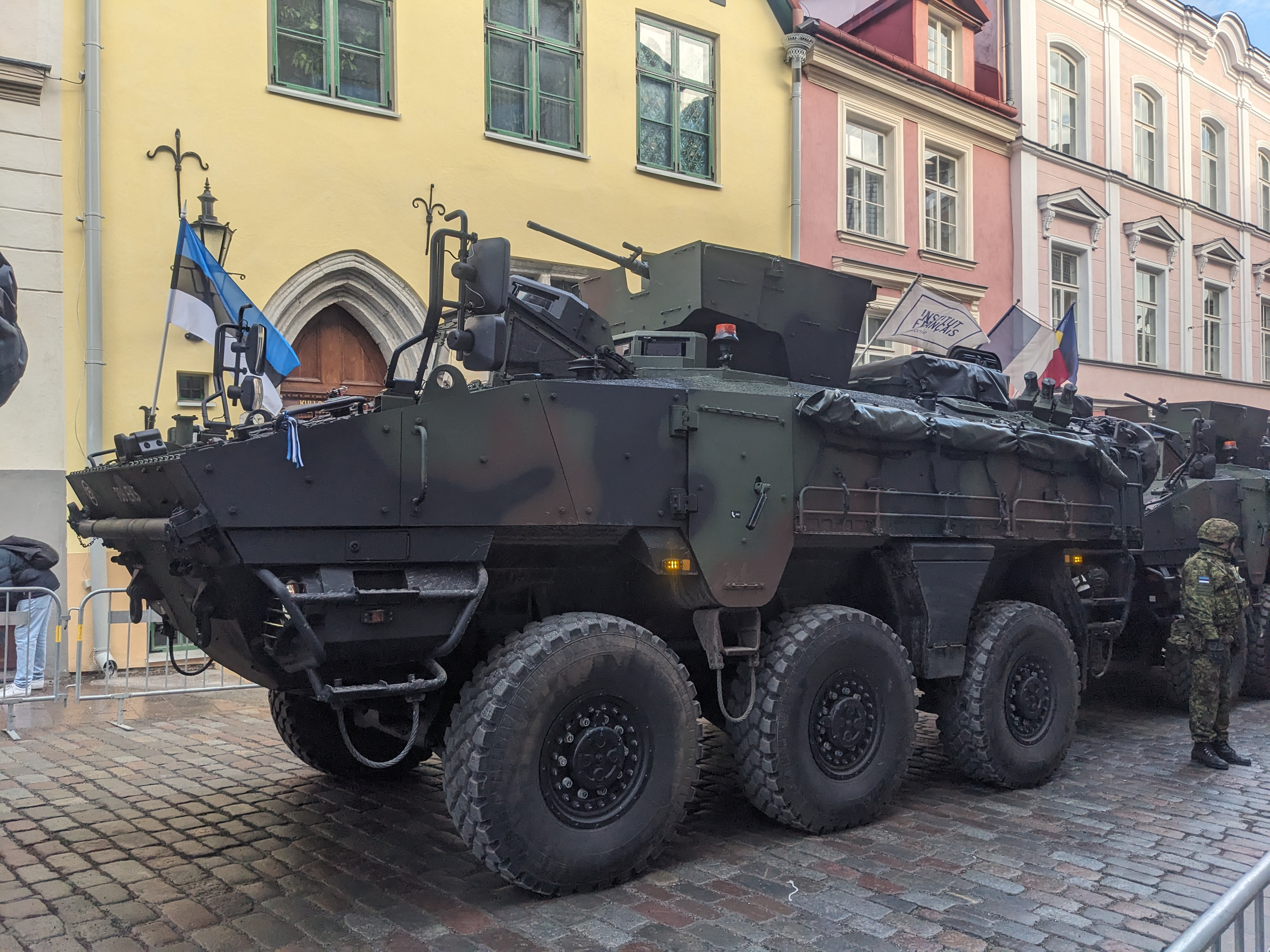
- Arma 6х6 of the Estonian Defence Forces
- Type: Armoured combat vehicle
- Place of origin: Turkey

Service history
- Used by: See Operators
- Wars: Saudi Arabian-led intervention in Yemen

Production history
- Designer: Otokar
- Manufacturer: Otokar
- Variants: Armored personnel carrier, Infantry fighting vehicle

Specifications
- Mass: 18.5 t. (6х6); 24 t. (8×8)
- Length: 6.4 m
- Width: 2.7 m (6х6)
- Height: 2.2 m (6х6)
- Crew: 2+8 (6х6)
- Armor: 12.5 mm (6х6)
- Main armament: One 12.7 mm or 7.62 mm machine gun or 30 mm gun or 40 mm automatic grenade launcher or 14.5 mm machine gun
- Engine: Water-cooled turbo diesel 450 hp
- Power/weight: 24.3 hp/tonne (6х6); 18.75 hp/tonne (8х8)
- Suspension: Hydropneumatic
- Operational range: 700 km (6х6); 750 km (8×8)
- Maximum speed: 105 km/h

Otokar Arma is a 6×6 and 8×8 amphibious wheeled armored combat vehicle family designed and developed by Otokar. The vehicle is a modular multi-wheel configurable with a monocoque steel hull.

== Development ==
Otokar developed the vehicle to target the Turkish Land Forces’ Special Purpose Tactical Wheeled Armored Vehicle (Özel Maksatlı Taktik Tekerlekli Zırhlı Araç, ÖMTTZA) project. It was first presented to the public at Eurosatory 2010. Arma vehicle's development started in 2007 as a company-funded development project for home and export markets.

=== Service history ===
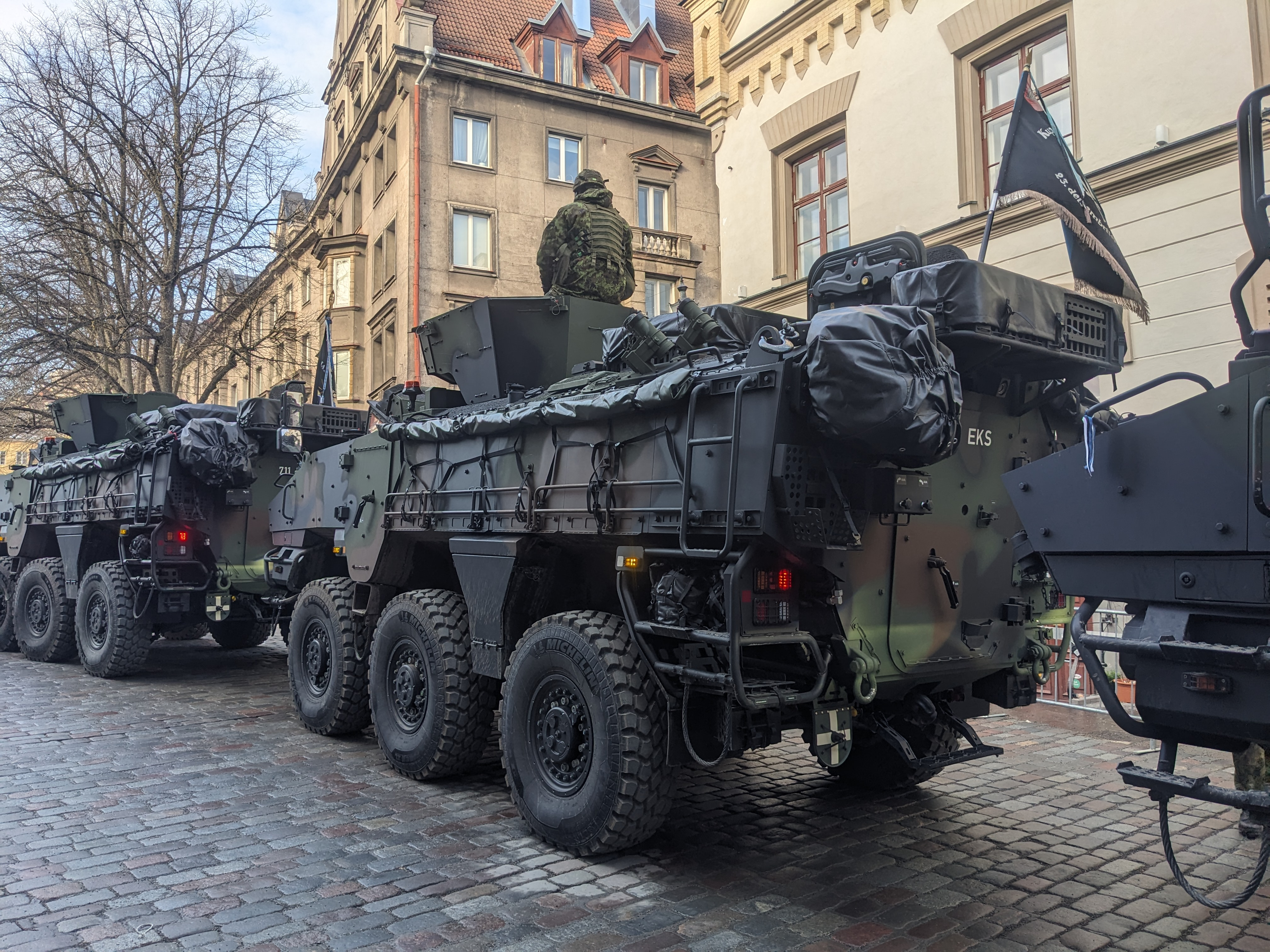
Otokar Arma 6×6 in Estonian service. View from the back.

During the Saudi Arabian-led intervention in the Yemeni Civil War, Bahrain deployed a mechanized company equipped with the 6×6 Arma.

== Variants ==
=== Rabdan ===
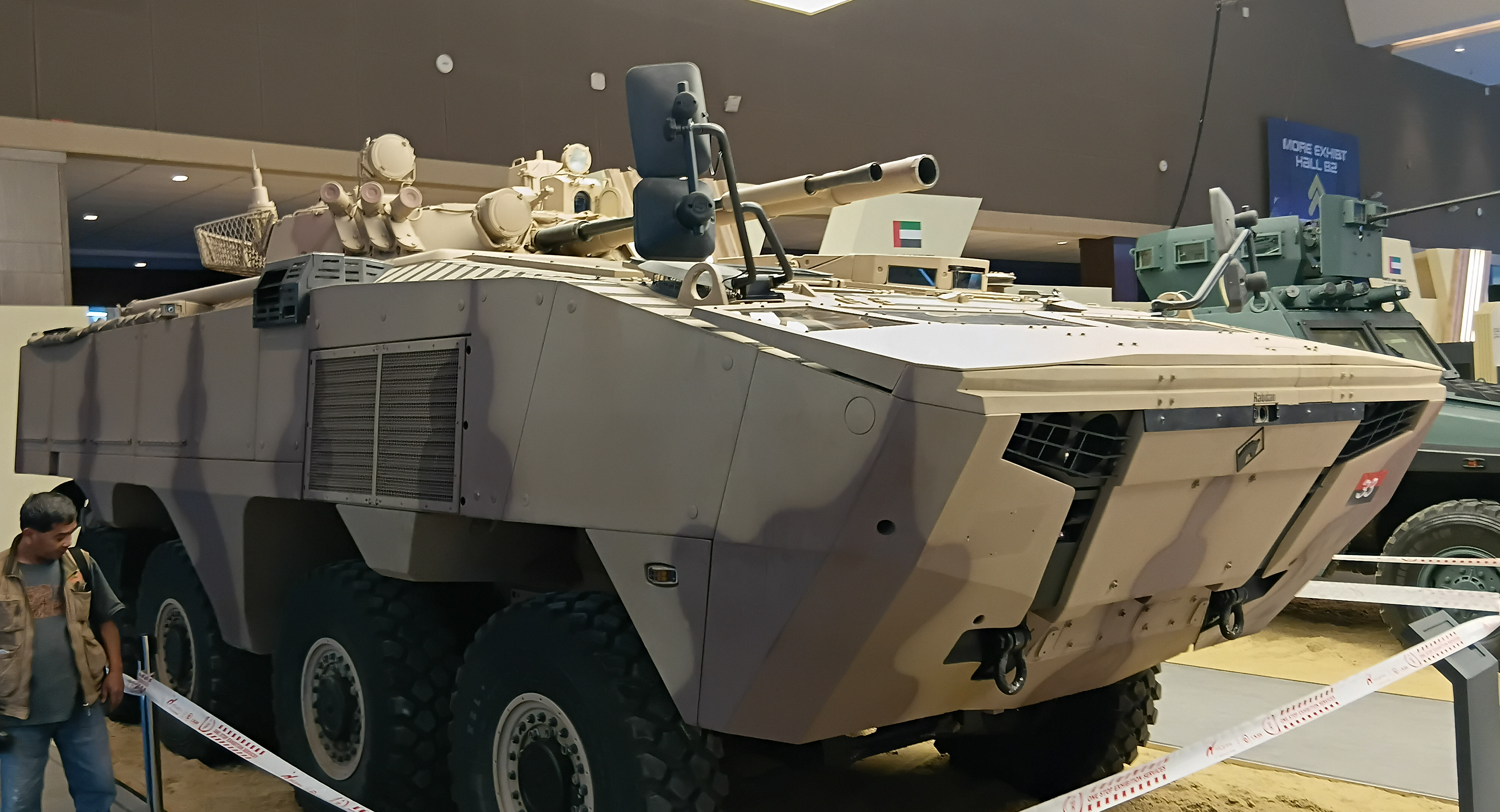
Rabdan 8×8 with BMP-3 turret

In 2016, Otokar teamed up with Emirati company Al Jasoor to develop a new 8×8 vehicle for the United Arab Emirates Army. Al Jasoor, which is a joint company between Otokar UAE (49%) and Tawazun Holdings (51%), was established to create and develop a unique variant based on the Arma 8×8 called Rabdan in the United Arab Emirates. The Rabdan was created to replace the United Arab Emirates Army BMP-3 Infantry fighting vehicles. Al Jasoor Rabdan and Otokar Arma are different in multiple ways. The Rabdan is heavier at 28 tons (vs Arma 24 tons) and has a length and width of 15 cm and 55 cm. The Rabdan also provides small arms fire protection of up to STANAG 4569 Level 4 and mine blast protection of up to STANAG Level 4a and Level 4b.

Since the Rabdan was created to replace the BMP-3, the BMP-3 turrets are also configurable on the Rabdan. The Rabdan is equipped with a 100 mm 2A70 semi-automatic rifled gun, a 30 mm 2A72 cannon, and a 7.62 mm machine gun.

Al Jasoor is expected to produce up to 700 Rabdans for $661 million for the United Arab Emirates Army.

== Design ==
=== Armament ===
There are five different weapon systems that have been used in the Arma. The Mizrak 30 is a 30mm autonomous main gun, which can be controlled by either the gunner or commander from within the vehicle, and comes with a 7.62mm co-axle machine gun. The Mizrak 30 also is high tech, as it comes with digital fire control, stabilized sights (with the sights also having thermal), a laser range finder, etc. The Mizrak S 30 is similar to the Mizrak 30 in fields like armaments and tech, but it has the advantage of being lighter.

The ÜÇOK turret system is a remote control weapon station, and is a stabilized machine gun platform which can be equipped with either a 12.7 mm machine gun, a 7.62 mm machine gun, or 40 mm automatic grenade launcher. Like both the Mizrak models, the ÜÇOK system can be operated from inside the vehicle, but can also be operated with from without. The ÜÇOK also has similar tech to the Mizrak 30 and Mizrak S 30.

The BAŞOK system is a remote controlled 7.62 mm machine gun, and also has similar technological features as the Mizraks and the ÜÇOK.

The KESKIN is also a remote-controlled system, which can be operated with a 14.5 mm machine gun, 12.7 mm machine gun, 7.62 mm machine gun, or a 40 mm automatic grenade launcher. It is composed of similar technology to the Mizraks, the ÜÇOK, and the BAŞOK, but also comes with 360º situational awareness.

=== Protection ===
No details have been released on its ballistic protection, but since it is required to be amphibious, armouring is not expected to exceed STANAG 4569 Level II. 425 mm ground clearance should help achieve mine protection to Level IIIB or higher. Arma's ballistic and anti-mine protection is provided by high hardness monocoque steel hull and all personnel are seated on anti-mine seats.

=== Propulsion ===
The Arma 6×6 is motorized with a 450 hp water-cooled turbo diesel capable of running on F-34 or F-54 fuel drives the wheels through an automatic gearbox and single-speeded transfer box, giving it a top speed of 105 km/h and a power/weight ratio of 24.3 hp/ton. This also powers the onboard 24V direct current DC electrical system, which incorporates two maintenance-free 125 Ah batteries and a 3.3 kW converter. Arma's front two axles are steerable enabling it to make a turning radius of 7.85 m and the vehicle rides on independent hydro-pneumatic suspension, offering respectable off-road mobility and comfort. It can negotiate 45-degree approach and departure angles leading onto 60 percent inclines and 30 percent side-slopes. It can also cross 1.2m-wide trenches and climb over 60 cm obstacles.

=== Accessories ===
The Arma can be transported by a Lockheed C-130 Hercules transport plane. Standard equipment of Arma 6×6 includes NBC protection system and air conditioning. Arma can be driven in 6×6 or 6×4 modes depending upon the terrain conditions. The vehicle is amphibious and driven by two hydraulically driven propellers in water, allowing a high seagoing performance with a pivot turn capability.

== Operators ==
=== Current operators ===
Bahrain (73)
In 2010, Bahrain procured 73 units for $74 million.

Estonia (~130)
In October 2023, Estonia ordered 230 APCs from Otokar for €130 million, about half of which are said to be the Arma 6×6 variant. Deliveries began in 2025.

Kazakhstan (unknown, alleged order of 834)
Kazakhstan was reported to be ordering 834 Otokar Arma vehicles for a total price of 4.4 billion USD in 2023. While the order was never officially confirmed several Otokar Arma vehicles in 8×8 configuration were spotted participating in Kazakhstan’s Victory Day parade on the 7 May 2025, although the actual number of vehicles on order or in service with Kazakh Ground Forces remains unknown.

Pakistan (N/A)
Kazakh variant Taimas 8x8 in service.

United Arab Emirates (400)
In 2017 400, Rabdan variants were delivered to United Arab Emirates Army. 700 planned

=== Tender ===
Chile (> 450 - 500)
The Chilean Army was looking for a successor to its 160 Piraña I 6×6 and 30 Piraña I 8×8. On a long term perspective, more than 200 vehicles are expected to be purchased, but in the meantime, a first phase of the replacement includes a tender for 82 8×8 armoured vehicles. The requirement mentions a maximum weight of 38 tons. The deadline for the selection is dated 8 April 2025. Among the known competitors were:
- Altuğ by the Turkish BMC
- Patria AMV by the Finnish Patria Group
- Arma by the Turkish Otokar
- Freccia by the Italian Iveco
- K808 White Tiger by the South Korean Hyundai Rotem
- Pandur II 8×8 by the Czech Excalibur Army
- Stryker 8×8 by the United States US army (the only offer for already used units)
- Terrex ICV by the Singapore ST Engineering
