= Hitfist =

Armoured vehicle turret

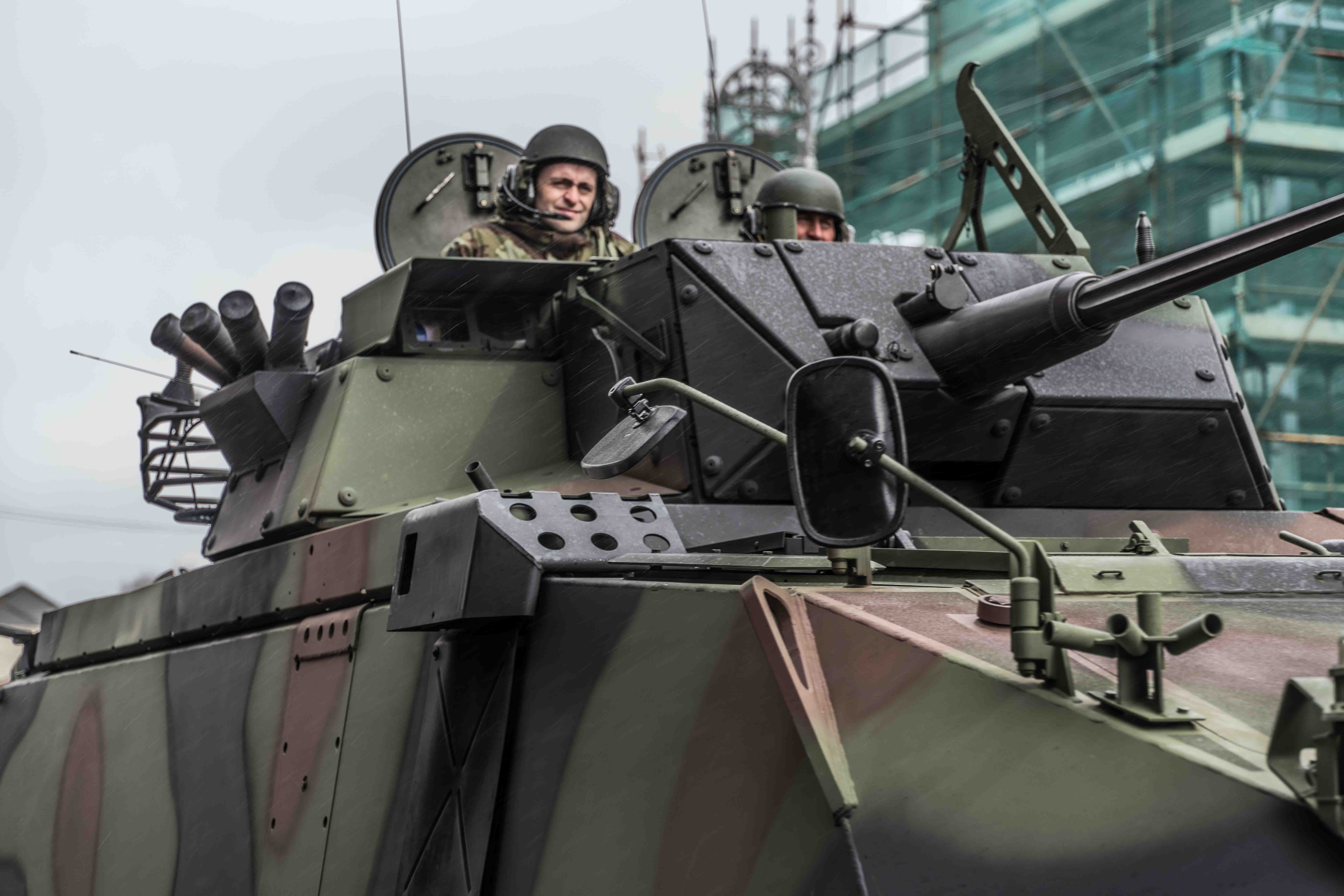
A Hitfist turret on a Piranha IIIH Medium Reconnaissance Vehicle

Oto Melara Hitfist is a two-man turret for armored vehicles developed by the Italian Oto Melara company. The turrets are designed to mount a 25mm Oerlikon KBA or 30/40mm ATK Mk44 Bushmaster II autocannon. The main armament may mount a co-axial machine gun. A variant allows the operator to aim and fire anti-tank missiles.

The turret, and its weapons, can be operated by a single individual.

Oto Melara also sells a smaller remotely operated turret, named Hitrole, that mounts smaller weapons, like machine guns and automatic grenade launchers.

Oto Melara sells a similar appearing remotely operated turret, called Hitfist OWS.

The 30mm variant of the Hitfist turret adds 2,670 kilograms (5,890 lb) to a vehicle's weight.

== Operators ==
Italian Army – 483 turrets
200 equipped on the Dardo. The turret is equipped with the following armament:
- Oerlikon KBA 25mm gun
- MG 42/59 7.62 mm coaxial machine gun
- TOW ATGM
226 used on the VBM Freccia. The turret is equipped with the following armament:
- Oerlikon KBA 25mm gun
- MG 42/59 7.62 mm coaxial machine gun
- 226 in service
41 ordered to be used on the VBM Freccia EVO iFV (up to 180). The turret will be equipped with the following armament:
- Oerlikon KBA 25mm gun
- MG 42/59 7.62 mm coaxial machine gun
- Spike LR Missile
- JANUS high performance, stabilised, day/night, all weather multi-sensor
16 ordered to be used with the KF-41 Lynx as part of the A2CS programme in a first order, with more planned in the future:
- Leonardo X-Gun 30×173mm
(Republic of Ireland) Irish Army – 6 HITFIST–30
6 Piranha IIIH Medium Reconnaissance Vehicle equipped with 30mm HITFIST variant.
(Poland) Polish Army – 359 HITFIST–30P
359 equipped on the KTO Rosomak (delivery 2019-2021)
- 30 mm Orbital ATK MK44 Bushmaster auto-cannon
- UKM-2000C 7.62mm coaxial machine gun
