= Dardo (infantry fighting vehicle) =

Italian infantry fighting vehicle

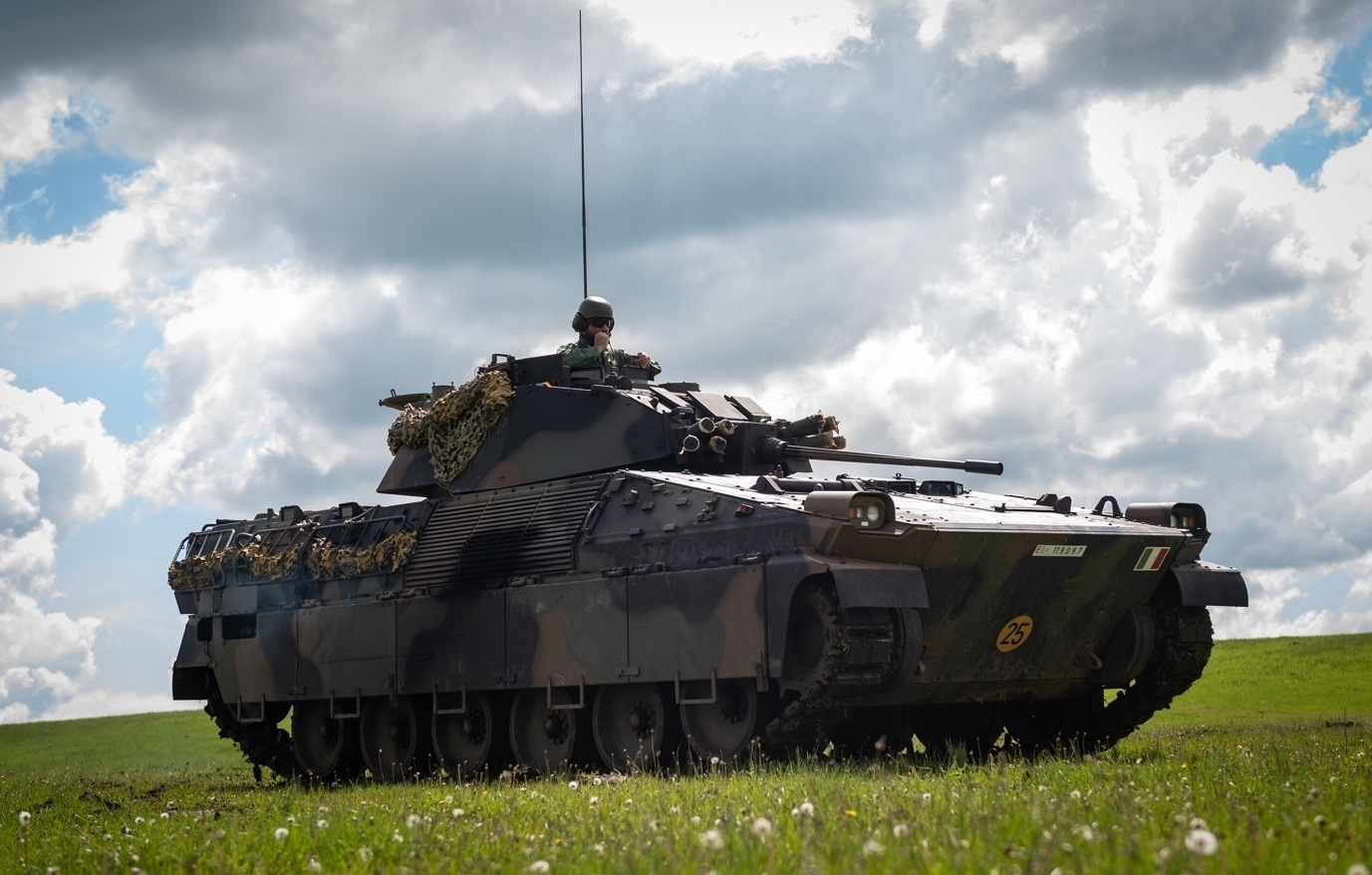
- Dardo IFV
- Type: Infantry fighting vehicle
- Place of origin: Italy

Service history
- In service: 1998–present
- Wars: Iraq War, War in Afghanistan

Production history
- Designed: 1980s
- Produced: 1998–present
- No. built: 200

Specifications
- Mass: 23.4 tonnes (25.8 tons)
- Length: 6.7 m (22 ft)
- Width: 3.0 m (9.8 ft)
- Height: 2.64 m (8.66 ft)
- Crew: 3 (commander, gunner, driver) + 6 troops
- Armor: modular Front armour against 25mm APDS
- Main armament: 25 mm Oerlikon KBA automatic cannon; 2x TOW ATGM (optional)
- Secondary armament: 7.62 mm coaxial machine gun; Smoke-grenade launchers
- Engine: Iveco – Fiat 6V MTCA turbodiesel 512 hp (382.2 kW)
- Power/weight: 24.5 hp/tonne
- Suspension: hydropneumatic torsion bar
- Operational range: 600 km (372.8 mi)
- Maximum speed: 70 km/h (43.5 mi/h)

The Dardo is an infantry fighting vehicle designed for the Italian Army as a replacement for the M113 APC. It is designed and built by the Iveco Fiat Oto Melara Syndicated Company based in Rome. Iveco is responsible for the hull and propulsion systems, while Oto Melara is responsible for the weapons and fire control systems.

== Description ==
=== Armament ===
The Dardo is primarily armed with the 25mm Oerlikon KBA automatic cannon firing 600 rounds per minute, with 200 rounds of ready to fire ammunition stored in the turret. Two 7.62mm NATO machine guns are also installed in the turret, one coaxially mounted with the main gun. Five rifle ports, two on each side of the hull and one in the rear are provided to allow troops inside to use their personal weapons, if needed.

Fire control is provided by the Galileo Avionica Hitfist integrated fire control system, which is capable of measuring target speed and range. The commander is provided with six episcope sights, which provide 360° field of view. The cupola can be further fitted with a panoramic stabilised sight. Additionally, a laser range finder and a thermal imager are provided for the gunner. The commander is equipped with a monitor that displays the view from the gunner night vision system.

For dealing with heavy armoured threats, two BGM-71 TOW anti tank missiles can be installed, one on each side of the turret. These missiles have a maximum range of approximately 4 km.

=== Self protection ===
The Dardo hull is built from welded aluminum alloy with add on steel armour plates for increased protection. Over the frontal arc, the vehicle is protected against 25mm APDS projectiles. The side armour protects against 14.5mm API projectiles. Four 80mm smoke grenade launchers are installed on each side of the turret.

=== Propulsion ===
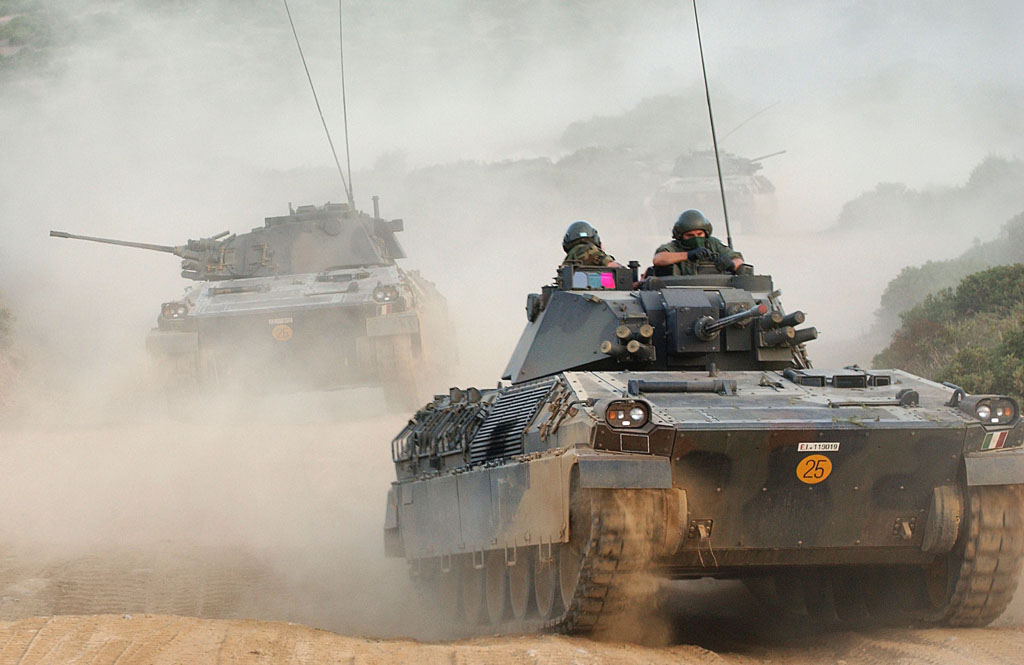
Dardo in action

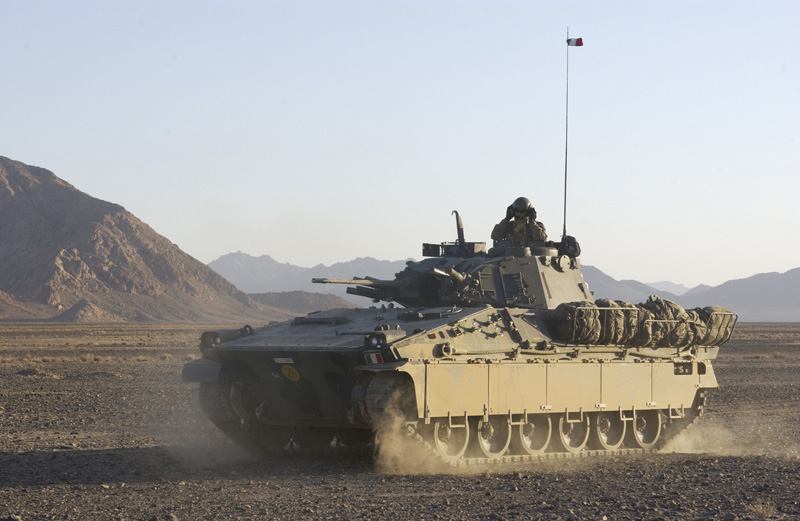
Dardo in Afghanistan

The Dardo is powered by an Iveco V6 turbo-charged after-cooled diesel engine delivering 512 hp (382.2 kW). This drives a ZF-designed automatic transmission system, which is manufactured under license by Iveco Fiat. The transmission system has four forward and two reverse gears, and incorporates the steering system and the hydraulic retarder.

The running gear consists of six dual rubber-lined road wheels, with three return rollers on each side and connector type tracks. The suspension consists of a torsion bar, bumper and a hydraulic shock absorber on each suspension arm. Disc brakes on each of the final drives controlled by a transmission retarder provide the braking.

Together, this allows the Dardo to achieve speeds in excess of 70 km/h, maneuver on gradients of more than 60% and ford waters up to a depth of 1.5 m.

== Future variants ==
The Dardo IFVs currently in service with the Italian Army are fitted with the "Hitfist" IFV turret. The chassis is intended to be the basic model of a family of vehicles, which may include a 120 mm mortar carrier, command (C3I) vehicle, and ambulance.

== Combat history ==
Dardo IFVs were deployed with the Italian Army as part of the Italian contribution to Operation Iraqi Freedom in 2004. 10 were also deployed in Afghanistan to reinforce the Italian Battlegroups there. Also, some are in use with the Italian UNIFIL contingent.

== Operators ==
Video of 1st Bersaglieri training in 2021

- Italy – 200 vehicles
  - 1st Bersaglieri Regiment, Bersaglieri Brigade "Garibaldi"
  - 8th Bersaglieri Regiment, Bersaglieri Brigade "Garibaldi"
  - 11th Bersaglieri Regiment, Armored Brigade "Ariete"

== See also ==
- ASCOD – (Spain, Austria)
- Bionix – (Singapore)
- BMP-3 – (Soviet Union, Russia)
- CV90 – (Sweden)
- K21 – (South Korea)
- M2 Bradley – (United States)
- Puma IFV – (Germany)
- Mitsubishi Type 89 IFV – (Japan)
- Tulpar IFV – (Turkey)
- Abhay IFV – (India)
- Makran IFV – (Iran)
