= Splitterskyddad EnhetsPlattform =

Armoured vehicle

SEP
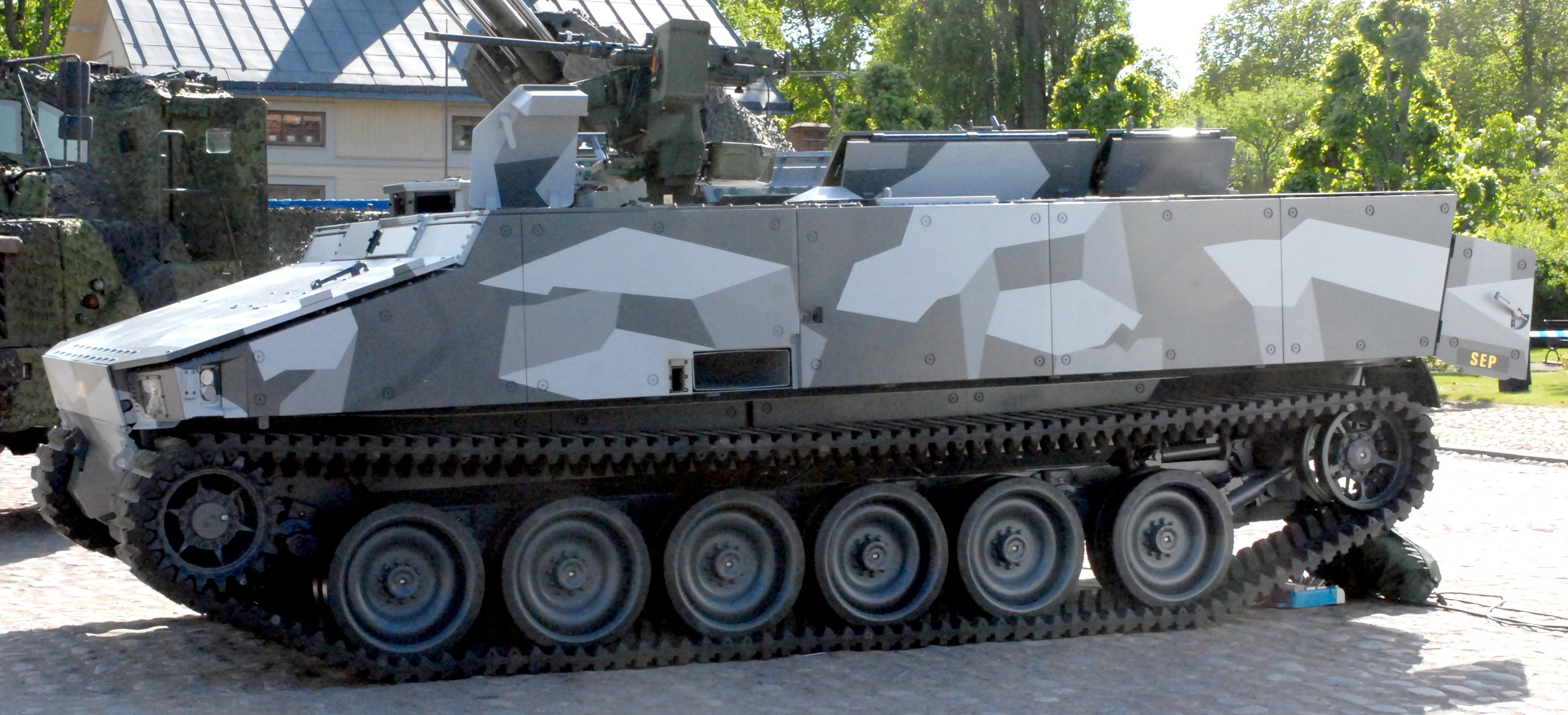
- Tracked version of BAE Hägglunds SEP
- Place of origin: Sweden

Specifications
- Mass: 13,500 kg (29,800 lb)
- Length: 5.9 m (19 ft)
- Width: 2.9 m (9 ft 6 in)
- Height: 2.0 m (6 ft 7 in)
- Crew: 2; 8 passengers
- Engine: 2 × diesel 2 × 270 hp
- Power/weight: 15.6 kW/t (21.2 PS/t) (max weight)
- Suspension: 8×8 wheeled or tracked
- Operational range: 600 km (370 mi)
- Maximum speed: Over 120 km/h (70 mph) on road

The SEP modular armoured vehicle (Splitterskyddad enhetsplattform), Swedish for "Fragmentation Protected Standard Platform", is a hybrid diesel-electric powered armoured fighting vehicle developed by BAE Systems AB. The vehicle is codenamed "Thor". The first demonstration models were produced in 2000 (tracked) and 2003 (wheeled). It was originally contracted by the Swedish Defence Materiel Administration. The series-hybrid electric drivetrains for both the wheeled (SEP-W) and two generations of tracked (SEP-T) vehicles were designed and manufactured by MAGTEC (Magnetic Systems Technology Ltd, Sheffield, UK). SEP-W was equipped with in-wheel HMED (Hub-Mounted Electric Drive) units, each rated at over 100 kW and producing 20,000Nm at each wheel in low range. This performance gave the vehicle individual wheel speed, position and torque control, providing electronic limited-slip differential, torque-vectoring, and importantly on-demand skid-steering (fully laden on dry tarmac), enhanced packaging and protection, and greatly improved suspension travel. SEP-T was equipped with a novel 'cross-drive' pack incorporating concentric twin-traction and twin-steer motors, giving fully electric 'drive by wire' steering via the outboard gearboxes. In both types of vehicle, two high-performance diesel engine/generator sets were installed, providing dual redundancy and further protecting driver and co-driver from side ballistic impacts/penetration. Power scheduling and operating points for the generator sets provided optimised fuel usage and performance, thus reducing the requirements for refuelling support in the field. The design of the drivetrains in both vehicle types permitted novel vehicle architectures and optimised crew and payload packaging, without compromising suspension/transmission design or performance.

Both vehicle types were put through extensive testing of performance, durability, EMC etc., and were designed and constructed to allow straightforward scale-up into volume production.

== Development ==
The project began in 1994. Sweden's original requirement was 1600 vehicles. The vehicles were planned to enter service in 2014 and the modular payload configuration was expected to allow up to 24 variants.

In February 2008, the Swedish Armed Forces announced the cancellation of the SEP programme. The reasons stated were a 'lack of an international collaborative partner' which prevented the Swedish armed forces from continuing the project alone. The vehicle was dropped from the British FRES programme in July 2007.

In 2009 BAE announced that Kongsberg Devotek would develop gears and transmissions for the vehicle.

Later Sweden decided to buy the Finnish Patria AMV. As of July 2009, no country is considering the vehicle.

== See also ==
- Patria AMV
- MT-LB
