= Hitfist OWS =

Remotely-operated turret for armoured vehicles

Hitfist OWS is a remotely operated turret, for armored vehicles, developed by the Italian Oto Melara and derived from Hitfist.

The turrets are designed to mount a main armament of an autocannon of 25 or 30 mm caliber. The main armament may mount a co-axial machine gun. A variant allows the operator to aim and fire anti-tank guided missiles.

The turret is normally operated by a gunner who remains inside the vehicle, using remote optics and remote control. However, in the event of a power failure, the gunner can use a hatch primarily designed for reloading ammunition to aim and fire the turrets weapons manually.

In 2010 Oto Melara licensed Bumar-Labedy, a manufacturer in Poland, to manufacture the turret for Polish Armed Forces.

Oto Melara also sells a smaller remotely operated turret, named Hitrole, that mounts smaller weapons, like machine guns and automatic grenade launchers.

Oto Melara sells a similar appearing 2 man turret, called simply Hitfist, where the gunner and commander operate the turret, and its weapons, directly.
