= Badger IFV =

Infantry fighting vehicle

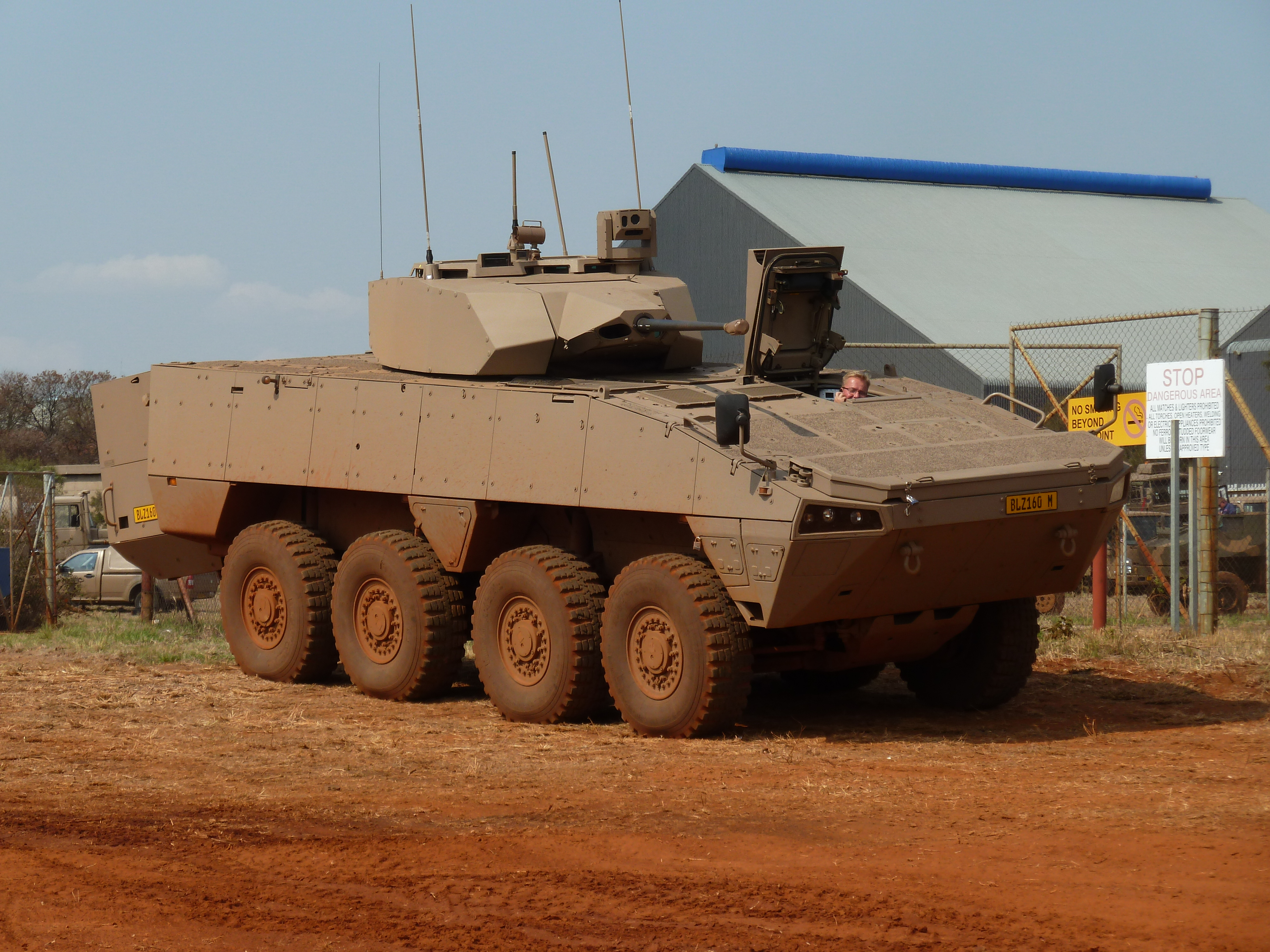
- Badger IFV Section Vehicle At Air Force Base Waterkloof
- Type: Infantry fighting vehicle
- Place of origin: Finland; South Africa

Service history
- Used by: South African Army

Production history
- Designer: Denel
- Designed: 2010
- Manufacturer: Denel Land Systems
- Unit cost: R42.5 million
- Produced: 2015-present

Specifications
- Mass: 28 Tons
- Length: 8.01 m (26.3 ft.)
- Width: 3.44 m (11.3ft.)
- Height: 2.83 m (9.28 ft.)
- Crew: 3 crew + 8 passengers
- Engine: Scania DI 12 diesel 540 hp
- Suspension: Hydropneumatic struts
- Fuel capacity: 450 litres
- Operational range: 1000 km (621 mi) on road / 750 km (466 mi) off-road
- Maximum speed: 104 km/h (64 mph)

The Badger IFV is an 8-wheeled Infantry fighting vehicle under development by Denel Land Systems of South Africa. The Badger IFV will be a modified and better protected version of the Finnish Patria AMV, tailored for the South African National Defence Force (SANDF) and modified for South African conditions.

The contract for the Badgers was awarded in 2007 and deliveries were originally scheduled to be completed in 2023. However, the project to develop the Badger has been much-delayed, and as of 2023 design work had not been completed. The project was deferred in 2024.

== History ==
The Badgers are intended to replace the South African Army's Ratel IFVs. Denel was selected to produce 264 Badgers under Project Hoefyster. The contract for the vehicles was signed in June 2007. At this time phase one of the project to design and develop five Badger variants was scheduled to be completed by 2012. This was to be followed by phase two, through which 238 Badgers were to be produced by November 2023.

Project Hoefyster has been much-delayed, and as of August 2022 no Badgers had been delivered to the South African Army. The defenceWeb news service has reported that the delays are "largely due to state capture at Denel".

In February 2022 Armscor recommended that Project Hoefyster be cancelled and the Ratels be upgraded instead of replaced. This was because the agency had judged that Denel lacked the staff needed to produce the Badgers, some of the vehicles' systems were obsolete and Denel was likely to lose money on the project. In July 2022 Defence and Military Veterans Minister Thandi Modise stated that it was unlikely that any Badgers would be delivered. However, by August that year Armscor had changed its view, stating that Denel was now capable of delivering the Badgers if the company was provided with a range of assistance.

In March 2023 Denel received a bailout from the South African Government to enable it to restart its production facilities. In April that year the Project Hoefyster Project Control Board recommended that the first phase of the project be completed. This would include completing the design and development of five Badger variants. In October 2023 Denel sought Armscor's agreement to complete design work of the variants by the end of 2025; this work was previously intended to have been completed by 2017.

It was reported in April 2024 that the Special Investigating Unit is investigating aspects of Project Hoefyster that are potentially fraudulent. This forms the largest part of a broader investigation into Denel. It has been alleged that a contract awarded in 2014 to the company VR Laser, which is linked to the Gupta family, to produce hulls for the Badgers was "fraught with irregularities". The Denel subsidiary LMT had originally been specified to undertake this work. Also in April 2024 it was announced that the number of Badgers that would be ordered had been reduced to 88, enough to equip a single battalion.

In November 2024 the Chief of the South African Army, Lieutenant General Lawrence Mbatha, announced that Project Hoefyster had been "paused". He did not give a reason for this decision and noted the South African Army continues to need a mechanised capability. Work was underway at this time to assess options for extending the service life of the Army's Ratel vehicles.

== Design ==
The Badger uses a single turret developed by Denel that can be fitted with various weapons, The standard infantry carrier is armed with a 30 mm cannon and coaxial 7.62 mm machine gun.

The Badger has a crew of three, a commander, gunner and driver and can carry 8 troops. Troops enter and leave the vehicle via rear doors, there are also roof hatches for observation, firing and emergency exit.

The Badger is powered by a turbocharged Scania DI 12 540 hp engine and is fitted with a central tire inflation system and run-flat tires and has good mobility on rough terrain.

== Variants ==
There are six variants of the Badger, of which five are armed, namely the Section variant (30 mm), Fire support variant (30 mm), Mortar variant (60 mm), Command variant (12.7 mm) and Missile variant (Ingwe). The Ambulance variant is not armed.

=== Section variant ===
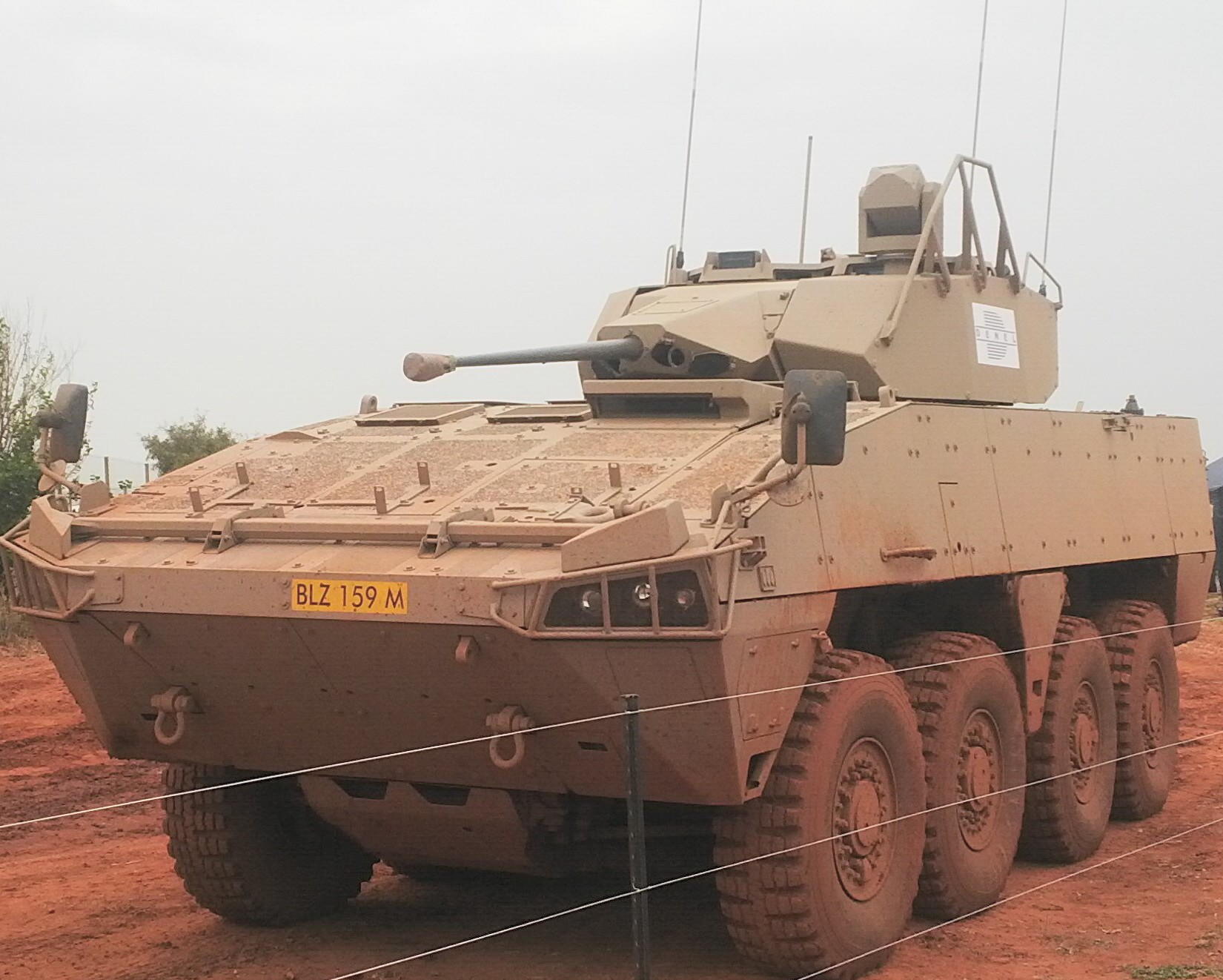
Badger IFV Section variant

The Section variant is armed with a Denel 30 mm dual-feed linkless Cam Gun (EMAK 30) which can engage targets up to 4000 metres when firing a single round at a time. Rapid-fire consists of 3-round bursts. The Section variant carries 400, 30 x 173mm rounds. The rear compartment of the Section variant has seating space for four passengers on the left and three passengers on the right.

=== Fire support variant ===
The Fire support variant carries the same main armament as the Section variant but has additional main armament ammunition which is kept in storage racks on the right-hand side of the passenger compartment. Seating in the passenger compartment is limited to two for use by a dedicated two man anti-tank team.

=== Mortar variant ===
The Mortar variant is equipped with a 60 mm DLS breech-loading, water-cooled mortar that can engage targets directly at 1500 metres in line of sight or 6200 metres indirectly. The mortar variant carries 256 x 60 mm shells and has a firing rate of 6 shells per minute (one every 10 seconds) and an accuracy of 2.4 m x 2.4 m at 1500 metres. The variant has four crew members, commander, gunner, driver, and technician.

=== Command variant ===
The Command variant is equipped with a primary 12.7 mm machine gun which allows more room for Command and Control (C&C) equipment and personnel. The command variant carries 1200 x 12.7 mm rounds. This variant has a standard crew of three (driver, vehicle commander, and gunner) and two to three communication staff in the rear.

=== Missile variant ===
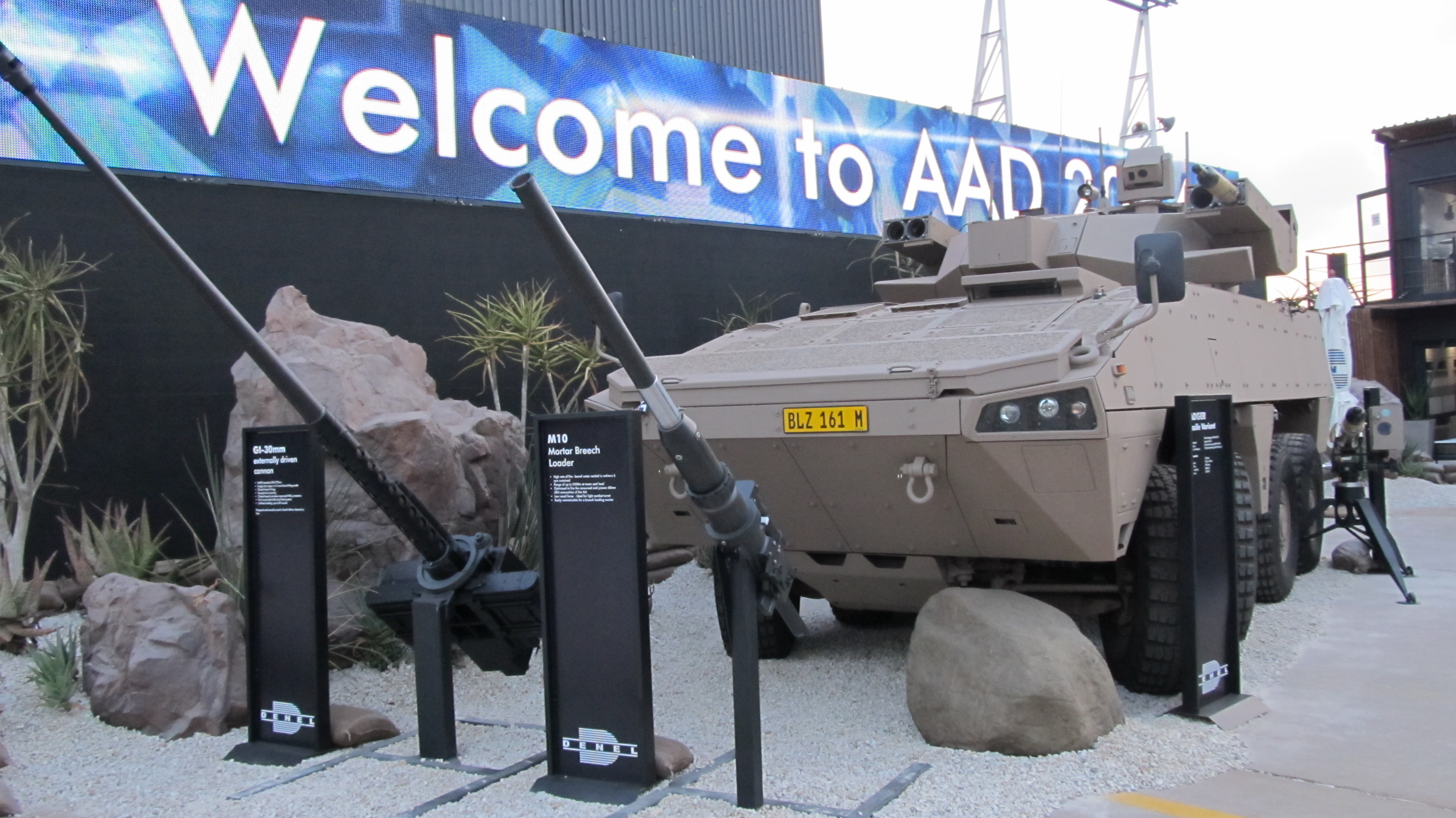
Badger IFV Missile variant

The Missile variant is equipped with a Denel Dynamics ZT3 Ingwe laser-guided, jam-resistant, beam-riding missile that has an effective engagement range of over 5,000 metres. The Ingwe has a tandem warhead that can defeat Explosive Reactive Armor (ERA) and can penetrate up to 1000 mm of RHA. A total of 12 missiles are carried in the rear compartment racks on either side of the hull. The Missile variant carries a driver, vehicle commander, gunner and loader.

=== Ambulance variant ===
The Ambulance variant is designed to be crewed by two medics and one driver. It has a taller hull superstructure and no turret, and features rails and a winch to mechanically assist patient movement. Maximum patient capacity is six: two litters and four seated, or three litters without seated patients.

== Operators ==
South Africa

- South African Army– 244 on order.

== See also ==
- Rooikat
- Ratel IFV
- RG41

=== Related development ===
- Patria AMV

=== Comparable vehicles ===
- VPK-7829 Bumerang – (Russia)
- Boxer AFV – (Germany, Netherlands)
- Stryker – (United States, Canada)
- Freccia IFV – (Italy)
- TATA Kestrel – (India)
- ZBL-08 – (China)*
- KTO Rosomak - (Poland)
- CM-32 armoured vehicle – (Taiwan)
