= Patria AMV =

Finnish wheeled armoured personnel carrier

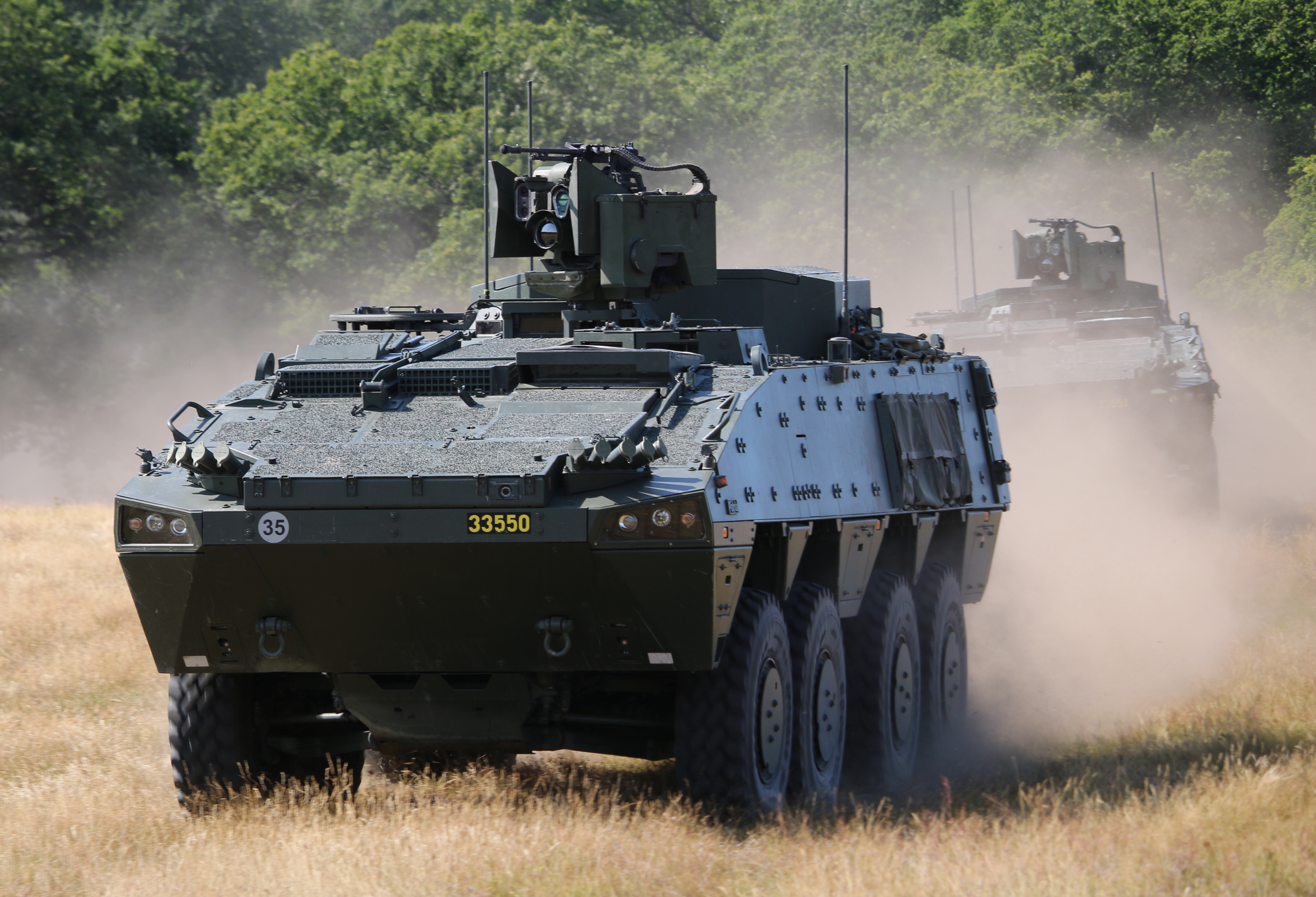
- A Swedish army Patria AMV
- Type: Armoured personnel carrier
- Place of origin: Finland

Service history
- In service: 2004–present
- Used by: See Operators below
- Wars: War in Afghanistan; Saudi Arabian-led intervention in Yemen; Russo-Ukrainian War

Production history
- Designer: Patria
- Manufacturer: Patria Under licence: Polish Armaments Group; As the KTO Rosomak; Japan Steel Works Ltd.; Denel Land Systems; As the Badger IFV; Đuro Đaković Grupa d.d.
- Produced: 2004–present

Specifications
- Mass: 16,000 to 32,000 kg (35,000 to 71,000 lb)
- Length: 7.7 m (25 ft)
- Width: 2.8 m (9 ft 2 in)
- Height: 2.3 m (7 ft 7 in)
- Crew: 2–3 (commander, driver, optional gunner); 8–12 passengers
- Main armament: Up to 105 mm gun or twin 120 mm mortars in turret
- Secondary armament: Protector RWS
- Engine: DI 12 Scania Diesel or DC 12 Scania Diesel or DC 13 Scania Diesel; 450 kW (600 hp) or 405 kW (543 hp) or 360 kW (480 hp)
- Power/weight: 14.1 kW/t (19.2 PS/t) (max weight), 28.1 kW/t (38.2 PS/t) (min weight)
- Suspension: 8×8 wheeled independent hydropneumatic suspension
- Operational range: 600–1,000 km (370–620 mi)
- Maximum speed: Over 100 km/h (60 mph) on land up to 10 km/h (6.2 mph) in water

The Patria AMV (Armoured Modular Vehicle) is an 8×8 multi-role military vehicle produced by the Finnish defence industry company Patria.

The main feature of the AMV is its modular design, which allows the incorporation of different turrets, weapons, sensors, or communications systems on the same carriage. Designs exist for different APC (armoured personnel carrier) vehicles and IFV (infantry fighting vehicle) versions, communications versions, ambulances and different fire-support versions, armed with large-caliber mortar and gun systems.

The vehicle has a high level of mine protection and can remain unaffected from most anti-personnel and anti-tank landmines. It can withstand explosions of up to 10 kilograms (22 lb) TNT. The AMV has protection levels up to 30 mm APFSDS frontal arc. Another important feature is the very good mobility, combining speed, agility, and crew comfort in rough terrain, enabled by the sophisticated but rugged hydropneumatic suspension that can adjust each wheel individually.

== History ==
The AMV stems from a 1995 investigation by the Finnish Army HQ into different armoured vehicle concepts. In 1996, Patria Vehicles began to develop different concept vehicles and found the 8×8 one to be most suitable as a replacement for the 6×6 Sisu Pasi. The Finnish Defence Forces (FDF) ordered a concept study in 1999, which was ready by 2000. Patria continued to develop the vehicle and the first AMV prototype was ready for testing in November 2001. Two evaluation samples were ordered by the FDF in December 2001 and were delivered in 2003.

Later in 2003, the FDF ordered 24 AMOS-equipped Patria AMVs for delivery 2006–09. The FDF also said that they were looking to order some 100 units, equipped with remote-controlled weapon stations, later placing an order for 62. In December 2002, the Polish Defence Ministry placed an order for 690 vehicles, making Patria the leading manufacturer of IFV in the 15–27 tonne range in Europe. Subsequent deals were made all over Europe, as well as in South Africa and the United Arab Emirates—in many places being locally produced. In 2004, the AMV became the first 4th generation combat vehicle of its kind to enter serial production.

The design was based on experience gained from building the Pasi and on customer feedback on that vehicle. It was entirely designed in 3D virtual environments before construction, and successful testing of the prototype showed that it fulfilled all expectations.

The vehicle was initially designed in 6×6, 8×8 and 10×10 variants, but the 10×10 variant was later dropped.

== Variants ==
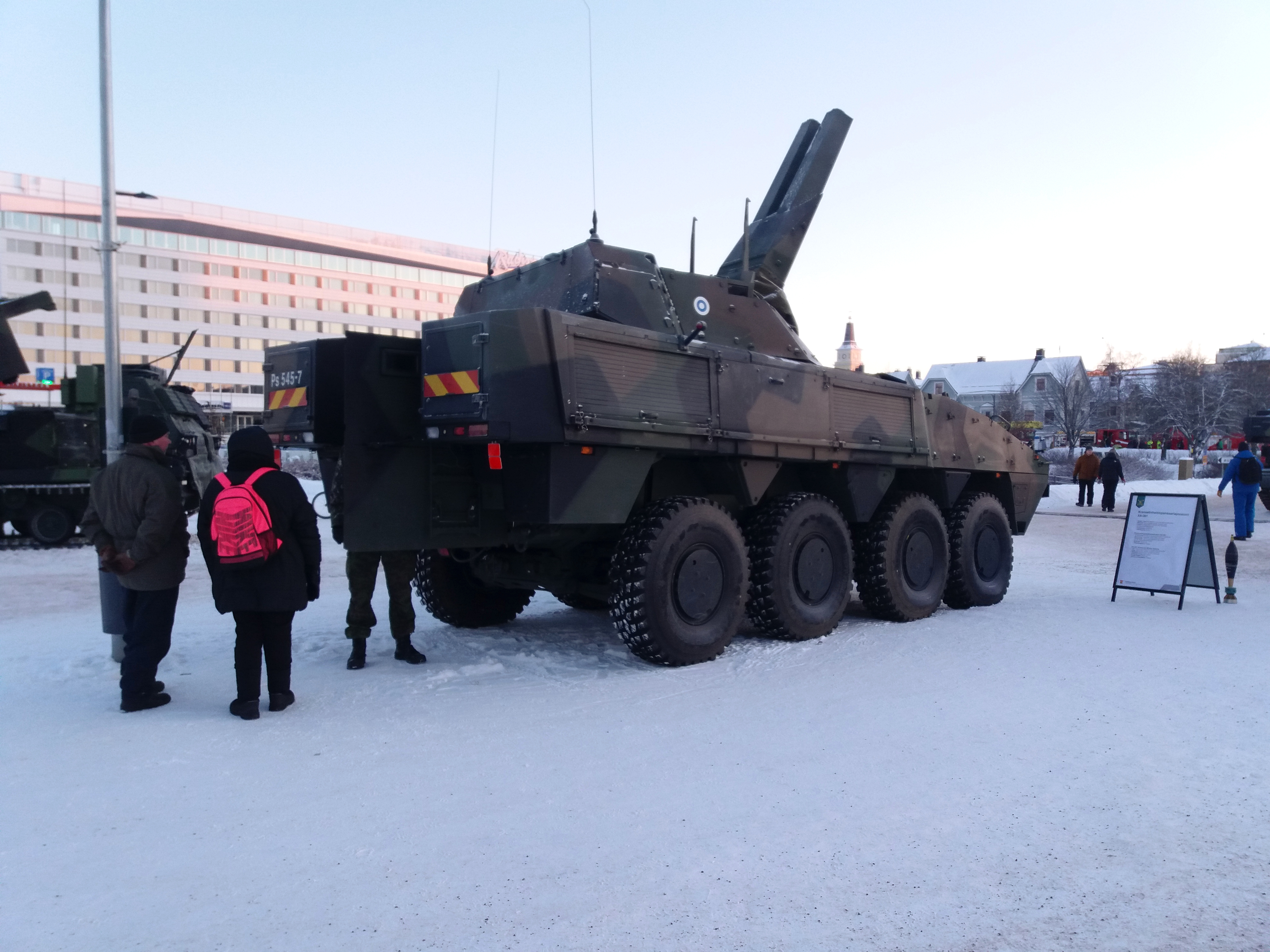
Patria AMV XA-361 mortar carrier operated by the Finnish Defence Forces

=== Patria AMV (first version) ===
The AMV is offered in three main variants: a basic platform, a high roof platform and a heavy weapon platform.

- The AMV basic platform includes APC, IFV, C2, ambulance, reconnaissance, mortar carrier, FCV, ATGM and MGS vehicles. The basic platform can also be provided as an extended Basic L platform with increased internal volume.
- The AMV high roof platform features a larger and higher rear compartment, which allows more space-requiring work to be done inside the vehicle. The AMV SP is suitable for C3, large ambulance and workshop vehicles.
- The AMV heavy weapon platform features a stronger structure, enabling the fitting of heavy weapon systems e.g. Patria AMOS 120 mm mortar turret or Mobile Gun System.

=== Patria AMV^{XP} ===
In 2013 Patria launched a new upgraded version of AMV. In June 2014 Patria announced the name of its next generation 8×8 armoured vehicles, Patria AMV^{XP}, which stands for Extra Payload, Extra Performance and Extra Protection.

=== Lockheed Patria Havoc AMV (United States) ===
Patria and Lockheed Martin agreed to cooperate in the competition for the US Marines MPC (Marine Personnel Carrier) program that was set to replace the LAV-25. The USMC planned to obtain 600 MPC vehicles. Patria was to deliver the AMV 8×8 vehicle. Lockheed Martin Systems Integration was responsible for the MPC offer, as well as system integration, survivability systems, the US production line, and networking and logistics. In August 2012, the Marines gave Lockheed a developmental contract for their vehicle, called the Havoc.

For protection against mine attacks, the Havoc would have used a subframe rather than a V-hull. In April 2013, the Havoc successfully completed amphibious testing as part of its evaluation for the MPC program.

The Marine Personnel Carrier was put on hold in June 2013, restarted in February 2014, and then restructured as Phase 1 of the Amphibious Combat Vehicle (ACV) program, which included the previous MPC competitor entries.

During the summer of 2013, the Havoc successfully completed protection systems testing during a series of blast tests. The vehicle completed all threshold and objective protection system testing, with instrumentation indicating that no disabling injuries would have resulted to any of the three crew members and nine dismounted Marines. Lockheed delivered a report demonstrating the high degree of commonality between the Havoc and other Marine Corps vehicles, aimed at reducing cost, training requirements, and logistics needs.

The Lockheed Havoc AMV completed the Nevada Automotive Test Center's Butte Mountain Trail course in September 2014. Lockheed planned to offer the Havoc in the Marine Corps' ACV Phase 1 program, and give them 16 vehicles to test once a Request for Proposals (RFP) was released in early 2015. In July 2015 partnership between Patria and Lockheed Martin came to an end, and Havoc was not offered to the Amphibious Combat Vehicle program.

=== Other variants ===
- The Slovenian variant "SKOV Svarun 8×8" uses a specially designed hydraulic door. The new door features additional carrying space for ammunition, two RPG-type anti-tank weapons and a general purpose machinegun. Another Slovenian variant "Patria Mangart 25 RCT" is a modification of SKOV Svarun by adding a Mangart 25mm autocannon turret (RCT = Remote Controlled Turret) developed by Slovenian company Valhalla.
- The South African "Badger" variant, equipped with an underfloor armour package from Land Mobility Technologies (LMT) and Denel Land Systems's Modular Combat Turret (MCT). Offered in Section, Fire Support, Mortar, Command and Missile sub-variants. Due to various factors, e.g. mismanagement of the project and involvement by the Guptas brothers and associates, it is yet to enter South African service.
- Slovak variant "BOV 8×8 VYDRA" it is armed with a 30mm GTS 30 cannon mounted in a TURRA 30 with fire control system and ammunition containers.
- The UAE variant is slightly lengthened (0.4 m longer) to allow fitting of the more spacious BMP-3 turret and the same number of soldiers as the original AMV model.
- BAE partnered with Patria to offer the "AMV35", a version of the AMV with an E35 turret from the CV9035 to create a combat reconnaissance vehicle for the Australian Army's Land 400 Phase 2 mounted combat reconnaissance requirement.
- Patria made an AMV featuring the CMI Defense CT-CV 105HP turret. The turret features an autoloader, laser warning system, and capabilities for a barrel launched guided missile.

== Service ==
=== Polish service ===
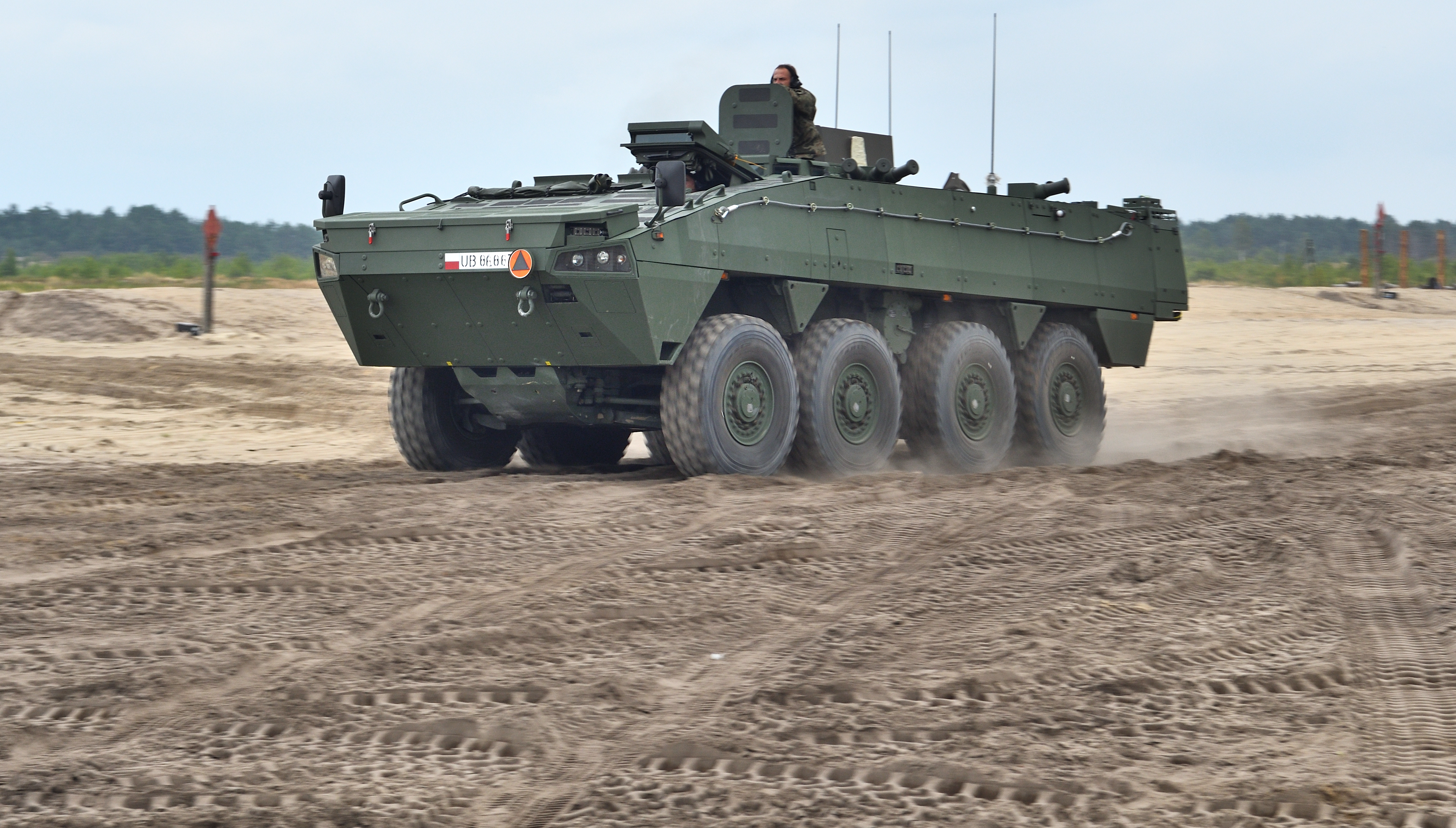
KTO Rosomak of the Polish Land Forces

The Polish Army has ordered 690 vehicles in 2003, including 313 AMVs with the Italian Oto Melara 30 mm Hitfist-30P turret and 377 AMVs in "base" configuration to by converted in Poland to other various configurations be delivered between 2004 and 2013. Some of the Polish vehicles were deployed in Afghanistan. The Polish vehicles are known as KTO Rosomak ("wolverine") in Polish Army service. In 2013 the Polish army ordered 307 more vehicles, including 122 AMVs and 80 mortars, totaling 997 units making Poland the largest operator by a fair margin. The Vehicles are built in Poland under licence. In 2017 Polish Ministry of Defence said that production of KTO Rosomak is now 100% based in Poland.

=== Finnish service ===
The Finnish Army has ordered 24 AMVs fitted with the AMOS mortar system and 62 AMVs fitted with Protector (RWS) remote weapon system for the 12.7 mm M2HB QCB heavy machine gun or the GMG grenade machine gun. The standard version is known as XA-360 in Finnish Army service, while the AMOS version is known as XA-361.

=== Slovenian service ===
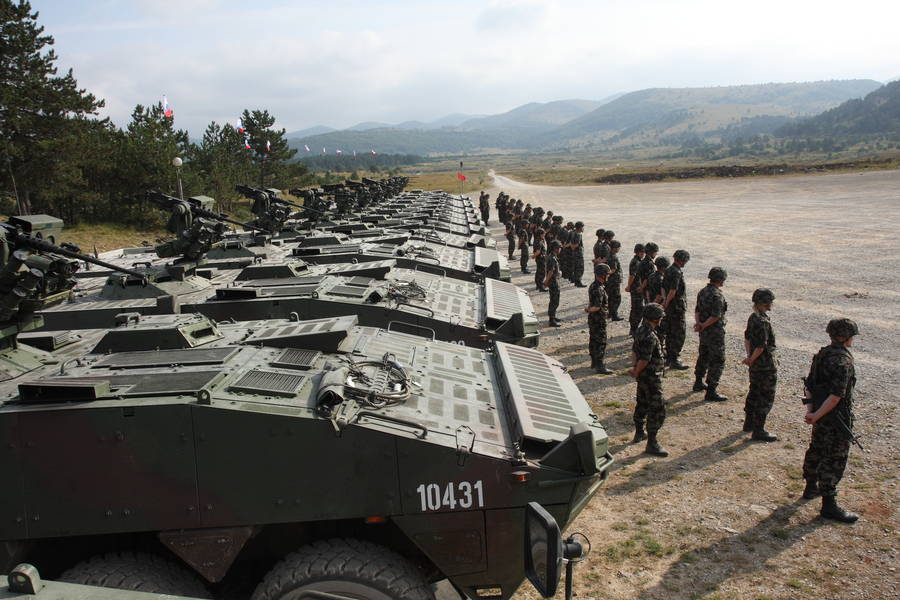
Slovenian AMVs

In June 2006, the Slovenian Ministry of Defence declared that the Patria AMV would be the new armoured fighting vehicle of the Slovenian Armed Forces. Patria will supply 100 vehicles, some equipped with the NEMO mortar, some with Elbit 30 mm remote controlled weapon station and the rest with Kongsberg Protector turrets. Allegations in the Finnish media that Patria used bribery to secure the Slovenian contract led to a scandal and a criminal investigation in Finland and may have contributed to the defeat of Prime Minister Janez Janša in the 2008 Slovenian parliamentary elections. Due to the 2008 financial crisis, the defence budget was cut several times. At first, the contract to supply 135 vehicles should have been amended to have less vehicles with better armament. Later on, the defence ministry suffered from even bigger financial cuts. In 2012, the Defence Minister announced the termination of the contract, by which time 30 vehicles had been received.

In 2024 Slovenia announced it would be purchasing more vehicles after an competition against several contenders.

=== South African service ===
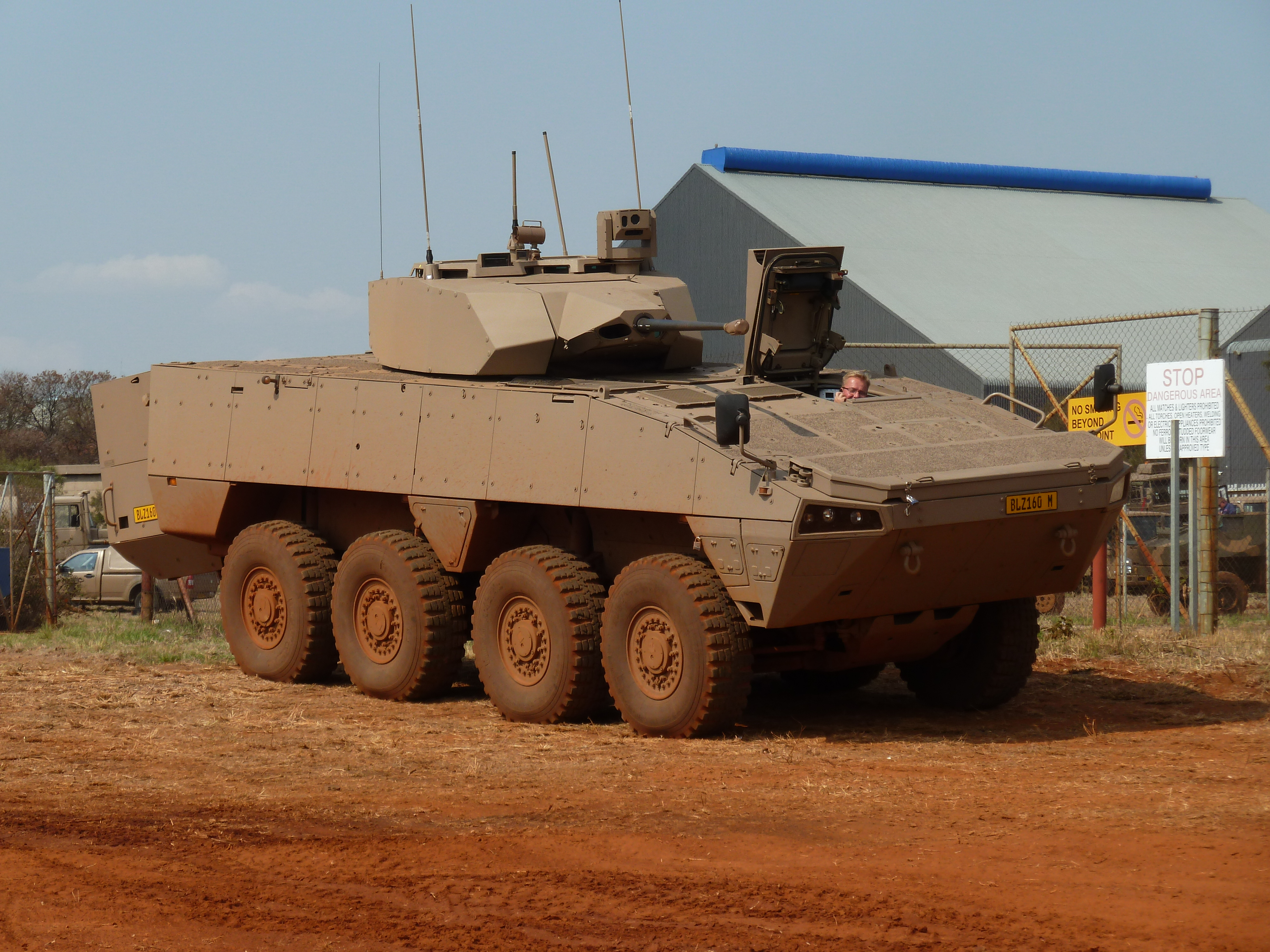
A South African Badger with a DLS MCT-30 turret

In May 2007, the South African Denel Land Systems was awarded a contract to build an improved version of the AMV, with a high level of ballistic and mine protection for the South African National Defence Force (SANDF). The AMV will replace South-African Ratels as part of the "Project Hoefyster" (Horseshoe). Five different versions are included: Command, Mortar, Missile, Section and Fire Support vehicles. In November 2013, Denel Land Systems and Patria announced an agreement regarding Patria AMV 8×8 armoured wheeled vehicle serial production and delivery to South Africa. The agreement includes 238 vehicles, with 5 pre-series vehicles delivered during the development phase. In 2023, the SANDF was still in possession of 4 of the 5 original pre-production vehicles, but had not actually accepted them into service. The remainder of the order remained unfilled due to Denel's financial difficulties.

=== Croatian service ===
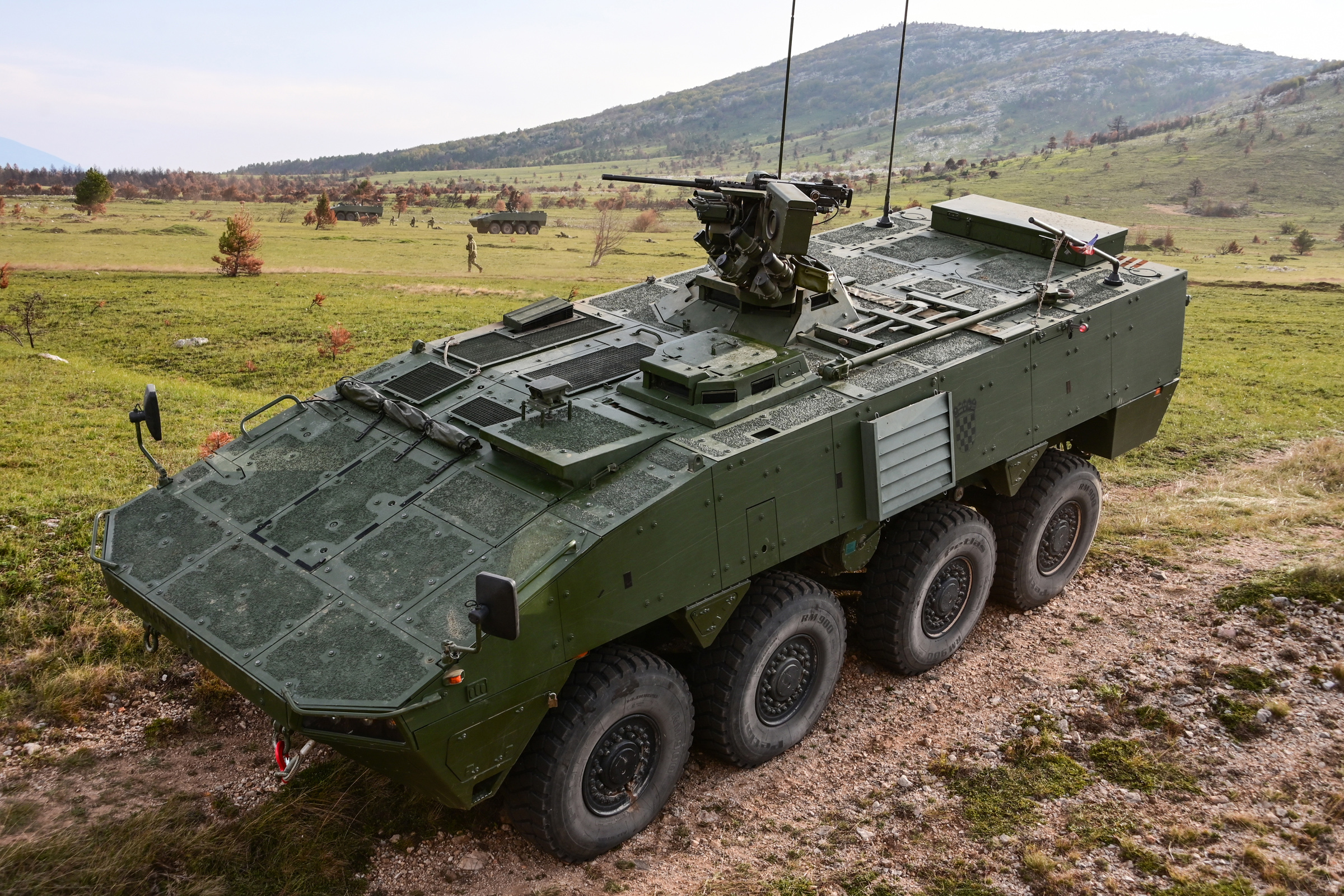
Patria CRO of the Croatian Army equipped with Kongsberg Protector M151

In July 2007, the Croatian Ministry of Defence selected the Patria AMV as the new armoured fighting vehicle of the Armed Forces of the Republic of Croatia in their first international tender in its history. 84 AMVs will be supplied. Initially, the plan called for 84 8×8 vehicles and 42 6×6 vehicles. The Croatian Ministry of Defence has approved the purchase of 84 Patria AMV 8×8 vehicles. The 6×6 configuration idea was scrapped, and the remaining 42 vehicles were decided to be 8×8s. The purchase of the remaining 42 AMVs was made in December 2008. Due to the 2008 financial crisis, the contract was slightly amended in April 2010. There was an initial plan of shelving the order by a half, 64 vehicles were mentioned, but it was decided that the total of 126 units would remain on order. In order to somewhat decrease the cost of the deal, the most expensive variants like the NEMO or engineering units will probably be replaced by less costly APC variants. On the other hand, the production will be sped up and all vehicles are to be delivered by the end of 2012.

=== North Macedonian service ===
The government of the Republic of North Macedonia announced in 2006 that it would procure the same type that the Croatian military chooses after test trials in 2007—as this would be a less expensive than conducting trials of their own. The configuration of Patria vehicles that eventually win the competition will be similar to those in Slovenian service, but probably in smaller numbers. Any contract has not been published.

=== UAE service ===
In January 2008, Patria announced that the United Arab Emirates armed forces had ordered the AMV, equipped with the BMP-3 turret. The number of vehicles is yet to be announced.

=== Czech service ===
In January 2008, Patria offered to deliver 30 AMVs within four months of ordering, if the Czech Army chose the AMV as its next APC. The Czech army had earlier chosen the Austrian Steyr Pandur as their next APC, but the Czech government withdrew from the deal at the end of last year, citing Steyr's failure to fulfil the commitments ensuing from the contract.

In May 2026, Patria signed three Memoranda of Understanding (MoUs) with Czech state-owned defence enterprises to bolster its bid for the Czech Armed Forces' major 8×8 wheeled armoured vehicle procurement. The agreement positions Patria's localised AMV XP 8×8 CZ platform as a replacement for the country's ageing fleet of Pandur II vehicles.

=== Swedish service ===
In August 2010, Patria sold 113 AMVs to Sweden in a deal worth 250 million Euros. The deal included an option for another 113 vehicles in the future.

== Combat history ==
War in Afghanistan (2001–2021)

The Polish Land Forces contingent, which was a part of the International Security Assistance Force, operated 35 (later raised to 128) KTO Rosomak vehicles (including 5 medevac) in Afghanistan since 2007. The APCs were equipped with additional steel-composite armour. In early 2008, a Polish Rosomak serving in Afghanistan (the version with upgraded armour) was attacked by Taliban rebels. The vehicle was hit with RPG-7 rockets but it managed to fire back and returned to base without any help required. In June 2008, a Rosomak was attacked by Taliban and was hit in its frontal armour with an RPG which did not penetrate the armour. In 2009, the first soldier was reported killed while traveling in a Rosomak after an IED exploded under the vehicle causing it to roll over and crushing the gunner who had been standing in the open turret. Similar explosions caused by mines and IEDs have occurred before though they have failed to inflict casualties.

- In October 2010, a platoon of Svarun vehicles was sent to Afghanistan to support the Slovenian OMLT.

European Union mission in Chad (2008–2009)
European Union Force Chad/CAR used 16 KTO Rosomak (including 2 medevac).

Saudi Arabia and United Arab Emirates-led intervention in Yemen (2015–present)
United Arab Emirates Army used 8×8 Patria AMVs fitted with remotely operated turrets in an offensive along the west coast of Yemen.

Russo-Ukrainian War

The Polish-made Patria AMVs have been used by the Armed Forces of Ukraine during the Russian invasion of Ukraine since autumn 2023. On 24 September 2024, three vehicles were lost during failed attack by the Ukrainian Armed Forces near Andriivka.

== Operators ==
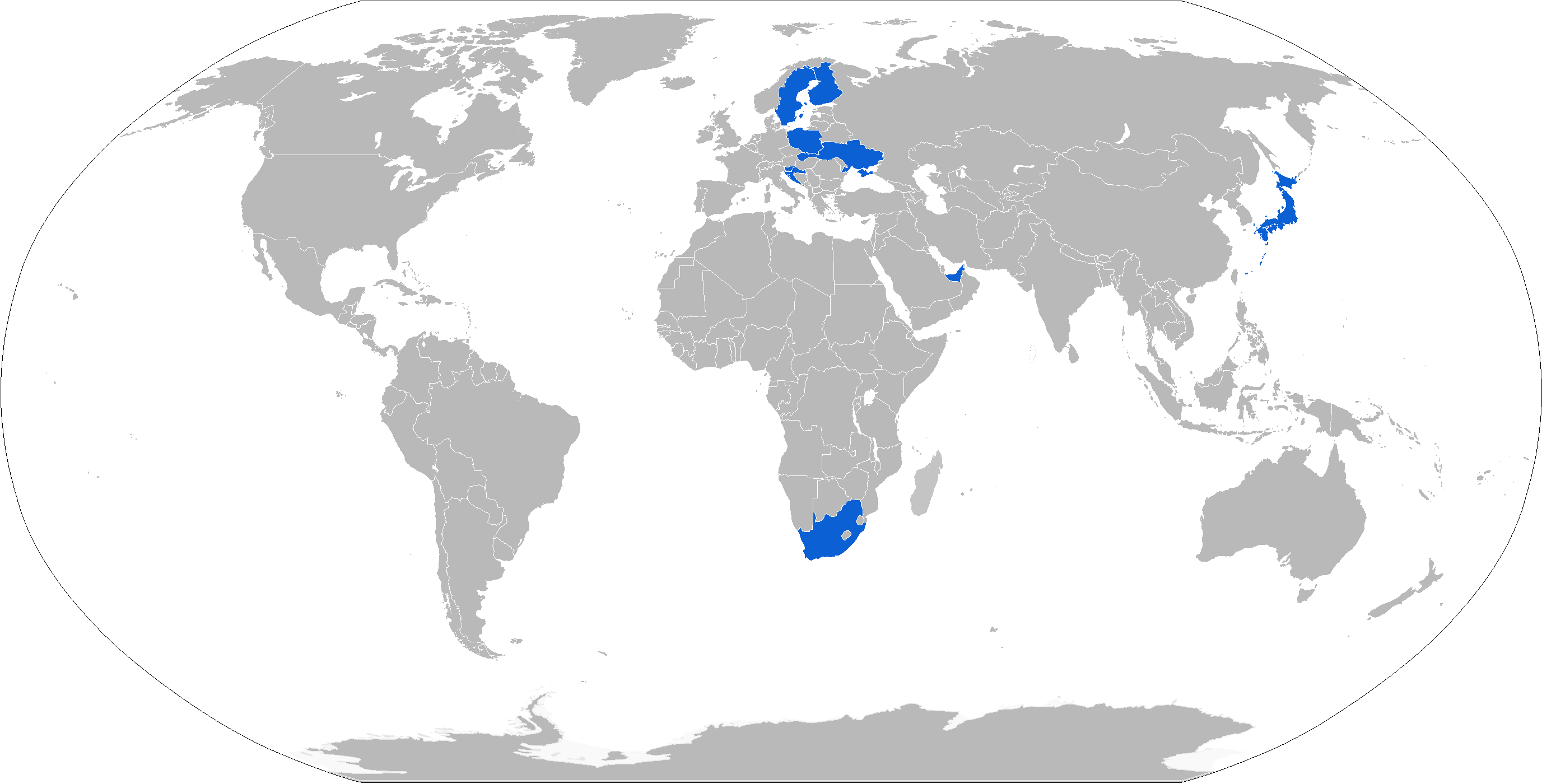
A map of Patria AMV operators in blue

=== Current operators ===
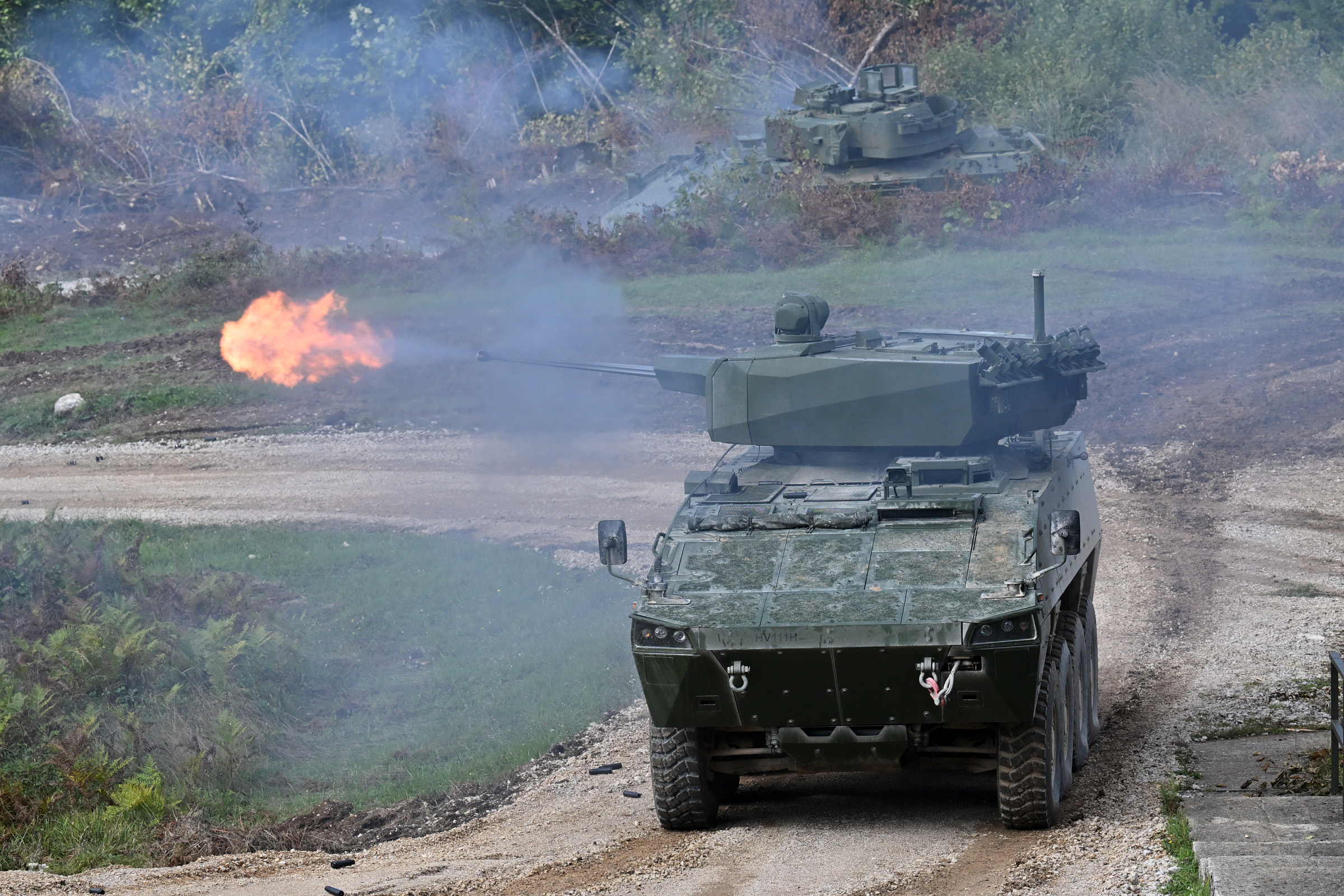
A Patria CRO equipped with UT30 Mk2 turret of the Croatian Army

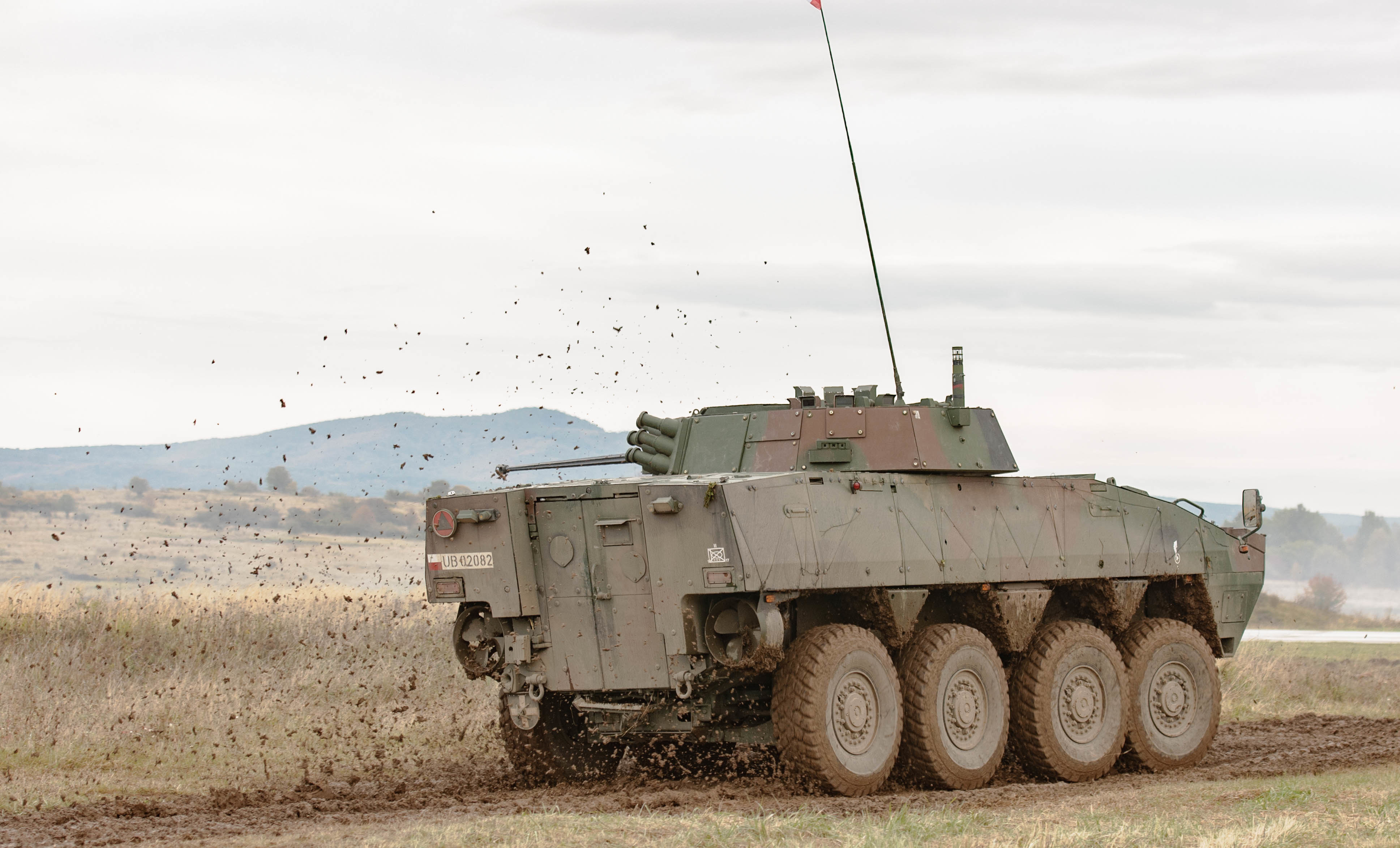
A Polish KTO Rosomak IFV with a Hitfist-30P turret

Croatia (126 in service, 30 on order)
Orders:
- 84 Patria AMV ordered in 2007 in 3 variants (BOV an APC, BOV-Sn an ambulance, BOV-Log a logistics variant) manufactured in Croatia.
- 42 Patria AMV ordered in December 2008 in 3 variants (BOV an APC, BOV-Sn an ambulance, BOV-Log a logistics variant) manufactured in Croatia.
- 30 Patria AMV IFV ordered in March 2023, to be equipped with Elbit UT30MK2 turrets outfitted with Spike LR missiles for €158 million, to be delivered by 2028.
Options:
- 12 additional Patria AMV IFV are expected to fill the Medium Brigade requirements.
Finland (80)
62 standard APCs equipped with Kongsberg turrets and 18 armoured wheeled mortar carriers equipped with the AMOS mortar system.
Poland (1197)
1,197 APCs and amphibious AFVs. Manufactured under license at Rosomak S.A, marked as KTO Rosomak (Kołowy Transporter Opancerzony Rosomak, transl. wheeled armoured personnel carrier "Wolverine"). All of the ordered vehicles were delivered by 2019. In 2013 the original order for 359 IFVs and 331 base vehicles was increased by 307 units—including 122 IFVs with new turret. In 2013 there were a total of 570 vehicles in service In January 2015, the Polish army placed an order for 200 additional vehicles. This brought the total number of vehicles in operation up to 977.
Slovakia (76)
In March 2022 the Slovakian Ministry of Defence selected Finland and Patria AMVxp 8×8 as BOV 8×8 programme tender winner. 76 vehicles, new version of Patria AMV^{XP} ordered and being delivered . They were first delivered in early 2026 and are being utilized into the existing units and they are going to replace BVP-1 and BVP-2 along with the CV9035 MK.IV.
Slovenia (30 in service, 106 on order)
Two orders:
- 2006-2012 order: 30 Patria AMV vehicles (local designation SKOV Svarun 8×8) that had already been delivered (full delivery of original order did not happen due to economic and legal questions). Some later modified into Patria Mangart 25 RCT variant by adding a Slovenian 25mm cannon turret.
- 2024 order: On 11 July 2024, Slovenian Prime Minister Robert Golob announced that Slovenia will buy 106 Patria AMV^{XP} vehicles after a competition between four contenders. The vehicles will be used to create a medium battalion battle group and later a scout battalion.
Sweden (113)
Sweden made an order for 113 vehicles, and had an option for the same number of vehicles, but a Swedish court ordered the competition to be re-done. In August 2010 the new competition ended in the same result as the original competition with Sweden ordering 113 vehicles from Patria. The first vehicles were delivered in March 2013.
United Arab Emirates (55)
The United Arab Emirates Army ordered an initial evaluation batch of 15 vehicles. These vehicles will be equipped with BMP-3 turrets and have therefore been slightly modified, including a somewhat longer hull. In January 2016, the General Headquarters of the UAE armed forces ordered 40 Patria AMV hulls with the option of 50 more. The vehicles were shipped in June 2016 from Patria's Polish production line. The Patrias are used in Yemen in combat operations.

=== Future operators ===
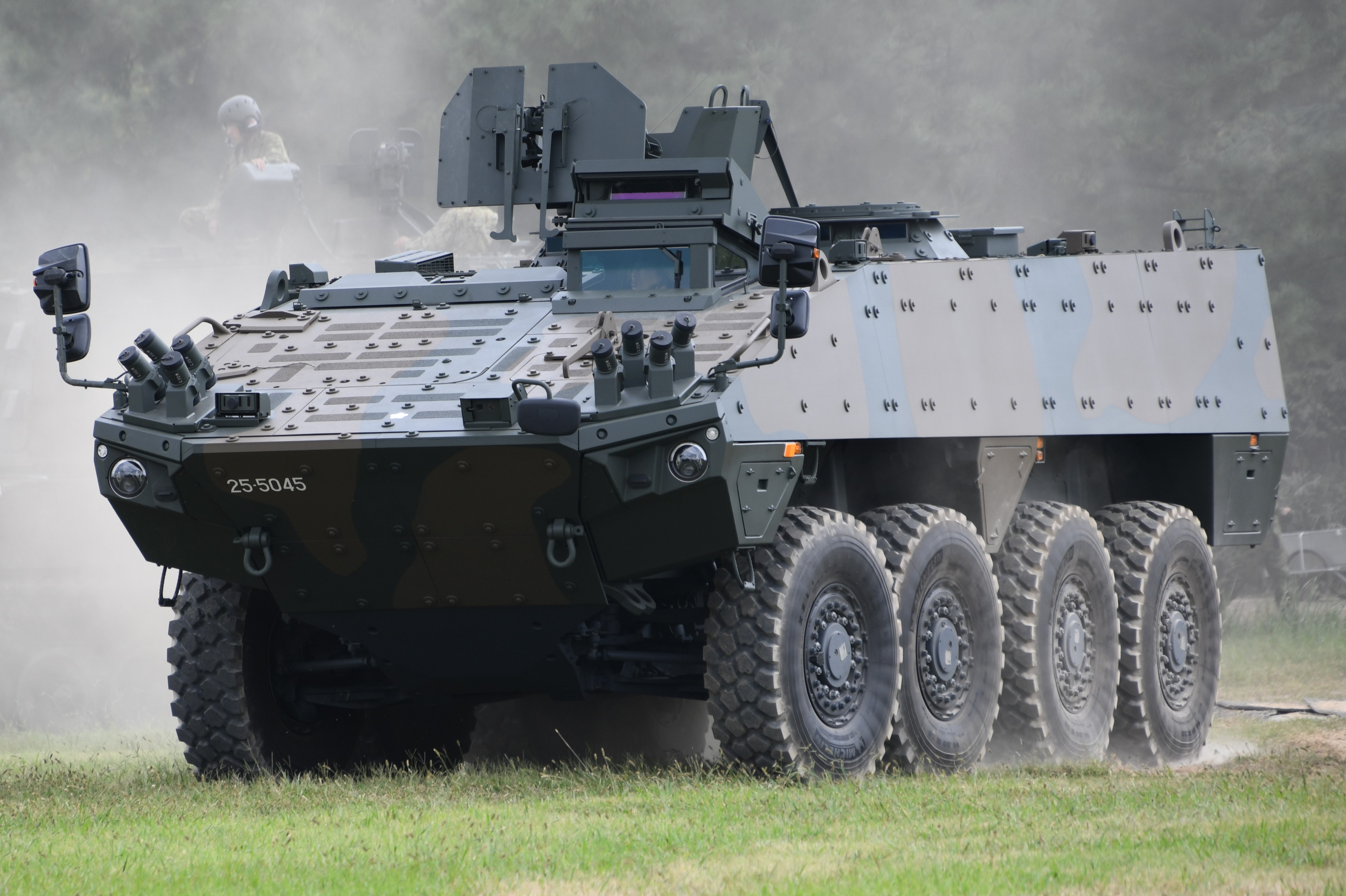
JGSDF AMV

Japan (105 ordered, 810 planned in total)
It was reported in December 2020, that two Patria AMV^{XP} 8×8 vehicles are being sent to Japan from Finland for field tests to participate in the Next Wheeled Armoured Vehicle project under the Japanese Ministry of Defense. In December 2021, the MOD started field tests to ascertain the vehicle and an unnamed armoured vehicle made by Mitsubishi Heavy Industries. In December 2022, the Japanese Ministry of Defense awarded a contract for the AMV through Patria Japan. A first batch of 140 is expected. 140 engines were ordered by Japan from Scania for this vehicle. In August 2023, Patria and Japan Steel Works Ltd. (JSW) signed a license agreement on manufacturing for vehicles in Japan. The agreement enables local production in accordance with Japan Ground Self-Defense Force's Wheeled Armoured Personnel Carrier (WAPC) programme. The final number of vehicles is unknown as of 2024. The first Patria AMV was delivered to the Japan Ground Self-Defense Force (JGSDF) in September 2025. A handover ceremony was held on September 2, 2025.
Orders:
- 23 vehicles with the 2026 budget (¥ 17.1 billion)
- 28 vehicles with the 2025 budget (¥ 22.5 billion)
- 28 vehicles with the 2024 budget (¥ 20.0 billion)
- 26 vehicles with the 2023 budget (¥ 13.6 billion)
Current Units (as 2026)

Japan Ground Self-Defense Force Fuji School

- Infantry Department

- JGSDF Fuji School (Combined Training) Brigade
  - JGSDF Infantry School Regiment (Mechanized) - 1st Infantry Company (elements) and 4th Infantry Company

JGSDF Logistics Support School

- JGSDF Ordnance School
  - Department of Education No. 2 - Educational Materials

Ground Component Command

- Central Readiness Regiment

Northern Army (Japan)

- 2nd Division (Japan)
  - JGSDF 3rd Rapid Deployment Regiment

Western Army (Japan)

- 8th Division (Japan)
  - JGSDF 42nd Rapid Deployment Regiment
Ukraine (200)
In April 2023, Ukraine ordered 100 vehicles from the Polish production line. The vehicles will be paid by funds allocated by the EU and USA.
Later, in an interview, president Zelensky said that there would be 200 vehicles, 100 now, 100 later. The deal would include mortar carriers.

=== Potential clients ===
Czech Republic
The Czech Republic is looking for a successor to its Pandur II, the Patria AMV^{XP} is a potential successor as of May 2026.
South Africa (238)
The status of the project is unclear as of December 2025.
Background:
- 238 units expected as of 2007, locally known as the Badger.
- Five versions planned: a standard infantry carrier, a command car, fire support variant, mortar carrier and tank hunter.
- Production:
  - Patria and Denel collaborated on the project, with the aim to produce it locally under licence. The production was scheduled to commence in 2012, but this was delayed to 2017 and subsequently to 2023 due to the company's financial difficulties.
  - As of November 2023, no production Badgers had been delivered. The South African army was in possession of 4 pre-production models supplied by Denel for trials purposes, but these were not formally accepted into service.

=== Failed bids ===
Australia
BAE Systems Australia and Land 400 bid partner Patria were confirmed as one of two tenders selected to take part in the 12-month Risk Mitigation Activity for the Australian Army's Land 400 Phase 2 combat reconnaissance vehicle program. The other tender was the German-Dutch BOXER IFV. The German BOXER was announced as the winner in March 2018.
Bulgaria
The Patria AMV and more recently (as of 2017) Patria AMV^{XP} is a strong contender for the order in the new Bulgarian project for a new type of wheeled IFV. The project initially called for a total of 238 vehicles in different variants (of them 100 in combat variant, the rest in combat support (reconnaissance, combat engineer etc.) and combat service support variants (MedEvac etc.)). In the end of 2016 the Bulgarian Ministry of Defence re-examined the conditions and out of budget considerations reduced the number of combat vehicles to 90. The requirement that the combat, CS and CSS variants should be of one standard platform was dropped. The new baseline of the project calls for 90 combat vehicles and 108 supporting vehicles for a total cost of 1.22 billion BGN or about €600 million. RfI-letters have been sent to General Dynamics Land Systems – MOWAG (for the Piranha V and the Pandur II), Nexter Systems (for the VBCI), Patria Oy (for the Patria AMV and Patria AMV^{XP}, both have been demonstrated in the country), Rheinmetall Defence AG (for the Boxer), Textron (a joint offer together with Rheinmetall Defence AG for the Boxer in the combat role and Commando Select assembled in Bulgaria in the combat support and combat service support roles. Textron offered its own 6×6 prototype in the combat role, but due to its still unproven status it is considered the weakest alternative), Iveco-Leonardo Defence System (for the B1 Centauro in the updated 120mm B2 version) and Krauss Maffei Wegman GmbH (also for the Boxer). In the beginning of 2017 the defence minister in the Gerdzhikov caretaker government decided, that RfI-letters should be sent to 7 additional companies. Only Otokar (for the Arma), FNSS (for the Pars) and WMZ (for the KTO Rosomak) were credible contenders. The forerunners in the competition at the end of 2017 were the Piranha V, the Patria AMV^{XP} and the Otokar Arma. Patria Group has expressed willingness to involve Bulgarian defence sector companies as subcontractors in the production not only of eventual Bulgarian vehicles, but also for export markets.
An offer made by General Dynamics Land Systems for a cheaper Stryker won the competition and was approved by the parliament in September 2023, 183 vehicles for USD $1.37 billion.
Czech Republic (199)
The Pandur II 8×8 was selected in 2006, and it was in competition against the Patria AMV.
Portugal (260 planned, 188 produced)
The Pandur II 8×8 was selected in 2005 and it was in competition against the Piranha IIIC and the Patria AMV
Spain
In 2015, a program to replace the VEC-M1, the BMR-M1 and part of the M113 fleet was launched by the Spanish Army. The competitors were the Boxer, the Freccia, the Patria AMV, the Piranha V, the SEP and the VBCI.
In September 2015, the competition was won by GDELS with the Piranha V. In December 2019, the Spanish Government cancelled the program, and relaunched the competition. In August 2020, the Piranha V of GDELS Santa Barbara Sistemas in collaboration with Indra Sistemas and Sapa Placencia again won the competition for a first batch of 348 vehicles for €1.74 billion. It is known as the Dragon VCR.

=== Evaluation-only operators ===
Chile (> 200)
The Chilean Army was looking for a successor to its 160 Piraña I 6×6 and 30 Piraña I 8×8. On a long term perspective, more than 200 vehicles are expected to be purchased, but in the meantime, a first phase of the replacement includes a tender for 82 8×8 armoured vehicles. The requirement mentions a maximum weight of 38 tons. The deadline for the selection is dated April 8, 2025. Among the known competitors were:

- Altuğ by the Turkish BMC
- AMV by the Finnish Patria Group
- Arma by the Turkish Otokar
- Freccia by the Italian Iveco
- K808 White Tiger by the South Korean Hyundai Rotem
- Pandur II 8×8 by the Czech Excalibur Army
- Stryker 8×8 by the United States US army (the only offer for already used units)
- Terrex ICV by the Singapore ST Engineering

United States
The Patria AMV partook in the Amphibious Combat Vehicle trials in the US. Lockheed Martin partnered with Patria offering the AMV under the name Havoc, but ended cooperation with Patria and offered a different vehicle for the program in July 2015. In 2016, LM introduced a new ACV armored vehicle.

== Museum exhibits ==
- Parola Tank Museum, Hattula, 1 APC variant with Kongsberg turret and 1 AMOS mock-up

== See also ==
- Patria 6x6
- Patria NEMO
- Patria AMOS

Comparable modern 8×8 APC:

- Boxer – (Germany, Netherlands)
- VBCI – (France)
- Pandur II – (Austria) (amphibious)
- Piranha V – (Switzerland)
- Iveco SuperAV – (Italy)
  - ACV – (United States)
- LAV 6 – (Canada)
- Eitan AFV – (Israel)
- Terrex ICV – (Singapore)
- CM-32 – (Taiwan)
- Type 08 – (China) (amphibious)
- Type 96 – (Japan)
- K808 White Tiger – (South Korea) (amphibious)
- VPK-7829 Bumerang – (Russia) (amphibious)
