= KTO Rosomak =

Polish 8×8 multi-role military vehicle

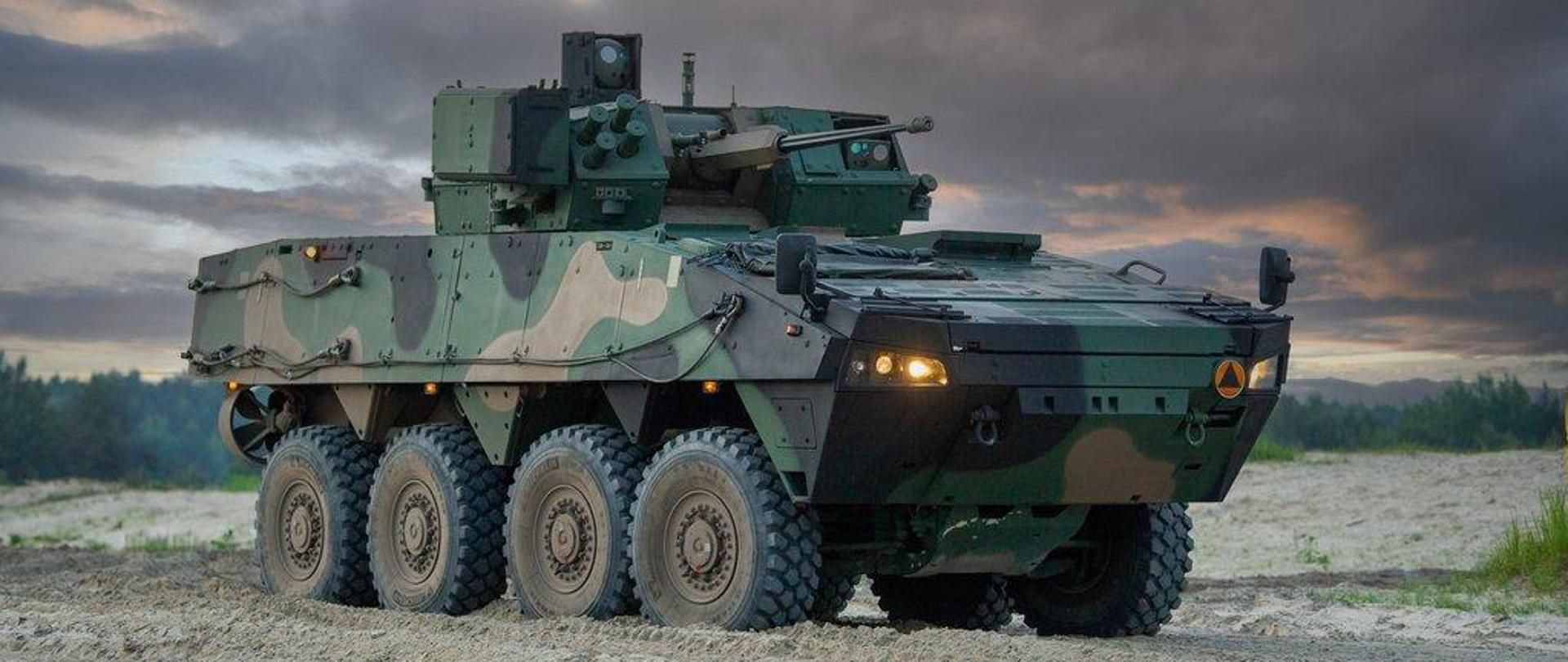
- KTO Rosomak in an IFV variant with a ZSSW-30 turret system
- Type: armored personnel carrier
- Place of origin: Finland / Poland

Service history
- Used by: See Operators
- Wars: War in Afghanistan (2001–2021); Russo-Ukrainian War

Specifications
- Mass: 22,000 kg (49,000 lb)
- Length: 7.7 m (25 ft)
- Width: 2.8 m (9 ft 2 in)
- Height: 2.3 m (7 ft 7 in)
- Crew: 3 (commander, driver, gunner); 6–8 dismounts
- Main armament: 1 × 30×173 mm ATK Mk44 Bushmaster II gun 2 x ATGM Spike-LR or Javelin (only on ZSSW-30 variant)
- Secondary armament: 1 × 7.62×51mm NATO UKM-2000C coaxial general purpose machine gun
- Engine: Scania DI 12 diesel or Scania DC 13 diesel 405 kW (543 hp) (DI 12) or 450 kW (600 hp) (DC 13)
- Power/weight: 15.6 kW/t (21.2 PS/t) (max weight)
- Suspension: 8×8 wheeled
- Operational range: 800 km (500 mi)
- Maximum speed: over 100 km/h (60 mph) on land up to 10 km/h (6.2 mph) in water

The KTO Rosomak (Polish: Kołowy Transporter Opancerzony Rosomak, lit. 'wheeled armored personnel carrier Wolverine') is a family of eight-wheeled armored fighting vehicles derived from the Finnish Patria AMV. It is produced by Rosomak S.A., a Polish Armaments Group company, in Siemianowice Śląskie.

== History ==
The XC-360 transporter was developed as a successor to the Sisu XA-180 transporter, which had been in production since the early 1980s, and its subsequent versions. The first tactical and technical requirements for the new transporter were formulated in the mid-1990s, with the final version approved in 1999. A distinguishing feature of the vehicle was its modular construction and the reduction of physical signatures by limiting heat and noise emissions and specially shaping the hull to reduce radar reflection. Computer-aided design (CAD) techniques were extensively used in its development. The first mock-up of the vehicle (equipped with a twin-barrel AMOS 120mm mortar turret) was created in 2000 and showcased at the Eurosatory exhibition in Paris that same year. The first prototype was completed in November 2001, initially intended only for traction tests, but these plans were changed. At the same time, the Ministry of National Defence (Poland) announced a tender for wheeled armored personnel carriers for the Polish Army.

Plans to introduce new wheeled armored personnel carriers in Poland date back to the mid-1990s, when the mass withdrawal of SKOT carriers began (only specialist equipment carriers were retained in service). It should also be noted that the initial plans called for the purchase of a much smaller number of vehicles, intended only for use in foreign missions (in 1998, the purchase of 180 vehicles was discussed). During this period, the Polish military was involved in operations in the Balkans, among other places. There were also no plans for such heavy armament on the vehicles, which were initially to be equipped only with machine guns. By the time of the tender, these assumptions had changed to the currently known form.

On 20 May 2002, the transporter arrived in Poland to be equipped with an American Delco turret (its main armament being the 25mm M242 Bushmaster automatic cannon). The integration took place at the WZM plant in Siemianowice Śląskie, which had been a partner of Patria in the APC program from the beginning. On 22 May 2002, the vehicle was presented to military and press representatives in Sulejówek. From 24 May, it underwent firing tests with OTO Melara Hitfist-25 and Delco-25 turrets at the Wędrzyn training ground. During tests in Poland, the vehicle covered nearly 2700 km without any issues. The vehicle was then transported to Finland for the installation of propellers and a wave breaker. In September, the vehicle was back in Poland and was showcased at MSPO 2002 (equipped with the PML 127 OWS unmanned station with a 12.7mm NSW machine gun). From 9–14 September, buoyancy tests were conducted in Sulejówek with various load configurations simulating future armament. The buoyancy reserve at the maximum tested weight of 22,800 kg was 14.2%. At the end of 2002, the second AMV prototype was completed at Patria's facilities. On 20 December 2002, the Polish Ministry of National Defense's tender committee decided to select Patria as the supplier of wheeled armored personnel carriers for the Polish Army. The contract for the delivery of 690 vehicles between 2004 and 2013 was signed on 15 April 2003.

The vehicle in the Polish configuration, designated XC-360P, did not yet exist at the time of the contract signing. The most significant changes to the Polish version of the transporter included reducing the vehicle's weight from 26 tons (in the Finnish configuration) to approximately 21 tons to enable transport by C-130 Hercules aircraft and ensure amphibious capability. Other changes included reducing the vehicle's width (the external armor of the Polish configuration features a characteristic bend not present on Finnish vehicles) and equipping the vehicle with double doors instead of a hydraulically lowered ramp.

In 2004, the pre-series PS-0 transporter was completed and presented, featuring most of the solutions required for the Polish version, such as a narrowed hull and enlarged propellers (compared to prototypes). On 31 May 2004, the first two serial vehicles for the Polish Army (PL-1 and PL-2) arrived in Gdynia. They were then transported to the Siemianowice Śląskie plant, where the single Hitfist-30P turret delivered from Italy was mounted on the PL-1 hull, and both transporters were generally equipped and inspected. According to the schedule, on 30 June 2004, a ceremonial handover of both vehicles to military representatives took place in Sulejówek, and the official name "Rosomak" was given.

== Construction ==
The AMV transporter features a frame construction with a longitudinal steel beam. The suspension and drive system are mounted on this structure, providing greater rigidity and easier maintenance of certain components. The vehicle is powered by a 6-cylinder, inline, turbocharged diesel engine, the Scania DI 12 56A03PE, with a maximum power output of 360 kW (490 HP) at 2100 rpm and a continuous power output of 294 kW (400 HP). The 11.7-liter engine is liquid-cooled and works with a ZF 7HP 902S Ecomat automatic transmission with 7 forward gears and 1 reverse gear, allowing a maximum speed of over 100 km/h. Water propulsion is provided by two propellers, enabling a speed of 10 km/h. The exhaust system is equipped with an exhaust gas cooling system. The fuel capacity is 325 liters.

The vehicle has eight wheels with 14.00R20 tires, equipped with a central tire pressure regulation system. All wheels have independent suspension based on arms mounted to the support beam, and are cushioned by a hydropneumatic actuator system that allows ground clearance adjustment from +200mm to -250mm. The suspension travel is 450mm. The vehicle's turning radius is 12 meters. Terrain obstacle capabilities include: climbing slopes up to 60%; maximum side tilt up to 35 degrees; overcoming vertical walls of 0.5m; fording depths of 1.5m; and crossing trenches of 2.1m.

The Polish variant received a range of domestic solutions, such as the Stopfire fire suppression system, the Fonet internal communication system, the PNK-72 Radomka driver's observation device, and Polish VHF radios from Radmor.

The Rosomak hulls are welded from ARMSTAL 500 plates (except for the floor, which is made from ARMSTAL 450 plates), and the external armor elements (in the amphibious version) are also made from ARMSTAL 500 steel. Since 2010, the steel has been supplied by Huta Stali Jakościowych from Stalowa Wola (the first series of vehicles were made from imported steel).

== Hitfist-30P Turret ==
Designed by the Italian company Oto Melara, the Hitfist-30P turret is a two-man turret armed with a 30mm ATK Mk 44 Bushmaster II automatic cannon (equipped with a dual-feed ammunition system) and a 7.62mm UKM-2000C machine gun. The design is an evolution of the Hitfist-25 turret used on the Italian Dardo IFV. However, the turret was significantly modified to meet Polish requirements. The most significant change is the substantial reduction in height to lower the vehicle's profile, making it possible to transport it in a C-130 Hercules aircraft. Interestingly, a turret design very similar to the Polish one was used on the Italian Centauro VBM Freccia.

The turret is made of armored aluminum and equipped with additional ceramic armor. The armament is controlled by a fire control system featuring a Kolsman DNRS-288 day-night sight, a Galileo Avionica (now parto of Leonardo_ TILDE FC second-generation thermal camera, and a laser rangefinder. Additional equipment includes the SSP-1 Obra-3 sensor system and a smoke grenade launcher (which holds six 81mm grenades).

The gunner sits on the right side of the vehicle and has access to the fire control system console with controllers and a ten-inch screen, a backup (optical) sight, and cranks for rotating the turret in case of electrical system failure (the right crank controls azimuth, while the left crank controls elevation). There is also a single forward-facing periscope. In front of the gunner is the shell ejection system for the main armament and the machine gun, which the gunner operates (reloading and clearing jams).

The commander sits on the left side of the turret. The commander has access to the fire control system console and a set of eight periscopes that allow the commander to observe the situation around the vehicle. The periscopes can be lowered (retracted) so that they do not protrude beyond the turret's outline (this design was required for air transport). The commander can take full control of the vehicle's armament.

The turret's empty weight is 2350 kg, and its combat weight is 2850 kg. Its height (with retracted periscopes) is 595 mm. The turret can rotate 360 degrees, and the elevation angles of the armament range from -10 to +60 degrees. The ready-to-use 30mm ammunition supply is 220 rounds, with an additional 250 rounds stored in two magazines under the turret.

The assembly line, and later the production of the turrets, was transferred to the Bumar-Łabędy plant in Gliwice (although it remains the property of the Rosomak plant in Siemianowice Śląskie). A total of 359 Hitfist-30P turrets were produced. Currently, new Rosomaks in the combat version are delivered with the ZSSW-30 turret from Huta Stalowa Wola.

== Variants ==
=== Combat variants ===
- Rosomak Hitfist-30P – infantry fighting vehicle with an Oto Melara Hitfist-30P gun turret armed with a 30 mm ATK Mk 44 chain gun and 7.62mm NATO UKM-2000C machine gun. The turret has advanced fire control systems with thermal sights and an Obra laser warning system connected to six 81 mm 902A ZM Dezamet smoke grenade launchers. (313 vehicles initial order, final number of 359 delivered, 60 transferred to Ukraine, 8 permanently lost in Afghanistan)
- Rosomak ZSSW-30 – infantry fighting vehicle with Polish designed HSW ZSSW-30 unmanned turret armed with a 30 mm gun Mk 44S, 7.62 mm UKM-2000C machine gun and two Spike-LR ATGM. 128 were ordered by 2024, and first were delivered in December 2023. Standard Rosomak with ZSSW-30 turret, non-amphibious, old platform (70+58 vehicles ordered in two batches) 68 wehilces delivered as of November 5th, 2026
- Rosomak-L ZSSW-30 – new platform Rosomak with ZSSW-30 turret, amphibious, new engine, larger gross weight, a variant with an extended hull (increasing overall length by 0.6 m from 7.8 m to 8.4 m), while also featuring other improvements such as new Scania DC13 engine, larger fuel tanks, new water-jet propulsion propellers, an upgraded hatch for the driver-mechanic, improved rearview mirrors, and a water deflector shield. Primary design goal of this variant was to increase buoyancy to restore amphibious capabilities compromised by the added weight of the new ZSSW-30 turret. (80 vehicles ordered so far)

=== Support variants ===
- Rosomak-WEM – (WEM for Wóz Ewakuacji Medycznej – lit. "medical evacuation vehicle") – armored ambulance vehicle with crew of 3, capable of transporting 3 injured soldiers on stretchers and an additional four in a sitting position. May by deployed one per regular Rosomak company, amphibious (108 vehicles, tree batches 37+29+12+30)
- Rosomak-WRT – (WRT for Wóz Rozpoznania Technicznego – lit. "technical reconnaissance vehicle") – light technical support vehicle for every Rosomak company, amphibious (44 vehicles delivered)
- Rosomak-S – Armoured personnel carrier variant for two anti-tank teams armed with Spike anti-tank guided missile, amphibious, ATGM team as battalion level support asset or by 14. Antitank Regiment (27+60 vehicles delivered). Colloquially referred to as skateboard ("deskorolka") because of no turret
- Rosomak-NJ – (NJ for Nauka Jazdy – lit. "driving school"), amphibious (4 vehicles delivered)
- Rosomak WPT – (WPT for Wóz Pomocy Technicznej – lit. "technical help/assistance vehicle") – heavy recovery vehicle on mixed platform (short hull, new engine and larger gross weight), non-amphibious, brigade level technical support asset (18 vehicles on order)
- Rosomak RSK – (RSK for Rozpoznania Skażeń) – dedicated NBC reconnaissance vehicle (replacement for BRDM-2 RS, 11 on order)
- WD Kroton – (WD for Wóz Dowodzenia – lit. "command vehicle") – command vehicles for 18th Mechanized Division, Berberys multispectral camo as standard. Uses same command systems and radios as Polish M1 Abrams tanks (29 vehicles delivered - 17 + 12 updated Kroton-bis)
- WD Zawilec – (WD for Wóz Dowodzenia – lit. "command vehicle") – command vehicles for 16th Mechanized Division, Berberys multispectral camo as standard. Uses same command systems and radios as Polish K2GF tanks and other equipment using standard command systems (42 vehicles delivered, 6+18+18).

=== Rak Mortar system ===
- M120K Rak – 120 mm mortar artillery vehicle, first delivered in July 2017 (123 vehicles)
- Rosomak-AWD – (AWD for Artyleryjski Wóz Dowodzenia – lit. "artillery command vehicle") – Command vehicle for Rak mortar company fire module (61 vehicles)
- Rosomak-AWR – (AWD for Artyleryjski Wóz Rozpoznania – lit. "artillery recon vehicle") – Reconnaissance vehicle for Rak mortar company fire module (31 vehicles)

Rak mortar company fire module is used as battalion level support asset. Every company module has 8 gun vehicles, 4 command vehicles and 2 reconnaissance/fire control vehicles. 3 full company modules were transferred to Ukraine (with total of 24-gun vehicles).

=== ISAF related variants ===
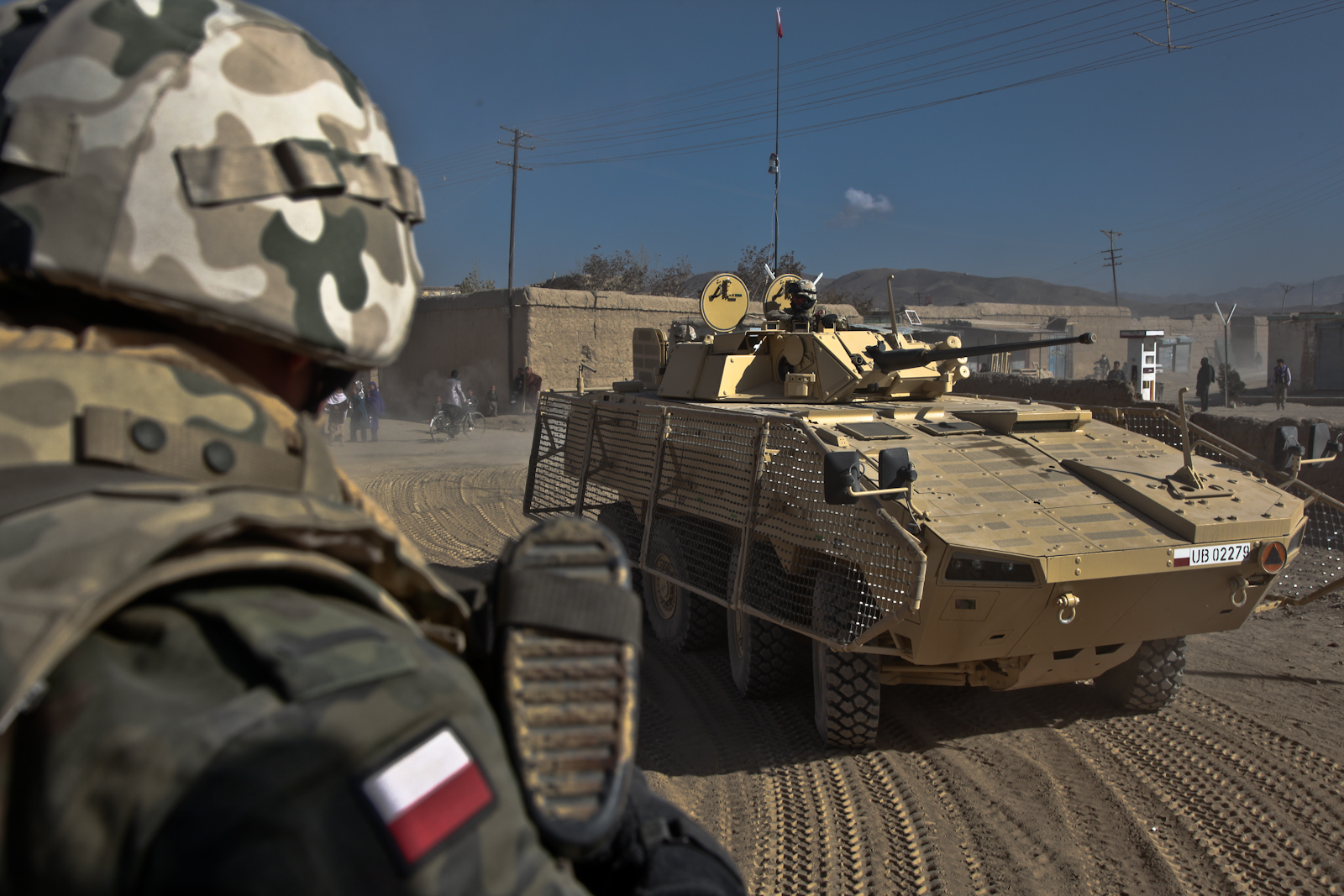
A Rosomak-M1M (late ISAF variant) patrols the Afghan city of Ghazni in 2010.

- Rosomak-M1 and M1M – A variant of standard combat vehicle with Hitfist-30P turret system modified for war in Afghanistan was called "Rosomak"-M1, equipped with additional steel-composite armour, upgraded communications (two radios as standard), wire cutters in front of driver and commander hatch, video cameras showing the back and sides of vehicle on two LCD screens in troop compartment, and a Pilar system that detects the direction of fire. Because of additional armor, this variant is no longer amphibious and has no water propellers. The variant was further upgraded to a standard known as M1M. The most noticeable change was the addition of QinetiQ RPGNet anti-RPG net and new "sand" camouflage. Other changes included installation of Duke anti-IED system and Blue Force Tracking BMS system (systems on loan from the US Army). All older ("green") M1 standard Rosomaks also received RPGNet. All vehicles were reverted to standard configuration.
- Rosomak-M2 and M3 – APC variant equipped with gun turret with 40 mm Mk-19 grenade launcher or 12.7 mm NSW/WKM-B heavy machine gun. The M2 variant was amphibious, with the base armor protection as on amphibious Hitfist-30P variant, equipped with light OSS-M turret, and intended to be used by European Union mission in Chad. The M3 variant was non-amphibious and had heavier armor equivalent to ISAF Rosomak-M1 variant. It was equipped with heavier OSS-D gun turret. Often was field modified to carry both the 12,7 NSV HMG and 7,62 UKM-2000 GPMG. Usually, the M3 variant was carrying the jamming equipment as it was easier to have electronic compatibility on simpler vehicle than on M1 variant with big 30 mm turret. (currently 39 M3 variant vehicles in the inventory)
- Rosomak-WEM and WEM-M – Vehicles deployed to Afghanistan ISAF mission were up armored to the same level as M1 variant. The WEM-M variant for Afghanistan was equipped with additional RPGNet, as with the M1M variant. ISAF variants were no longer amphibious. All vehicles were reverted to standard configuration.
- Rosomak-WSRiD – (WSRiD for Wielosensorowy System Rozpoznania i Dozoru – lit. "multisensory reconnaissance and surveillance system") – advanced vehicle with electronic equipment used to protect forward fire bases. Equipped with UAVs, optical and seismic sensors. (4 vehicles)

=== Notable prototype vehicles not adopted into service ===
- Rosomak-1 - the infantry APC variant with remote weapon station and 12,7 mm machinegun, Polish Ministry of Defence decided instead to acquire vehicles armed with unmanned turrets with 30 mm gun and ATGM eventually resulting in ZSSW-30 turret.
- Wilk (pol. "Wolf") - Fire support variant equipped with Cockerill CT-CV turret with 105 mm high-pressure gun capable of firing different variants of modern 105 mm ammunition like the M1060CV AP round and Falarick 105 barrel-launched ATGM. Some motorized infantry brigades are planned to have a single tank battalion instead.
- Rosomak-XP - an updated version of the armoured personnel carrier was presented by Rosomak S.A. in September 2015 at the MSPO defence exhibition in Kielce. As part of the modernization, the gross vehicle weight rating (GVWR) was increased to 32 tonnes. In addition, a new 450 kW engine was installed, along with a new drivetrain, new wheels with 16.00R20 tyres, new rear troop ramp, and the level of ballistic and mine protection increased. Correspondingly, the licence holder Patria also presented a new version called the AMV2 Havoc intended for the US Marine Corps.

== Gallery ==
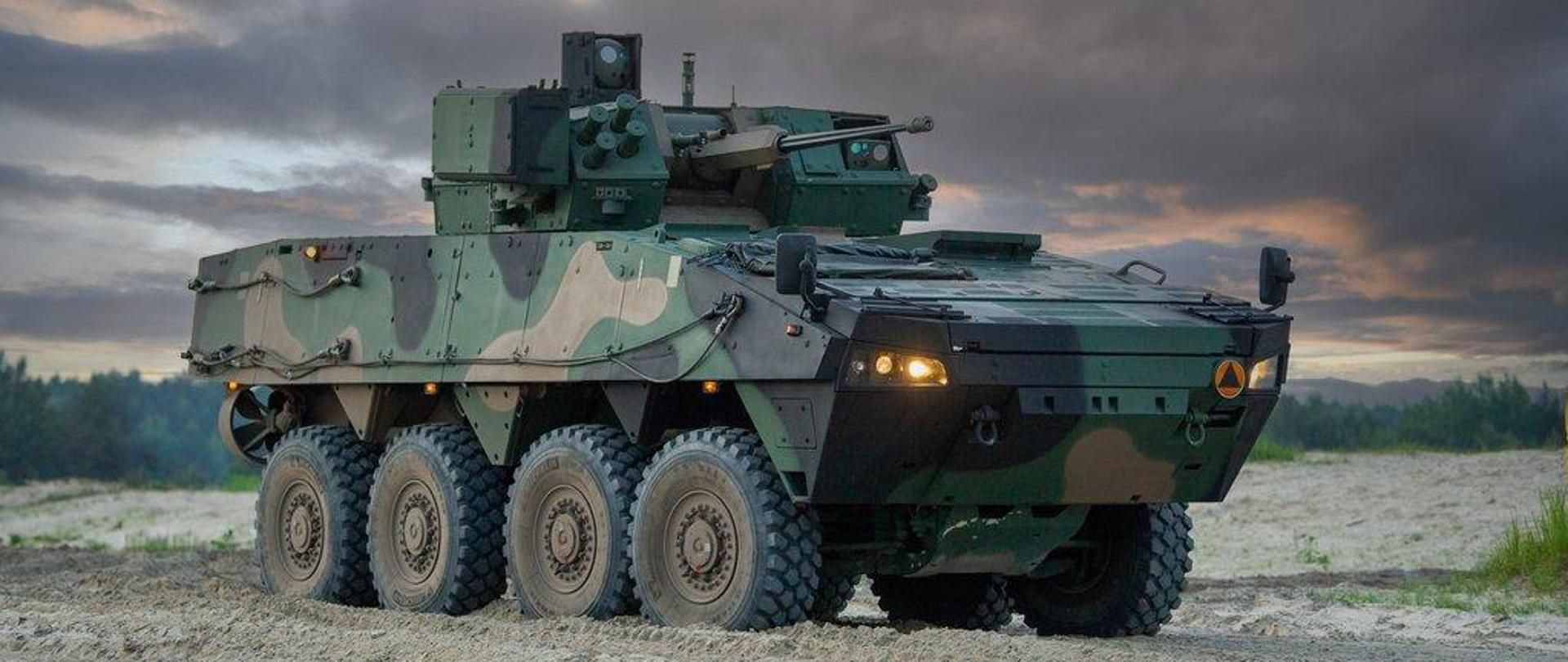
Rosomak ZSSW-30

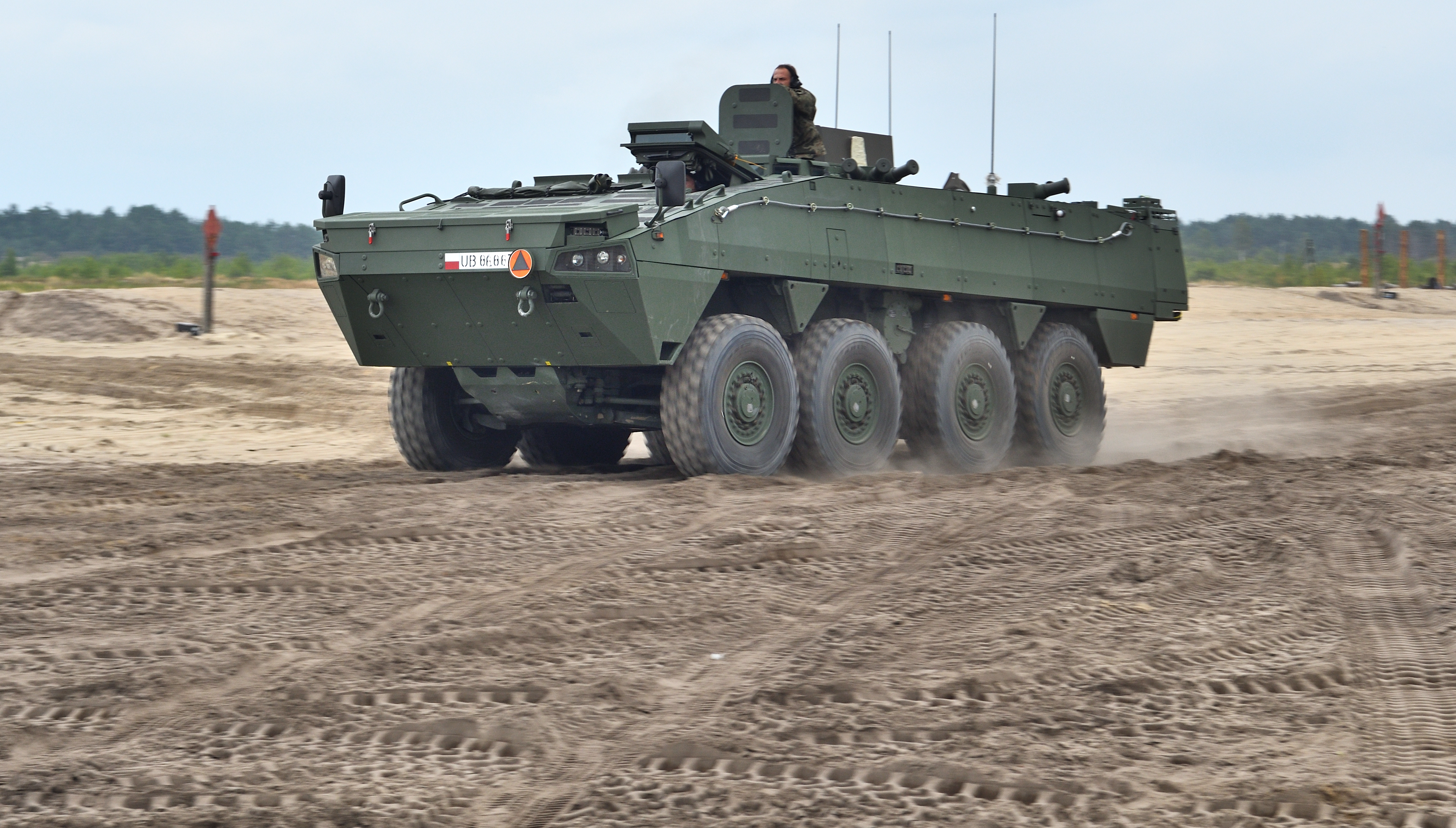
Rosomak-AWD

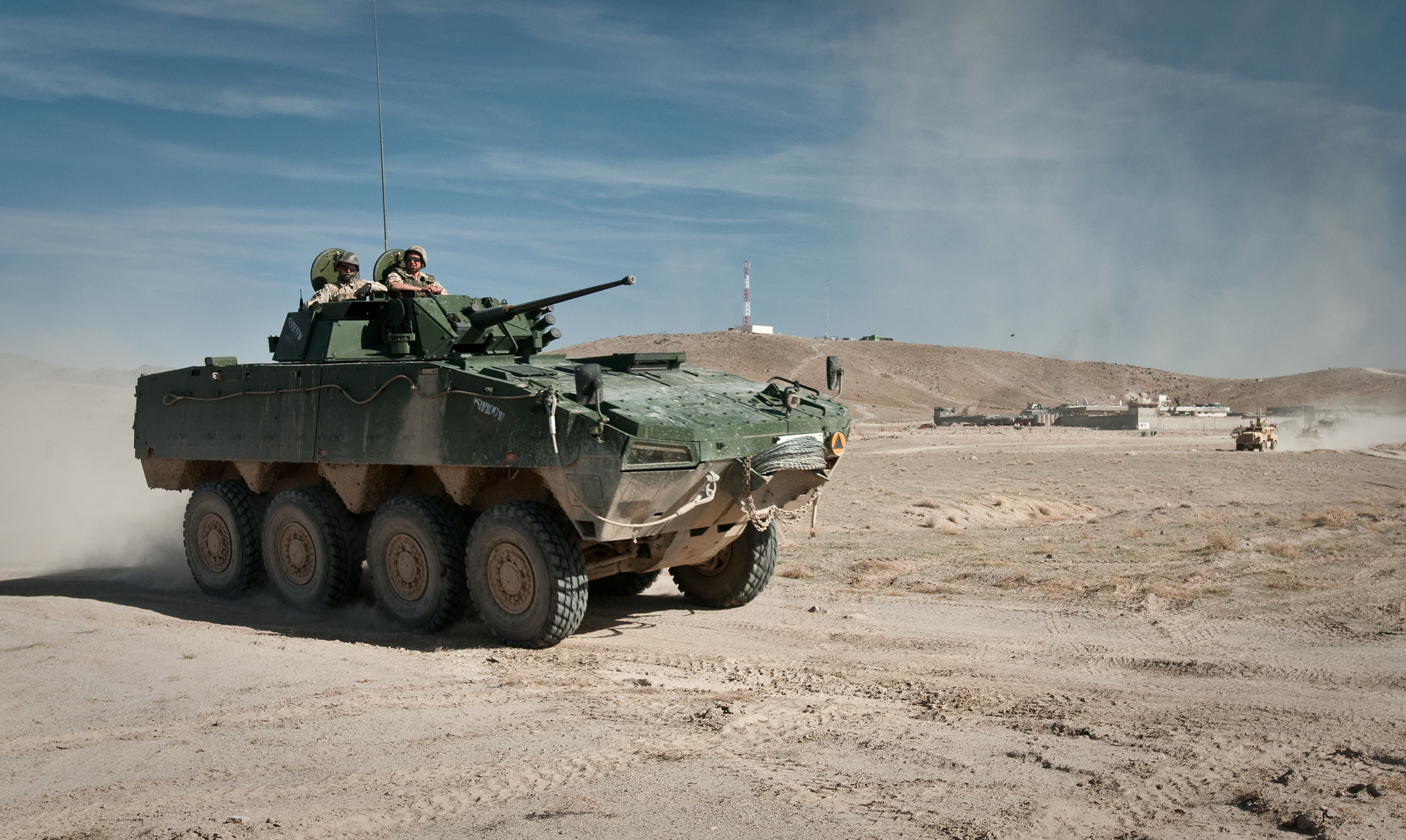
Rosomak-M1 (early ISAF variant)

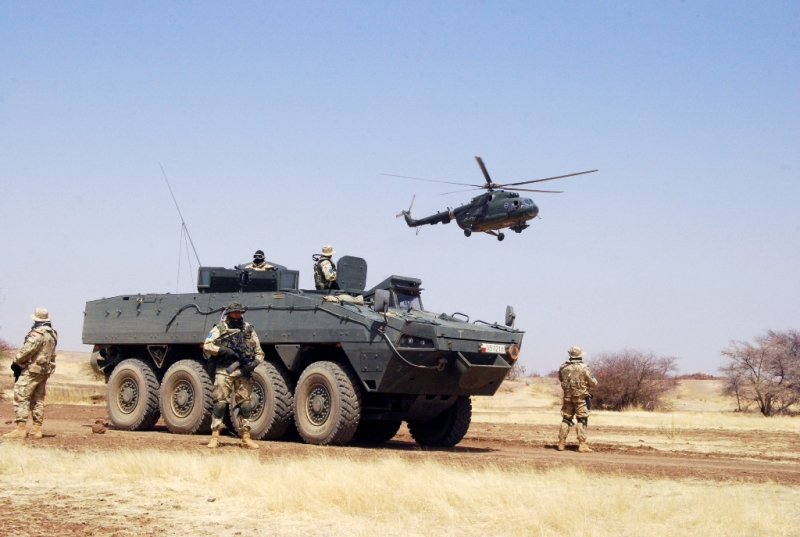
Rosomak-M2 (European Union mission in Chad)

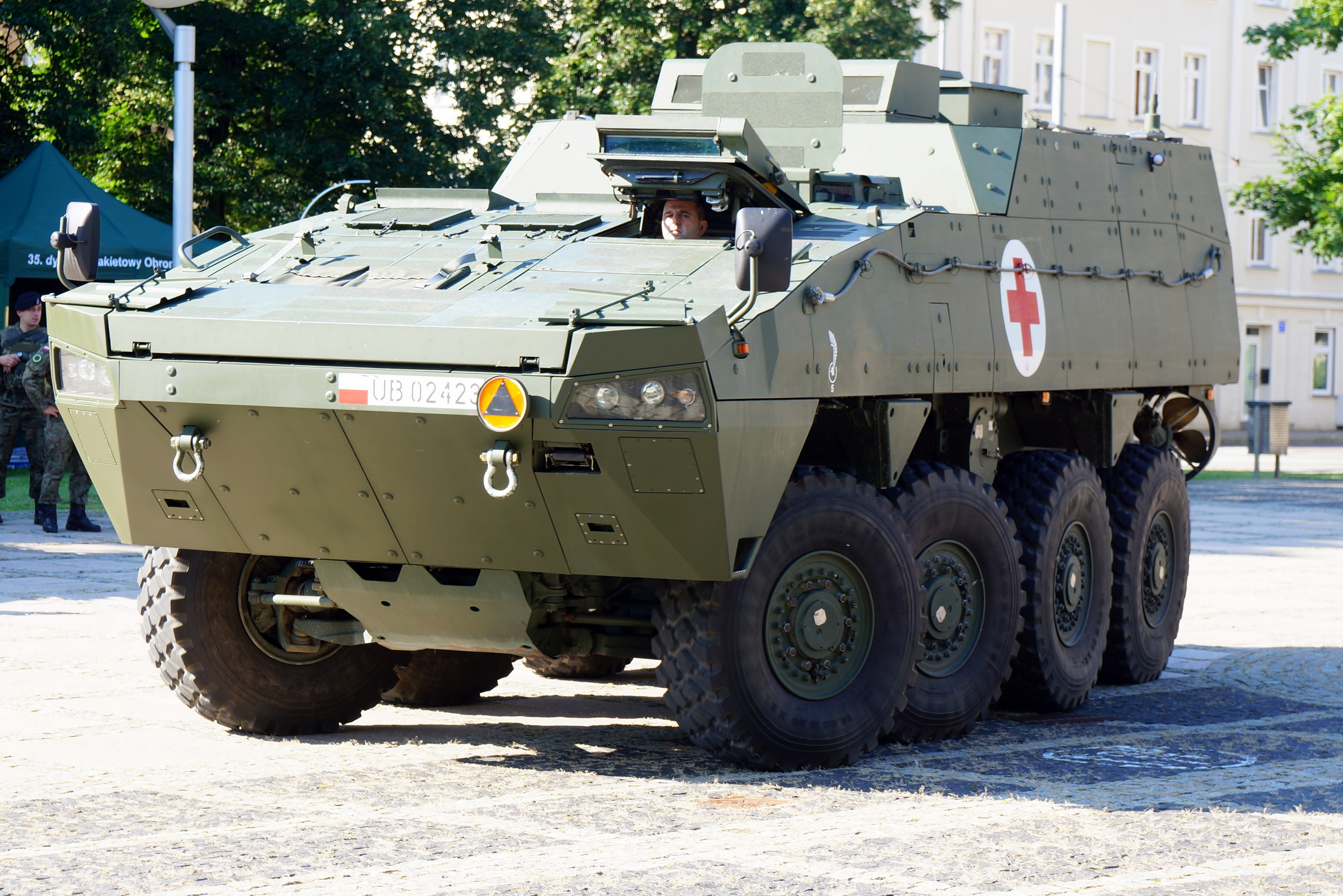
Rosomak-WEM

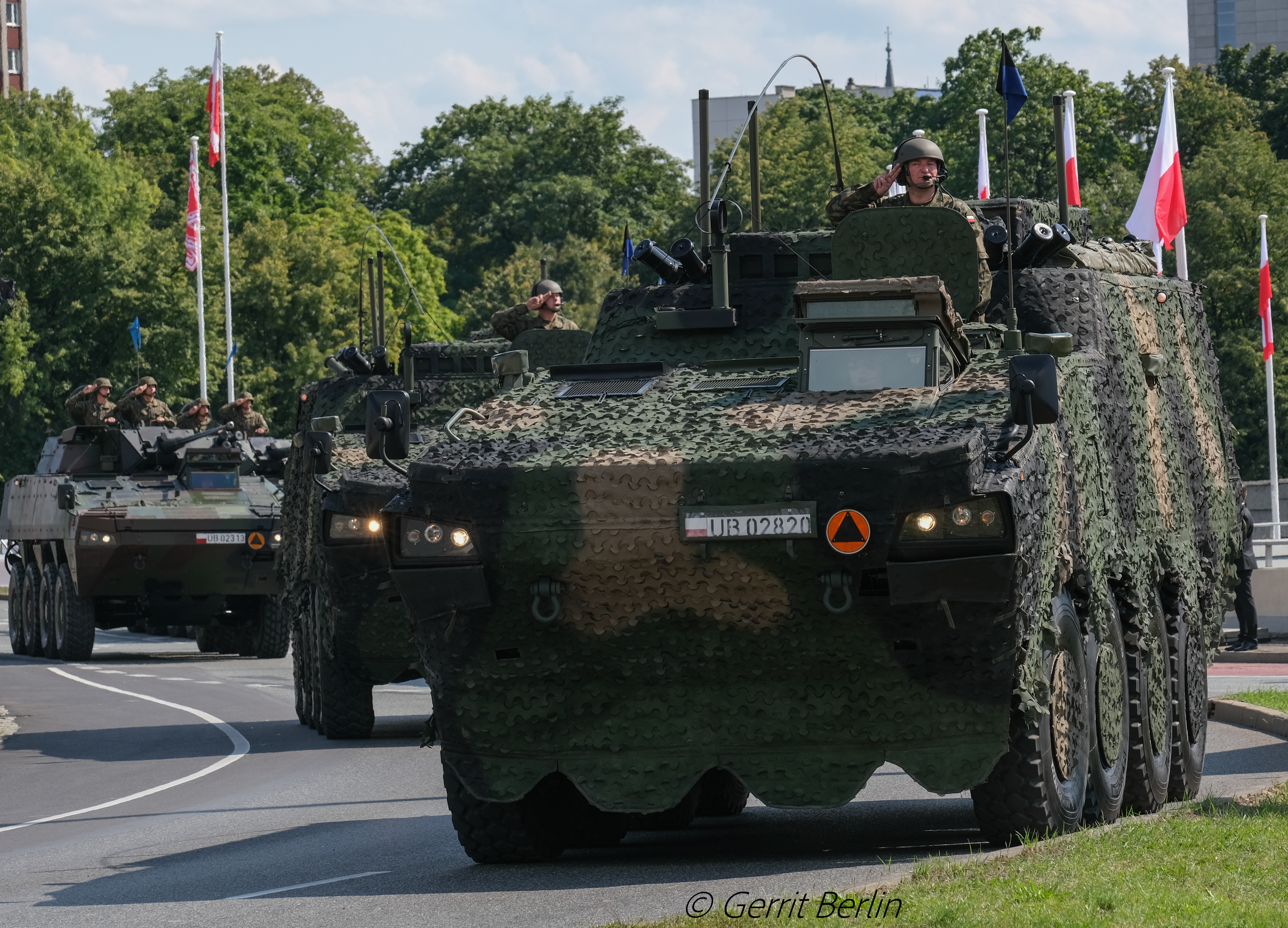
WD Kroton

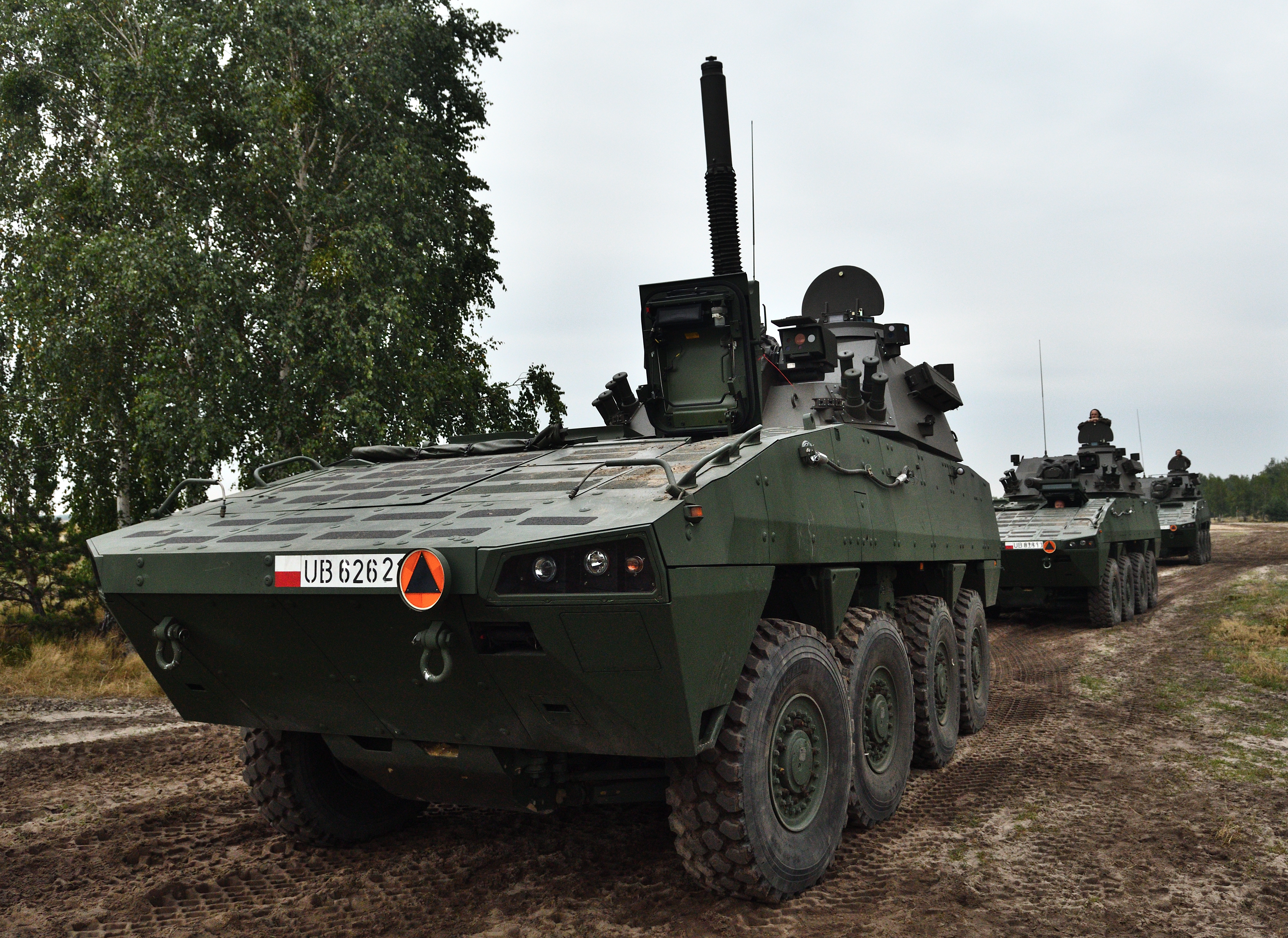
M120K Rak

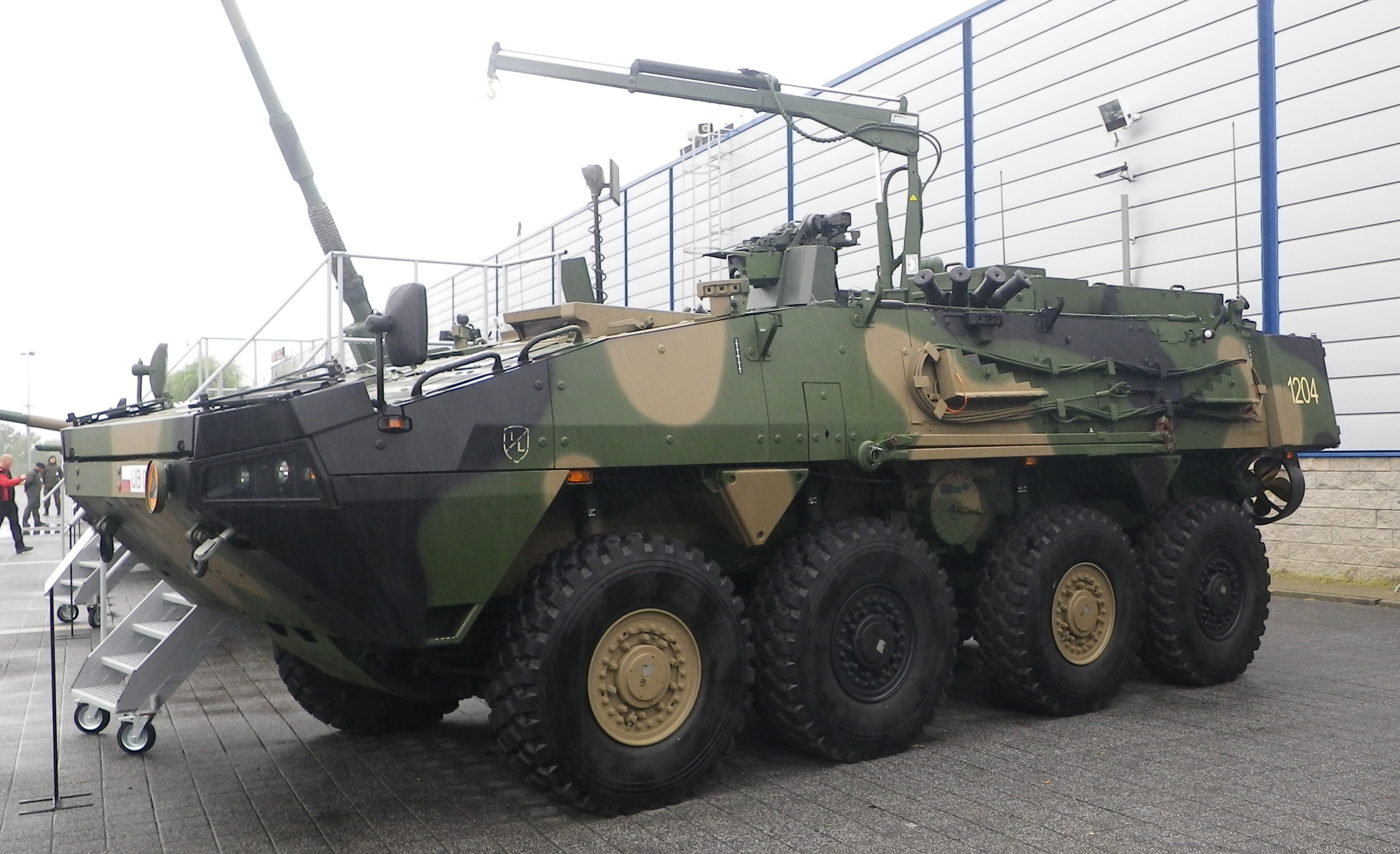
Rosomak-WRT

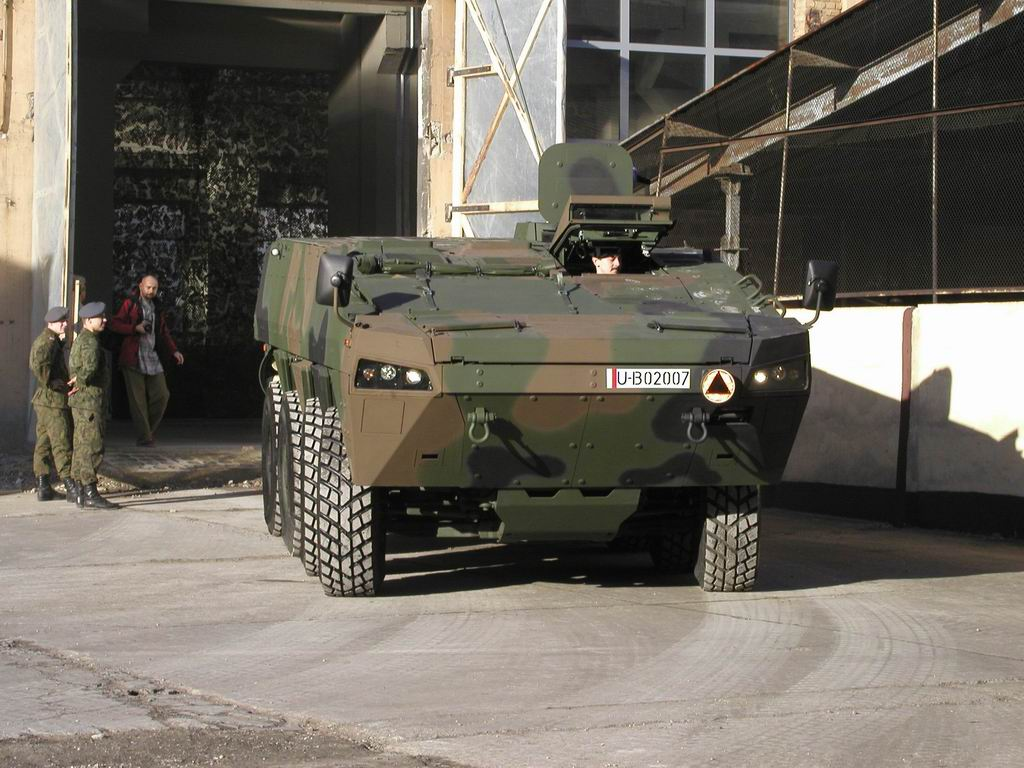
Basic KTO Rosomak

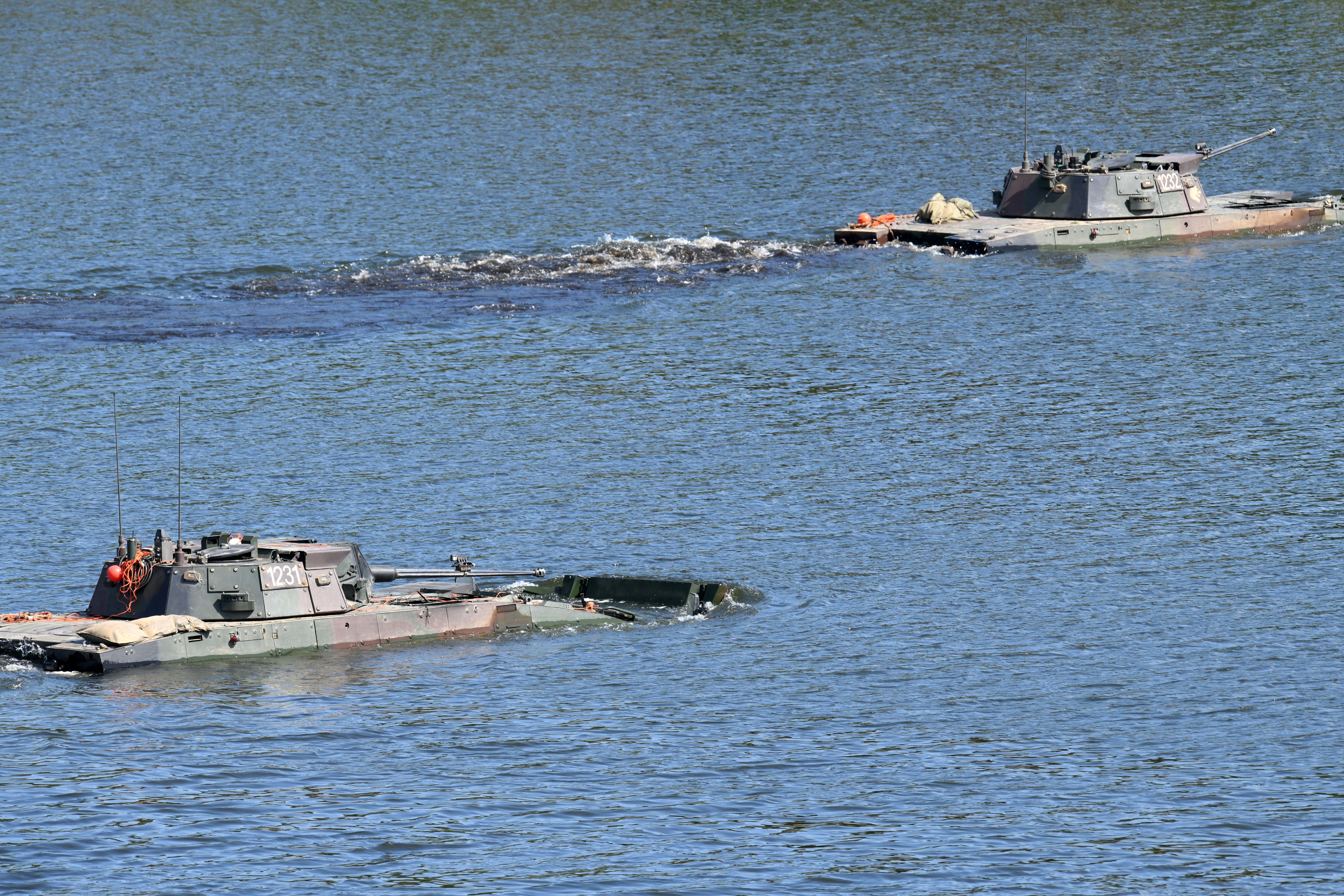

== Combat history ==
War in Afghanistan (2001–2021)

The Polish Land Forces contingent, part of the International Security Assistance Force, operated over 100 KTO Rosomak vehicles, including five medevac versions, during the Afghanistan War. The APCs were equipped with additional steel-composite armor. In early 2008, a Polish Rosomak serving in Afghanistan, the version with upgraded armor, was attacked by the Taliban. The vehicle was hit by RPG-7 rockets, but managed to fire back and returned to base without requiring assistance.

In June 2008, the Taliban attacked a Rosomak with an RPG, hitting it in its frontal armor without penetrating it. In 2009, the first soldier was reported killed while traveling in a Rosomak after an improvised explosive device exploded under the vehicle, which rolled over and crushed the gunner who had been standing in the open turret. Similar attacks had occurred before but had failed to inflict casualties.

European Union mission in Chad (2007–2008)
European Union Force Chad/CAR

Russian Invasion of Ukraine (2022–present)

- The Polish government announced in April 2023 it would provide the Ukrainian government with 200 KTO Rosomak. It was reported that the Ukrainian army's 21st Mechanized Brigade began receiving the first batch of these 25-ton, eight-wheel APCs in July 2023.
- According to Oryx blog, at least 6 such units were destroyed and 1 was damaged during the ongoing Ukraine War.

== Operators ==
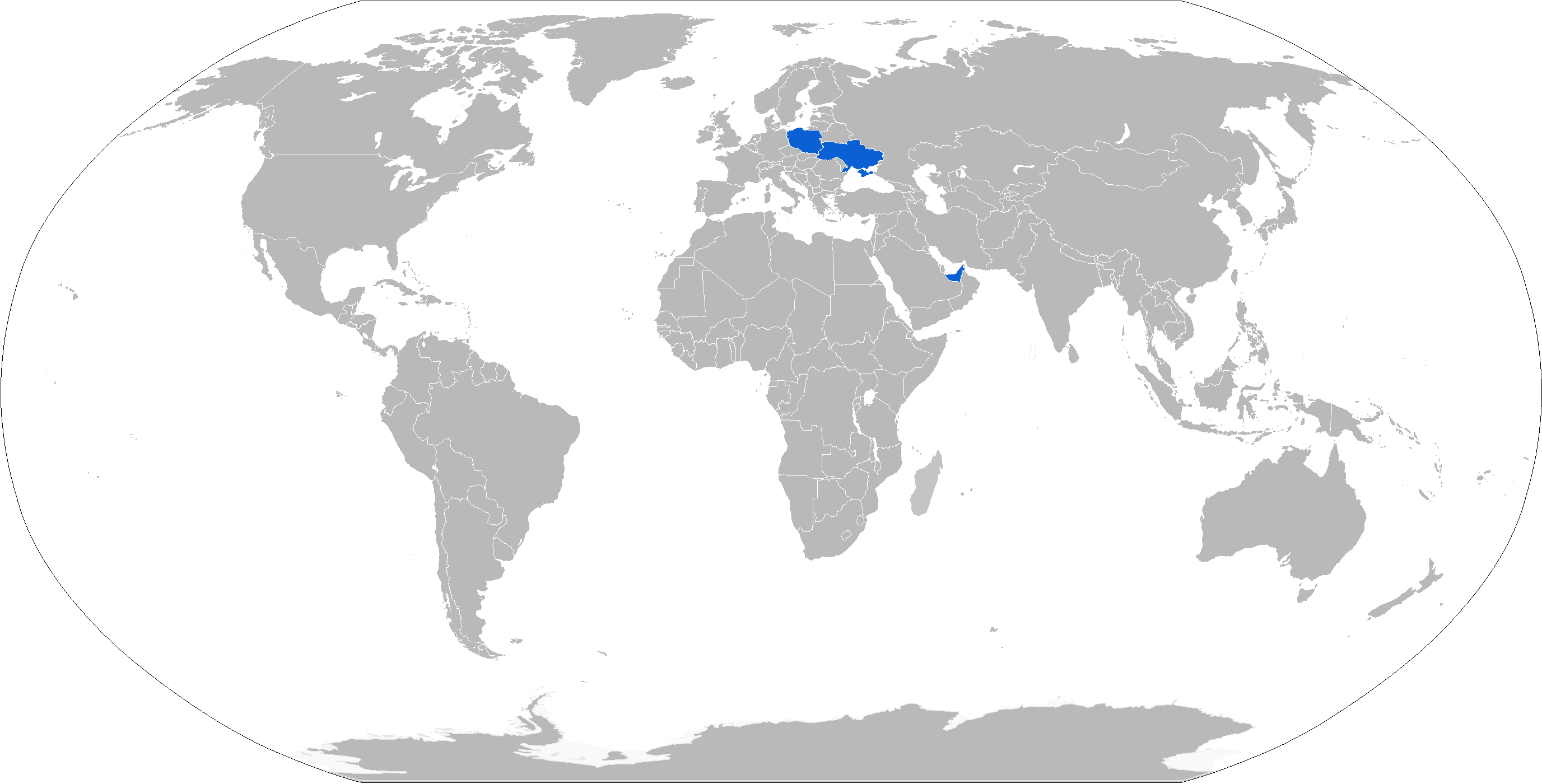
Map with KTO Rosomak operators in blue

=== Current operators ===
- Poland: 1090 vehicles delivered or on order in 16 different configurations. ~100 transferred to Ukraine, unknown number of permanent loses in Afghanistan. Main users include:
  - 12. Mechanized Brigade – combat variant with Hitfist-30P, Rak mortar system and support vehicles
  - 17. Mechanized Brigade – combat variant with Hitfist-30P, Rak mortar system and support vehicles
  - 21. Mountain Brigade – combat variant with ZSSW-30, Rak mortar system and support vehicles
  - 14. Anti-Tank Regiment – Spike missile team transporter and support vehicles
  - 1. Armored Brigade and 19. Mechanized Brigade received the Kroton command variant and medical variant
  - 9. Armored Cavalry Brigade and 20. Mechanized Brigade received the Zawilec command variant and medical variant
  - New motorised brigades are organized: the 2nd, 16th and 18th Motorized Brigades. Received limited number of Rosomaks for training.
- Ukraine: Ukraine received two battalions of combat variant with Hitfist-30P turret (30–31 vehicles each) and three companies with Rak mortar system (usually 8 gun vehicles, 4 command vehicles and 2 fire control vehicles each)
- United Arab Emirates: 40 Patria AMV fully equipped hulls manufactured in Siemianowice Śląskie, Poland

=== Failed bids ===
- Slovenia: competition for up to 106 APC with a budget of €700 million after rejecting the contract for the Boxer. The finalists of the competition are the Piranha V, the Freccia, the Rosomak L and the Patria AMV^{XP}. Initially the Rosomak was considered, but issues were experienced with getting the certification for the vehicles' undercarriage. In the end Patria AMVxp was chosen.
- Malaysia In 2006, the KTO Rosomak was tested in Malaysia. but decided on cooperating with Turkish FNSS, a producer of Pars 8x8, to develop local development under the name DefTech AV8 Gempita.

== See also ==
=== Comparable vehicles ===
- Stryker – (United States, Canada)
- LAV III/LAV AFV/LAV-25/ASLAV – (Australia)
- K808 White Tiger – (South Korea)
- Boxer – (Germany, Netherlands)
- Freccia IFV – (Italy)
- BTR-90 – (Russia)
- CM-32 armoured vehicle – (Taiwan)
- Type 96 armored personnel carrier – (Japan)
- Type 16 maneuver combat vehicle – (Japan)
- Patria AMV – (Finland)
- BTR-4 – (Ukraine)
- Saur 2 – (Romania)
- Type 25 RCV – (Japan)
- VBCI – (France)
- FNSS Pars – (Turkey)
- Mowag Piranha – (Switzerland)
- TATA Kestrel – (India)
