= List of infantry fighting vehicles =

This page lists some of the infantry fighting vehicles and some of their main characteristics.

== List of tracked infantry fighting vehicles ==
=== Tracked IFV in service ===
Chassis base	Variant	Origin	Image	Operators	Notes
AMX-10P	AMX-10P (GIAT Industries)	France		(France) French Army (Greece) Hellenic Army (Qatar) Qatari Army (Saudi Arabia) Saudi Arabian Army (United Arab Emirates) UAE Army	This is an amphibious IFV. Toucan II turret (by GIAT industries), equipped with: (Note: Autocannon) GIAT M693 F2 (20×139mm); (Note: Coaxial machine gun) AA-52 (7.62×51mm NATO); (Note: Smoke grenade dispenser) 2× 2 smoke grenade dispensers
AMX-10P	AMX-10P 25 (Marines ICV) (GIAT Industries)	France	—	Singapore Army	This is an amphibious IFV. Dragar turret (by GIAT / Nexter) equipped with: GIAT M811 (NATO 25×137mm); FN MAG (7.62×51mm NATO); (Note: Pintle mount) FN MAG (7.62×51mm NATO); 2× 2 smoke grenade dispensers
ASCOD "Austrian-Spanish Co-operative Development"	Ulan (Steyr-Daimler-Puch Spezialfahrzeug)	Austria Spain		(Austria) Austrian Land Forces	SP30 turret (by GDELS) equipped with: MK 30-2/ABM (30×173mm); FN MAG (7.62×51mm NATO); 2× 6 KMW MPL 76 (76 mm)
ASCOD "Austrian-Spanish Co-operative Development"	VCI/C Pizarro "Vehículo de combate infantería/caballería" (GDELS SBS)	Austria Spain		(Spain) Spanish Army	SP30 turret (by GDELS) equipped with: MK 30-2/ABM (30×173mm); MG 3S (7.62×51mm NATO); 2× 6 KMW MPL 76 (76 mm)
ASCOD 2 "Austrian-Spanish Co-operative Development 2"	Hunter	Austria Spain	—	Latvia	UT-30 Mk2 turret (by Elbit) equipped with: Mk44S Bushmaster II (30×173mm); (7.62×51mm NATO); 2× 3 smoke grenade dispensers
Bionix	Bionix 25 (ST Kinetics)	Singapore		Singapore Army	Turret equipped with: M242 Bushmaster (NATO 25×137mm); GPMG ST Kinetics (7.62×51mm NATO); GPMG ST Kinetics (7.62×51mm NATO); 2× 3 SDS-93 (93 mm); Chassis equipped with: GPMG ST Kinetics (7.62×51mm NATO)
Bionix	Bionix II (ST Kinetics)	Singapore		Singapore Army	Turret equipped with: Mk44S Bushmaster II (30×173mm); GPMG ST Kinetics (7.62×51mm NATO); GPMG ST Kinetics (7.62×51mm NATO); 2× 3 SDS-93 (93 mm); Chassis equipped with: GPMG ST Kinetics (7.62×51mm NATO)
BMP-1	BVP-M	Slovakia		(Slovakia) Slovak Ground Forces	TURRA 30 COAPS unmanned turret equipped with: Shipunov 2A42 (30x165mm); PKTM (7.62×54mmR); (Note: Anti-tank guided missile) 2× 9M113 Konkurs (that replaced the 9M14 Malyutka)
BMP-1	MLI-84M1	Soviet Union Romania		(Romania) Romanian Land Forces	OWS-25R turret (by Rafael) equipped with: Oerlikon KBA (NATO 25×137mm); DShK 1938/46 (12.7×108mm); 2× Spike LR (that replaced the 9M14-2T Maljutka-2T); 6× smoke grenade dispensers
Borsuk (Badger)	Borsuk infantry fighting vehicle (HSW)	Poland		(Poland) Polish Land Forces	The Borsuk is an amphibious IFV. ZSSW-30 turret (by HSW and WB Electronics) equipped with: Mk44S Bushmaster II (30×173mm); UKM-2000C (7.62×51mm NATO); 2× Spike-LR; 2× 4 GAk-81 (81 mm)
CV90 Mk I "Combat Vehicle 90"	Strf 9040 "Stridsfordon 9040" (Land Systems Hagglunds)	Sweden		First-hand: (Sweden) Swedish Army	The Strf 9040 exists in several variants: 9040, 9040A, 9040B, 040B1 and 9040C. E-series turret (by Land Systems Hagglunds) equipped with: 40 mm Bofors L/70 (40×365mm R); Ksp m/39 machine gun, later replaced with MAG 58 (7.62×51mm NATO); 2× 3 Galix
CV90 Mk I "Combat Vehicle 90"	Strf 9040 "Stridsfordon 9040" (Land Systems Hagglunds)	Sweden		Second-hand: (Ukraine) Ukrainian Ground Forces	The Strf 9040 exists in several variants: 9040, 9040A, 9040B, 040B1 and 9040C. E-series turret (by Land Systems Hagglunds) equipped with: 40 mm Bofors L/70 (40×365mm R); Ksp m/39 machine gun, later replaced with MAG 58 (7.62×51mm NATO); 2× 3 Galix
CV90 Mk II "Combat Vehicle 90"	CV9030 FIN (Alvis Hagglunds AB / Patria Vehicles Oy)	SwedenFinland		(Finland) Finnish Army	E30 turret (by BAE Systems AB) equipped with: Before modernisation: Mk44S Bushmaster II (30×173mm); PKMT (7.62×54mmR); 2× 4 + 1× 2 smoke grenade dispensers; Modernisation changes: 3× 3 smoke grenade dispensers
CV90 Mk II "Combat Vehicle 90"	CV9030 CH (RUAG / BAE Systems AB)	Sweden Switzerland		(Switzerland) Swiss Army	E30 turret (by BAE Systems AB) equipped with: Mk44S Bushmaster II (30×173mm); MG 51 (7.50×55mm Swiss (GP11)); 2× 4 Nb Pat 95 el Zü by Diehl / SW Thun AG (76 mm)
CV90 Mk III "Combat Vehicle 90"	CV9035 DK (BAE Systems AB / Hydrema A/S)	SwedenDenmark		(Denmark) Danish Army	E35 turret (by BAE Systems AB) equipped with: Bushmaster III (35×228 mm); MG3 (7.62×51mm NATO); 2× 5 smoke grenade dispensers
CV90 Mk III "Combat Vehicle 90"	CV9035 NL (BAE Systems AB / Van Halteren Metaal BV)	SwedenNetherlands		First-hand: Royal Netherlands Army	44 sold by the Netherlands to Estonia. This variant is being modernised with a new turret. E35 turret (by BAE Systems AB) equipped with: Bushmaster III (35×228 mm); MAG 58C (7.62×51mm NATO); 2× 5 smoke grenade dispensers
CV90 Mk III "Combat Vehicle 90"	CV9035 EE (BAE Systems AB)	Sweden		Second-hand: (Estonia) Estonian Land Forces	E35 turret (by BAE Systems AB) equipped with: Bushmaster III (35×228 mm); MAG 58C (7.62×51mm NATO); 2× 5 smoke grenade dispensers
CV90 Mk III "Combat Vehicle 90"	CV9035 NL MLU (new turret made by Van Halteren Defence)	Sweden Netherlands		Modernised: Royal Netherlands Army	D-Series turret (designed by BAE Systems AB, made by Van Halteren Defence) equipped with: Bushmaster III (35×228 mm); MAG 58C (7.62×51mm NATO) in a pod; 2× Spike LR2; (Note: Active protection system) Iron Fist LD (Light Decoupled); 1× 5 smoke grenade dispensers
CV90 Mk IIIb "Combat Vehicle 90"	CV9030N (BAE Systems AB)	Sweden		(Norway) Norwegian Army	74 new IFV hulls manufactured since 2012, and turret from the vehicle above repurposed and modernised. E30 turret (by BAE Systems AB) equipped with: Mk44S Bushmaster II (30×173mm); MAG 58C (7.62×51mm NATO); (Note: Remote controlled weapon station) Kongsberg Protector with MAG 58 (7.62×51mm NATO) or M2 Browning (12.7×99mm NATO); 4× 3 smoke grenade dispensers
CV90 Mk IIIC "Combat Vehicle 90"	CV9035 DK (BAE Systems Hägglunds and new turret made by Van Halteren Defence)	Sweden Netherlands	—	(Denmark) Danish Army	D-Series turret (designed by BAE Systems AB, made by Van Halteren Defence) equipped with: Bushmaster III (35×228 mm); MAG 58C (7.62×51mm NATO) in a pod; 2× Spike LR2; 1× 5 smoke grenade dispensers
CV90 Mk IIIC "Combat Vehicle 90"	Strf9035 (BAE Systems Hägglunds and new turret made by Van Halteren Defence)	Sweden Netherlands	—	(Sweden) Swedish Army	D-Series turret (designed by BAE Systems AB, made by Van Halteren Defence) equipped with: Bushmaster III (35×228 mm); MAG 58C (7.62×51mm NATO) in a pod; 2× RBS 58 (Akeron MP); 1× 5 smoke grenade dispensers
CV90 Mk IIIC "Combat Vehicle 90"	CV9035 UKR (BAE Systems Hägglunds and new turret made by Van Halteren Defence)	Sweden Netherlands	—	(Ukraine) Ukrainian Ground Forces	D-Series turret (designed by BAE Systems AB, made by Van Halteren Defence) equipped with: Bushmaster III (35×228 mm); MAG 58C (7.62×51mm NATO) in a pod; 1× 5 smoke grenade dispensers
Dardo	VCC-80 Dardo (Iveco)	Italy		(Italy) Italian Army	Hitfist turret (by Oto Melara) equipped with: Oerlikon KBA (NATO 25×137mm); MG 42/59 (7.62×51mm NATO); 2× 4 smoke grenade dispensers (80mm); 20 Dardo transport a ICLU Spike LR shoulder missile launchers.
FNSS ACV-15 (licence built variant of M113A1)	ACV-AIFV (licence built variant of YPR-765 by FNSS)	United States Netherlands Turkey	(before modernisation)	(Turkey) Turkish Army	EWS turret (by FMC) equipped with: Oerlikon KBA-B02 (NATO 25×137mm); FN MAG (7.62×51mm NATO); 1× 6 smoke grenade dispensers; Being ,modernised with Nefer turret (by Aselsan), equipped with: M242 Bushmaster (NATO 25×137mm); FN MAG (7.62×51mm NATO); 2× 3 smoke grenade dispensers
FNSS ACV-15 (licence built variant of M113A1)	FNSS ACV-AIFV (licence built variant of AIFV by FNSS)	United States Turkey		(Turkey) Turkish Army	Dragar turret (by GIAT / Nexter) equipped with: GIAT M811 (NATO 25×137mm); FN MAG (7.62×51mm NATO); 1× 6 smoke grenade dispensers
FNSS ACV-S (licence built variant of M113A3)	ACV-300 (licence built variant of AIFV by FNSS)	United States Turkey		(Malaysia) Malaysian Army	Sharpshooter turret (by FNSS and BAE Systems) equipped with: M242 Bushmaster (NATO 25×137mm); Coaxial machine gun Gun (calibre); 1× 8 + 2 × 3 smoke grenade dispensers
FV510 Warrior	FV510 ISC Warrior "Infantry Section Vehicle" (GKN Sankey / BAE Systems)	United Kingdom		(United Kingdom) British Army	Turret (by GKN Sankey) equipped with: L21A1 RARDEN (30×170 mm); L94A1 (7.62×51mm NATO); 2× 4 smoke grenade dispensers (66 mm); 105 Warrior ISC were used as ATGM team carriers, with a MILAN shoulder missile launchers, and later a Javelin missile.
FV510 Warrior	Desert Warrior (GKN Sankey / BAE Systems)	United Kingdom		Kuwait Army	LAV-25 turret (by Delco) equipped with: M242 Bushmaster (NATO 25×137mm); FN MAG (7.62×51mm NATO); 2× BGM-71 TOW (1 on each side); 2× 4 M257 (76mm)
Hunter AFV	Hunter AFV (ST Kinetics)	Singapore		Singapore Army	Samson 30 unmanned turret (by Rafael) equipped with: Mk44S Bushmaster II (30×173mm); M240 (7.62×51mm NATO); 2× Spike LR 2; 2× 4 KMW MPL 76 (76 mm); Chassis equipped with: Trophy APS
K21	K21 NIFV "Next-generation infantry fighting vehicle" (Doosan DST / Hanwha)	South Korea		(South Korea) Republic of Korea Army	This IFV is capable of amphibious missions. Turret equipped with: SNT Dynamics K40 (40×365mmR); M60 E2 (7.62×51mm NATO); 2× 5 smoke grenade dispensers
K21	AS21 Redback (Doosan DST / Hanwha)	South Korea Australia Israel		(Australia) Australian Army	EOS / Elbit Т2000 (Electro Optic Systems) turret equipped with: Mk44S Bushmaster II (30×173mm); MAG 58 (7.62×51mm NATO); EOS R400S Mk2 HD (7.62×51mm NATO, 12.7×99mm NATO or 40×53mm HV); 2× Spike LR2; Iron Fist (Elbit); 2× 4 M259 (76mm)
KF-41 Lynx	KF-41 Lynx (Rheinmetall)	Germany Hungary		(Hungary) Hungarian Ground Forces	LANCE 2 turret (by Rheinmetall) equipped with: MK 30-2/ABM (30×173mm); RMG 7.62 (7.62×51mm NATO); Rheinmetall MSSA with M2 Browning (12.7×99mm NATO); 2× Spike LR / LR2; (Note: Loitering munition) 2× HERO Loitering Munition; 4× 5 Rheinmetall ROSY (40 mm); Chassis equipped with: StrikeShield AMAP-ADS (hard kill)
KF-41 Lynx	KF-41 Lynx (Rheinmetall)	Germany Romania	—	(Romania) Romanian Land Forces	LANCE 2 turret (by Rheinmetall) equipped with: MK 30-2/ABM (30×173mm); RMG 7.62 (7.62×51mm NATO); Rheinmetall MSSA with M2 Browning (12.7×99mm NATO); 2× Spike LR / LR2; 4× 5 Rheinmetall ROSY (40 mm); Chassis equipped with: StrikeShield AMAP-ADS (hard kill)
KF-41 Lynx	KF-41 Lynx (Rheinmetall)	Germany	—	(Ukraine) Ukrainian Ground Forces	LANCE 2 turret (by Rheinmetall) equipped with: MK 30-2/ABM (30×173mm); RMG 7.62 (7.62×51mm NATO); Rheinmetall MSSA with M2 Browning (12.7×99mm NATO); 4× 5 Rheinmetall ROSY (40 mm); Chassis equipped with: StrikeShield AMAP-ADS (hard kill)
M113 A1	AIFV-25 (FMC Corporation / Belgian Mechanical Fabrication)	United States Belgium		First-hand: (Belgium) Belgian Land Component	EWS turret (by FMC) equipped with: Oerlikon KBA-B02 (NATO 25×137mm); FN MAG (7.62×51mm NATO); 1× 6 smoke grenade dispensers
M113 A1	AIFV-25 (FMC Corporation / Belgian Mechanical Fabrication)	United States Belgium		Second-hand: (Bahrain) Royal Bahraini Army (Chile) Chilean Army (Egypt) Egyptian Army (Lebanon) Lebanese Army (Philippines) Philippine Army (Jordan) Royal Jordanian Army (Morocco) Royal Moroccan Army	EWS turret (by FMC) equipped with: Oerlikon KBA-B02 (NATO 25×137mm); FN MAG (7.62×51mm NATO); 1× 6 smoke grenade dispensers
M113 A1	YPR-765 (FMC Corporation / DAF / RSV)	United States Netherlands		First-hand: Royal Netherlands Army	EWS turret (by FMC) equipped with: Oerlikon KBA-B02 (NATO 25×137mm); FN MAG (7.62×51mm NATO); 1× 6 smoke grenade dispensers
M113 A1	YPR-765 (FMC Corporation / DAF / RSV)	United States Netherlands		Second-hand: (Bahrain) Royal Bahraini Army (Chile) Chilean Army (Egypt) Egyptian Army (Jordan) Royal Jordanian Army (Ukraine) Ukrainian Ground Forces	EWS turret (by FMC) equipped with: Oerlikon KBA-B02 (NATO 25×137mm); FN MAG (7.62×51mm NATO); 1× 6 smoke grenade dispensers
M2 Bradley	M2 Bradley: M2A1; M2A2; M2A2 ODS; M2A3; M2A4E1; (United Defense / BAE Systems)	United States		First-hand: (United States) US Army (Saudi Arabia) Saudi Arabian Army	Bradley turret (by BAE Systems) equipped with: M242 Bushmaster (NATO 25×137mm); M240C (7.62×51mm NATO); 2× BGM-71 TOW; 2× 4 M259 (76mm); Iron Fist APS (M2A4E1)
M2 Bradley	M2 Bradley: M2A1; M2A2; M2A2 ODS; M2A3; M2A4E1; (United Defense / BAE Systems)	United States		Second-hand: (Croatia) Croatian Army (Lebanon) Lebanese Army (Ukraine) Ukrainian Ground Forces	Bradley turret (by BAE Systems) equipped with: M242 Bushmaster (NATO 25×137mm); M240C (7.62×51mm NATO); 2× BGM-71 TOW; 2× 4 M259 (76mm); Iron Fist APS (M2A4E1)
Marder	Spz Marder 1 "Schützenpanzer Marder" (Rheinmetall Landsysteme / MaK - Maschinenbau Kiel)	West Germany		First-hand: (Germany) German Army	Turret equipped with: Rheinmetall Mk 20 Rh-202 (20×139 mm); MG 3A1 (7.62×51mm NATO); 1× mount for missile launcher (MILAN, Spike LR); 1× 6 smoke grenade dispensers (76 mm)
Marder	Spz Marder 1 "Schützenpanzer Marder" (Rheinmetall Landsysteme / MaK - Maschinenbau Kiel)	West Germany		Second-hand: (Chile) Chilean Army (Greece) Hellenic Army (Indonesia) Indonesian Army (Jordan) Royal Jordanian Army (Ukraine) Ukrainian Ground Forces	Turret equipped with: Rheinmetall Mk 20 Rh-202 (20×139 mm); MG 3A1 (7.62×51mm NATO); 1× mount for missile launcher (MILAN, Spike LR); 1× 6 smoke grenade dispensers (76 mm)
Puma	Spz Puma "Schützenpanzer Puma" (KMW / Rheinmetall)	Germany		(Germany) German Army	RCT 30 turret (by KMW) equipped with: MK 30-2/ABM (30×173mm); H&K MG4 (5.56×45mm NATO); 2× Spike LR / LR2 (optional); MUSS 2.0 (Multifunktionales Selbstschutz-System); 2× 4 KMW MPL 76 (76 mm, launched from the back of turret)
Type 89	Type 89 (Mitsubishi)	Japan		Japan Ground Self-Defense Force	Turret equipped with: Oerlikon KDE (35×228 mm); Type 74 (7.62×51mm NATO); 2× Type 79 Jyu-MAT (1 × on each side); 2× 4 smoke grenade dispensers

=== Tracked IFV in development and prototypes ===
Chassis base	Variant	Origin	Image	Operators	Notes
ASCOD 2 "Austrian-Spanish Co-operative Development"	XM30 MICV "Mechanized Infantry Combat Vehicle" (Griffin III) (GDLS)	Spain United States	Illustration	(United States) US Army (prototype)	One of the prototypes for the replacement of the M2/M3 Bradley. Turret to be equipped with: XM913 chain gun (50×228mm); BGM-71 TOW, FGM-148 Javelin, or CCMS-H (Close Combat Missile System-Heavy), Aerovironment Switchblade; Elbit Iron Fist Light Decoupled APS
CV90 Mk IV "Combat Vehicle 90"	CV9030 CZ (BAE Systems Hägglunds with locals VOP, Excalibur Army, VR Group, Ray Service and Meopta)	Sweden Czech Republic	—	(Czech Republic) Czech Army	D-Series turret (BAE Systems AB) equipped with: Mk44S Bushmaster II (30×173mm); MAG 58C (7.62×51mm NATO) in a pod; 2× Spike LR2; Iron Fist LD (Light Decoupled); 1× 5 smoke grenade dispensers
CV90 Mk IV "Combat Vehicle 90"	CV9035 SLO (BAE Systems Hägglunds and Koval Systems)	Sweden Slovakia	—	(Slovakia) Slovak Army	D-Series turret (BAE Systems AB) equipped with: Bushmaster III (35×228 mm); MAG 58C (7.62×51mm NATO) in a pod; 2× Spike LR2; Iron Fist LD (Light Decoupled); 1× 5 smoke grenade dispensers
Niedźwiedź (Bear)	Niedźwiedź Heavy Infantry Fightig Vehicle (PGZ Group)	Poland	—	(Poland) Polish Land Forces	Vehicle being developed, planned with ZSSW-30 turret (by HSW and WB Electronics) to be equipped with: Mk44S Bushmaster II (30×173mm); UKM-2000C (7.62×51mm NATO); 2× Spike-LR; 2× 4 GAk-81 (81 mm)
KF-41 Lynx	XM30 – MICV "Mechanized Infantry Combat Vehicle" (Rheinmetall)	Germany United States	Illustration	(United States) US Army (prototype)	nie One of the prototypes for the replacement of the M2/M3 Bradley. Turret to be equipped with: XM913 chain gun (50×228mm); BGM-71 TOW, FGM-148 Javelin, or CCMS-H (Close Combat Missile System-Heavy), Raytheon Coyote UAS; Elbit Iron Fist Light Decoupled APS
Kurganets-25	Kurganets-25 (Kurganmashzavod)	Russia		(Russia) Russian Ground Forces	This is an amphibious IFV. Bumerang-BM turret equipped with: 2A42 (30×165mm); PKT (7.62×54mmR); 4× 9M133 Kornet-EM; Active APS on prototype
T-14 Armata	T-15 Barbaris (Uralvagonzavod)	Russia		(Russia) Russian Ground Forces	Two turret variants available: 1. Bumerang-BM turret variant equipped with: 2A42 (30×165mm); PKT (7.62×54mmR); 2× 9M133 Kornet-EM; Afganit kill APS with 10 hard-kill tubes; 2× 2 smoke grenade dispensers 2. DUBM-57 Dagger combat module, with the AU-220M Baikal turret variant equipped with: BM-57 (57×347mmSR); PKMT (7.62×54mmR); 2× 9M120-1 Ataka-T; Afganit kill APS with 10 hard-kill tubes; 2× 2 smoke grenade dispensers

=== Tracked IFV retired ===
Chassis base	Variant	Origin	Image	Operators	Notes
CV90 Mk I "Combat Vehicle 90"	CV9030N / CV9030NF1 (Land Systems Hagglunds)	Sweden		(Norway) Norwegian Army	All the chassis were repurposed for none-IFV variants, and the turrets reused and modernised and used on new Mk IIIb chassis. This variant is today completely retired. E30 turret (by Hägglunds Moelv AS, made under licence by Kvaerner Eureka AS) equipped with: Mk44S Bushmaster II (30×173mm); MG3 (7.62×51mm NATO); 4× 3 smoke grenade dispensers
M113 A1	Schützenpanzer 63/73 modernised to 63/89 (FMC Corporation / RUAG)	United States Switzerland		(Switzerland) Swiss Army	Turret equipped with: Hispano Suiza Kan 48/73 (NATO 25×137mm); 2× 3 Nbw 87 (Diehl / SW Thun AG) (7,6 cm); Also equipped with a 7,1 cm Lyran Le GW 74 light illumination mortar launcher.
Saurer 4K 4FA	Saurer 4K 4FA-G2 "Grenadier-Schützenpanzer" (Saurer)	Austria		(Austria) Austrian Land Forces	GAD-AOA turret (by Oerlikon Contraves) equipped with: Oerlikon Contraves Model 204 GK (20×128 mm); 4 available mounts for a MG42 (7.92×57mm Mauser); 2× 3 smoke grenade dispensers

== List of wheeled infantry fighting vehicles ==
=== Wheeled IFV in service ===
Chassis base	Variant	Origin	Image	Operators	Notes
BTR82A	BTR82A (Military Industrial Company of Russia)	Soviet Union Russia		(Azerbaijan) Azerbaijani Land Forces Belarus Army Kazakhstan Army (Russia) Russian Ground Forces (Uzbekistan) Uzbek Ground Forces	This is an amphibious IFV. Turret equipped with: Shipunov 2A72 (30×165mm); PKMT (7.62×54mmR); 2× 3 smoke grenade dispensers
Clouded Leopard	CM34 (Ordnance Readiness Development Center / Timoney Technology Limited)	Ireland Taiwan		(Taiwan) Republic of China Army	Turret (by NCSIST) equipped with: Mk44 Bushmaster II (30×173mm); Type 74 (FN MAG) (7.62×51mm NATO); Type 74 (FN MAG) (7.62×51mm NATO); 2× 6 smoke grenade dispensers
Freccia	VBM Freccia – AIFV / ATGM "Veicolo Blindato Medio Freccia – Armoured Infantry Fighting Vehicle" (CIO - Consortium Iveco - OTO Melara)	Italy		(Italy) Italian Army	Hitfist turret (by Oto Melara) equipped with: Oerlikon KBA (NATO 25×137mm); MG 42/59 (7.62×51mm NATO); optional MG 42/59 (7.62×51mm NATO); 2× Spike LR after MLU for the ATGM variant; 2× 4 Galix (80 mm)
GTK Boxer A2	Boxer Vilkas (KMW / Rheinmetall)	GermanyNetherlands		(Lithuania) Lithuanian Land Forces	Samson RT Mk.II turret (by Rafael) equipped with: Mk44S Bushmaster II (30×173mm); FN MAG (7.62×51mm NATO); 2× Spike LR; 2× 4 KMW MPL 76 (76 mm)
GTK Boxer A2 / A3	Boxer CRV (block I) (Rheinmetall)	Germany Australia		(Australia) Australian Army	LANCE turret (by Rheinmetall) equipped with: MK 30-2/ABM (30×173mm); RMG 7.62 (7.62×51mm NATO); Chassis equipped with: StrikeShield AMAP-ADS (hard kill)
GTK Boxer A3	Boxer RadSPz (PuBo) "Radschützenpanzer" (RadSPz) (KMW / Rheinmetall)	Germany Netherlands		Current users: (Qatar) Qatari Army Future users: (Germany) German Army Royal Netherlands Army (Ukraine) Ukrainian Ground Forces	RCT 30 turret (by KMW) equipped with: MK 30-2/ABM (30×173mm); H&K MG4 (5.56×45mm NATO); 2× Spike LR / LR2 (optional); 2× 4 KMW MPL 76 (76 mm, launched from the back of turret)
Iveco SuperAV	BAE ACV-30 "Amphibious Combat Vehicle" (Iveco / BAE Systems)	Italy United States		(United States) US Marine Corps	This is an amphibious IFV. Protector RT-20 (or MCT-30) turret (by Kongsberg) equipped with: Mk44 Bushmaster II (30×173mm); M240C (7.62×51mm NATO)
LAV II (licence built variant of Mowag Piranha II)	ASLAV (General Motors of Canada / GDLS - Australia)	Switzerland Canada Australia		(Australia) Australian Army	LAV-25 turret (by Delco) equipped with: M242 Bushmaster (NATO 25×137mm); FN MAG 58 (7.62×51mm NATO); 2× 4 M257 (76mm)
LAV II (licence built variant of Mowag Piranha II)	LAV-25 (also known as M1047) (General Motors of Canada)	Switzerland Canada United States		United States Marine Corps (Saudi Arabia) Saudi Arabian National Guard	This is an amphibious IFV. LAV-25 turret (by Delco) equipped with: M242 Bushmaster (NATO 25×137mm); M240C (7.62×51mm NATO); 2× 4 M257 (76mm)
LAV III (licence built variant of Mowag Piranha IIIH)	LAV III – ISC "Infantry Section Carriers" (GDLS Canada)	Switzerland Canada		(Canada) Canadian Army	LAV-25 turret (by Delco) equipped with: M242 Bushmaster (NATO 25×137mm); C6 GMPG (7.62×51mm NATO); C9A2 (5.56×45mm NATO); 2× 4 M257 (76mm)
LAV III (licence built variant of Mowag Piranha IIIH)	NZLAV – IMV "Infantry Mobility Vehicles" (GDLS Canada)	Switzerland Canada		New Zealand Army (Chile) Chilean Army (2nd hand)	LAV-25 turret (by Delco) equipped with: M242 Bushmaster (NATO 25×137mm); FN MAG 58 (7.62×51mm NATO); FN MAG 58 (7.62×51mm NATO); 2× 4 M257 (76mm)
LAV III (licence built variant of Mowag Piranha IIIH)	LAV III (GDLS Canada)	Switzerland Canada		(Colombia) Colombian Army	Samson Dual RWS turret (by Rafael) equipped with: M230 LF (30×113mm); M2A2 QCB (12.7×99mm NATO); 2× Spike ER
LAV III (licence built variant of Mowag Piranha IIIH)	LAV 6.0 – ISC "Infantry Section Carrier" (GDLS Canada)	Switzerland Canada		(Canada) Canadian Army	LAV-25 turret (by Delco) equipped with: M242 Bushmaster (NATO 25×137mm); C6 GMPG (7.62×51mm NATO); C9A2 (5.56×45mm NATO); 2× 4 M257 (76mm)
LAV III (licence built variant of Mowag Piranha IIIH)	M1296 Stryker – ICV-D "Infantry Carrier Vehicle – Dragoon" (GDLS Canada / GDLS)	Switzerland Canada United States		United States Army (Bulgaria) Bulgarian Land Forces	Protector RT-40 (or MCT-30) turret (by Kongsberg) equipped with: XM813 (30×173mm); M240C (7.62×51mm NATO); 4× 4 M257 (76mm)
Mowag Piranha IIIH	Piranha IIIH – MRV "Medium Reconnaissance Vehicle" (Mowag)	Switzerland		(Republic of Ireland) Irish Army	Hitfist 30 turret (by Oto Melara) equipped with: Mk44S Bushmaster II (30×173mm); FN MAG (7.62×51mm NATO); 2× 4 smoke grenade dispensers (66 mm)
Mowag Piranha IIIC	Piranha IIIC – DF30 "Direct Fire 30" (Mowag)	Switzerland		(Belgium) Belgian Land Component	UT-30 ORCWS turret (by Elbit) equipped with: Mk44 Bushmaster II (30×173mm); FN MAG (7.62×51mm NATO); 2× Loitering munition type; 3× 2 smoke grenade dispensers; Note: 1 Spike MR missile is transported inside of the vehicle.
Mowag Piranha IIIC	Piranha IIIC – IFV "Infantry Fighting Vehicle" (Mowag)	Switzerland	(Illustration purpose)	Botswana Ground Force	Hitfist 30 turret (by Oto Melara) equipped with: Mk44S Bushmaster II (30×173mm); FN MAG (7.62×51mm NATO); 2× 4 M257 (76mm)
Mowag Piranha V	Dragón VCR – VCI "vehículo de combate sobre ruedas – vehículo de combate infantería" (Mowag / General Dynamics Santa Bárbara Sistemas)	Switzerland Spain		(Spain) Spanish Army	Guardian 30 turret (by Escribano) equipped with: Mk44S Bushmaster II (30×173mm); Rheinmetall MG3S (7.62×51mm NATO); 2× Spike LR2 on part of the fleet; 2× 6 KMW MPL 76 (76 mm)
Mowag Piranha V	Piranha V (Mowag / Uzina Mecanica Bucuresti)	Switzerland Romania		(Romania) Romanian Land Forces	UT-30 Mk2 turret (by Elbit) equipped with: Mk44S Bushmaster II (30×173mm); (7.62×51mm NATO); 2× 3 smoke grenade dispensers
Mowag Piranha V / LAV 6.0	LAV 700 (GDLS Canada)	Switzerland Canada	—	(Saudi Arabia) Saudi Arabian National Guard	Cockerill 3000 turret (by John Cockerill) equipped with: Mk44S Bushmaster II (30×173mm); (7.62×51mm NATO); 2× CMI Bayonet ATGM launcher; 2× 4 smoke grenade dispensers
Pandur I (6×6)	Pandur I (6×6) IFV (Steyr-Daimler-Puch / AV Technology LLC)	Austria United States		Kuwait National Guard	Delco LAV-25 turret equipped with: M242 Bushmaster (NATO 25×137mm); MAG 58 (7.62×51mm NATO); 2× 4 Galix (80 mm)
Pandur II (8×8)	Pandur II 8×8 KBVP (Steyr-Daimler-Puch / Tatra Defence Vehicles)	Austria Czech Republic		(Czech Republic) Czech Army	RCWS-30 turret (by Rafael Advanced Defense Systems) equipped with: Mk44 Bushmaster II (30×173mm); M240 (7.62×51mm NATO); 2× Spike LR; 2× 4 KMW MPL 76 (76 mm)
Pandur II (8×8)	Pandur II (8×8) (Steyr-Daimler-Puch / Fabrequipa)	Austria Portugal		(Portugal) Portuguese Army	SP30 turret (by GDELS) equipped with: MK 30-2/ABM (30×173mm); MAG 58 (7.62×51mm NATO); MAG 58 (7.62×51mm NATO); 2× 4 KMW MPL 76 (76 mm)
Patria AMV	Badger IFV (Patria / Denel Land Systems)	Finland South Africa		(South Africa) South African Army	LCT-30 (by Denel) equipped with: GI-30 / EMAK 30 (30×173mm); FN MAG (7.62×51mm NATO); 2× 2 smoke grenade dispensers (81 mm)
Patria AMV	Patria AMV – BMP-3 (Patria / Rosomak SA)	Finland Poland Russia	—	United Arab Emirates Army	This is an amphibious IFV. BMP-3 turret equipped with: (Note: Gun) 2A70 (100 mm); 2A72 (30×165 mm); 7.62 mm PKT (7.62×54mmR); 3UBK10 (launched through gun); 2× 3 smoke grenade dispensers
Patria AMV	Patria AMV CRO 30L (Patria / Duro Dakovic Special Vehicles d.d.)	Finland Croatia		(Croatia) Croatian Army	UT-30 Mk2 turret (by Elbit) equipped with: Mk44S Bushmaster II (30×173mm); M240C (7.62×51mm NATO); 2× Spike LR; 2× 4 smoke grenade dispensers (rear turret, 76 mm)
Patria AMV	KTO Rosomak (Patria / Rosomak SA)	Finland Poland		(Poland) Polish Land Forces (Ukraine) Ukrainian Ground Forces	Initial variant of the Rosomak IFV, the base variant is capable of amphibious operations, the up-armoured variants (M1M) aren't. Hitfist 30P turret (by Oto Melara) equipped with: Mk44S Bushmaster II (30×173mm); UKM-2000C (7.62×51mm NATO); 6× GAk-81 (81 mm)
Patria AMV	KTO Rosomak (Patria / Rosomak SA)	Finland Poland		(Poland) Polish Land Forces	Second variant of the Rosomak IFV, ordered in 2022 and 2024. ZSSW-30 turret (by HSW and WB Electronics) equipped with: Mk44S Bushmaster II (30×173mm); UKM-2000C (7.62×51mm NATO); 2× Spike-LR; 2× 4 GAk-81 (81 mm)
VBCI "Véhicule Blindé de Combat d'Infanterie"	VBCI (Nexter)	France		(France) French Army	Tarask turret (by GIAT Industries, derived from Dragar turret) equipped with: GIAT M811 (NATO 25×137mm); MAG 58 (7.62×51mm NATO); Galix-4 (80 mm): 4 × 2 on the turret (all aiming frontwards, 2× 2 on the left side of the turret, 1× 2 on the front right, 1× 2 on the rear right); 2× 3 (at the rear of the vehicle, aiming backwards)
VBTP-MR Guarani	VBCI Guarani (Iveco, Usiminas and Villares)	Italy Brazil		(Brazil) Brazilian Army	This is an amphibious IFV. UT-30BR turret (by Elbit Systems) equipped with: Mk44S Bushmaster II (30×173mm); FN MAG (7.62×51mm NATO); 3× 2 smoke grenade dispensers (76 mm)
VBTP-MR Guarani	VBCI Guarani (Iveco, Usiminas and Villares)	Italy Brazil		(Brazil) Brazilian Army	Modernised UT-30BR2 SARC turret (by ARES) equipped with: Mk44S Bushmaster II (30×173mm); FN MAG (7.62×51mm NATO); 3× 2 smoke grenade dispensers (76 mm)

=== Wheeled IFV in development and prototypes ===
Chassis base	Variant	Origin	Image	Operators	Notes
BTR-22	BTR-22 (Military Industrial Company of Russia)	Russia	—	Potential client: (Russia) Russian Ground Forces	This is an amphibious IFV. Turret equipped with: Shipunov 2A72 (30×165mm); PKMT (7.62×54mmR); optional 2 × ATGM; optional drone jammer; 2× 3 smoke grenade dispensers
CTWV "Common tactical wheeled vehicle"	Type 24 ICV "Infantry combat vehicle'' (Mitsubishi Heavy Industries)	Japan	—	Japan Ground Self-Defense Force	Turret equipped with: Mk44S Bushmaster II (30×173mm); Mk52 Bushmaster (7.62×51mm NATO)
Freccia EVO	VBM Freccia EVO – AIFV / ATGM "Veicolo Blindato Medio Freccia Evoluzione – Armoured Infantry Fighting Vehicle" (CIO - Consortium Iveco - OTO Melara)	Italy	—	(Italy) Italian Army	Hitfist turret (by Oto Melara) equipped with: Mk44S Bushmaster II or Leonardo 30mm X-GUN (30×173mm); MG 42/59 (7.62×51mm NATO); optional MG 42/59 (7.62×51mm NATO); 2× Spike LR2 for the ATGM variant; 2× 4 Galix (80 mm)
GTK Boxer A2/A3	Boxer CRV (block II) "Schwerer Waffenträger Infanterie" (Rheinmetall)	Germany Australia		(Australia) Australian Army (Germany) German Army	LANCE 2 turret (by Rheinmetall) equipped with: MK 30-2/ABM (30×173mm); RMG 7.62 (7.62×51mm NATO); 2× Spike LR / LR2 (CRV Block 2 only); 4× 5 Rheinmetall ROSY (40 mm, CRV Block 2 only); Chassis equipped with: StrikeShield AMAP-ADS (hard kill)
K808 White Tiger	N-WAV "New Weeled Armoured Vehicle" (Hyundai Rothem)	South Korea	(base chassis)	Available on the market	This is an amphibious IFV. Turret equipped with: Mk44S Bushmaster II (30×173mm); K16 (7.62×51mm NATO); Escribano Guardian 2.0 with M2 Browning (12.7×99mm NATO); 2× ATGM (twin launcher on right turret side); KAPS (Korean APS); 2× 4 smoke grenade dispensers
Patria AMV	KTO Rosomak-L (Patria / Rosomak SA)	Finland Poland	—	(Poland) Polish Land Forces	Third variant of the Rosomak IFV, not amphibious anymore. ZSSW-30 turret (by HSW and WB Electronics) equipped with: Mk44S Bushmaster II (30×173mm); UKM-2000C (7.62×51mm NATO); 2× Spike-LR / LR2; 2× 4 GAk-81 (81 mm)
Patria AMV	BOV 8x8 Vydra (Patria / Konštrukta – Defence)	Finland Slovakia		(Slovakia) Slovak Army	This is an amphibious IFV. Turra 30 turret (by EVPÚ) equipped with: GTS-30/N (30×173mm); FN MAG (7.62×51mm NATO); 2× Spike LR2; 8 × Galix 13 / Galix 6 (80 mm)
Patria AMV	Patria AMV^{XP} (Patria / Valhalla turrets)	Finland Slovenia	—	(Slovenia) Slovenian Ground Forces	This is an amphibious IFV. Mangart 30 turret (by Valhalla turrets) equipped with: Mk44S Bushmaster II (30×173mm); FN MAG (7.62×51mm NATO); 2× Spike LR; 2× 4 KMW MPL 76 (76 mm, launched from the back of turret)
VPK-7829 Bumerang	K-17 Bumerang (Military Industrial Company of Russia / Arzamas Machine-Building Plant)	Russia		Russia	This is an amphibious IFV. Bumerang-BM turret equipped with: 2A42 (30×165mm); PKT (7.62×54mmR); 4× 9M133 Kornet-EM; 2× 2 smoke grenade dispensers

== See also ==
- Infantry fighting vehicles
- Lists of armoured fighting vehicles
- List of modern armoured fighting vehicles
- Armoured personnel carrier
- Armoured warfare
- Infantry Squad Vehicle
- Mechanized infantry
