= GIAT M811 =

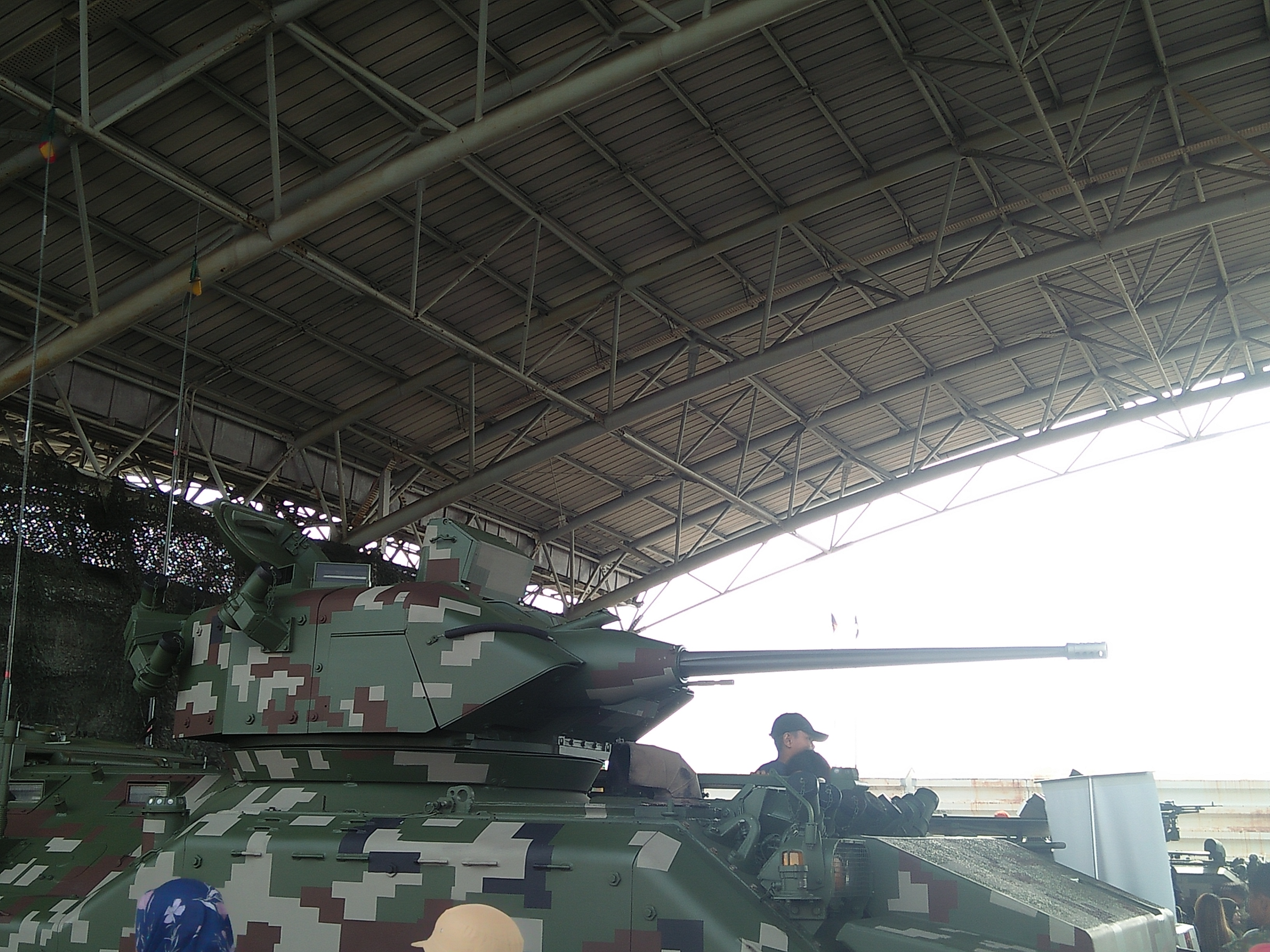
- Type: Autocannon
- Place of origin: France

Service history
- Used by: See operators

Production history
- Designer: GIAT Industries
- Manufacturer: Nexter Systems

Specifications
- Mass: 113 kg (249 lb)
- Length: 2,640 mm (104 in)
- Barrel length: 2,160 mm (85 in)
- Width: 345 mm (13.6 in)
- Height: 370 mm (15 in)
- Shell: NATO 25×137mm
- Caliber: 25 mm
- Action: Externally powered, electric drive
- Rate of fire: Low: 125 rds/min High: 400 rds/min
- Muzzle velocity: 1,360 m/s (4,500 ft/s)
- Effective firing range: 1,500 m (4,900 ft) APFSDS
- Feed system: Dual Feed

The M811 is an automatic, externally powered, single- or dual-fed autocannon firing NATO standard 25mm ammunition, designed by Nexter Systems (previously GIAT Industries).

== History ==
The M811 was first shown in June 1983. Its intended use is in an air defense or direct-fire role, mounted on either naval or land platforms, replacing existing 20 mm cannon where applicable. The Model 811 has been installed on the Nexter Vextra 8 × 8 technology demonstrator for trial purposes. The turret installation was also provisionally selected for installation on the French Army's Vehicule Blindé de Combat d'Infanterie (VBCI) 8 × 8 Infantry Fighting Vehicle (IFV).

== Description ==
Operation of the Model 811 is by an external electric motor that drives a camshaft lying inside the receiver. This shaft has a spiral cam groove that engages with a lug on the bolt, so that as the shaft revolves, the bolt is moved back and forth. The shaft is also geared to the feed mechanism, so that feed is in strict synchronization with the bolt's movements. A hang-fire safety device is provided. Fire modes are single shot, limited bursts or continuous bursts with a pre-selectable cyclic rate of fire at 125 or 400 rounds/min. The feed direction for the percussion-primed 25 × 137 ammunition can be manually or remotely selected, through an electrical feeder selection device. The first round fired following selection comes from the belt that has just been selected. The external power feature can be used for maintenance and training using dummy rounds. The Model 811 can fire all NATO standard 25×137 ammunition. Current ammunition available from Nexter Munitions includes the following; High Explosive Incendiary Tracer (HEI-T), Target Practice (TP), Target Practice Tracer (TP-T), Armour-Piercing Discarding-Sabot Tracer (APDS-T) and Armour-Piercing Fin-Stabilised Discarding-Sabot Tracer (APFSDS-T). According to Nexter Systems, the accuracy of the Model 811 25 mm is such that all rounds fired will hit a 1.5 m diameter target at a range of 1,500 m.
