= M243 smoke grenade launcher =

Grenade launcher

The M243 smoke grenade launcher is a 4-barreled 66 mm grenade launcher used on M113A2/A3 APCs and selected Humvees such as the Ground Mobility Vehicle.

The M243 primarily uses the L8A1/L8A3 round filled with red phosphorus. Upon activation, a dense cloud of white smoke is created from ground level up to a minimum height of 7 metres (23 ft) and between 20 and 50 metres (66 and 164 ft) from the vehicle in 2 to 6 seconds. The cloud lasts 1 to 3 minutes depending on wind speed and other weather conditions.

Unlike very similar grenade launchers (the M257 and M259), the M243 has a steel storage box mounted on the outside of a vehicle that stores four grenades.

== See also ==
- Ground Mobility Vehicle – (US)SOCOM program - American Special Operations Humvees that can install M243s.
