= Rheinmetall RMG 7.62 =

Tank machine gun

- RMG 7.62 on the Panther KF51-U's MSSA
- Type: Machine gun
- Place of origin: Germany

Production history
- Designed: 2013
- Manufacturer: Rheinmetall Defence

Specifications
- Cartridge: 7.62×51mm NATO
- Caliber: 7.62
- Barrels: 3
- Action: Recoil
- Rate of fire: 800 rpm
- Feed system: Belt

The Rheinmetall RMG 7.62 is a machine gun under development by Rheinmetall Defence. The weapon comes with 3 rotating barrels to reduce overheating and erosion during a firefight.

== Overview ==
The RMG 7.62 is a development of the MG3, intended as a vehicle mounted weapon where changing the overheated barrel would be a problem. Like the MG3, it is a recoil operated weapon that fires at about 800rpm and uses the belt feed from the MG3. The weapon comes with a cluster of 3 barrels that change over when overheated leaving the previously lined up barrel to cool off. The RMG 7.62 is not a rotary weapon like a minigun despite it having the appearance of one externally.

== Applications ==
The RMG 7.62 has been offered on the LANCE and LANCE 2.0 turrets as coaxial armament used on the Boxer CRV and the Lynx KF41. It also has been fitted to the remote controlled weapon station of the Panther KF51 main battle tank. So far, production versions of the LANCE and LANCE 2.0 turrets have been equipped with other types of machine guns instead.

== See also ==
- List of multiple-barrel firearms
