= AMAP-ADS =

Active protection system

Active Defence System / StrikeShield
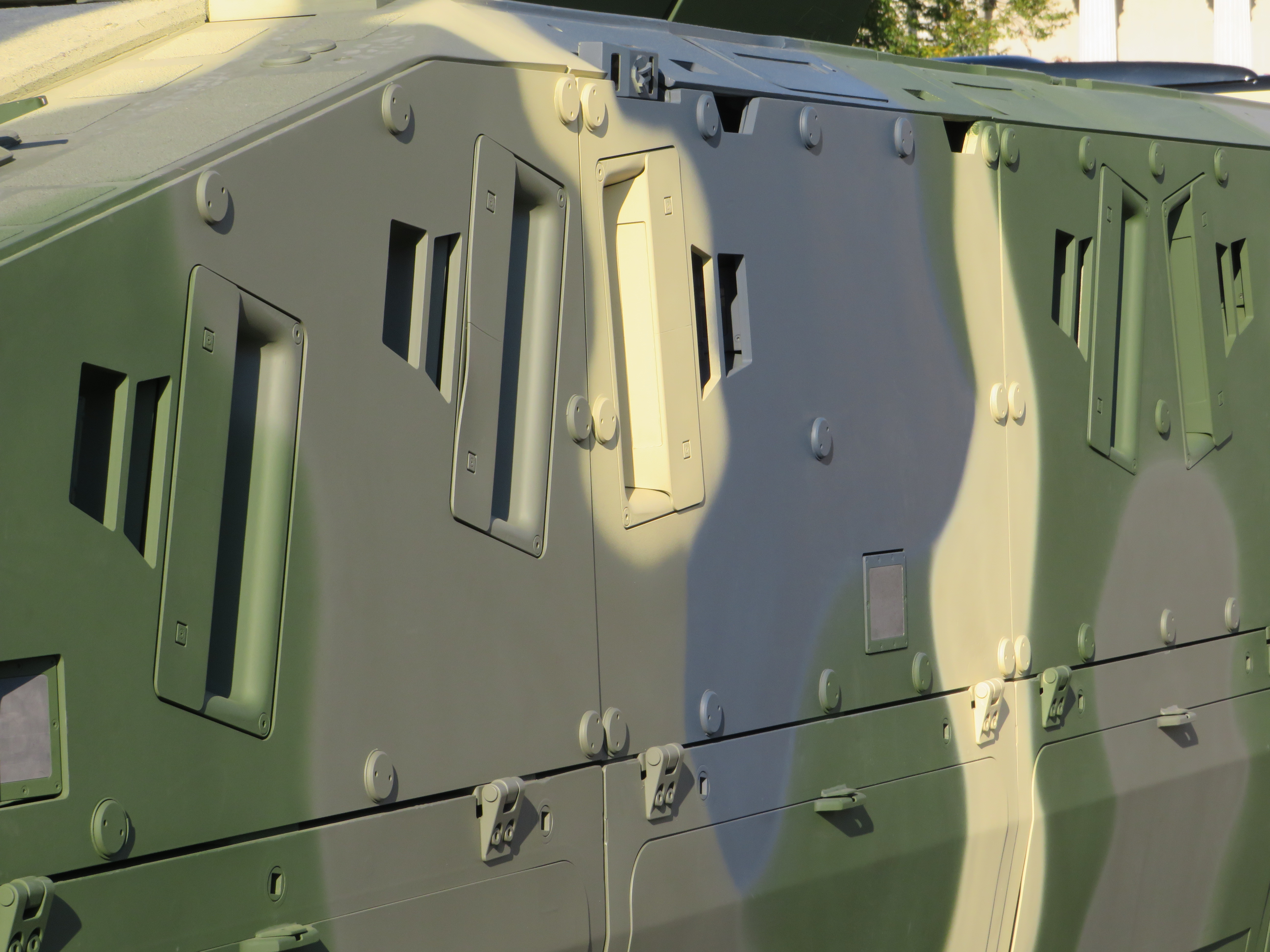
- StrikeShield APS mounted on the flanks of a Hungarian KF41 Lynx

Service history
- Used by: Hungarian Army; Singapore Army

Production history
- Designer: ADS Gesellschaft für aktive Schutzsysteme, a joint venture between Rheinmetall and IBD Deisenroth Engineering
- Designed: early 2000s
- Manufacturer: Rheinmetall Protection Systems
- Produced: since 2011
- Variants: AMAP-ADS; ADS-Gen3; StrikeShield

Specifications
- Mass: 140–500 kilograms (310–1,100 lb)

The ADS (active defence system), formerly known as AMAP-ADS, is a hard-kill active protection system (APS), developed by the German company ADS Gesellschaft für aktive Schutzsysteme, a subsidiary of Rheinmetall and IBD Deisenroth Engineering, as part of their Advanced Modular Armor Protection concept. The system was also known under the name AAC (Active Armour Concept) in Sweden and as Shark in France.

In 2019, a new version of the ADS known as the hybrid protection module was revealed, which integrates the components of the active protection system into passive spaced armour. It is marketed internationally under the name StrikeShield.

Due to its modular design, the ADS can be adapted to a broad range of vehicles and is capable of protecting light vehicles against large-calibre weapons, which light armour wouldn't stop.

== Design ==
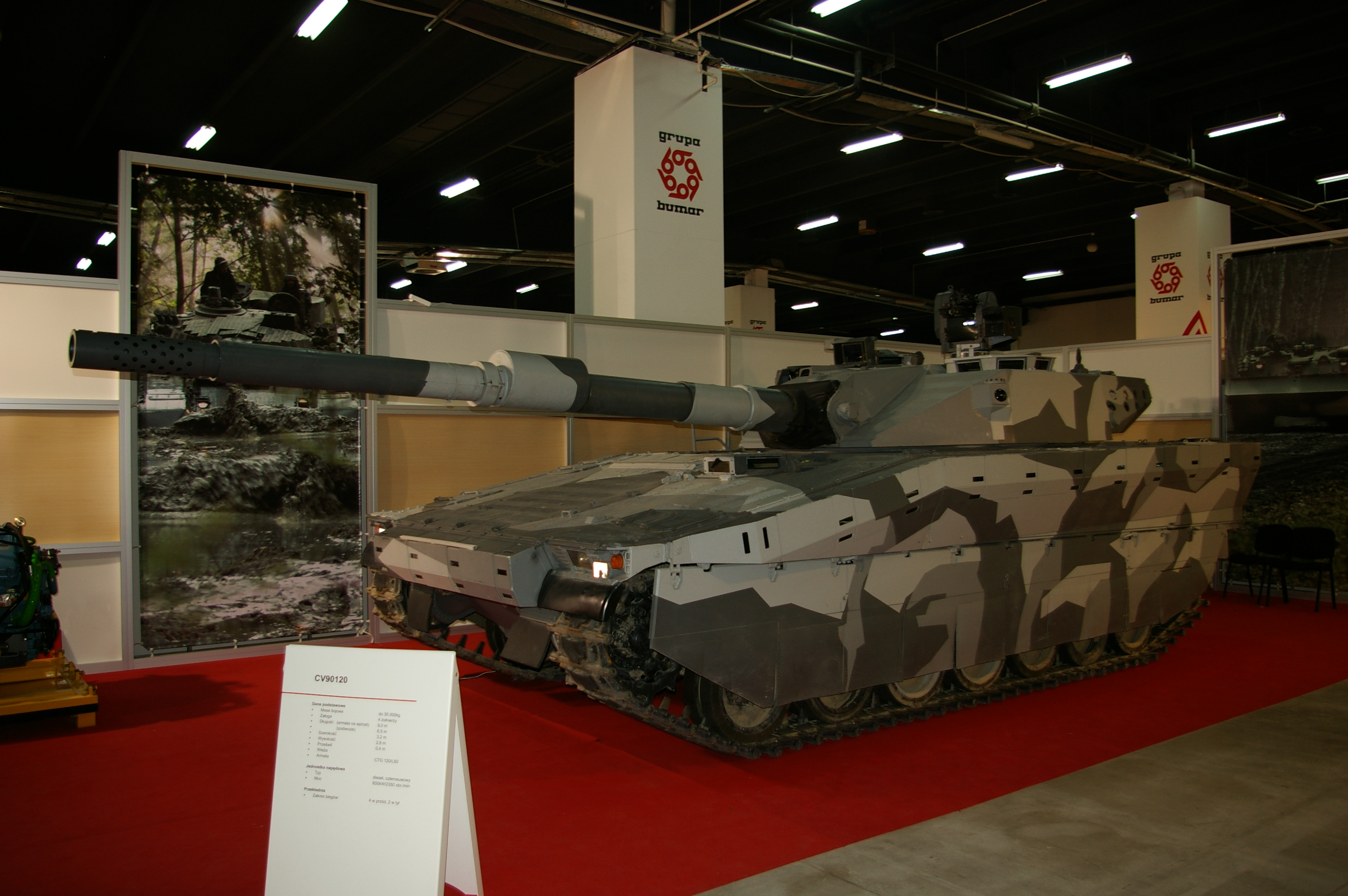
CV90120 equipped with AMAP-ADS

The ADS has a modular design that can be adapted to almost every vehicle; it weighs 140 kg for light vehicles and up to 500 kg for heavy vehicles. The main elements are the sensor-countermeasure modules arranged all around the vehicle. A processor determines the type and the trajectory of the approaching target. Subsequently, a countermeasure module close to the calculated impact point is activated. This countermeasure destroys or disrupts the approaching threat so that it cannot penetrate the vehicle.

The arrangement of sensors and countermeasures provides a hemispherical protection. The overlapping sectors of the sensor-countermeasure modules allows the system to defeat multi-hit attacks. Due to the short reaction time of approximately 560 microseconds, threats can be eliminated at ranges of approximately 10 m, not depending on the speed of the threat. AMAP-ADS is faster than Quick Kill, Iron Fist or Trophy. Since the countermeasures create a non-fragmenting stream of material, collateral damage to nearby troops or civilians is minimized. These are important aspects in urban environments. In comparison to other hard-kill systems, there are no moving parts, which makes ADS light and reduces power requirements. Therefore, it can be installed on lightweight vehicles.

The system is not intended to completely substitute for passive armour as larger calibre projectiles will only be fragmented and not entirely deflected. Therefore, passive armour is still required to absorb the residual energy of the fragments.

=== Successful demonstrations ===
AMAP-ADS was tested on several platforms. As part of the active armour concept in Sweden, it was installed in 2008 on the SEP designed by BAE Systems Hägglunds.

Threat rejection and multi-hit capability were proven in a test under urban combat conditions on 17 April, when 7.62 mm rounds and RPG-7s were fired from a short distance of some 50 m, a range typical for urban missions. In that test, the RPG projectiles were destroyed. The system also detected a 7.62 mm round but rejected it as a threat.

During live-fire demonstrations on June 30 and July 1, the ADS defeated six out of six fired ATGMs, all leaving zero residual penetration. On March 7 2018, the ADS successfully defeated three RPG-7V rounds fired at vehicles located in a simulated crowded urban marketplace, showing the system's low probability of collateral damage.

==== US tests ====
A Textron ASV vehicle was modified and equipped with the AMAP-ADS. Then it was tested for 6 weeks extensively at Redstone Arsenal in Huntsville, Alabama. These tests were overseen by the Office of the Secretary of Defense. Different types of RPGs and ATGMs were launched at various spots like the sides or the roof from close range (15 metres (49 ft)), including multi-hit attacks, in which multiple threats were used in a short period of time.

AMAP-ADS met or even exceeded all US requirements during the tests. The operability in hot climates was also proven.

=== ADS-Gen3 ===
Continuous improvements to the ADS led to the third generation of the system being revealed in 2017 under the name ADS-Gen3, which offers several key improvements over the earlier versions. Like the earlier versions, it utilizes multiple effectors and sensors distributed over the vehicle's surface. The redundancy of sensors and effectors ensures that every area is protected against at least three attacks.

The ADS-Gen3 uses newer radar sensors operating at a lower output; this reduces the radar's range to only 30 metres (98 ft) and results in the ADS-Gen3 having a significantly smaller EM signature than other hard-kill APS. The radar sensors operate in the 20 to 30 GHz waveband and have a power output of only 1 Watt. This results in the ADS-Gen3 being only detectable at ranges up to 350–400 metres (1,150–1,310 ft) by enemy ESM sensors. The shorter range of the radars also means that a higher resolution can be achieved, allowing the system to more accurately determine the type of the incoming rounds and react to staggered attacks from weapon systems such as the RPG-30. The lower EM signature reduces the probability of disruption to the electronics of nearby vehicles.

The short minimum defeat distance of the ADS-Gen3 allows intercepting projectiles launched as close as 10 metres (33 ft) to the vehicle. In case of the ADS-Gen3, the interception is claimed to be so accurate that the warhead of an incoming projectile can be defeated without setting off the fuse, resulting in less danger to nearby civilians, infantry and vehicles.

The ADS-Gen3 is the first hard-kill APS certified to the highest safety standard IEC 61508 in 2017 and was certified for ISO 61508 SIL 3 in 2018.

== StrikeShield ==
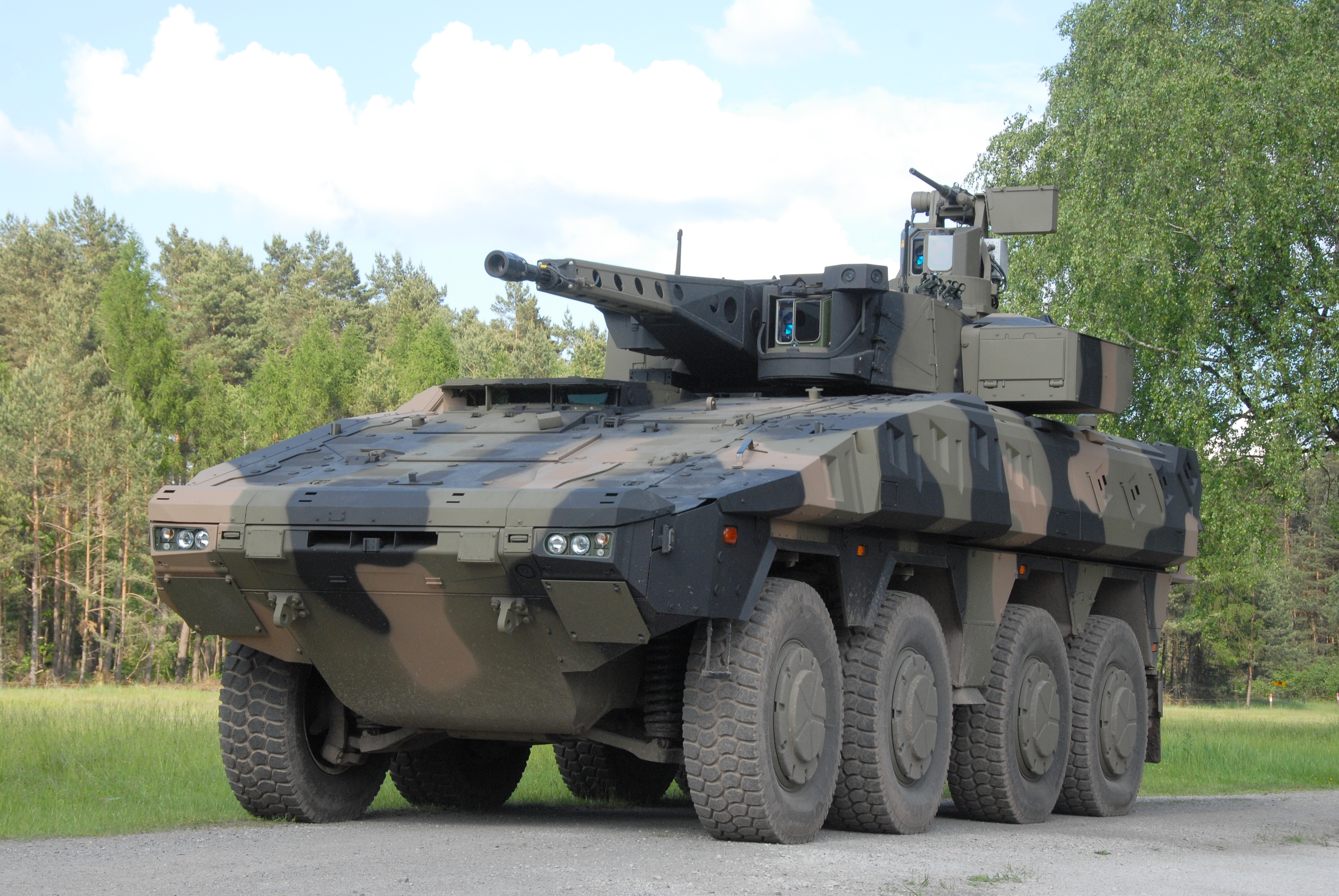
Boxer CRV fitted with a mock-up of the Strikeshield APS

At IDEX 2019, Rheinmetall presented its Hybrid Protection Module based on the ADS, which houses the components of the active protection system between two layers of spaced armour. In the original version, the outer and the inner armour plates offered ballistic protection according to STANAG 4569 Level 2 individually or ballistic protection up to STANAG 4569 Level 5 when combined. The Hybrid Protection Module can be mounted on existing interface for installing passive add-on armour and requires about 150 millimetres (5.9 in) of space. Integrating the ADS's components inside the spaced armour allows saving up to 50% of the system's weight; although as the weight of the passive armour slightly increases, the overall weight saving is only 35%.

The Hybrid Protection Module received the brand name StrikeShield in 2019 and was offered in cooperation with the US company Unified Business Technologies in the US Army's APS program for the Stryker. StrikeShield was selected as hard-kill system for the KF41 Lynx of the Hungarian Army in 2021.

In 2022, Rheinmetall presented its KF51 Panther main battle tank fitted with the StrikeShield APS along the hull to protect against ATGMs, RPGs and armour-piercing rounds such as large-calibre APFSDS ammunition. At DSEI 2023, the StrikeShield's passive armour was advertised with protection ranging from STANAG 4569 Level 3 to 6.

The ADS-Gen3 and StrikeShield can use two different types of countermeasures: a lighter effector to defeat ATGMs and RPGs and a heavier effector that generates much more energy to defeat APFSDS rounds. Tests with the StrikeShield APS were carried out in cooperation with the Bundeswehr to verify its protective performance. Two types of APFSDS ammunition were used: the 125 mm 3BM42 APFSDS and a Western 120 mm APFSDS fired from just 200 metres (660 ft) distance to simulate future threats. In photographs presented by Rheinmetall, the APFSDS projectile was tilted or broken in several pieces after interception by the StrikeShield. While the company didn't reveal performance figures, the penetration can be reduced by up to 75%, according to an unspecific source.

Like the earlier ADS versions, StrikeShield uses a Central Information Management (CIM) system to process the data from the sensors, classify the threat and engage it. On MBTs, two CIMs can be installed: one for the hull and one for the turret, if the StrikeShield APS is installed on both the turret and hull. Depending on the difficulty of the threat, more than one countermeasure can be used to intercept the threat.

== Applications ==
Prototypes of the ADS was tested on several vehicles, including the Marder, the SEP, the Combat Vehicle 90, the Patria AMV and the Iveco LMV.

In 2011, the series production of AMAP-ADS started for an Asian operator of the Leopard 2 tanks, while a number of European armies considered buying it. Over 80 systems were delivered for use on the Leopard 2A4 tank. Although Rheinmetall did not want to disclose the customer, the system was reportedly fitted to Leopard 2 tanks of Singapore Army.

The StrikeShield APS is in series production for the KF41 Lynx. It has been showcased on the KF51 Panther and the GTK Boxer.
