= Infantry fighting vehicle =

Type of armored personnel carrier with direct-fire support

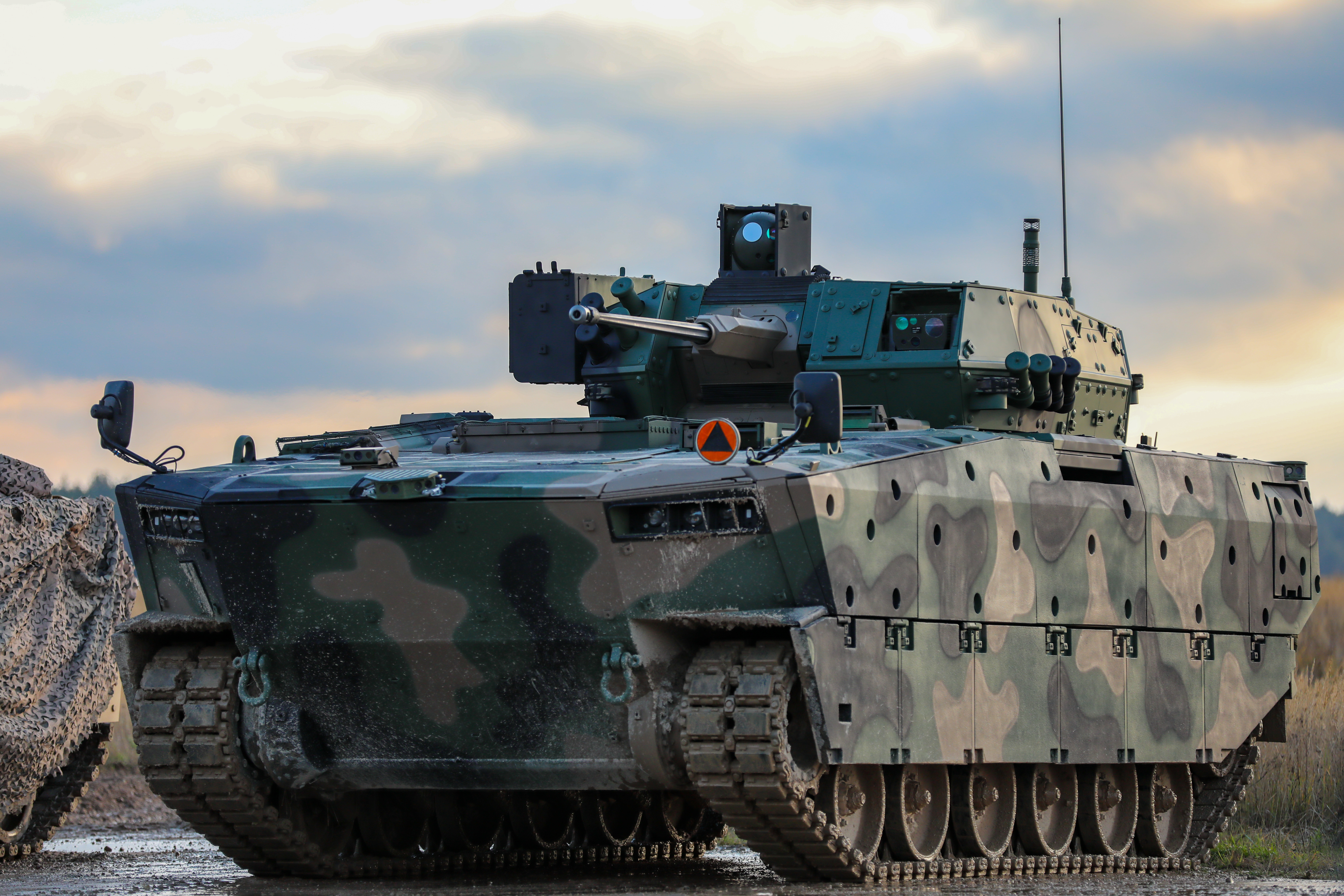
A Polish BWP Borsuk amphibious tracked infantry fighting vehicle, armed with 30mm Mk44S Bushmaster II autocannon.

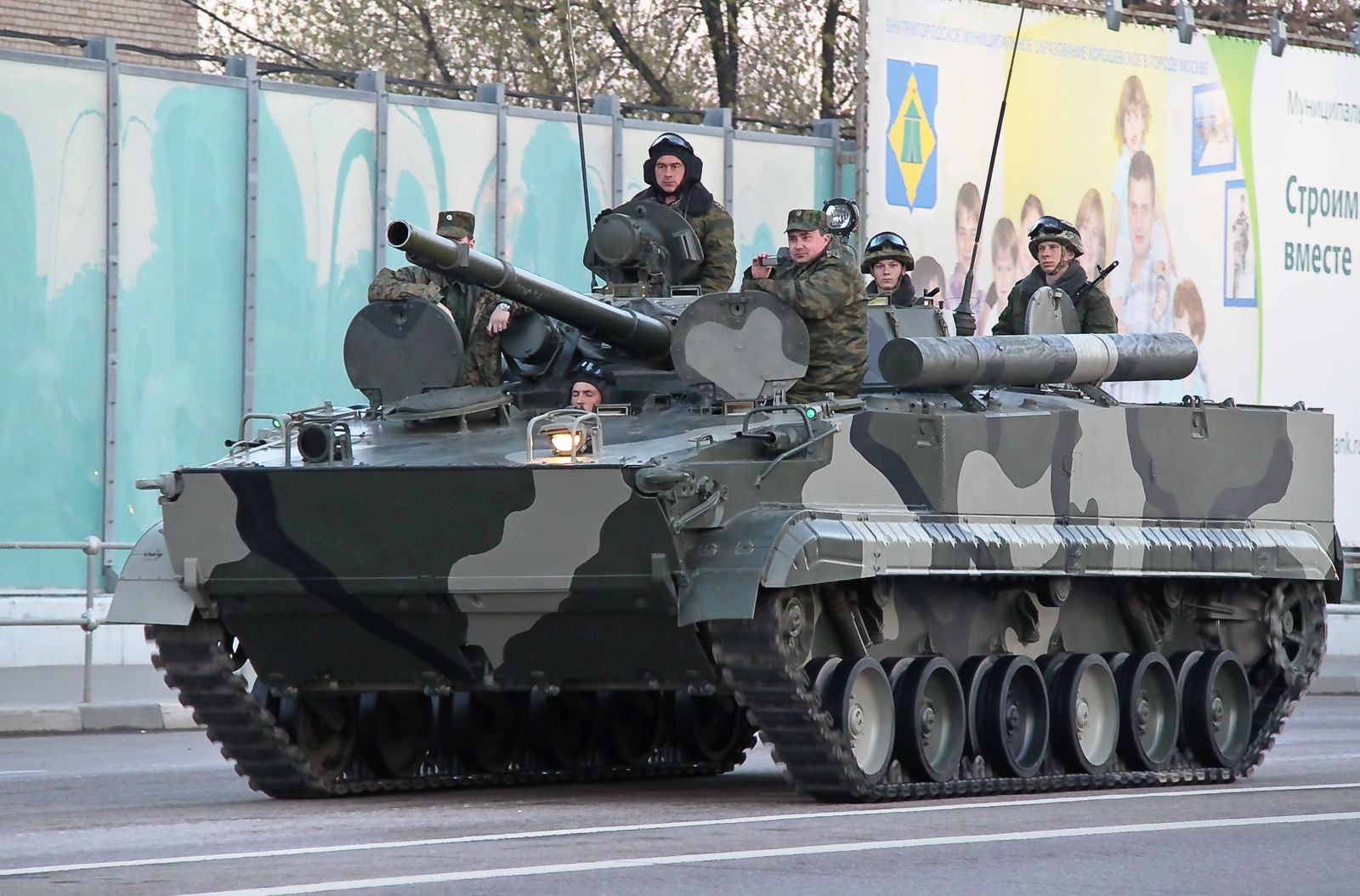
A Russian BMP-3, armed with a 2A70 100 mm low-pressure rifled cannon, with embarked infantry. The gun is capable of launching the high-explosive fragmentation projectiles, as well as the 9M117 Bastion gun-launched anti-tank guided missiles.

An infantry fighting vehicle (IFV), also known as a mechanized infantry combat vehicle (MICV), is a type of armoured fighting vehicle designed both to transport infantry into battle and to provide direct fire support, combining the function of an armoured personnel carrier (APC) with that of an assault gun/light tank. The 1990 Treaty on Conventional Armed Forces in Europe defines an infantry fighting vehicle as "an armoured combat vehicle which is designed and equipped primarily to transport a combat infantry squad, and which is armed with an integral or organic cannon of at least 20 millimeters calibre and sometimes an antitank missile launcher". IFVs often serve both as the principal weapons system and as the mode of transport for a mechanized infantry unit.

Infantry fighting vehicles are distinct from conventional APCs, which are primarily used for infantry transportation and armed only for self-defense, and not specifically engineered to fight as independent combat vehicles. IFVs are designed to be more mobile than tanks and are equipped with a rapid-firing autocannon or a conventional tank gun, often complemented by externally mounted missile launchers for anti-tank and anti-aircraft warfare; they may include side embrasures for infantrymen to fire their small arms while on board.

The IFV rapidly gained popularity with armies worldwide due to a demand for vehicles with higher firepower than APCs that were less expensive and easier to maintain than tanks. Nevertheless, it did not supersede the APC concept altogether, due to the latter's continued usefulness in specialized roles. Some armies continue to maintain fleets of both IFVs and APCs.

== History ==
=== Early Cold War ===
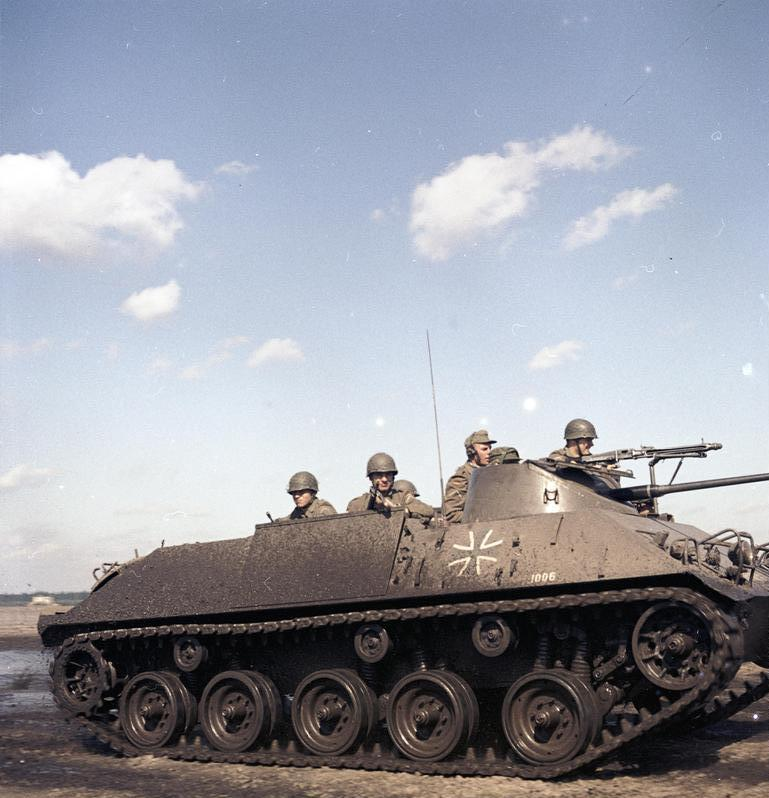
West German troops aboard a Schützenpanzer Lang HS.30, the world's first IFV. (1965)

The infantry fighting vehicle (IFV) concept evolved directly out of that of the armored personnel carrier (APC). During the Cold War, armies increasingly fitted heavier and heavier weapons systems on an APC chassis to deliver suppressive fire for infantry debussing from the vehicle's troop compartment. With the growing mechanization of infantry units worldwide, some armies also came to believe that the embarked personnel should fire their weapons from inside the protection of the APC and only fight on foot as a last resort. (Note: During the Six-Day War, for example, Syrian motorized infantry used their BTR-152 and BTR-40 APCs as firing platforms and rarely debarked to fight on foot.) These two trends led to the IFV, with firing ports in the troop compartment and a crew-operated weapons system. The IFV established a new niche between those combat vehicles which functioned primarily as armored weapons-carriers or as APCs.

During the 1950s, the Soviet, US, and most European armies had adopted tracked APCs. In 1958, however, the Federal Republic of Germany's newly organized Bundeswehr adopted the Schützenpanzer Lang HS.30 (also known simply as the SPz 12-3), which resembled a conventional tracked APC but carried a turret-mounted 20 mm autocannon that enabled it to engage other armored vehicles. The SPz 12-3 was the first purpose-built IFV.

The Bundeswehr's doctrine called for mounted infantry to fight and maneuver alongside tank formations rather than simply being ferried to the edge of the battlefield before dismounting. Each SPz 12-3 could carry five troops in addition to a three-man crew. Despite this, the design lacked firing ports, forcing the embarked infantry to expose themselves through open hatches to return fire.

As the SPz 12-3 was being inducted into service, the French and Austrian armies adopted new APCs which possessed firing ports, allowing embarked infantry to observe and fire their weapons from inside the vehicle. These were known as the AMX-VTT and Saurer 4K, respectively. Austria subsequently introduced an IFV variant of the Saurer 4K which carried a 20 mm autocannon, making it the first vehicle of this class to possess both firing ports and a turreted weapons-system. The French military introduced improved versions of the AMX-VTT, designated as AMX-VCI (VCI for Véhicule de Combat d'Infanterie, literally Infantry Fighting Vehicle) with heavier armament during the 1960s..

In the early to mid-1960s, the Swedish Army adopted two IFVs armed with 20 mm autocannon turrets and roof firing hatches: Pansarbandvagn 301 and Pansarbandvagn 302, having experimented with the IFV concept already during WWII in the Terrängbil m/42 KP wheeled machine gun armed proto-IFV. Following the trend towards converting preexisting APCs into IFVs, the Dutch, US, and Belgian armies experimented with a variety of modified M113s during the late 1960s; these were collectively identified as the AIFV (Armored Infantry Fighting Vehicle).

The first US M113-based IFV appeared in 1969; known as the XM765, it had a sharply angled hull, ten vision blocks, and a cupola-mounted 20 mm autocannon. The XM765 design, though rejected for service, later became the basis for the very similar Dutch YPR-765. The YPR-765 had five firing ports and a 25 mm autocannon with a co-axial machine gun.

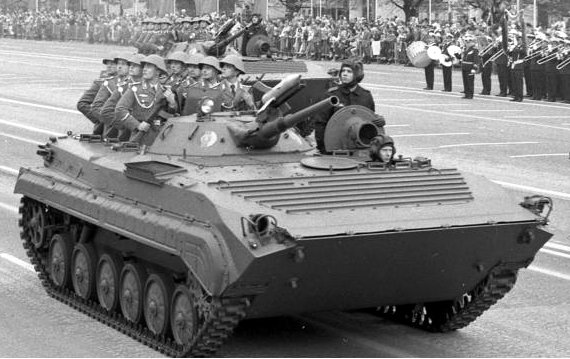
An East German BMP-1 with eight passengers (1988)

The Soviet Ground Forces fielded its first tracked APC, the BTR-50, in 1957. Its first wheeled APC, the BTR-152, had been designed as early as the late 1940s. Early versions of both these lightly armored vehicles were open-topped and carried only general-purpose machine guns for armament. As Soviet strategists became more preoccupied with the possibility of a war involving weapons of mass destruction, they became convinced of the need to deliver mounted troops to a battlefield without exposing them to the radioactive fallout from an atomic weapon. The IFV concept was received favorably because it would enable a Soviet infantry squad to fight from inside their vehicles when operating in contaminated environments. Soviet design work on a new tracked IFV began in the late 1950s and the first prototype appeared as the Obyekt 765 in 1961. After evaluating and rejecting a number of other wheeled and tracked prototypes, the Ground Forces accepted the Obyekt 765 for service. It entered serial production as the BMP-1 in 1966.

The BMP-1 was heavily armed and armored, combining the qualities of a light tank with those of the traditional APC. In addition to being amphibious and superior in cross-country mobility to its predecessors, the BMP-1 carried a 73mm smoothbore cannon, a co-axial PKT machine gun, and a launcher for 9M14 Malyutka anti-tank missiles. Its hull had sufficiently heavy armor to resist .50 caliber armor-piercing ammunition along its frontal arc. Eight firing ports and vision blocks allowed the embarked infantry squad to observe and engage targets with rifles or machine guns. The BMP-1's use of a relatively large caliber main gun marked a departure from the Western trend of fitting IFVs with automatic cannon, which were more suitable for engaging low-flying aircraft, light armor, and dismounted personnel.

The Soviet Union produced about 20,000 BMP-1s from 1966 to 1983, at which time it was considered the most widely adopted IFV design in the world. In Soviet service, the BMP-1 was ultimately superseded by the more sophisticated BMP-2 (in service from 1980) and by the BMP-3 (in service from 1987). A similar vehicle known as the BMD-1 was designed to accompany Soviet airborne infantry and for a number of years was the world's only airborne IFV- however, it had no infantry carrying compartment and was only intended to provide IFV firepower to airborne troops.

In 1971 the Bundeswehr adopted the Marder, which became increasingly heavily armored through its successive marks and – like the BMP – was later fitted as standard with a launcher for anti-tank guided missiles. Between 1973 and 1975 the French and Yugoslav armies developed the AMX-10P and BVP M-80, respectively – the first amphibious IFVs to appear outside the Soviet Union. The Marder, AMX-10P, and M-80 were all armed with similar 20 mm autocannon and carried seven to eight passengers. They could also be armed with various anti-tank missile configurations.

=== Late Cold War ===
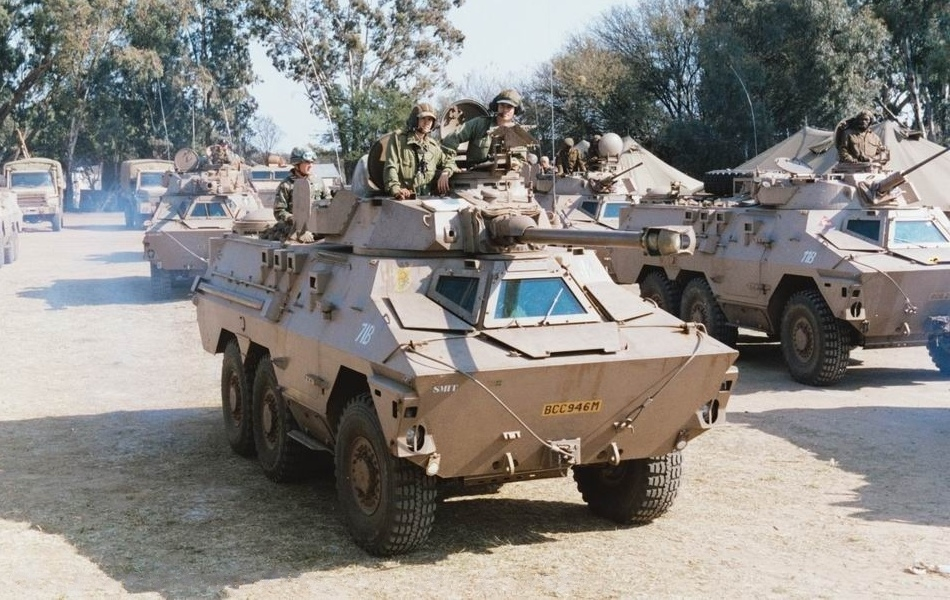
The Ratel, the first wheeled IFV, introduced a number of novel features, such as a mine-protected hull.

Wheeled IFVs did not begin appearing until 1976, when the Ratel was introduced in response to a South African Army specification for a wheeled combat vehicle suited to the demands of rapid offensives combining maximum firepower and strategic mobility. Unlike European IFVs, the Ratel was not designed to allow mounted infantrymen to fight in concert with tanks but rather to operate independently across vast distances. South African officials chose a very simple, economical design because it helped reduce the significant logistical commitment necessary to keep heavier combat vehicles operational in undeveloped areas. Excessive track wear was also an issue in the region's abrasive, sandy terrain, making the Ratel's wheeled configuration more attractive. The Ratel was typically armed with a 20 mm autocannon featuring what was then a unique twin-linked ammunition feed, allowing its gunner to rapidly switch between armor-piercing and high-explosive ammunition. Other variants were also fitted with mortars, a bank of anti-tank guided missiles, or a 90 mm cannon. Most notably, the Ratel was the first mine-protected IFV; it had a blastproof hull and was built to withstand the explosive force of anti-tank mines favored by local insurgents.

Like the BMP-1, the Ratel proved to be a watershed in IFV development, albeit for different reasons: until its debut wheeled IFV designs were evaluated unfavorably, since they lacked the weight-carrying capacity and off-road mobility of tracked vehicles, and their wheels were more vulnerable to hostile fire. However, improvements during the 1970s in power trains, suspension technology, and tires had increased their potential strategic mobility. Reduced production, operation, and maintenance costs also helped make wheeled IFVs attractive to several nations.

During the late 1960s and early 1970s, the United States Army had gradually abandoned its attempts to utilize the M113 as an IFV and refocused on creating a dedicated IFV design able to match the BMP. Although considered reliable, the M113 chassis did not meet the necessary requirements for protection or stealth. The US also considered the M113 too heavy and slow to serve as an IFV capable of keeping pace with tanks. Its MICV-65 program produced a number of unique prototypes, none of which were accepted for service owing to concerns about speed, armor protection, and weight. US Army evaluation staff were sent to Europe to review the AMX-10P and the Marder, both of which were rejected due to high cost, insufficient armor, or lackluster amphibious capabilities.

In 1973, the FMC Corporation developed and tested the XM723, which was a 21-ton tracked chassis which could accommodate three crew members and eight passengers. It initially carried a single 20 mm autocannon in a one-man turret but in 1976 a two-man turret was introduced; this carried a 25 mm autocannon like M242 or Oerlikon KBA, a co-axial machine gun, and a TOW anti-tank missile launcher. The XM723 possessed amphibious capability, nine firing ports, and spaced laminate armor on its hull. It was accepted for service with the US Army in 1980 as the Bradley Fighting Vehicle. Successive variants have been retrofitted with improved missile systems, gas particulate filter systems, Kevlar spall liners, and increased stowage. The amount of space taken up by the hull and stowage modifications has reduced the number of passengers to six.

By 1982 30,000 IFVs had entered service worldwide, and the IFV concept appeared in the doctrines of 30 national armies. The popularity of the IFV was increased by the growing trend on the part of many nations to mechanize armies previously dominated by light infantry. However, contrary to expectation the IFV did not render APCs obsolete. The US, Russian, French, and German armies have all retained large fleets of IFVs and APCs, finding the APC more suitable for multi-purpose or auxiliary roles.

The British Army was one of the few Western armies which had neither recognized a niche for IFVs nor adopted a dedicated IFV design by the late 1970s. In 1980, it made the decision to adopt a new tracked armored vehicle, the FV510 Warrior. British doctrine is that a vehicle should carry troops under protection to the objective and then give firepower support when they have disembarked. While normally classified as an IFV, the Warrior fills the role of an APC in British service and infantrymen do not remain embarked during combat.

== Doctrine ==
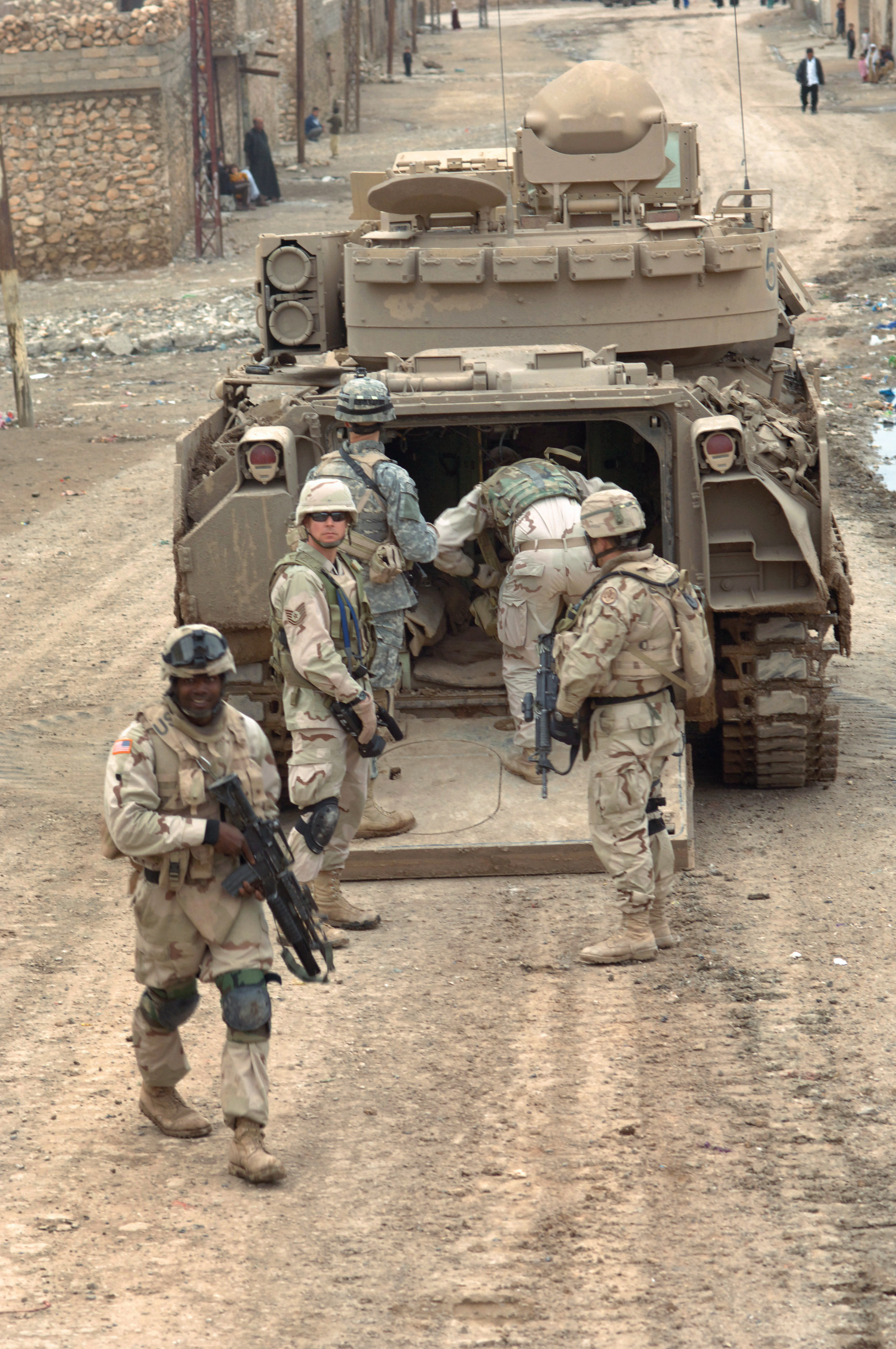
Soldiers from the 3rd Armored Cavalry Regiment load into the rear of an M2 Bradley in Iraq.

The role of the IFV is closely linked to mechanized infantry doctrine. While some IFVs are armed with a direct fire gun or anti-tank guided missiles for close infantry support, they are not intended to assault armored and mechanized forces with any type of infantry on their own, mounted or not. Rather, the IFV's role is to give an infantry unit battlefield, tactical, and operational mobility during combined arms operations.

Most IFVs either complement tanks as part of an armored battalion, brigade, or division. Others perform traditional infantry missions supported by tanks. Early development of IFVs in a number of Western nations was promoted primarily by armor officers who wanted to integrate tanks with supporting infantry in armored divisions. There were a few exceptions to the rule: for example, the Bundeswehr's decision to adopt the SPz 12-3 was largely due to the experiences of Wehrmacht panzergrenadiers who had been inappropriately ordered to undertake combat operations better suited for armor. Hence, the Bundeswehr concluded that infantry should only fight while mounted in their own armored vehicles, ideally supported by tanks. This doctrinal trend was later subsumed into the armies of other Western nations, including the US, leading to the widespread conclusion that IFVs should be confined largely to assisting the forward momentum of tanks.

The Soviets were more doctrinally flexible, allowing mechanized infantry to occupy terrain that compromised an enemy defense, carry out flanking movements, or lure armor into ill-advised counterattacks. While they still performed an auxiliary role to tanks, the notion of using IFVs in these types of engagements dictated that they be heavily armed, which was reflected in the BMP-1 and its successors. Additionally, Soviet Airborne Forces doctrine made use of the BMD series of IFVs to operate in concert with paratroops rather than traditional mechanized or armored formations.

IFVs assumed a new significance after the 1973 Arab-Israeli War. In addition to heralding the combat debut of the BMP-1, that conflict demonstrated the newfound significance of anti-tank guided missiles and the obsolescence of independent armored attacks. More emphasis was placed on combined arms offensives, and the importance of mechanized infantry to support tanks reemerged.

As a result of the 1973 Arab-Israeli War, the Soviet Union attached more infantry to its armored formations and the US accelerated its long-delayed IFV development program. An IFV capable of accompanying tanks for the purpose of suppressing anti-tank weapons and the hostile infantry which operated them was seen as necessary to avoid the devastation wreaked on purely armored Israeli formations.

== Design ==
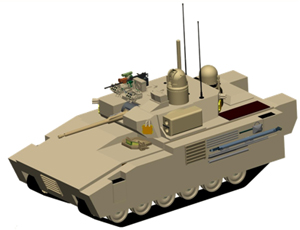
A typical configuration of a tracked infantry fighting vehicle

The US Army defines all vehicles classed as IFVs as having three essential characteristics: they are armed with at least a medium-caliber cannon or automatic grenade launcher, at least sufficiently protected against small arms fire, and possess off-road mobility. It also identifies all IFVs as having some characteristics of an APC and a light tank.

The United Nations Register for Conventional Arms (UNROCA) simply defines an IFV as any armored vehicle "designed to fight with soldiers on board" and "to accompany tanks". UNROCA makes a clear distinction between IFVs and APCs, as the former's primary mission is combat rather than general transport.

=== Protection ===
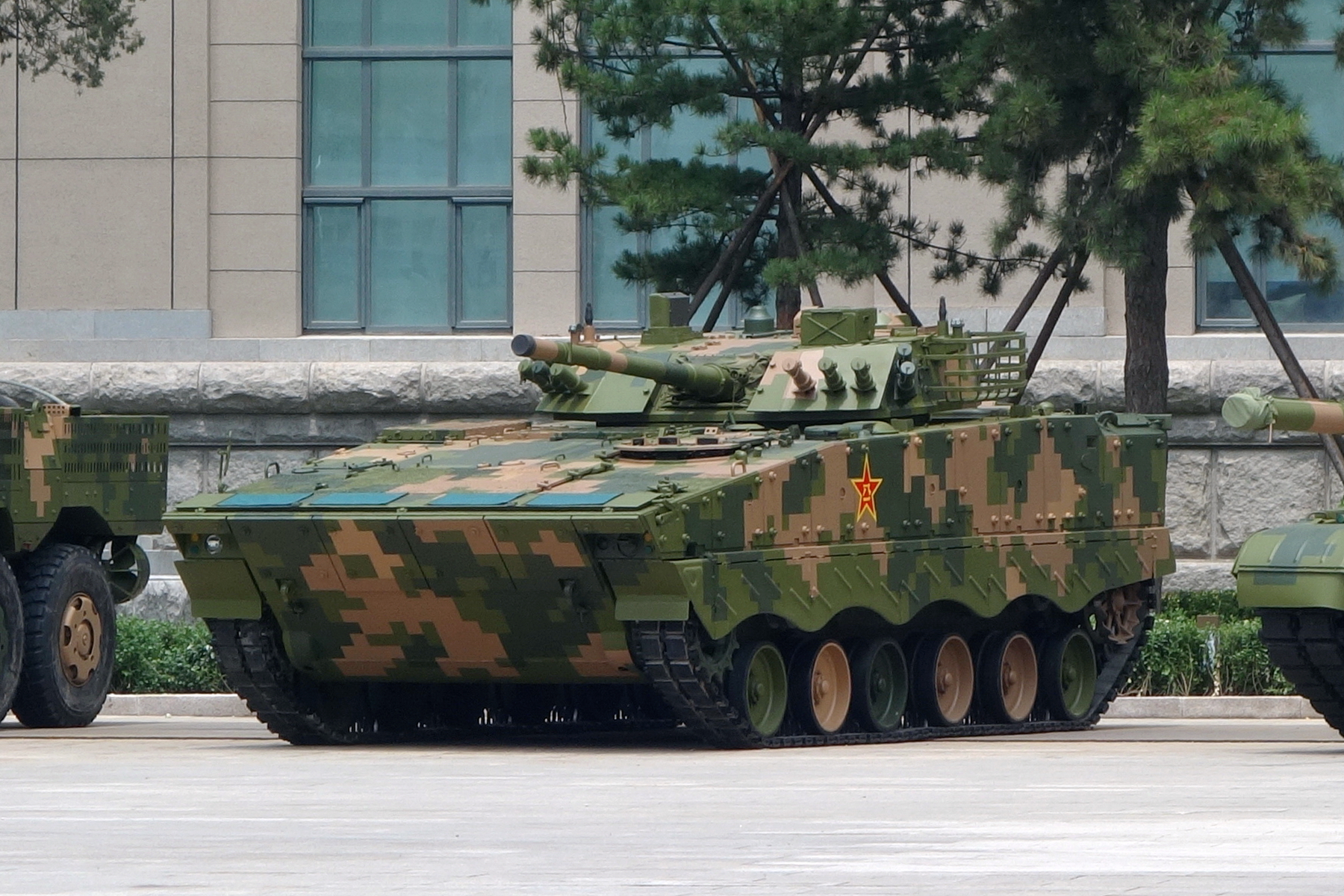
Chinese ZBD-04A infantry fighting vehicle

All IFVs possess armored hulls protected against rifle and machine gun fire, and some are equipped with active protection systems. Most have lighter armor than main battle tanks to ensure mobility. Armies have generally accepted risk in reduced protection to recapitalize on an IFV's mobility, weight and speed. Their fully enclosed hulls offer protection from artillery fragments and residual environmental contaminants as well as limit exposure time to the mounted infantry during extended movements over open ground.

Many IFVs also have sharply angled hulls that offer a relatively high degree of protection for their armor thickness. The BMP, Boragh, BVP M-80, and their respective variants all possess steel hulls with a distribution of armor and steep angling that protect them during frontal advances. The BMP-1 was vulnerable to heavy machine guns at close range on its flanks or rear, leading to a variety of more heavily armored marks appearing from 1979 onward.

The Bradley possessed a lightweight aluminum alloy hull, which in most successive marks has been bolstered by the addition of explosive reactive and slat armor, spaced laminate belts, and steel track skirts. Throughout its life cycle, an IFV is expected to gain 30% more weight from armor additions.

As asymmetric conflicts become more common, an increasing concern with regards to IFV protection has been adequate countermeasures against land mines and improvised explosive devices. During the Iraq War, inadequate mine protection in US Bradleys forced their crews to resort to makeshift strategies such as lining the hull floors with sandbags. A few IFVs, such as the Ratel, have been specifically engineered to resist mine explosions.

=== Armament ===
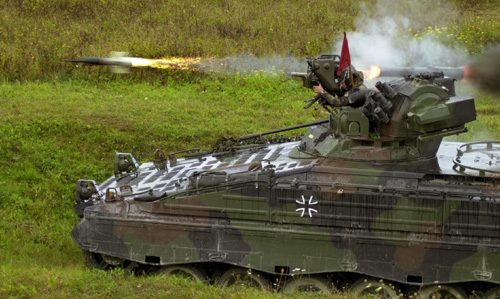
A Marder fires a MILAN anti-tank missile.

IFVs may be equipped with: turrets carrying autocannons of various calibers, low or medium velocity tank guns, anti-tank guided missiles, or automatic grenade launchers.

With a few exceptions, such as the BMP-1 and the BMP-3, designs such as the Marder and the BMP-2 have set the trend of arming IFVs with an autocannon suitable for use against lightly armored vehicles, low-flying aircraft, and dismounted infantry. This reflected the growing inclination to view IFVs as auxiliaries of armored formations: a small or medium caliber autocannon was perceived as an ideal suppressive weapon to complement large caliber tank fire. IFVs armed with miniature tank guns did not prove popular because many of the roles they were expected to perform were better performed by accompanying tanks.

The BMP-1, which was the first IFV to carry a relatively large cannon, came under criticism during the 1973 Arab-Israeli War for its mediocre individual accuracy, due in part to the low velocities of its projectiles. During the Soviet–Afghan War, BMP-1 crews also complained that their armament lacked the elevation necessary to engage insurgents in mountainous terrain. The effectiveness of large caliber, low-velocity guns like the 2A28 Grom on the BMP-1 and BMD-1 was also much reduced by the appearance of Chobham armor on Western tanks.

The Ratel, which included a variant armed with a 90mm low-velocity gun, was utilized in South African combat operations against Angolan and Cuban armored formations during the South African Border War, with mixed results. Although the Ratels succeeded in destroying a large number of Angolan tanks and APCs, they were hampered by many of the same problems as the BMP-1: mediocre standoff ranges, inferior fire control, and a lack of stabilized main gun. The Ratels' heavy armament also tempted South African commanders to utilize them as light tanks rather than in their intended role of infantry support.

Another design feature of the BMP-1 did prove more successful in establishing a precedent for future IFVs: its inclusion of an anti-tank missile system. This consisted of a rail-launcher firing 9M14 Malyutka missiles which had to be reloaded manually from outside the BMP's turret. Crew members had to expose themselves to enemy fire to reload the missiles, and they could not guide them effectively from inside the confines of the turret space.

The BMP-2 and later variants of the BMP-1 made use of semiautonomous guided missile systems. In 1978, the Bundeswehr became the first Western army to embrace this trend when it retrofitted all its Marders with launchers for MILAN anti-tank missiles.

The US Army added a launcher for TOW anti-tank missiles to its fleet of Bradleys, despite the fact that this greatly reduced the interior space available for seating the embarked infantry. This was justified on the basis that the Bradley needed to not only engage and destroy other IFVs, but support tanks in the destruction of other tanks during combined arms operations.

=== Mobility ===
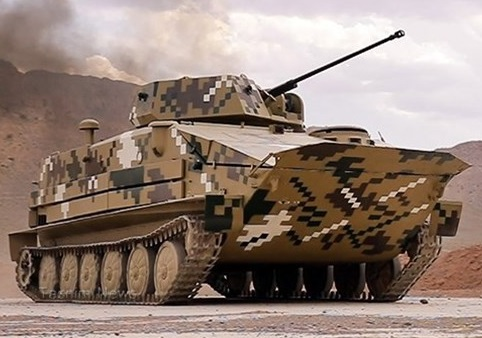
Iranian Makran IFV

IFVs are designed to have the strategic and tactical mobility necessary to keep pace with tanks during rapid maneuvers. Some, like the BMD series, have airborne and amphibious capabilities. IFVs may be either wheeled or tracked; tracked IFVs are usually more heavily armored and possess greater carrying capacity. Wheeled IFVs are cheaper and simpler to produce, maintain, and operate. From a logistical perspective, they are also ideal for an army without widespread access to transporters or a developed rail network to deploy its armor.

== See also ==
- List of infantry fighting vehicles
- Armored car (military)
- Armoured personnel carrier
- Armoured warfare
- BMP development
- Improvised fighting vehicle
- Infantry Squad Vehicle
- List of modern armoured fighting vehicles
- Lists of armoured fighting vehicles
- Mechanized infantry
- Motorized infantry
- Tank desant
- High Survivability Test Vehicle (Lightweight)
- Landsverk L-60
