= BSCC =

BSCC may refer to:

- Bay State Correctional Center, a defunct small, general population medium security facility in Norfolk, Massachusetts
- Bevill State Community College, a public community college in Sumiton, Alabama
- Big Spring Correctional Center, a privately operated prison in Big Spring, Howard County, Texas
- Bishop State Community College, a public, historically black community college in Alabama
- The British-Swiss Chamber of Commerce, an independent not-for-profit organisation
