= Andrew Cook (businessman) =

British industrialist and author (born 1949)

Sir Andrew Cook
- Born: 1949 (age 76–77); Sheffield, UK
- Citizenship: British
- Education: High Storrs Grammar School; University College London (law)
- Occupations: Industrialist; Author; Historian
- Years active: 1981–present
- Known for: Chairman of William Cook Holdings Limited
- Board member of: President, British-Swiss Chamber of Commerce
- Spouse: Lady Mirela Dracini-Cook
- Honours: CBE (1996); Knight Bachelor (2016)

Sir Andrew Cook CBE (born October 1949) is a British industrialist, philanthropist, historian, and author. He is the owner and chairman of William Cook Holdings Limited, one of Europe's leading steel and engineering groups.

== Early life and education ==
Cook was born in Sheffield in 1949 and attended High Storrs Grammar School and University College London, where he studied law. He graduated in 1971 and was called to the Bar at Gray's Inn in 1972. Having completed a short pupillage and a technical apprenticeship, he joined the former family firm William Cook & Sons.

== Career ==
In 1981 Cook became chairman of William Cook and began a period of rapid expansion and refocusing on new markets. By 1986, sales exceeded £10million and, following a series of acquisitions, in 1991 they had grown to £120 million. In 1997, he defeated a hostile takeover bid from the now defunct industrial conglomerate Triplex Lloyd and took William Cook into private ownership with the aid of the venture capitalist Electra Investment trust.

In 2004 he bought out Electra Investment Trust, restoring the company to 100% family control for the first time in 50 years. Since 2004, Cook has consolidated his company's manufacturing activities in four factories in Sheffield, Leeds, and Stanhope. In 2011, the William Cook group employed approximately 600 people and had annual sales in the region of £60million.

== Awards and recognition ==
In 1989 Cook was elected the CBI "Company of the Year". In 1991, the UK Monopolies Commission commended Cook for his perception in producing lasting solutions to the industry's chronic structural problems.

In 1996 Cook was made a Commander of the Most Excellent Order of the British Empire (CBE) by Her Majesty the Queen, in the New Year's Honours List, for services to the steel casting industry.

In 2008 Cook was awarded the E J Fox medal by the Institute of Cast Metals Engineers.

Also in 2008, Cook was named 82nd in the Telegraph's Top 1,000 British Business People.

In 2015 Cook and his family were named joint 52nd in the Yorkshire Rich List, with a stated £80m wealth.

In 2016 he was knighted in David Cameron's Resignation Honours List.

In July 2020 Sir Andrew was elected President of the British-Swiss Chamber of Commerce in its centenary year. On election, Sir Andrew said he would do everything in his power to serve British and Swiss business and boost bilateral trade.

== Philanthropic activities ==
Cook's recent donations include £1.5million to Corpus Christi College, Cambridge, £300,000 to University College, London, of which he is an alumnus, and £250,000 to the South Yorkshire Community Foundation. Cook has also donated significant sums to the Peppercorn A1 locomotive trust to get A1 class "Tornado" into running order. Cook also makes annual donations totalling approximately £50,000 to various children's, homeless, medical and welfare charities, including the Centre for Social Justice.

== Political activities ==
Cook is a major Conservative Party supporter and donor. Since restoring his company to 100% family control in 2004, he has donated substantially and frequently to the party. His donations total in the region of £2.5million.

He was the principal funder of the "Conservatives IN" referendum campaign and to which he donated in excess of £300,000.

He is a climate-change denier, claiming that man made climate change is a "false or distorted belief." Describing climate change as a "nefarious means of indoctrination" resulting from intolerance and ignorance he wrote: "Yes, average temperatures are rising, but whether this is man made or natural is not proven.”

== Economics activities ==
In November 2014 Cook took part in a public debate on devaluation, hosted at the Judge Business School in Cambridge, arguing against devaluation as a means of restoring the UK's manufacturing sector. His opponent was the businessman John Mills, founder of the Pound Campaign and an advocate for devaluation. A vote from the audience at the conclusion of the debate confirmed that Cook had won the debate, with 79% of audience members voting in support of his argument. Cook is occasionally called upon by the national press to comment on economic crises and situations.

== Literary career ==
Cook's first book Thrice Through the Fire, published in 1999, was a history of the William Cook company from 1985 to 1998 and to Philip Hansen's book, The History of the William Cook Company and the Cook Family. Thrice Through the Fire was written after a thirteen-year period of exponential growth for the company, seeing it become the world leader in steel castings, thanks to Cook's successful "re-launch" of the company soon after he became chairman in 1981.

In 2008, concerned that there would be an energy crisis in the following decade and "on the Conservative watch" as he described it, Cook financed and co-wrote with Professor Ian Fells CBE A Pragmatic Energy Policy for the UK. Following a private launch to Charles Hendry, then shadow energy secretary, the publication was launched nationally at the Royal Institution.

Cook's second and third books were published in 2011. Ashes and Dust is a book of recollections and reflections, events and experiences, from various times to 2011. Coal, Steam and Comfort – 141R568 and the Swiss Classic Train is an account of a train restoration project he had undertaken over the 5-year period 2005 to 2010. In 2015, he published his fourth book, The Doctors of Ulm and other stories.
