= Lynx (Rheinmetall armoured fighting vehicle) =

German armored fighting vehicle

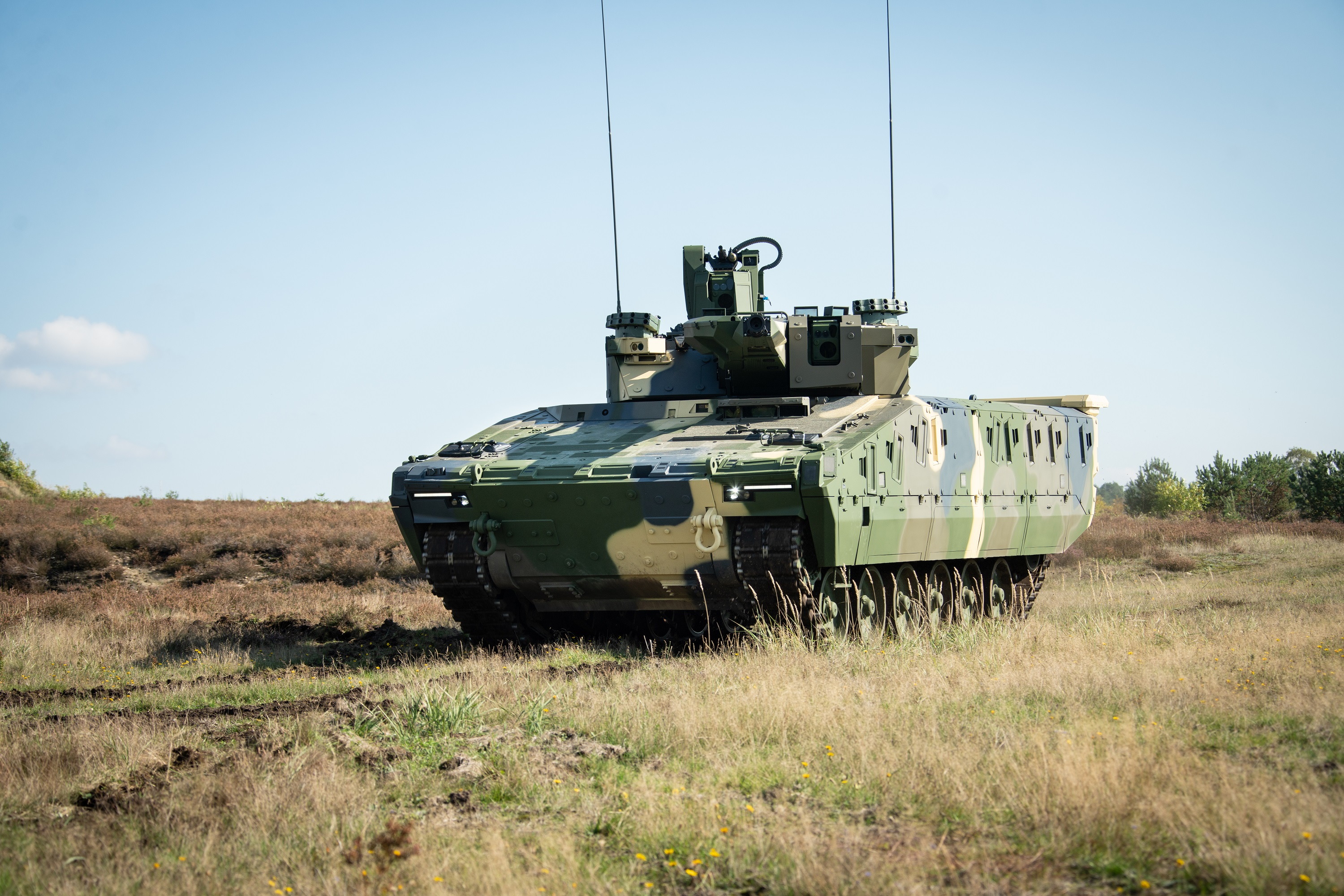
- The first ever serial-production Lynx KF41 wearing the colours of the Hungarian Army
- Place of origin: Germany

Service history
- Used by: See Operators

Production history
- Designer: Rheinmetall Landsysteme GmbH
- Designed: 2015
- Manufacturer: Rheinmetall Landsysteme GmbH (Germany): 2021 - present; JV Rheinmetall Hungary Zrt. Hungarian State (51 / 49%): 2023 - present; LRMV (Leonardo Rheinmetall Military Vehicles): planned for 2026; Rheinmetall Automecanica SRL (Romania): planned for 2027
- Variants: See variants

The Lynx is a German armoured fighting vehicle developed by Rheinmetall. The Lynx, configured as a KF31 infantry fighting vehicle (IFV), was unveiled at the Eurosatory defence exhibition on 14 June 2016. The KF41 variant was unveiled at the Eurosatory defence exhibition on 12 June 2018.

According to Rheinmetall, the Lynx family of tracked armoured vehicles is at the forefront of a new trend in IFV design toward armoured vehicles with lower unit and through-life costs and reduced complexity. One of the key principles of the Lynx concept is the integration of proven sub-systems with a high technology readiness level to reduce development time, cost and technical risk.

== Development ==
The Lynx family has been designed as a highly protected tracked armoured vehicle to fill a gap identified in the market by Rheinmetall. Lynx was designed as a private venture by Rheinmetall to provide customers with a modern fighting vehicle that will be able to counter emerging near peer threats whilst maintaining the ability to conduct asymmetric or peace-keeping operations. It was first shown publicly in June 2016, and in the lighter KF31 configuration.

On 4 June 2018 Rheinmetall issued a press release informing that the larger Lynx KF41 would debut in two different configurations at the upcoming Eurosatory defence exhibition later that month. Following the unveiling in IFV configuration on 12 June the vehicle was reconfigured as a command variant, which was unveiled on 13 June. The first configuration would be as an infantry fighting vehicle with the new Lance 2.0 turret, and then after refitting on site, configured as command variant.

As of May 2020 Rheinmetall had confirmed the company had proposed the Lynx to meet requirements in Australia, the Czech Republic, and the United States, and as of March 2022 these requirements were ongoing. The first user of the Lynx was announced as Hungary on 10 September 2020.

The Lynx Combat Support Vehicle (CSV) was unveiled on 18 October 2021. The Lynx CSV was designed to meet the Australian Army's Land 400 Phase 3 requirement for approximately 100 support vehicles capable of fulfilling the manoeuvre support, logistics, repair, and recovery roles. It was expected that the CSV variant will be marketed to other potential export customers, including Hungary and the US.

The Lynx 120 was announced by the company in February 2022. The Lynx 120 is a fire support variant of the Lynx KF41 platform. It consists of a Lynx KF41 hull mounting a large-calibre crewed turret armed with a derivative of Rheinmetall's 120 mm smoothbore gun family.

== Design ==
=== Chassis ===
The Lynx is built around a sponson-shaped hull with a long, shallow glacis and angled belly plate. The driver compartment is at the front left, the engine the front right, fighting compartment in the middle (when fitted with a turret) and there is a dismount compartment at the rear, access to which is via a ramp in the rear of the vehicle. A key feature of the Lynx design concept is the separation and modularity of the vehicle into two primary parts: the basic vehicle and specialist mission and role equipment. Lynx variants are designed around a common drive module upon which the mission kits are installed. Available kits include an IFV and APC. For the former, a turret is fitted to the roof of the hull, for the latter the turret is removed and replaced by a roof plate that includes an array of vision devices and a remote weapon station. It is understood that this transformation can be carried out near to, or in the field, within eight hours. Other variants have been developed, or will be developed. Those developed and shown include a Combat Support Vehicle and a 120 mm-armed fire support vehicle. Variants to be developed include a mortar carrier with 120 mm mortar, an ambulance, a C2/C3 vehicle, and an air defence variant.

The Lynx's overall design layout is conventional, the front right located powerpack consisting of a Liebherr six-cylinder inline diesel engine coupled to either an Allison X300 series 6F/1R or Renk HSWL 256 automatic transmission. The Liebherr diesel is of the common rail type and fitted with a two-stage turbocharger and two-stage intercooler. Power output when fitted to the Lynx varies from 755 hp (KF31) to 1,140 hp (KF41). The exhaust (right) and engine cooling (left) are routed to the rear of the vehicle to reduce its thermal and acoustic signature. Final drives are mounted in the front and the toothless idler sprockets with track tensioners are mounted at the rear. The running gear has six road wheel stations per side, which guide a lightweight steel or segmented rubber band-type track. The rubber-tyred road wheels are mounted on a suspension system comprising swing arms with conventional torsion bars and a SupaShock damper systems, this set-up is proven to be reliable and cost-efficient. The Lynx is fitted with as many mature sub-systems as possible in order to facilitate maintenance. The KF41 transmission is the same as that used in the Puma and Ajax vehicles, the Liebherr engine is widely used in the construction industry, and the driver's station is taken from the Kodiak armoured engineering vehicle. The NBC system is the same as that installed on Boxer and the tracks are identical to those used on the PzH 2000.

Mobility parameters will vary by variant and exact configuration but are stated to include a maximum road speed of 70 km/h, a gradeability of at least 60%, a sideslope traverse capability of at least 30%, the ability to climb (forwards) a 1 m vertical obstacle, the ability to cross a 2.5 m trench, and an unprepared fording depth of 1.5 m. Operational range on 900-litres of diesel fuel is 500 km.

The driver is located to the left front side of the hull and is furnished with three periscopes, one of which can be replaced with a night vision alternative. The rear crew compartment is designed as a mission neutral space with the incorporation of C-rails and a pattern of universal fixing points on the walls and floor. This provides a flexible configuration for all mission specific equipment. A large power-operated rear ramp allows for rapid ingress/egress of dismounts. For the CSV variant the most prominent design change is the removal of the turret and the alteration of the rear of the vehicle to provide a lowered loadbed for cargo to be transported on. In addition a 5 tonne capacity crane has been installed in the centre of the vehicle for cargo manipulation. The remaining internal volume below the loadbed is understood to house additional fuel tanks and storage for specialist equipment.

==== Protection ====
The protection of the Lynx is designed to be scaled according to the threat. The vehicle's ballistic steel armour is designed to protect the Lynx from anti-tank weapons, medium-caliber ammunition, artillery shrapnel and bomblets, although exact details are classified. The interior is fitted with a spall liner to protect the crew, while the vehicle also features decoupled seats in addition to mine and IED protection packages that include a double floor. The standard armour configuration is designated the Mounted Combat Operations (MCO) kit and it is intended to offer vehicle protection against similarly armed opponents. It is understood to combine an advanced passive component with active protection systems (APS), The second kit is designated the Complex Urban Environment (CUE) kit and excludes any active protection elements. Lynx is understood to be available with one further armour kit that can be used for air transportation, providing a vehicle that can deploy straight from a transport aircraft.

Additional active protection can be provided for shaped charge warhead attack using Rheinmetall's Strike Shield APS. A range of passive protection and defensive aids are also available. They include a rapid obscuration system (ROSY), laser warning system and acoustic shot locator system. These are integrated in the Lance turret when it is fitted along with automatic target recognition and automatic target tracking.

The heating, cooling and nuclear, biological and chemical filtration system is combined in an environmental control system stowed in the rear-located left sponson in front of the cooling system. Air ducts lead to the floor and to an air duct interface on the top end of the hull.

=== Armament ===
The vehicle as shown at Eurosatory 2016 was outfitted with a Lance turret mounting a stabilized, externally powered, autocannon of 30 mm or 35 mm caliber, with airburst munition support. This allows the Lynx to engage targets at ranges of up to 3,000 meters, both when static and when on the move. The vehicle's main armament has an elevation of between +45˚ and −10˚ and has a controlled rate of fire of 200 rounds per minute. Mounted coaxial to the right is the latest Rheinmetall Machine Gun (RMG) 7.62 mm, which can fire standard 7.62×51mm NATO ammunition and has a maximum rate of fire of 800 rounds a minute. The turret has manual back-up in case of power failure.

The vehicle can also mount an optional anti-tank guided missile launcher. The demonstrator vehicle at Eurosatory 2016 was outfitted with a twin-round launcher for the Spike-LR anti-tank guided missile.

The IFV variant of the KF41 variant shown at Eurosatory 2018 was fitted with the updated Lance 2.0 turret, this having flexible mission pods fitted on the left and right sides so that a variety of subsystems can be installed to provide the turret with specialist capabilities.

The Lynx 120 fire support variant is armed with a derivative of Rheinmetall's 120 mm smoothbore gun family that is capable of firing the DM11 programmable HE round. A light machine gun is mounted co-axially with the main armament, and a RWS armed with a 12.7 mm heavy machine gun is installed on the rear of the turret roof behind the commander's panoramic sight. A row of eight Wegmann 76 mm smoke dischargers is also installed on either side of the turret behind the two hatches.

== Variants ==
=== Chassis ===
The Lynx family of tracked armoured vehicles is based around two primary models, the KF31 and a slightly larger but considerably heavier KF41. Both models can be configured for a variety of roles that include command and control, armoured reconnaissance, surveillance, repair, recovery or ambulance operations in addition to infantry fighting vehicle configuration.

==== Specifications ====
Parameters	KF31	KF41
	Dimensions	
Height (hull)	3.30 m (10.8 ft)	
Width (hull)	3.60 m (11.8 ft)	
Width (with add-on armour)	–	3.78 m (12.4 ft)
Length (hull)	7.20 m (23.6 ft)	7.845 m (25.74 ft)
	Mass	
Mass (base variant)	–	34.0 t (75,000 lb)
Payload (mission module / load / add-on armour)	–	≤ 16.0 t (35,300 lb)
GVM (limit capacity)	≥ 42.0 t (92,600 lb)	≥ 50.0 t (110,200 lb)
	Performances	
Max. speed (on road)	≥ 65 km/h (40 mph)	
Range (on road)	500 km (310 mi)	
Fuel	–	> 700 L (180 US gal) in the sponsons + additional reserve in engine bay
Vertical step (climbing capability)	–	1.00 m (3.28 ft)
Trench crossing	–	2.50 m (8.2 ft)
Ground clearance	0.45 to 0.50 m (1.5 to 1.6 ft)	
Wading depth	1.50 m (4.9 ft)	
Gradient	60% (31.0°)	
Side slope	30% (16.7°)	
	Powertrain and drive train	
Engine	–	Liebherr D976; Inline 6, diesel engine, 18 litres
Engine power	750 hp (560 kW)	1,140 hp (850 kW) (alternative variant of the D976, 1,072 hp (799 kW))
Engine torque	–	4,300 N⋅m (3,200 lb⋅ft)
Power-to-weight ratio at GVM	17.9 PS/t (13.2 kW/t)	23 hp/t (17 kW/t) (alternative variant of the D976, 21.44 hp (15.99 kW))
Transmissions	Renk HSWL 256, automatic (6F / 6R) / Allison X300	Renk HSWL 256, automatic (6F / 6R) / Allison X300
Hybrid-electric drive transmissions alternatives	–	Renk HSWL 295 EVO, automatic (5F / 5R) / Allison eGen Force electric-hybrid (8F / 3R) (for the Lynx XM30)
Suspension	Conventional suspension from (swing arms, torsion bars, hydraulic shock absorbers)	Supashock conventional suspension (torsion bar, swing arms and hydraulic dampening system) / Hydropneumatic "In Arm" Horstmann (Lynx XM30)
Tracks	Segmented rubber tracks	Cook Defence Systems TR40 / U.S. Loc Performance Products / Soucy CRT (composite rubber tracks) (Lynx XM30)
Running gear	Six dual rubber tyred road wheel (on each side)	
	Architecture	
Digital architecture	–	NATO Generic Vehicle Architecture (NGVA) / Electronic systems also used on the GTK Boxer
Driver compartment	–	Taken from the AEV 3 Kodiak
Crew / passengers (APC / IFV variant)	3 (commander, driver, gunner) / 6 infantry	3 (commander, driver, gunner) / 8 infantry
	Protection	
Armour configurations	Modular armour with 3 main configurations: MCO-Kit (mounted combat operations): highest level of protection (with APS) / CUE-Kit (complex urban environment): for peacekeeping missions (without APS) / AT-kit (air-transportable):	
Ballistic armour	Steel armour with various appliques	
Base ballistic protection	–	Level 6 (NATO AEP-55 STANAG 4569 - kinetic energy), and Level 6 (NATO AEP-55 STANAG 4569 - artillery)
Base mine / IED protection	–	Level 4a/4b (NATO AEP-55 STANAG 4569)
APS (hard kill) options	–	Rheinmetall StrikeShield (AMAP-ADS)
Smoke	–	ROSY combined with KNDS Deutschland 76mm / Lacroix Galix 80mm (Italian Lynx)
Sensors	Electronic laser warning receiver triggering multispectral smoke / Acoustic shot detection systems alert and assisting the gunner to acquire the target	
Camouflage options	Rheinmetall SolarΣshield (fabric reducing the IR and UV signature) / Saab Barracuda (fabric reducing the IR / UV / radar signatures) /	
NBC protecion	Protective ventilation system (with Beth El protective filters)	

=== Variants and mission modules ===
==== Prototypes ====
- Lynx 120 Fire Support with the Leonardo HITFACT Mk II turret

==== Other variants ====
Variants shown as of March 2022 include the Lynx 120 that was first shown in February 2022, the Lynx Combat Support Vehicle that was first shown in October 2021, and the APC/command configuration which was shown as an overnight conversion from a KF41 at Eurosatory 2018. Variants that have been announced as to be developed (for Hungary) are a mortar carrier with 120 mm mortar, an ambulance, a C2/C3 vehicle, and an air defence variant with cannon. Other variants will require development if contracts are awarded and these will include logistics and ammunition transporters.

== Operators ==
Lynx operators: Current Future

=== Current operators ===
Hungary (218)
Hungary ordered 218 vehicles. On 17 August 2020, the government of Hungary and Rheinmetall Group signed a contract to start manufacturing the Lynx infantry fighting vehicle family for the Hungarian Ground Forces in Hungary. Few other details emerged at the time about the deal, which is part of Hungary's Zrinyi 2026 rearmament programme launched in 2017. On 10 September 2020 Rheinmetall and the Government of Hungary held a joint press conference in Budapest and among the details of the new joint manufacturing project they announced that a new factory, along with an almost three square kilometer-sized full-service vehicle test track called ZALA Zone, would be built near Zalaegerszeg, Hungary.
Rheinmetall's press release of 10 September 2020 confirmed that the Hungarian Ministry of Defence had awarded Rheinmetall an order to supply tracked armoured vehicles and related products and services with a total value of more than €2 billion. The contract covers 218 Lynx infantry fighting vehicles fitted with Rheinmetall's manned 30mm Lance turret. The larger/heavier Lynx KF41 has been selected by Hungary. The award also includes nine Leopard 2 based Buffalo armoured recovery vehicles, plus additional products and services that include simulators, training and instruction, plus an initial supply of spare parts as well as maintenance support. During a first phase of production, Hungary is to receive 46 Lynx plus the nine Buffalo ARVs, with delivery to be complete by the start of 2023. These vehicles will be built in Germany, but for the second production phase an additional 172 Lynx will be built in Hungary. To this end, it was confirmed the Hungarian government and Rheinmetall had agreed in August 2020 to establish a joint venture responsible for creating a Lynx production facility in Hungary, to be financed by a local company.: A government document published in June 2021 talks about 256 Lynx IFVs being ordered. It also mentions the development and production of an air-defence variant using the Lynx chassis.:
The factory building near Zalaegerszeg is ready, the tooling is under installation, the production starts late 2022, early 2023 with a planned production rate of 50 Lynx vehicles / year. Rheinmetall are reportedly going to develop and deliver the following versions for the Hungarian Army:
- Infantry fighting vehicles (IFV)
- Reconnaissance
- Joint fire observer
- Mortar Carrier with 120mm mortar
- Ambulance
- C2/C3 vehicle
- Driver training vehicles
- Air Defence variant with autocannon and missiles especially designed to counter drones. The contract was signed on 15th of December (2023) to develop and deliver a testable prototype with SkyRanger 30 for the Hungarian Armed Forces. The first serial production Lynx IFV was officially handed over to the Hungarian Army on the 15th of October, 2022.
The production of the first Hungarian-made Lynx IFV has started in Rheinmetall's newly built Zalaegerszeg plant on 12th of January, 2023.
Ukraine
In 2023, Rheinmetall announced Ukraine expressed Interest in the Lynx and the KF51. On December 1st, Reuters reported that Rheinmetall was aiming to begin production of the vehicle in Ukraine by late 2024 in partnership with the Ukrainian government. This initiative was confirmed during the Ukraine Recovery Conference in Berlin on June 11–12, 2024.
In July 2024, it was announced that Ukraine would soon receive its first KF41 Lynx.
In October 2024, it was announced that the production of the first KF41 Lynx was started in Ukraine.
In January 2025, it was announced that the first KF41 Lynx infantry fighting vehicle was delivered to Ukraine in late 2024 for field testing.

=== Future operators ===
Italy (69)
In July 2024 Leonardo and Rheinmetall have signed a Memorandum of Understanding to establish a new 50:50 joint venture aimed at developing a European industrial and technological approach in the field of land defence systems. The objective of the agreement is the industrial development and subsequent commercialisation of the new Main Battle Tank (MBT) and the new Lynx Platform for the Armoured Infantry Combat System (AICS), within the Italian Army's ground systems programs.
In February 2025, the Italian Army announced that it initiated the test and evaluation phase of the KF-41. The first five Lynxs will be delivered in 2025 in the Hungarian configuration but with manuals and operating systems translated to Italian and will later be refitted with HITFIST 30. The following 16 Lynxs will be configured with a HITFIST 30 already installed and delivered in 2026.
Firm orders:
- 21 Lynx ordered on 5 November 2025:
  - 5 IFV with a Lance turret
  - 16 IFV with a Leonardo Hitfist 30mm turret
- 48 Lynx ordered in October 2026.
Romania (298)
In 2023, Rheinmetall submitted the Lynx KF41 for the Tracked Infantry Fighting Vehicle - MLI programme. The Lynx competed with the ASCOD 2 proposed by General Dynamics and the AS21 Redback proposed by Hanwha. This programme was planned in two phases: a first involving the purchase of 246 IFV, including training simulators, and a second which envisioned the procurement of 52 more IFV after 2031 for a total of 298.
After acquiring the majority stake of the Automecanica Mediaș truck build-on and trailer manufacturer in February 2024, Rheinmetall announced the intention of producing the Lynx armoured fighting vehicles as well as the HX trucks in Romania.
In November 2025, it was announced that Romania would acquire 298 Lynx from Rheinmetall with partial local production occurring. The contract for 298 Lynx vehicles and derivatives funded through the SAFE programme was signed the 29 May 2026, worth €3.337 billion (without VAT). The production will be carried out locally by Rheinmetall Automecanica. The following configurations will be included:
- IFV, equipped with the Lance 2.0 turret and the MK30-2/ABM 30 mm autocannon;
- Mortar carrier, equipped with Patria NEMO 120 mm mortars;
- Command post;
- MEDEVAC;
- 24 anti-aircraft vehicles, equipped with Skyranger 35 systems.

=== Potential orders ===
Brazil (143)
As of November 2025, a demand of up to 143 vehicles are considered as possible to be sold.

Greece (205)

Rheinmetall has offered to set up a production line in Greece for Lynx KF41 armoured fighting vehicles if the Hellenic Army selects it as its replacement infantry fighting vehicle for the now aging M113s and BMP-1s. The offer also includes a production line for upgrading the existing Leopard 2A4 of the Hellenic Army to the 2A7+ standard. The Greek government approved the acquisition of 205 KF41 Lynx IFVs and the upgrading of 123 Leopard 2A4 to the Leopard 2A7 configuration on 10 February 2023.
As of November 2025, a demand of up to 205 vehicles are considered as possible to be sold.
Indonesia (143)
As of November 2025, a demand of up to 143 vehicles are considered as possible to be sold.
Italy (1,029)
As of November 2025, a demand of up to 1,050 vehicles are considered as possible to be sold, which would be 1,029 additional vehicles.

Ukraine (300)

As of November 2025, a demand of up to 300 vehicles are considered as possible to be sold.
United States (3,800)
The U.S. Army launched several programmes to replace the M2 and M3 Bradley, and two tentatives to replace them were cancelled:
- Ground Combat Vehicle programme launched in 2009, cancelled in 2014.
- Next Generation Combat Vehicle programme launched in June 2018, and the part relating to the future IFV was known as the Optionally Manned Fighting Vehicle (OMFV) in October 2018. In March 2019, the Army issued a request for proposals. In January 2023, BAE Systems decided not to compete. GDLS offered the Griffin III, and Rheinmetall in collaboration with Raytheon offered the KF41 Lynx. Prototypes were supposed to be provided to the Army, but Rheinmetall couldn't supply its Lynx in time, and the Griffin III was overweight, therefore the competition was cancelled. In July 2021, the programme was rebooted, and it is still known as the OMFV. In a first phase, five companies were pre-selected to participate to the concept design phase:
- American Rheinmetall with the KF41
- BAE Systems, with a new chassis with hybrid propulsion and the Elbit UT50 unmanned turret
- GDLS with the Griffin III chassis based on the ASCOD 2
- Oshkosh Defense partnered with Hanwha, Rafael ADS, QinetiQ Inc. and Plasan. and offered the K21 equipped with a SAMSON turret.
- Point Blank Enterprises with a new chassis design.
In June 2023, the offers of Rheinmetall and GDLS were selected to compete in the next phase. A budget of US$1.6 billion was provided to develop further each offer.
In August 2023, American Rheinmetall signed a contract for the Phase 3 and 4 of the programme renamed as XM30 Mechanized Infantry Combat Vehicle (MICV) for a value exceeding US$700 million. Rheinmetall is teaming with Textron Systems, Raytheon Technologies, L3 Harris Technologies, Allison Transmission and Anduril Industries. Twelve prototypes, as well as several ballistic hulls and turrets, armour coupons, ballistic kits, and data will have to be produced by both competitors.
The main characteristics required for the future IFV include:
- 2 crews and 6 dismount soldiers
- Turret:
  - 50 mm XM913 chain gun
  - Anti-tank guided missiles (successor of the BGM-71 TOW)
  - Machine guns
  - Active protection system against missiles and UAVs
- Modular design and open architecture, with cyber security capabilities
- Ability to transport 2 IFV in a C-17
By the end of 2027, the US Army will have selected a winner, and will initiate the Phase 5 of the programme with the Low-Rate Initial Production until 2029, and plans for a Full-Rate Production by 2030. It should enter service with the first units in 2029. The total production is estimated at 3,800 units for a cost of US$45 billion.

=== Unsuccessful bids ===
Australia
Rheinmetall submitted the Lynx KF41 for the Australian Defence Force's Land 400 Phase 3 program (also known as the Mounted Close Combat Capability), the Request for Tender (RFT) for which was released on 24 August 2018. Land 400 Phase 3 will replace the Australian Army's M113AS4 armoured personnel carriers (APCs) with up to 450 infantry fighting vehicles (IFVs) and 17 manoeuvre support vehicles. In mid-September 2019, Rheinmetall's Lynx KF41 and Hanwha's AS21 Redback were shortlisted. Down-selection of a preferred tenderer that will be presented to the government for consideration is expected during 2022 and following that an initial operating capability of the selected platform is expected to be reached in 2024–2025, while final operating capability is expected by 2030–2031. Rheinmetall has also responded to a request for information on the procurement of another 117 vehicles under the Land 400 programme, these configured as logistics, mortar carries with direct fire capabilities, mortar ammo providers, and protected amphibious platforms. It was reported in April 2023 that only 129 vehicles, enough for one mechanized battalion, would be ordered out of the original 450.
In July 2023 the Australian Defence Force selected the AS21 Redback instead of the Lynx KF41.
Czech Republic
Rheinmetall offered the Lynx KF41 as part of the Czech Land Force's program to replace their aging BVP-2 vehicles. The Czech procurement negotiations, while a separate project, will be coordinated with those of Slovakia. In July 2022, the Czech Republic announced it was acquiring the CV90 Mk IV, which was also selected by Slovakia a month earlier.
Poland
The Polish Army is looking for a heavy infantry fighting vehicle. The KF41 is compete against AS21 Redback, General Dynamics Ajax, BAE Systems AMPV, and the Otokar Tulpar. Ultimately, the vehicle was not selected for procurement; instead, the decision was made to implement the domestic CBWP Ratel project.
Slovakia
The Lynx KF41 was tendered in response to the Slovak Armed Forces’ re-equipment programme. In June 2022, Slovakia announced it would acquire the BAE Systems CV9035 Mk IV.

== Gallery ==
Lynx family variants

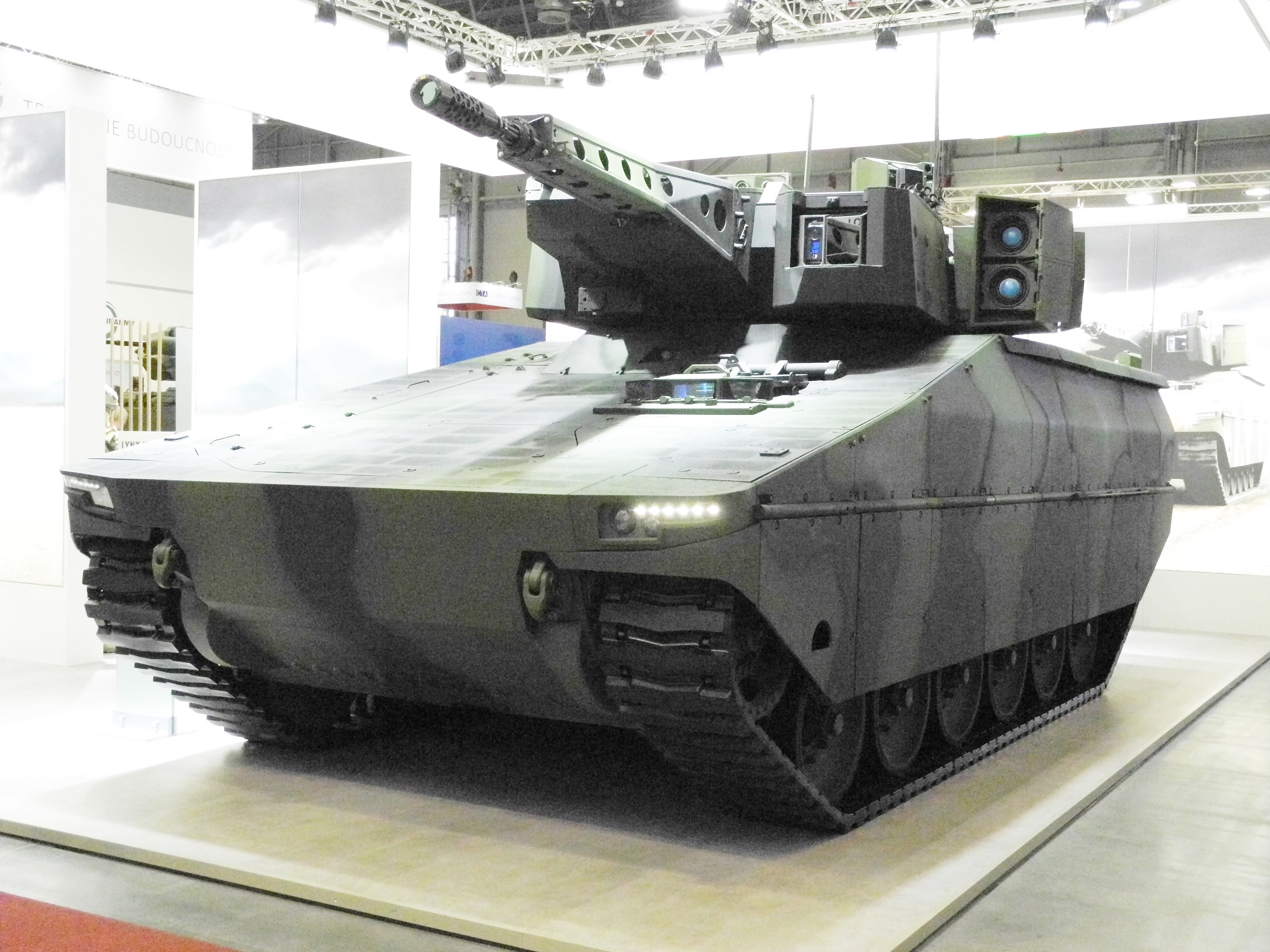
Lynx KF31 prototype with Lance turret presented at IDET 2017

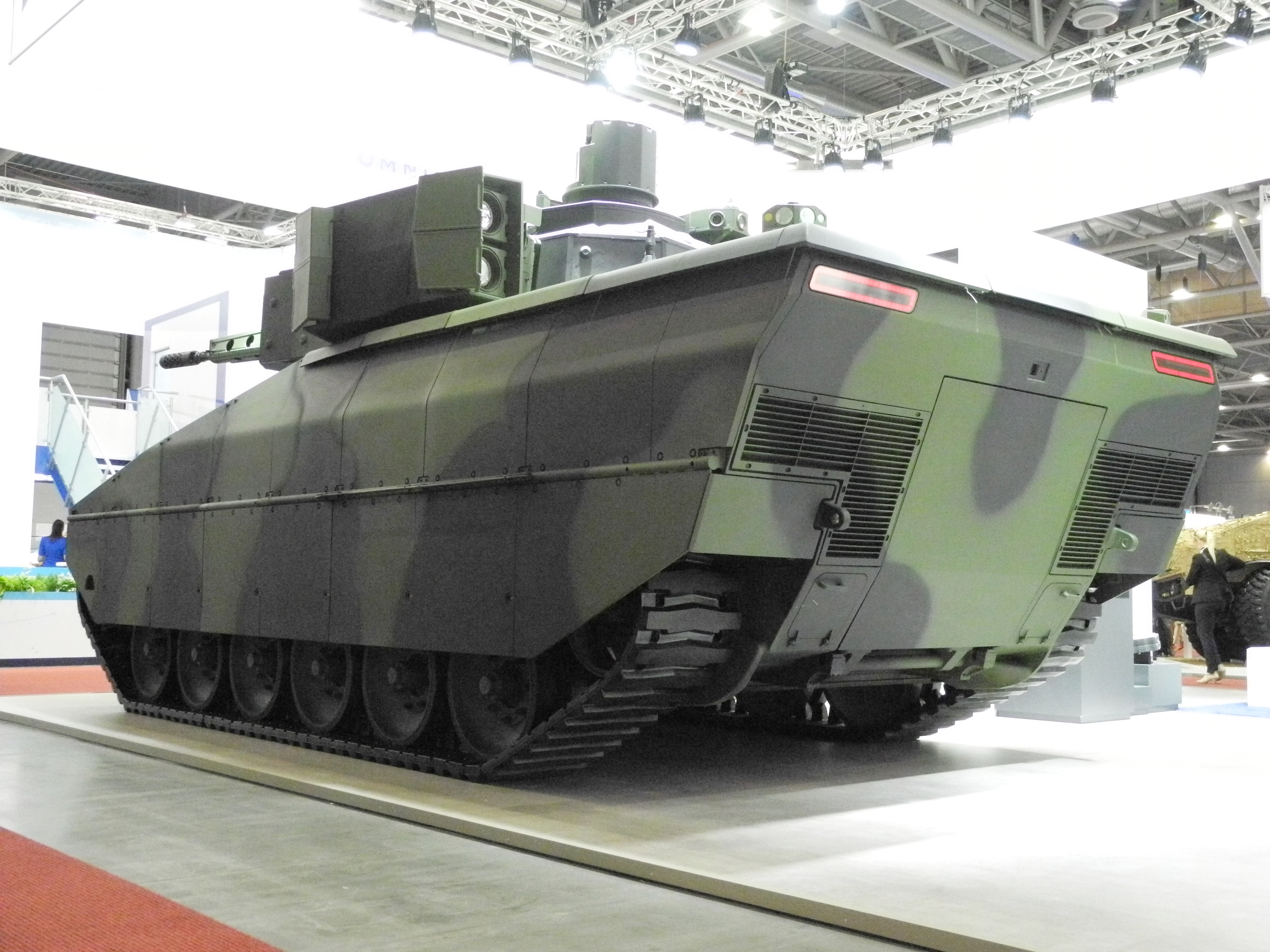
Lynx KF31 with Lance turret prototype presented at IDET 2017

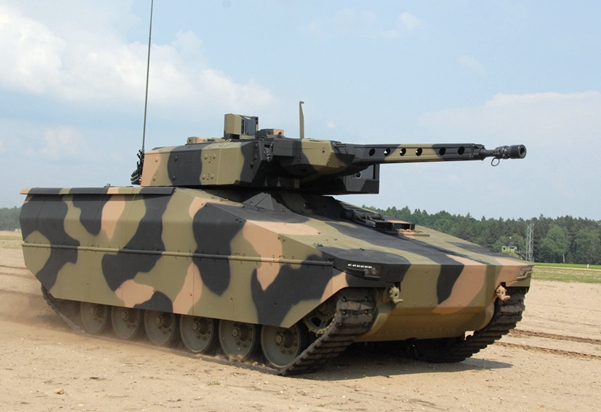
Evaluation of the Lynx KF31 in Australia

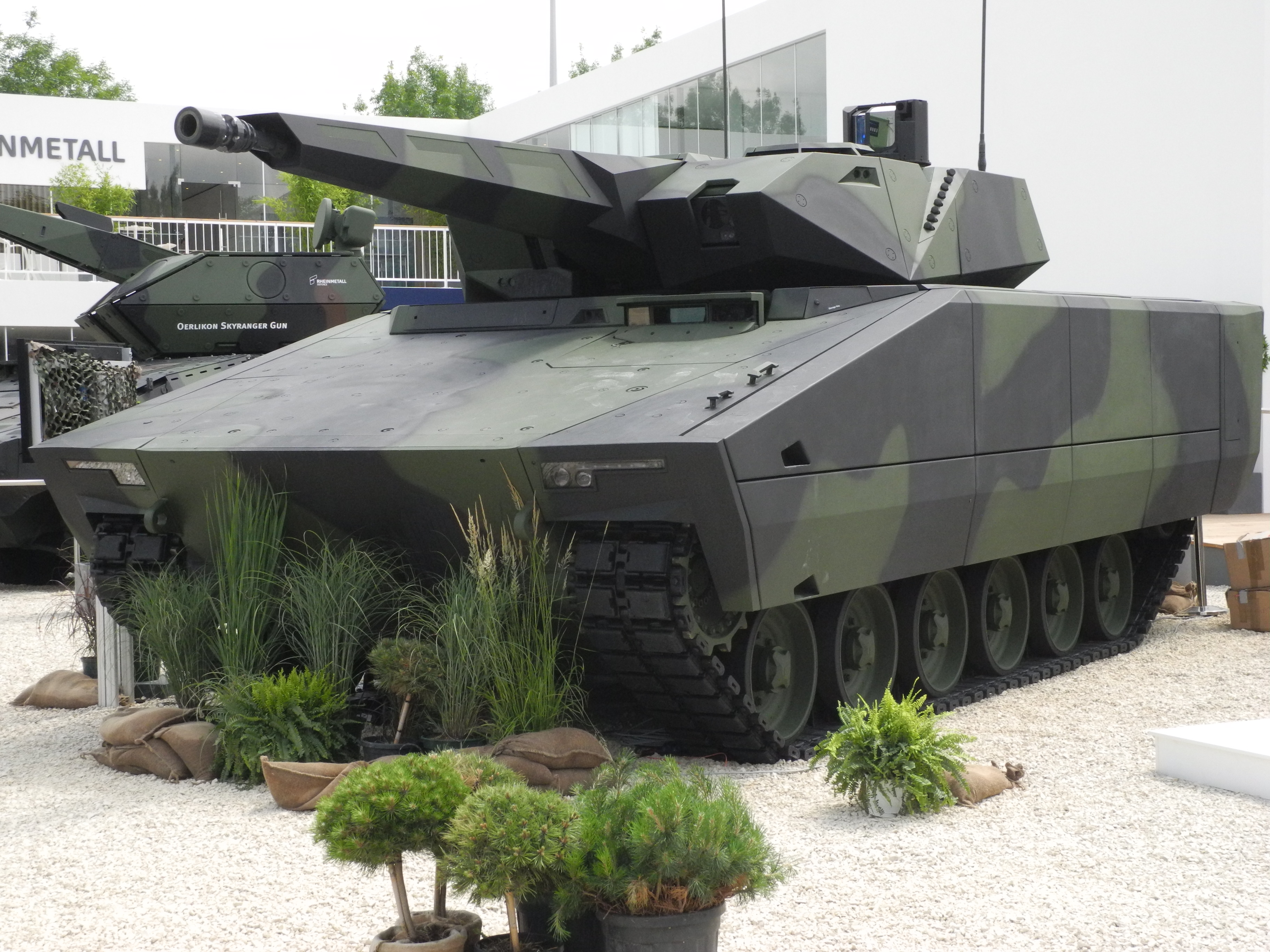
Lynx KF41 prototype with Lance 2.0 turret unveiled at Eurosatory 2018

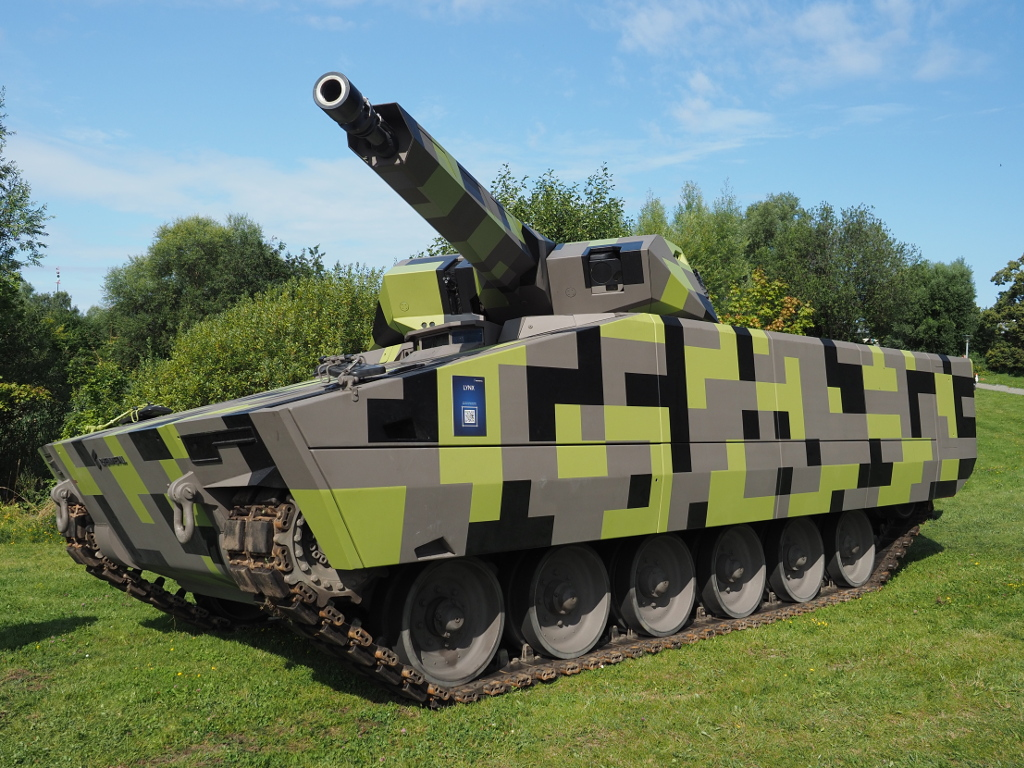
Lynx KF41 prototype.

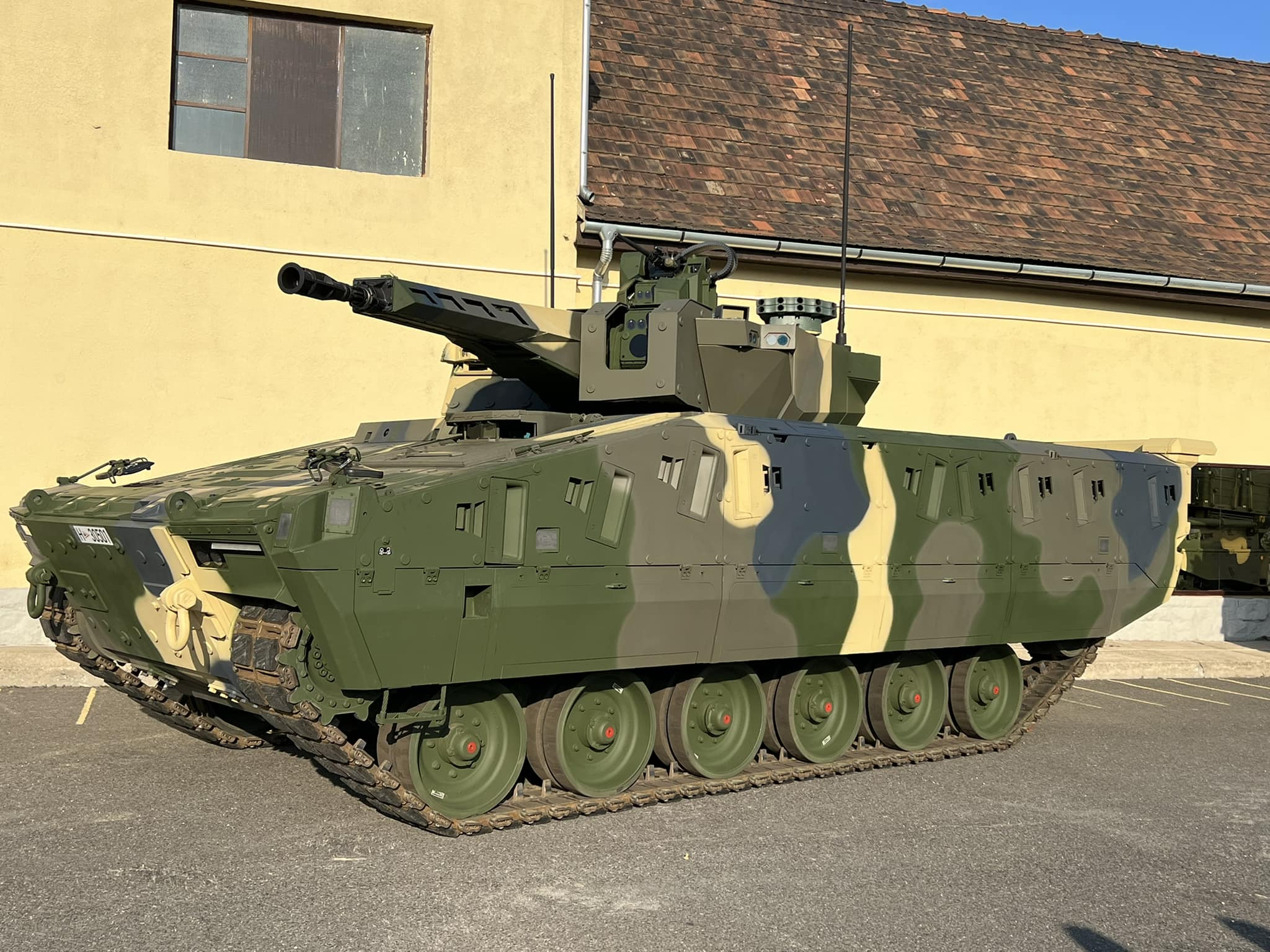
First serial-production Lynx KF41 (Hungarian Army colours)

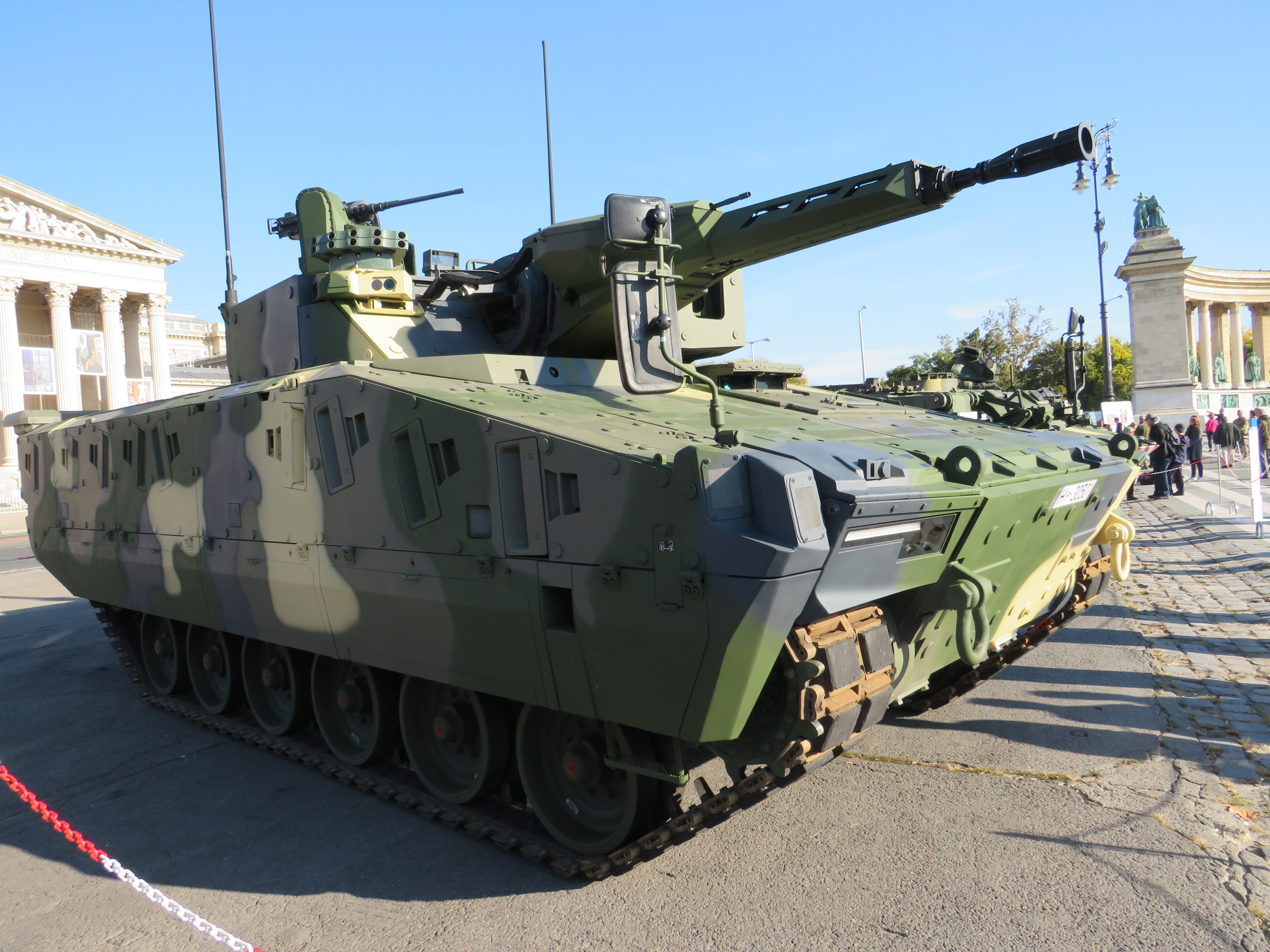
First serial-production Lynx KF41 (Hungarian Army colours)

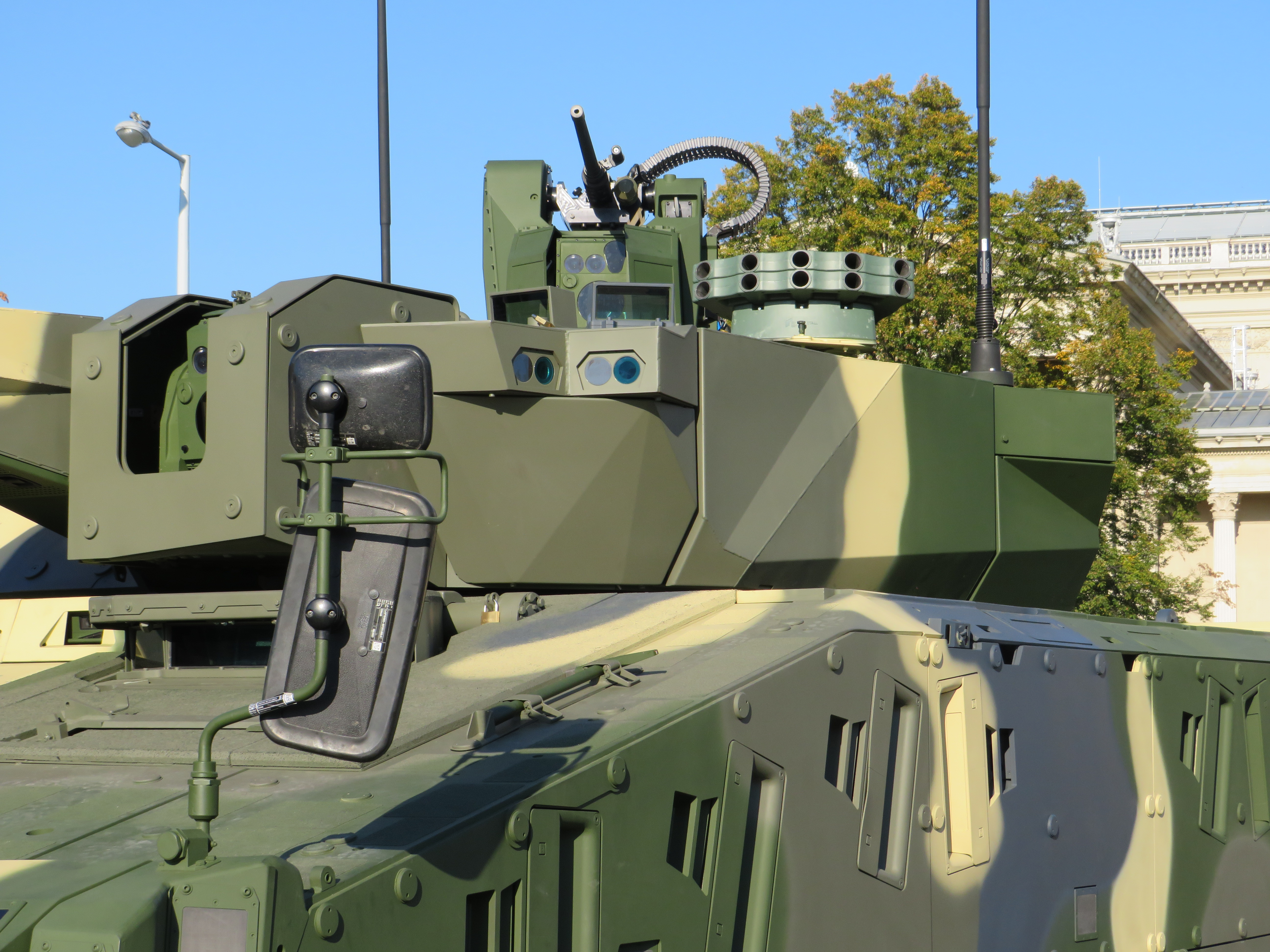
First serial-production Lynx KF41 (Hungarian Army colours)

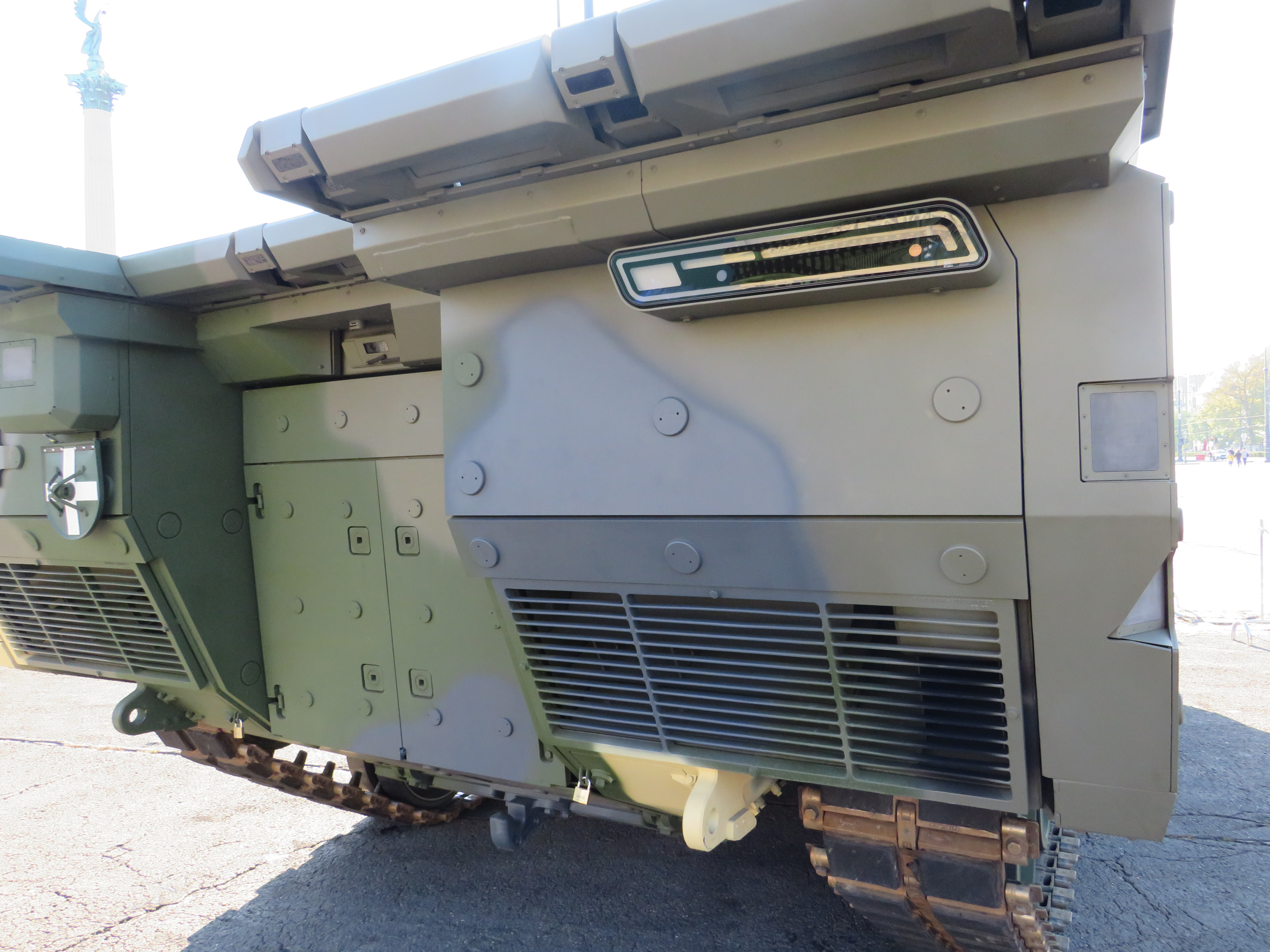
First serial-production Lynx KF41 (Hungarian Army colours)

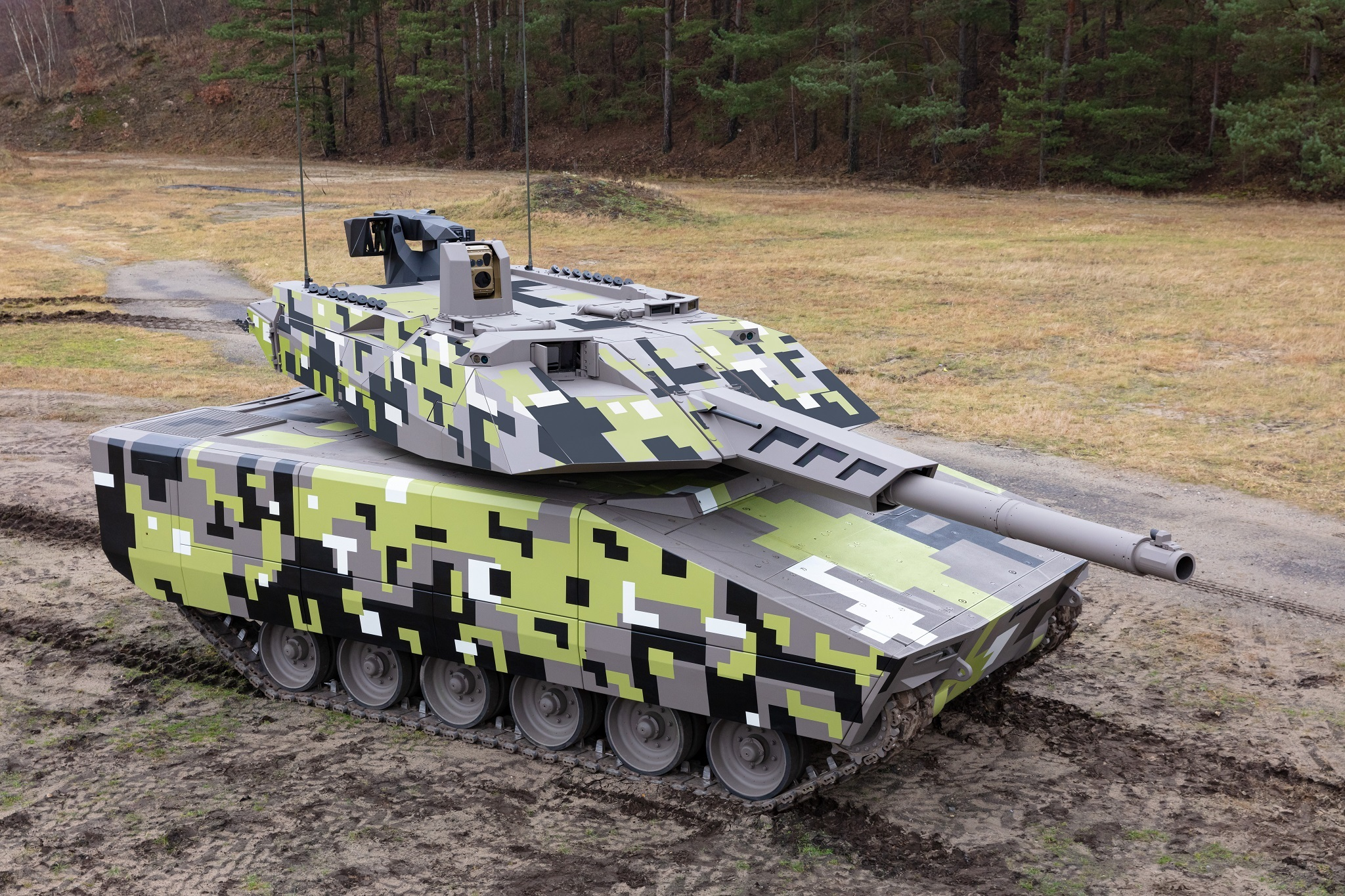
Lynx KF41 120 FSV (fire support vehicle) demonstrator

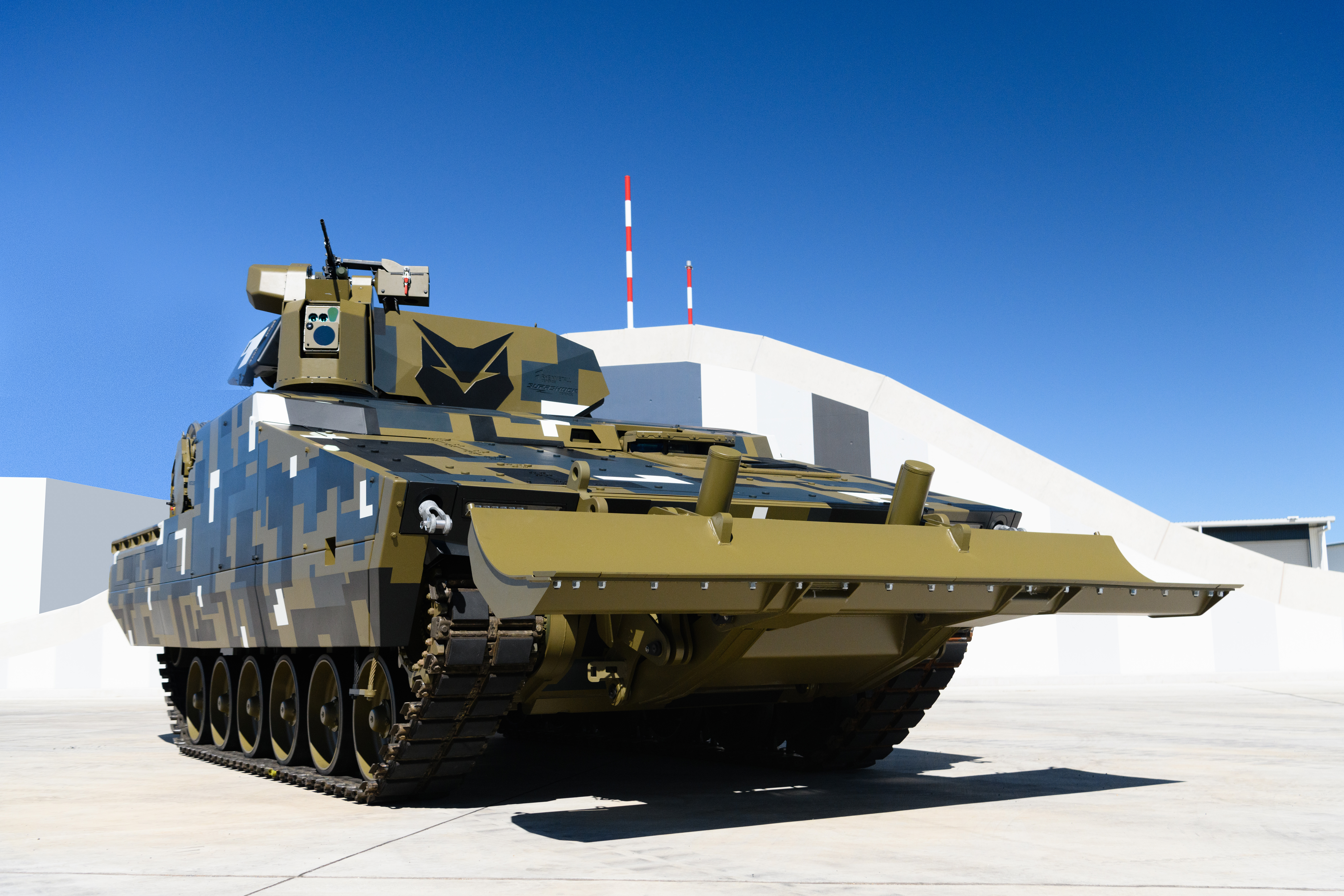
Lynx CSV (combat support vehicle) designed for the Australian Army

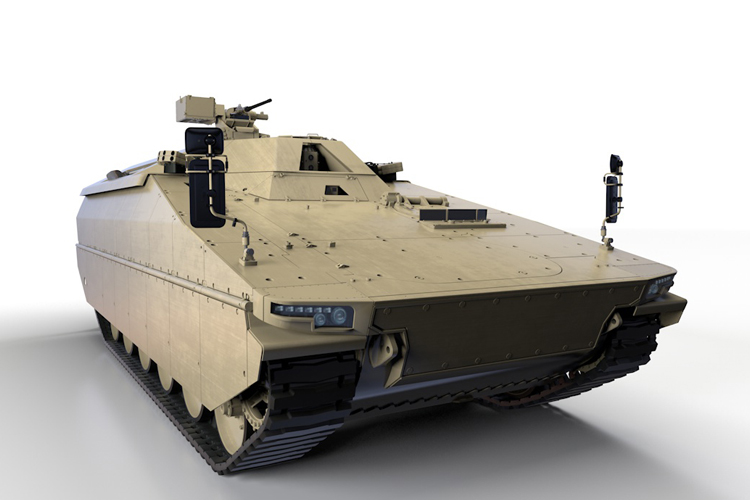
Lynx KF31 APC (armoured personnel carrier) rendering

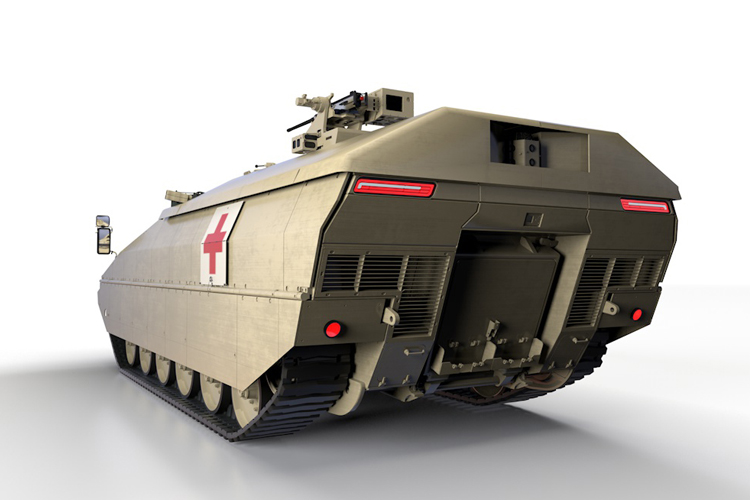
Lynx KF31 ambulance rendering

== See also ==
- List of tracked infantry fighting vehicles
- ASCOD (Spain, Austria)
  - Ulan (Austria)
  - VCI/C Pizarro (Spain)
- ASCOD 2 (Spain)
  - GD Ajax (United Kingdom)
  - GD Griffin (United States)
  - GDELS Hunter (Spain)
  - M10 Booker (United States)
  - Sabrah light tank (Spain, Czech Republic)
  - Vehículo de Apoyo de Cadenas (Spain)
- Borsuk (Poland)
- Combat Vehicle 90 (Sweden)
- Hunter (Singapore)
- K21 (South Korea)
  - AS21 Redback (South Korea, Australia)
  - K21 NIFV (South Korea)
- Kurganets-25 (Russia)
- SPz Puma (Germany)
- Vikram VT21 (India)
