= Inga Beale =

British insurance executive (b. 1963)

Dame Inga Kristine Beale DBE
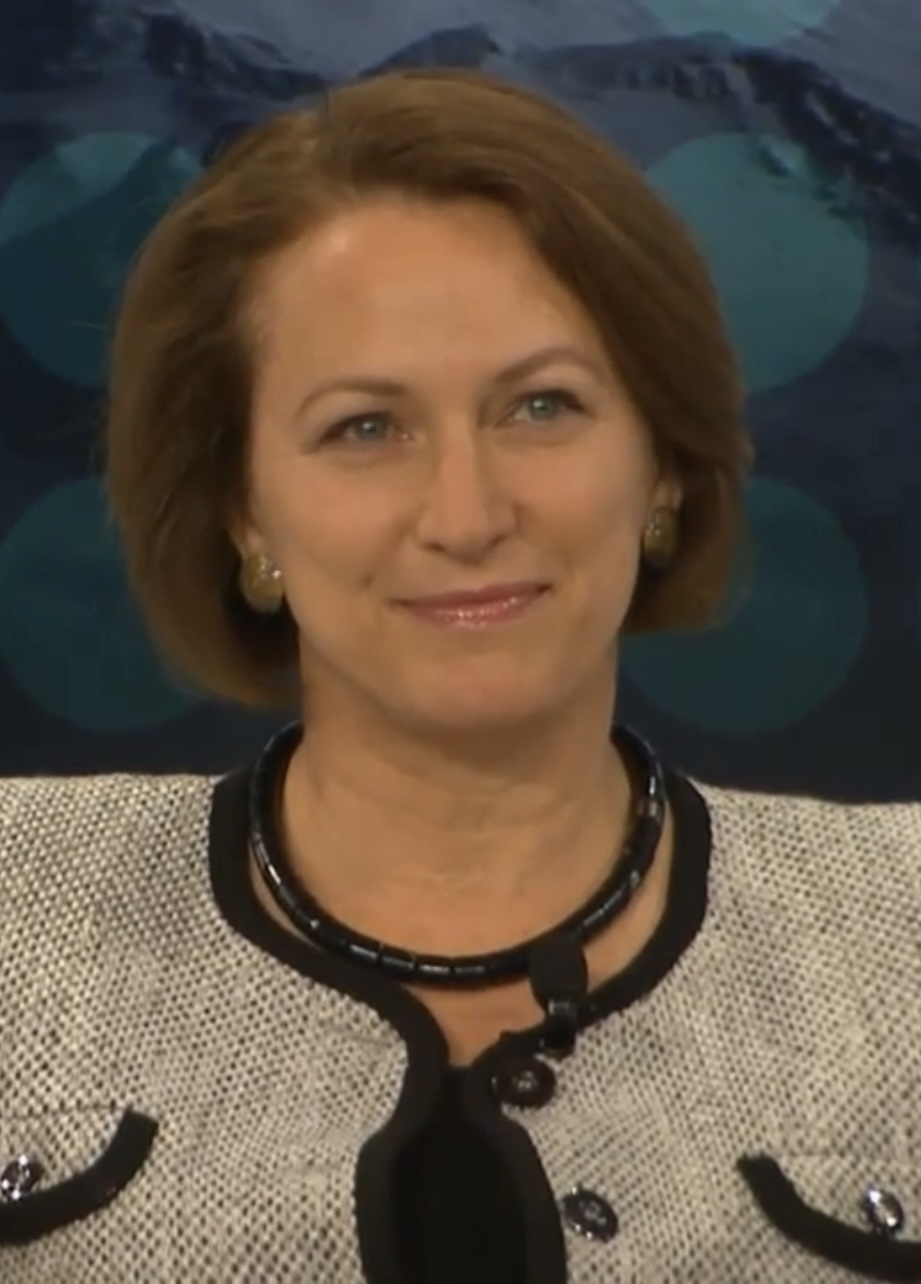
- Beale in 2015
- Born: May 15, 1963 (age 63); Newbury, Berkshire, UK
- Education: Newbury College (England), Economics and Accounting
- Occupation: Business executive
- Employer: Lloyd's of London
- Known for: Former CEO of Lloyd's of London
- Spouse: Philippe Pfeiffer (m. 2013)

Dame Inga Kristine Beale, DBE (born 15 May 1963) is a British businesswoman and the former CEO of Lloyd's of London from 2013 to 2018. She is a trustee of the International Panel on the Information Environment and has been the president of The British-Swiss Chamber of Commerce since February 2022.

== Early life and education ==
Beale is the second child of an English father and a Norwegian mother.

She studied economics and accounting at Newbury College, Berkshire.

== Career ==
Beale started her career in 1982, at Prudential Assurance Company in London. She trained as an underwriter, specialising in international treaty reinsurance. The industry was composed predominantly of men at the time; she once took issue with posters in the office depicting half-naked women, only to have her colleagues plaster them across her computer and chair.

She took a year off in 1989, cycling in Australia and backpacking in Asia. She left Prudential in 1992, to work as an underwriter in General Electric's insurance division. She joined GE's management in Kansas in 2001. She continued with GE Insurance Solutions until 2006, taking leadership roles in Paris and Munich. Beale then headed Swiss reinsurer Converium. In 2008, she joined Zurich Insurance Group as a member of their Group Management Board. The following year, she was named the group's Global Chief Underwriting Officer. From 2012–13, she was the Group CEO at the privately held Lloyd's insurer Canopius.

Beale was announced as the new CEO of Lloyd's of London in December 2013, replacing Richard Ward. She was Lloyd's first female CEO in the insurance market's 328-year history.

In June 2018, it was announced that she would be stepping down as CEO of Lloyd's after leading the global insurance and reinsurance market for five years.

Beale, who is bisexual, has been instrumental in the launch of Pride@Lloyds, an internal LGBT employee resource group, and has supported the LGBT Insurance Network.

She helped start the international Insurance Supper Club for leading female executives. In 2015, Beale became the first woman, and the first openly bisexual person, to be named number one in the OUTstanding & FT Leading LGBT executive power list.

Beale is the Chair of the HIV Commission established by UK AIDS charities the Terrence Higgins Trust and National AIDS Trust. The year-long Commission was scheduled to publish its recommendations in spring 2021. The UK Government committed to end HIV transmission in the country by 2030 and were to develop its action plan once it received the HIV Commission’s report.

Beale was appointed Dame Commander of the Order of the British Empire (DBE) in the 2017 New Year Honours for services to the economy.

In February 2022, she was appointed president of The British-Swiss Chamber of Commerce.

In December 2024, she joined the Board of the International Panel on the Information Environment.

== Political views ==
Beale was an active advocate for the need for a settled business operating environment within the UK. At the World Economic Forum in 2018, Beale expressed concerns over the impact on business of remaining Brexit uncertainties as Brexit negotiations entered a second phase to focus on a trade deal once the UK left the European Union.

== Personal life ==
Beale played competitive rugby for London's Wasps into her thirties, nearly making it to the international level. In 2013, she married Philippe Pfeiffer, a Swiss jewellery designer, and the couple live in Spitalfields, London.
