= William Cook Group =

British steel company

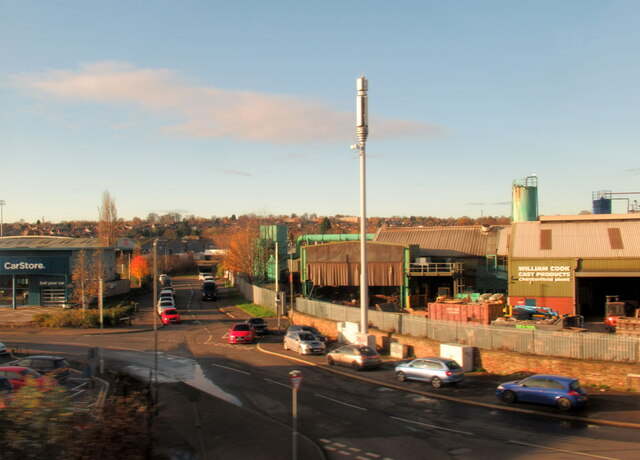
Company buildings, Sheffield

The William Cook Group is a British steel company headquartered in Sheffield, South Yorkshire, England. It is the UK's largest manufacturer of steel castings.

== History ==
William Cook was founded in 1840 in Glasgow, by the present chairman's great-great-grandfather, William Cook. After surviving a bank failure in the latter half of the 19th century, a small factory was founded in Sheffield in 1883, making crucible steel castings for collieries. The company remained in family ownership until 1956, when the company was floated on the London Stock Exchange. The company continued to grow, building and developing a new works in Sheffield, which is today one of the group's four main plants.

The present Chairman, Sir Andrew Cook, took control of the company in 1981. In 2004, the company was brought back to 100% family ownership after a hostile takeover bid from Triplex-Lloyd plc.

== Company structure ==
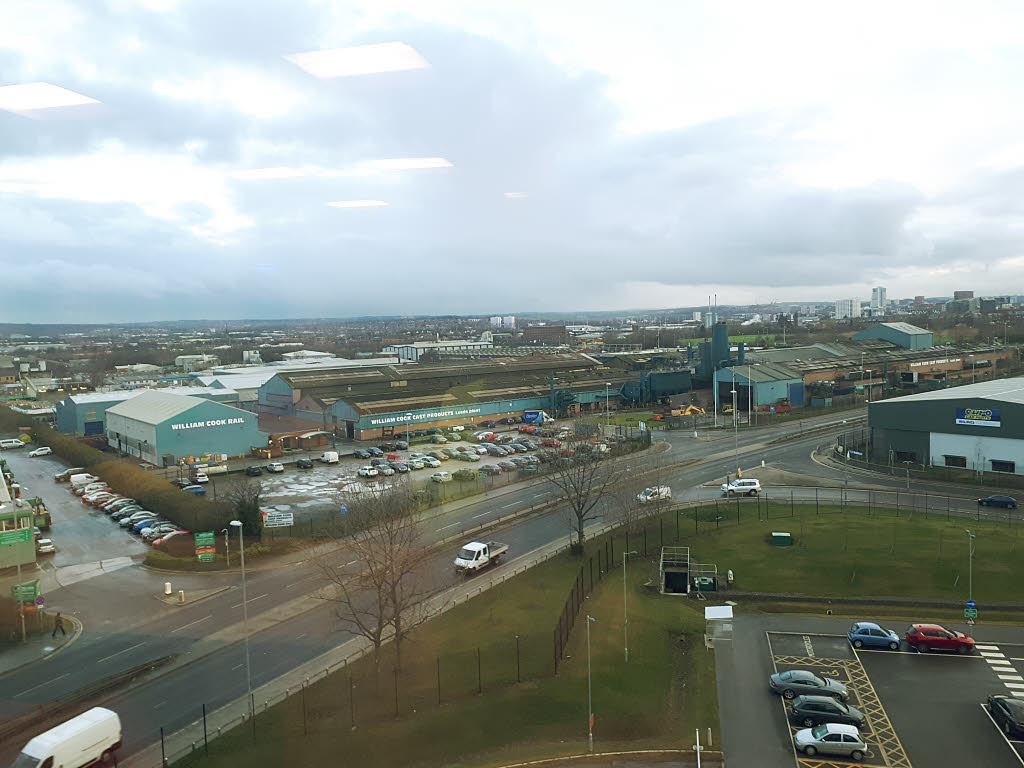
William Cook factory, Leeds

The William Cook group consists of three arms - Cook Defence Systems, William Cook Rail and William Cook Cast Products. William Cook Cast Products specialises in high-specification castings in specialist alloys for energy, infrastructure and specialist engineering. Cook Defence Systems makes track systems and armoured steel castings for fighting vehicles. William Cook Rail makes cast steel components and complete coupler assemblies for trains. The company has three main plants - one in Sheffield, one in Leeds, and one in Stanhope. The company is a member of the Cast Metals Federation, and the University of Sheffield Advanced Manufacturing Research Centre (AMRC).

== Significant activity ==
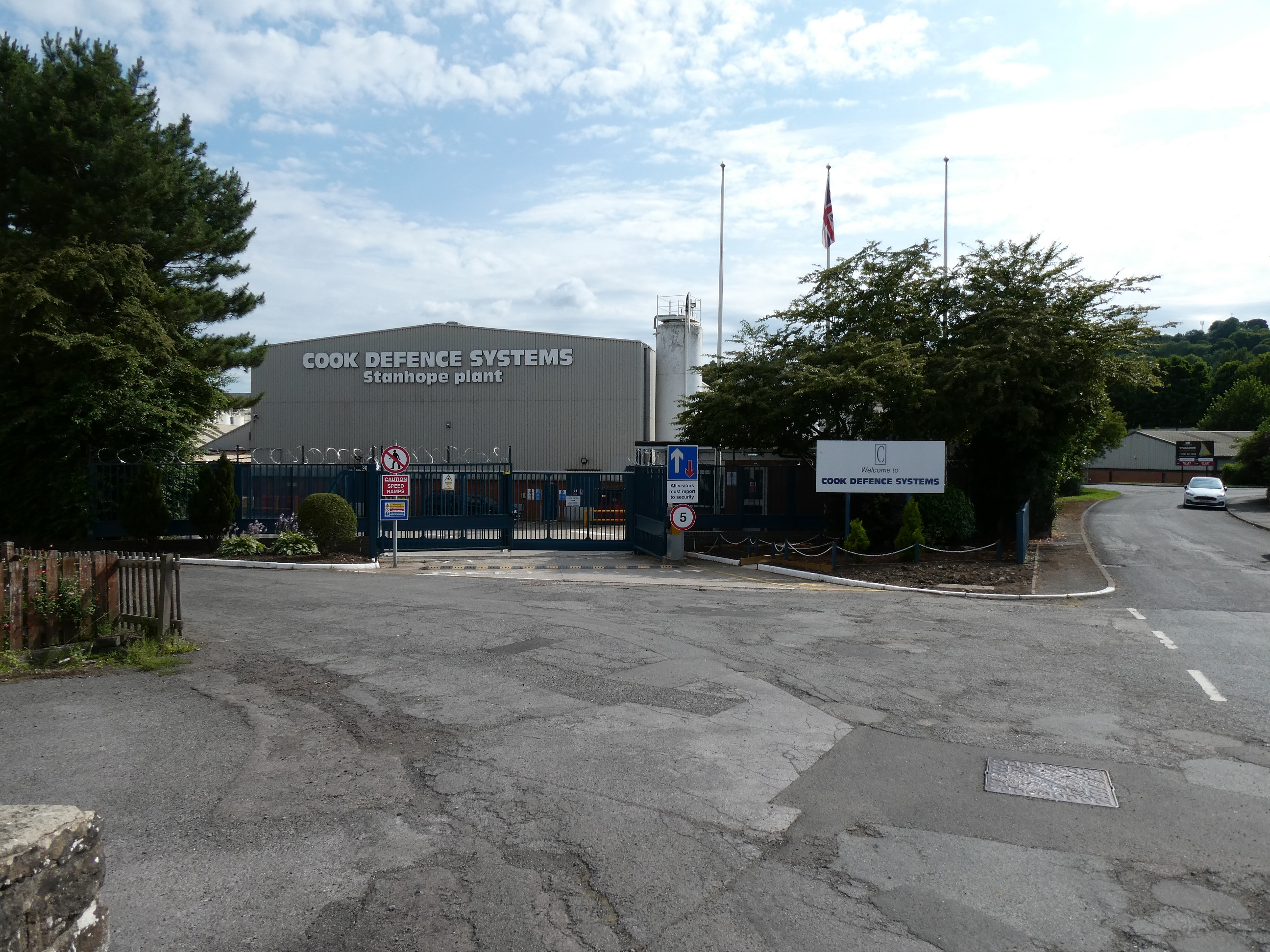
Cook Defence Systems, Stanhope

In 2014, the William Cook group was recognised as one of Yorkshire's Fastest 50 - a list of the fifty fastest growing companies in the region. In 2015, the British Secretary of State for Defence, the Rt Hon Michael Fallon, announced that the Ministry of Defence had awarded Cook Defence Systems a four-year, £70 million deal to supply spare tracks for the British Army's in-service armoured vehicles. This was followed in 2016 by Cook Defence Systems securing a £30m contract with General Dynamics to supply tracks for the British Army's new AJAX armoured vehicle. In 2016, the Group joined the University of Sheffield Advanced Manufacturing Research Centre (AMRC) as a research partner. During the Russo-Ukrainian War Cook Defence Systems manufactured track for Soviet-built equipment for use by Ukraine.
