= The British-Swiss Chamber of Commerce =

Non-profit organization from Liechtenstein

The British-Swiss Chamber of Commerce (BSCC)
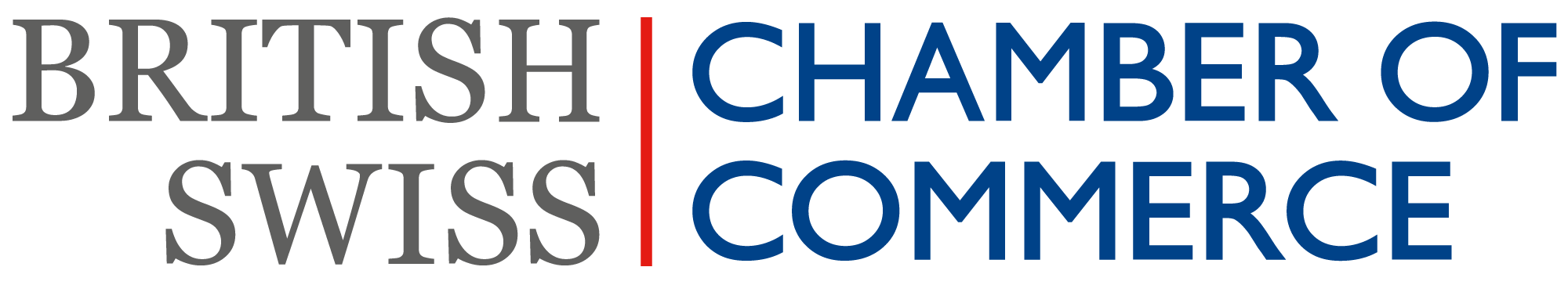
- Formation: 14 July 1920
- Purpose: Promotion of economic relations between UK and CH
- Headquarters: Zurich, Switzerland
- Key people: Inga Beale, President
- Website: https://bscc.co.uk/

The British-Swiss Chamber of Commerce (BSCC) is an independent not-for-profit organisation founded in 1920 with more than 500 members. It aims to improve business relations between Switzerland, Liechtenstein, and the UK. The BSCC is a forum for debate and networking. The BSCC is composed of corporate, SME, and individual members, who are categorized into four groups, called network, promote, lead, and influence. BSCC members represent the majority of business sectors. Its activities include organising events, providing advisory services and creating a platform for the exchange of information and experience between Switzerland and the UK.

The BSCC is also divided into geographical chapters. These are active in Basel, Bern, Central Switzerland, Geneva, Liechtenstein, Ticino, the United Kingdom, and Zürich. The BSCC has special interest groups covering public affairs, legal, and tax. The BSCC also provides training, workshops, and panel discussions.

== Foundation and development ==
The British-Swiss Chamber of Commerce (BSCC) was founded in Bern on 14 July 1920. It was founded when economic relations between Switzerland and the United Kingdom intensified. The Chamber was created in response to growing trade relations and the need for institutionalised support for businesses in both countries. Two years after its foundation, the BSCC had 320 members. This indicates an interest in supporting bilateral trade between Switzerland and the UK. The organisation was a platform for exchanging information and resources between companies from both countries. In the decades following its foundation, the BSCC was involved in the promotion of trade relations between Switzerland and the United Kingdom. It offered its members advisory services, networking events and information on market opportunities and regulatory developments in both countries. The organisation worked to reduce trade barriers and strengthen bilateral economic relations. Over the years, the BSCC has had to adapt to various political and economic changes, including the impact of the Second World War and the various stages of European integration. Despite these challenges, the Chamber has remained a stable factor in supporting economic relations between the two countries.

== Aims and objectives ==
A primary objective of the British-Swiss Chamber of Commerce (BSCC) is to promote trade and investment between the two countries. This includes supporting companies in developing new markets and facilitating access to existing markets. The Chamber works to identify and remove trade barriers and provides key market information and advisory services to its members.

The BSCC regularly organises events aimed at creating and strengthening networks between business people from both countries. These events provide platforms for the exchange of best practices, the discussion of current economic and political issues and the promotion of business opportunities. The Chamber organises around 30 such events each year, covering a wide range of topics relevant to the Anglo-Swiss business community.

The BSCC supports its members in regulatory and market-specific matters. This includes providing information on legal and tax changes that may affect companies doing business in or with the other country. The organisation works with governments and other relevant institutions to consider the interests of its members.

A recent example of the BSCC's efforts is the promotion of mutual recognition of financial services between Switzerland and the UK. This commitment aims to facilitate market access for banks, insurance companies and other financial service providers. The Chamber supports the development of a framework that enables easy and efficient cross-border business.

The BSCC places great emphasis on educating and informing its members through seminars, workshops and information materials. These resources help members make informed decisions and adapt their business strategies in line with developments in the bilateral relationship. As an important voice for the business communities of both countries, the BSCC promotes the interests of its members at a political and economic level. It represents these interests to governments and international organisations to promote and maintain a favourable business environment.

== Membership and services ==
Membership of the British-Swiss Chamber of Commerce (BSCC) is open to companies and individuals interested in promoting and supporting bilateral trade relations between Switzerland and the UK. Members benefit from a variety of services and opportunities aimed at supporting their business growth and expanding their networks. The Chamber regularly organises networking events in the UK and Switzerland, allowing members to meet, share experiences and find potential business partners. The BSCC offers its members access to specialised knowledge and advice in areas such as law, tax and finance through its interest groups, such as the Public Affairs Commission (PAC) and the Legal & Tax Group. Members can participate in a variety of events, including workshops, dialogues with influential figures and field trips, which are regularly organised by the Chamber's local groups and interest groups.

== Importance and influence ==
The British-Swiss Chamber of Commerce (BSCC) promotes dialogue and cooperation between the financial centres of Switzerland and the United Kingdom. As highlighted in a report by the Swiss Bankers Association (SBA), the Chamber organises events to discuss the potential for both countries in the financial sector. The organisation is involved in efforts to reach an agreement on the mutual recognition of financial market regulation and supervisory frameworks between the two countries. Its activities are aimed at facilitating market access for financial institutions such as banks, asset managers, insurance companies and financial market infrastructures.

The BSCC promotes trade and investment between Switzerland and the UK. Through networking events, advisory services and market analyses, it supports companies from both countries in opening up new markets and expanding their business relationships. The organisation's activities are aimed at reducing trade barriers and facilitating bilateral trade.

The BSCC provides a platform for the exchange of knowledge, best practices and experience between companies and professionals from Switzerland and the UK. Its regular events, seminars and workshops enable members to network, exchange ideas and learn from the experiences of others. This networking promotes cooperation and knowledge transfer between the two countries.

The BSCC represents the interests of its members at a political and economic level. It works closely with governments and other relevant institutions to promote a favourable business environment for its members. Through its advocacy work, the Chamber influences the design of trade agreements, regulations and policies that affect bilateral economic relations.

By strengthening bilateral trade and investment relations, the BSCC contributes to the economic development of both Switzerland and the UK. By helping companies to access new markets and expand their business activities, the Chamber promotes economic growth, employment and innovation in both countries.

== Organisation ==
An elected president and a secretary-general head up the organisation. The Swiss Ambassador in London and the British Ambassador in Bern are also Honorary Presidents.

The BSCC team is made up of more than 100 people in Switzerland and the UK, of whom the major are volunteers. Most are representatives of member companies and are active in the chamber's various parts:

- councillors review the executive operations and constitute the governing body of the BSCC
- the executive board oversees operational matters and drives BSCC's strategy
- Chapter committee members act as local brand ambassadors and provide ideas for events
- the public affairs commission identifies political and economic issues of bilateral interest
- a European task force provides insight into relevant trends and developments.

The president since February 2022 has been Dame Inga Beale, a former chief executive of Lloyd's of London.

The BSCC is one of the 40 members of the Council of British Chambers of Commerce in Europe (COBCOE), which represents British chambers of commerce in 37 countries.
