= OT-64 SKOT =

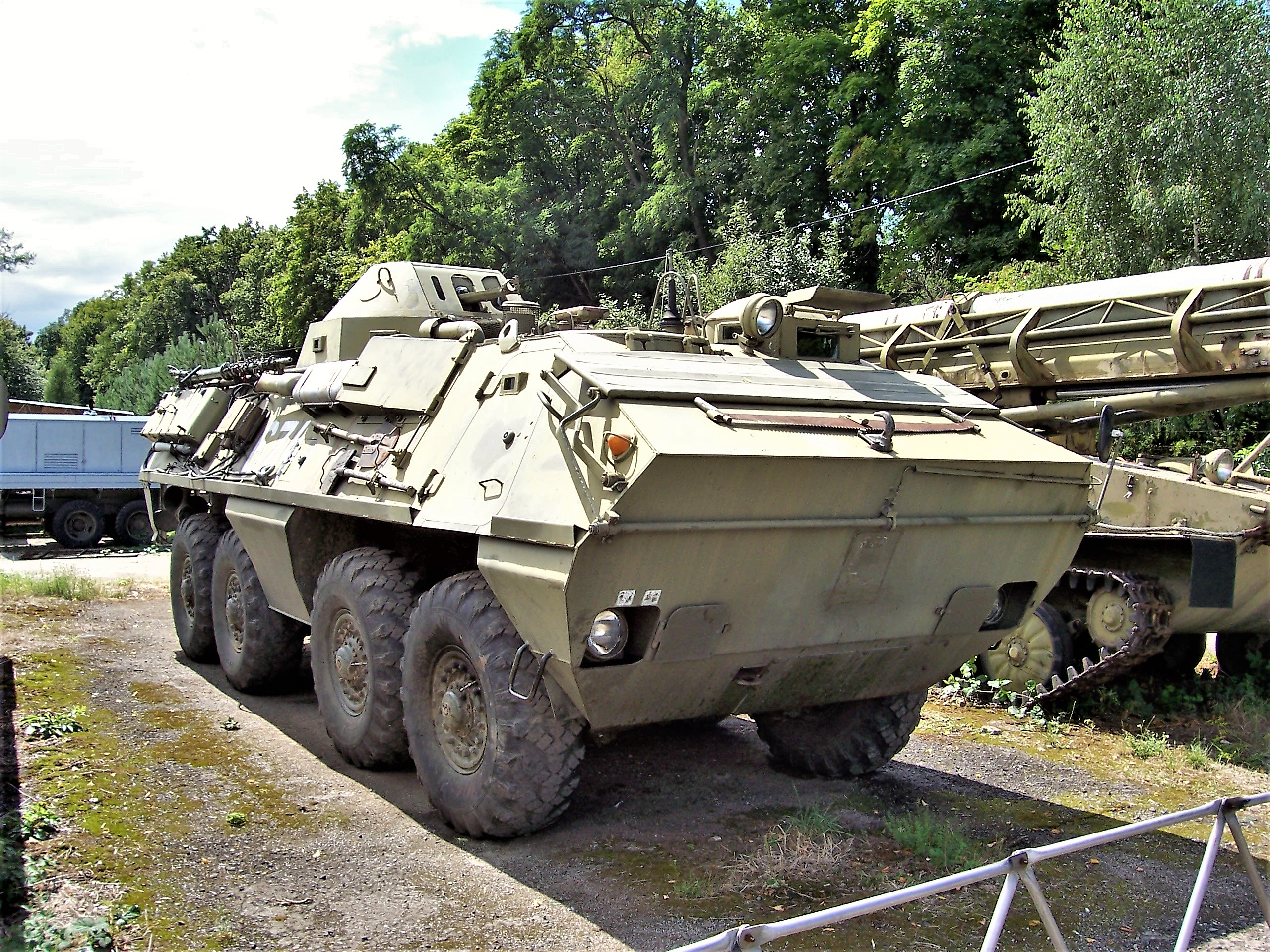
- OT-64A SKOT-2A
- Type: Wheeled amphibious armored personnel carrier
- Place of origin: Czechoslovakia; Poland

Service history
- In service: 1963–present
- Used by: See Operators
- Wars: Indo-Pakistani War of 1971; Western Sahara War; Uganda–Tanzania War; Iran–Iraq War; Operation Blue Star; Insurgency in Punjab, India; Syrian civil war; Russo-Ukrainian War; Russian invasion of Ukraine

Production history
- Designed: 1959
- Manufacturer: Fabryka Samochodów Ciężarowych (FSC) (Polish People's Republic)
- Unit cost: $53,000 (vehicle's unit price for Morocco in 1967)
- Produced: 1963 – early 1970s
- No. built: 4,500
- Variants: See Variants

Specifications
- Mass: 14.5 t
- Length: 7.44 m
- Width: 2.55 m
- Height: 2.71 m
- Crew: 2 + 18 passengers 2 + 10 passengers (OT-64A and SKOT-2A)
- Armor: 6-13 mm
- Main armament: 7.62 mm PKT machine gun and 14.5 mm KPV machine gun.
- Engine: air-cooled Tatra T-928-14 V-8 diesel 177 hp
- Power/weight: 12.4 hp/tonne
- Suspension: 8×8 or 8×4
- Operational range: 710 km
- Maximum speed: 94 km/h (in water 9 km/h)

The OT-64 SKOT (Czech acronym for: Střední Kolový Obrněný Transportér, and/or Polish Średni Kołowy Opancerzony Transporter – medium wheeled armoured transporter) is an amphibious armored personnel carrier (8×8), developed jointly by the Polish People's Republic (PRL) and Czechoslovakia (ČSSR) well into the 1960s.

Thanks to its innovative design, the OT-64 SKOT was at the forefront of armored personnel carriers in the world at the time. It surpassed its competitors, such as the British Alvis Saracen and the Soviet BTR-60 in many ways. It was not until the 1970s that french VAB and TPz Fuchs became its real competition. It is still used in foreign missions, mostly as a medical version.

Until the early 1970s Czechoslovakia and the Polish People's Republic produced around 4,500 OT-64 SKOTs of all variants, just under a third of which were exported. In 2002, the modernization of the SKOT transporter began in Poland. The work resulted in the KTO Ryś prepared by Wojskowe Zakłady Mechaniczne No. 5 from Poznań.

== History ==
The OT-64 was intended to replace the halftrack OT-810, which was nearly identical to the German Sd.Kfz. 251 from World War II. The first prototype was built in 1959. In 1961 the first sample series were built. From October 1963 the vehicles were produced in Lublin, Poland by Fabryka Samochodów Ciężarowych. The Polish plant acted as an assembly plant. Components of the propulsion system and power transmission, Tatra engine, Praga transmission and chassis, were imported from Czechoslovakia.

Armored hulls and turrets (Huta in Ostrowiec Świętokrzyski and Huta Częstochowa), elements of the suspension system (Huta Stalowa Wola) and on-board armaments (Zakłady Mechaniczne in Tarnów) were manufactured in Poland. Production ended in July 1971. Of the 4,500 OT-64s produced, 2,500 were obtained by the Polish army, and 2,000 by the Czechoslovak army. They were also acquired by the Hungarian army. Later, after introducing the BMP-1 infantry fighting vehicles into service, SKOT transporters were exported to other countries. Today, they are gradually being replaced by newer vehicles.

== Technology ==
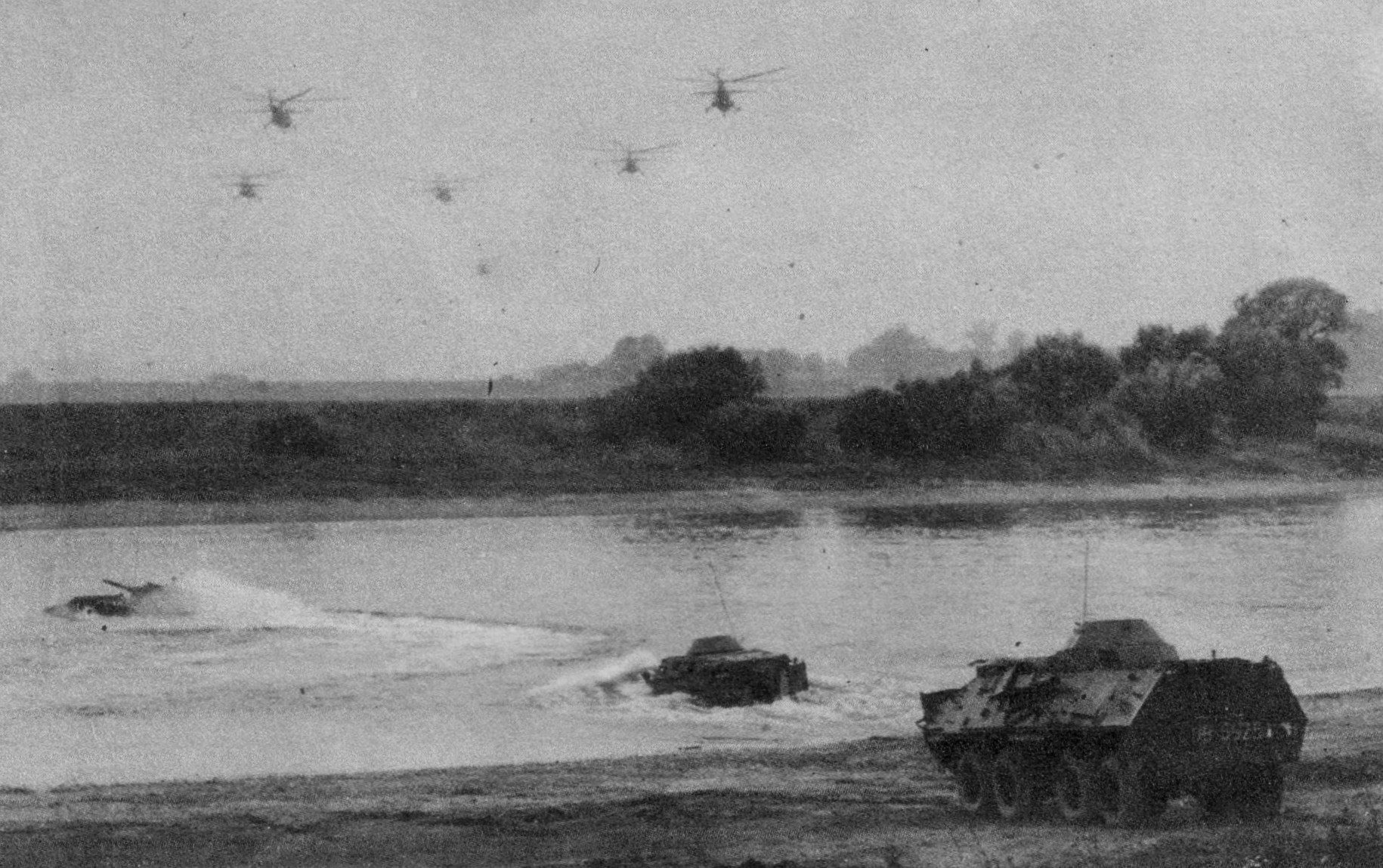
A OT-64 SKOT in an amphibious assault exercise

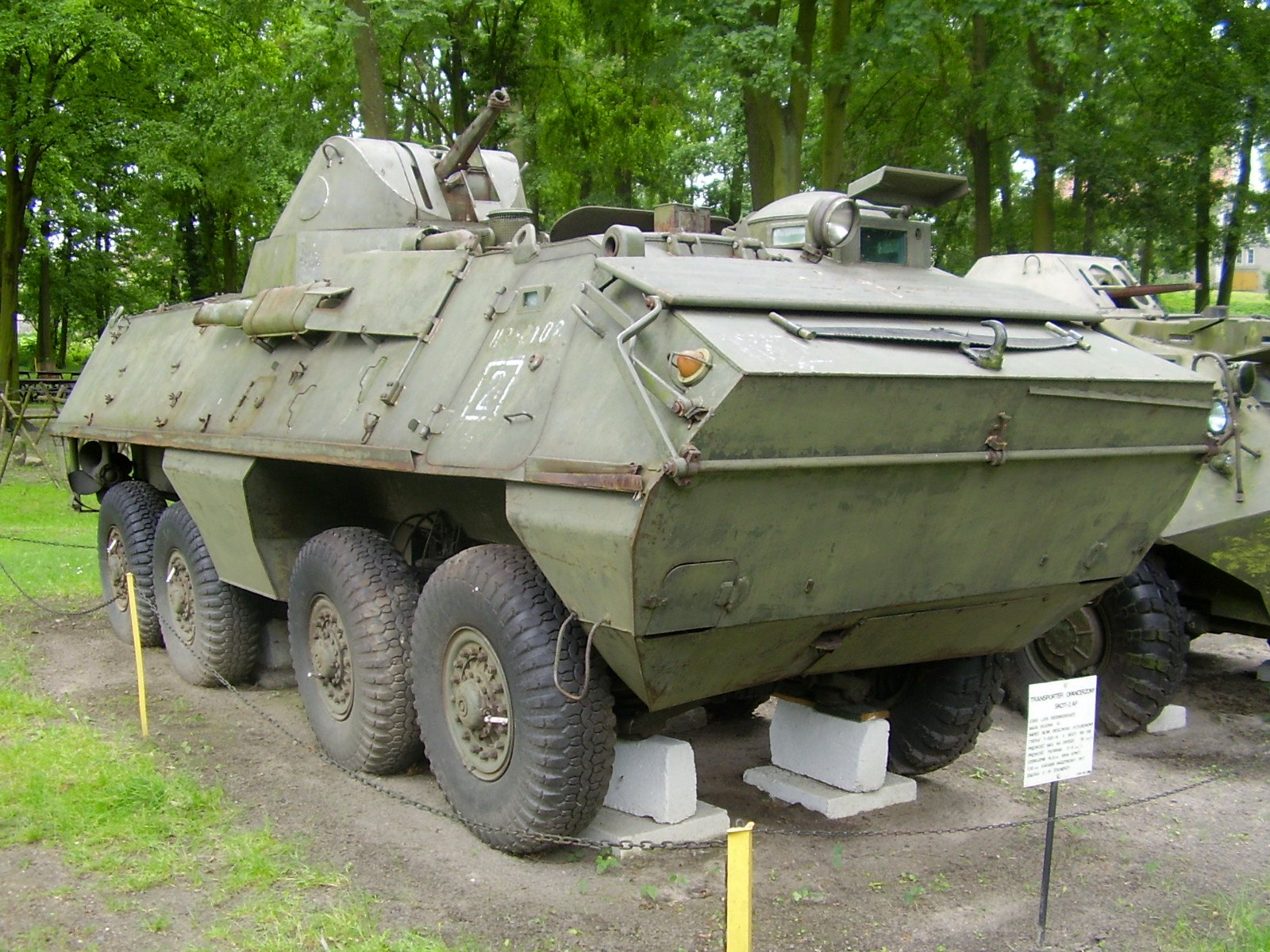
A SKOT-2AP

The OT-64's engine, transmission, suspension and axles were produced in Czechoslovakia. The engine was produced by Tatra. The gearbox was manufactured by Praga Hostivař. It has a pre-select Praga-Wilson gearbox, 5 forward +1 reverse gears. A gear is selected using the gear stick. When the gear is required the left pedal, gear change action/clutch combined, is pressed to the floor, giving a hiss of air sound. On release of the pedal the dry plate clutch engages after about half the return spring controlled movement.

The drive then passes to an auxiliary gearbox with low, neutral and high ratios which needs to be selected before moving off, for road/neutral/off-road use. This gives option to the driver of 10 forward and 2 reverse ratios. The gear change pedal is hydraulic and on action opens an air valve which causes the selected gear to engage. The armored hull and weapons were produced in Poland.

The OT-64 was the answer to the Soviet BTR-60. Contrary to this, the OT-64 used a diesel set in place of a petrol engine. That diminished the danger of fire and at the same time increased the range. The main advantage in relation to the Russian counterpart was the full-armored interior. The entrance is at the rear of the vehicle via twin doors. The OT-64 has NBC protection facility and night-vision equipment. It has central inflation for all wheels which can be controlled by the driver. The OT-64 is air-transportable and amphibious, with two propellers installed at the back.

Several variants were built. Some OT-64 were re-equipped for air defense or built as tank hunters. The latter used the AT-3 Sagger missile as a weapon.

== Service history ==
OT-64 SKOT entered service with Polish and Czechoslovak armies in 1963. It was produced until the early 1970s. It is still in service in Poland and Slovakia, among other operated by the Slovak police. Czech units were replaced in 2006 by new armoured vehicles Pandur II CZ.

During the 1990s, Slovakia purchased hundreds of these units from the Czech Republic (150 in 1994, 100 in 1998). Slovaks then sold them to mainly African countries. The OT-64 SKOT was exported to eleven countries. The total number of vehicles produced was 4,500.

== Variants ==
=== Czechoslovakia ===
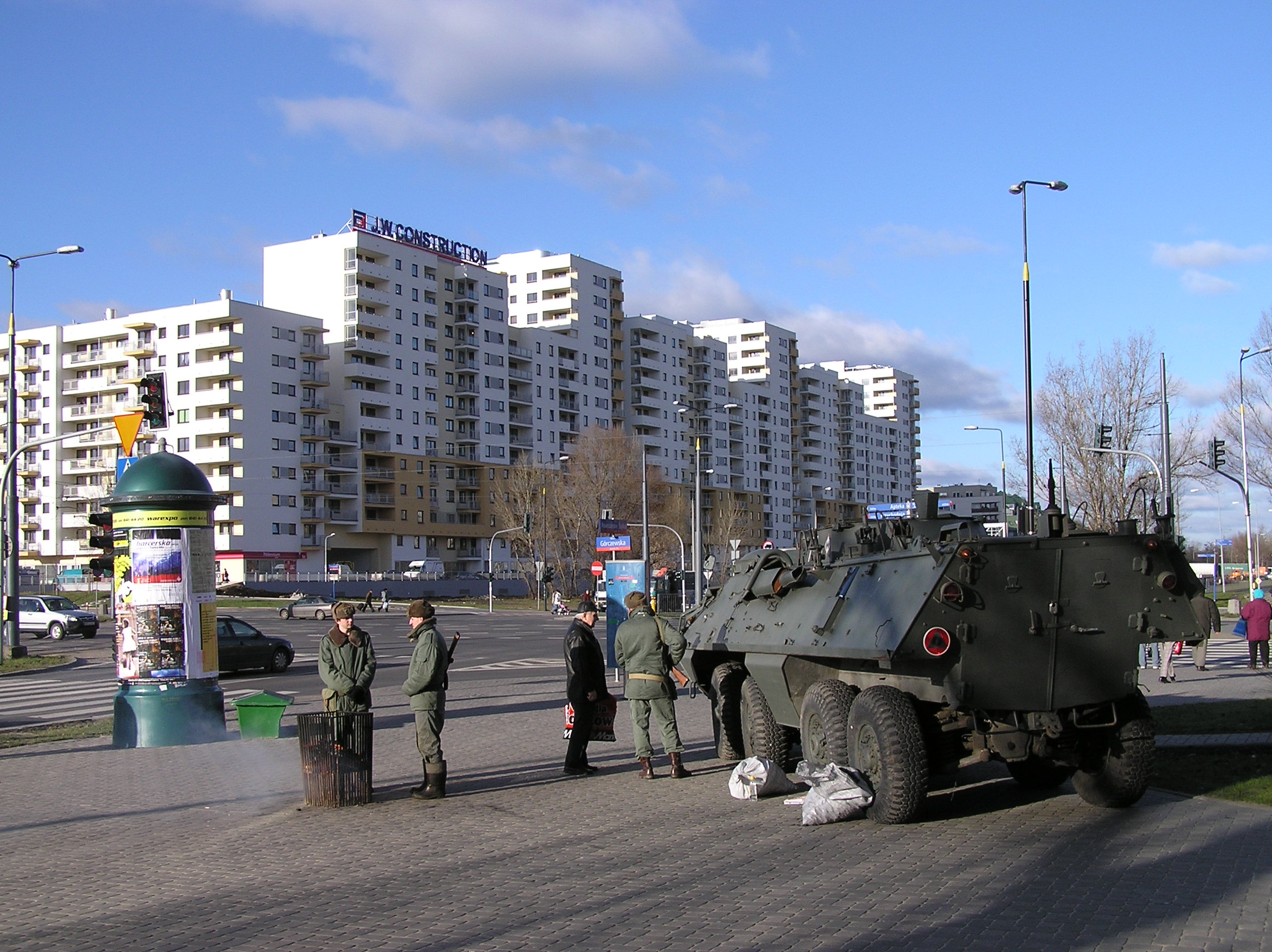
SKOT-1A during reconstruction of Martial law in Poland. Warsaw, 13.12.2007 (in memory of 13.12.1981)

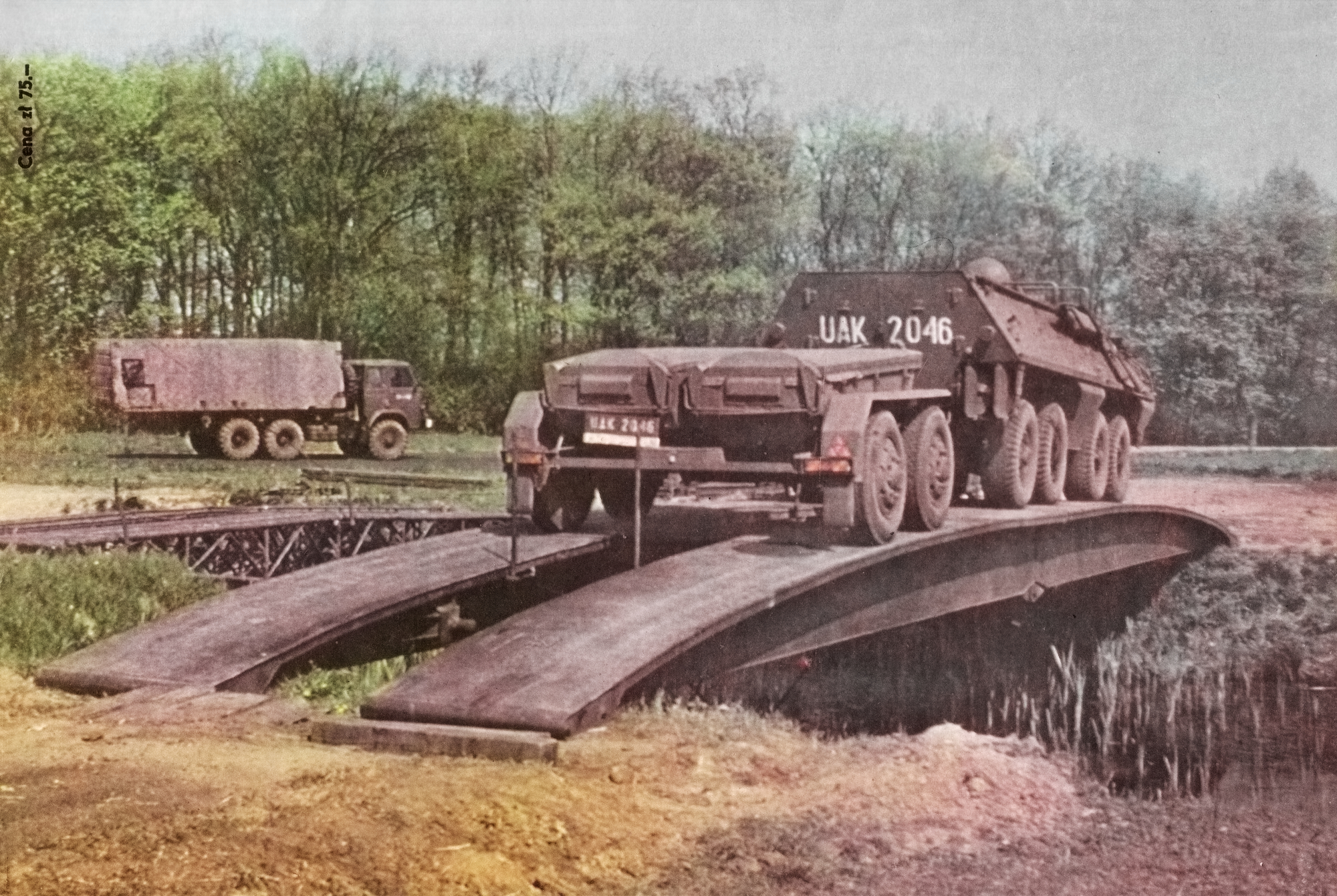
Polish SKOT S-260 Inż towing a trailer crossing a tank launched bridge

- OT-64 - Original version, used in the APC role. Early models were unarmed but later the vehicle was fitted with a pintle-mounted 7.62 mm light machine gun or 12.7 mm DShK 1938/46 heavy machine gun. They used to be known in the West as respectively OT-64A and OT-64B. Some 12.7 mm DShK 1938/46 heavy machine gun armed OT-64 APCs had shields around the heavy machine gun mount.
  - OT-64 fitted with a small turret from OT-65A. However this one is armed with twin machine guns and doesn't have the 82mm T-21 "Tarasnice" recoilless gun.
  - DTP-64 (dilna technicke pomoci) - Czech repair version with tow bars, welding equipment and a hand-operated crane with a capacity of 1 tonne. There were two sub-versions, namely the DTP-64/M for mechanized infantry units and the DTP-64/T for tank units.
  - OT-64 ZDRAV or ZDR-64 (zdravotni): ambulance.
  - OT-64A - Improved version fitted with BPU-1 turret from Soviet BRDM-2 armoured scout car which is armed with a 14.5 mm KPVT heavy machine gun and 7.62 mm PKT coaxial machine gun. In Western sources, this version is often called OT-64C. In the late 1990s, some vehicles had the turret replaced by a pintle-mounted machine gun for peacekeeping operations. The OT-64A is used as the basis for several command vehicles (velitelsko štábní obrněný transportér) fitted with multiple radio sets, a 1 kW generator and an antenna mast:
    - VSOT-64/R2 R102 - Unarmed signals and command variant.
    - VSOT-64/R2 R105 - Unarmed signals and command variant.
    - VSOT-64/R2 R108 - Unarmed signals and command variant.
    - VSOT-64/R2M - Signals and command variant with OT-64A's turret.
    - VSOT-64/R3 - Unarmed signals and command variant.
    - VSOT-64/R3MT - Unarmed signals and command variant.
    - VSOT-64/R4MT - Unarmed signals and command variant.
    - VSOT-64/R4RT - Unarmed signals and command variant.
    - OT-64A fitted with the ATGM mounts on the turret sides.
    - OT-64A fitted with the new turret with higher elevation for armament. Similar to Polish SKOT-2AP.
    - OT-93 - Export version of the OT-64A with the original turret replaced by the one from the OT-65M or OT-62B. The armament consists of a single 7.62mm machine-gun.
  - Cobra - Infantry combat vehicle version with a new turret with 30mm gun 2A42. Did not enter production

=== Poland ===
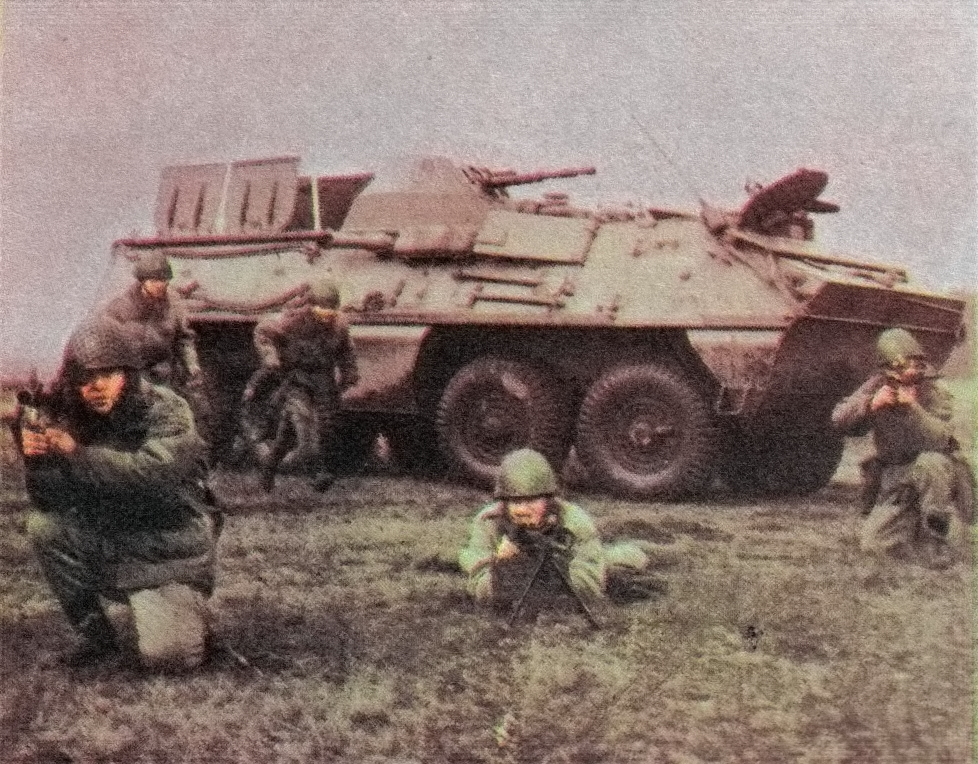
SKOT-2A

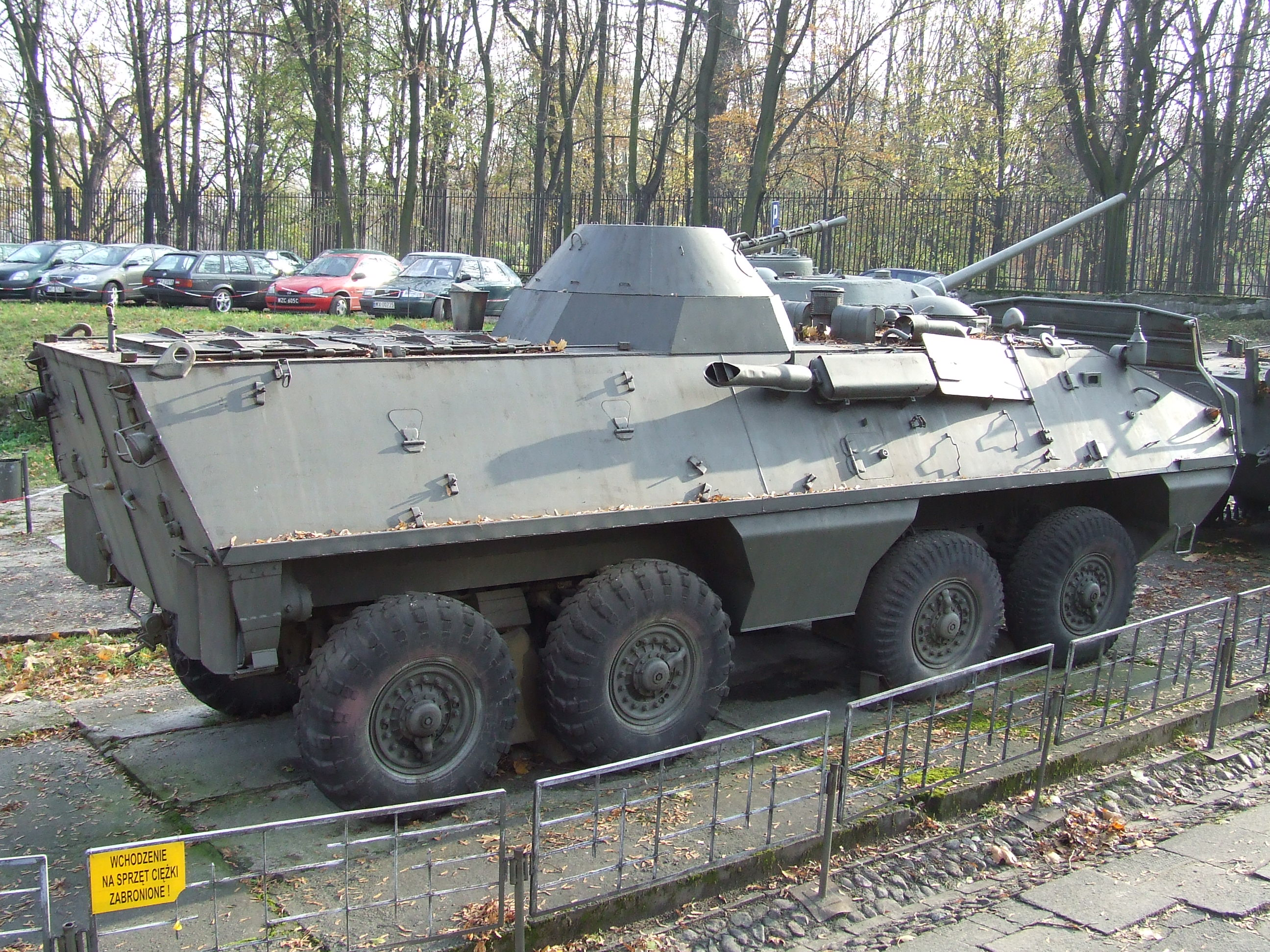
SKOT-2A at the Polish Army Museum (Muzeum Wojska Polskiego)

- SKOT-1 - Early, unarmed model, similar to the OT-64.
  - SKOT-1A - SKOT-1 fitted with a superstructure in the front of the troop compartment. The superstructure a large, two piece hatch.
    - SKOT R-3 - Unarmed command vehicle used by regiment and higher command. It is equipped with 4 radios, 1 radio receiver, 1 microwave radio relay and 1 radiotelephone. The vehicle is operated by seven man crew.
      - SKOT R-3M - Unarmed signals and command variant for combat engineer units.
      - SKOT R-3Z - SKOT R-3 with modernized radio equipment which it includes the second microwave radio relay.
    - SKOT R-4 - Unarmed command vehicle used by division and army command. It is equipped with 4 radios, 3 radio receivers and 3 radiotelephones.
    - SKOT-WPT (wóz pogotowia technicznego) - Technical support vehicle with a light crane.
    - SKOT S-260 Art (artyleryjski) - Artillery tractor and transport vehicle for ammunition and mortar or anti-tank squads.
    - SKOT S-260 Inż (inżynieryjny) - Fitted with racks for anti-tank mines and used to tow mechanical mine layers or mine-clearing systems.
    - SKOT-2 - SKOT-1A with pintle MG mount around the hatch of the superstructure. Two types of machine guns were fitted there, 7.62 mm light machine gun (first SGMT and later PKT) or 12.7 mm DShK 1938/46 heavy machine gun. Sides of the machine gun mount are protected with armour plates.
      - SKOT-2A - Polish designator for the version with the BRDM-2 turret which was designed in the late 1960s. The vehicle is fitted with conical turret armed with 14.5 mm KPV heavy machine gun and 7.62 mm PKT coaxial light machine gun on the top of the vehicle. Number of soldiers transported in the troop compartment went down from 18 to 10. In Western sources, this version is often called OT-64C.
        - SKOT 2AM - A small number of Polish SKOT-2A APCs was fitted with 9M14 Malyutka (AT-3 Sagger) ATGM launchers on the turret sides. The launchers were protected with armour plate or wire mesh. In the West, they were known as OT-64C(1A).
        - SKOT R-2 - Command vehicle used by battalion and regiment command. It is equipped with 4 radios: R-112, R-113 and 2 R-105. The vehicle is operated by seven man crew.
          - SKOT R-2AM - Unarmed command and fire control variant for artillery units.
          - SKOT R-2M - Signals and command variant with SKOT-2A's turret.
        - SKOT R-6 - Unarmed signals and command variant.
        - SKOT-2AP - Polish modification with a new anti-aircraft WAT turret armed with 14.5 mm heavy machine gun. The turret had higher elevation for its armament and therefore could be used to fire at air targets. The turret has the new CGS-90 sight. This vehicle was known in the West as OT-64C(2).
  - KTO WR-02 "Ryś" (KTO stands for Kołowy Transporter Opancerzony - Wheeled Armoured personnel Carrier) (Ryś - Lynx) - Heavily upgraded version with Iveco Cursor 8 engine. Work is performed by the 5th Military Mechanical Institute in Poznań.
    - KTO WR-02 "Ryś-2" (KTO stands for Kołowy Transporter Opancerzony - Wheeled Armoured personnel Carrier) (Ryś-2 - Lynx-2) - The export version of KTO WR-02 "Ryś".

=== Uruguay ===
- Vehículos acorazados de ruedas M64 - Uruguayan designation for OT-64 armed with a pintle-mounted machine gun.
- Vehículos acorazados de ruedas M93 - Uruguayan designation for OT-93.

=== India ===
- Insurgency in Punjab, India -
- Operation Blue Star

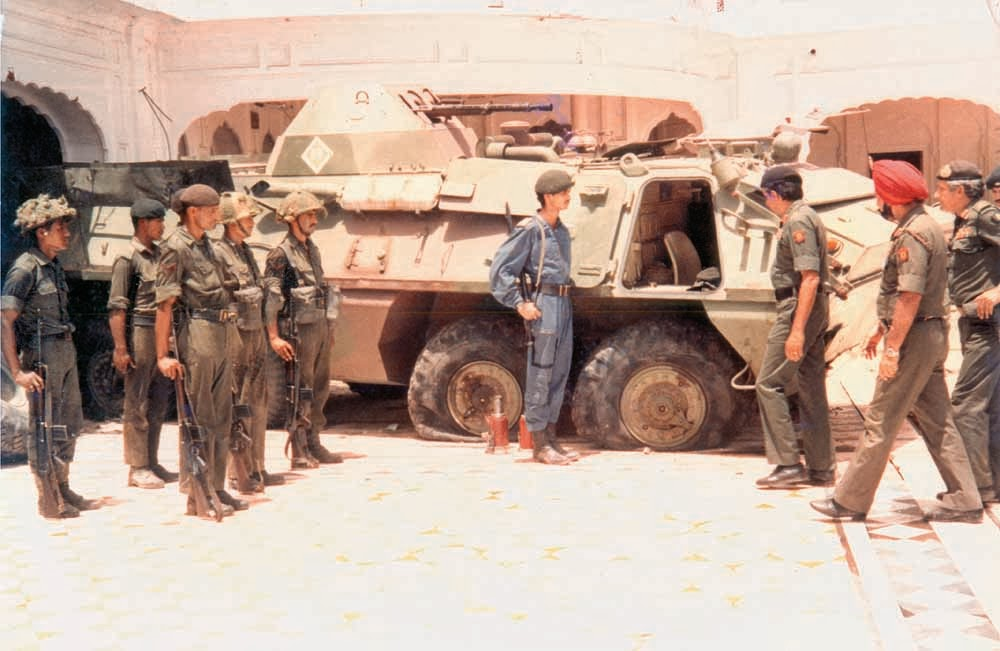
An OT-64 SKOT disabled by RPGs

== Operators ==
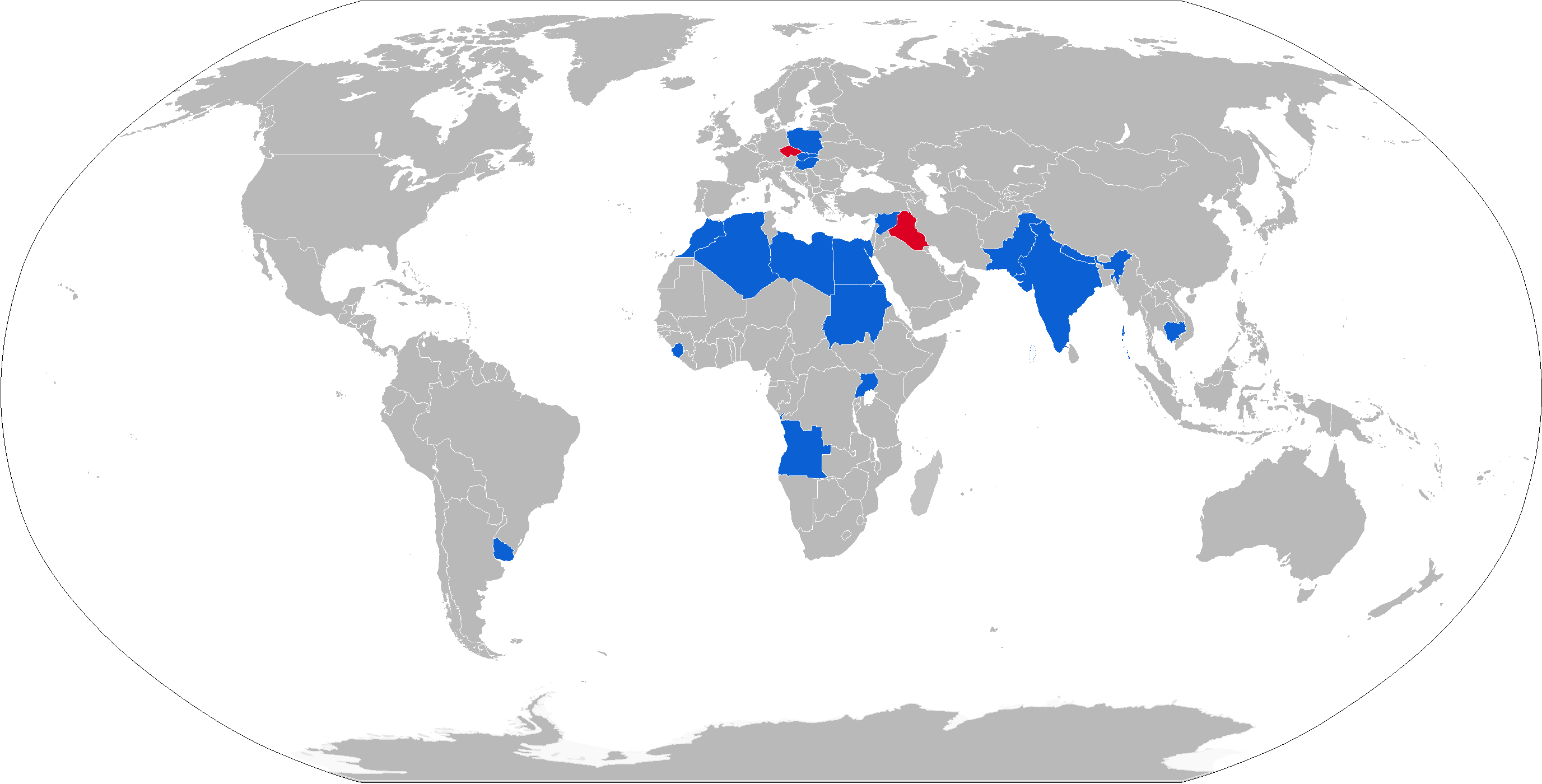
A map of OT-64 SKOT operators. Blue for current operators, red for former operators

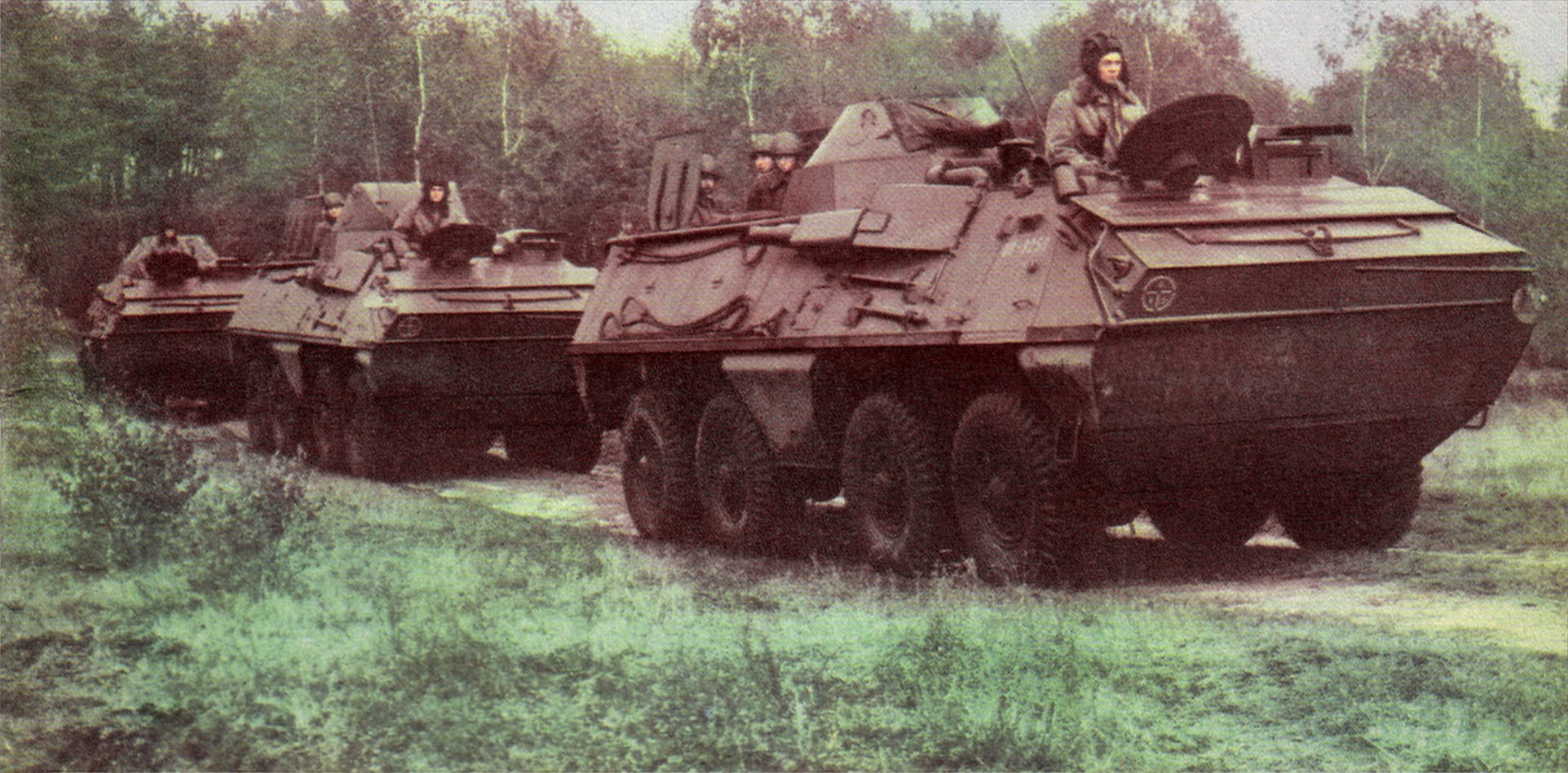
Two SKOT-2A APCs and one SKOT-2AP APC, Poland 1971

=== Current ===
- Algeria − 150 in service as of 2024, ex-Czechoslovak vehicles delivered via Slovakia
- Cambodia − 30 in service as of 2024, ex-Czechoslovak vehicles
- India − 157+ in service as of 2024
- Nepal − 8 in service as of 2024, ex-Czechoslovak vehicles
- Slovakia − Being replaced since 2018. 7 in service as of 2024
- Sudan − Unknown number in service as of 2024
- Uganda − Saw action in 1978 during the Uganda–Tanzania War. 4 in service as of 2024
- Ukraine − 1 purchased by the Ukrainian scout organization "Plast" for the 103rd Separate Territorial Defense Brigade.
- Uruguay − 53 OT-64 and 47 OT-93 in service as of 2024, ex-Czechoslovak vehicles

=== Former ===
- Angola − 9 OT-64A (version fitted with BRDM-2 turret) ordered from Slovakia in 1993 and delivered in 1994, the vehicles were previously in Czechoslovak service
- Czechoslovakia − Passed onto successor states
- Czech Republic − Czech units were put out of service in 2006 and were replaced by new armored vehicles Pandur II CZ. 60+ were stored in reserve in 2011
- Egypt − 200 OT-64A (version fitted with BRDM-2 turret) ordered from Czechoslovakia in 1968 and delivered between 1969 and 1970
- Iraq − 200 OT-64A (version fitted with BRDM-2 turret) ordered from Czechoslovakia in 1980 and delivered in 1981. All destroyed or scrapped.
- Libya − 50 OT-64A (version fitted with BRDM-2 turret) ordered from Czechoslovakia in 1973 and delivered in 1974
- Morocco − 95 OT-64A (version fitted with BRDM-2 turret) ordered from Czechoslovakia in 1968 and delivered between 1968 and 1970
- Pakistan − 6 OT-64A (version fitted with BRDM-2 turret) ordered from Slovakia in 1993 and delivered in 1993, the vehicles were previously in Slovak service
- Polish People's Republic − Replaced by the Patria AMV
- Sierra Leone − 10 OT-64 APCs armed with a pintle-mounted machine gun ordered from Slovakia in 1993 and delivered in 1994, the vehicles were previously in Slovak service
- Syria − 300 OT-64A (version fitted with BRDM-2 turret) ordered from Czechoslovakia in 1976 and delivered between 1977 and 1979
- United Nations − 8 ex-Czechoslovak vehicles in 2007 for peacekeeping missions in Haiti

=== Civilian operators ===
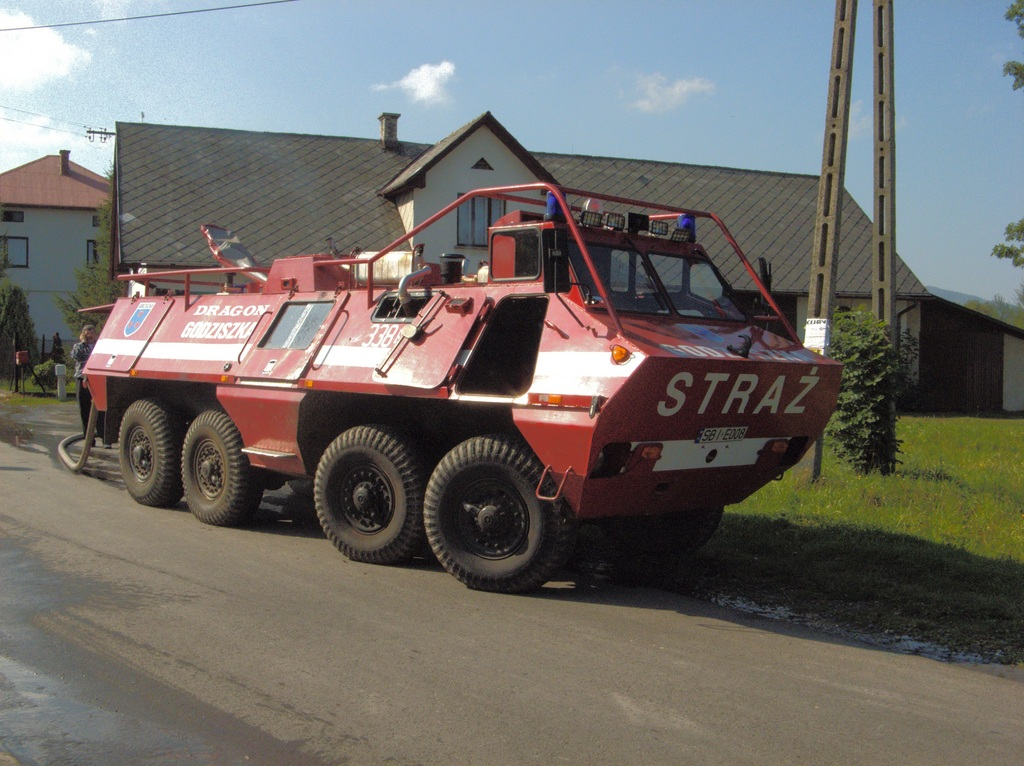
SKOT-1A-based firefighting vehicle

- At least 2 SKOT APCs, one in the Czech Republic and one in Poland, have been modified and are used as firefighting vehicles
- Many SKOT APCs in Poland and the Czech Republic were sold to private owners who make sure they are in working condition and regularly show them on military enthusiasts' meetings. Some private Czech OT-64s have number plates and can travel on public roads.

== Bibliography ==
- Foss, Christopher F, ed. (2011). Jane's Armour and Artillery 2011–2012 (32nd ed.). Surrey: Janes Information Group. ISBN 978-0-71062-960-9.
- International Institute for Strategic Studies (2024). The Military Balance 2024. Taylor & Francis. ISBN 978-1-040-05115-3.
- Kajetanowicz, Jerzy. Polish Fighting Vehicles in Post-war period.
- Magnuski, Janusz. Wozy Bojowe LWP 1943-1983 (in Polish). Wydawnictwo Ministerstwa Obrony Narodowej. ISBN 83-11-06990-5.
- Technika Wojska Polskiego (in Polish). Dom Wydawniczy Bellona. 1998.

== Literature ==
- Trewhitt, Philip (2005). Tank (in German). Klagenfurt: Neuer Kaiser Verlag. ISBN 3-7043-3197-X.
