= KTO Ryś =

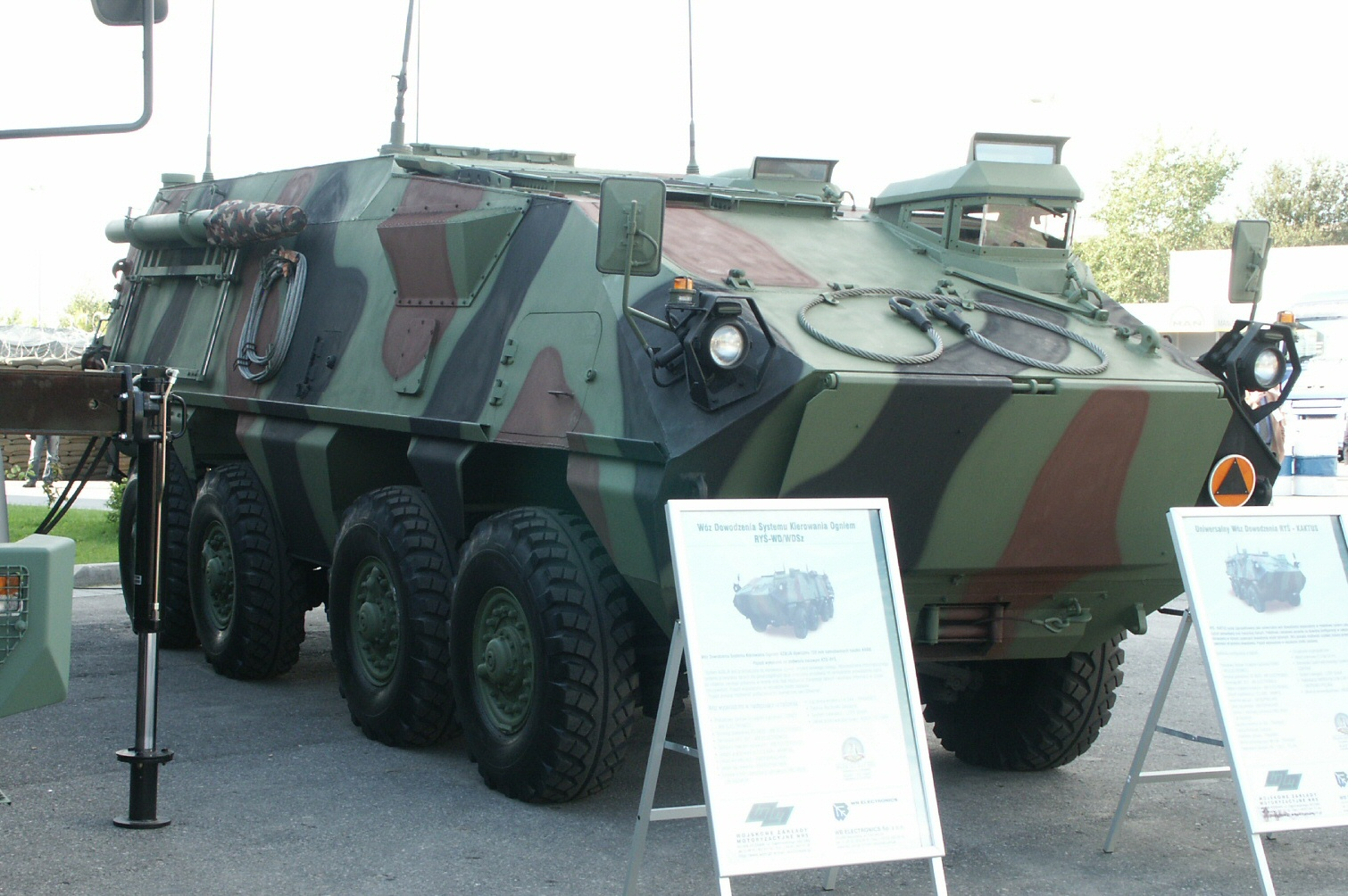
- Place of origin: Poland

Service history
- Used by: Polish Land Forces

Specifications
- Mass: 16,500 kg (36,400 lb)
- Length: 7.43 m (24.4 ft)
- Width: 2.5 m (8 ft 2 in)
- Height: 2.69 m (8 ft 10 in)
- Crew: 3 + passengers
- Engine: Iveco Diesel; 259 kW (347 hp)
- Power/weight: 15.6 kW/t (21.2 PS/t) (max weight)
- Suspension: 8×8 wheeled
- Ground clearance: 0.4 m (1 ft 4 in)
- Operational range: 800 km (500 mi)
- Maximum speed: over 100 km/h (60 mph) on land up to 10 km/h (6 mph) in water

The KTO Ryś (KTO for Kołowy Transporter Opancerzony - lit. Wheeled Armored Vehicle; Ryś is Polish for Lynx) is 8x8 multi-role military vehicle produced by Wojskowe Zakłady Motoryzacyjne S.A. (formerly WZM No. 5), a Polish Armaments Group company. The vehicle was developed from the chassis and drive train of the OT-64 SKOT armored personnel carrier.

== Variants ==
=== KTO Ryś-Med ===
Armored ambulance vehicle with crew of 3, capable to transport maximum of 4 injured in stretched position. This variant was adopted by Polish land Forces and fielded in Iraq and Afghanistan.

=== KTO Azalia ===
(Azalia is Polish for Azalea) - artillery command vehicle designed for Krab howitzers units.

=== ZSRZ Kaktus ===
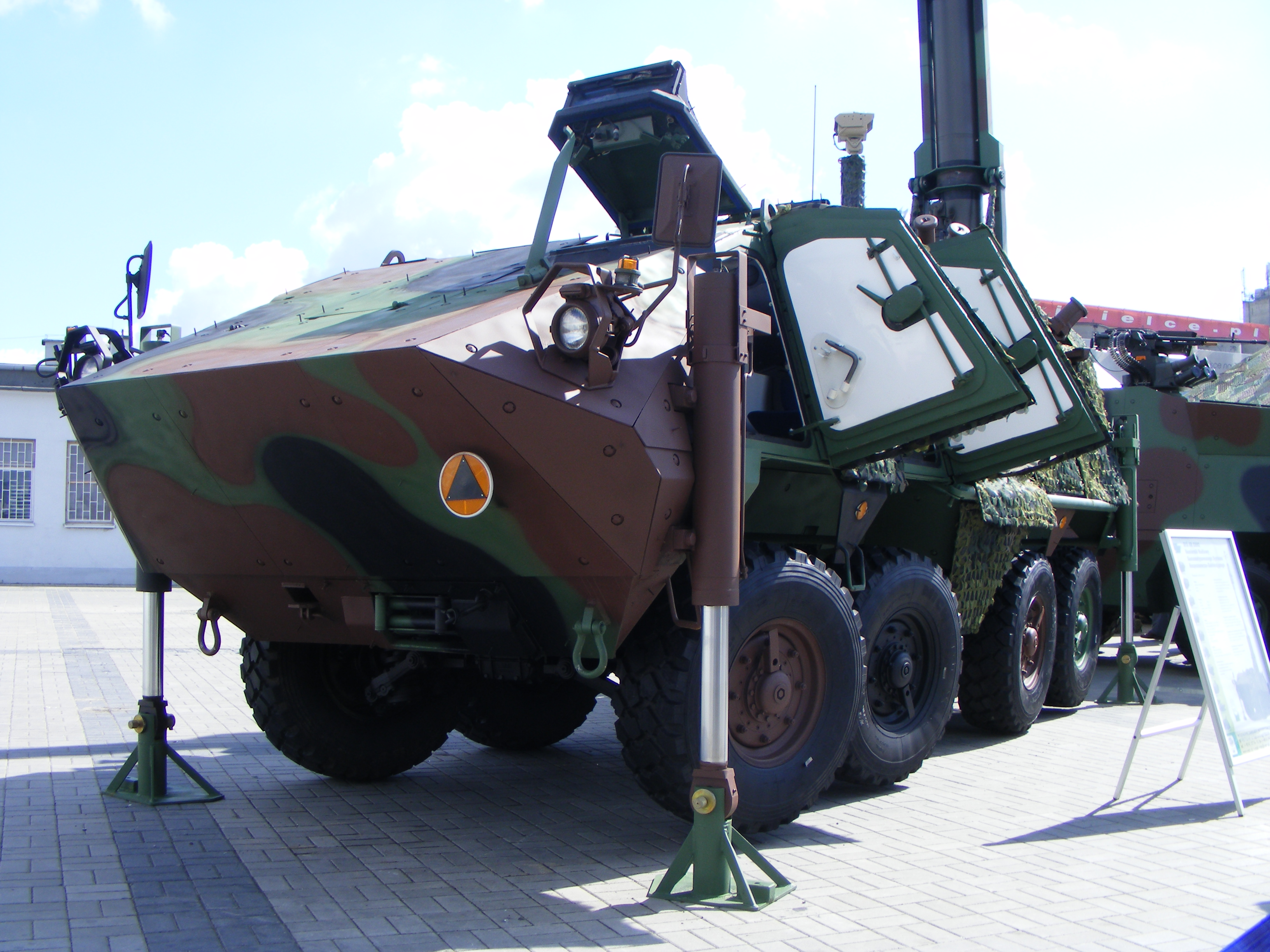
Kaktus

(ZSRZ for Zautomatyzowany System Rozpoznawczo-zakłócający - lit. Automatic Reconnaissance-Jamming System; Kaktus is Polish for Cactus) - electronic warfare system based on KTO Ryś.

=== KTRI Tuja ===
(KTRI for Kołowy Transporter Rozpoznania Inżynieryjnego - lit. Wheeled Engineering Reconnaissance Vehicle; Tuja is Polish for Thuja) - wheeled engineering vehicle.

=== KTO Irbis ===
Irbis is a 6x6 variant of Ryś armored personnel carrier.

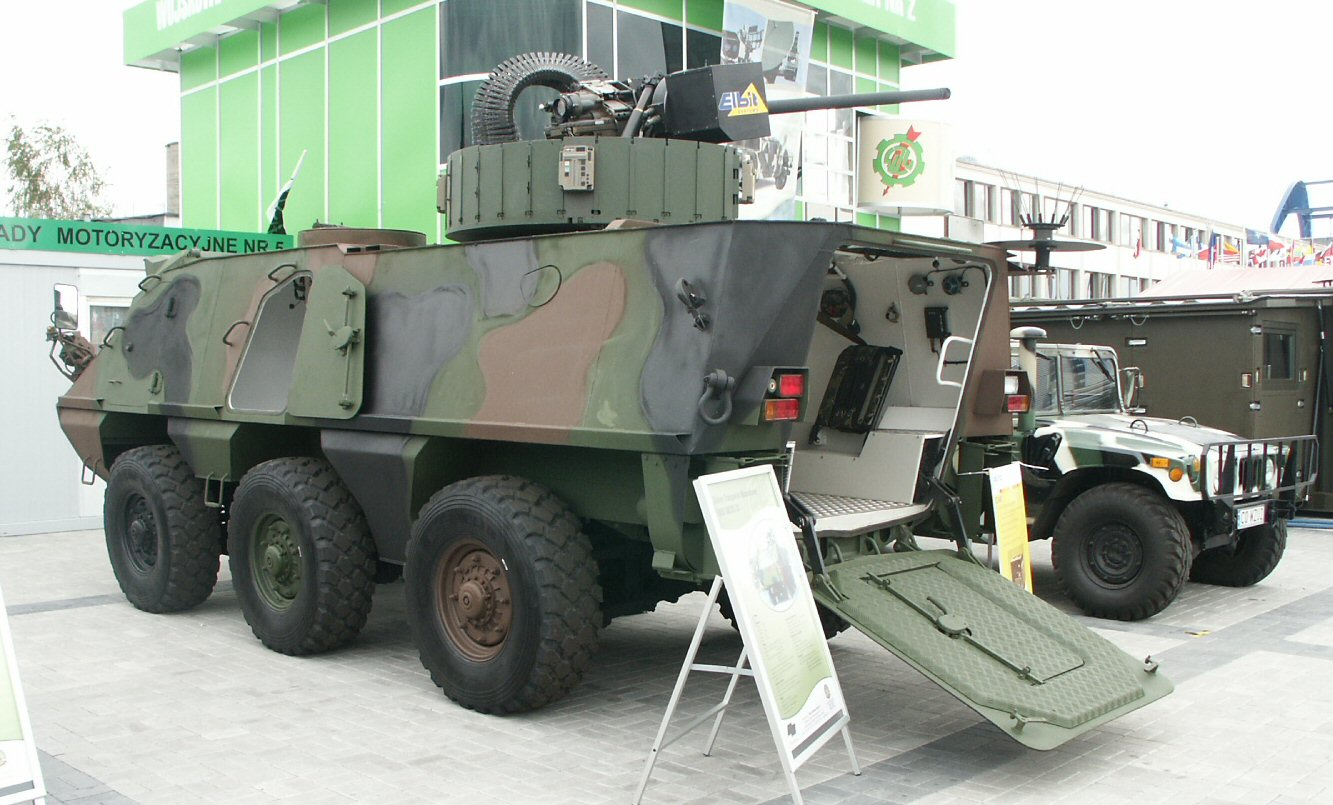
KTO Irbis- 6x6 variant with RWS delivered by Elbit

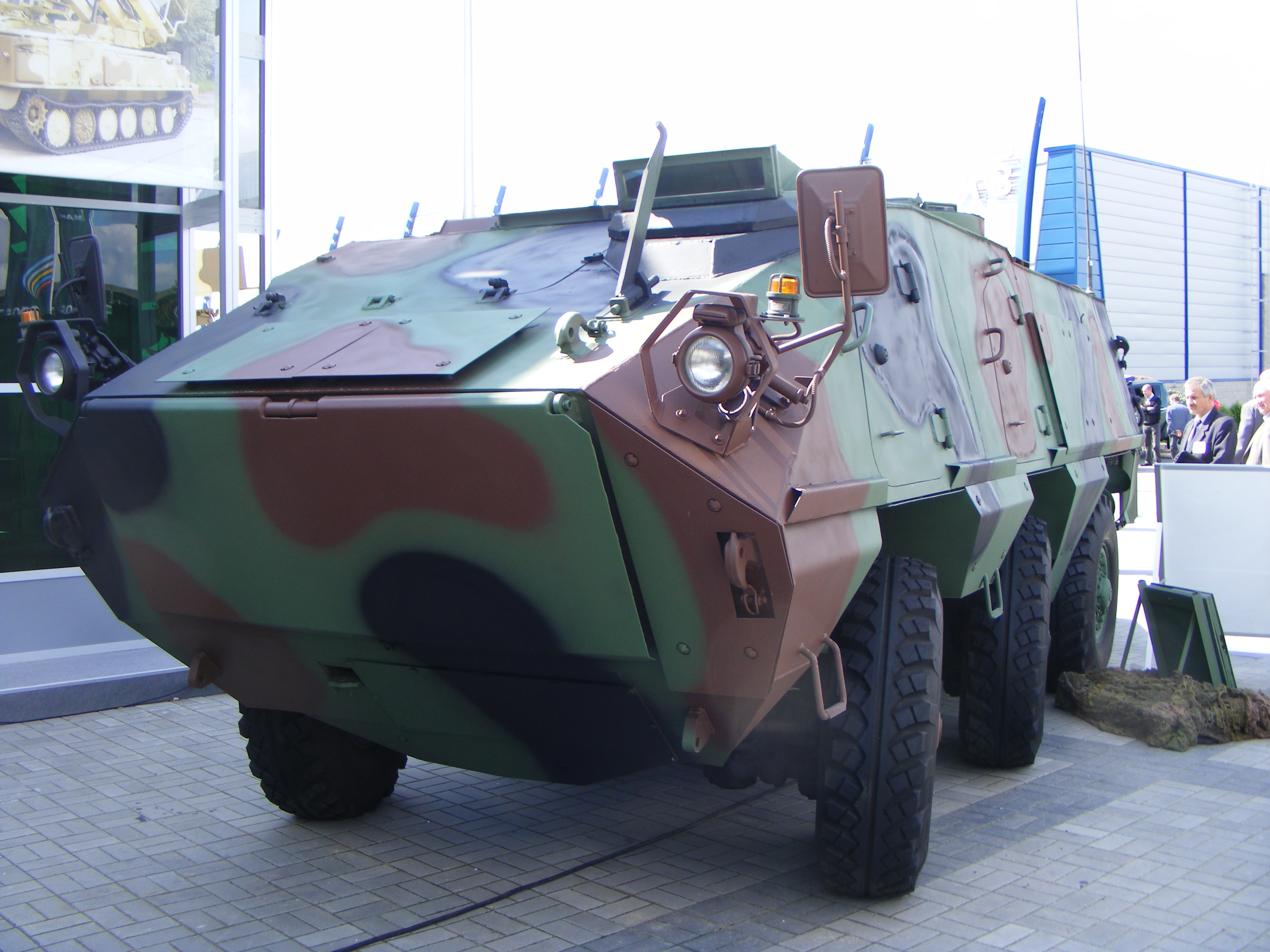
KTO Irbis- multi role military vehicle

=== Other ===
At early stages of development Ryś was presented in many variants like APCs and IFV with Reihmal E8 or Rafael RCWS-127 turrets, M98 mortar carrier and other. All those vehicles were based on early first generation of Ryś vehicles, much closer to original OT-64 SKOT, none of those vehicles were adopted, and the manufacturer no longer offers them.
