= Boxer (armoured fighting vehicle) =

Multinational wheeled armoured fighting vehicle

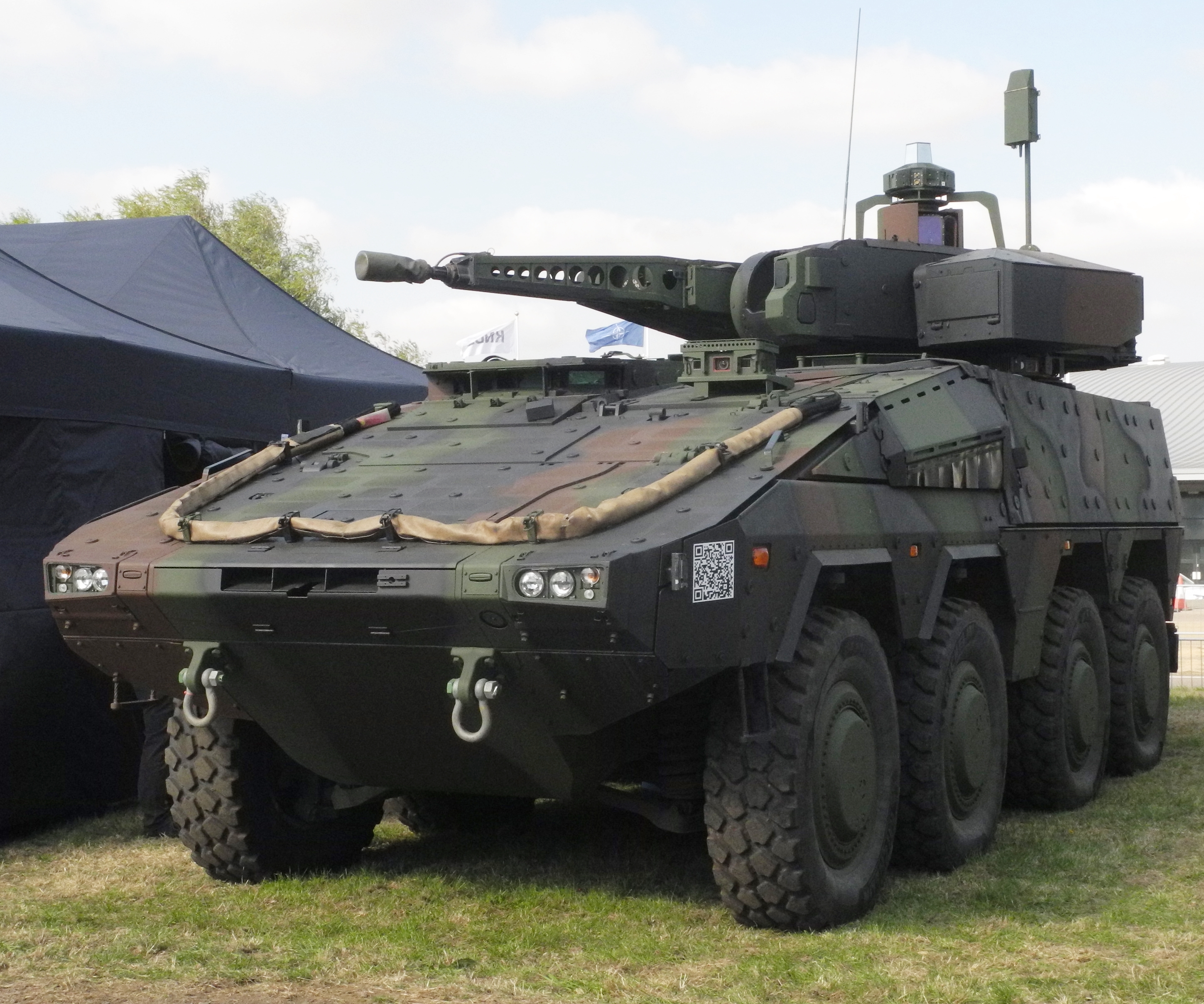
- The Boxer RCT30 IFV variant on display at DVD 2024.
- Type: Armoured fighting vehicle
- Place of origin: Germany / Netherlands /

Service history
- In service: Since 2011
- Used by: See Operators
- Wars: Afghanistan war (ISAF); Russo-Ukrainian War

Production history
- Designer: ARTEC GmbH
- Designed: 1998–2009
- Manufacturer: Rheinmetall; KNDS Deutschland
- Unit cost: APC €4 – 5 million; IFV €7 – 9 million
- Produced: 2009–present
- No. built: 1,866 as of February (deliveries and confirmed orders for which quantities are given:See Operators)

Specifications (see Specifications section)
- Crew: See Boxer variants and mission modules
- Main armament: See Boxer variants and mission modules

The Boxer is a family of armoured fighting vehicles designed by an international consortium to accomplish a number of operations through the use of installable mission modules. The governments participating in the Boxer programme have changed as the programme has developed. The Boxer vehicle is produced by the ARTEC GmbH (armoured vehicle technology) industrial group, and the programme is being managed by OCCAR (Organisation for Joint Armament Cooperation). ARTEC GmbH is based in Munich; its parent companies are KNDS Deutschland and Rheinmetall on the German side, (with Australian factory) and Rheinmetall Defence Nederland B.V. for the Netherlands. Overall, Rheinmetall has a 64% stake in the joint venture.

A distinctive and unique feature of the vehicle is its composition of a drive module and interchangeable mission modules which allow several configurations to meet different operational requirements. The drive module has been produced in the following build configurations: A0, A1, A2, A3 and an A2/A3 hybrid. These configuration changes are the result of improvements resulting primarily from the mission in Afghanistan, and modifications required by some users. The main changes are in protection levels (increased), uprated suspension to account for a weight increase, and the powerpack.

Other names in use or previously used for Boxer are GTK (Gepanzertes Transport-Kraftfahrzeug; armoured transport vehicle) Boxer and MRAV (Multi-Role Armoured Vehicle). GTK is the official Bundeswehr designation for Boxer. Confirmed Boxer customers as of February 2025 are Germany, the Netherlands, Lithuania, Australia, the UK, Ukraine, and Qatar.

== Production history ==
With exceptions for style and ease of reading, the following development and production history is presented in as near-chronological order as possible.

The Boxer started in 1993 as a joint venture design project between Germany and France, with the UK joining the project in 1996. In November 1999, a £70 million contract for eight prototype vehicles (four each, Germany and the UK) was awarded. France left the programme in 1999 to pursue its own design, the Véhicule Blindé de Combat d'Infanterie (VBCI). In February 2001, the Netherlands joined the programme and an additional four prototypes were built for the Netherlands. Boxer, then known as GTK/MRAV/PWV, was unveiled on 12 December 2002. The name Boxer was announced when the second prototype appeared. At this time the first production run was to have been 200 for each country.

The UK Ministry of Defence announced its intention to withdraw from the Boxer programme and focus on the Future Rapid Effect System (FRES) in July 2003. In October 2003, the first Dutch prototype was delivered. In October 2006 the Netherlands confirmed the procurement of 200 Boxers to replace the M577 and the support variants of the YPR-765 in the Royal Netherlands Army. Deliveries were scheduled to run from 2013 through to 2018, and within the RNLA the baseline Boxer is called the Pantserwielvoertuig (PWV), “Armour[ed] Wheel[ed] Vehicle“.

On 13 December 2006 the German parliament approved the procurement of 272 Boxers for the German Army, to replace some of its M113 and TPz 1 Fuchs vehicles, although as of Q2 2024 no TPz 1 Fuchs have been replaced by delivered Boxer. Production of Boxers had been scheduled to commence in 2004, but production was delayed and the first production example was delivered to the German Army in September 2009. Over seven years, prototypes accrued over 90,000 km of reliability trials and over 90,000 km of durability trials. At this time there were three confirmed production facilities for Boxer, one in the Netherlands (Rheinmetall) and two in Germany (Krauss-Maffei Wegmann and Rheinmetall). The original German Boxer order covered 125 APC, 65 command vehicles, 72 ambulance, and 12 driver training vehicles.

=== 2010s ===
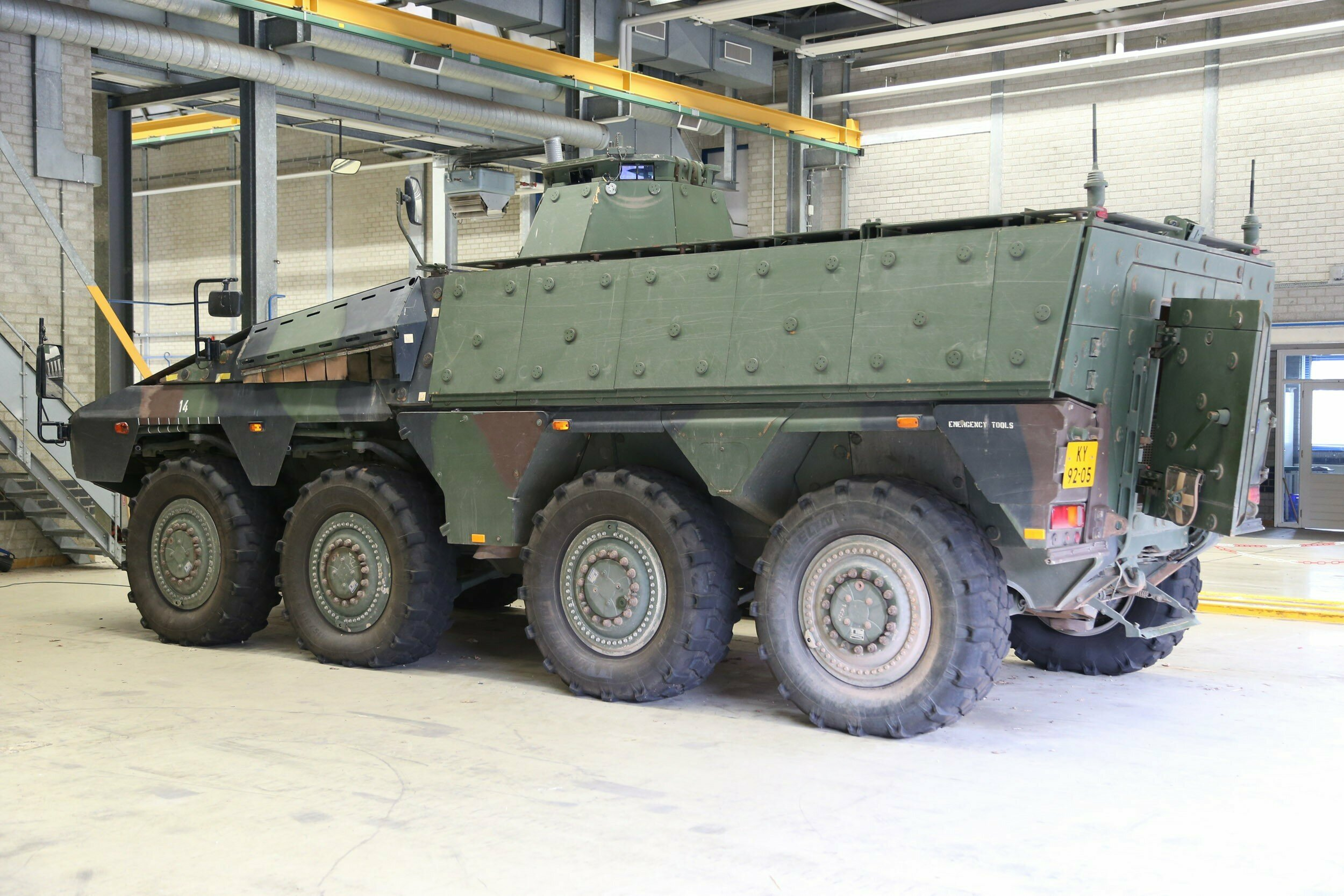
Boxer prototype in 2013.

In December 2015 it was announced that Germany had ordered an additional 131 Boxers worth EUR476 million and that Lithuania had selected the Boxer.

In August 2016 a EUR385.6 million production contract was placed by Lithuania for the supply of 88 Boxers, and at this time it was stated that 53 Boxers would be manufactured by KMW and the remaining 35 by Rheinmetall, with deliveries running 2017–2023. In Lithuanian service, the vehicle is designated as Vilkas (Wolf). The precise mix/number of Lithuanian vehicles was initially unclear but according to Janes, Lithuania would receive 91 Boxers in the A2 configuration, 89 as variants of the baseline IFV configuration, plus two driver-training vehicles. The exact breakdown being 55 squad-leader, 18 platoon-leader, 12 company-leader, and 4 command-post vehicles. A single IFV would be used for maintenance training. The first two vehicles (driver training configuration) were delivered in December 2017. The first two Boxer in IFV configuration were delivered in June 2019 and at this time the Lithuanian MoD stated that 15 vehicles would be delivered in 2019 and that all 89 IFV variants would be delivered by the end of 2023.

Most of the original German Army Boxer order was delivered in the A1 configuration. 40 APC and 16 command posts, however, were delivered in the A0 configuration; these were subsequently upgraded to the A1 configuration. In June 2017 it was announced that the Bundeswehr's Boxer A1 fleet would be upgraded to A2 standard. The first A2 Boxer was delivered in June 2015. The differences between A1 and A2 configurations are relatively minor electrical and mechanical engineering changes. The A2 standard resulted from operations in Afghanistan and incorporates changes in the drive and mission modules that include preparation for the integration of a driver vision system, changes to the stowage concept in both modules, changes to the gearbox, integration of a fire suppression system, modification of the RCWS, interface for an IED jammer, satellite communication system and other minor modifications." The latest Boxer variant is the A3. The British were the first customer of the A3 in its entirety.

In July 2017 ARTEC awarded the then Rheinmetall MAN Military Vehicles (RMMV) a €21 million contract to upgrade 38 Bundeswehr Boxer command vehicles to A2 configuration with work scheduled for completion in mid-2020. At this time the Bundeswehr also had 124 Boxer APCs, 72 ambulances and twelve driver training vehicles to upgrade to A2 status, with this work scheduled to conclude during 2024.

In February 2018 it was announced that Slovenia had selected the Boxer as the basis for two new mechanised infantry battle groups. In November it was revealed that pricing issues had impacted the Slovenian procurement timeline and that a new proposal from industry was pending. According to the Slovenian MoD's initial release on the subject, funding had been allocated for the procurement of 48 vehicles in 2018-2020 for the first battle group, which was expected to become operational by 2022, followed by the second in 2025. The desired total was reported to be 112 Boxer (96 IFV, 16 mortar) plus a small number of driver training vehicles. It was reported mid-2019 that the planned Boxer procurement had been suspended, the MoD deciding to conduct research and draw up a new comprehensive tactical study relating to the formation of a medium infantry battalion group, this likely to affect the procurement of 8×8 wheeled armoured vehicles. The ministry will then re-examine options available and make a decision on how to build a medium infantry battalion group capability.

In July 2016 it had been announced that the Boxer was one of two vehicle types (from four) down-selected to take part in the 12-month Risk Mitigation Activity for Australia's Land 400 Phase 2 project, and in March 2018 it was announced that Rheinmetall Defense Australia (RDA) had been selected as the preferred tenderer for that project which at the time called for 211 vehicles, with a roll-out of initial vehicles by 2021 and deliveries scheduled to be complete by 2026. In Australian Army service the Boxer is replacing an ageing fleet of 257 Australian Light Armoured Vehicles (ASLAV) that reached their life-of-type around 2021. Under Rheinmetall's offering, the first batch of 20 to 25 vehicles were to be built in Germany with Australians embedded into teams to learn the necessary skills before transferring back to Australia for the build of the remaining vehicles. RDA's Military Vehicle Centre of Excellence (MILVEHCOE) in Ipswich, Queensland, is the hub for the production of the majority of the vehicles, the local build programme including about 40 local suppliers. These industrial opportunities were stated to create up to 1,450 jobs across Australia, The acquisition and sustainment of the vehicles is costed at AUD15.7 billion (US$12.2 billion), acquisition worth AUD5.2 billion, the remaining AUD10.5 billion costed for sustainment over the vehicles' 30-year life. During Boxer's selection process, protection received a higher priority than lethality. Lethality was followed by mobility, then by sustainability and C4ISR considerations.

In March 2018 it was announced by the UK government that it was re-joining the Boxer programme, and in April 2018 it was announced that Boxer had been selected by the British Army to meet its Mechanised Infantry Vehicle (MIV) requirement. No details relating to quantity, cost, timeline or any contractual status were given. It was first reported in October 2016 that the British Ministry of Defence had taken its first formal step towards government-to-government acquisition of Boxers. At DSEI 2017, a Boxer in a Union Jack paint scheme was shown by Rheinmetall to promote the vehicle for the MIV requirement. In November 2017, a company of German Army mechanised infantry equipped with 11 Boxers exercised with British Army units in the Salisbury Plain Training Area. British Army sources denied that the exercise was linked to any decision on a procurement process for its MIV project. In February 2018 it was reported that ARTEC had signed agreements with UK suppliers, this contributing to the fact that 60% by value of the MIV contract will be done in Britain, along with final assembly of the MIVs at facilities already owned by the consortium.

In July 2018 there were three Boxer-related announcements made over a period of three days. On 17 July the Dutch MoD announced that the last Dutch Boxer had rolled off the production line, this being a cargo variant. On 18 July the Lithuanian MoD announced that the country's first two Boxer prototypes had entered trials in Germany. On 19 July 2018 the UK MoD disclosed its intent to order between 400 and 600 Boxers in four variants plus driver training vehicles, reference vehicles and support, with the first vehicles then to be in-service by 2023. The contract would contain options to increase the quantity of vehicles by up to an additional 900.

In March 2019 the Australian Ambassador to Germany inspected the first Boxer being delivered to the Australian Government under the Land 400 Phase 2 programme prior to its shipping to Australia, and in July 2019 the first two of the 25 Boxer being built in Germany arrived in Australia. The 25 vehicles delivered from Germany were split 12 reconnaissance platforms and 13 multi-purpose vehicles (MPVs). The 13 MPVs are classified as military off-the-shelf (MOTS), while the 12 reconnaissance are classified as MOTS Plus. Once in Australia, these vehicles received a number of Australia specific modifications prior to final delivery to the Army. The first vehicles were in use for training purposes by October 2020, with an Initial Operating Capability (IOC) declared in October 2022. Rheinmetall's contract calls for the delivery of 211 Boxers to the Australian Army, and in service Boxers will fill seven different roles on the battlefield: reconnaissance, command and control, joint fires, surveillance, multi-purpose, battlefield repair and recovery. The reconnaissance variant will account for 133 of the 211 vehicles and is equipped with Rheinmetall's Lance Medium Calibre Turret, previously known as the Lance Modular Turret System (MTS), which has a 30 mm automatic cannon.

Also in July 2019 the first two Boxer (Vilkas) IFVs ordered by Lithuania were officially handed over to the MoD. The MoD stated that 15 Vilkas would be delivered in 2019 and all 89 vehicles would be delivered by the end of 2023.

In September 2019 there were three Boxer-related announcements. On 10 September it was revealed that the target date for the UK's MIV programme to receive its main gate approval was 22 October 2019. It was reported that the business case for the purchase of an initial batch of 508 vehicles, valued at about GBP1.2 billion (US$1.48 billion), was currently under scrutiny by financial, commercial, and technical experts before receiving final approval by ministers. UK MoD officials submitted their final business case for the purchase of the Boxer MIVs on 9 September 2019 to meet the British Army's target of getting its first Boxer in service by 2023. At the 2019 Defence and Security Equipment International exhibition (DSEI 2019) in London, Germany's Flensburger Fahrzeugbau Gesellschaft (FFG) presented an armoured recovery mission module (ARM) for the Boxer Christoph Jehn, FFG's project manager, stated the ARM was developed as a private venture from 2017. The company noticed Boxer users struggling to recover stranded vehicles with the aid of other Boxers and so decided to develop the bespoke mission module for the purpose. The ARM has an approximate weight of 13 tonnes, is manned by two personnel and connects to the Boxer using standard mechanical interfaces. Other Boxer repair and recovery solutions are being developed. On 24 September 2019 it was announced that the first Boxer for the Australian Army had formally been handed over. The turretless vehicle was the first of 25 Boxers – 13 multipurpose and 12 reconnaissance variants – that were being manufactured in Germany through to 2021 to meet an early Australian capability requirement for familiarisation and training purposes. Production of the other 186 platforms began in late 2020/early 2021 at a Military Vehicle Centre of Excellence (MILVEHCOE) constructed by Rheinmetall at Ipswich, southwest of Brisbane, that formally opened in October 2020. This is the company's largest facility outside Germany. Also in September 2019 reports emerged that Algeria had selected the Boxer and that production would commence shortly. As of Q3 2024 this had not been confirmed by ARTEC.

In November 2019 the UK Ministry of Defence awarded ARTEC a GBP2.3 billion (US$2.97 billion) contract to deliver 523 Boxer in three main configurations, these encompassing nine sub-configurations.

=== 2020s ===
In January 2020 in an interview with Shaun Connors of Janes, Stefan Lischka, MD of ARTEC, stated that only 8% of UK Boxers (the original 523) would be manufactured in Germany with the remainder being assembled at and delivered from two sites in the UK, Rheinmetall BAE Systems Land (RBSL) at Telford and KMW subsidiary WFEL at Stockport. Production began in early 2023.

In November 2020 it was announced that ARTEC consortium partners Rheinmetall Landsysteme and Krauss-Maffei Wegmann (KMW) had awarded two separate subcontracts to Rheinmetall BAE Systems Land (RBSL) and WFEL respectively for the local production of Boxers for the UK. RBSL and WFEL were selected by Rheinmetall and KMW respectively to be the UK Tier 1 suppliers and operate one Boxer production line each. The value of KMW's initial contract has not been announced, but is known to involve at least 480 drive modules being produced by WFEL in the UK, with under half of them being assembled by WFEL into full vehicles covering the Infantry Carriers, Specialist Carriers and Ambulance variants. The remaining drive modules being produced by WFEL will be shipped to RBSL to construct the other full vehicles in a number of variants, including the Specialist Carrier. Rheinmetall's initial contract with RBSL is worth US$1.15 billion (GPB860 million) and involves the manufacture of 262 Boxer vehicles at RBSL's assembly line in Telford, UK. All of these vehicles will either be the Specialist Carrier or Command vehicles.

The German Federal Office of Bundeswehr Equipment, Information Technology and In-Service Support (Bundesamt für Ausrüstung, Informationstechnik und Nutzung der Bundeswehr, BAAINBw) awarded Rheinmetall a contract at the end of January 2021 to upgrade 27 more Boxer command vehicles to the A2 standard, this award bringing all the Bundeswehr's Boxer command vehicles up A2 standard.

In December 2019 Germany's BAAINBw ordered 10 Boxer in C-UAS (Counter UAS) configuration, these later designated Extended All Arms Air Defence (EAAAD). By June 2020 all elements of the system had reportedly passed the critical design review and live firing had been conducted. The first systems were to be delivered to the Bundeswehr by the close of 2020. Boxers with the C-UASs were stated to be used to protect the NATO Response Force Very High Readiness Joint Task Force (VJTF) which Germany took leadership of in 2023. In 2023 it was stated that deliveries of these C-UAS configured Boxer would occur 2023–2024.

In June 2020 the Bundeswehr repeated an earlier statement that it would replace the Wiesel weapon carrier with a Kampfboxer mission module bringing the combination of a 30 mm cannon and Spike-LR anti-tank guided missile to the wheeled platform. This requirement would develop to become the Schwerer Waffenträger Infanterie (sWaTrg Inf) HWC infantry vehicle.

In September 2021 OCCAR announced a new reconnaissance vehicle mission module for the Bundeswehr known as the Joint Fire Support Team schwer (Heavy) differentiating it from the smaller Fennek scout car. The new variant will be centred around a sensor mast known as the Panoramic Above Armour Gimbal (PAAG) and built by Thales Group, with imaging sensors for visible to thermal infrared spectra and rangefinding and targeting lasers. Two prototypes were ordered in 2021, with delivery expected during 2024–2026, with full production of 20 vehicles that will operate in pairs to follow in between 2028 and 2031.

On 8 April 2022 it was disclosed that British Army would receive an additional 100 Boxers, bringing the order total to 623. No variant breakdown or other details was provided at the time. In 2023 it was disclosed that inclusive of the additional 100 Boxer ordered in 2022, RBSL is now contracted to manufacture 272 Boxers in the Specialist Carrier Vehicle (SCV) and Command Post configurations, this total including 10 Boxer from the 100-Boxer award. RBSL will manufacture 234 Boxer, with 117 vehicles to be built in Germany. The German contingent includes the bulk of the 100 vehicles ordered in the second contract, which are being manufactured to ensure that the programme is able to meet the British Army's plans to achieve Initial Operational Capability (IOC) in 2025, and Full Operational Capability (FOC) in 2032. Details of UK Boxer breakdown and designations can be found in Operators.

In June 2022, a tracked Boxer concept was shown by Krauss-Maffei Wegmann (KMW) at the Eurosatory defence exhibition. The vehicle remains a concept and is covered in Other variants including prototypes, concepts and developmental platforms.

In April 2023 the Lithuanian Ministry of National Defence (MND) revealed it planned to purchase more than 120 additional Boxers, and that a contract could be signed as soon as Q4 2023. In July 2024 it was announced that Lithuania would in fact procure tracked IFVs to complement a planned new tank battalion, but some additional Boxers will still be acquired to serve as engineering vehicles, command posts, and reserve.

During the Future Armoured Vehicles Survivability (FAVS) conference held in November 2023, a representative from the German Army explained that the service intended to field four medium brigades. These brigades were planned to be equipped with new Boxer variants, including a Boxer variant referred to as Armoured Infantry Fighting Vehicle (AIFV). Like the Boxer Heavy Weapons Carrier, this AIFV variant was expected to be based on or around the Australian Boxer Combat Reconnaissance Vehicle (CRV). Rheinmetall and KNDS Deutschland are understood to have proposed different turret options, with the former understood to have offered its two-person Lance turret as fitted to the Combat Reconnaissance Vehicle (CRV) and Schwerer Waffenträger Infanterie (sWaTrg Inf) HWC infantry vehicle, with KNDS Deutschland proposing its Remote Controlled Turret 30 mm (RCT30).

By late 2023, ARTEC had five disclosed Boxer assembly lines in operation which have the capacity to produce 200 vehicles per year beginning in 2024. These facilities are located in Brisbane, Ede, Kassel, Munich and Telford.

Lithuania confirmed in January 2024 that at the end of 2023 it had completed the procurement of the original 91 Boxer. Also in January 2024 it was reported that the UK had plans to order some additional Boxer variants, although quantities were not revealed. With an Initial Operating Capability (IOC) of the end of the decade, the first priority is to order Armoured Vehicle Launched Bridge, Repair and Recovery, and Armoured Mortar Vehicle configurations in 2024. Serpens Deep Find radar, Mounted Close Combat Overwatch (MCCO) anti-tank vehicles, and a C-UAS capability could then follow.

In February 2024 the Bundeswehr ordered its first specialised versions of the Boxer with a batch of Skyranger 30 air-defence systems from Rheinmetall. Under a €595 million contract, Rheinmetall was to deliver a prototype at the end of 2024, followed by 18 production vehicles, with an option for 30 more. The Skyranger 30 will be a key component of the Bundeswehr's Nah- und Nächstbereichsschutz (short- and very-short-range air defence: NNbS), for which a Rheinmetall Electronics, Diehl Defence, and Hensoldt Sensors Arbeitsgemeinschaft (ARGE) working group was awarded a contract in January 2023. The turret will be equipped with a 30 × 173 mm KCE revolver gun firing programmable ABM, two Stinger surface-to-air missiles, and a sensor suite. The latter will comprise a Hensoldt Spexer X-band radar with three panels each providing 120° azimuth coverage integrated into the turret and an electro-optical tracking sensor with a thermal camera, day camera, and laser rangefinder for target identification and tracking. The turret will also be equipped with Rheinmetall's Rapid Obscuring System (ROSY) smoke grenade launchers. As of Q3 2024, series production was scheduled to commence in April 2026, and was expected to be completed in March 2028.

On 10 April 2024 Rheinmetall Defence Australia and the Australian government signed a production agreement for 103 Schwerer Waffenträger Infanterie (sWaTrg Inf) HWC infantry vehicles. The deal is valued at €1.95 billion, and includes a €746.9 million service and maintenance contract. Germany's parliament approved the deal on 20 March, and the order was placed by the Bundeswehr on 21 March. The sWaTrg Inf is based on the Australian Combat Reconnaissance Vehicle (CRV), this fitted with Rheinmetall's Lance turret. For the sWaTrg Inf the turret will additionally be armed with the Mehrrollenfähiges leichtes Lenkflugkörper-System (Multirole-capable Light Missile System: MELLS), this the Bundeswehr's designation for the Spike LR.

The Bundeswehr will acquire up to 123 Schwerer Waffenträger Infanterie (sWaTrg Inf) HWC infantry vehicles in total between 2025 and 2028. The first 20 units are scheduled for delivery during 2025, and these will be manufactured in Germany at Rheinmetall's Unterluess and Kassel plants. The following 103 units will be exported from Australia, having been manufactured at Rheinmetall's Military Vehicle Centre of Excellence (MILVEHCOE) in Queensland between 2026 and 2030. The sWaTrg Inf will replace the Wiesel 1 tracked tactical direct fire-support weapon carrier in Bundeswehr service, and will equip the Army's new medium forces. As of Q2 2024, the sWaTrg Inf vehicle is expected to begin fielding in 2027.

On 24 April 2024, the UK announced its selection of the Boxer-based Remote-Controlled Howitzer 155mm (RCH 155) for the British Army's Mobile Fires Platform programme, as a successor for the AS90. The vehicles will be built in both Germany and the UK with over 100 UK-based suppliers manufacturing components. The platform will be in service with the Royal Artillery by the end of the decade.

While not confirmed, it was reported in May 2024 that the Bundeswehr had selected the RCT30 turret option for the 148 Boxer it had identified it required for its new medium forces. The choice is understood to have been role-driven, the RCT30 turret permitting the transport of a fully equipped grenadier squads, while the Lance turret-equipped sWaTrgInf Heavy Weapons Carrier does not, this vehicle optimised for direct tactical fire in support of infantry forces, not as a transport for them. The project was scheduled for German parliamentary approval during Q4 2024, with sources suggesting at the time that the Netherlands could also order a batch of RCT30-fitted Boxer. The Lance and RCT30 turrets are both fitted with Rheinmetall's 30 mm cannon. The RCT30 turret is essentially that fitted to the PSM Puma IFV.

In September 2024 it was confirmed that the Dutch would acquire the RCT30 Boxer. The Dutch 13th Light Brigade announced on September 17 that its two infantry battalions would be reinforced with Boxer RCT30 infantry fighting vehicles (IFVs). No contract, acquisition timeline details or similar were given. Also in September 2024, Rheinmetall in partnership with Patria presented a Boxer with a NEMO 120 mm mortar turret. The concept demonstrator was built in response to the Armoured Mortar requirement from the British Army and was shown using an existing British Army drive module.

In October 2024 it was announced by OCCAR that the Lithuanian Army would receive 27 additional Boxer. Few details beyond a statement that the agreement included a new engineering variant of Boxer directly integrating engineering equipment (such as that used for mine clearance) into the existing Lithuanian Infantry Fighting Vehicle configuration were released at the time.

In January 2025 at International Armoured Vehicles 2025 (IAV2025) the first British-manufactured Boxer was unveiled. The vehicle was manufactured by RBSL, the joint venture between Rheinmetall and BAE Systems, and under licence from the ARTEC consortium of KNDS and Rheinmetall. At the time of the unveiling RBSL had manufactured four Boxers, with another four then undergoing factory acceptance tests. An additional 48 platforms are scheduled to be manufactured over the course of 2025 in command post, special carrier, ambulance and infantry carrier variants. At IAV 2025 it was also revealed that an order for 222 Boxer RCT30 had been delayed to Q2 or Q3 2025 by the German national elections, these scheduled for 23 February. Of the 222, 150 are for Germany's new medium forces, and 72 are for the Netherlands. Also in January 2025, the first of 54 RCH 155 wheeled howitzers was handed over to the Ukraine by KNDS. January also saw the confirmation of the delivery of nine Boxer RCT30 IFVs to Ukraine, these designated AiTO30 FDC and equipped with systems specifically designed for counter-drone operations to protect artillery units from aerial threats.

In February 2025 Rheinmetall announced the delivery in late-January of the first Boxer Skyranger 30 air defence vehicle (the verification model) to the Bundeswehr. Trials commencing in spring 2025 are scheduled to be followed by serial deliveries during 2027–2028.

In April 2026 KNDS opened a new Boxer drive-module line at Munich/Allach and signed an MoU with the DRÄXLMAIER Group for mission-module production at Landau an der Isar, aiming to roughly sextuple annual output by 2030 against a backlog exceeding 2,000 vehicles.

== Design ==
The Boxer is an eight-wheeled multirole vehicle that at the time of its development easily exceeded most comparable vehicles in weight and dimensions. In recent years the size/weight differences between Boxer and its contemporaries has reduced considerably, with Boxer quoted to have a combat weight of 36.5 tonnes in 2016 in A1 and A2 configurations, while vehicles such as ST Kinetics' Terrex 3 had a quoted combat weight of 35 tonnes, and Nexter's VBCI, Patria's AMV and General Dynamics' Piranha V all weighing in around the 32 to 33 tonne mark. Current combat weight of the Boxer in A3 configuration is quoted as up to 38.5 tonnes. However, ARTEC conducted trials in December 2021 with a Boxer weighing 41 tonnes. The vehicle, which was ballasted and without a mission module, traversed gaps up to 2.2 m, climbed a 60° slope, and surmounted a 1 m vertical step during trials. ARTEC managing director Stefan Lischka stated that there was no actual customer requirement for such a heavy Boxer at this time. The heaviest current version is the remote-controlled howitzer (RCH) version at 39 tonnes.

The Boxer consists of two key elements: the platform/drive-line (the drive module) and the removable mission module.

=== Drive module ===
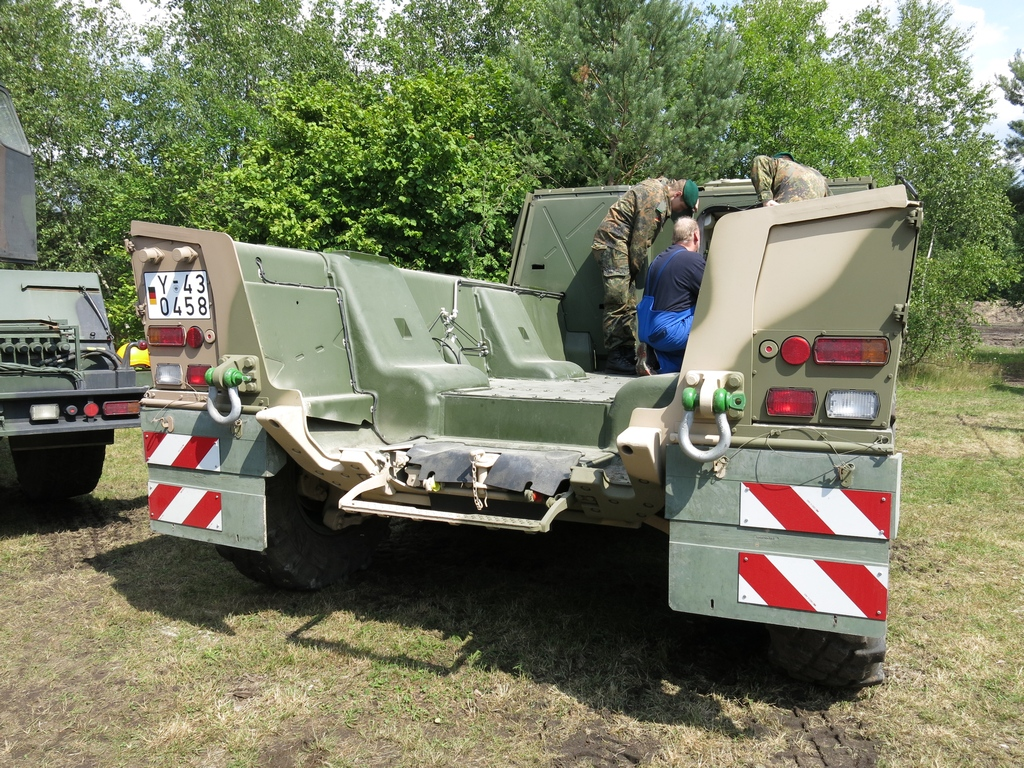
Boxer drive module, view from behind, mission module dismounted

The drive module is also known as the platform or the drive-line module. It consists of the hull mounting the drive axles, and is enclosed over the frontal arc where the powerpack and driver is located. The A (Alteration) iterations applied to the Boxer are specific to the drive module. The drive module locates the driver front right (right-hand drive), with the powerpack to the left. The powerpack can be replaced under field conditions in about 30 minutes and can, if required, be run outside of the vehicle for test purposes.

There are currently three main lines of drive modules: the A, the B0 and C0 models. The initial production model was A0 with fewer than 60 delivered. It was followed by the A1 and subsequently by the A2 model in 2015. Current production standard depending on user is either A2 or A3. Australia is receiving an A2/A3 hybrid, in that it will receive the latest A3 drive module (rated at 38,500 kg) but with the A2 standard engine rating of 530 kW (711 hp).

In 2024, the states participating in OCCAR's Boxer program defined the B0 drive module as Future Common Drive Module, offering advantages such as easier scalability of production, reducing the training required by the users and maintainers, improving interoperability and flexibility while also reducing parts and lead times. The B0 module is based on the A3 model and has a gross vehicle mass of 40 tonnes (39 long tons; 44 short tons), new tires and a modified chassis. The hull has been altered so that mission modules rest on six instead of four connection points. The German IFV variant of the Boxer will be based on the B0 drive module.

Due to the deeper modifications in the design, the drive module developed for the Australian Boxer CRV Block 2 is considered the C0 module. The Boxer sWaTrg Inf variant manufactured in Australia for the German Army is also based on the C0 module. The Skyranger 30 variant was to be based on the C0 drive module, but due to delays it will be based on the newer B0 drive module instead.

==== Specifications ====
	Wheeled A0	Wheeled A1	Wheeled A2	Wheeled A2/A3 hybrid	Wheeled A3	Wheeled B0	Tracked Mk.1
	Dimensions						
Length (hull)	7.93 m (26.0 ft)						7.56 m (24.8 ft)
Height (hull)	2.38 m (7.8 ft)						n/avail
Width	2.99 m (9.8 ft)						3.45 m (11.3 ft)
	Weights						
Chassis	24.0 t (52,900 lb)	25.2 t (56,000 lb)					28.0 t
GVW (limit capacity)	35.0 t (77,200 lb)	36.5 t (80,000 lb)		38.5 t (85,000 lb) (tactical variants); 41.0 t (90,400 lb) (technical limit)		40.0 t (88,200 lb) (tactical variants)	45.0 t
	Performance						
Max. speed	103 km/h (64 mph) on road						70 km/h (43 mph)
Range	maximum: 1,050 km (650 mi); average: 650 km (400 mi)						500 km (310 mi)
Ride height	0.50 m (1.6 ft)						0.45 m (1.5 ft)
Gradient	60% (31.0°)						60% (31.0°)
Side slope	30% (16.7°)						30% (16.7°)
Vertical step	0.8 m (2.6 ft)						0.8 m (2.6 ft)
Trench	2.0 m (6.6 ft)						2.5 m (8.2 ft)
Turning radius	10.5 m (34 ft) with two steering axles (1st & 2nd); or 7.5 m (25 ft) with skid steer						—
	Powertrain						
Engine	MTU 8V199 TE20				MTU 8V199 TE21		MTU 881 Ka-501 CR
Engine power	720 PS (530 kW)				820 PS (600 kW)		up to 1,200 PS (880 kW)
Engine torque	2,699 N⋅m (1,991 lb⋅ft)				2,999 N⋅m (2,212 lb⋅ft)		—
Power-to-weight ratio at GVW	20.6 PS/t (15.2 kW/t)	19.7 PS/t (14.5 kW/t)		18.7 PS/t (13.8 kW/t)	21.3 PS/t (15.7 kW/t)	20.5 PS/t (15.1 kW/t)	26.7 PS/t (19.6 kW/t)
Transmission	Allison model HD4800SP fully automatic transmission with seven forward and three reverse gears transmitting drive via a RRW3001 angular gearbox, with integrated torque converter and cooling system within the powerpack						Renk HSWL 256 fully automatic with six forward and six reverse gears
Axles	ZF with longitudinal and cross-axle differential locks to give full eight-wheel lock-up if required						tracked
Suspension	double-wishbone with coil springs and shock-absorbers						n/avail
	Protection level						
Frontal armour	rolled all-welded steel armour STANAG 4569 level 6 (30 mm AP and APFSDS) typical all around protection 14.5 mm level 4 (14.5 mm armoured piercing)						
Mission module	rolled all-welded steel armour + AMAP-L + (AMAP-B on option) depends on the mission module, from STANAG 4569 level 2 (7.62 mm) to level 6 (30 mm armoured piercing) typical all around protection 14.5 mm level 4 (14.5 mm armoured piercing)						
Floor protection	triple-layered floor with AMAP-IED and AMAP-M						—

=== Mission module ===
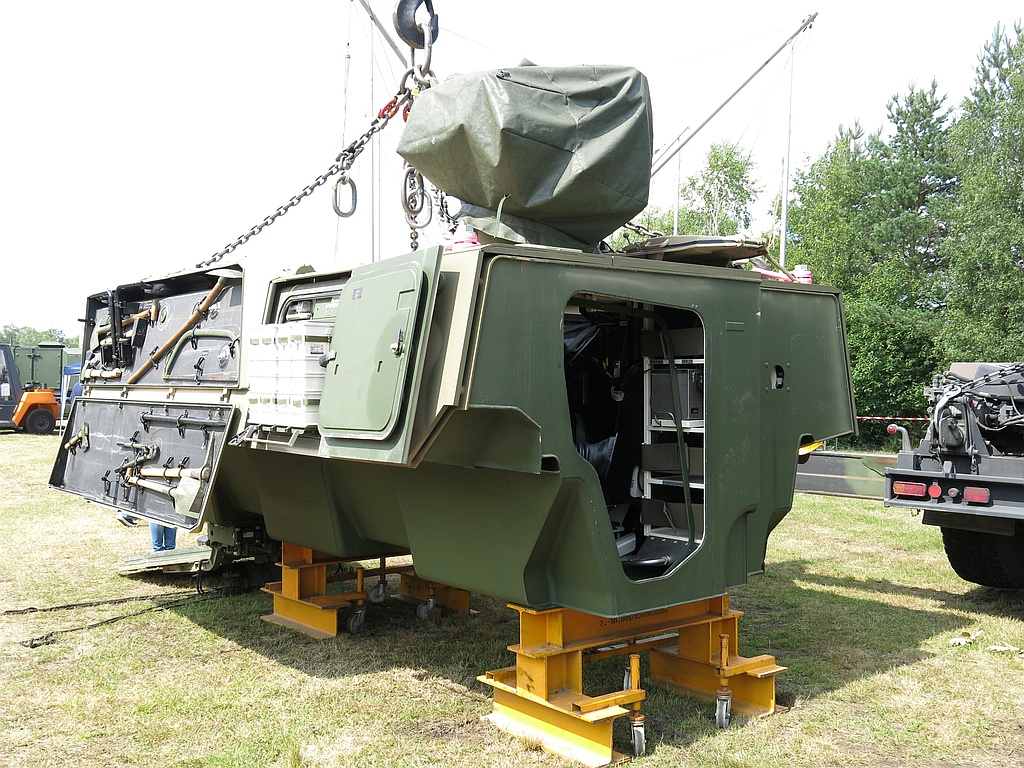
Boxer mission module, three-quarter view, dismounted

The mission module contains the mission-specific elements, such as weapons, equipment or crew. It is a key (and unique) feature of the Boxer. Mission modules are interchangeable pod-like units that are fitted to drive modules to form a complete mission variant vehicle. Mission modules are attached by four points and can be swapped within an hour under field conditions. The driver can access their compartment through the mission module or in an emergency via the large single-piece power-operated hatch above this position.

Internal protected volume of the baseline mission module is 14m³, this increasing to 17.5 m^{3} for higher roof configurations such as an ambulance configuration. While variable depending on protection levels and equipment fit/configuration, payload is stated to be 13.5 tonnes.

=== Armament ===
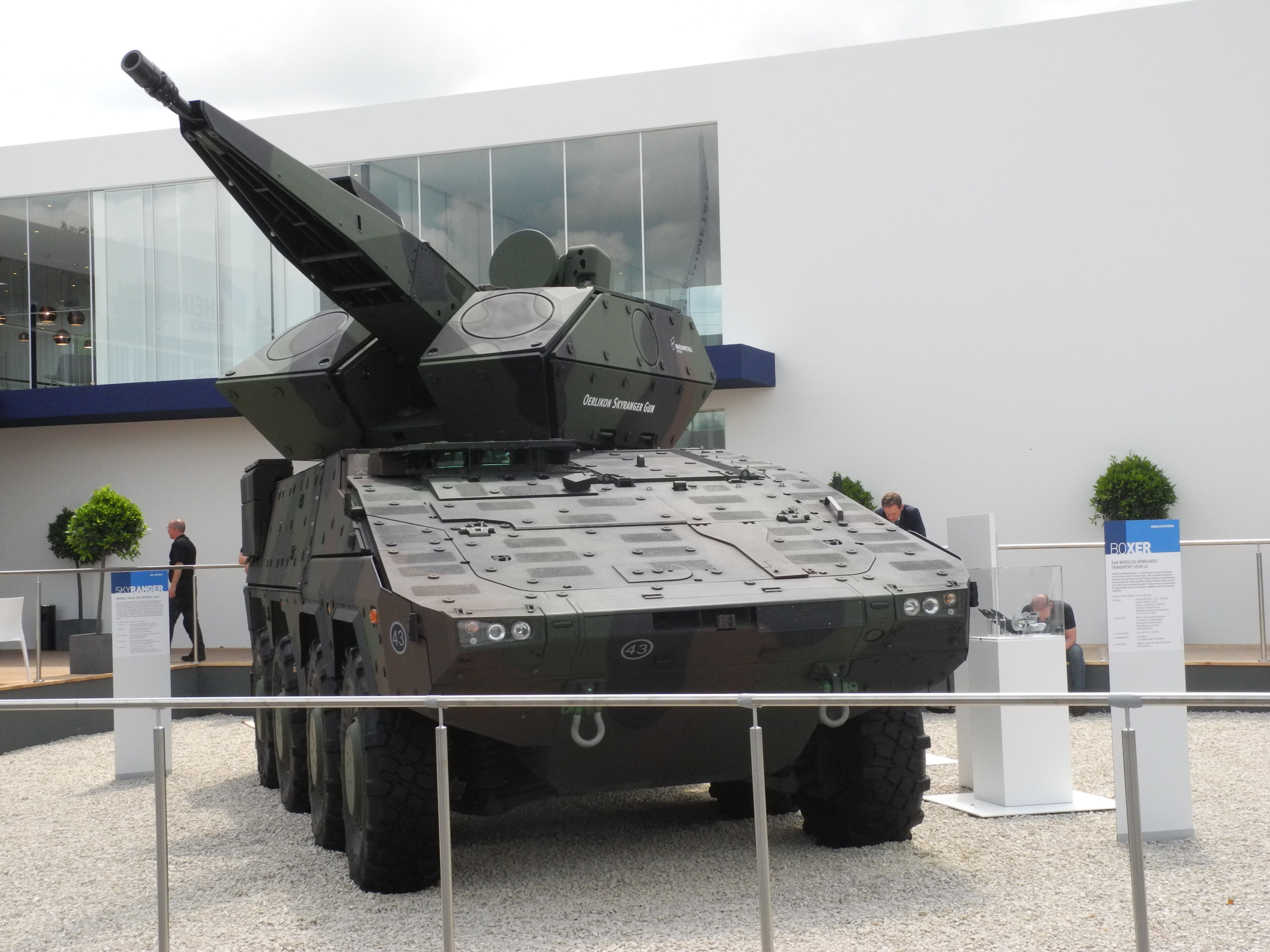
At Eurosatory 2018 Rheinmetall displayed a Boxer fitted with the Oerlikon Skyranger air defence system.

In service Boxers are fitted with a variety of armament ranging from a 7.62 mm light machine gun in a remote weapon station to a 30 mm cannon in a turret. Numerous other armament options are offered and these include missiles, mortars, a 105 mm main gun, and a 155 mm howitzer.

Most in-service Boxers are equipped with a remote weapon station for self-defense. Dutch vehicles are fitted with the Protector M151 RWS from Kongsberg fitted with a 12.7 mm heavy machine gun. German vehicles are usually fitted with the FLW-200 from KMW, which can be fitted with either a 7.62 mm MG3 machine gun, a 12.7 mm M3M HMG or a 40 mm GMW automatic grenade launcher. The FLW-200 has dual-axis stabilization and incorporates a laser rangefinder and a thermal imager. The Bundeswehr's Joint Fire Support Team, schwer (heavy), programme Boxers will be fitted with Kongsberg's Protector RS4 RWS, as will the C-UAS Boxer's if delivery occurs. British vehicles will also be fitted with Kongsberg's Protector RS4 RWS, the £180 million contract award announced in February 2021.

Lithuanian Boxers are fitted with the Israeli-made RAFAEL Advanced Defense Systems Samson Mk II RCT turret, mounting a fully stabilised Orbital ATK Mk 44 30 mm dual-feed cannon, 7.62 mm co-axial MG, and Spike-LR missiles. The turret is fitted with an independent commander's sight with both commander and gunner provided with thermal and daylight channels.

Australian Boxers are fitted with either Rheinmetall Defense's Lance Medium Calibre Turret or an EOS Defence Systems R400S-Mk2 D-HD RWS. 133 Combat Reconnaissance Vehicle (CRV) Reconnaissance variants will be fitted with the Lance 30 mm two-man turret, this armed with the Rheinmetall Mauser MK 30-2/ABM (air-bursting munition) dual-feed stabilised cannon and 7.62 mm coaxial machine gun. Turret traverse is all electric through a full 360° with weapon elevation from -15° to +45°. A Rheinmetall computerised fire-control system is installed, which allows stationary and moving targets to be engaged. The gunner has a Rheinmetall Stabilised Electro-Optical Sighting System (SEOSS), which typically has day/thermal channels and an eye-safe laser rangefinder. The commander has a Rheinmetall SEOSS panoramic sighting system, which allows hunter/killer target engagements to take place. The 121 Block II CRV Reconnaissance manufactured in Australia will be equipped with 2 turret-mounted Spike LR2 missiles and the Iron Fist APS (Active Protection System) from Elbit. It is intended that the original 12 Block I vehicles will be upgraded to Block II standard. Weapons' fit for the 82 R400S-Mk2 D-HD RWS ordered has yet to disclosed.

Germany will also receive Boxer fitted with the Skyranger 30 air defence system turret mission module. The Skyranger 30 turret is fitted with a modified version of the Oerlikon KCA 30 mm cannon. Rate of fire of is 1,200 rounds per minute and the gun has the ability to elevate 85° to combat terminal diving targets. 252 ready rounds are carried. The gun fires a 30 mm airburst munition based on the 35 mm AHEAD ammunition carrying 160 tungsten cylinders, each weighing 1.25 grams for a total payload of 200 grams, which is time-programmed upon leaving the muzzle to open up in front of a target to form a lethal cone. The system is capable of integrating a selection of very short range missiles, and for Germany these were supposed to FIM-92 Stingers, however due to its high costs and the planned Stinger version not being available yet for integration, Germany plans to instead adopt the MBDA Small Anti-Drone Missile in a 9 or 12 missile launcher instead.

=== Protection ===
The Boxer is constructed from rolled all-welded steel armour to which AMAP-B appliqué armour modules made by IBD Deisenroth (now Rheinmetall Protection Systems GmbH) are fitted via shock absorbing mountings. The armour has the form of spaced armour at the upper hull front and rectangular plates of metallic armour or ceramic armour at the sides.

Exact details of Boxer protection levels are classified. According to ARTEC, the vehicle will withstand anti-personnel and large anti-tank mines of an undisclosed type under the wheel, platform or side attack. It has previously been stated that Boxer's baseline armour is all-round resistant to 14.5 mm armour-piercing ammunition in accordance with STANAG 4569 Level 4. The advantageous shape of the frontal armour results in protection against medium calibre weapons. The vehicle is protected against the blast and fragments of artillery rounds and improvised explosive devices. Its hull is constructed with a triple-layered floor incorporating composite materials and forming a v-over-v hull providing protection against anti-tank mines. Additional armour plates can be installed under the vehicles to further improve mine protection.

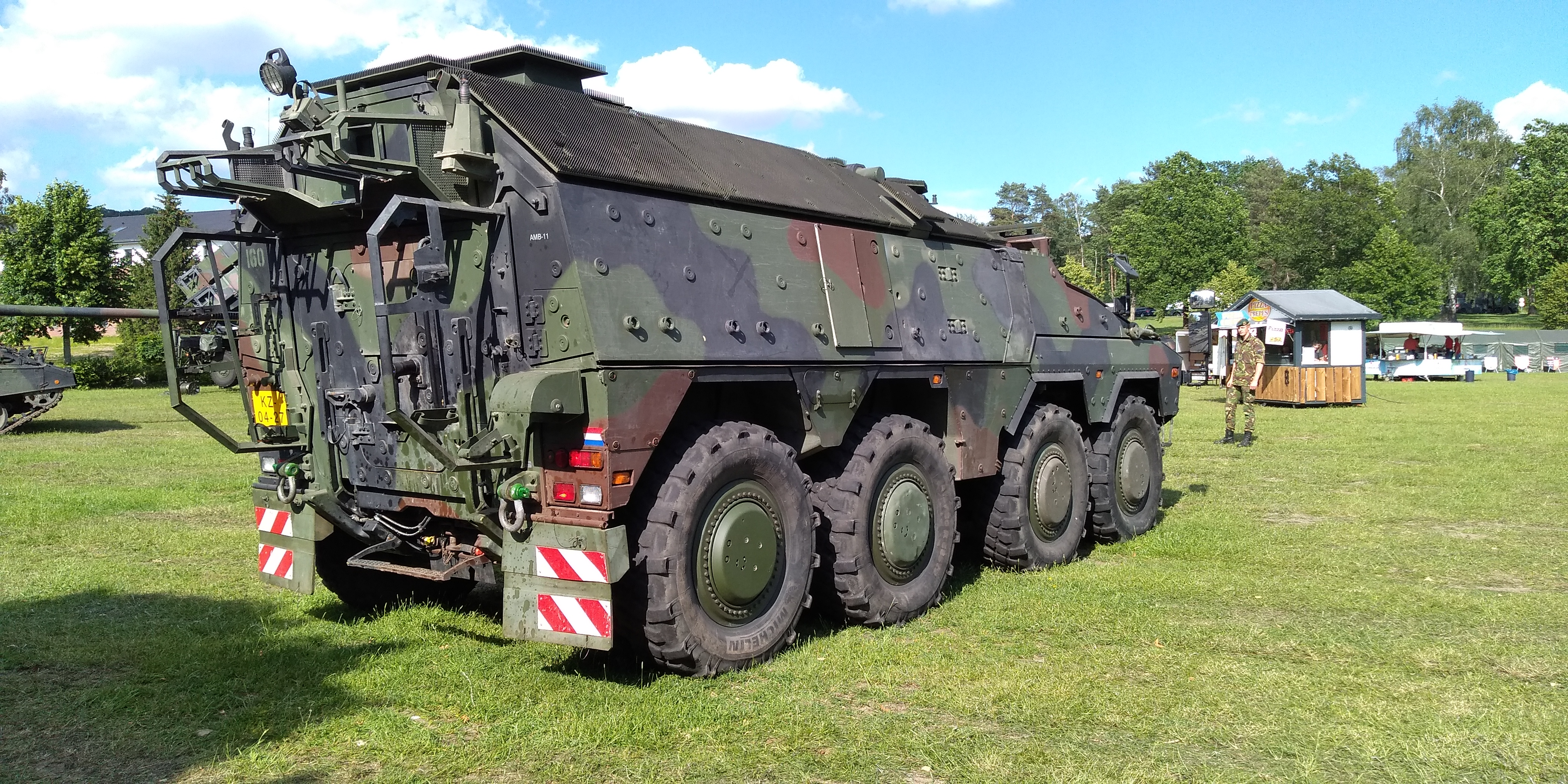
Dutch Boxer fitted with optional anti-bomblet roof armour

A newer, weight-optimized armour kit was developed by IBD Deisenroth for the Dutch A2 model, offering the same level of protection as the original one at a 500 kilograms (1,100 lb) lower weight. German Boxers retained their original armour kit.

To increase survivability in case of armour penetration, the crew compartment is completely covered by an AMAP-L spall liner. The spall liner stops most of the fragments of the armour and projectile brought about by hull penetration. To further enhance crew protection, the seats are decoupled from the floor, this preventing the shock of a mine-detonation being directly transmitted to the crew. The roof armour of the Boxer is designed to withstand artillery fragments and can be fitted with optional armor modules against top attack weapons such as bomblets fitted with a High-Explosive Anti-Tank (HEAT) warhead.

The Boxer drive module A1 (as designated by the German BWB) is an upgraded version of the baseline A0 version of the Boxer drive module, with the primary difference being the installation of mine protection plates fitted to the belly and wheel stations of the vehicle. The additional armour package is focused on protecting against side and underbody IEDs threats, in particular EFP-IEDs and the shrapnel of IEDs consisting of stacks of artillery rounds. This consists of the AMAP-M and AMAP-IED packages. An unspecified electronic countermeasure (ECM) system was also fitted to counter IEDs. These changes result in a 1,058 kg weight increase for the A1 over the baseline A0 APC variant. For the A2 and A3 Boxer protection is reported to have been increased further.

=== Mobility and transport ===
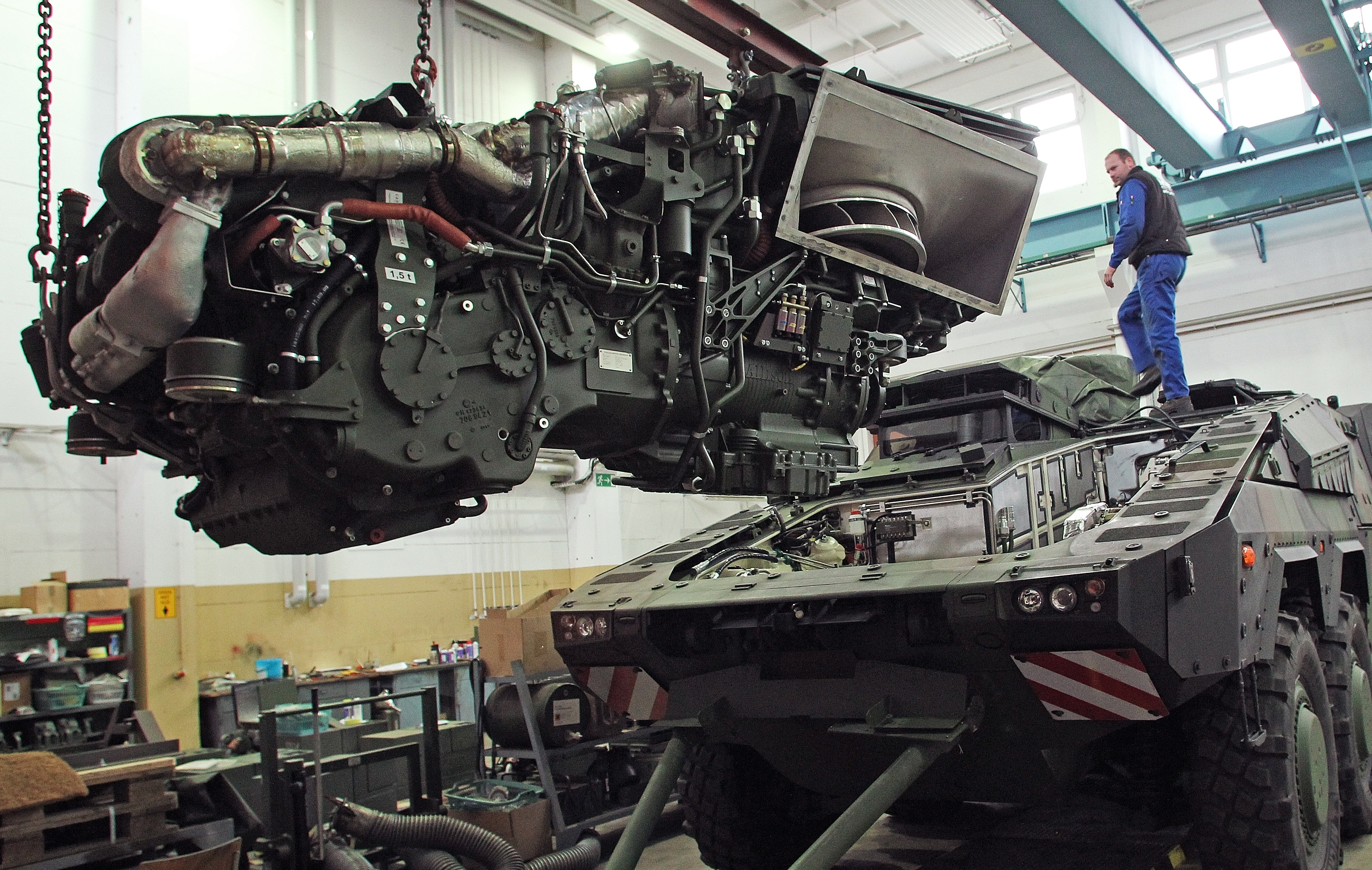
Boxer's powerpack consists of a MTU diesel coupled to an Allison transmission

The powerpack of the Boxer consists of a MTU 8V199 TE20 water-cooled diesel engine developing (originally) 720 hp and coupled to an Allison HD4070 fully automatic transmission with seven forward and three reverse gears. The powerpack can be replaced under field conditions in approximately 30 minutes. The MTU 8V199 TE20 engine is a militarised development of the Mercedes-Benz OM 500 truck engine, modified by MTU to produce increased power via changes to the turbocharger, fuel injection and cooling systems. To maintain mobility levels at increased weights, the 8V199 TE20 is now available developing either 530 kW (711 hp) or 600 kW (805 hp), and when the drive module is fitted with the 600 kW version of this engine it is designated A3. The Boxer is fitted with three fuel tanks containing a total of 562 litres, divided between a 280-litre front tank, 238-litre rear tank, and a 44-litre reserve tank.

Boxer has full-time 8×8 drive with differential locks on all axles and the front four wheels steer. Tyres are 415/80R 27 Michelin XML on German and Dutch Boxers. The Land 400 prototypes were fitted with 415/80R 685 Michelin XForce 2 tyres, these having a 500 kg per wheel greater load rating than the XML and being more 'all-terrain' in design than the rocks/mud-optimised XML. Standard tyre fit for Australian and UK Boxers will be 415/80R 685 Michelin XForce ZL rated to carry 5,600 kg each.

A central tire inflation system (CTIS) is fitted, and run-flat inserts allow for 30 km travel at up to 50 km/h in the event of a puncture. Braking is provided by Knott pneumatic ABS on all wheels with main braking power actuated on the front two axles. Suspension is fully independent double wishbone with coil springs.

The Boxer can be transported in the Airbus A400M tactical airlifter, albeit not in one piece. With a capacity of around 32-tonnes, the loading ramp of an A400M cannot accommodate a complete Boxer so the drive and mission modules need to be separated for transport. Two Boxers can be transported by three A400Ms, two for the drive modules and a third for the mission modules.

== Boxer variants and mission modules overview ==
As of April 2022 ARTEC had outlined 23 mission module configurations for the Boxer, and suggested that two more would soon be introduced. Of the 23, 10 were stated to be delivered or being delivered, five contracted, and the remaining eight at prototype/concept stage. By 2023 ARTEC had outlined 31 mission module configurations for Boxer. Any modules developed independently of ARTEC are not included in the 31 figure, these including RBSL and other developments.

ARTEC can in some instances define the same mission module function as separate mission module types/configurations, one example of several such instances being Ambulance modules which are currently designated Ambulance A, Ambulance B, and Ambulance C. These account for three of the 31 outlined module configurations, but as ARTEC generally does not identify which mission module configuration from official literature have been supplied to any specific user for any specific role, which of the three designated Ambulance mission module configurations is used by the three individual known users is unclear. Users will also designate their specific modules as per individual naming protocols, and not retain ARTEC designations. An example here, the UK order includes a batch of C2-Utility (C2U) Vehicle configuration, but no source confirms the ARTEC mission module designation/configuration for these.

Module nomenclature has also changed over time, and there is a limited degree of inconsistency in the reporting of which user has which exact module.

At the Defence iQ International Armoured Vehicles 2020 conference, Stefan Lishka, MD of ARTEC commented that the term configuration had superseded variant for Boxers, and Boxer mission modules. The reason for this was that some current/planned variants (build configurations) are/would be interchangeable by crew members.

The following bullet point list of mission modules is based on current ARTEC literature, with the more detailed following sub-sections (in no specific order) detailing mission module and overall Boxer configuration user information by the varying designation methods available. Where any information is unclear, this fact is noted. The running order of the list is as per ARTEC literature, hence the occasional apparent listing anomaly.

- Ambulance A
- Ambulance B
- Ambulance C
- Engineer vehicle
- APC 1
- APC 2
- APC 3
- Cargo
- Command post A
- Command post B
- Command post C
- Command post D
- Repair
- Recovery
- Driver training vehicle
- IFV Samson
- Recovery and repair
- Bridge system 14 m
- Joint fire support A
- IFV Lance
- Skyranger 30
- Bridge system 22 m
- Joint fire support B
- Surveillance
- IFV RCT30
- Mortar 120 mm
- Mortar 120 mm NEMO
- Reconnaissance
- Short range air defense
- Remote control howitzer 155
- Main gun 105 mm

=== Armoured Personnel Carrier ===
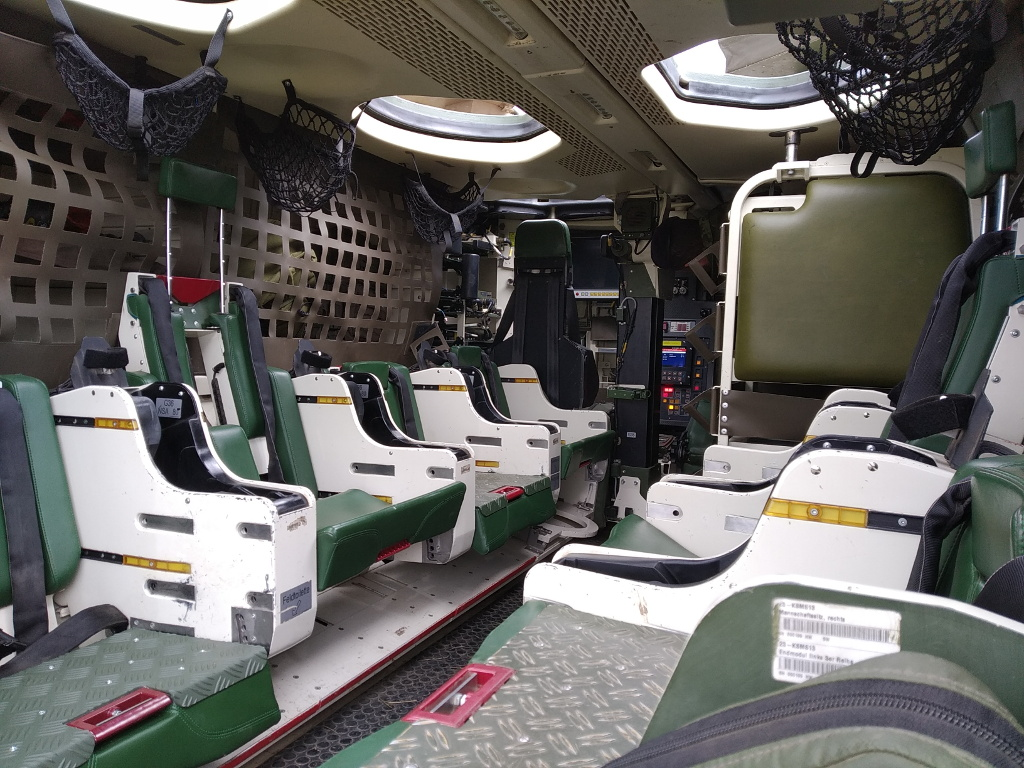
Boxer mission module interior

The armoured personnel carrier (APC) variant can be considered a baseline configuration for Boxer. The German Army received 125 APC modules as part of the initial 272-vehicle order. All 131 vehicles from the second German Army order are in a new configuration of the armoured personnel carrier (Gepanzertes Transportfahrzeug).

=== Command Post ===
The command post variants of the Boxer are used for command and control in theatre, acting as a centre for tactical communications. Secured communication, displays for situational awareness and instruments for network-enabled warfare are key characteristics of this variant. There are currently four designated Command Post configurations, A, B, C and D. In standard configuration the command post module offers room for four workstations and the vehicle crew consists of driver, commander/weapon operator, two staff officers, one staff assistant and one additional crew member.

The German Army received 65 command post modules as part of the initial 272-vehicle order; the Dutch Army ordered 60 command post modules originally, but later reduced this to 36 modules. Australia and the UK will also receive command post variants of the Boxer. Lithuania's command post variants will be based around the IFV.

The UK requirement calls for a total of 212 mission modules in five configurations for command, control, communications, computers, and intelligence (C4I) applications.

As part of Land 400 Phase 2 deliveries, Australia will receive 15 CRV-C2 (Combat Reconnaissance Vehicle - C2) as part of Block II deliveries. These have a crew of seven. Will be fitted with a R400S-MK2-D-HD RWS remote weapon station mounting an unspecified weapon. Four of the additional 12 mission modules ordered will be in CVR-C2 configuration.

=== Ambulance ===
==== First generation of ambulances ====
The German Army received 72 ambulance modules as part of the initial 272-vehicle order; the Dutch Army ordered 52 ambulance modules. The German and Dutch Boxer ambulance variant utilise a mission module with a raised roofline providing an internal height of 1.85 m and volume of 17.5 m^{3}. In Dutch service the Boxer ambulance replaced the YPR-765 prgwt variant of the AIFV (Armored Infantry Fighting Vehicle) casualty transport and it can accommodate seven casualties that are seated or three lying down on stretchers, or one of the following combinations: three seated and two lying down, or four seated and a single casualty lying down. The crew consists of driver, commander and, in Dutch version a nurse; in the German version a doctor or 'Rettungshelfer' (rescue assistant). The Dutch vehicle, a medical evacuation vehicle, differs from the German medical treatment vehicle. The UK has ordered ambulance modules, and Australia has an option for 11 of these.

In November 2025, the German Army signed a contract of €117 million to modernise the 72 ambulances. It includes:

- new medical equipment
- D-LBO, modernisation of the radio system.

==== Second generation of ambulances ====
The German Army ordered 38 ambulances to KNDS Deutschland in November 2025.

=== Geniegroep / CRV-MPV (Combat Reconnaissance Vehicle - Multi-Purpose Vehicle) ===
The Boxer Geniegroep (GNPR) was originally a Dutch-specific engineering and logistics support vehicle that is deployed for the transport of troops and engineer group equipment. It provides seating for six dismounts with space available for their personal equipment and an additional separate stowage section for munitions. It may be deployed as a support vehicle with other units or used for independent assignments such as route clearance, or as a protected work location during mine clearance or demolition operations. The Boxer GNGP replaces the YPR-765 prgm/PRCO-C3 variant of the AIFV (Armoured Infantry Fighting Vehicle). The Royal Netherlands Army initially ordered 53 GNPR, this later revised to 92, and has subsequently converted 12 of the 92 GNGP vehicles ordered to Boxer Battle Damage Repair (BDR) configuration. The BDR variant is able to accommodate the special equipment, tools, expendable and non-expendable supplies needed to carry out diagnoses, maintenance and minor repairs if required. Crew consists of an engineer commander, driver, observing commander, gunner, and five engineers.

As part of Land 400 Phase 2 deliveries, Australia received 13 CRV-MPV (Combat Reconnaissance Vehicle - Multi-Purpose Vehicle) as part of Block 1 deliveries. These are based on the GNGP Engineer Vehicle of the Netherlands Army, and were manufactured in Germany. Will be fitted with a R400S-MK2-D-HD RWS remote weapon station mounting an unspecified weapon

=== Cargo ===
The Boxer Cargo is a Dutch-specific variant that replaced the YPR-765 prv variant of the AIFV (Armored Infantry Fighting Vehicle). It is equipped with a special loading floor to secure cargo during transport and can transport a maximum of two standard one tonne army pallets (max. load 2,5 t). The interior design of the vehicle allows adaptation as necessary for different kinds of missions. For conducting peace-keeping missions or other peacetime operations the set of vehicle equipment can be changed and tailored to suit as required. Crew consists of commander/gunner and driver. 27 cargo examples were originally ordered, this later revised to 12. A cargo variant was the final Dutch Boxer produced.

=== Driver Training Vehicle ===
This driver training vehicle (DTV) variant is equipped with a training module. The driver sits in the conventional driver's station and the instructor is seated in an elevated position in the driver training cabin. Active occupant protection is designed to protect the crew sitting exposed in the driver training cabin. In the event of a roll-over accident, the instructor and upper occupant seats are electronically retracted into the Driver Training Module. In normal use, the instructor can monitor the trainee driver via a duplicated control and display unit and override gear selector, brake and accelerator pedal of the driver's station. Steering override is available as an option. Crew consists of a trainee driver, instructor, plus up to two additional trainee passengers. The Australian, Dutch (8), German (10) and Lithuanian (2) armies all ordered driver training vehicles.

=== Repair and Recovery ===
ARTEC outlines a Recovery and repair mission module, and separate Repair and Recovery mission modules.

As part of Land 400 Phase 2 deliveries, Australia will receive 11 CRV-REP (Combat Reconnaissance Vehicle - Repair) and 10 CRV-REC (Combat Reconnaissance Vehicle - Recovery). The repair variant will be fitted with a crane, the recovery variant a winch. The recovery variant will be fitted with a R400S-MK2-D-HD RWS remote weapon station mounting an unspecified weapon. Both variants have a crew of three. Of the additional 12 mission modules ordered, one will be in repair configuration, and two in recovery. Australia's choice of separate repair and recovery modules is believed to be due to the difficulties of achieving the required lift (crane) and pull (winch) capabilities required within module size and weight constraints of a single module.

The UK will receive 60 modules in Engineer Section Vehicle (ESV) configuration, and 50 in ES Repair (Rep) configuration. Germany is evaluating recovery options for Boxer.

=== Skyranger 30 ===
Boxer was first shown fitted with the Skyranger 30 air defence system turret mission module in March 2021. The Skyranger 30 turret has an autocannon firing time fuzed 30 x 173 mm ammunition and two short range missiles like Stinger or Mistral. It has five AESA radar arrays for 360 degrees coverage and a day and night electro-optical sight for target engagement. Skyranger 30 was ordered by the Bundeswehr in 2024 and will be a key component of the Bundeswehr's Nah- und Nächstbereichsschutz (short- and very-short-range air defence: NNbS).

=== Schakal (Jackal) / IFV RCT30 (PuBo) ===
KNDS offers the Boxer Schakal fitted with a RCT30 unmanned turret mission module. This configuration was also referred to as PuBo (Puma Boxer) because the turret is essentially same as the one used by the German Army's Puma infantry fighting vehicle. It is reported that a RCT30 turret was the initial choice for Lithuania's Boxer IFV, with the decision later reversed on cost grounds. At DIMDEX 2024 a RCT30-equipped Boxer was shown, the vehicle also fitted with a passive radio frequency sensor that is intended to shoot down small unmanned aerial vehicles. Qatari armed forces are reportedly in the process of receiving 10 Boxers with the RCT30. This turret may also be fitted to 148 vehicles required by the Bundeswehr, and for which a decision on procurement is expected later this year (2024), and will be fitted to the additional 72 Boxers IFV RCT30 ordered by the Dutch Army with 48 options.

=== Remote-Controlled Howitzer 155 mm (RCH 155) ===
==== RCH 155 Wheeled ====
The Boxer Remote-Controlled Howitzer 155 mm (RCH 155) mounts a version of the KNDS Deutschland Artillery Gun Module (AGM). This is a further development of the tracked Panzerhaubitze 2000 155 mm 52-calibre artillery system. The system was originally developed to meet potential requirements of export customers for a wheeled base platform as this has greater strategic mobility than the tracked and heavier PzH 2000-type system. In December 2020 the then Krauss-Maffei Wegmann (KMW) announced in a press release that it planned to begin developmental testing of the Remote Controlled Howitzer (RCH) 155 mm gun in 2021, this a remotely controllable version of the original RCH 155. In September 2022, 18 RCH 155 were announced as a purchase from Ukraine through a German aid fund at a cost of €216 million. A further 18 RCH 155 were ordered on 18 February 2024, and in June 2024 it was stated that the total RCH 155 for Ukraine was 54, with initial deliveries no earlier than the end of 2024. In April 2024, the UK MoD became the second confirmed user of the type when it announced the selection of the RCH 155 for the British Army's Mobile Fires Platform programme, as the successor to the AS90.

==== RCH 155 Tracked ====
In October 2025, a variant on the tracked Boxer was presented by KNDS Deutschland at AUSA 2025, it is known as the "RCH-155 Tracked".

=== Joint Fire Support ===
There are two Joint fire support mission module configurations offered by ARTEC, and they are simply designated Joint fire support A and Joint fire support B.

The Bundeswehr's Joint Fire Support Team (JFST) contract was awarded in September 2021 and renderings shown by the company show Boxer (designated Joint Fire Support Team schwer (JFSTsw)) fitted with a mission module based around current in-service JFST/German Army equipment, and another fitted with equipment outlined in a JFST contract award to Thales in 2022. In November 2022, Lieutenant Colonel Karlheinz Boehnke, Multi-Role Armoured Vehicle (MRAV) representative in the German Army Concepts and Capabilities Development Centre, said he expected the two JFSTsw prototypes ordered in September 2021 to be delivered in 2024–2026, followed by 20 vehicles, which will operate in pairs, in 2028–2031.

As part of Land 400 Phase 2 deliveries, Australia will receive 29 CRV-JFS (Combat Reconnaissance Vehicle - Joint Fire Support) as part of Block II deliveries. These have a crew of six. Will be fitted with a R400S-MK2-D-HD RWS remote weapon station mounting an unspecified weapon. Five of the additional 12 mission modules ordered will be in CVR-JFS configuration.

=== Combat Reconnaissance Vehicle (CRV) Reconnaissance variant ===
The Combat Reconnaissance Vehicle (CRV) is a development of the baseline Boxer designed to fulfil the Australian Land 400 Phase 2 requirement. The chassis selected is rated at a GVW of 38.5-tonnes and is a hybrid of Boxer A2 and A3 configurations. The Combat Reconnaissance Vehicle (CRV) Reconnaissance variant, or simply reconnaissance is the main CRV variant, 133 of the 211 vehicles ordered in this configuration. The Combat Reconnaissance Vehicle (CRV) Reconnaissance variant is fitted with the Rheinmetall Defense Lance Medium Calibre Turret.

The first twelve Boxer CRV Reconnaissance were delivered as Block 1 vehicles from Germany, the turret on these only equipped with the MK 30-2/ABM cannon, but it will eventually be upgraded to the Block II configuration. The other, 121 CRV Reconnaissance are being manufactured in Australia, and will be equipped with 2 Spike LR2 missile in the redesigned turret. Whether the ADF's chosen active protection system, Elbit's Iron Fist, will be used on the CRV's Block II Lance turret is unknown, as the integration of the system has caused delays in the program due to excess weight. However, the use of the system is still being invested in.

The 123 Schwerer Waffenträger Infanterie (sWaTrg Inf) HWC infantry vehicles ordered by the German Army in a deal valued at €1.95 billion are based on the Australian Combat Reconnaissance Vehicle (CRV) Reconnaissance variant. The stabilisation system for the turrets is supplied by Curtiss Wright in Switzerland.

=== Vilkas (Wolf) / IFV Samson ===
Vilkas/Wolf is a Lithuanian designation for Boxer fitted with a Rafael Advanced Defense Systems Samson Mk II RCT turret. ARTEC refer to this configuration as IFV Samson. 89 of 91 Lithuania's Vilkas/Wolf order are fitted with the Samson Mk II RCT turret, this mounting a fully stabilised Orbital ATK Mk 44S 30 mm dual-feed cannon, 7.62 mm co-axial MG, and Spike-LR missiles. A range of turret options were bid including the unmanned turret from the PSM Puma IFV. Lithuania received four variants of the IFV, 55 IFV squad leader, 18 IFV platoon leader; 12 IFV company leader; 4 IFV command post. Variants vary by mission fit primarily in the areas of additional voice and data communication equipment as well as modified BMS.

== Other variants including prototypes, concepts and developmental platforms ==
=== Air defence systems ===
- Boxer Mobile LWS The Boxer Mobile LWS (laser weapon system) demonstrator was a version of the Boxer armoured medical treatment vehicle that was fitted with a RWS coupled to a Rheinmetall RMG 12.7 mm HMG, integrated with an unmanned protected turret and fitted with a fully-automated MANTIS turret. No further development or production has taken place.
- Boxer C-UAS As of 2024 ARTEC does not list a Counter UAS mission module configuration as an option for Boxer. However, previously in December 2019 Germany's BAAINBw ordered 10 Boxer C-UAS (Counter UAS) systems, placing contracts with Kongsberg and Hensoldt, with delivery to be completed within 24 months. The vehicle was stated to be equipped with combination of Kongsberg's Protector RWS armed with 40 mm grenade launcher with airburst ammunition and Hensoldt's Spexer 2000 3D radar. Delivery of the first systems to the Bundeswehr was scheduled by the close of 2020, with these used to protect the NATO Response Force Very High Readiness Joint Task Force (VJTF) when Germany took leadership of the service in 2023. As of early 2024 there is no evidence this requirement came to fruition, despite a May 2023 statement by Lieutenant Colonel Karlheinz Boehnke, Multi-Role Armoured Vehicle (MRAV) Boxer representative in the German Army Concept and Capabilities Development Centre, that deliveries would occur 2023–2024.
- Boxer Skyranger 35 Boxer has been shown fitted with the Oerlikon Skyranger 35 air defence system turret. This is armed with Rheinmetall's 35mm x 228 calibre Revolver Gun, this having the option of a dual ammunition feeding system that allows the choice of two types of shell. It would primarily fire the 35 mm Advanced Hit Efficiency And Destruction (AHEAD) ammunition, which although optimised for the air defence role is also effective against ground targets including lightly protected vehicles. The secondary nature would be Frangible Armour-Piercing Discarding Sabot (FAPDS) ammunition. The gun has a cyclic rate of fire of 1,000 rounds a minute, with a typical aerial target being engaged by a burst of 20 to 24 rounds. Skyranger 35 is heavier than the Skyranger 30 variant which has been ordered by Germany.

=== Anti-tank systems ===
- Boxer Overwatch A demonstrator of a Boxer Overwatch was unveiled at the DVD 2022 event (Defence Vehicle Dynamics). The Overwatch is a mission module equipped with a Brimstone missiles launcher. This variant was developed by RBSL in collaboration with MBDA with the aim to meet the requirement for the "Mounted Close Combat Overwatch" programme. The requirements for the programme are to provide an anti-armour capability at a range of 10 km or more, with missiles weighing up to 50 kg. It is a modern and more capable variant of the retired Swingfire anti-tank guided missile (ATGM) mounted on the FV102 Striker. In its concept form, the Boxer Overwatch mission module carries a single eight-cell launcher for 53 kg Brimstone 3 missiles facing towards the left side of the vehicle. The launcher is lowered to a horizontal position for travelling and raised before a fire mission.
- Future Armoured Vertical Launcher Lockheed Martin UK is competing for the MCCO programme. Its offer is a vertical launching module for the Boxer with 16 missiles, likely the JAGM. This system would be connected to other systems of the British Army such as the MORPHEUS via the link-16. These other systems could provide targeting data.

=== Electronic warfare ===
- Boxer Knifefish In 2023 it was disclosed that Germany and the Netherlands plan a Boxer jamming variant. The Boxer Knifefish jamming variant would exist in two versions – ultra-high frequency (UHF)/very high frequency (VHF) and high frequency (HF). Delivery of at least one Boxer jamming prototype is planned by 2028.

=== Engineering and support variants ===
- Boxer Armoured Recovery Module (ARM) The Boxer ARM is a repair and recovery mission module developed by FFG to provide Boxer users with a recovery and maintenance capability as well as an operational means to mount mission modules onto drive modules. The ARM was first shown in 2019. Lieutenant Colonel Karlheinz Boehnke, Multi-Role Armoured Vehicle (MRAV) Boxer representative in the German Army Concept and Capabilities Development Centre, stated in 2023 that he expected plans for a Boxer recovery vehicle to be approved by the end of 2024. Other repair and recovery options are being developed/explored in addition to the FFG ARM.
- Boxer WFEL bridging module concept The Boxer WFEL bridging module concept is a configuration designed by WFEL and KMW as a private venture, to meet the need to integrate the Leguan bridging system onto medium-sized vehicles. The modules can deploy various bridges:
  - a 14 meters long bridge, capable of a MLC (load class) of 80 or 100.
  - a 22 meters long bridge, capable of a MLC (load class) of 50
- Mine clearance Mine clearing versions of Boxer are planned, this was confirmed by the Lieutenant Colonel Karlheinz Boehnke, Multi-Role Armoured Vehicle (MRAV) Boxer representative in the German Army Concept and Capabilities Development Centre, at SAE Media Group's Future Armoured Vehicles Survivability (FAVS) 2023 conference held in London during November 2023. Lithuania will receive a Boxer engineering variant that it is reported will directly integrate engineering equipment, such as that used for mine clearance, into the existing Lithuanian Infantry Fighting Vehicle configuration.

=== Indirect fire ===
- Boxer Mortar Mission Module This module was developed by RBSL, and integrates the Mortar Weapon System of Rheinmetall Norway with an automated aiming capability. It was tested in September 2022 with a 120mm mortar, but a smaller calibre could be used on the system.
- Boxer NEMO It was presented at DVD 2024 as a demonstrator. Rheinmetall and Patria collaborated on this module, aiming to offer it to the UK for its armoured mortar carrier need. This module was developed and built by Rheinmetall UK. And the platform used with the turret was the British Boxer. Compared to a standard mission module, for the NEMO configuration the roofline is higher, this to allow crew egress from beneath the turret basket. The turret is also located to the left of the hull, this enabling the driver to leave the vehicle to the rear.
- Boxer ARTHUR At the 2020 Omega Future Indirect Fires/Mortar Systems conference in the UK, Saab displayed a concept of its ARTHUR Mod D counter-battery radar mounted onto the mission module of a Boxer. Saab said ARTHUR Mod D was its “answer to the requirements for a highly mobile, agile, and long range WLR, supporting high tempo brigade and divisional manoeuvre operations. The technology is drawing on [both] existing and evolutions of Saab in-house sensor technologies”, and can be seen “as a spiral development” of ARTHUR.

=== Infantry fighting vehicles ===
- Protector RT60 The Boxer was tested in May 2021 with an IFV module equipped with the Kongsberg Protector RT60 turret. The module was tested in Norway following a collaboration with KMW for its integration.
- Turra 30 V10 unmanned turret Rheinmetall presented a new mission module at IDET 2025, an IFV module equipped with the Turra 30 V10 unmanned turret developed by EVPU. The turret includes a Mk44 Bushmaster II chain gun, a twin-launcher for the Spike LR2 missile. The gunner uses an electro-optical sight, and the commander has a panoramic sight. The turret is lightly armoured (composites), but it uses an active protection system, the Harpia by EVPU.

=== Fire support vehicles ===
- Boxer, direct fire support In April 2020 John Cockerill Defense revealed that it was supplying a C3105 two-person turret armed with 105 mm rifled gun to KMW so that it could be incorporated onto Boxer. The company stated that the development was funded by internal R&D budgets. ARTEC's mission module range includes a Main gun 105 mm configuration.
- KMW RCT120 KMW presented a tracked variant of the Boxer at Eurosatory 2022. It is designed to be compatible with the mission modules of the wheeled Boxer. The mission module presented is the RCT120 which includes a remote controlled turret equipped with a 120mm smoothbore tank gun, 2 Spike LR missiles, a hard-kill Trophy APS and a 12.7mm RCWS Natter. It also offers a coaxial 30 mm gun as an option.

=== Technology demonstrators ===
- Boxer JODAA Boxer JODAA (Joint Operational Demonstrator for Advanced Applications) is a technology demonstrator used by the German Army and Rheinmetall Landsysteme to carry out R&D studies around potential Boxer improvements. It is based on the Boxer armoured medical treatment vehicle variant and is regularly refitted for a range of purposes and roles.

== Gallery ==
ARTEC Boxer

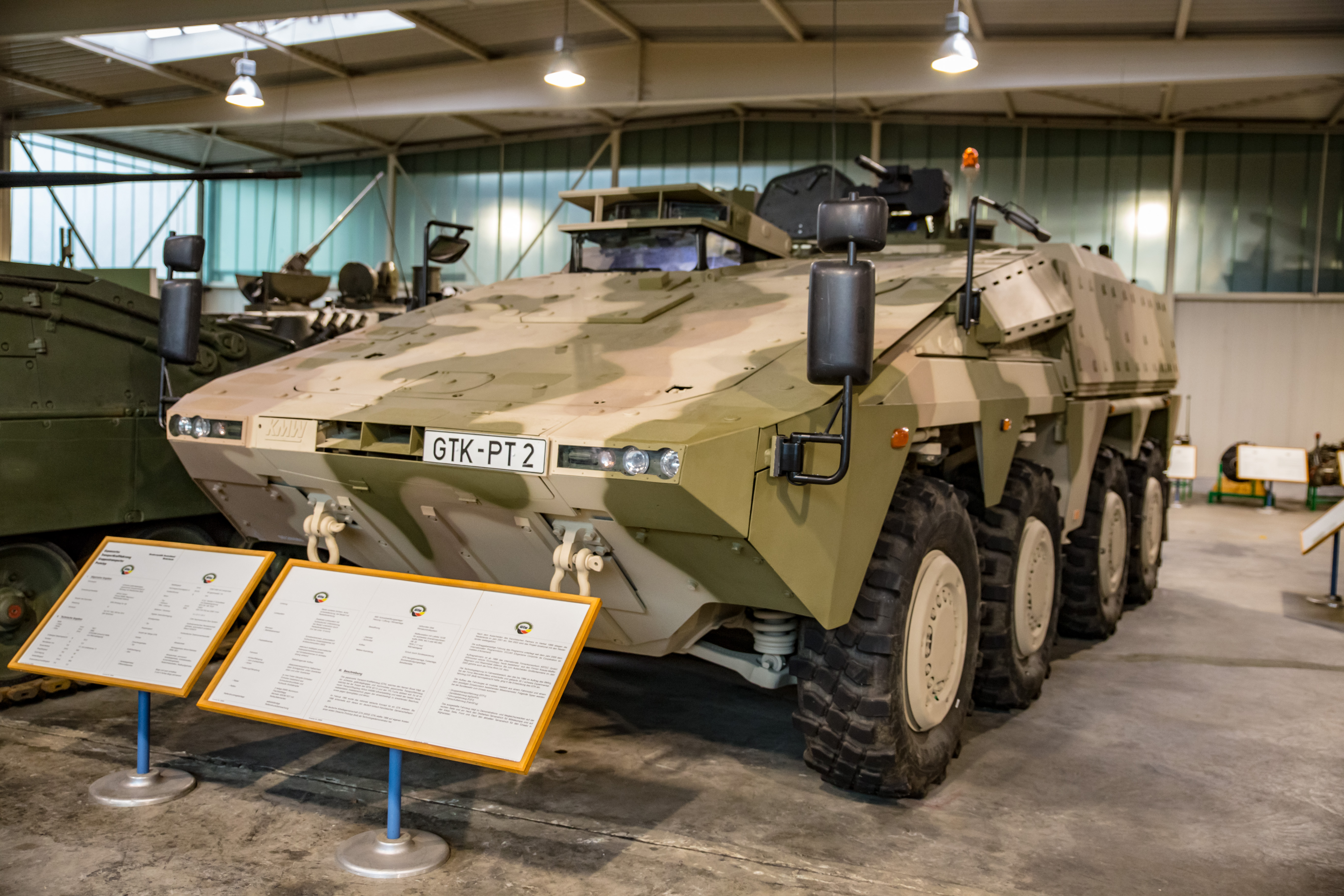
Boxer prototype 2

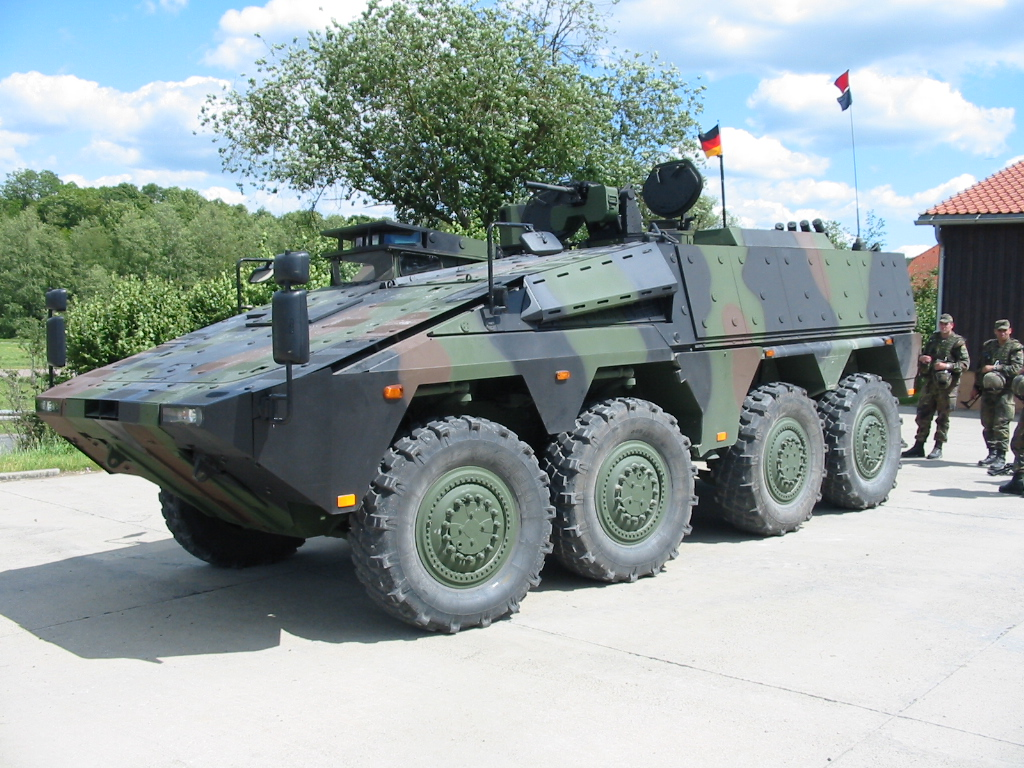
A Boxer prototype

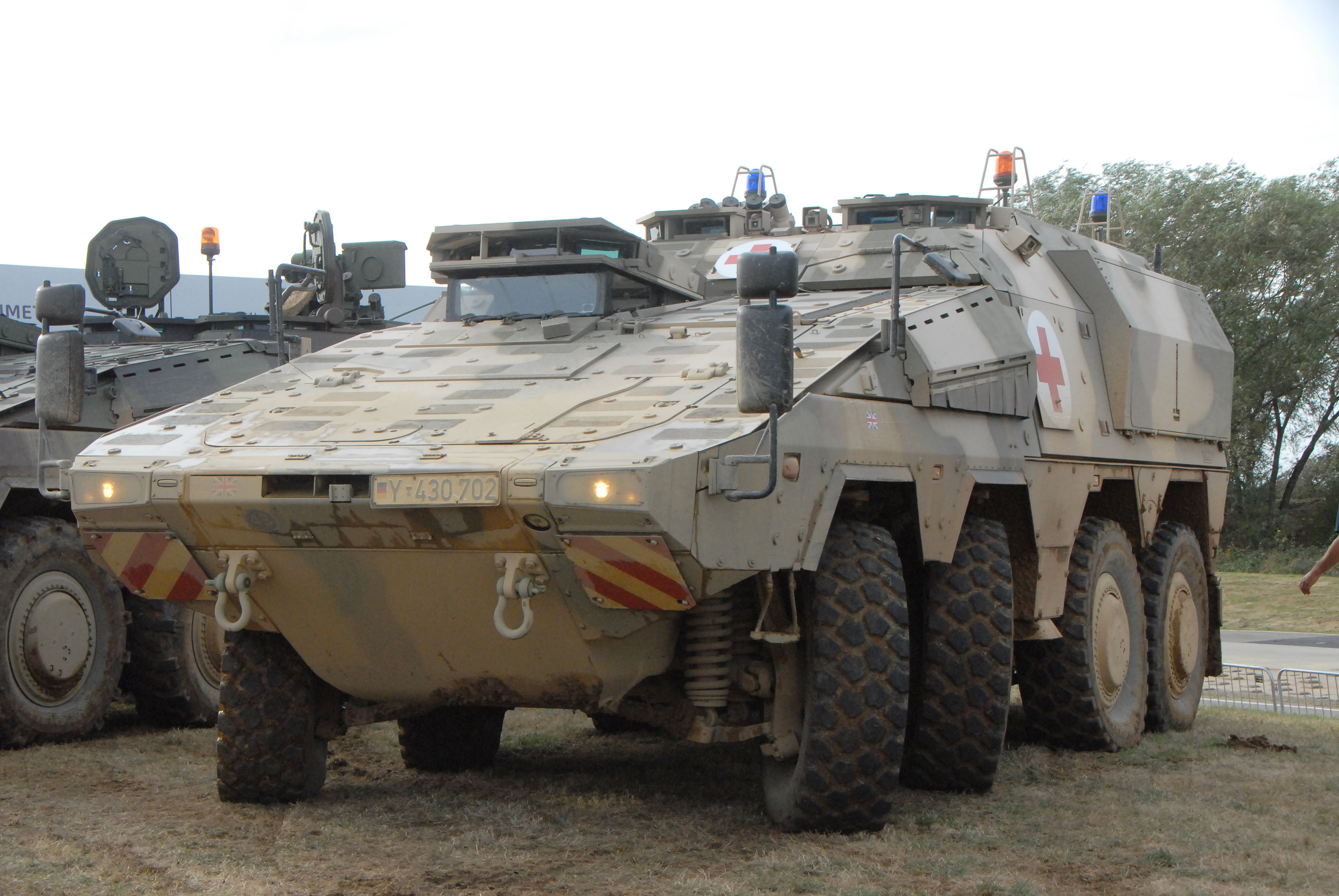
German Army Boxer - ambulance configuration

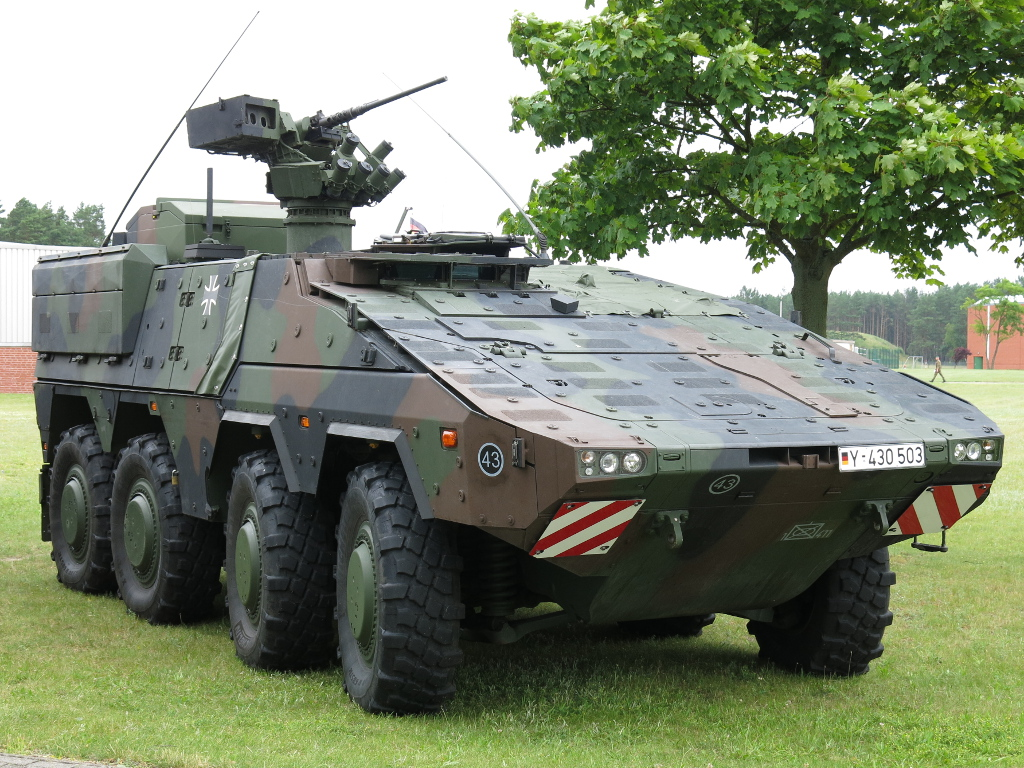
German Army Boxer - C2 with FLW-200 RCWS

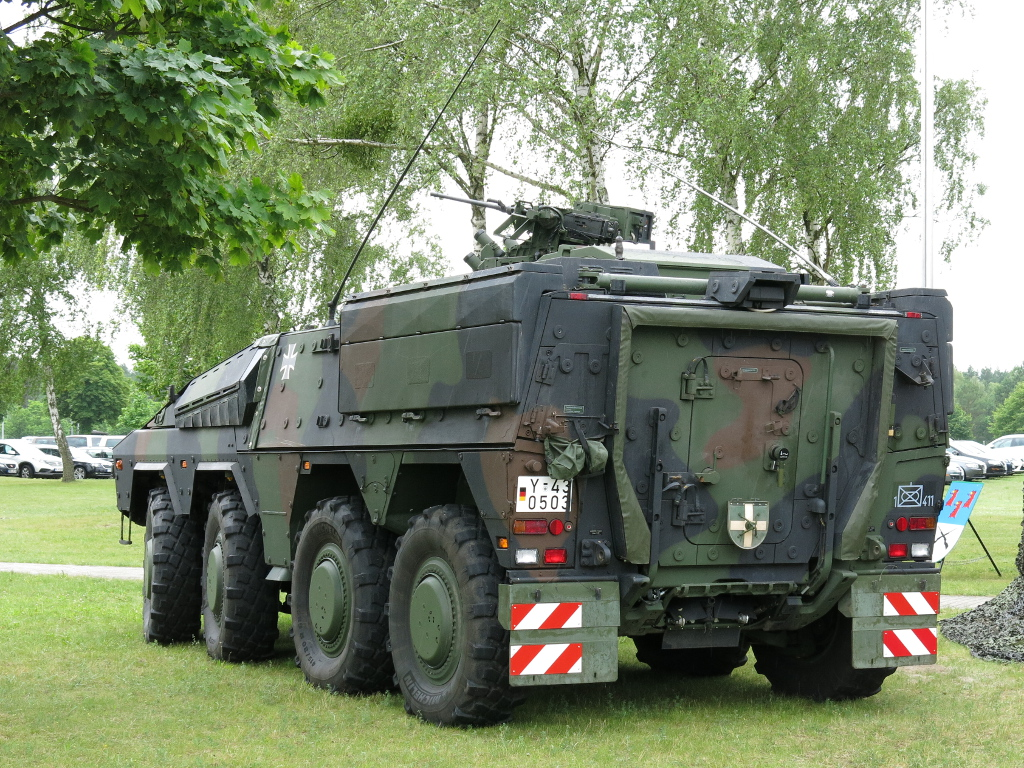
German Army Boxer - C2 with FLW-200 RCWS

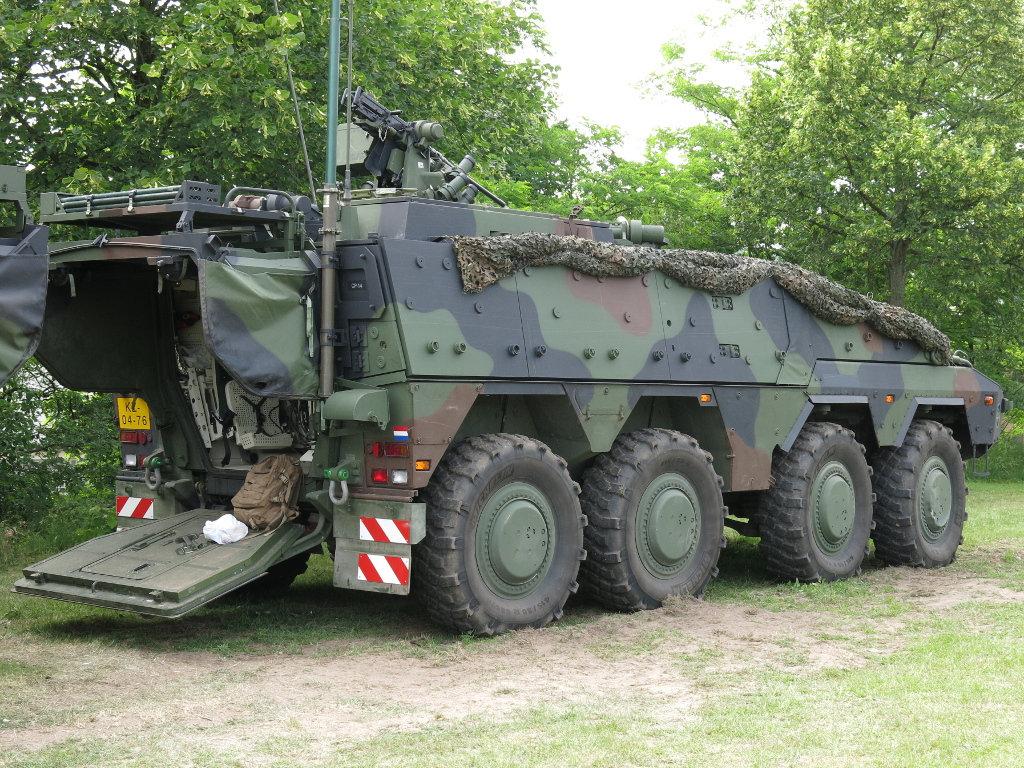
Dutch Army Boxer - C2

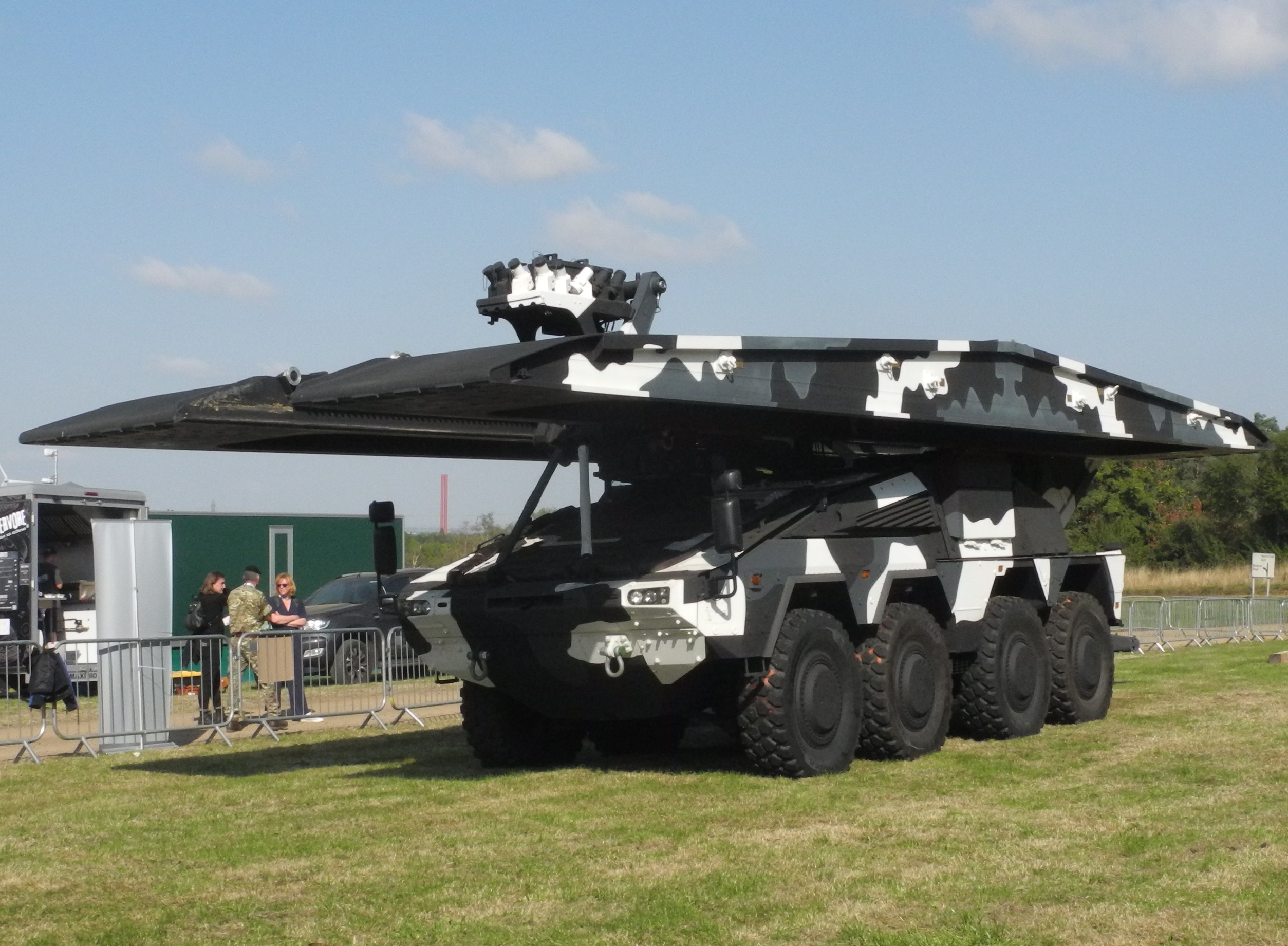
Boxer bridge layer Leguan prototype

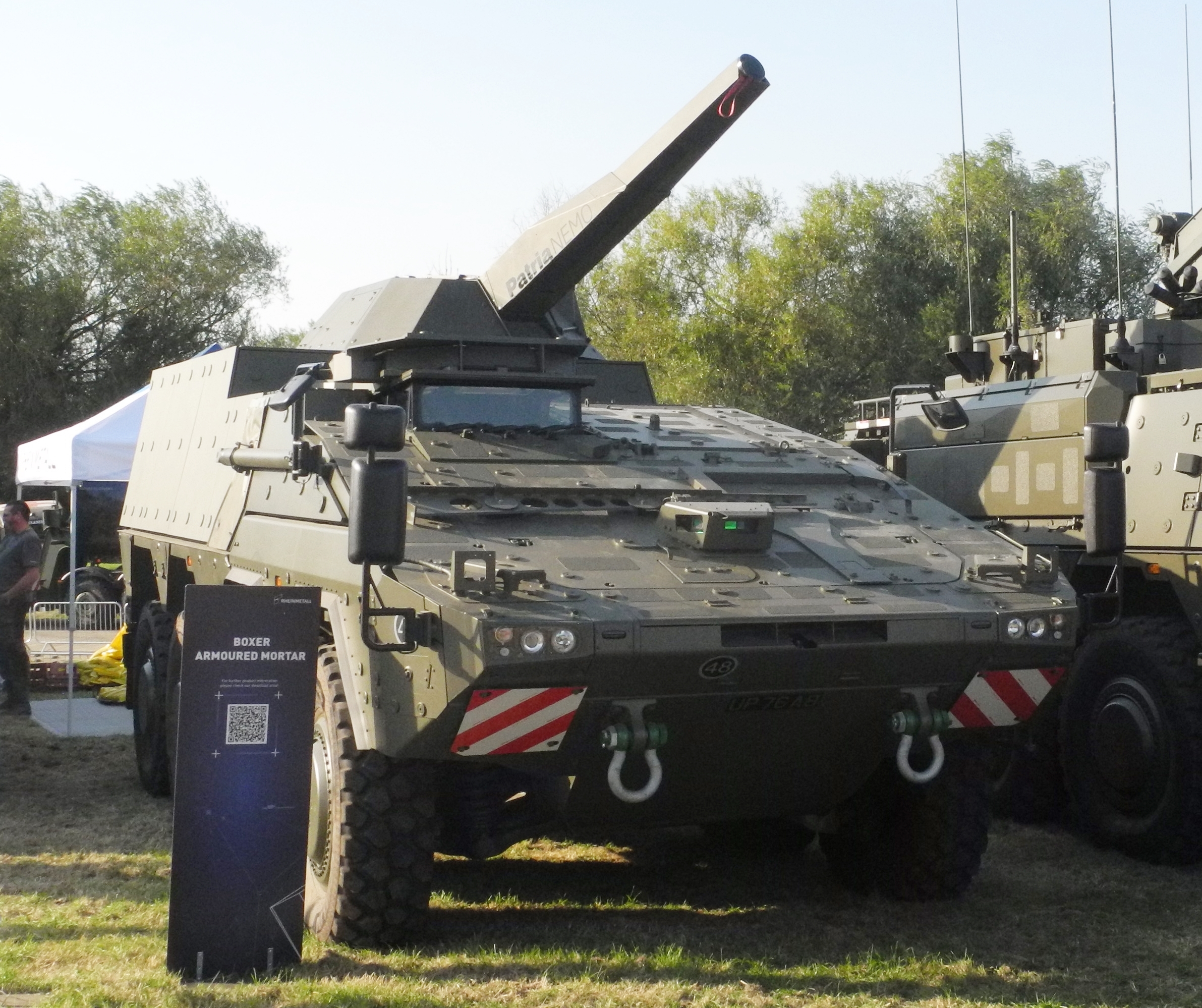
Boxer mortar carrier prototype - Patria NEMO

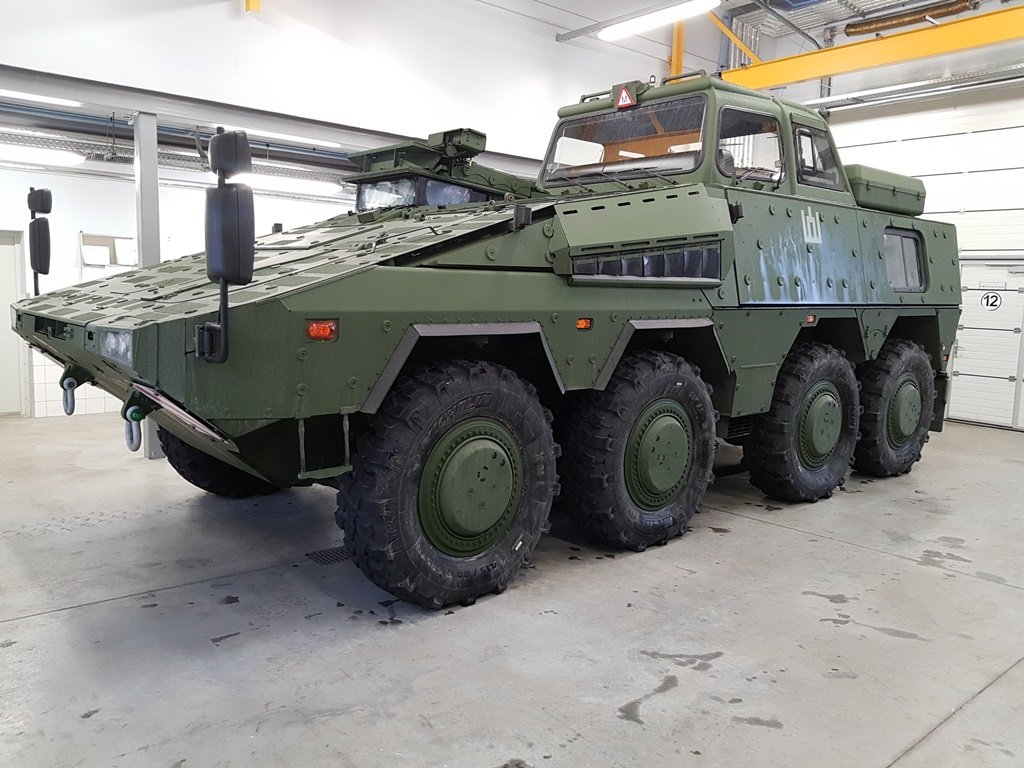
Boxer Driver training variant

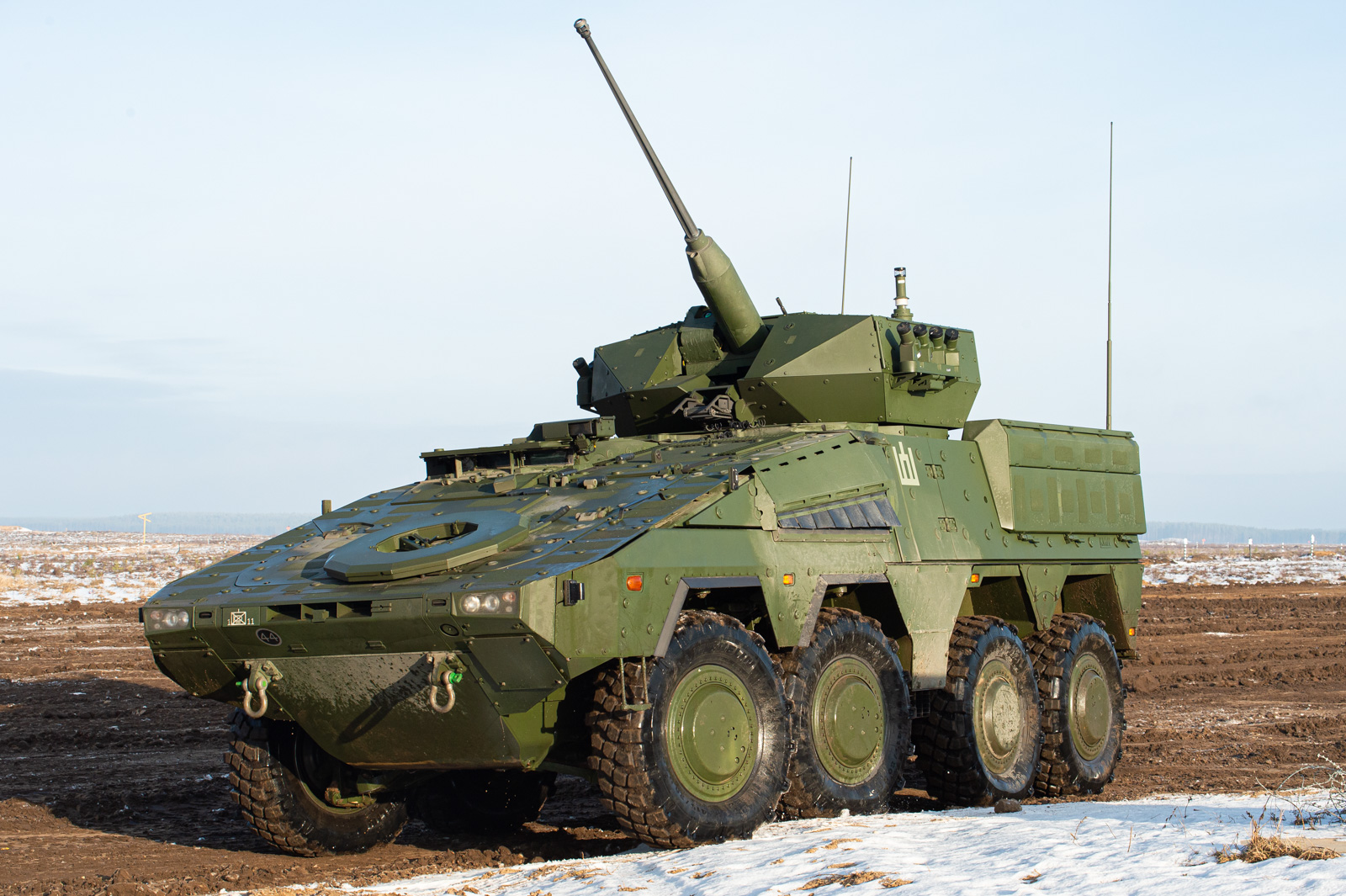
Vilkas / Wolf IFV of the Lithuanian Army - Samson Mk II RCT turret

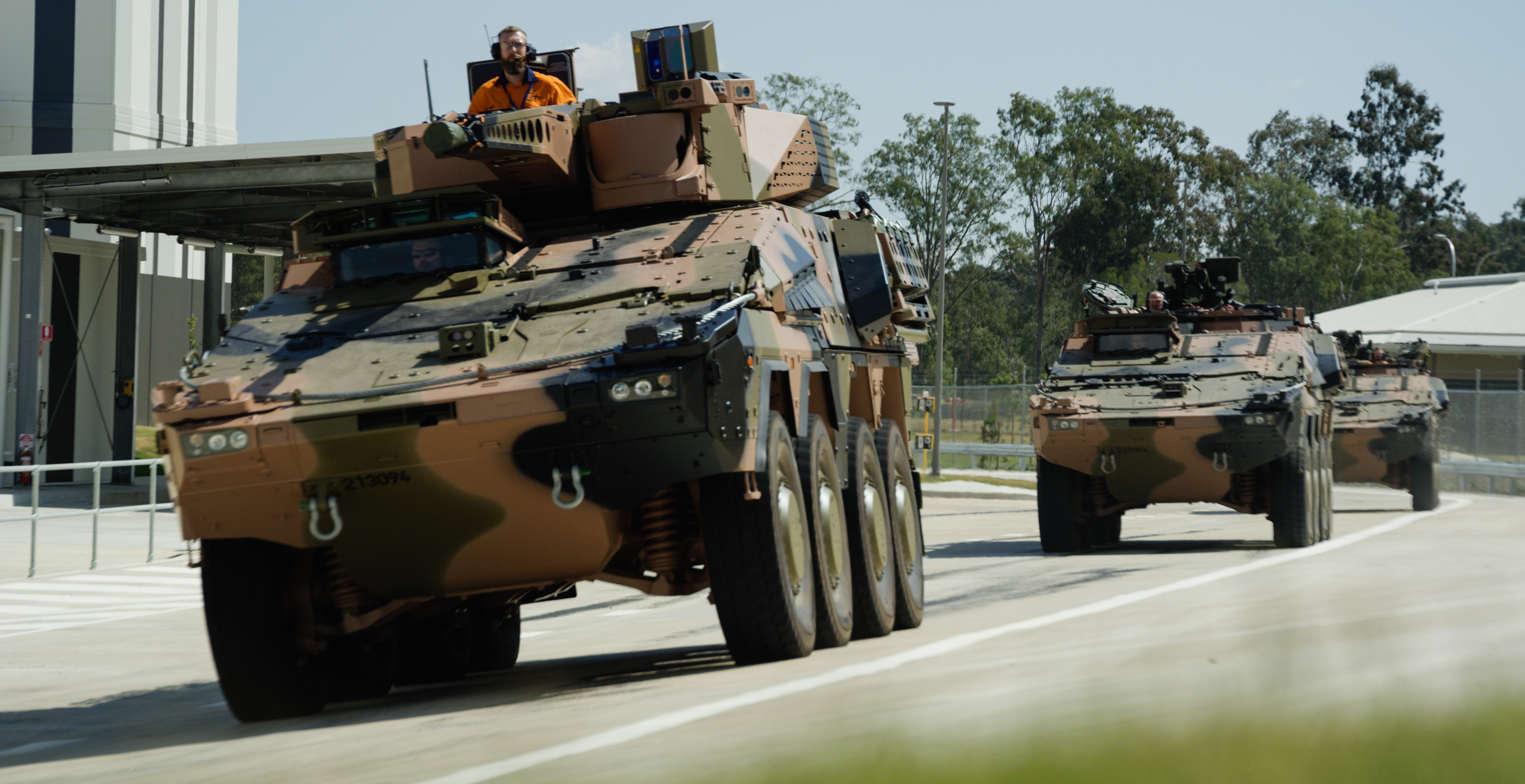
Australian Army - Boxer CRV + 2 Boxer CRV-MPVs

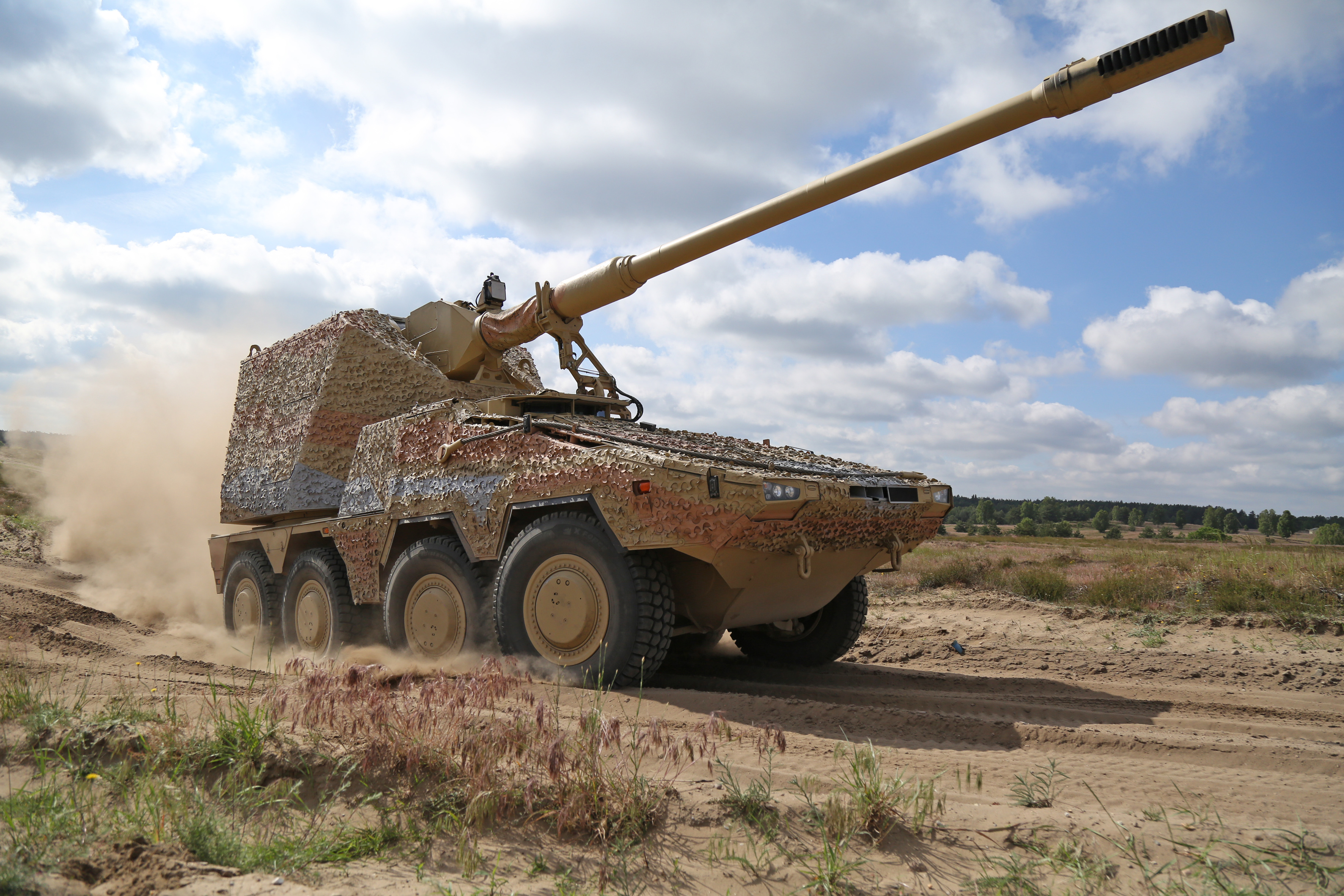
Boxer RCH-155 demonstrator

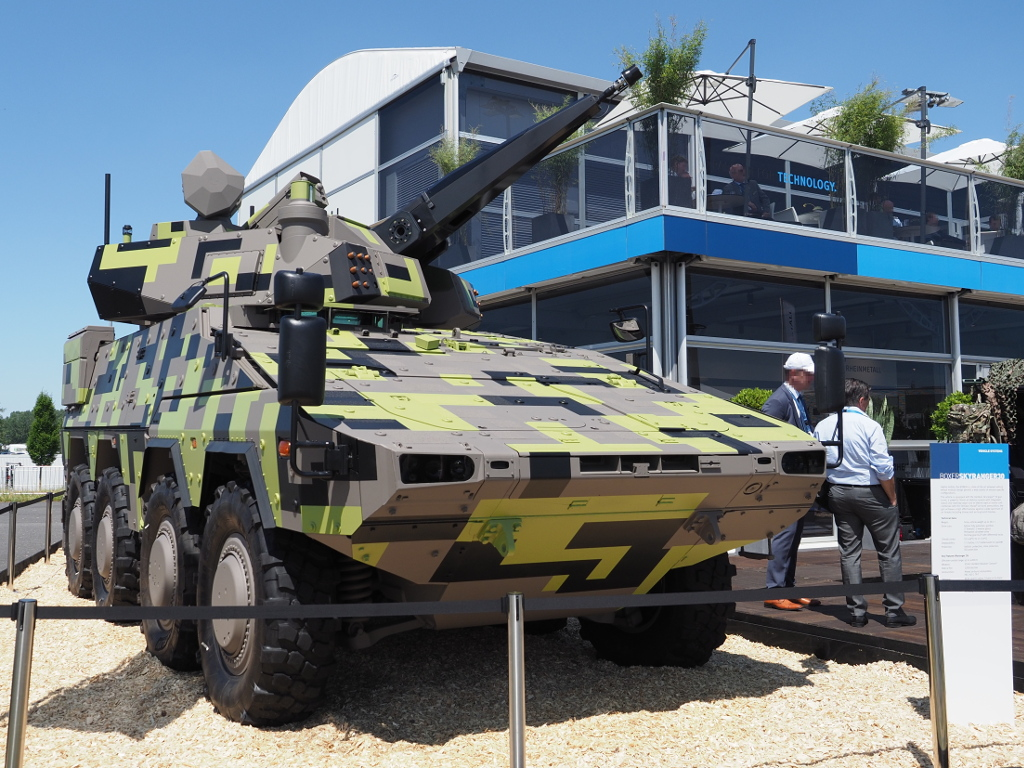
Boxer Skyranger 30

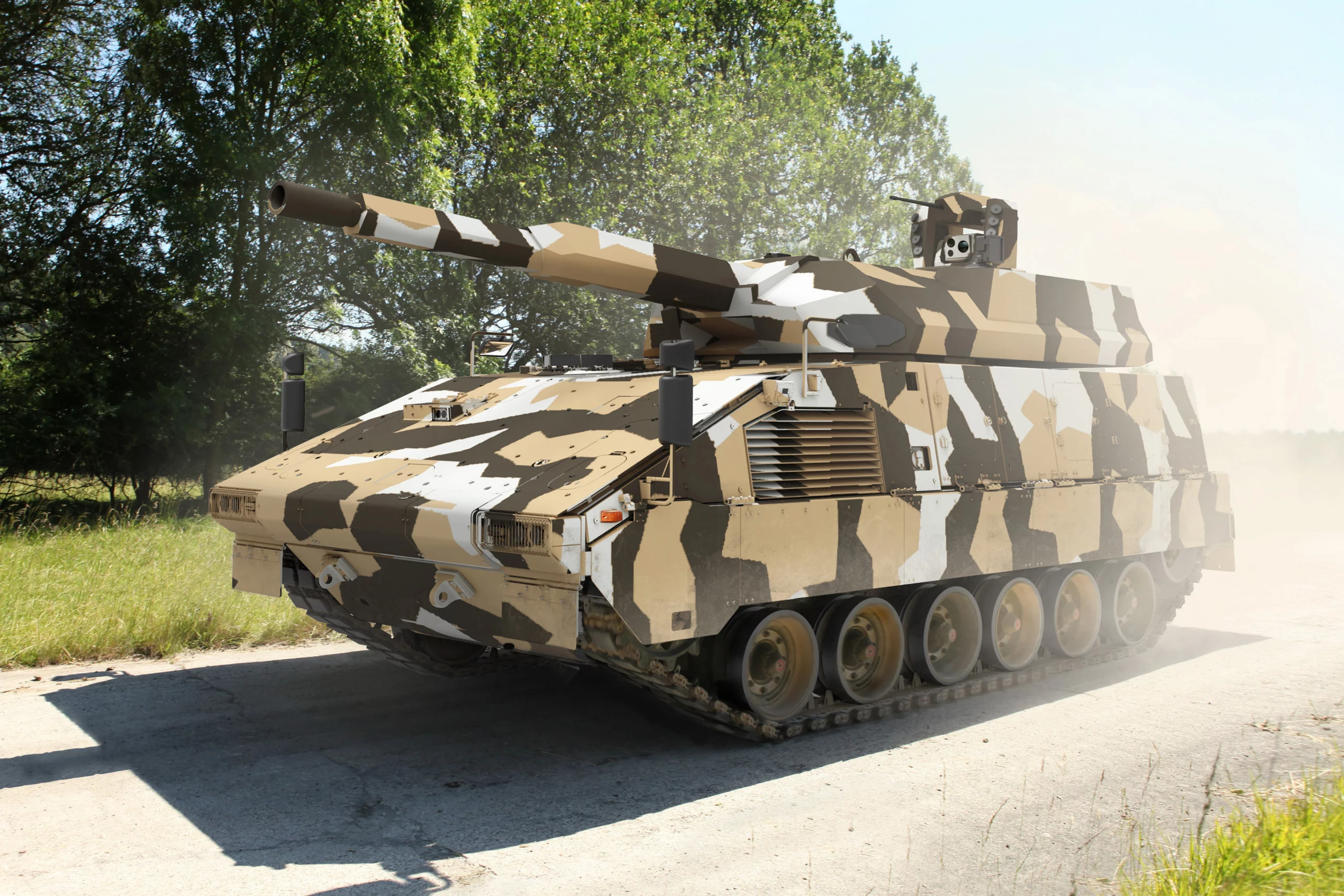
Tracked Boxer demonstrator with RCT120 Mission Module

== Operators ==
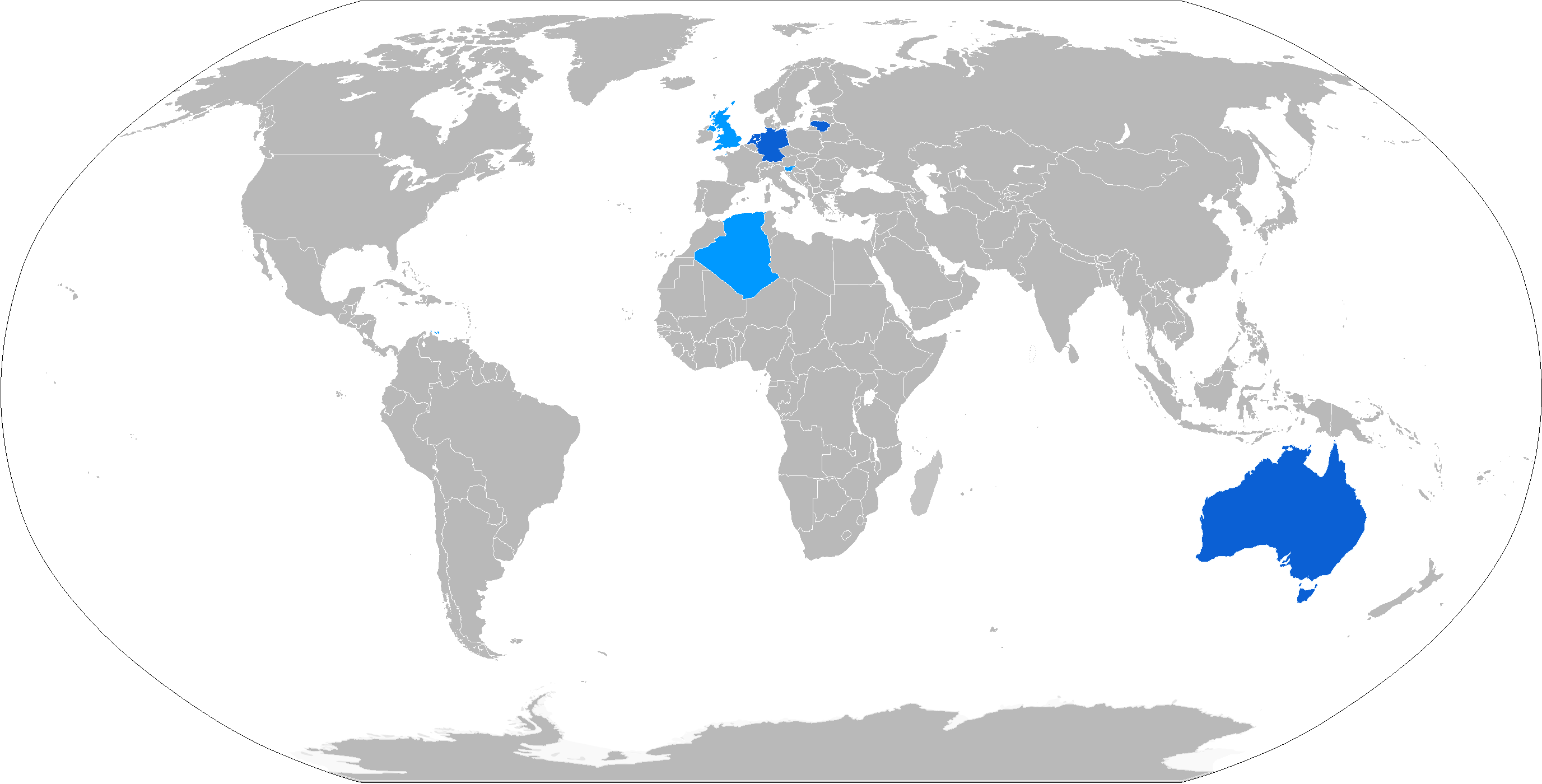
Operators Current Future or potential

=== Current operators ===
(Australia) Australian Army (>25 + 186 on order)

Under Land 400 Phase II Australia will receive 211 Boxer designated Combat Reconnaissance Vehicle (CRV), with deliveries expected until at least 2026.

The first 25 CRVs were manufactured in Germany through to 2021 to meet an early Australian capability requirement for familiarisation and training. The first CRVs were formally handed over to the Australian Army in September 2019. Prior to delivery the Boxers were modified locally with Australian-specific communications and battlefield management systems and fitted temporarily with the Kongsberg Protector RWS that previously equipped Australian ASLAVs deployed to Iraq and Afghanistan. Training with the first-delivered vehicles commenced by October 2020. The first 25 'Block I' vehicles consisted of 13 in Multi-Purpose Vehicle (MPV) configuration and 12 in CRV Reconnaissance configuration.

Production of the remaining 186 Block II platforms was scheduled to begin in late 2022 at RDA's Military Vehicle Centre of Excellence (MILVEHCOE) at Ipswich in Queensland, Rheinmetall's biggest facility outside Germany. Australia's Boxer CRV is scheduled to be fitted with the Israeli Spike-LR2 anti-tank missile.

The 186 Block II CRVs are made up of 121 in the Combat Reconnaissance Vehicle (CRV) Reconnaissance variant, 29 in a joint fires support configuration (CRV-JFS), 15 in a command and control configuration (CRV-C2), 10 in a repair configuration (with crane) (CRV-REP), and 11 in a recovery configuration (with winch) (CRV-REC). Also included are 12 additional mission modules: 5 CRV-JFS; 4 CRV-C2; 2 CRV-REC; 1 CRV-REP. Also included are 20 frames for mission modules that allow these to be transported by truck, and within ISO dimensions. The contract includes an option for 11 ambulance mission modules.

The first Block II CRV variants were delivered to the Australian Army in time for the 2025 iteration of Exercise Talisman Sabre.

(Germany) German Army (403 + 609 on order of August 2026)

1. The original German Army order consisted of 272 drive modules and 272 accompanying mission modules. Configurations ordered were 125 in armoured personnel carrier (APC) configuration, 72 in 72 armoured medical treatment vehicle configuration (ambulance), 65 in command configuration, and 12 driver training vehicles. First production example delivered in 2009. All the vehicles chassis were modernised to the A2 standard by 2025.
2. The second order called for all 131 vehicles ordered to be of a revised A2 APC new configuration. Order placed in 2015 with deliveries concluding in 2021.
3. The third German order is for a Joint Fire Support Team (JFST) configuration, the contract award dating to 2021. Two JFST prototypes have been ordered and these will be delivered 2024–2026.
4. The fourth German order was placed in 2024 and calls for 19 Boxer Skyranger 30. The €595 million contract calls for a prototype at the end of 2024, followed by 18 production vehicles, with an option for 30 more.
5. The fifth German Boxer order calls for 123 Boxer based on the Australian CRV-variant and these were ordered in March 2024, with deliveries from 2025 to 2030.
6. The sixth German order is related to the purchase of 48 Boxer, 38 in the heavy medical variant, and 10 for driver training.
7. The seventh order is for the purchase of 150 Schakal (formerly referred to as the Boxer PuBo), a wheeled infantry fighting vehicle equipped with a KNDS Deutschland RCT30 turret. There is an option of 200 vehicles of this type for the German Army.
8. The eighth order is for 232 Boxer - RCH-155, budget approved in December 2025 that includes:
  - 3 prototypes for Germany
  - 80 production systems
  - 149 planned orders for 2026
9. Ninth order approved by the Bundestag Budget Committee, for additional Schakal IFV in June 2026. The order was placed by OCCAR in August 2026, 35 vehicles for the German Army, and also 34 for the Netherlands.
10. Tenth order approved by the Bundestag Budget Committee for GTK Boxer B0 drive modules with SHORAD modules.

The above information accounts for 547 of the 551 total provided by ARTEC at IAV 2025, the assumption being the unidentified four examples are developmental and/or prototype vehicles.

(Lithuania) Lithuanian Land Force (91 + 27 on order)

Lithuania ordered 91 Boxer A2 in 2016 for €385.6 million, with deliveries from 2017 to 2023. Two driving training vehicles (DTVs) were delivered in December 2017, these followed by 89 Infantry Fighting Vehicles "Vilkas" of which two prototypes were tested in 2018, with deliveries following from 2019 to 2023. The 89 IFVs are split: 55 squad leader vehicles; 18 platoon leaders vehicles; 12 company leader vehicles; 4 command posts vehicles. Following these deliveries Lithuania indicated a desire to acquire a small additional quantity of Boxer in specialist configurations and in October 2024 an order for 27 additional Boxer was announced. Details were limited but deliveries will include an engineering variant that will directly integrate engineering equipment (such as that used for mine clearance) into the existing Lithuanian IFV configuration.

(Qatar) Qatari Army (10)

The Qatari Army is reportedly (as of Q1 2023) in the process of receiving 10 Boxer fitted with a RCT30 unmanned turret and a passive radio frequency sensor for the purpose of protecting against small unmanned aerial vehicles.

The first IFV was transferred in December 2025.

Royal Netherlands Army (220 + 106 on order per June 2026)

The original prototype was delivered to the Dutch Army for evaluation in October in 2003, and the contract for the procurement of 200 Boxer was disclosed in December 2006 at a value of €1.2 billion (€1.429 billion end cost). Deliveries ran from 2013 to 2018. The order called for 92 engineering section vehicles (including battle damage repair vehicles), 52 ambulance, 36 command post, 12 cargo carriers, and eight driver training vehicles.

72 Boxer Schakal (IFV-RCT30) ordered in October 2025, in a common order with the German Army. An additional order was placed by OCCAR in August 2026, 34 for the Netherlands, 35 vehicles for the German Army.

(Ukraine) Ukrainian ground forces (9 + 54 on order)

In September 2022 it was announced that Ukraine would purchase 18 Boxer RCH-155 for €216m, funded from German aid. In February 2024, 18 additional RCH-155 were decided as additional support from Germany to Ukraine. In June 2024, KNDS revealed that 54 were on order in total for Ukraine, meaning that 18 additional RCH-155 had been ordered. The first RCH 155 delivery took place in January 2025, and that same month the delivery of nine Boxer RCT30 IFVs designated AiTO30 FDC and equipped with systems specifically designed for counter-drone operations to protect artillery units from aerial threats was confirmed.

(United Kingdom) British Army (100 + 523 on order)

In November 2019 the UK Ministry of Defence awarded ARTEC a GBP2.3 billion (US$2.97 billion) contract to deliver 523 Boxer in three main configurations, these encompassing nine sub-configurations. In April 2022 it was announced that a further 100 Boxer would be ordered, bringing the total to 623. The British Army plans to achieve a Boxer Initial Operational Capability (IOC) in 2025, and Full Operational Capability (FOC) in 2032.

The UK MoD breaks its Boxer order down by Mechanised Infantry Vehicle (MIV) variant, by Build configuration, and by Role. A MIV variant can have more than one Build configuration, and any number of Roles, making interrogation of quantities difficult. The current totals are broken out by Role only and are given for 523/623 order quantities.

- 85/146 Infantry Carrier Vehicle (ICV)
- 60/60 Engineer Section Vehicle (ESV)
- 62/62 Recce/Fire Support Vehicles (Recce/FSV)
- 28/28 Mortar Carrying Variant (MCV)
- 50/50 Equipment Support/ES Repair (Rep)
- 123/158 Command-and-Control (C2V) and C2 Utility (C2U)
- 19/19 Observation Post Vehicle (OPV)
- 24/24 Beyond-Line-Of-Sight (BLOS) observation platforms
- 11/11 Electronic Warfare and SIGINT (ESWI) platforms
- 61/65 Ambulance

As part of the Mobile Fire Platform programme, the British Army ordered 72 RCH-155 in May 2026.

Deliveries:

- 100 as of June 2026
- As of August 2026, 125 Boxer vehicles have been contractually delivered

=== Future operators ===
Qatar

In September 2024, it was reported that Germany has approved the sale of the RCH 155 for Qatar in exchange for 12 PzH 2000s, which will be transferred to Ukraine.

=== Potential orders ===
(Australia) Australian Army (11)

The option exists to purchase 11 ambulances.

(Czech Republic) Czech Army

The Boxer is offered to the Czech Army as a successor to the Pandur II. The production would be local. It will be in competition with the Patria AMV XP, the Pandur II Evo and the Piranha V.

(Germany) German Army (3,000)

As of early July 2025, the German Army estimated a requirement of up to 2,500 Boxer in different variants. By the end of July 2025, that number was raised to 3,000.

- Air defence:
  - 500 to 600 Skyranger 30
  - 100 IRIS-T SLS launch vehicles

Detailed expected purchases:

- Up to 30 additional Boxer for the NNbS program (Nah- und Nächstbereichs-schutz), equipped with the Skyranger 30 turret, for command and control of SHORAD air-defence. Prototype + 18 ordered in 2024. Prototype/verification vehicle delivered Q1 2025.
- The German Army intends to field four medium brigades and these brigades are planned to be equipped with new Boxer variants, including the Boxer Armoured Infantry Fighting Vehicle (AIFV). While not confirmed, it was reported in May 2024 that the Bundeswehr had selected the RCT30 turret option for the AIFV Boxer. Sources suggested that the Netherlands could also order a batch of RCT30-fitted Boxer. The German project was scheduled for parliamentary approval in Q4 2024, with reports in January 2025 stating that the German order for 150 Boxer AIFV and a batch of 72 for the Netherlands have been delayed to Q2 or Q3 2025 by the German national elections, these to be held on 23 February.
- Option for 200 Jackal IFV.
- Option for 250 Boxer as part of an order in November 2025:
  - 150 sgSanKfz - the ambulance model
  - 100 driver training vehicles
- Other projects include:
  - 79 JFST production vehicles (initial number). As of March 2026, up to 200 of the vehicles are expected to be purchased.
  - Boxer GBF (Geschützte Bewegliche Führungseinrichtung), a command vehicle, unknown quantity.

(Portugal) Portuguese Army

The Chief of Staff of the Portuguese Army confirmed in an interview in October 2025 that the M113A1/A2 vehicles of the Army's Mechanized Brigade would be replaced by Boxer vehicles. Portugal joined the group of countries that, through the European Union's SAFE program, will acquire Boxer vehicles.

Royal Netherlands Army (>130)

Needs mentioned by the Netherlands Army:

- At least 10 Boxer for electronic warfare missions to replace the TPZ Fuchs EloKa are planned to be purchased by the Netherlands Army.
- As of October 2025, 72 Boxer Schakal - IFV (the same as the German Jackal, equipped with the KNDS DE RCT30 turret of the Puma IFV), and with an option for a further 48 vehicles.

=== Cancelled orders ===
(Slovenia) Slovenian Army

In March 2018, Slovenia announced the selection of the Boxer, with 48 vehicles planned in a configuration close to the Lithuanian variant Vilkas IFV. Following an initial postponement, in May 2022, Slovenia signed a contract with ARTEC to procure 45 Boxer. In September 2022, the Slovenian government announced the cancellation of the Boxer contract.

=== Competitions lost / potential sales not concluded ===
(Bulgaria) Bulgarian Land Forces

In 2017, Bulgaria invited companies to submit offers for a future IFV and other combat support vehicles (reconnaissance, combat engineering, ambulance) based on a 8×8 armoured vehicle. Over time, several offers were made by various competitors and in September 2023, General Dynamics Land Systems was awarded the contract for Stryker.

(Japan) Japanese Ground Self-Defense Force

Japan requested information regarding Boxer to succeed the 8×8 Type 96 APC, especially as the Komatsu proposal collapsed, there was an opportunity to join the ARTEC collaboration, however in 2019 the type was not one of three preselected bidders for this program, with Patria's AMV^{XP} selected in December 2022.

(Spain) Spanish Army

In 2015, a program to replace the VEC-M1, the BMR-M1 and part of the M113 fleet was launched by the Spanish Army. Competitors included Boxer, and in September 2015 GDELS' Piranha V was selected. In December 2019, the program was cancelled and relaunched, and in August 2020 the Piranha V was again announced as the winner.

(Switzerland) Swiss Army

Starting in 2022, the Swiss Army conducted a program to select a successor to the M109 KAWEST WE as part of the "Artillerie Wirkplattform und Wirkmittel 2026" program, with the RCH 155 mounted on either the Boxer A3 or the Mowag Piranha IV 10×10, and the BAE Bofors Archer, participating in the competition. In November 2024, the Mowag Piranha IV-mounted RCH 155 was selected.

== See also ==
Comparable 8x8 APC:

- Patria AMV – (Finland)
  - KTO Rosomak – (Poland)
- Pandur II – (Austria)
- Mowag Piranha V – (Switzerland)
- Freccia IFV – (Italy)
- Eitan AFV – (Israel)
- Stryker – (United States, Canada)
- LAV 6 – (Canada)
- VPK-7829 Bumerang – (Russia)
