= M1117 armored security vehicle =

Internal security vehicle

M1117 Armored Security Vehicle (ASV)
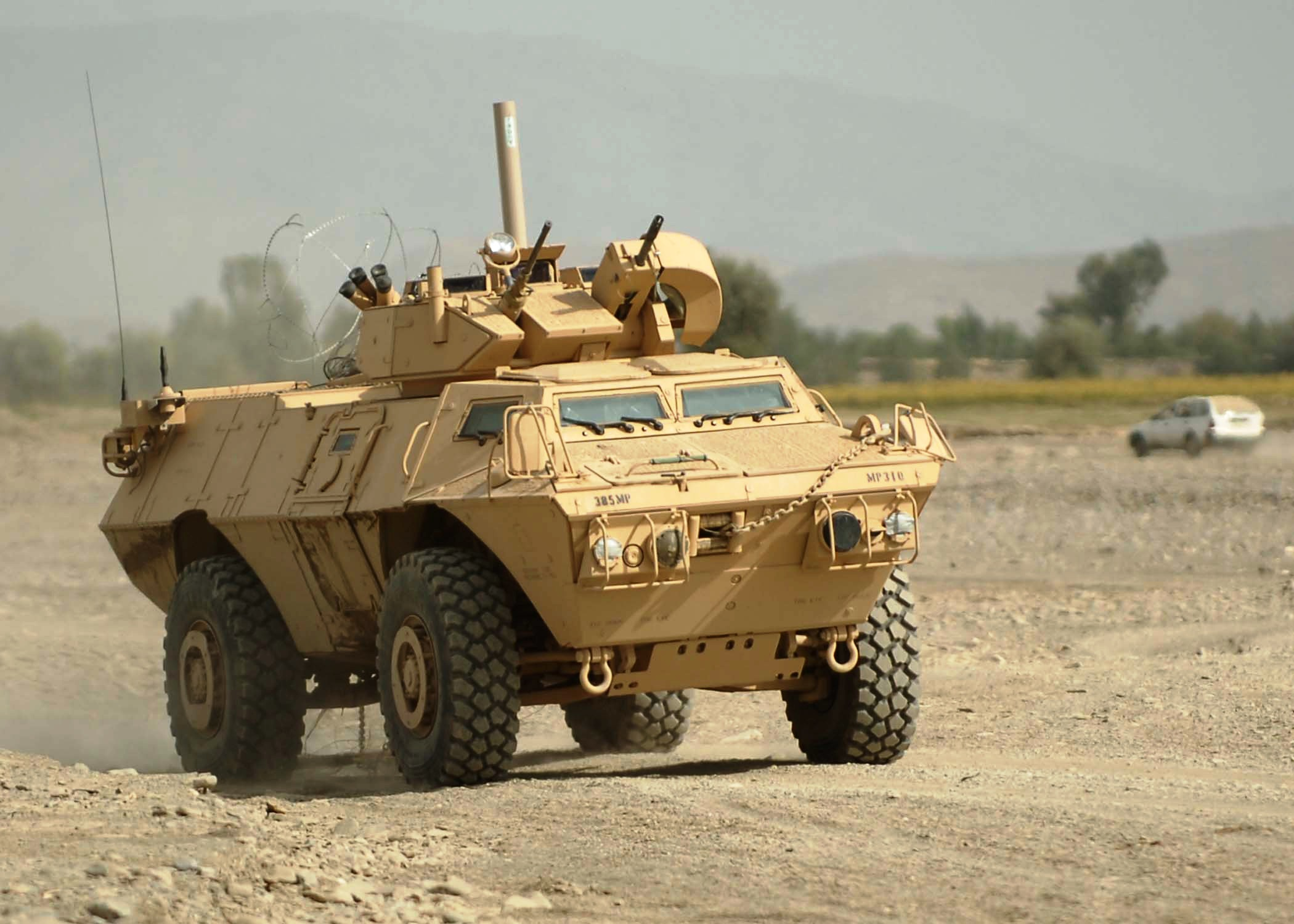
- A U.S. Army M1117 armored security vehicle in Khost Province, Afghanistan, in September 2007
- Type: Internal security vehicle
- Place of origin: United States

Service history
- In service: 1999–present
- Used by: See Operators
- Wars: War in Afghanistan; Iraq War; Iraqi insurgency (2011–2013); Colombian Conflict; Syrian Civil War; Russo-Ukrainian War

Production history
- Designer: Cadillac Gage
- Manufacturer: Textron Marine & Land Systems

Specifications
- Mass: 29,560 lb (13,410 kg)
- Length: 237 inches (6.0 m)
- Width: 101 inches (2.6 m)
- Height: 102 inches (2.6 m)
- Crew: 5
- Armor: IBD Modular Expandable Armor System
- Main armament: 40 mm Mk 19 grenade launcher, .50 caliber M2HB heavy machine gun
- Secondary armament: M240H general-purpose machine gun
- Engine: Cummins 6CTA8.3; 260 hp, 828 foot-pounds
- Transmission: Model MD3560 6-speed Allison Transmission
- Suspension: 4×4 wheeled, fully independent
- Operational range: 475 miles at 50 mph
- Maximum speed: 63 mph (101 km/h)

The M1117 armored security vehicle (ASV; nicknamed Guardian) is an internal security vehicle based on the V-100 and V-150 Commando series of armored cars. It was developed in the late 1990s for service with the United States' Military Police Corps. The first prototypes appeared in February 1997 and serial production of the M1117 commenced between 1999 and early 2000.

The M1117 was one of the first U.S. military vehicles to be built on a specialized mine-resistant hull, and after 2001 was adopted in increasing numbers as a direct response to the threat posed by improvised explosive devices to US forces in Iraq and Afghanistan. Its armament consists of a Mk 19 grenade launcher and M2HB Browning machine gun, mounted in a turret similar to that used on the United States Marine Corps' Amphibious Assault Vehicle, and a M240H Medium Machine Gun mounted outside the gunner's hatch.

The vehicle was utilized by American military police and convoy security units in Iraq and Afghanistan. It is a more heavily protected and heavily armed alternative to the armored M1114 HMMWV aka "Humvee", which was not originally designed to be a protected fighting vehicle.

== History ==
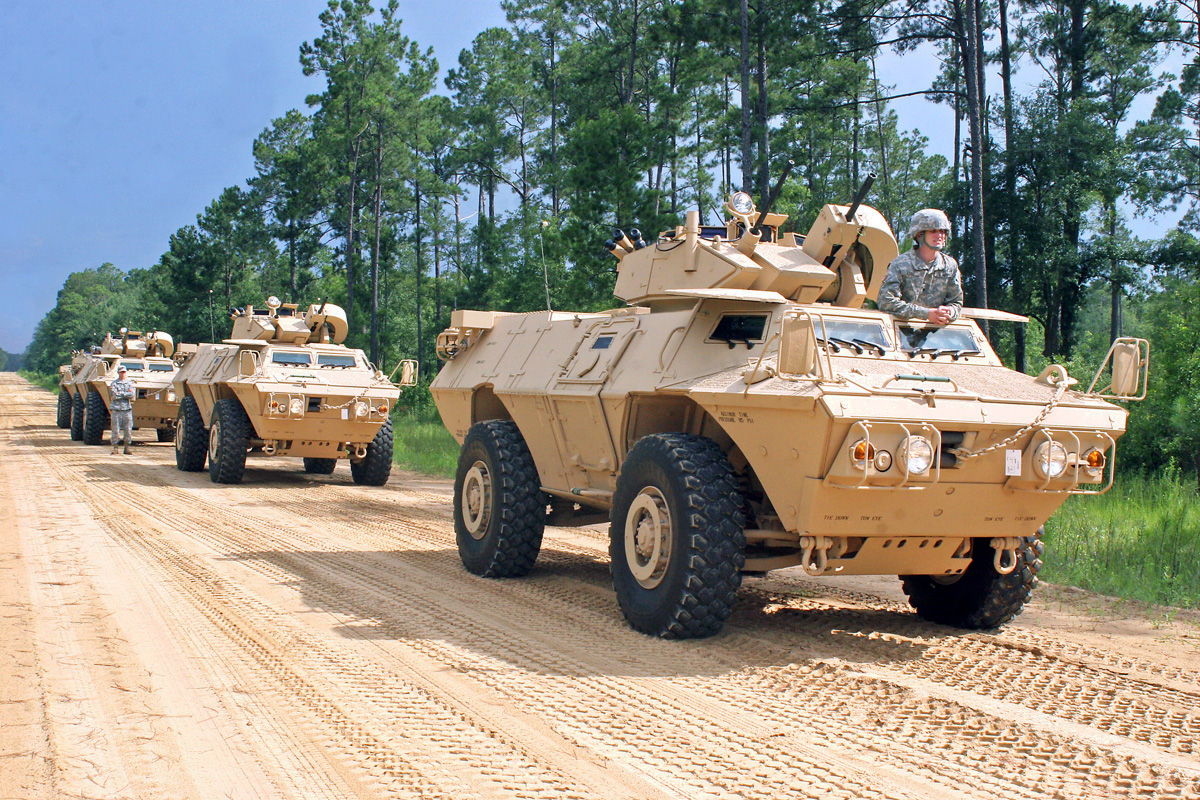
U.S. Army National Guard M1117 armored security vehicles at Fort Stewart, Georgia in June 2010.

The vehicle (originally the ASV-150) is a purpose-built 21st-century version of Cadillac Gage's V-100 Commando family of Armored fighting vehicles which was used by the U.S. Army Military Police during the Vietnam War; whose duties often consisted of providing armed escort for wheeled convoys. The USAF in South Vietnam utilized an open hatched (turret-less) Commando for base security missions. The ASV 150 was a much improved version of the earlier Cadillac Gage vehicle, with improved armor protection and better maneuverability due to the use of Timoney's independent suspension system.

In the 1980s, U.S. military doctrine emphasized two distinct types of equipment. Tanks and infantry fighting vehicles were for frontline combat, and unarmored utility vehicles for transport behind the lines. In 1993, the military had to fight through Mogadishu in unarmored Humvees, leading to the development of up-armored models. Many generals doubted the benefits, but the Military Police Corps, tasked with patrolling the "safe" rear area behind the battle line, insisted that the Army fund a slow but steady production of the bullet-resistant M1114 Humvee.

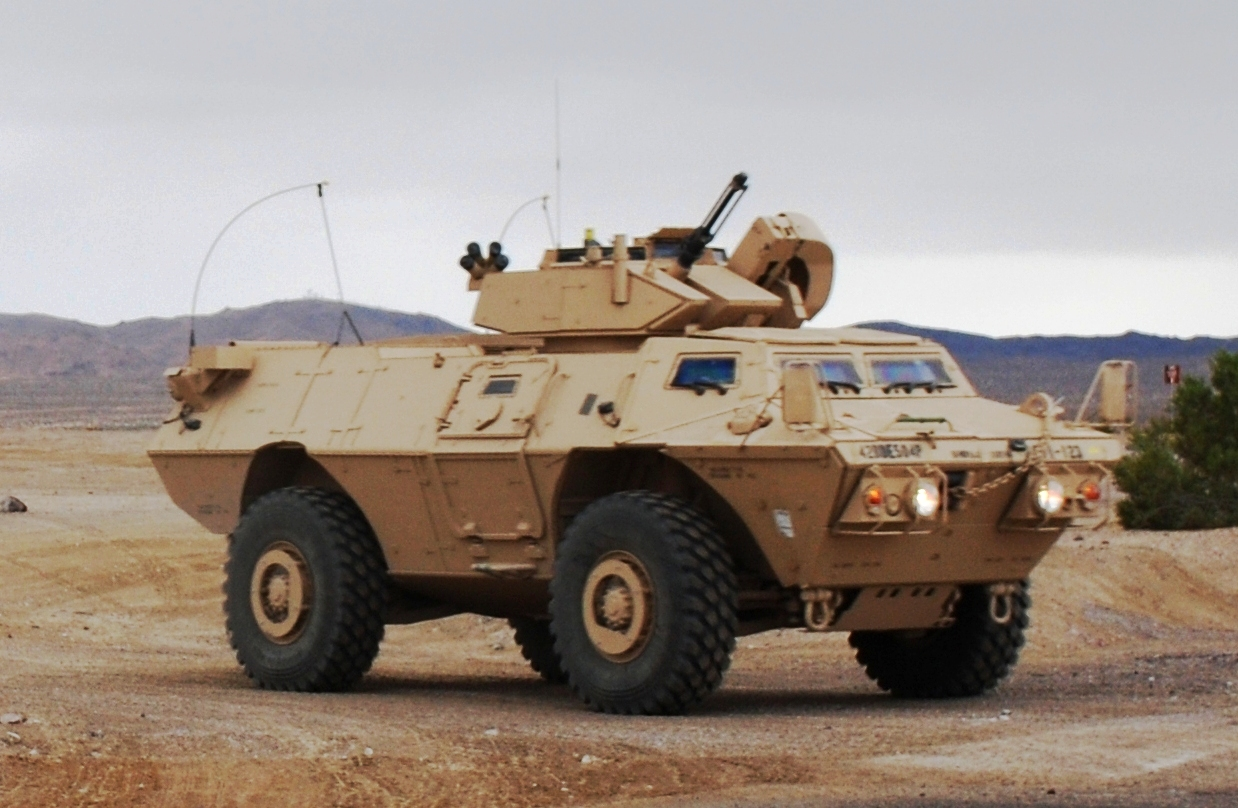
An M1117 at Fort Irwin National Training Center

In 1999, the United States Army began buying a limited number of M1117s for the Military Police Corps. They were field-tested by MP units in Kosovo, mostly by members of the 709th MP Battalion. The program was canceled in 2002 because of budget priorities. The United States Army believed that existing vehicles could be used without an "unacceptable level of risk." (At $800,000 each in 2011, the M1117 was significantly more expensive than the $140,000 price for an M1114 and $220,000 for an armoured M1114.)

When the Iraq War began in 2003, there were 49 ASVs in service, almost all assigned to MP units. The first MP unit to officially use them in a combat zone was the 527th MP Company and other elements of the 720th Military Police Battalion. However, the onset of events in Iraq gave new life to the ASV program as HMMWVs proved vulnerable to attacks and prone to numerous casualties. Up-armored HMMWVs were not designed to be armored cars like the M1117, which are designed to withstand hits from small arms, mines and rockets in front-line combat units. Soldiers who used the M1117s, and some members of Congress visiting Iraq, favored them over other mine-protected vehicles.

In response to urgent United States Army requirements in the mid-2000s, production increased more than forty-fold, from one ASV every three weeks to 56 vehicles per month. The production plant, located in New Orleans, was heavily damaged by Hurricane Katrina in August 2005. The manufacturing facilities were later rebuilt and expanded to five buildings, while the number of personnel at the plant more than doubled. As of mid-2007, 1729 vehicles were delivered or under contract, with many being dispersed not just to MP units, but also to numerous other military units including the Iraqi National Police.

A variant was to be evaluated by the United States Marine Corps as part of the Mine Resistant Ambush Protected (MRAP) vehicle program. In May 2007, after its vehicle submission failed ballistics testing at Aberdeen Proving Ground, Textron received word that it would not receive further orders as part of the MRAP program. However, in early 2008, Textron was awarded a contract worth $228 million to build 329 ASVs, to be delivered with the latest fragmentation protection kits. The total number of ASVs produced and remaining to be delivered to the U.S. Army at the time was 2,058 vehicles.

In 2015, Textron Marine re-branded them as the Commando Family of Vehicles and launched six new variants: Infantry Fighting Vehicle; Reconnaissance; Command and Control; Ambulance; Armored Personnel Carrier; and Support Utility Vehicle.

In April 2019, the M1117 was added to the Master Divestiture List. In time, they will be replaced with the Oshkosh M-ATV.

== Design ==
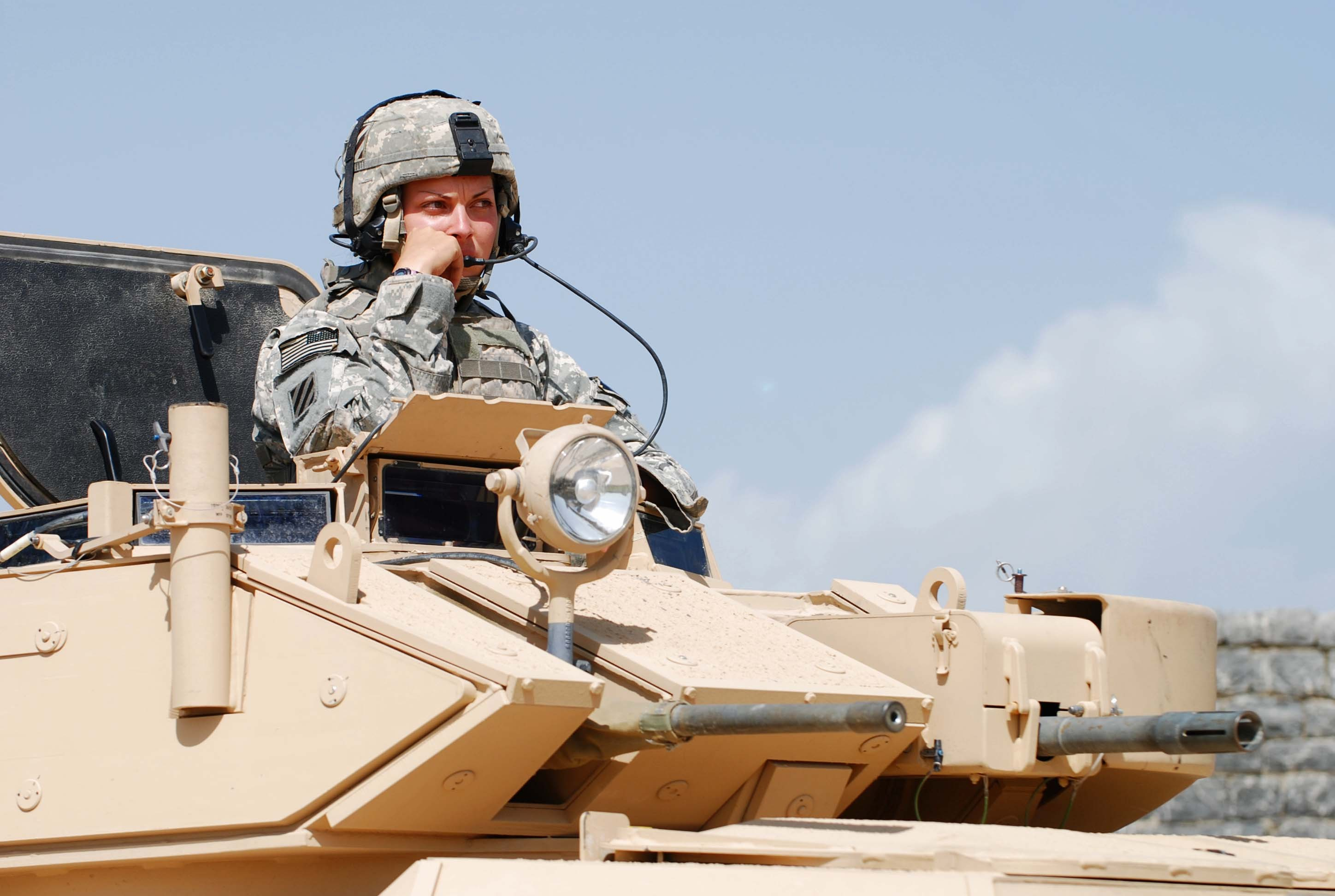
The turret has a .50 caliber M2HB machine gun (left) and Mk 19 grenade launcher (right)

At about 15 tons, the M1117 is lighter than the 20-ton Stryker ICV or 25-ton M2 Bradley armored vehicle. It can reach 20 miles per hour in 7 seconds. It is only 7 feet 9 1/2 inches (2.375 meters) wide, compared to 11 feet 9 1/2 inches (3.594 meters) for a Bradley. Buttoned up, the crew has 360° visibility. In size and capability, it fits between the Humvee and the $5 million Stryker. The crew compartment is fully air-conditioned.

=== Survivability ===
The ASV uses an advanced modular expandable armor package from IBD Deisenroth Engineering, consisting of ceramic composite appliqué on the exterior and spall liner on the interior. The Guardian's armor is designed to defeat small arms fire, mines and Improvised Explosive Devices (IEDs). The armor is angled, presenting no vertical surfaces, and deflects many rocket-propelled grenade (RPG) hits. If an RPG does hit the vehicle directly, the armor can still function, although crew survivability varies with the location of the RPG hit. Angled armor is more resistant to attack than vertical armor due to the V-shaped hull deflecting explosive forces, as opposed to a single-plane hull which takes the entire impact force.

ASVs in Iraq and Afghanistan have withstood several IED attacks, some vehicles multiple times. One ASV returned 28 miles (45 km) after an IED destroyed all four tires. As for chemical and biological attacks, the ASV's gas particulate air filtration system was designed to provide additional protection, but is currently not in service due to lack of crew masks for the system. The ASV has experienced several rollover incidents. Soldiers have a high survivability rate in rollovers as the turret is fully enclosed, protecting the gunner from ejection. However, there have been at least two incidents of rollovers that resulted in fatalities when the turret broke away from the vehicle. Since these incidents, Textron began adding 15 additional bolts to the vehicle turret.

=== Mobility ===
An M1117 navigates through an obstacle at a rough terrain driving course

The typical mission profile of an ASV involves 50% travel on primary roads, 30% travel on secondary roads, and 20% cross-country travel. The vehicle has a model MD3560 Allison Transmission. Front and rear independent suspension provides smooth highway speeds of up to 70 mph (110 km/h), while it is capable of fording 5-foot (1.5 m) depths of water, climbing gradients of 60%, negotiating 30% side slope, and overcoming obstacles of five feet. Its turning radius is 27.5-foot (8.4 m), and it has 18-inch (46 cm) of ground clearance.

Six ASVs can be carried on a single Boeing C-17 Globemaster III airlift aircraft, fully loaded and ready to roll off. Also, the Sikorsky CH-53E Super Stallion helicopter is able to carry one ASV.

== Variants ==
The following variants are known to be in production/service:

- Command & Control
- Recovery Vehicle (Each ASV can flat-tow another ASV or HMMWV)
- Reconnaissance Surveillance & Target Acquisition (RSTA)
- Ambulance
- Infantry Carrier Vehicle (ICV, alternative name for an Armored Personnel Carrier (APC)) – 24 inches longer than ASV, armed with cupola mounting for a machine gun or grenade launcher instead of a turret, carries 3 crew and 8 troops.
- M1200 Armored Knight FiST-V

=== Direct fire support variant ===
With the adoption of the M1117 as the Mobile Strike Force Vehicle (MSFV) by the Afghan National Army, demand increased for much larger-caliber weapon systems mounted on the same chassis, to provide an organic anti-tank and fire support capability. On 22 October 2013, a new fire-support variant of the M1117 was unveiled by Textron at the annual Association of the United States Army (AUSA) exhibition. This model, described as the Commando Select 90 mm Direct Fire Vehicle, was designed with an exceptionally large turret ring and carried a Cockerill Mk III 90 mm low-pressure cannon.

This provided the M1117 with an extremely potent form of firepower for its size and weight class, firing canister, high explosive, high-explosive squash head, and high-explosive anti-tank shells, as well as an armour-piercing discarding sabot round capable of destroying older main battle tanks. One advantage of the low-pressure cannon was that, in spite of its relatively large caliber, it could be mounted on a vehicle weighing only 18 metric tonnes, or about 40,000 pounds, combat loaded. The new armament was also fitted with a single-baffle muzzle brake and concentric hydro-spring recoil mechanism as standard to reduce the pressure exerted on the relatively light chassis.

According to Textron, it invested in the 90 mm Direct Fire Vehicle as a direct response to the Afghan requirement for a more heavily armed MSFV. Afghanistan immediately ordered 50 and offered to purchase the vehicle through the Foreign Military Sales (FMS) program, with grants from the US government. However, since the 90 mm cannon and most of the turret components were made in Belgium, US military officials blocked the sale until they could qualify and approve that particular combination for export through FMS.

In 2014, the procurement process was suspended when the US canceled its funding for the sale of almost 300 MSFVs, including the 50 Direct Fire Vehicles, to the Afghan National Army, citing budgetary constraints. The US military had not yet finished its testing of the Belgian weapons system at the time, so none were ever delivered. As Kabul's requirement for a fire support variant of the MSFV remained unfulfilled, Textron agreed to revisit the potential sale with Afghan officials in 2017.

Around the same time, Iraq requested an undisclosed number of 90 mm Direct Fire Vehicles from Textron for its ongoing campaign against the Islamic State of Iraq and the Levant. The sale was pending review by the US government in February 2017.

=== Textron Tactical Armoured Patrol Vehicle ===
The Textron Tactical Armoured Patrol Vehicle (TAPV) used by the Canadian Army is a heavy-armoured upgrade of the M1117. 500 are in service.

=== Foreign variants ===
Bulgaria uses a variant of the M1117 APC fitted with a NSVT heavy machine gun instead of the M2. Not all vehicles have been converted this way.

The Iraqi armored personnel carrier ASV variant is configured for transport. Iraq has also modified some of its ASV turrets to accommodate an anti-aircraft capability.

== Operators ==
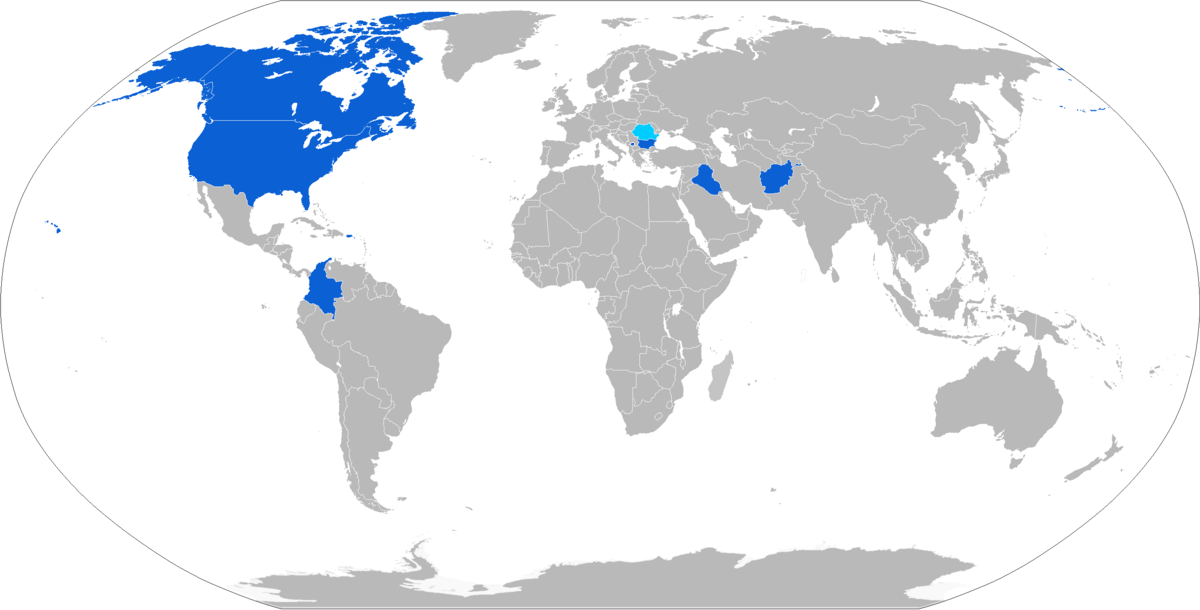
A map showing Textron M1117 operators in blue, with locally produced operators in light blue

=== Current operators ===
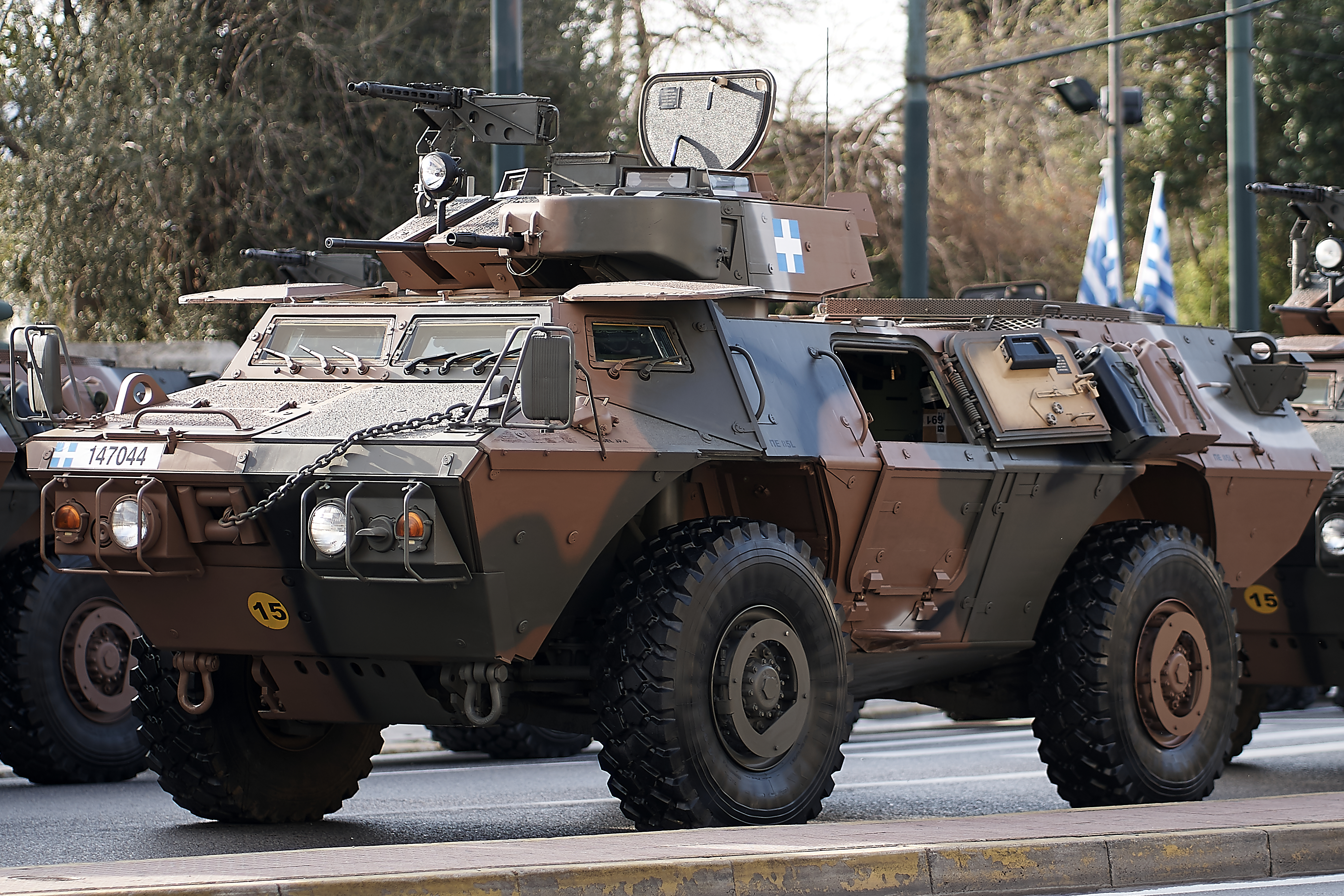
A Greek M1117 in service

- Afghanistan: An high number of M1117s have been captured by the Taliban as part of their 2021 offensive.
- Bulgaria: 17 in service. General Defence Staff of Bulgaria had put a requirement for an additional 30 units to the Parliament in 2008; only 10 were delivered in addition to 7 already present.
- Canada: 500 in service (a larger and heavier Canadian variant known as the Textron Tactical Armoured Patrol Vehicle).
- Colombia: 39 initially, used by the Army. These vehicles are the Infantry Carrier Vehicle version, purchased to supplement Colombia's recently acquired fleet of BTR-80s; another 39 were expected to enter operational service in 2012. In August 2013, Textron was awarded a $31.6 million contract for 28 Commando APCs with remote turrets. Deliveries were scheduled to begin in November 2013 and be completed by April 2014. On 4 April 2016, the United States Department of Defence revealed that Colombia had acquired 54 new M1117 APCs. In August 2020, a donation of 200 vehicles was approved under the Excess Defense Article (EDA) program. As of February 2026, 145 vehicles had been delivered.
- Greece: 1,202 delivered, part of US military support, EDA program.
- Iraq: 264 in service (60 more were ordered in April 2016) used by Iraqi National Police units. Some captured by ISIL fighters in 2014.
- Kenya: In May 2024, the White House announced that the Kenyan military will receive 150 M1117s by September 2024, taken from EDA stocks. Vehicles reported delivered in August 2025.
- Kosovo: Over 105 M1117s are currently in service in the KSF. The USA has donated a number of vehicles, and more have been purchased by the Kosovo government.
- Kurdistan Region
- Morocco: 597 as of October 2025.
- Pakistan: Estimated 400 in service (Canadian variant Textron Tactical Armoured Patrol Vehicle).
- United States: 1,175 as of January 2025. The vehicle is primarily used by U.S. Army military police units.Expected to be phased out and replaced by Oshkosh M-ATVs.
- Ukraine: Entered service in March 2024.

=== Former operators ===
- Islamic Republic of Afghanistan: 634 (55 more were ordered) 255 Mobile Strike Force Vehicles ordered for the Afghan National Army.

=== Non-state actors ===
- Islamic State
- People's Defense Units

== See also ==
- Cadillac Gage Commando – (United States)
- Dragoon AFV – (United States) – a vehicle produced by Arrowpointe Corporation (now General Dynamics Land Division).
- Bravia Chaimite – (Portugal)
- BOV M11 – (Serbia)
- BOV M16 Milos – (Serbia)
- TAPV – (Canada)
- Véhicule de l'Avant Blindé – (France)
- ZFB-05 – (China)
- BRDM-2 – (Soviet Union)
