= IBD Deisenroth Engineering =

IBD Deisenroth Engineering GmbH
- Company type: GmbH
- Founded: 1981
- Defunct: 2019
- Fate: complete takeover by Rheinmetall
- Headquarters: Lohmar, Germany
- Key people: Friedrich Ulf Deisenroth (deceased)
- Revenue: 85 Mio. € (2018)
- Number of employees: 130

IBD Deisenroth Engineering (de: BD Ingenieurbüro Deisenroth or 'IBD') was a German company specializing in the design, development, and production of protection systems and armor for military vehicles. They formed in 1981 to develop applications of a new explosive suitable for use in explosive reactive armor (ERA). Through the 1980s, they developed many individual applications for the Bundeswehr. In 1994, they introduced their MEXAS armor systems using ceramic armor which were very popular as upgrade systems for a wide range of armored vehicles, mostly in NATO. MEXAS was replaced by AMAP in 2006, which includes a wide variety of modular armor, both active and passive.

The company started a production arm in 1991, Chempro. Chempro was purchased by Rheinmetall in 2007 and merged it with their existing ammunition division to form Rheinmetall Chempro. The two companies formed ADS Protection the same year to produce an active armor system ("hard kill"). On 1 June 2019, Rheinmetall purchased most remaining assets of IBD Deisenroth and formed Rheinmetall Protection Systems GmbH.

== History ==
Ingenieurbüro Deisenroth was established in 1981 as an engineering and development office, focusing initially on developing a new explosive for reactive armor. Between 1981 and 1989, the firm undertook contract developments for the German Armed Forces, specifically for the Federal Office of Defence Technology and Procurement (BWB).

In 1991, Chempro was founded as a production entity to complement Ingenieurbüro Deisenroth's development work. Since early 2007, Rheinmetall Defence has held a 51% stake in Chempro, now operating as Rheinmetall Chempro GmbH under the Rheinmetall Waffe Munition division.

MEXAS protection technology was launched in 1994, with further developments between 2000 and 2006 leading to the creation of the AMAP product family, designed to meet the NATO standard 4569 or AEP 55. To enhance product marketing and customer proximity, several subsidiaries were established: EODC in Canada (2001), EODH in Greece (2003), and AST in France (2004). Additionally, the Swedish company Åkers Krutbruk Protection AB was acquired in 2003.

In 2007, IBD Deisenroth and Rheinmetall Defence jointly founded ADS Gesellschaft für aktive Schutzsysteme mbH (ADS Protection) to advance active vehicle protection technology, specifically through the "AMAP-ADS" hard-kill system, which employs distance-active protective measures. Initially, IBD held 75% of the company’s shares, with Rheinmetall holding 25%. By early 2011, Rheinmetall had increased its ownership stake to 74%.

== Products ==
The company developed two main products focused on enhancing both passive and active safety for armored vehicles:

MEXAS (Modular Expandable Armour System): A passive protection system well-suited for retrofitting existing vehicles. MEXAS has been implemented on platforms like the Leopard 2 tank, ATF Dingo, ASCOD, and the Panzerhaubitze 2000.

AMAP (Advanced Modular Armour Protection): A modular protection system combining passive and active safety measures across multiple layers. AMAP utilizes ceramic nanoparticles, providing lightweight yet durable armor. It has been installed on the CV90 infantry fighting vehicle and the Patria AMV, and it is planned for use on the new German Puma infantry fighting vehicle.
