= Advanced Modular Armor Protection =

German modular composite armor

Advanced Modular Armor Protection (AMAP) is modular composite armour concept, developed by the German company IBD Deisenroth Engineering, since 2019 part of Rheinmetall Protection Systems. According to IBD AMAP is a 4th generation composite armour, making use of nano-ceramics and modern steel alloy technologies. AMAP is the successor of MEXAS.

Part of the Advanced Modular Armor Protection concept is to combine different parts of the AMAP product family to create a protection solution custom-tailored to the end user's need, such as e.g. all-around protection.

The Polish company Rosomak S.A, part of Polska Grupa Zbrojeniowa, has been producing AMAP armour for use in the turret add-on modules of Leopard 2PL under license.

== Design ==
The Advanced Modular Armor Protection branding is used for a variety of armour systems designed by IBD Deisenroth, including ceramic armour, laminated armour, light metal armour, spaced armour and reactive armour. Lightweight slat armor is also part of the AMAP family.

In order to achieve a high protection at a low weight, AMAP is making used of highly specialized composite materials, light metal alloys such as aluminium-titanium alloys, improved steel alloys and nano-ceramics.

AMAP is a modular protection concept, including numerous versions that can be combined to reach the desired level of protection.

In 2009, IBD stated that it had developed a new high-hardened steel requiring 30% less thickness to offer the same protection level as ARMOX 500Z high hard armour steel. Mat 7720 new, a newly developed aluminium-titanium alloy, requires only 38% as much weight as rolled homogeneous armour (RHA) for reaching the same level of protection compared to older titanium alloys requiring 58% of the steel's weight. Compared to RHA, the Mat 7720 new alloy provides twice as much protection for a given weight.

In 2013, IBD introduced nano-metric steel, high-strength nitrogen steels developed in cooperation with steel manufacturers. Nano-metric steel almost matches the protection provided by standard ceramic materials. An improved liner material for the IBD C1 HT spall liner was also presented, offering a 20% gain in performance for a given weight over standard liners and a 10% gain in performance over IBD's previous liner offerings. A combination of the different available protection materials can result in weight savings of over 40%.

IBD also developed nano-composite liner materials suited for structural parts such as wheelhouses, fenders and inner decoupled floors of mine protected vehicles. Known as IBD FlexiComp, these materials offer improved ballistic protection and structural strength compared to older liner materials; the elastic properties are twice as high while having a 10% lower density.

Some armour arrays sold under the AMAP brand are making use of nano-ceramics, which are harder and lighter than current ceramics, while having better multi-hit capability. Normal ceramic tiles and a liner backing have a mass-efficiency (E_{M}) value of 3 compared to normal steel armour, while it fulfills STANAG 4569. The new nano-crystalline ceramic materials should increase the hardness compared to current ceramics by 70% and the weight reduction is 30%, therefore the E_{M} value is larger than 4. Furthermore, the higher fracture toughness increases the general multi-hit capability.

Some AMAP armour modules might consist of nano-ceramic tiles glued onto a backing liner and overlaid by a cover, a concept which is also used by MEXAS.

In excess new nano-ceramic armour overlaying a vehicle's base armour, which is backed up by a spall-liner, can achieve a weight reduction of more than 40% to meet the Level 3 of STANAG 4569. Furthermore, AMAP's glue and lining components work efficiently even at high temperatures (like 80 °C (176 °F)).

== History ==
In 2015, IBD was selected to provide light weight protection solutions for Kongsbergs Protector RWS family.

At Eurosatory 2016, IBD Deisenroth showcased a protection solution suited for complex shapes such as wheelhouses and sponsons based on homogenous composite parts. Additionally, three-dimensional structural shapes made from ceramic armour were presented, offering protection in accordance with STANAG 4569 Level 5 and 6, and against EFP and IED threats.

== AMAP product family ==
=== AMAP-ADS ===
The Active Defense System was originally developed under the name AMAP-ADS by ADS Gesellschaft für aktive Schutzsysteme mbH, a joint venture of IBD Deisenroth and Rheinmetall. After the latter purchased the majority stake in ADS Gesellschaft für aktive Schutzsysteme in 2012, the AMAP moniker was dropped.

The ADS is a hardkill active protection system, designed to prevent a vehicle from being hit by a ballistic threat by destroying it mid-air. The system was also marketed under the name AAC in Sweden and under the name Shark in France. It is one of the fastest active protection systems; in contrast to millisecond systems like Raytheon's Quick Kill or IMI's Iron Fist it is a microsecond system, needing only microseconds to react. This reduces the minimum defeat distance and enables protection against more different threats like RPGs or EFPs. Sensors for target detection and countermeasures are installed all around the vehicle. The system weight is 140 kilograms (310 lb) for light vehicles and up to 500 kilograms (1,100 lb) for heavy vehicles.

=== AMAP-AIR ===
AMAP-AIR is a lightweight armour solution designed to protect aircraft and helicopters. It is fitted to the German Eurocopter Tiger, providing protection from below and along the flanks. While IBD didn't release any information regarding the achieved protection level, OCCAR revealed that the Tiger is designed with protection against 23 mm ammunition.

=== AMAP-B ===
AMAP-B (ballistic) provides protection against kinetic energy penetrators such as bullets, autocannon calibers such as 20 mm to 30 mm, and against APFSDS of tank guns like modern 120 mm or 125 mm rounds. Like MEXAS, AMAP-B exists in three versions. Light offers protection against small arms for light armoured or soft-skinned vehicles, helicopters, aircraft and boats. The medium version of AMAP-B is normally used on medium armoured vehicles such as the IFVs and APCs. These vehicles normally need protection against autocannons up to 30 mm caliber. The heavy AMAP-B version is for use on tanks.

=== AMAP-EL ===
AMAP-EL is a type of electric reactive armour developed by Rheinmetall and IBD. It was in development by 2018. It uses capacitors to store energy; when the outer layer of the armour is penetrated, the capacitors release the energy, pushing the outer armour layer(s) away. This causes the projectile to deflect. AMAP-EL is claimed to have an extremely quick reaction time. Due to not featuring explosive materials, the possibility of collateral damage is reduced compared to conventional ERA.

=== AMAP-IED ===
AMAP-IED is designed for the protection of the underbelly and lower hull sides against improvised explosive devices. IED strikes have caused high losses to troops in Afghanistan and Iraq. Like other AMAP protection solutions. AMAP-IED is offered in multi-level concept: the baseline configuration (level 1) is designed to provide protection against explosive blasts, warhead fragmentation and spall from artillery shells, roadside bombs and KE threats. It consists of ceramic armour tiles and spall liners. The baseline armour can be supplemented by a further armour module (level 2) for horizontal protection against EFPs and rocket-propelled grenades like the RPG-7.

=== AMAP-L ===
Spalling of an aluminium plate

AMAP-L (liner) is the spall liner of AMAP. AMAP-L can be attached to soft-skinned or armoured vehicles. The spall cone which is normally 87° can be reduced to only 17°. Over 30,000 vehicles have been fitted with spall lining systems of IBD.

=== AMAP-M ===
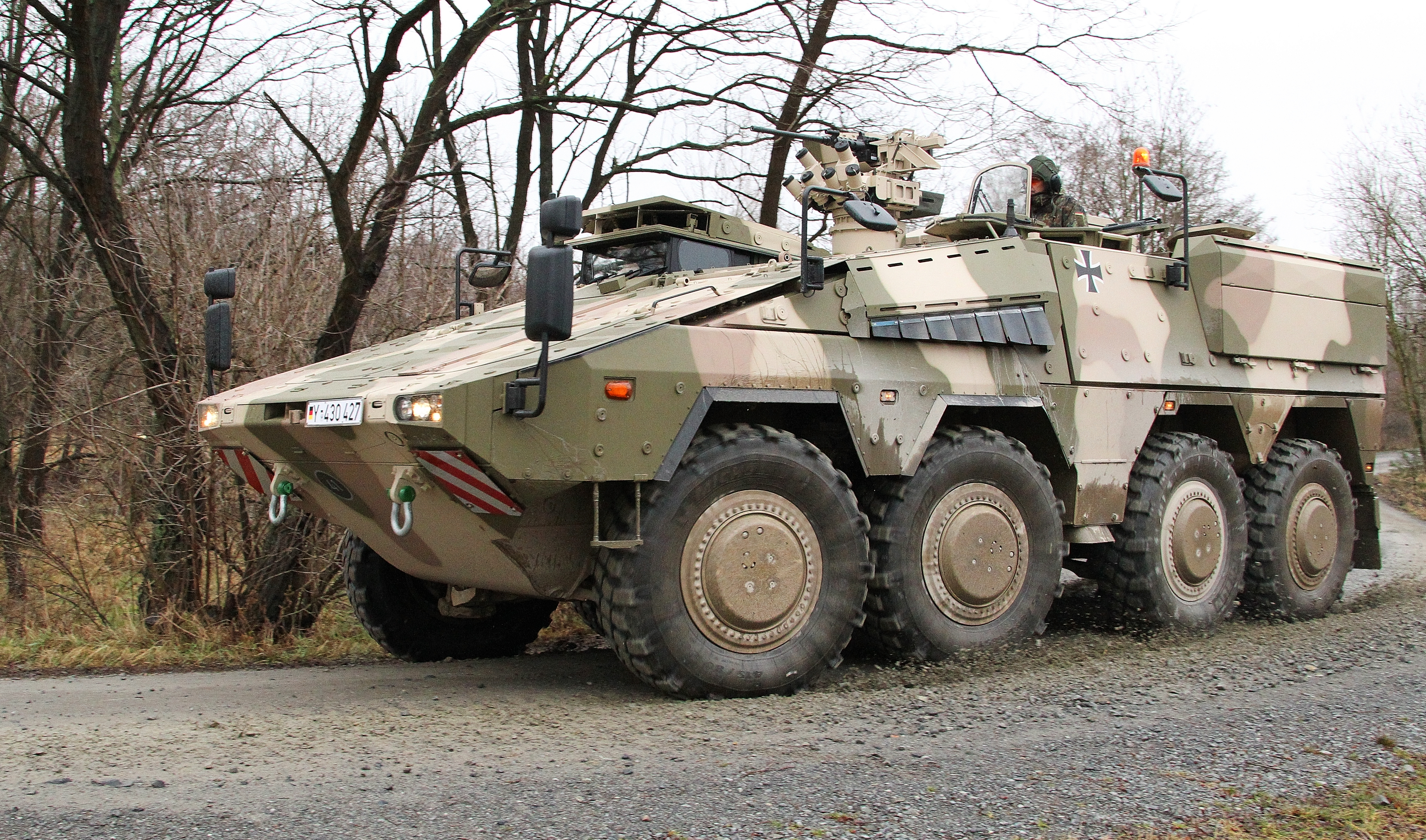
The Boxer is fitted with the AMAP-M mine protection system

Under the brand AMAP-M (mine), IBD has been offering mine protection solutions in accordance with different levels of STANAG 4569. The range of offered mine protection kits includes systems for light trucks and the heaviest main battle tanks. Depending on the configuration, the AMAP-M can protect against blast mines, fragmentation and projectile-generating mines, or a combination of these. The vehicle's structure is used as an integral part of the AMAP-M kit, to which an add-on module can be attached.

=== AMAP-MPS ===
AMAP-MPS (multi purpose seat) is a special blast-protected seat. Contrary to normal seats, it is not attached to the vehicle floor or roof, so shock-energy can be absorbed by the seats.

=== AMAP-P ===
AMAP-P consists of lightweight panels mounted with a distance from the vehicle's base armour, similar to side skirts or slat armour. The panels can be folded flush against the base armour when not in use. The panels are able to destroy or short-circuit the fuze of the warhead of rocket propelled grenades, preventing the formation of the shaped charge jet. AMAP-P offers multi-hit capability and an areal density lower than 15 kilograms per square metre (3.1 lb/sq ft).

=== AMAP-R ===
AMAP-R (roof) is designed to protect the roof of a vehicle against artillery bomblets and EFPs. AMAP-R consists of up two armour layers, called AMAP-R Level 1 and AMAP-R Level 2 that can be installed on top of the existing roof armour. Level 1 provides protection against bomblets, while Level 2 protects against EFPs. It can also protect against the RKG-3 anti-tank grenade.

Compared to conventional roof protection, which can have an aerial density of up to 450 kilograms per square metre (92 lb/sq ft), AMAP-R is supposedly significantly lighter with Level 1 having an aerial density of only about 25 kilograms per square metre (5.1 lb/sq ft), which increases to 120 kilograms per square metre (25 lb/sq ft) according to the manufacturer when both AMAP-R Level 1 and Level 2 are used together.

=== AMAP-S ===
AMAP-S (stealth) is IBD's solution of reducing vehicle signature. AMAP-S can be fitted to naval vessels, like ships, ground vehicles and aircraft. The facility of IBD has own instruments to measure the signatures of a vehicle.

=== AMAP-SC ===
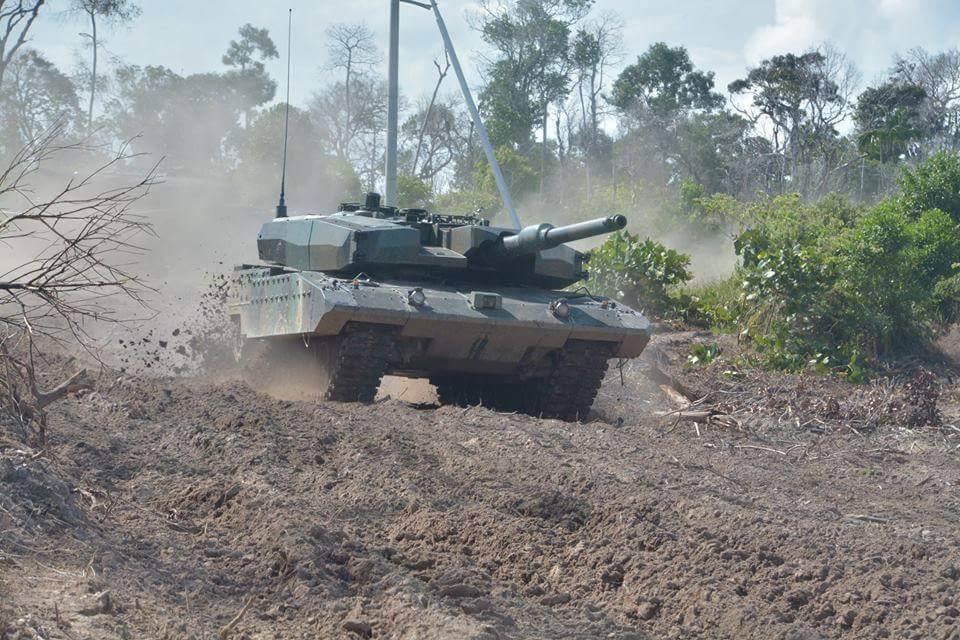
The Leopard 2RI's add-on armour contains AMAP-SC elements

AMAP-SC (shaped charge) is a passive armour system designed to defeat weapons with a shaped charge warheads such as ATGMs, RPGs and HEAT rounds. It is offers a very high mass-efficiency, according to the manufacturer the E_{M} is between 8 and 10, meaning that per weight AMAP-SC offers 8 to 10 times as much protection as steel armour. While being optimized for use against shaped charge weapons, it also provides some protection against other threats including IEDs. In contrast to explosive reactive armour, AMAP-SC reduces the potential for collateral damage due to utilizing explosive materials.

AMAP-SC is used on the Puma IFV and some Leopard 2 upgrades. The Leopard 2 Evolution with AMAP-SC is protected even against heavy handheld anti-tank weapons such as the RPG-27, RPG-29 and RPG-30

=== AMAP-T ===
AMAP-T (transparency) is the armour glass component of AMAP. The use of modern ceramic armour reduces the weight by up to 50% compared to normal bulletproof glass of the same protection level. It is offered with protection levels ranging from STANAG 4569 1 to 4.

In 2019, IBD Deisenroth presented an improved transparent ceramic solution based on IBD's NANOTech ceramics, offering comparable protection to opaque ceramic armour. Compared to armour glass, the transparent ceramic armour can reduce the weight by about 70%. The mosaic ceramic tiles are backed with natural nano-fibre laminates with high energy absorption.

=== AMAP-X ===
AMAP-X is a protection system against threats typically found in urban environments.

== Applications ==
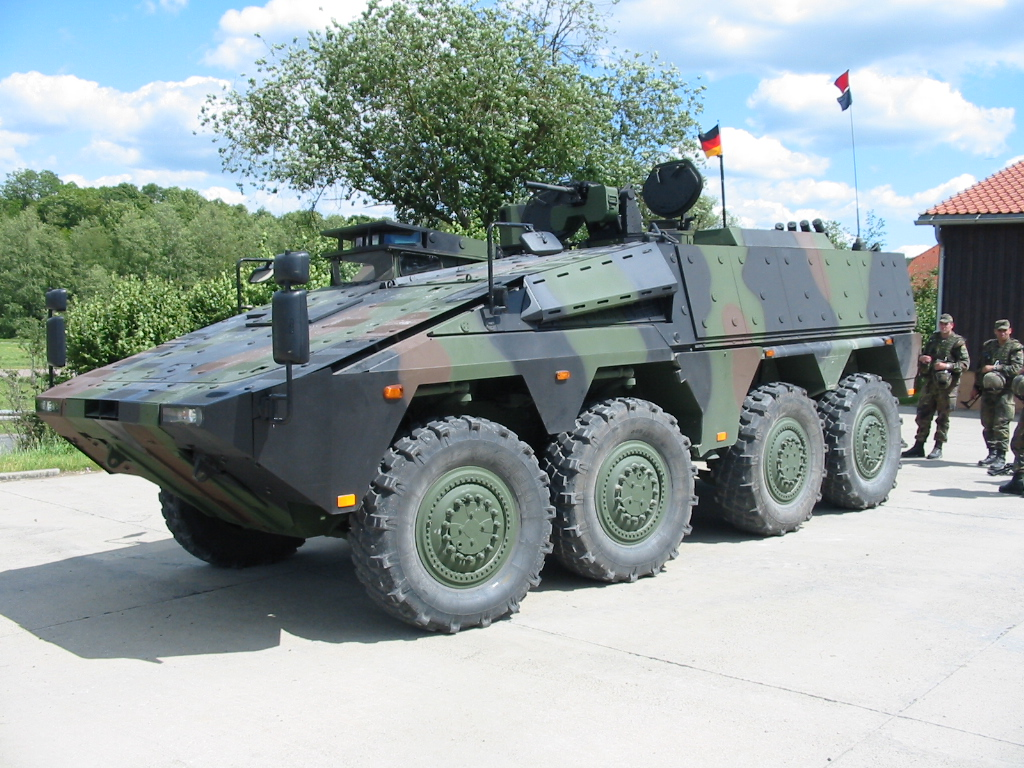
The MRAV Boxer is armoured with AMAP composite armour.

Some of the known applications for AMAP include following armoured vehicles:

=== Light and medium vehicles ===
- Armoured Multi-Purpose Vehicle
- Combat Vehicle 90: AMAP-M, only some variants. Norwegian CV90s have been upgraded with a new protection suite developed by IBD and Rheinmetall Chempro.
- Freccia IFV
- Iveco LMV: AMAP-B, AMAP-L, AMAP-M, AMAP-IED and AMAP-T
- Iveco/KMW MPV
- MRAV Boxer: AMAP-B, AMAP-L, AMAP-M and AMAP-IED
- Patria AMV: Croatian and Finish AMVs are fitted with AMAP-B
- Pandur EVO
- Puma: AMAP-B and AMAP-SC
- Rosomak-L: the Rosomak-L uses AMAP for ballistic protection
- VAB: IBD has received an order to equip this vehicle type with a new mine-protection
- Zetor Gerlach

The active protection system AMAP-ADS have already been tested on several vehicles including the SPz Marder, SEP, CV90120, AMV 8x8 and LMV.

=== Heavy vehicles ===
In 2007, IBD introduced the MBT Evolution concept, which is an extensive add-on armour kit for the Leopard 2A4 tank. It features AMAP-B, AMAP-IED, AMAP-L, AMAP-M and AMAP-R solutions to provide all-around protection against handheld anti-tank weapons, EFP-IEDs and mines, while the frontal armour is up-armoured to defend against anti-tank guided missiles and large caliber APFSDS ammunition. The AMAP-ADS was advertised as optional part of the MBT Evolution concept, shown on infographics but not fitted to the sole prototype. Parts of the modular MBT Evolution concept were adopted on the Leopard 2SG of the Singapore Army, the Leopard 2RI of the Indonesian Army and the Leopard 2PL of the Polish Army.

In 2012, the MBT Evolution II concept was developed by IBD, which offers improved protection in tank versus tank combat compared to its predecessor. While the earlier MBT Evolution concept was only compatible with the Leopard 2A4 model, the MBT Evolution II concept can also be applied to the Leopard 2A5 and newer models. It was showcased on a modified Stridsvagn 122 tank, which received the unofficial designation Strv 122B+ Evolution. By replacing the existing add-on armour with AMAP and by utilizing a newly developed type of slat armour for the turret bustle, the Strv 122B+ Evolution provides significantly higher all-around and mine protection than a Stridsvagn 122 while being only 350 kilograms (770 lb) heavier.

The MBT Evolution II concept was succeeded by the MBT ESPACE concept using newer IBD PROTech armour rather than AMAP.

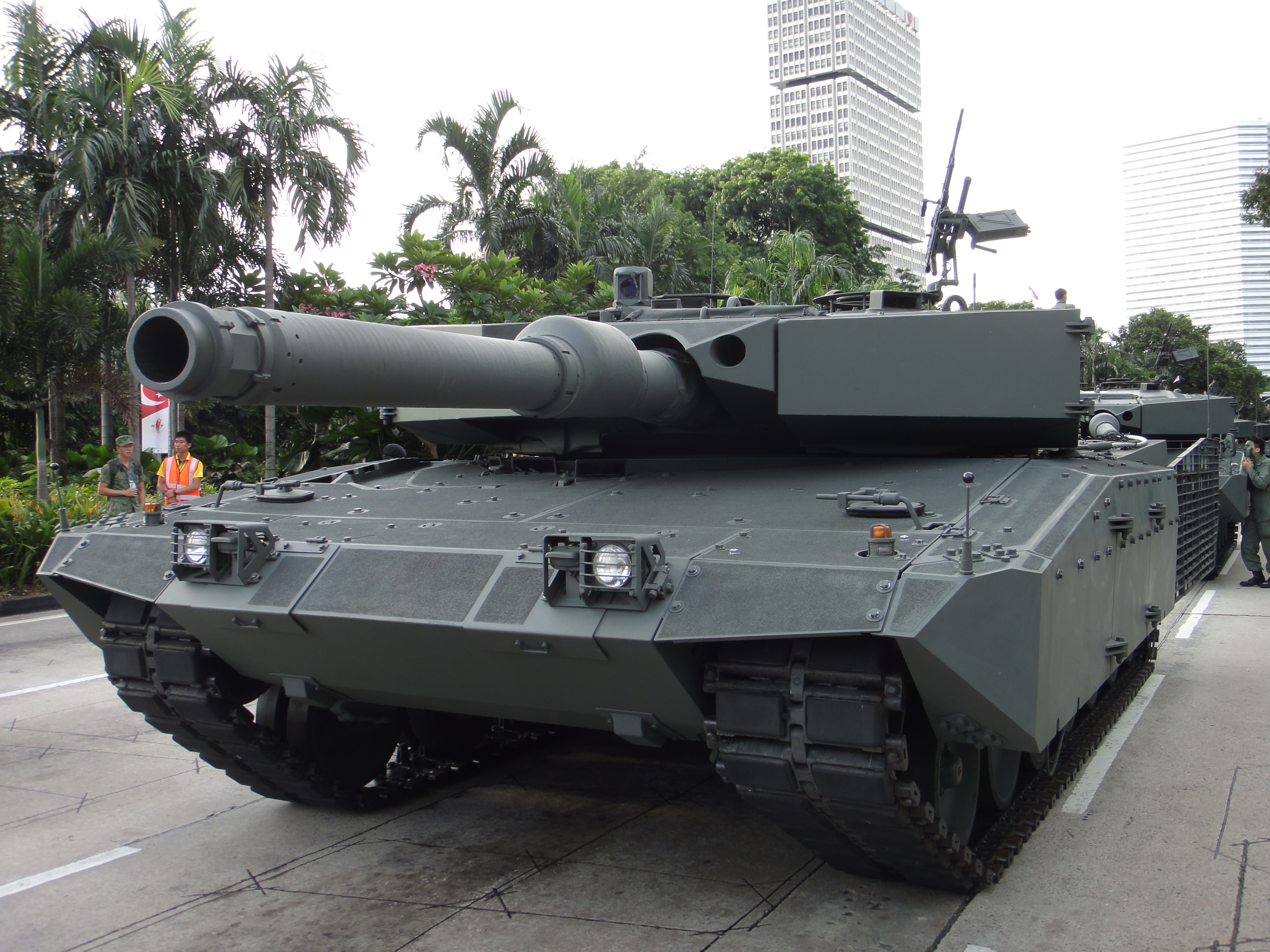
The Leopard 2SG is fitted with AMAP for greater all-around protection, but doesn't feature the full frontal armour kit

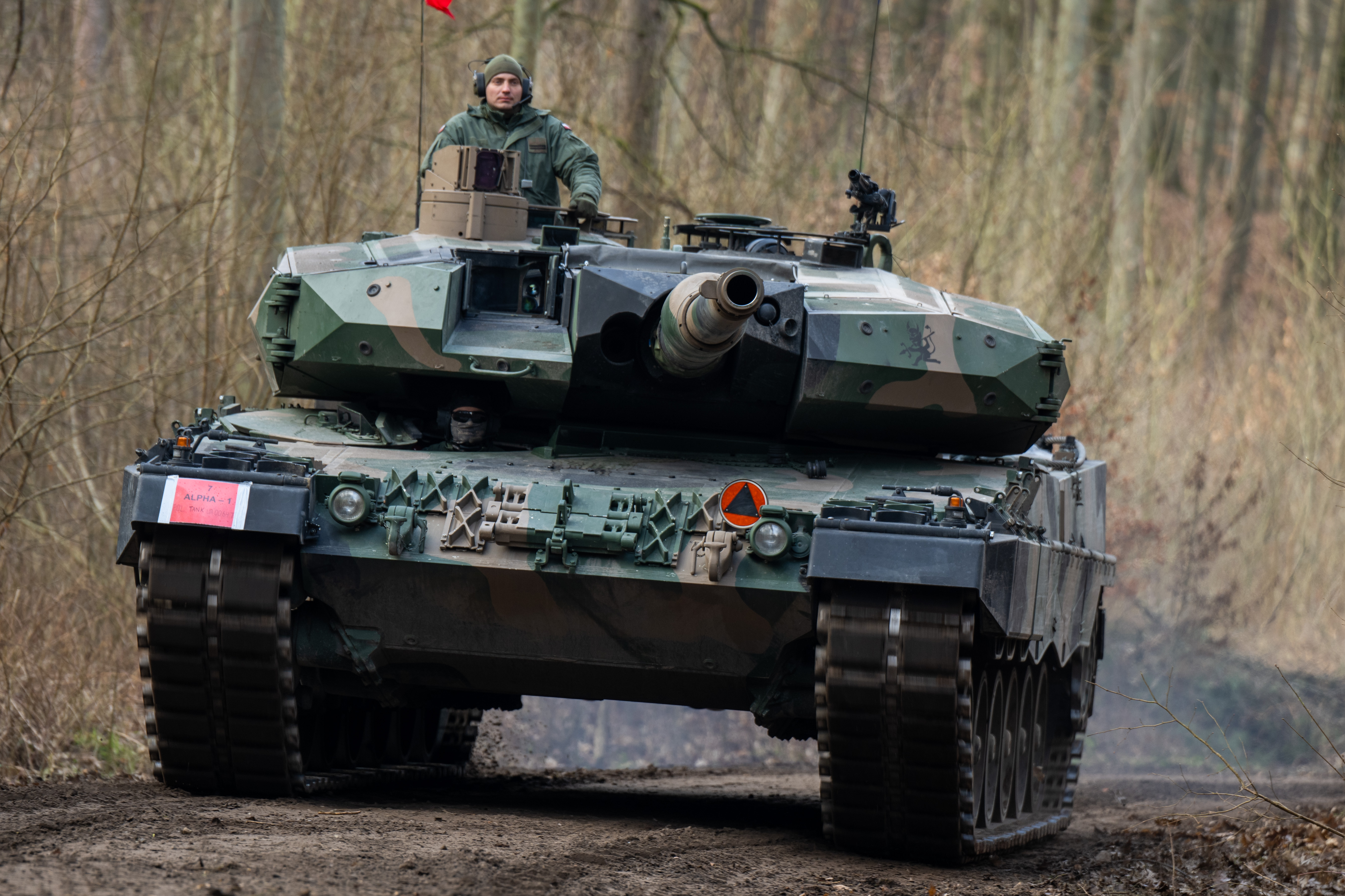
Only the turret of the Leopard 2PL is protected by AMAP armour

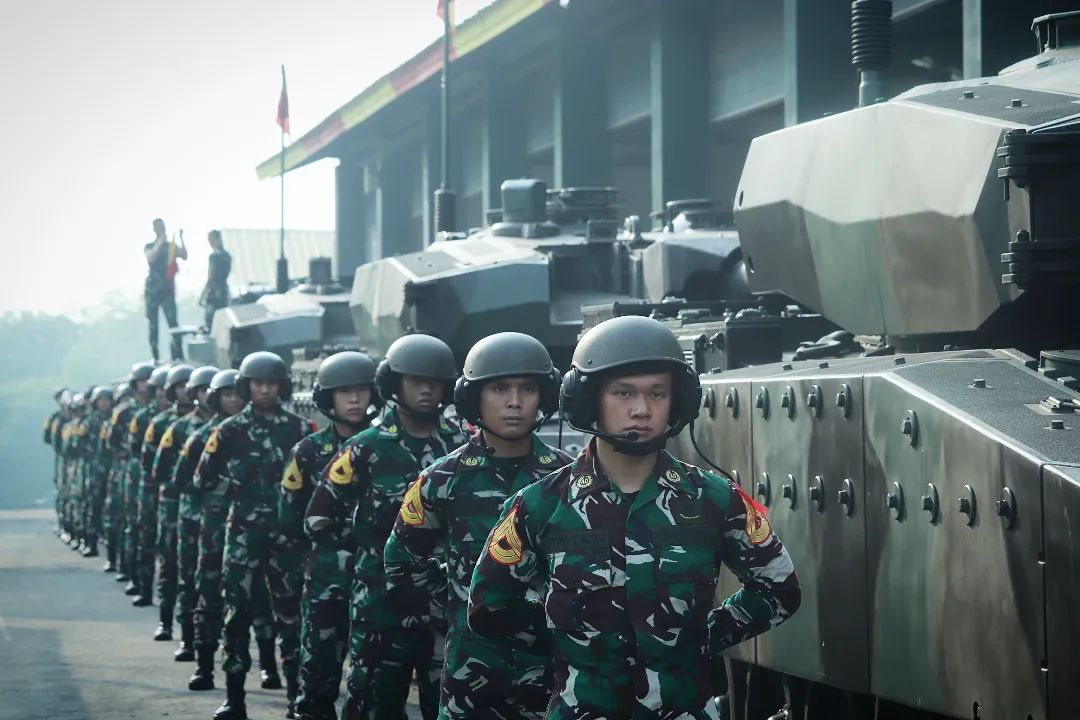
The Leopard 2RI features the full turret armour and hull armour, but lacks the AMAP-M mine protection and AMAP-R roof protection

=== Aircraft ===
- Eurocopter Tiger: AMAP-AIR only
