= MEXAS =

German composite armour system

The Modular Expandable Armor System (MEXAS) is a composite armour system developed by the German company IBD Deisenroth Engineering. MEXAS was introduced in 1994 and has been applied on over 20,000 combat vehicles worldwide. The successor of MEXAS is the Advanced Modular Armor Protection (AMAP).

== Design ==
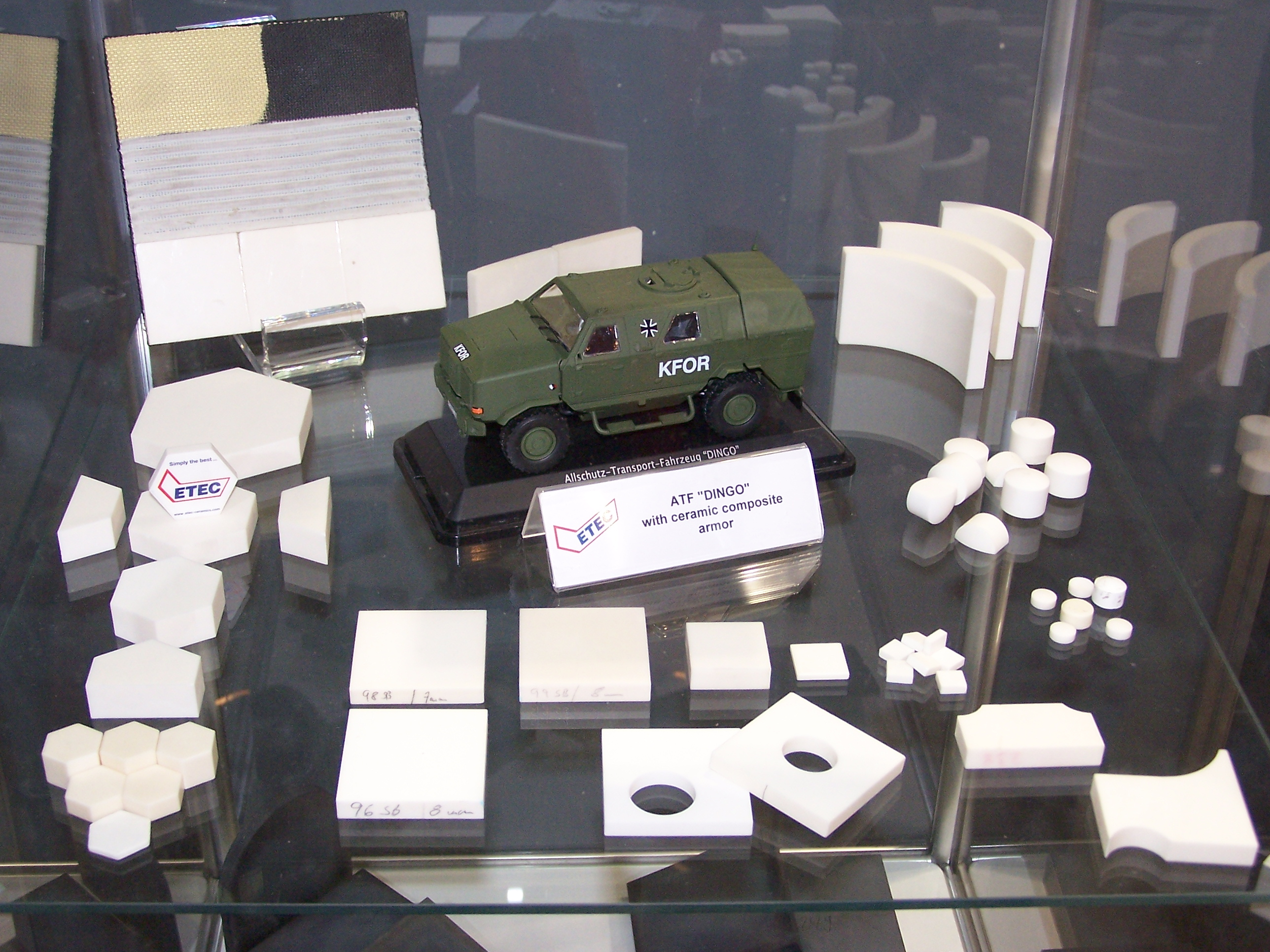
Ceramic armour tiles of MEXAS

The Modular Expandable Armor System (MEXAS) was developed in the early 1990s by IBD Deisenroth and first used in 1994. In 2005 it was succeeded by the next-generation AMAP armour system, which provides a wider variety of different armour options.

MEXAS has been marketed in three versions: MEXAS-L (light) offers protection against small-calibre rounds and can also be fitted on soft-skinned vehicles like MAN military trucks. MEXAS-M (medium) protects the vehicle against autocannon and RPGs with HEAT warheads. MEXAS-H is for use on heavy vehicles like main battle tanks. Depending on version and required protection level MEXAS can protect against kinetic energy penetrators like 30 mm AP, RPGs and mines like the TM-46 mine and TMRP-6 In order to reach different types of desired armour protection MEXAS is either passive armour or non-explosive reactive armour. The exact composition of MEXAS is classified, but according to drawings from the manufacturer the passive version of MEXAS consist of a splinter foil-like specialized Nylon covering a layer of ceramic tiles (possibly materials like aluminium oxide, silicon carbide and boron carbide depending on the user's requirements). Behind the ceramic tiles a layer of aramid backing (e.g. kevlar) is installed. MEXAS also includes spall-liner and depending on the user's requirements a mine-protection kit. The reactive armour version of MEXAS utilizes several spaced multilayer plates consisting of an inert interlayer sandwiched between metal plates. During penetratíon by a shaped charge jet, the sandwich bulges similar to explosive reactive armour (ERA) due to the interlayer absorbing the jet momentum and spreading it radially. Such armour provides better coverage than ERA (up to 85–95% of the surface compared to 30–60%), can be mounted on vehicles with very limited base armour that would not sustain the blast of an ERA tile without damage and has a lower life-cycle cost. MEXAS is only used as adaptable applique armour and is usually not the only protection of a vehicle, but overlaid on the vehicle hull made of ballistic aluminium or armour steel.

During the development of Bionix AFV MEXAS composite armour was adapted to the vehicle. To meet the required protection against heavy machine gun ammunition fired from a distance of 50 metres (160 ft), different options were compared by IBD and ST Kinetics. A 30 millimetres (1.2 in) thick plate of high-hardness armour (HHA) steel provides enough protection. This was indexed as reference to calculate the mass efficiency and thickness efficiency of different armour solutions. Utilizing only 23 millimetres (0.91 in) HHA together with a 10 millimetres (0.39 in) liner to absorb the fragments, the mass efficiency can be increased to 1.2 (the armour provides 1.2 times as much protection as HHA of the same weight). Using a 22 millimetres (0.87 in) MEXAS armour panel on top of 7.3 millimetres (0.29 in) HHA boosts the mass efficiency to 2.5 compared to the HHA reference. The best result was achieved by utilizing a 20 millimetres (0.79 in) thick MEXAS armour panel on top of a 7.3 millimetres (0.29 in) HHA plate fitted with a 10 millimetres (0.39 in) liner on the interior — a mass efficiency of 3.5; however the higher thickness decreased the thickness efficiency to 0.8 compared to the other tested armour layouts.

The Stryker can be fitted with MEXAS applique armour in order to provide protection against 14.5 mm HMG rounds. In 2001 it was discovered that the chemical composition of some ceramic tiles had been altered without notifying the US Army and unapproved sub-contractors supplied the ceramic tiles. The amount of different tile variations allowed by the Army was exceeded drastically — instead of an approved number of six variations the Stryker utilized 39 after undergoing several design changes. This resulted in the early Strykers requiring an additional 3 millimetres (0.12 in) thick steel plate. According to IBD Deisenroth however, all changes had been communicated to General Dynamics, but General Dynamics did not inform the Army. Ulf Deisenroth, president of IBD, claimed that he was never informed about the Army only allowing six ceramic tile variations. Later the supplier of the ceramic tiles was changed to fix these problems.

== Applications ==
MEXAS is used on several vehicles of the German Army like the ATF Dingo, Fuchs 1A7 or the Panzerhaubitze 2000. Some versions of the Leopard 2 MBT utilize MEXAS-H armour at the hull. Prior deployment on peace-keeping missions, vehicles of different countries have been fitted with MEXAS. Norwegian M113s and German MAN trucks have been fitted with MEXAS prior their deployment in KFOR. Some Canadian Leopard 1s, M113s and LAVs have been upgraded with MEXAS. Uparmoured Canadian Leopard 1s have been used in the KFOR and as part of the ISAF in Afghanistan. Other vehicles protected by MEXAS armour include versions of the Swedish Pansarbandvagn 302 and Combat Vehicle 90, the Greek variant Leopard 2 HEL, the Austrian ASCOD Ulan, the Véhicule de l'Avant Blindé, the Textron M1117 armored security vehicle, the Coyote reconnaissance vehicle, the ST Kinetics Bionix AFV and the US Stryker vehicles.

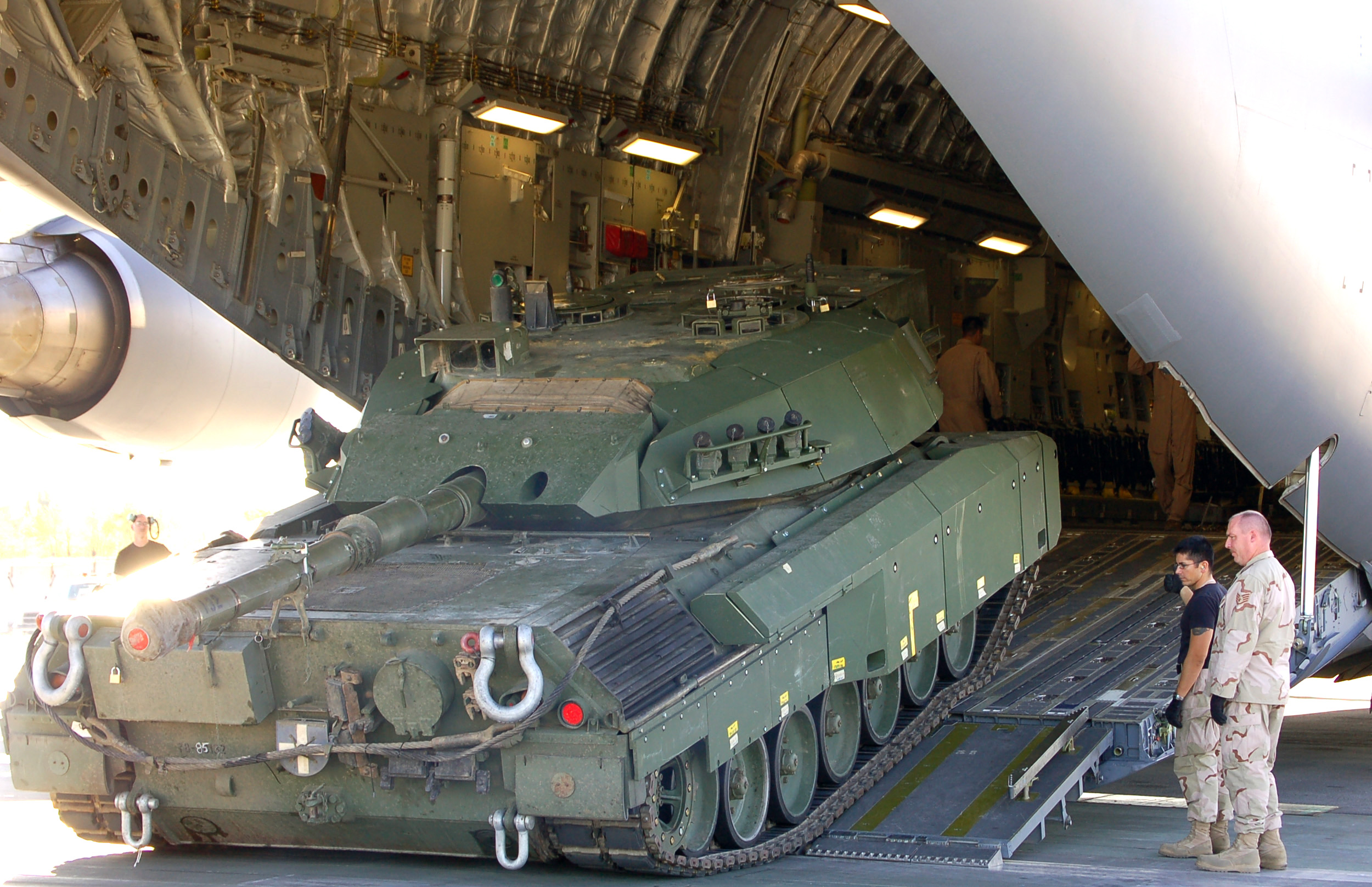
Canadian Leopard C2 heavily up-armoured with MEXAS-M being deployed to Afghanistan

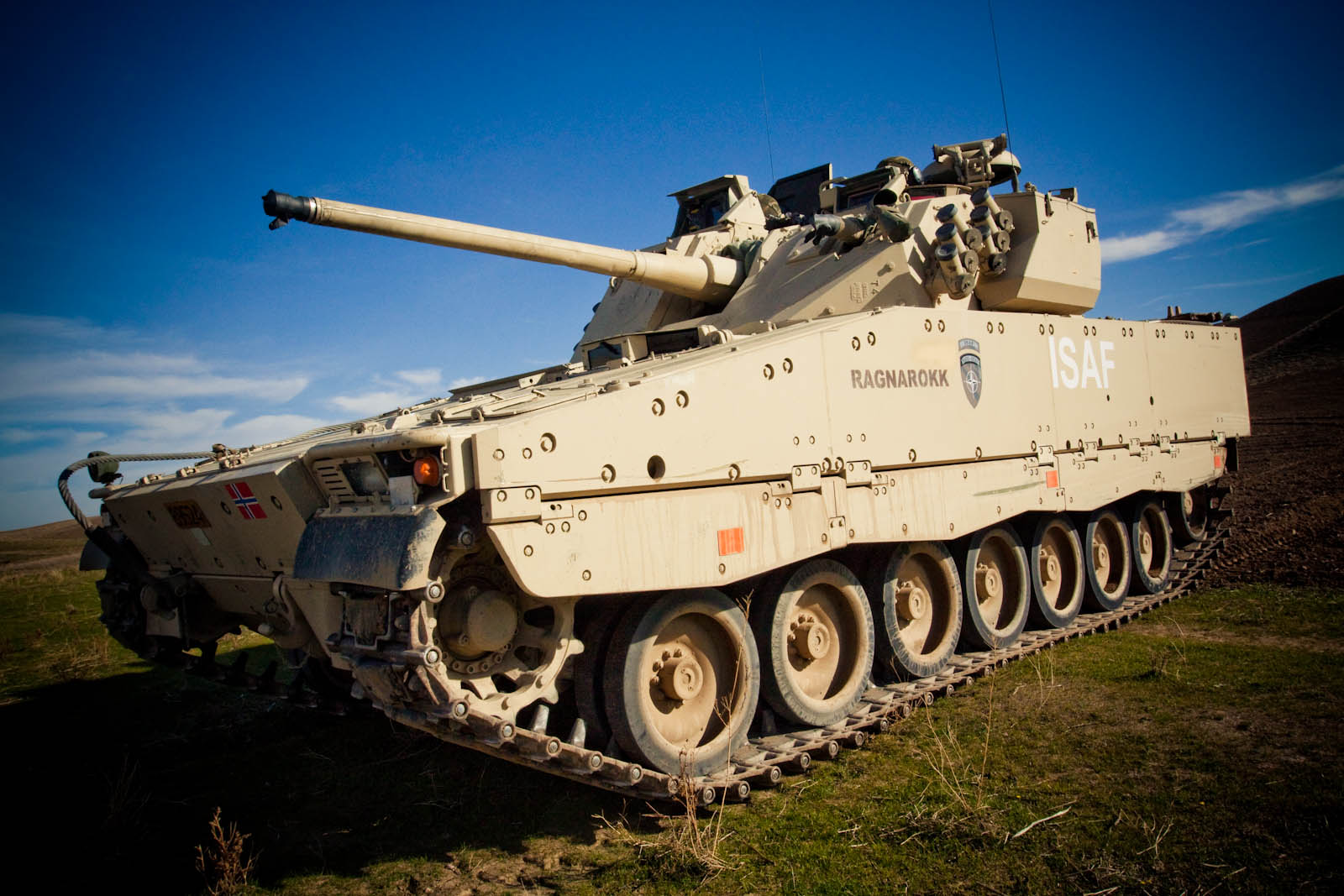
Some CV90 like this CV9030N are fitted with MEXAS

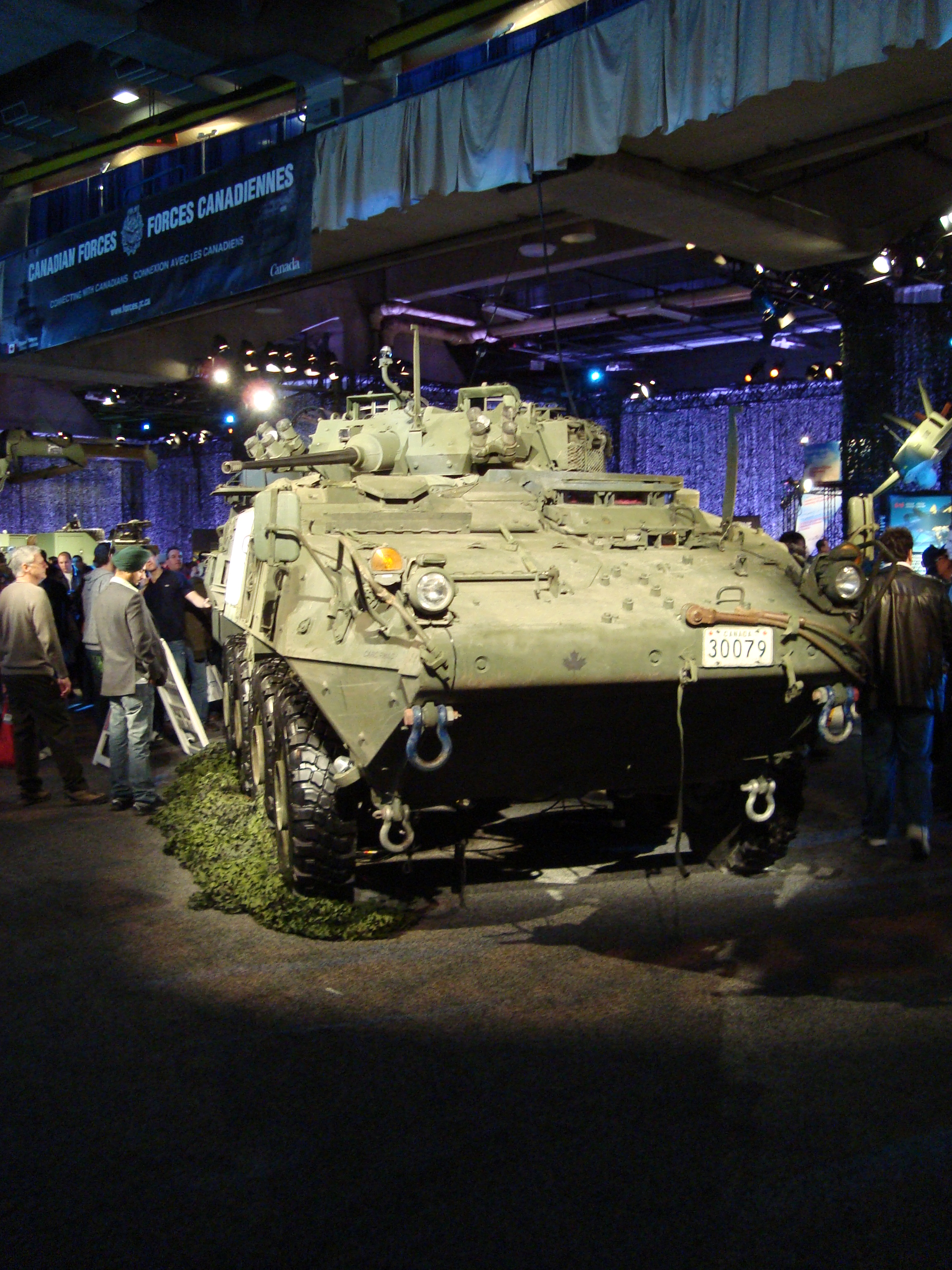
The Canadian LAV III is utilizing MEXAS

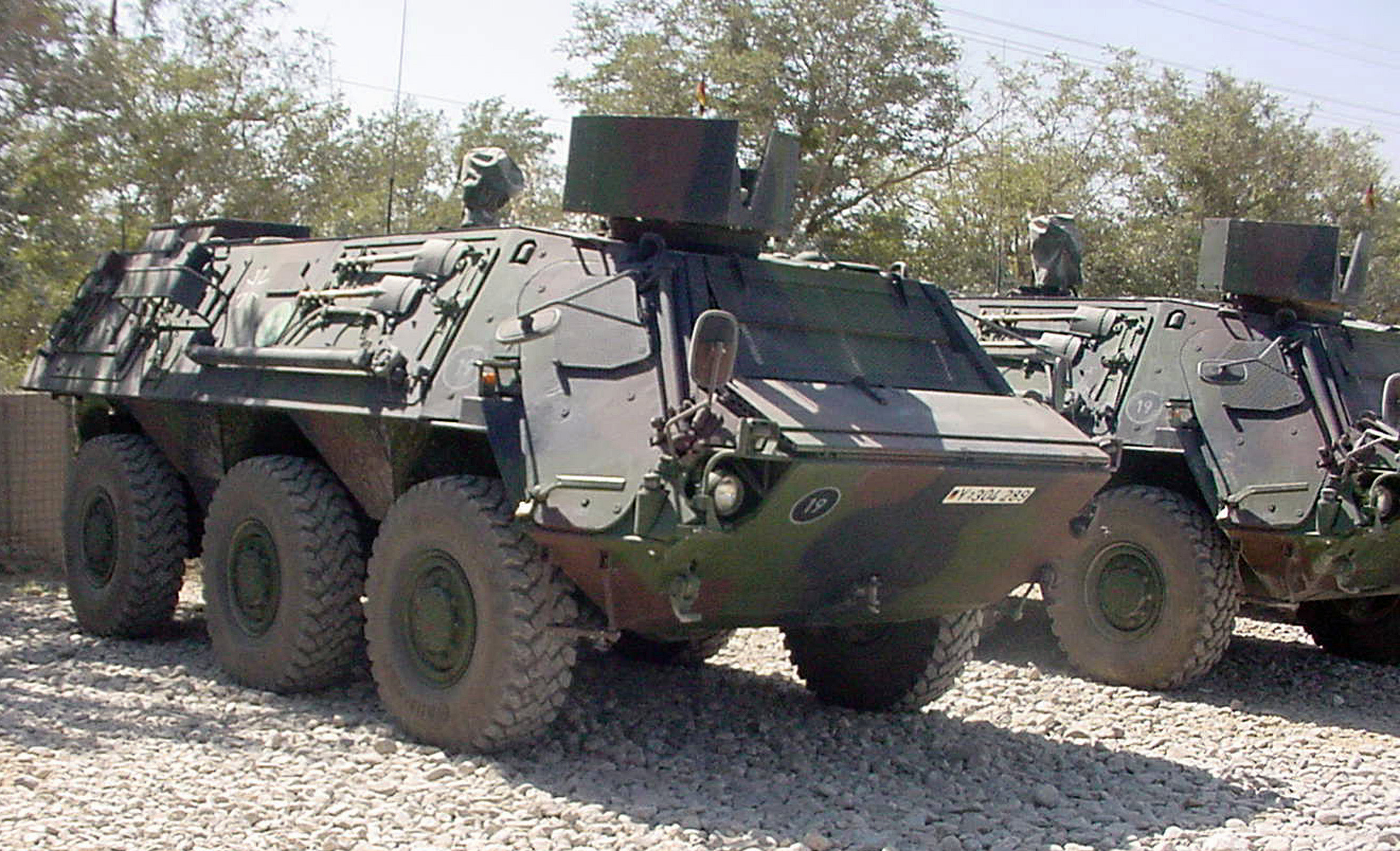
German Fuchs fitted with MEXAS located in Afghanistan during Operation Enduring Freedom

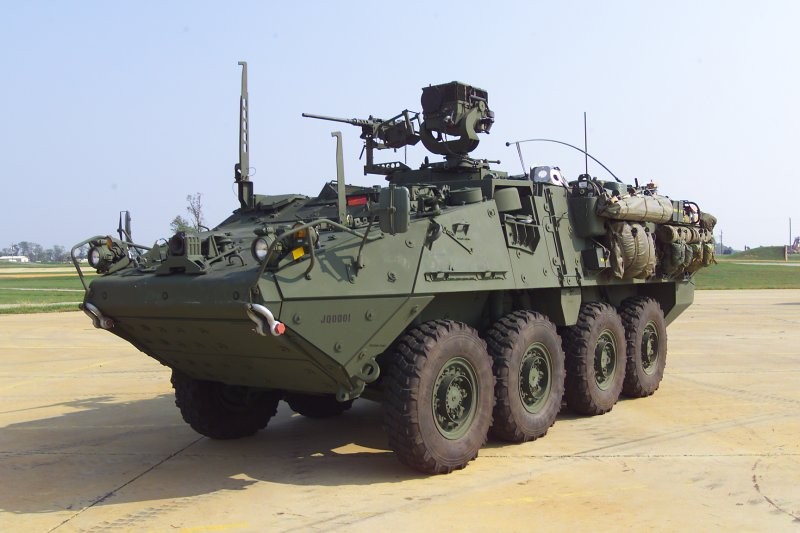
The US Stryker can be up-armoured with MEXAS to resist HMG fire

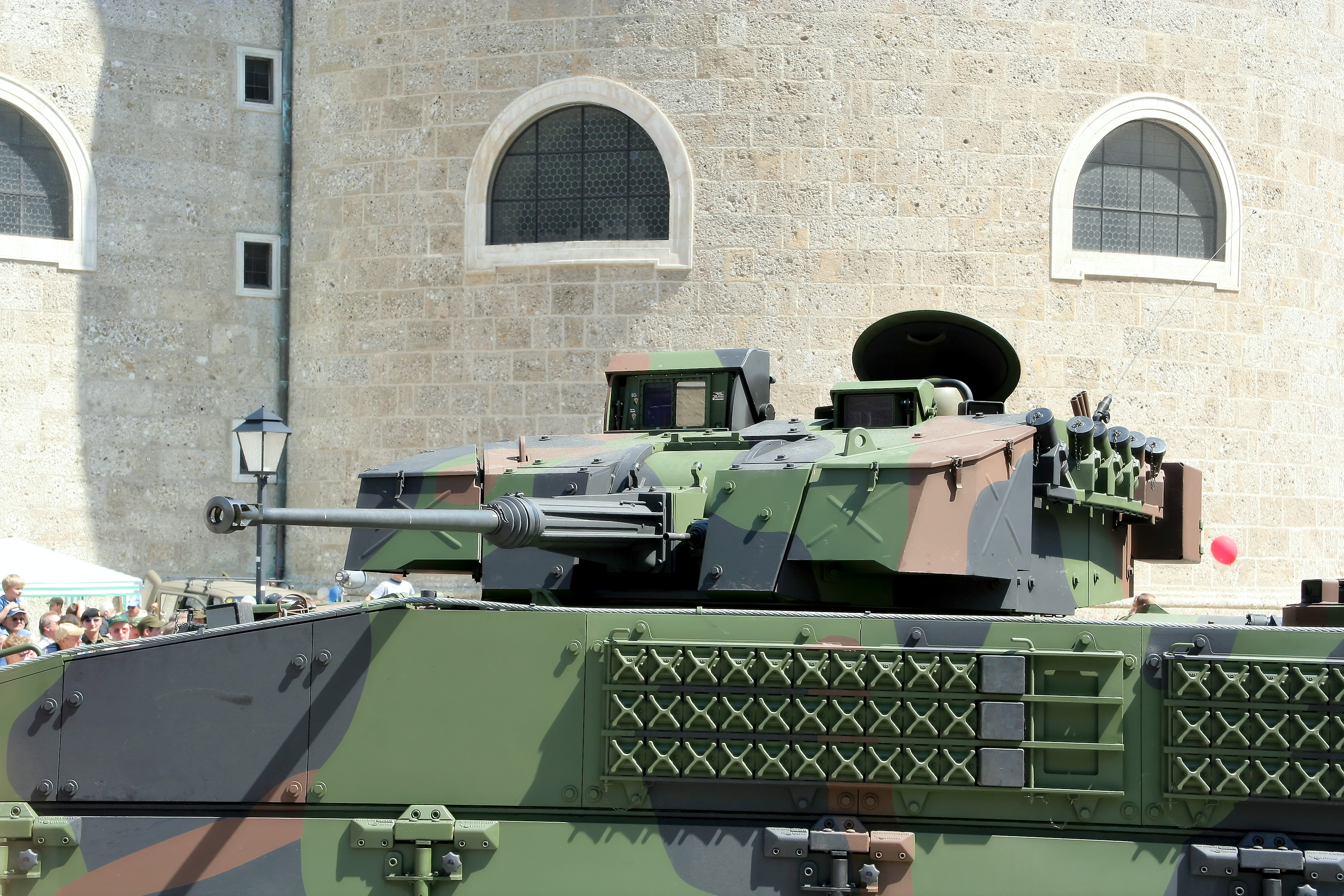
The bolts holding the MEXAS armour panels are clearly visible on this ASCOD Ulan

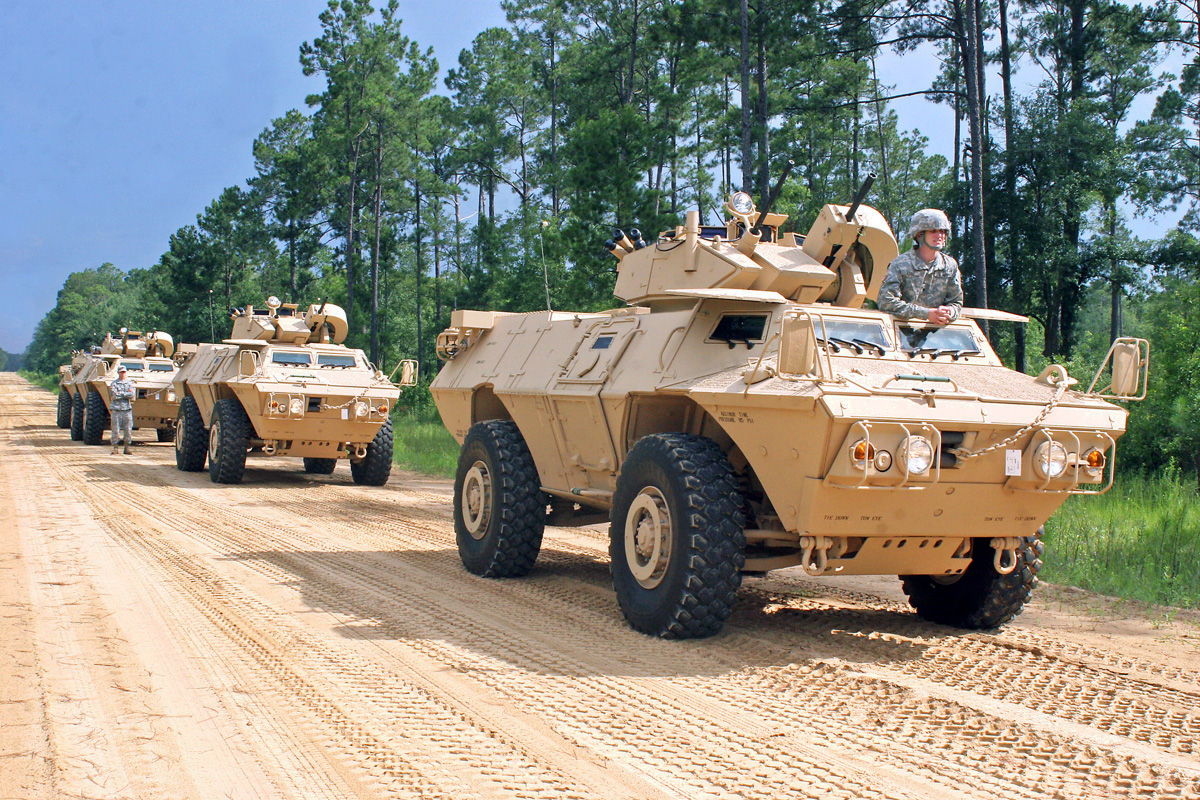
The M1117 ASV utilizes MEXAS for ballistic and mine protection

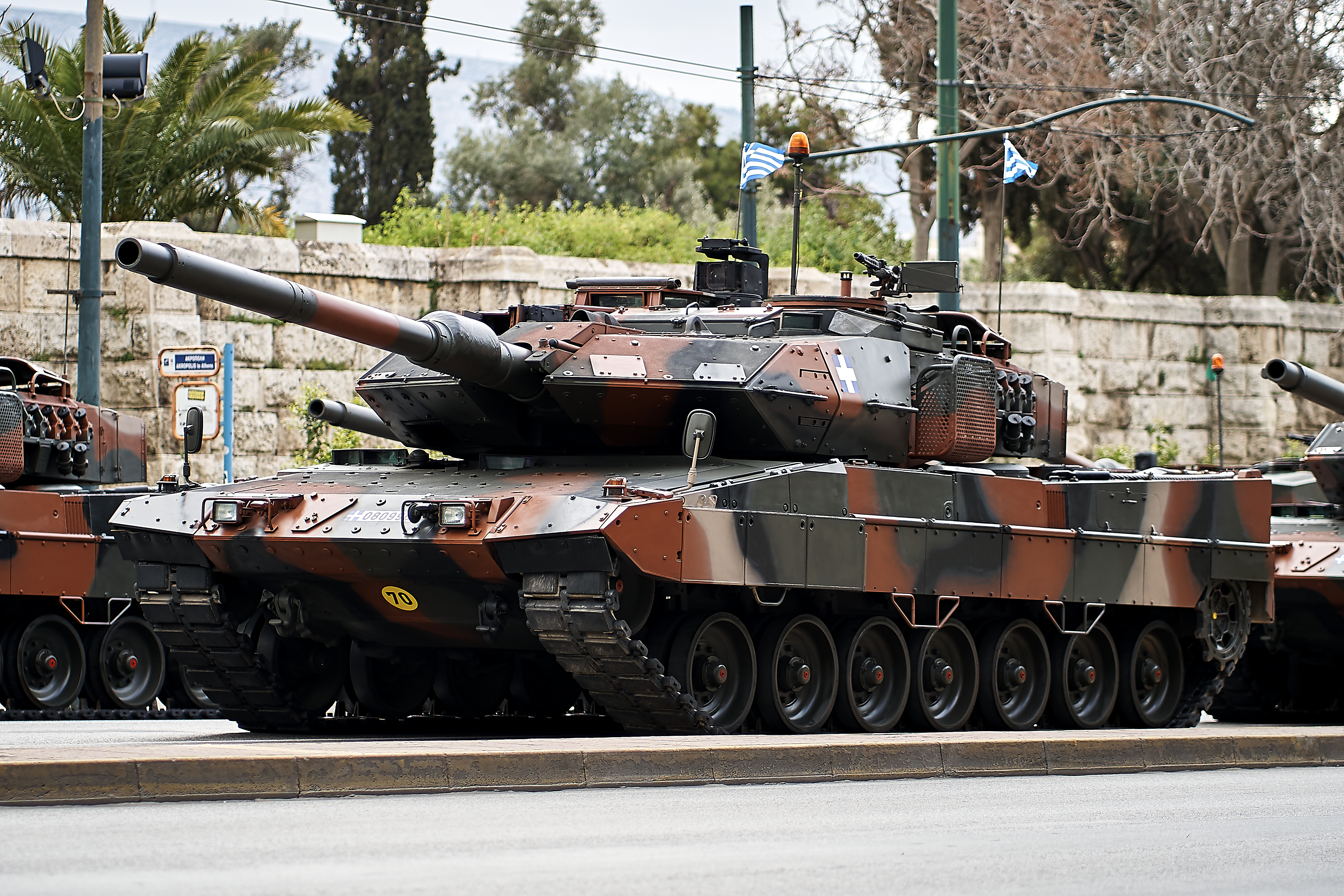
The Leopard 2 HEL of the Greek Army, using a full MEXAS package, for frontal, side as well as upper glacis and crew hatch protection.
