= ATF Dingo =

Dingo 2
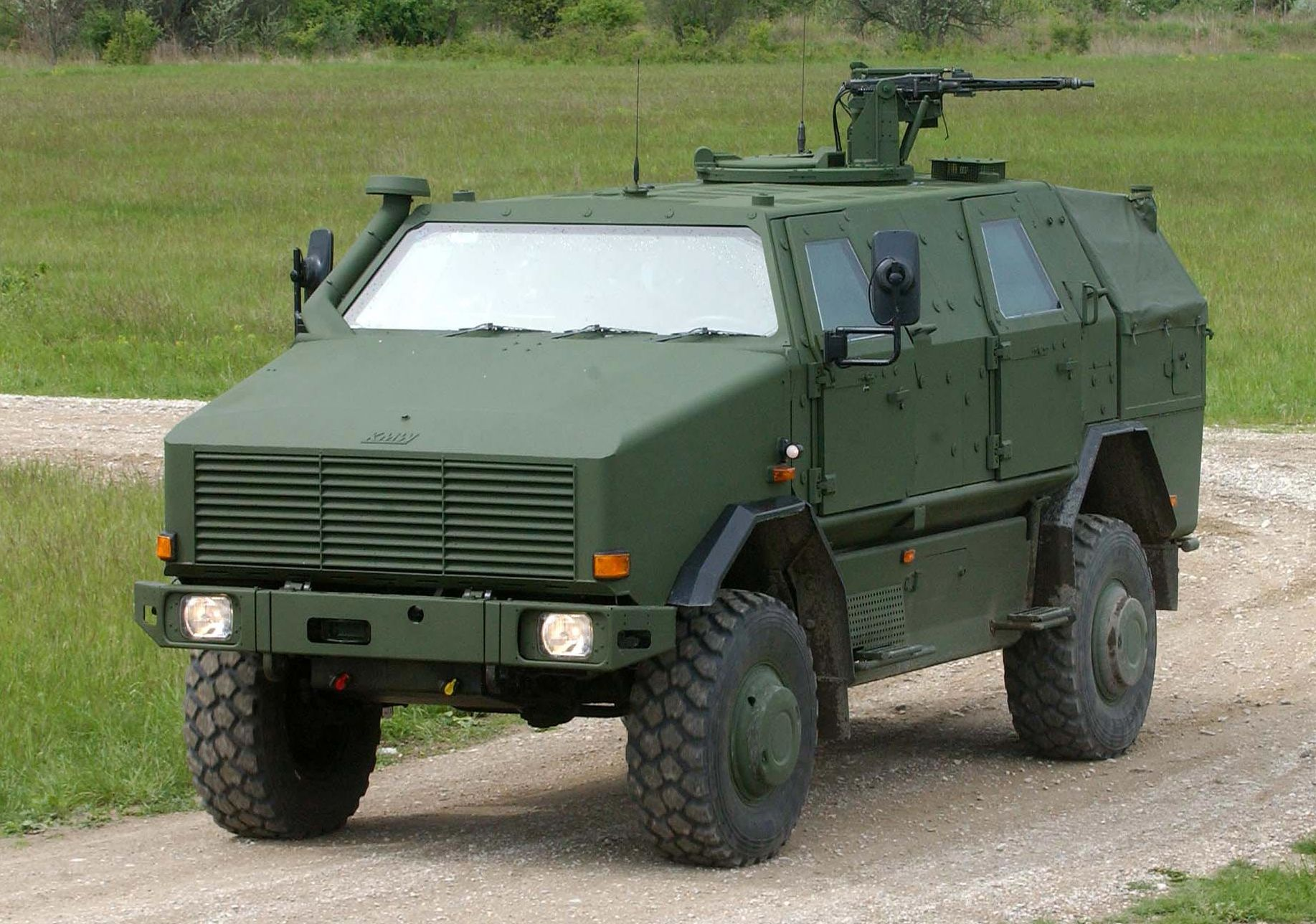
- ATF Dingo 2 with a mounted machine gun
- Type: Infantry mobility vehicle
- Place of origin: Germany

Service history
- In service: 2000–present
- Used by: Operators
- Wars: War in Afghanistan; Russo-Ukrainian War; Russian invasion of Ukraine

Production history
- Manufacturer: KNDS Deutschland
- Unit cost: ~$500,000 (2006)

Specifications
- Mass: 8.8 - 11.9 t
- Length: 5.45 m (short); 6.08 m (long)
- Width: 2.3 m
- Height: 2.5 m
- Crew: 2 crew (Driver and remote weapons system Officer) 8 passengers
- Armor: MEXAS
- Main armament: 1 × MG 3 light machine gun 1× M2 Browning Machine Gun 1 × HK GMG
- Engine: Diesel; 160 kW
- Suspension: 4x4
- Operational range: 1,000 km
- Maximum speed: 90+ km/h

The ATF Dingo is a German heavily armored military MRAP infantry mobility vehicle based on a Unimog chassis with a V-hull design, produced by KNDS Deutschland (formerly Krauss-Maffei Wegmann (KMW)). The first prototype of the Dingo 1 was completed in 1995 and the first production Dingo 1 entered service in 2000 with the German Army. It is designed to withstand land mines, rifle fire, artillery fragments and NBC-threats. ATF stands for Allschutz-Transport-Fahrzeug, meaning all-protected transport vehicle in German. It is named after the Australian native dog, the dingo. The Dingo 2 entered service in late 2004 after undergoing trials from November 2003-May 2004.

Textron signed an exclusive deal to produce and market KMW's (since April 8, 2024 KNDS Deutschland) Dingo in the United States. However, Textron chose its own more expensive and heavier M1117 armored security vehicle for the MRAP competition, which did not receive a contract.

== Design ==
The ATF Dingo has a modular design with five elements: chassis, protection cell, storage space, engine compartment, and bottom mine blast deflector. Its design is lighter and includes an armored chassis with a blast pan instead of the more common monocoque hull found in modern blast resistant vehicles. IBD's layered MEXAS is used and the windows are angled to deflect blasts and bullets. A tarpaulin is used over the back storage area instead of metal to save weight.

The Dingo's standard armament is a Rheinmetall MG3 7.62 mm machine gun in a remote-controlled turret on the top of the vehicle, borrowed from KNDS Deutschland's Fennek. The operator sits safely inside the cabin, controlling the weapon with an electro-optical sight with night vision capability.

In 2008 the Bundeswehr ordered several hundred fully remote-controlled weapons stations from KMW, for its Dingos and other armored vehicles: the light FLW 100 (for the MG3 or the Heckler & Koch MG4), and the heavy FLW 200 (for the M3M .50 BMG or the HK GMG automatic grenade launcher). The weapons station is controlled by an operator viewing a monitor inside the vehicle.

The ATF Dingo 2 is an advanced version of the Dingo, based on the upgraded Unimog U 5000 chassis.

== Operational use ==
In September 2022, Germany announced that it would provide 50 ATF Dingos to Ukraine to use in the 2022 Russian invasion of Ukraine. As of 3 September 2024, seven units were destroyed and one was damaged. By 2023 the German military had around 700 Dingo 2s in service.

== Operators ==
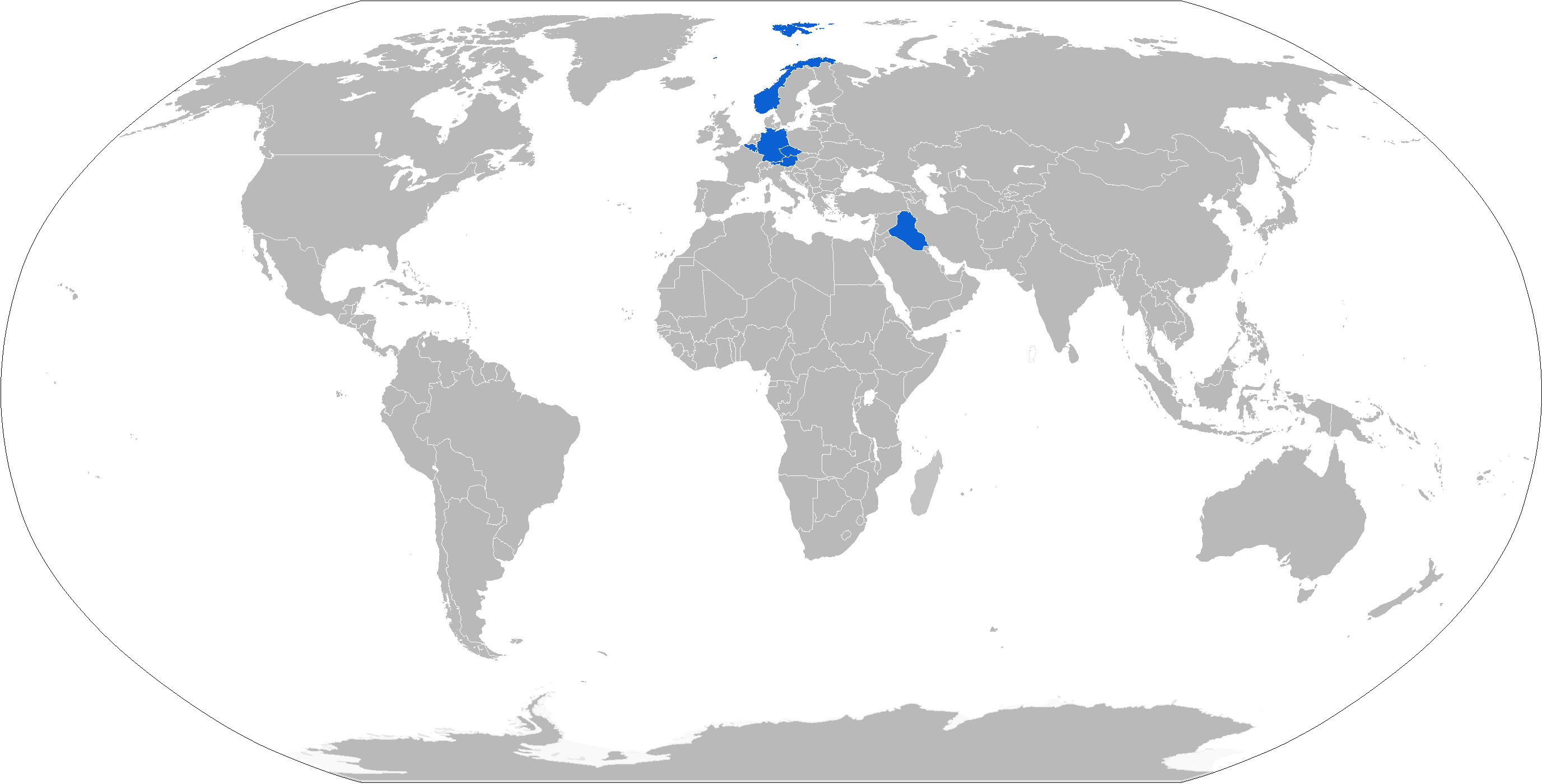
Map of ATF Dingo operators

=== Current operators ===
country	version	ordered	options	delivered	notes
Germany - Bundeswehr (Army)	Dingo 1	147	0	147	
Germany - Bundeswehr (Army)	Dingo 2 A1/A2/A2.3	287	0	287	
Germany - Bundeswehr (Army)	Dingo 2 BÜR (ground surveillance radar)	78	0	2	
Germany - Bundeswehr (Army)	Dingo 2 A3 system repair	25	0	4	
Germany - Bundeswehr (Army)	Dingo 2 C1 GSI battle damage repair	48	0	48	deliv. by end 2010
Germany - Bundeswehr (Army)	Dingo 2 A3.2 troop transport	45	0	45	deliv. by end 2010
Germany - Bundeswehr (Army)	Dingo 2 A3.2 operational intelligence	20	0	20	ordered 17.11.2010
Germany - Bundeswehr (Army)	Dingo 2 A3.3 troop transport	39	0	39	ordered 17.11.2010
Germany - Bundeswehr (Army)	Dingo 2 A4.1	50 + 65	0	0	50 ordered in November 2023 65 ordered in December 2024
Germany - Federal Police	Dingo 2 Polizei	2	0	2	
Belgium - Belgian Land Component	Dingo 2 MPPV Fus (patrol)	158	0	158	
Belgium - Belgian Land Component	Dingo 2 MPPV PC (mobile command post)	52	0	52	
Belgium - Belgian Land Component	Dingo 2 MPPV ambulance	10	0	10	
Belgium - Belgian Land Component	Dingo 2 (new variants)	0	66	0	
Luxembourg - Luxembourg Army	Dingo 2 Protected Reconnaissance Vehicle	48	0	48	
Austria - Austrian Armed Forces	Dingo 2 ATF	60	0	60	
Austria - Austrian Armed Forces	Dingo 2 AC NBC reconnaissance	12	0	12	
Austria - Austrian Armed Forces	Dingo 2 AC ambulance	3	0	3	
Czech Republic - Czech Army	Dingo 2 A2	21	0	21	
Norway - Norwegian Army	Dingo 2 A3	20	yes	20	All 20 donated to Ukraine in 2024.
Iraqi Kurdistan - Peshmerga	Dingo 1	20	0	20	
Qatar - Qatari Army	Dingo 2 A3.3 troop transport	125	0	125	
Serbia - Serbian Army	Dingo 2 ambulance	2	-	-	Donated in 2024
Ukraine - Ukrainian Ground Forces	Unknown	0	0	50	Donated during the 2022 Russian Invasion of Ukraine

== Gallery ==
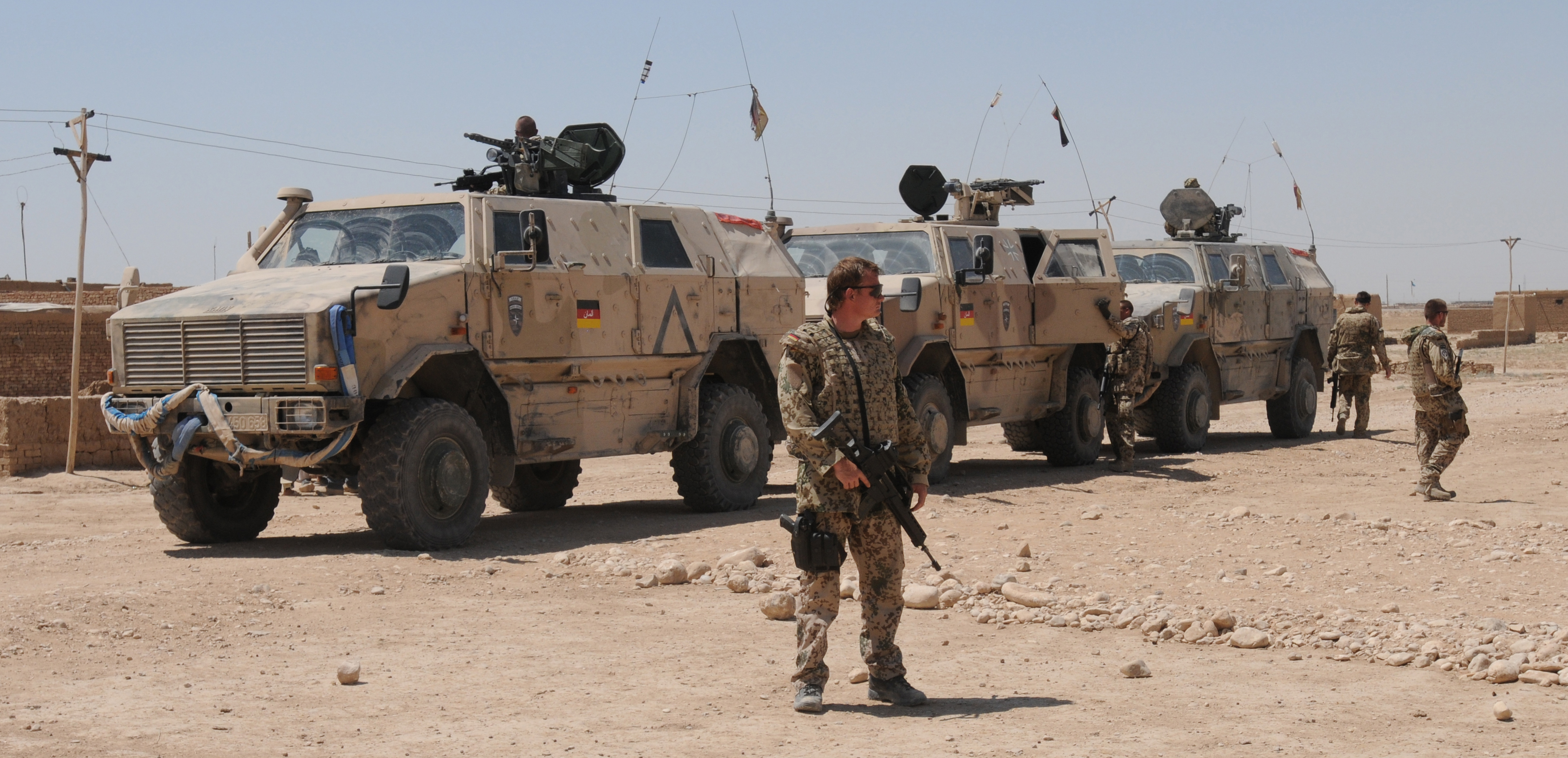
Three German Army ATF Dingos in Afghanistan.

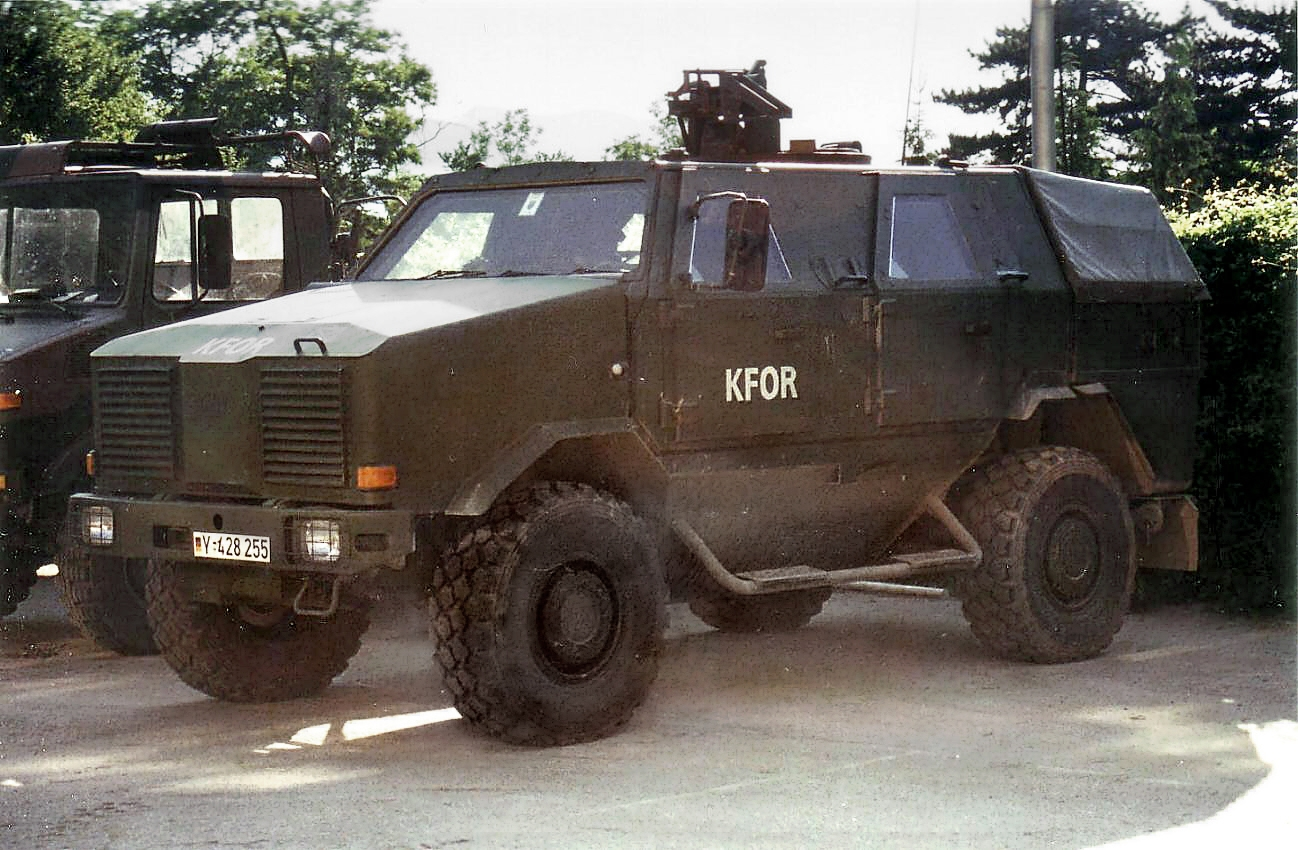
ATF Dingo 1 of the German Army deployed in Kosovo.

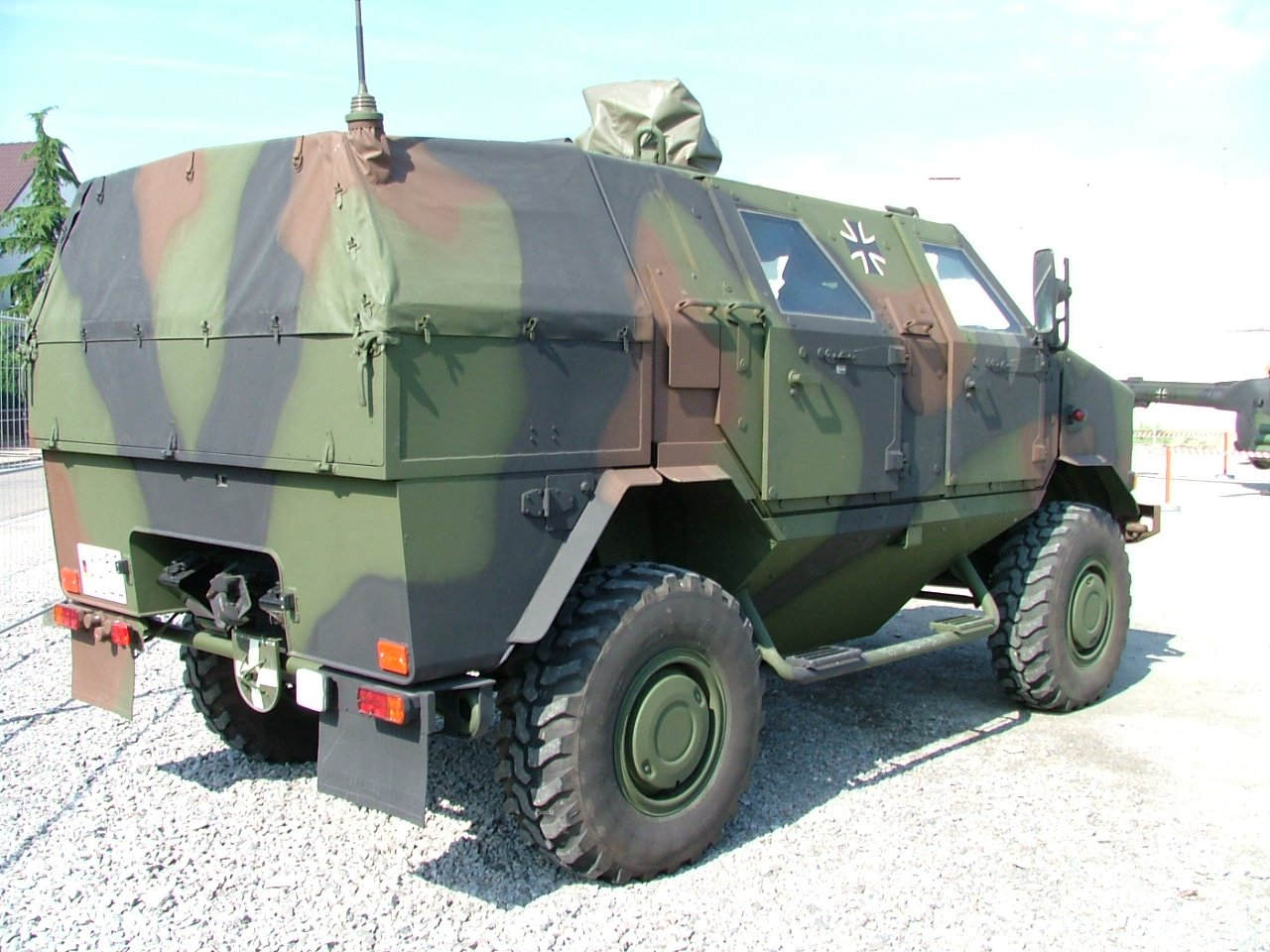
German Army Dingo 1's rear view.

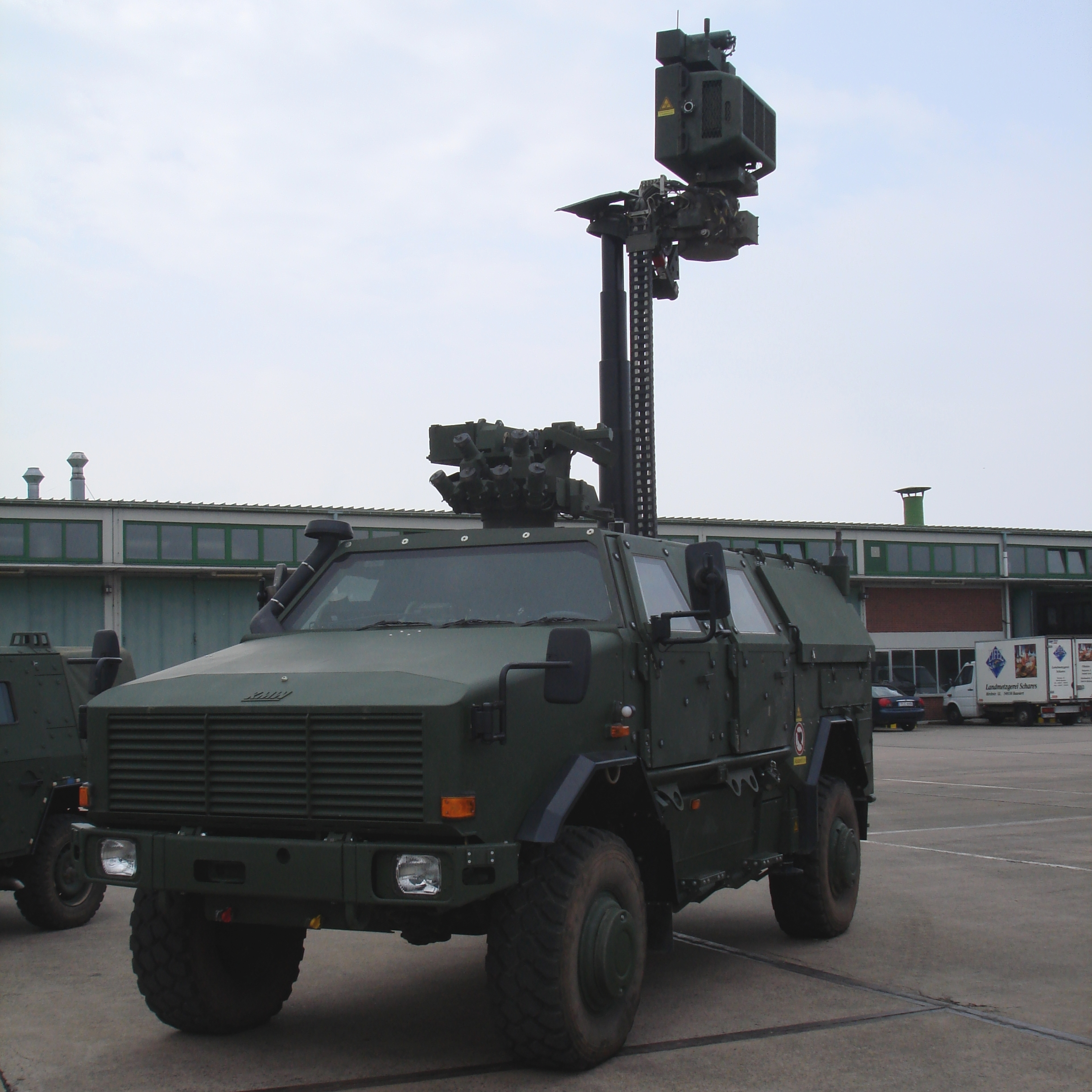
German Dingo 2 with ground surveillance radar (BÜR)

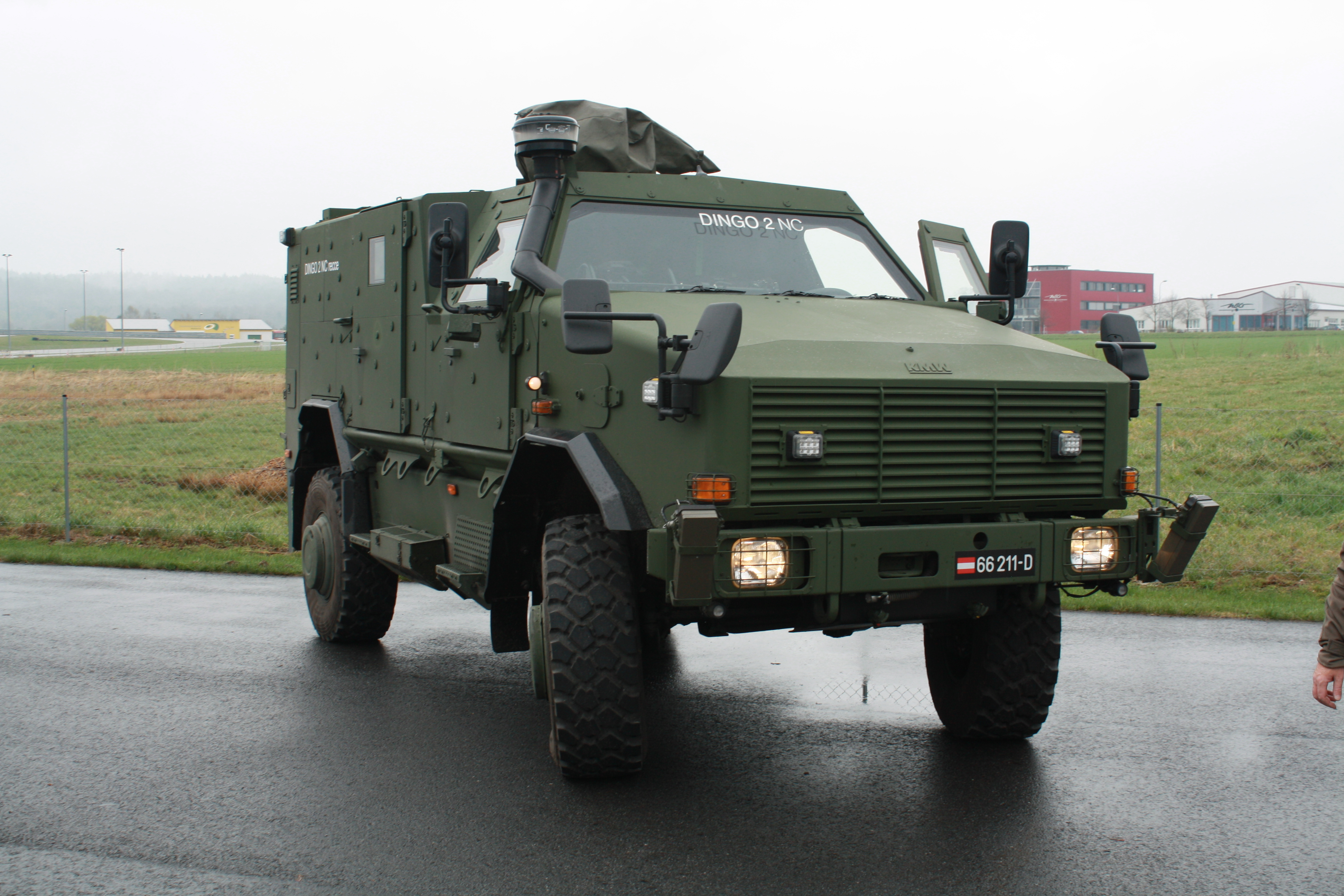
Austrian Dingo 2 NC

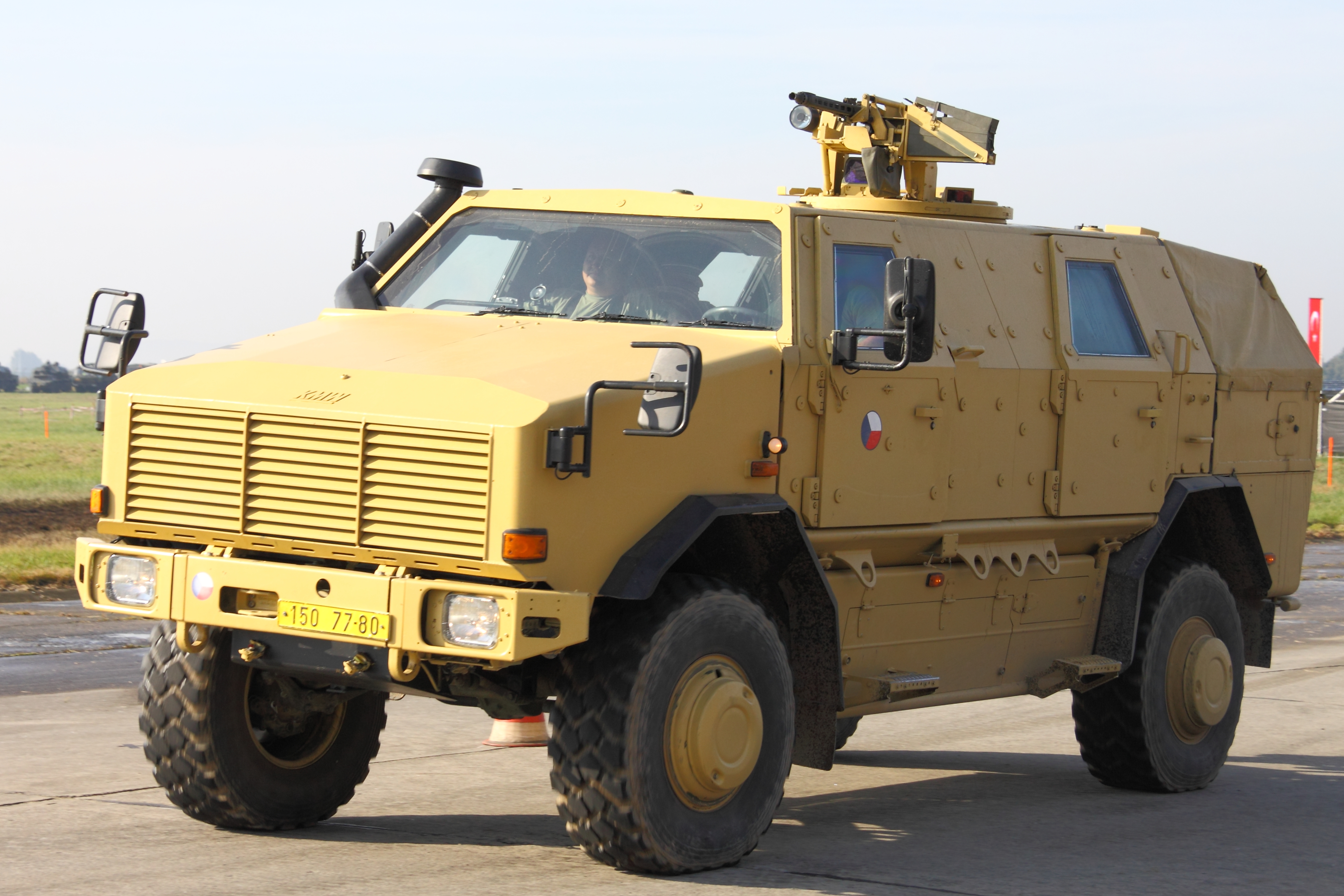
Czech Dingo 2 A2

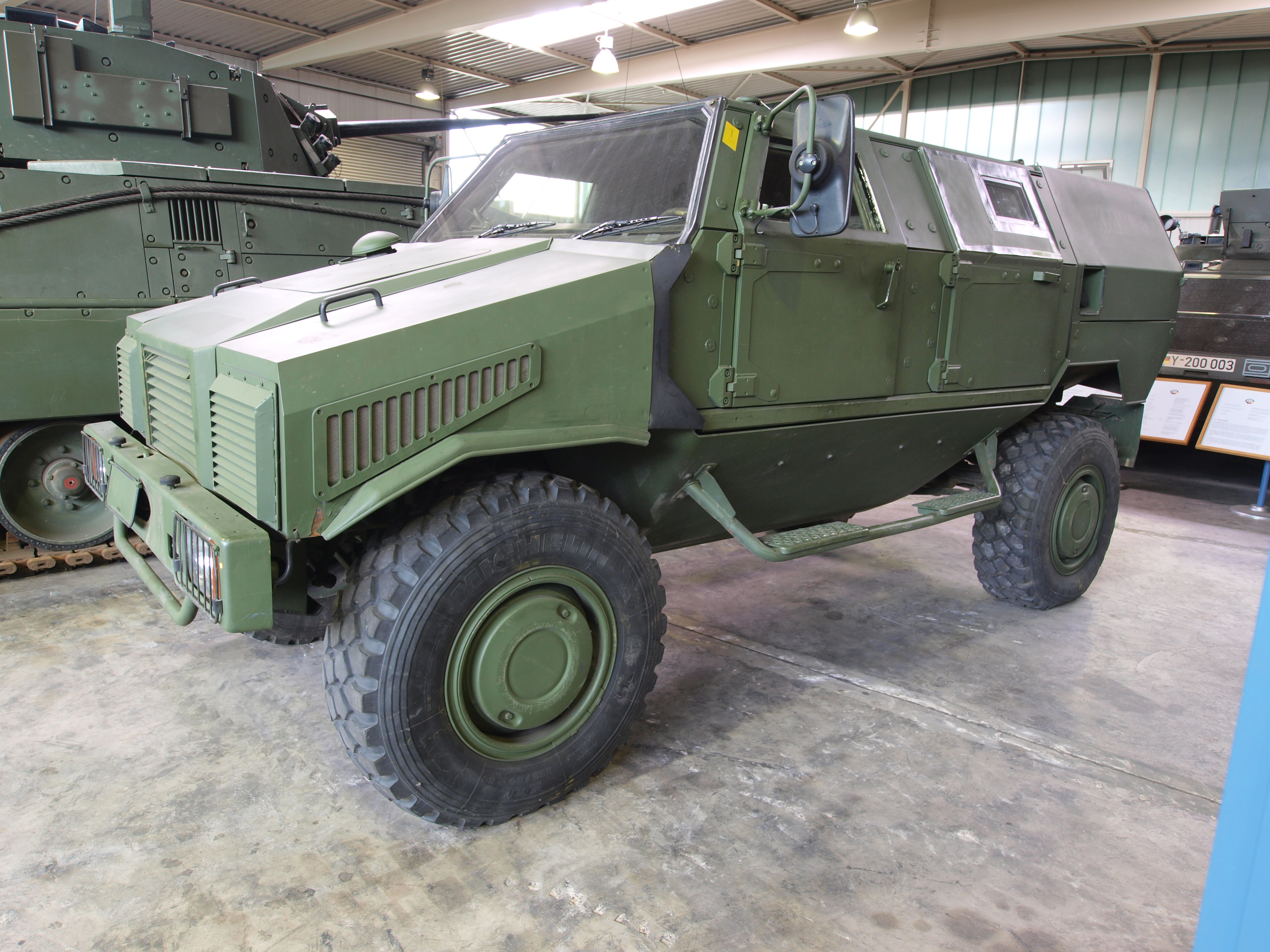
Prototype Dingo (Dingo WTS)

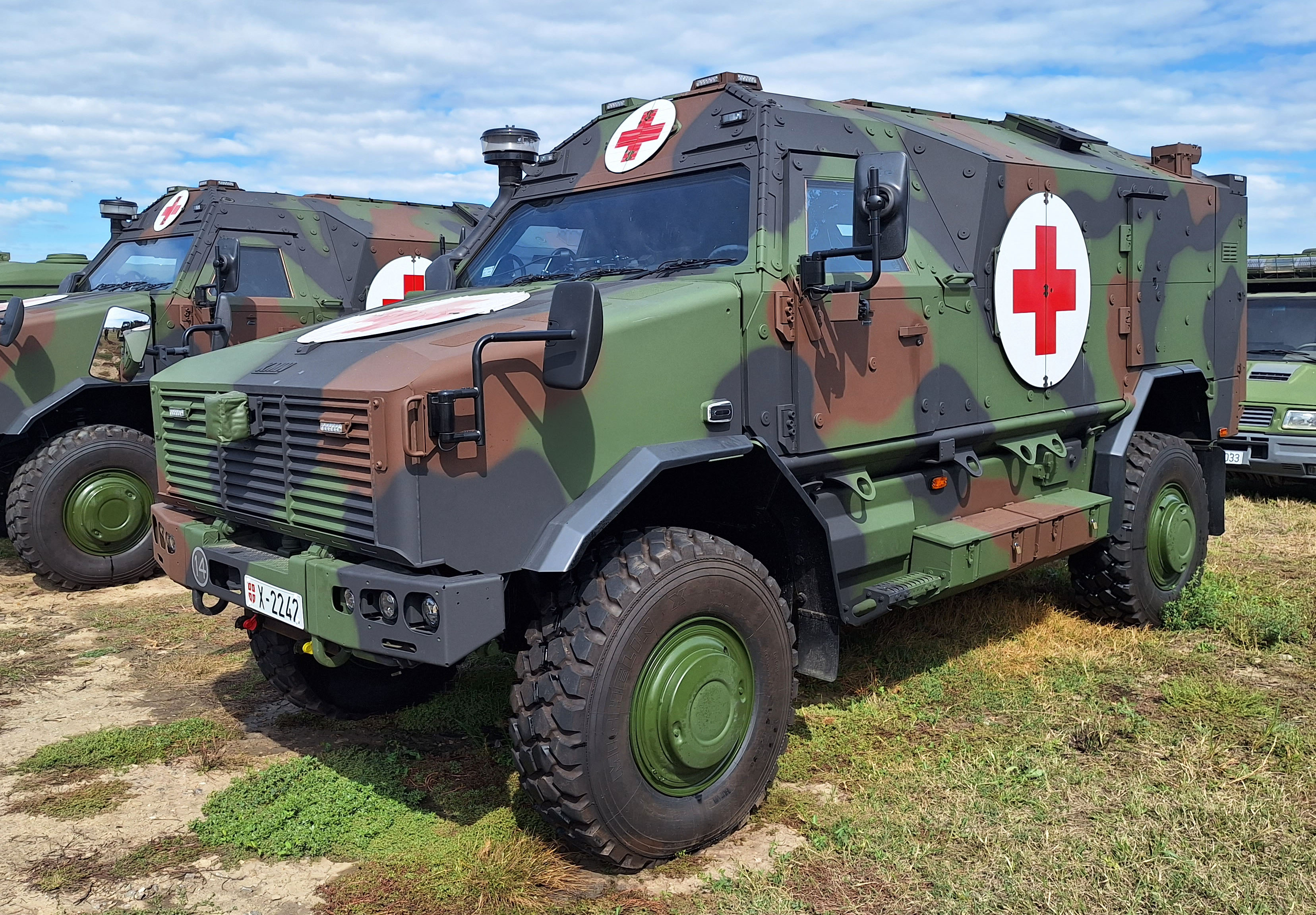
Serbian Dingo 2
