= Artillery gun module =

German 155mm self-propelled howitzer

Donar artillery system
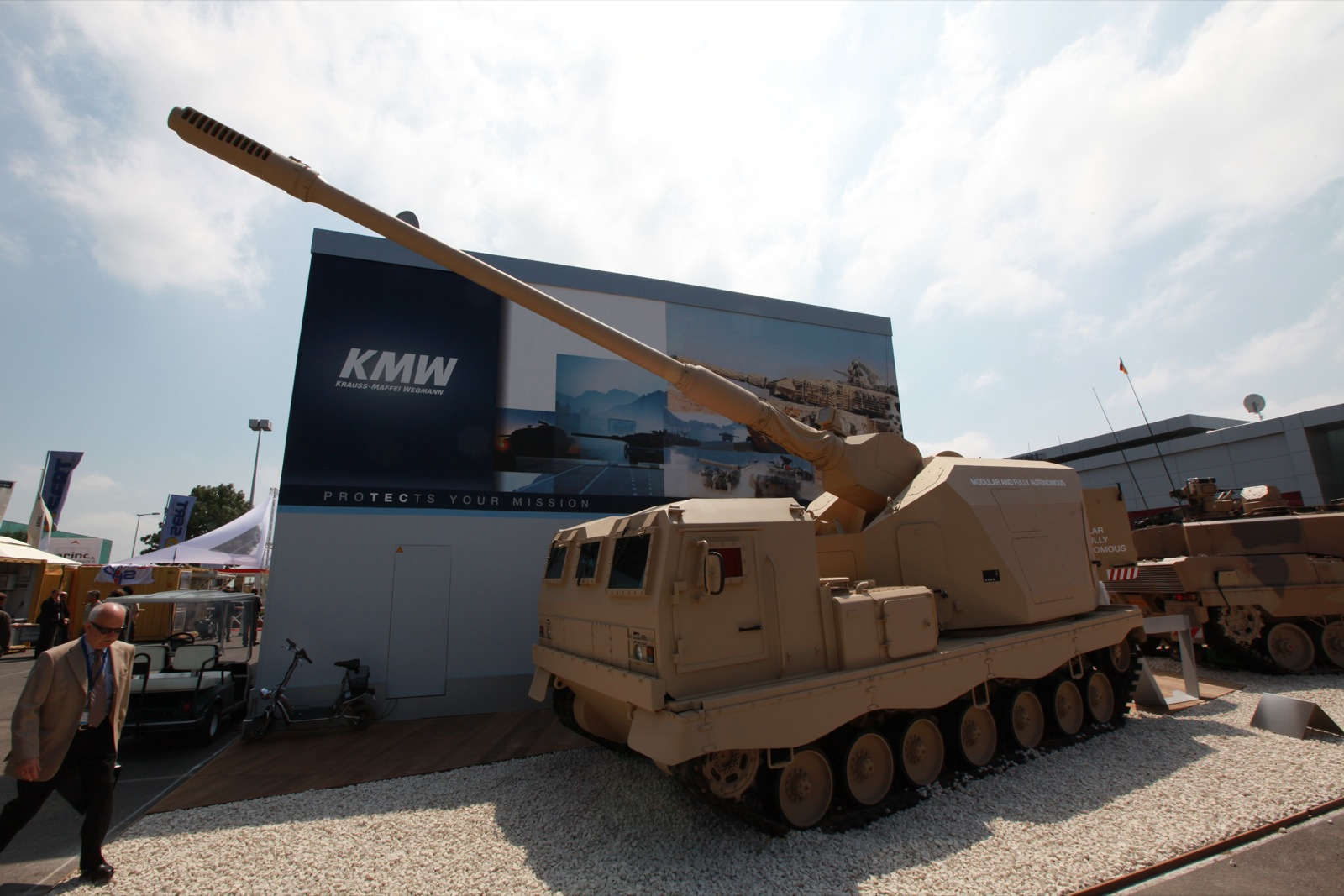
- Type: Self-propelled artillery
- Place of origin: Germany

Production history
- Designer: Krauss-Maffei Wegmann
- Designed: 2004
- Manufacturer: Krauss-Maffei Wegmann
- Unit cost: € 12 million for the first order
- Produced: Since 2022
- No. built: 18 on order
- Variants: Operational; RCH 155 modules on: Boxer A3 (wheeled); Boxer Tracked; Piranha AAC (Advanced Artillery Carrier), based on the Mowag Piranha IV 10×10; Prototypes: Nemesis, based on the ASCOD 2 platform; Potential platforms_; Armoured Iveco Trakker 8×8; Navistar truck 6×6

Specifications
- Mass: Module: 12.5 tons, with MLRS hull 27 tons
- Length: 10.42 m (34 ft 2 in)
- Width: 2.97 m (9 ft 9 in)
- Height: 3.06 m (10 ft)
- Main armament: Rheinmetall 155 mm L52 Artillery Gun (30 rounds)

The Artillery gun module (AGM, Artillerie-Geschütz-Modul) is an air-portable 155 mm self-propelled howitzer designed by Krauss-Maffei Wegmann. It is based on technology used in the German Army Panzerhaubitze 2000 (PzH 2000) system, to provide more air portable self-propelled artillery, transportable by Airbus A400 aircraft. The RCH 155 is a modified variant of the AGM.

The system is fully autonomous, the crew sitting in the cab, with similar performance to the PzH 2000, but with reduced cost, crew levels and weight. The AGM uses the PzH 2000 ballistic fire-control computer with integrated NATO Armaments Ballistic Kernel and the Krauss-Maffei Wegmann Artillery Command and Control System. It is a modular system, the gun module can be fitted on a tracked or wheeled chassis. Costs can be reduced by fitting it to a user's suitable chassis of choice. Current development vehicles use a MLRS chassis. A vehicle independent auxiliary power unit (allowing the gun to be used with the carrier engine shut down) and an inertial reference unit with a Global Positioning System (GPS) connection are fitted. During trials in 2006, a demonstrator vehicle fired a volley of ten 155 mm rounds in 2 minutes and 19 seconds with a crew of two being seated in the fully armoured protected cab.

== Variants ==
=== RCH 155 ===
==== Boxer vehicles ====
The AGM platform on a Boxer module can be used both by the 8×8 Boxer and by the tracked Boxer. The tracked variant was presented at AUSA 2025.

=== AGM - tracked armoured fighting vehicles ===
==== Donar ====
The Donar was the first vehicle equipped with the AGM presented by KNDS Deutschland. It is based on the ASCOD AFV chassis and was presented in 2004.

==== GDELS Nemesis ====
A new tracked variant of the AGM was presented At FEINDEF 2025, in May 2025, by General Dynamics European Land Systems. This system is based on the ASCOD 2 platform, and is known as the GDELS Nemesis.

=== AGM - wheeled armoured fighting vehicles ===
==== Piranha IV 10×10 / Grizzly LAV ====
In August 2022, the Armasuisse pre-selected 3 systems to be tested as part of the "Artillerie Wirkplattform und Wirkmittel 2026" programme, the selection of the successor to the M109 KAWEST WE. The Piranha IV It competed against the Archer artillery system (Rheinmetall HX2 8×8) and the RCH 155 variant (based on the Boxer 8×8 platform). The trials of the system took place in 2023 and 2024. In October 2024, the Swiss Army selected the Mowag Piranha IV 10×10 as a platform for the AGM module.

The Grizzly LAV was presented in May 2026 in Canada by General Dynamics Land Systems Canada using a LAV 6 platform with the RCH 155 gun.

=== AGM - trucks ===
==== Iveco Trakker 8×8 ====
A design of such a vehicle exists. It is based on a 40t capable military truck which is already in use in the German Army. It keeps the capability to be used in direct hit fashion with optronics capabilities. It is equipped with a hydraulic compartment, and can receive an auxiliary power unit to power the turret and the electronic while keeping the engine of the truck off.

== Operators ==
=== Future operators ===
==== Piranha IV 10×10 platform ====
Switzerland (32)
The Swiss Army selected the RCH-155 on the Mowag Piranha IV 10×10 as successor to the M109 KAWEST WE in November 2024. It was selected through the Artillerie Wirkplattform und Wirkmittel 2026 programme. The competitors were the BAE Bofors Archer on the Rheinmetall HX2 8×8 and the RCH-155 based on the Boxer A3. Trials took place in 2023 and 2024, and in September 2024, an evaluation report was released to the Armed Forces for the selection of the system. The Swiss Armed Forces are preparing the approval of the acquisition by the parliament in 2025, and in the meantime, integrating the system to the artillery command system, and integrating the communication systems to the platform. The quantity is yet to be determined publicly.
In the Armament Programme 2025, Switzerland allocated a budget of CHF 850 million for the purchase of 36 RCH-155, simulators, logistics systems, and ammunitions.
The contract was signed in June 2026, and includes:
- 1 prototype (delivery in 2027, qualification from 2028)
- 32 DONAR (serial production from 2031)
- 32 reloading containers

=== Potential operators ===
Canada (99 to 102)
In 2025, the Canadian Army posted a RFI (request for information) regarding the purchase of a new self-propelled howitzer with its "Indirect Fire Modernization" programme.: The requests include a top speed of 80km/h and an operational range of 450km which would exclude tracked vehicles. The request includes minimal lethality requirements:
- Calibre: 155mm L/52
- Range:
  - a range of at least 30 km with conventional munitions (M795)
  - a range of at least 40 km with a next generation base bleed projectile (M1128)
- Capable to fire:
  - precision guided projectiles (M982 & M1156)
  - sensor Fuzed Anti-Armour Munitions (SMArt 155 or Bofors/Nexter Bonus)
  - MRSI (Multiple Round, Simultaneous Impact)
  - detect and neutralise close range threats in a direct fire role
- Shoot and scoot capability:
  - a battery of 6 howitzers must engage a target with a minimum of 96 rounds and come out of action in less than a total of three minutes
  - howitzers must displace at least 500m in less than two minutes after firing in a tactical environment
  - fire and engage indirect targets while on the move
This last requirement makes the AGM the only platform capable to fit all the requirements.
Italy
In September 2024, the government requested the parliament to approve the multiyear programme (SMD 11/2024) to purchase the RCH-155, several types of ammunition, supply vehicles and rescue vehicles.
The RCH-155 would replace the FH70 towed howitzers of its medium forces. An initial budget of €202 million is planned to initiate the project, and based on the resources available on the current budget. The start will enable to acquire a number of systems, develop the logistic support, set-up the training courses for the operators and the maintenance. An additional budget of €1.608 billion is planned to complete the project.
In November 2025, a Leonardo equivalent turret concept was unveiled, meaning that there will be a competition for the Italian programme.The turret is known as the RH1-155/52 HITFIRE, and it would be mounted on a Freccia Evo chassis. The cannon would be a new design, and be developed by Leonardo.
In December 2025, KNDS Deutschland and Leonardo formed a collaboration to mount the Artillery Gun Module on an enhanced armoured vehicle of Leonardo.
United States
In August 2024, Armin Papperger, the CEO of Rheinmetall, announced that the US Army showed interest in the system. The US Army is looking for a wheeled howitzer to compensate for the M777 supplied to Ukraine. At AUSA 2024, the US military mentioned its interest for a wheeled howitzer under the "mobile tactical cannon" capability. Several self-propelled howitzer will be evaluated, among which the Archer, the AGM / RCH 155 on two vehicles, the Piranha 10×10 and the Boxer, the K9A1 and the SIGMA 155 from Elbit Systems. The system will be selected in 2026, and a contract for a certain number of cannons is planned for 2027. The systems mentioned include the Archer and the AGM.

=== Failed sales ===
Israel
The Artillery Gun Module was a potential choice for the Israel Defense Forces as they seek to replace the M109 in their service. However, in 2017, it appeared that the IDF had selected a development of the ATMOS 2000 instead, possibly because they preferred a wholly Israeli produced system for legal reasons.

Spain (214)
The Spanish Army and the Marine Corps were looking for a successor to the M109A5 in 2025.
The programme had a pre-financing budget of €3 billion. The needs expressed were for a wheeled howitzer (86 units) and a tracked self-propelled howitzer (128 units).
One of the requirement mentions that the system has to be capable to be used in anti-ship operations, with moving targets. The other requirement included a barrel of 155mm L/47 to L/52 with a 40 km range minimum with base-bleed munitions.
For the tracked component of the programme, the pre-financing budget reaches €1.821 billion, and the systems to be included are:
- 128 tracked howitzers, based on ASCOD 2
- 21 recovery vehicles
- 59 command and control vehicles (48 for the Army, 11 for the Navy)
- Equipment for maintenance, training, logistics.
For the wheeled component of the programme, the pre-financing budget is €1.181 billion, and it includes:
- 86 wheeled self-propelled howitzers (8×8 or 10×10 chassis)
- 14 recovery vehicles
- 7 maintenance vehicles
- logistical vehicles
- complementary equipment (hypocelometers, simulators, reduced-fire systems, tube cleaning equipment)
The GDELS Nemesis using the AGM was the likely winner, while the wheeled variant would use the same artillery system, and be based on the Piranha Advanced Artillery Carrier (Piranha IV 10×10) that was already selected by the Swiss Army.
But in December 2025, the Spanish armed forces selected a collaboration between Indra and EM&E to develop the two systems. Later in March of 2026 Indra signed a deal with Hanwha Aerospace of Korea to develop and produce a Spanish version of K9 in Spain.

== See also ==
- Panzerhaubitze 2000 – German 155 mm self-propelled howitzer
- RCH 155
