= RCH 155 =

German 155 mm self-propelled howitzer

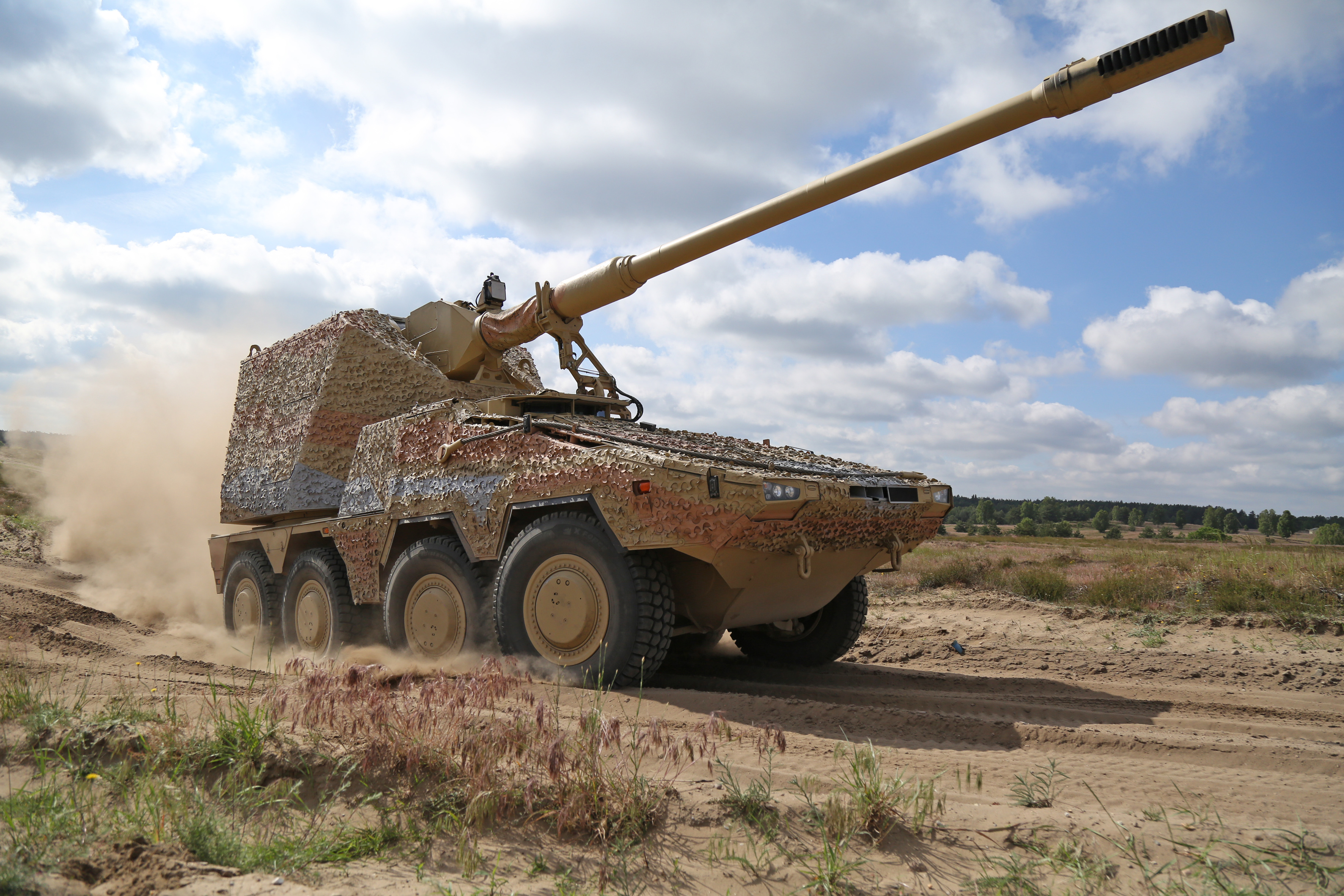
- A RCH 155 in the field
- Type: Self-propelled artillery
- Place of origin: Germany

Service history
- Used by: See operators below

Production history
- Designer: Krauss-Maffei Wegmann
- Designed: 2014–2024
- Manufacturer: KNDS Germany
- Developed from: Artillery Gun Module
- Unit cost: €12 million (2022) (Note: Unit cost is based on the 2022 €216 million contract for 18 systems, which is the first order for that system, and it is the only publicly known value.); €14.3 million (2025) (Note: Unit cost is based on the December 2025 €1.2 billion contract for 84 systems.)
- Produced: Since 2022
- No. built: 187 ordered

The RCH 155 (Remote Controlled Howitzer 155 mm) is a wheeled self-propelled howitzer developed by Krauss-Maffei Wegmann (now KNDS Deutschland).

The RCH 155 Module takes the firepower and the range of the PzH 2000 by using its gun (155 mm L/52), and combines it with an automated and remotely controlled gun module.

The intention of Krauss-Maffei Wegmann with this system was to create the ideal combination of artillery automation and protected wheeled mobility.

== Origin ==
The RCH-155 module is very similar to the Artillery Gun Module (AGM, Artillerie-Geschütz-Modul), but has a lower profile. The AGM was designed to have the firepower of the PzH 2000 in an air-portable package with the A400M aircraft this was possible when installed on an ASCOD 2 platform, known as the DONAR.

In 2014 with interest in installing the AGM on the Boxer, questions arose regarding its capacity to meet this requirement. In 2021, KMW produced a modified variant of the AGM, the RCH 155. The RCH 155 has a turret with a significantly lower profile.

=== German selection ===
The German launched a programme for a future wheeled artillery system known as the "Zukünftiges System Indirektes Feuer mittlere Reichweite" (ZukSysIndF mRw, "Future System Indirect Fire Medium Range").

In October 2023, the RCH-155 was mentioned as the winner of the competition, as the option from Rheinmetall (Artillery Truck Interface) was still in development and not yet mature. The target back then was hopefully for 168 systems, realistically the budget was for 120 systems.

In December 2025, the Bundestag voted the budget for a framework agreement for 500 systems, more precisely:

- 4 prototypes (1 for the UK, 3 for Germany)
- Germany:
  - 80 RCH-155 to be ordered in 2025
  - 149 to be ordered in 2026
- 271 available for export at German price condition.

On 13 January 2025, Germany gave the first RCH 155 to Ukraine. KNDS will supply Ukraine with 54 RCH 155 wheeled howitzers, with the first six systems to be delivered in 2025.

== Design ==
=== Special features ===
The RCH 155 is the world's first howitzer that can fire while in motion. This is mainly to avoid enemy counter-artillery fire, as modern counter-battery radars such as COBRA can be used to reconnoitre fire positions after firing in near real-time.

Its traverse and firing controls allow firing the gun at targets in the vicinity, such as an enemy tank, in a direct-fire, rather than indirect artillery mode.

Taken together, quick acquisition of target, direct-fire and "shoot-and-scoot" capabilities mean the RCH 155 could be considered to have a hunter-killer role similar to main battle tanks as it is able to quickly acquire targets in line-of-sight and prosecute them while on the move, or at least moving quickly out afterwards without remaining open to easy counter-fire. This capability, however, is for self-defence and is not its main role.

The RCH 155 is highly automated and is theorised to eventually be capable of operating entirely remotely.

=== RCH 155 tracked LORAS ===
It was presented at Eurosatory 2026, and will start the trials in 2026. The cannon is a new KNDS France system.

== Specifications ==
Parameters	RCH 155 (8×8 - GTK Boxer A3)	RCH-155 Tracked (tracked Boxer)	LORAS (tracked Boxer)
Vehicle characteristics
Length vehicle	7.93 m (26.0 ft)	7.58 m (24.9 ft)	7.58 m (24.9 ft)
Length vehicle + cannon	10.50 m (34.4 ft)	10.60 m (34.8 ft)	11.5 m (38 ft)
Width vehicle	2.99 m (9.8 ft)	3.45 m (11.3 ft)	3.5 m (11 ft)
Height vehicle	2.38 m (7.8 ft)	—	—
Height (turret hull roof)	3.60 m (11.8 ft)	3.50 m (11.5 ft)	3.5 m (11 ft)
Ground clearance	0.50 m (1.6 ft)	0.45 m (1.5 ft)	0.45 m (1.5 ft)
Power train
Combat mass	< 39.0 t (86,000 lb)	< 45.0 t (99,200 lb)	< 45.0 t (99,200 lb)
Engine	MTU 8V199 TE21; Diesel, V8, 15,900 cm^{3} (970 cu in)	MTU 881 Ka-501 CR Diesel, V8, 18,200 cm^{3} (1,110 cu in)	MTU 881 Ka-501 CR; Diesel, V8, 18,200 cm^{3} (1,110 cu in)
Engine power / Torque	820 PS (600 kW); 2,999 N⋅m (2,212 lb⋅ft)	1,090 to 1,200 PS (800 to 880 kW) > 3,340 N⋅m (2,460 lb⋅ft)	1,090 to 1,200 PS (800 to 880 kW) > 3,340 N⋅m (2,460 lb⋅ft)
Power / mass Torque / mass	21 PS/t (15 kW/t); 76.9 N⋅m/t (56.7 lb⋅ft/t)	24.2 to 26.7 PS/t (17.8 to 19.6 kW/t) > 74.2 N⋅m/t (54.7 lb⋅ft/t)	24.2 to 26.7 PS/t (17.8 to 19.6 kW/t) > 74.2 N⋅m/t (54.7 lb⋅ft/t)
Transmission	Allison model HD4800SP (7F / 3R); Automatic, transmitting drive via a RRW3001 angular gearbox, with integrated torque converter and cooling system within the powerpack.	Renk HSWL 256 (6F / 6R) Fully automatic	Renk HSWL 256 (6F / 6R); Fully automatic
Axles	ZF with longitudinal and cross-axle differential locks to give full eight-wheel lock-up if required	—	—
Suspension	Double-wishbone with coil springs and shock-absorbers	Hydropneumatic "In Arm" Horstmann	Hydropneumatic "In Arm" Horstmann
Vehicle performances
Max speed (road)	100 km/h (62 mph)	70 km/h (43 mph)	70 km/h (43 mph)
Range (road)	> 700 km (430 mi)	< 500 km (310 mi)	< 500 km (310 mi)
Max slope / Max lateral lean	60% (31.0°); 30% (16.7°)	— —	— —
Ground clearance /	0.50 m (1.6 ft)	0.45 m (1.5 ft)	0.45 m (1.5 ft)
Step climbing	0.80 m (2.6 ft)	0.80 m (2.6 ft)	0.80 m (2.6 ft)
Trench crossing	2.00 m (6.56 ft)	2.00 m (6.56 ft)	2.00 m (6.56 ft)
Fording (unprepared)	1.20 m (3.9 ft)	1.80 m (5.9 ft)	1.80 m (5.9 ft)
Turning radius	Skid-steering: 7.50 m (24.6 ft); Two steering axles (1st / 2nd): 10.5 m (34 ft)	—	—
Weapon system
Primary weapon	Rheinmetall 155 mm L/52 artillery gun (used on the PzH 2000, AGM, M109-52, Rheinmetall Radhaubitze, Rheinmetall-Elbit Roem)	Rheinmetall 155 mm L/52 artillery gun (used on the PzH 2000, AGM, M109-52, Rheinmetall Radhaubitze, Rheinmetall-Elbit Roem)	KNDS France 155mm L/58
Calibre	155 mm, L/52 (JBMoU-compatible / STANAG 4425 - AOP-29 part 1, NATO-standard)	155 mm, L/52 (JBMoU-compatible / STANAG 4425 - AOP-29 part 1, NATO-standard)	155 mm, L/58 (JBMoU-compatible / STANAG 4425 - AOP-29 part 1, NATO-standard)
Breechblock	Vertical sliding block breech mechanism		
Elevation	-2.5° to +65° (-45 mils to +1,150 mils)		
Traverse	360° (+ / - 200°) (with 6 modular charges without the need of support legs)	360° (without the need of support legs)	360° (without the need of support legs)
Projectile magazine	30 rounds (with their fuse)		
Propellant magazine	144 modular charges (Nitrochemie - DM72 / DM92)		
Loading system	Automatic loading (rounds and propellant charges)		
Secondary weapon	RCWS (optional - chosen by the client nation)		
Crew	2 (1 driver / system operator, 1 commander also operating the optional RCWS); Potential for complete automation		
Electronic systems
Fire control system	Ballistic fire control computer of the PzH 2000 which works as: Input information: positioning date (GPS / INS), targeting data (target position, required number and type of rounds, through an automated command and control system, or introduced manually), landing angle, altitude of the explosion / distance from impact.; Translation elements: NABK software = NATO Armaments Ballistic Kernel, a system for ballistics / trajectory calculation, and firing data, based on point-mass model and modified point mass model of all the rounds, models specific to the rounds / gun combination.; Output: A shooting solution (azimuth and elevation of the cannon, number of charges for each elevation, time span in between rounds and fuse setting).; Note: for the direct fire, no external command required		
Command and control system	Open architecture for the integration to the battlefield management system of the client (target data transmission and command system).		
Stabilisation / Fire control system	MOOG supplies the turret control, stabilisation.		
Navigation / target pointing	INS (inertial navigation): high precision systems such as the SAGEM Sigma 30 or Safran Geonyx INS. Satellite positioning systems: GPS, Galileo which is only complementing the INS.		
Muzzle velocity radar	Weibel MVRS-700C already used with the PzH 2000, and already adapted to the fire control system.		
Fuse programming	Automated fuse programming by an induction system.		
Weapon performances
Shells performances	Shells used with the RCH-155 / PzH 2000: L15A1(HE): 3.4 to 25 km (2.1 to 15.5 mi); DM111 (HE) / DM121 (HE): ≤ 30 km (19 mi); HE-BB: ≤ 40 km (25 mi); V-LAP: ≤ 54 km (34 mi); SMArt 155: ≤ 27.5 km (17.1 mi); Shells in development / qualification for the RCH-155: Vulcano (Munition): Vulcano BER 155: ≤ 50 km (31 mi); Vulcano GPS/SAL 155: ≤ 70 km (43 mi); HE-LR rocket assist: ~ 80 km (50 mi); HE-ExR ramjet: ~ 100 km (62 mi)	Shells used with the RCH-155 / PzH 2000: L15A1(HE): 3.4 to 25 km (2.1 to 15.5 mi); DM111 (HE) / DM121 (HE): ≤ 30 km (19 mi); HE-BB: ≤ 40 km (25 mi); V-LAP: ≤ 54 km (34 mi); SMArt 155: ≤ 27.5 km (17.1 mi); Shells in development / qualification for the RCH-155: Vulcano (Munition): Vulcano BER 155: ≤ 50 km (31 mi); Vulcano GPS/SAL 155: ≤ 70 km (43 mi); HE-LR rocket assist: ~ 80 km (50 mi); HE-ExR ramjet: ~ 100 km (62 mi)	60 km (37 mi) with standard shells 80 to 100 km (50 to 62 mi) with precision and special shells
Rate of fire	8 rounds per minute (for 3 minutes).		
Firing modes	MRSI (Multiple Round Simultaneous Impact) with up to 5 projectiles (landing within a 2-second spread); Capable to fire on the move.; Direct firing capability (with the optronic sensors of the RCWS), up to 1.6 to 1.8 km (0.99 to 1.12 mi).		
Recoil	Maximum load of 60.0 t (132,300 lb)		
Protection
Hull protection	Protection levels: Frontal: STANAG 4569 Level 6 (30 mm AP and APFSDS at 500 m (550 yd) and 155 mm HE round at 10 m (33 ft)); All around: STANAG 4569 Level 4 (14.5 mm AP at 200 m (220 yd) and 155 mm HE round at 25 m (82 ft)); The RCH 155 mission module is separate from the crew.		
Floor protection	IED and mine protection system. Triple-layered floor with AMAP-IED and AMAP-M		
Fire protection	Engine compartment: automatic extinguishing system. Fighting compartment: fire suppression system.		
NBC protection	Reusing the Boxer NBC protection system (cabin overpressure, air filters for the air-conditioning).		
Stealth features	Radar absorbent paint available. Radar / IR stealth through Saab Barracuda camouflage nets.		

== Production ==
Rheinmetall signed a contract in December 2025 for the delivery of the weapon system and the electronic system, worth around €1.2 billion for the 84 first systems ordered by Germany and the UK.

== Operators ==
=== Current operators ===
Qatar (12)
In September 2024, it was reported that Germany has approved the sale of the RCH 155 for Qatar in exchange for 12 PzH 2000, which were transferred to Ukraine.
Ukraine (54)
List of orders of Boxer RCH 155 ordered for the Ukrainian Ground Forces:
- 18 howitzers ordered on 17 September 2022, announced as a purchase from Ukraine through a German aid fund at a cost of €216 million.
- 18 howitzers ordered in February 2024, announced during the Munich Conference for Ukraine support, Germany added 18 additional RCH-155 to the planned support.
- 18 howitzers ordered as per an announcement in June 2024 by KNDS. It was revealed that the total of RCH 155 for Ukraine was increased to a total of 54, which implies that 18 additional RCH-155 had been ordered.
In January 2025, Federal Minister of Defence Boris Pistorius symbolically consigned the first of a total of 54 RCH 155 to the Ukrainian ambassador to Germany, Oleksii Makeiev. The first six of these systems will initially remain in Germany and be used to train Ukrainian soldiers.

=== Future operators ===
Prototypes (4 – 3 for Germany / 1 for the UK)
4 prototypes approved for order and ordered in December 2025 with ARTEC GmbH.
The contract between Germany and the UK for the prototype and the testing was signed in December 2025 for £52 million.
Germany (80)
Framework agreement approved by the German Budget Office for up to 500 RCH-155 in December 2025.
Firm orders:
- 80 in December 2025 (€1 billion), delivery for 2028-2030.
United Kingdom (72)
In April 2024, the UK selected the RCH-155 for the British Army's Mobile Fires Platform programme, as a successor for the AS-90.
Firm orders:
- 72 weapon systems ordered in May 2026 for £1.0 billion (€1.15 billion). The vehicles are likely to be taken from the 100 additional Boxer platforms secured in 2022.
- Additional orders are expected.

=== Potential orders ===
Germany
Sales planned under the framework agreement for 500 systems:
- 149 for Germany in 2026 (€2 billion)
- 267 systems remaining in the framework agreement signed by Germany are planned for German allies, at the same German price conditions.
Netherlands
In August 2024, Armin Papperger, the CEO of Rheinmetall, announced that the Royal Netherlands Army showed interest in the system.
United Kingdom
Planned orders and deliveries
- Around 200–240 could be purchased, which means 128 to 168 additional systems.

=== Failed bids ===
United States
On August 18, 2026, the US Army selected the K9 Thunder Mobile Howitzers (K9MH) variant for a prototype contract.
The competition included among others the RCH-155 (Rheinmetall USA), the AGM-Piranha IV 10×10 AAC (GDLS) the Archer (BAE Bofors), the CAESAR, and the Sigma.

== Similar howitzers ==
- SIGMA 155 – (Israel)
- Archer artillery system – (Sweden)
