= M109 in the Swiss Armed Forces =

The M109, a widely used American howitzer, has been operated by the Swiss Armed Forces since 1971. Under Swiss operation, the M109 has received numerous modernisations, though it is gradually being phased out of service, as its service life is approaching its end.

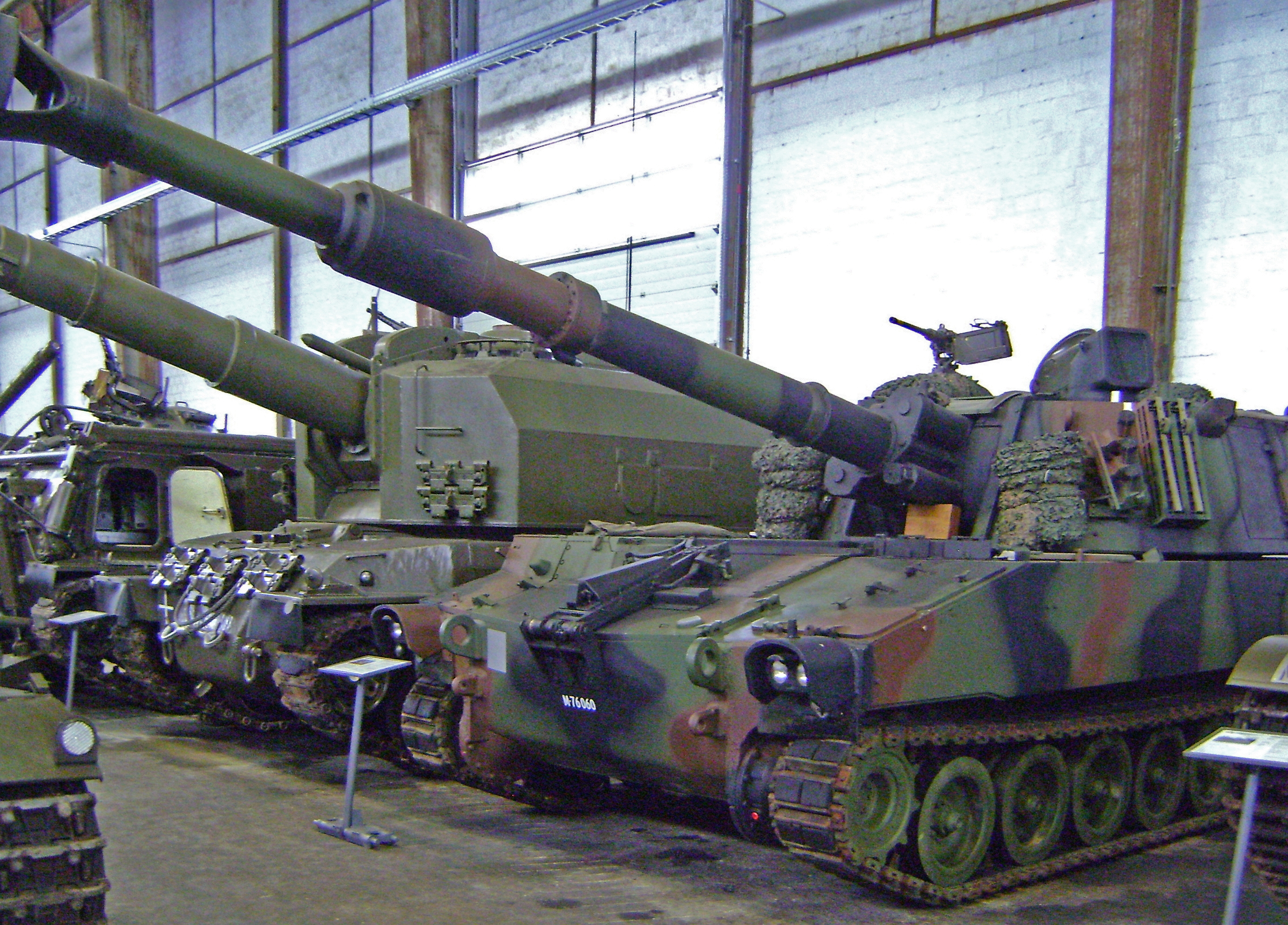
Panzerkanone 68 next to M109

== History ==
During the 1950s, the Swiss Army considered the development of a local self-propelled howitzer. The Eidgenoessische Konstruktionswerkstaette was commissioned to study this possibility.

In 1966, development began on a system based on the Panzer 61 chassis, which would use the 15.5 cm L/42 cannon, have a range of up to 30 km, and fire up to 6 rounds per minute with an automatic loading system. Four systems were manufactured before the program was suspended due to technical difficulties and financial considerations. The M109 was then selected as the future self-propelled howitzer of the Swiss Army.

== Orders and modernisations ==
Over time, a total of 581 M109 were ordered, and today, 133 M-109 KAWEST WE are in service

=== Batch 1 ===
146 Pz Hb 66 ("15.5 cm Panzerhaubitze 66"), purchased with the armament program 1968, and introduced from 1971. This first batch is made of the first generation of M109 with a L-23 calibre cannon.

- First modernisation of the 146 SPH to the standard Pz Hb 66/74 delivered from May 1977 to February 1979. It received the addition of the new L-39 calibre cannon.
- Modernisation of 108 Pz Hb 66/74 to the standard Pz Hb 66/74 SELAN delivered from 1996 to 1998 and retired in 2003.

=== Batch 2 ===
120 Pz Hb 74 ("15.5 cm Panzerhaubitze 74") purchased with the armament program RP 74, and introduced from 1974 to 1978.This batch is made of the M109A1B with a L-39 calibre cannon. All were retired by 2003.

- 33 modernised with the armament program RP 97 to the standard Pz Hb 74/95, also known as Pz Hb KAWEST. The main elements of the modernisation is the L-47 calibre cannon and an automatic loading system.

=== Batch 3 ===
207 Pz Hb 79 ("15.5 cm Panzerhaubitze 79") purchased with the armament program RP 79, introduction from 1981 to 1983. This batch is made of the M109A1B with a L-39 calibre cannon. 182 were retired by 2003.

- 57 modernised with the armament program RP 95 and 150 with the armament program RP 97 to the standard Pz Hb 79/95, also known as Pz Hb KAWEST. The main elements of the modernisation is the L-47 calibre cannon and an automatic loading system.
- 25 of the 207 were modernised with the armament program AEB 2008 to the standard Pz Hb KAWEST WE, introduced from 2009, and currently in service.

=== Batch 4 ===
108 Pz Hb 88 ("15.5 cm Panzerhaubitze 88") purchased with the armament program RP 88, introduction from 1991 to 1992. This batch is made of the M109A1B with a L-39 calibre cannon.

- 108 modernised with the armament program RP 95 to the standard Pz Hb 88/95, also known as Pz Hb KAWEST. The main elements of the modernisation is the L-47 calibre cannon and an automatic loading system.
- 108 modernised with the armament program AEB 2008 to the standard Pz Hb KAWEST WE, introduced from 2009, and currently in service.

== Status of the Swiss M109 ==
=== In use in the Swiss Army as of 2023 ===
133 Pz Hb KAWEST WE are in use, 90 used in five artillery divisions, and 43 used in basic training, 62 were sold to other countries, and few variants remain in museums.

- 25 based on the Pz Hb 79/95 KAWEST
- 108 based on the Pz Hb 88/95 KAWEST

=== Retired ===
- As of 2003, 169 of the PzHb 66/74 and PzHb 74 that were not modernised to the standard KAWEST, neither sold have been retired. Most of those were recycled, with their parts recovered for the remaining M109. Few of those were donated to museums.
- As of 2009, 53 M109 KAWEST were retired and recycled
  - 33 of the Pz Hb 74/95 KAWEST retired and recycled
  - 20 of the Pz Hb 79/95 KAWEST retired and recycled
- As of 2009, 162 of the Pz Hb 79/95 KAWEST that were not retired, neither modernised to the standard KAWEST WE, were mothballed and put in long-term storage as a reserve.
- As of 2021, the 162 Pz Hb 79/95 KAWEST that were in long-term storage were retired and recycled.

=== Sold to other countries ===
- 40 M109 (PzHb 66/74 or 74) were sold to the United Arab Emirates in 2002 - 2004, but those systems were in fact going for the Moroccan Army.
- 24 M109 (PzHb 66/74 or 74) were sold to the Chilean Army in 2004 and then modernised to the standard KAWEST.

== Replacement ==
The armament program "Artillerie Wirkplattform und Wirkmittel 2026" for the replacement of the M109 KAWEST WE is ongoing.

Two systems were shortlisted in 2022, the BAE Archer and the RCH 155 as indicated in the table below.

Potential equipment	Image	Origin	Vehicle base	Quantity	Calibre	In service from
Archer		Sweden; Germany	Rheinmetall HX2 (8×8)	Not public	155 mm L/52	Around 2028 - 2030
RCH 155		Germany	Boxer (8×8)	Not public	155 mm L/52	Around 2028 - 2030
RCH 155		Switzerland; Germany	Piranha IV (10×10)	Not public	155 mm L/52	Around 2028 - 2030

The trials are planned for 2023–2024, and the selection for the successor will take place in 2025. The new self-propelled howitzer should be financed with the Armament Program 2026. The successor should be in service by the beginning of the 2030s.
