= Fox 12 =

Fox 12 may refer to one of the following television stations in the United States affiliated with the Fox Broadcasting Company:

== Current ==
- KEYC-DT2, a digital channel of KEYC-TV in Mankato, Minnesota
- KNRR in Pembina, North Dakota
  - Satellite of KVRR in Fargo, North Dakota
- KPTV in Portland, Oregon
- KXII-DT3, a digital channel of KXII in Sherman, Texas
- WCTI-DT2, a digital channel of WCTI-TV in New Bern, North Carolina

== Former ==
- KTRV-TV in Boise, Idaho (1986–2011)
- KTTM in Huron, South Dakota (1992–2020)
  - Satellite of KTTW in Sioux Falls, South Dakota

== Other uses ==
- Guanylurea dinitramide, an explosive compound also known as FOX-12
