= Mowag Piranha IV =

Piranha IV
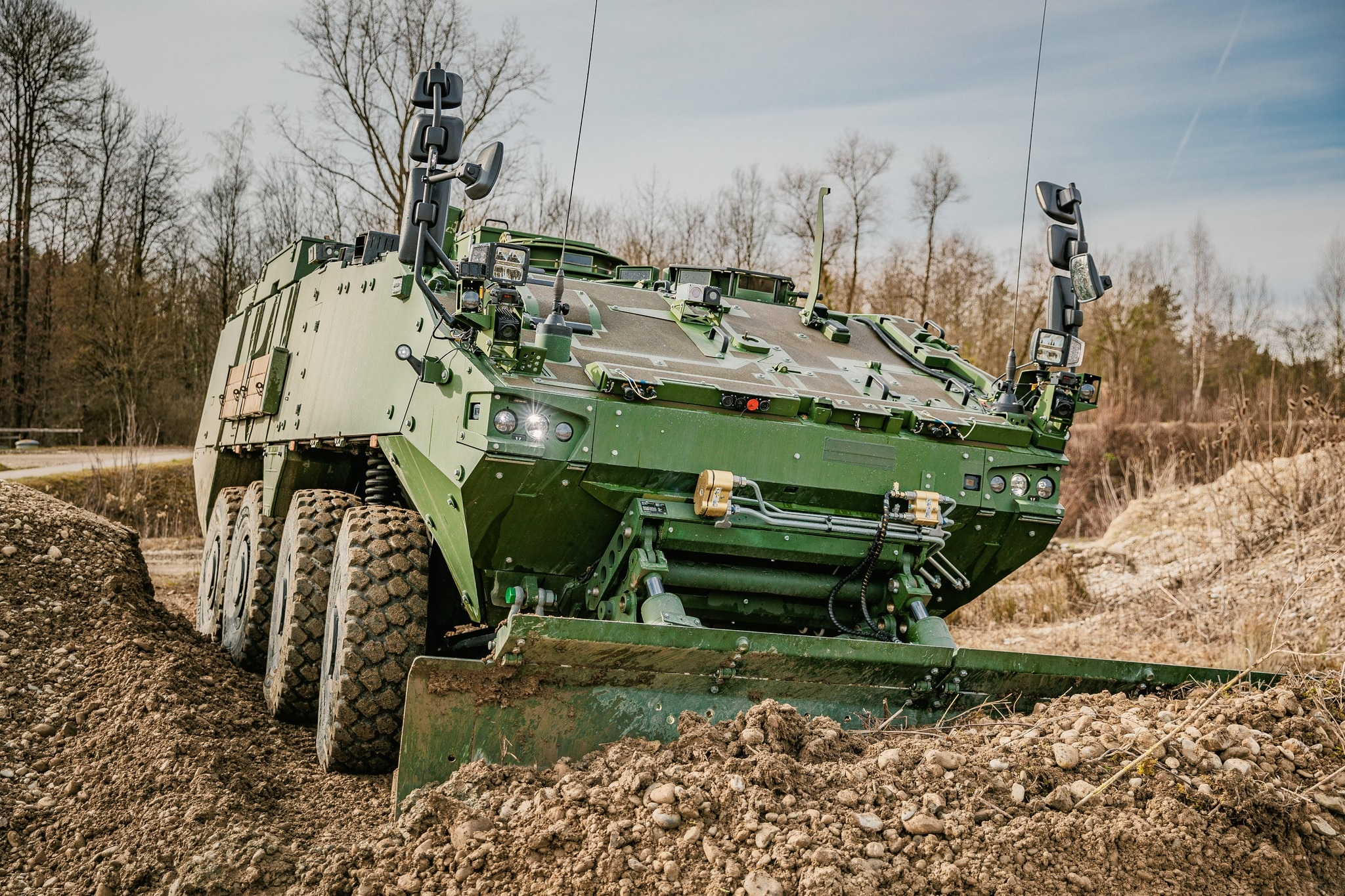
- Swiss Army Piranha IV, known as Pionier Panzerfahrzeug 21, a sapper armoured vehicle
- Type: Armoured fighting vehicle
- Place of origin: Switzerland

Service history
- In service: From 2024
- Used by: Swiss Armed Forces

Production history
- Designed: Prototype revealed in 2001
- Manufacturer: GDELS-Mowag GmbH
- Developed from: Mowag Piranha III
- Developed into: Mowag Piranha V
- Produced: Serial production from 2021
- No. built: 132 ordered (May 2023)

Specifications
- Mass: GVM 25 t (55,000 lb) (15t kerb weight + 10 t payload)
- Length: 7.24 m (285 in)
- Width: 2.80 m (110 in)
- Height: 2.20 m (87 in) for the base variant
- Crew: 3 (+ 6 or 7 passengers)
- Engine: MTU 6V 199TE20; 544 hp (400 kW)
- Power/weight: 21.76 hp/t (16 kW/t)
- Transmission: ZF Ecomat 7HP 902 gearbox, (7 gears front + 1 reverse)
- Suspension: Adjustable height, semi-active, hydro-pneumatic
- Operational range: 750 km (470 mi)
- Maximum speed: 100 km/h (62 mph)

The Piranha IV is the fourth generation of the Piranha family of armoured vehicles by MOWAG GmbH. Its development started in the 2000s as a fully private venture. A first prototype was unveiled in 2001, and a second in 2004. This new version offered an increased volume inside the cabin, and a higher level of protection.

As the Piranha IV was being developed, the ownership of MOWAG changed. It was acquired by General Dynamics in 2004 to become part of General Dynamics European Land Systems.

== History ==
Following the previous version of the Piranha (Piranha III) and its derivatives (LAV III, Stryker), a need for a larger and better protected vehicle arose from the international weapons market.

The solution offered by Mowag was an 8×8 with an internal volume of 12 m^{3} (420 cu ft) (compared to the 11 m^{3} of the Piranha IIIC). Vehicle weight was 25 t (25 long tons; 28 short tons) (18.5 t for the Piranha IIIC). Despite this weight increase, the mobility of the vehicle was improved thanks to a new suspension design and a more powerful engine.

This new generation of the Piranha family triggered the interest of foreign manufacturers. A licence for its production was acquired by Alvis Vickers (which became BAE Systems Platforms & Services) with the intention to manufacture the Piranha IV in the UK and in South Africa. Another licence was acquired by Komatsu which was looking for an 8x8 platform for the "Future Wheeled Combat Vehicle" (Shorai Sorin Sento Sharyo) of the Japanese Ground Self-Defence Force. In the end, neither company manufactured the Piranha IV; the Japanese army selected the Type 16 for the role, and there was never a proper interest by the UK.

In 2007, the UK launched the Future Rapid Effect System (FRES) competition for a heavy multi-role armoured vehicle after cancelling participation in the Boxer collaboration. The British Armed Forces were looking for a much higher protection level than was possible with the Piranha IV. GDELS Mowag therefore presented a new generation of the Piranha family in 2007, the "Piranha Evolution". It was selected for FRES, along with the Boxer and the VBCI for FRES Utility Variant (UV) trials and the Piranha V with General Dynamics UK was chosen as the preferred bidder to develop the Piranha into a vehicle to meet British requirements but the UV requirement was dropped due to budget cuts and the decision reversed. Despite losing the program, GDELS-Mowag developed this variant further into the 33-tonne Piranha V. GDELS-Mowag is able to offer 8×8 armoured vehicles in several weight categories including competing in the heavy category against the Boxer, the VBCI, the Patria AMV, and the Freccia IFV. This enabled the sale of the Piranha V to Denmark, Spain, Romania and Monaco.

== Design ==
One of the main differences with the former Piranha vehicles is the protection level.

- Front armour protection against armoured piercing (AP) ammunition of 20 mm and 23 mm calibre.
- All-around armour protection against 14.5 mm AP ammunition
- All-around armour add-on available to protect against 20 mm/23 mm AP (meeting STANAG 4569 protection level 5
- Floor protection against anti-tank mines and Improvised explosive devices (10 kg TNT equivalent)

== Variants ==
The following vehicles are in service, or in development to enter service.

=== Piranha IV 8×8 ===
==== "12 cm Mörser 16" – Mortar Carrier ====
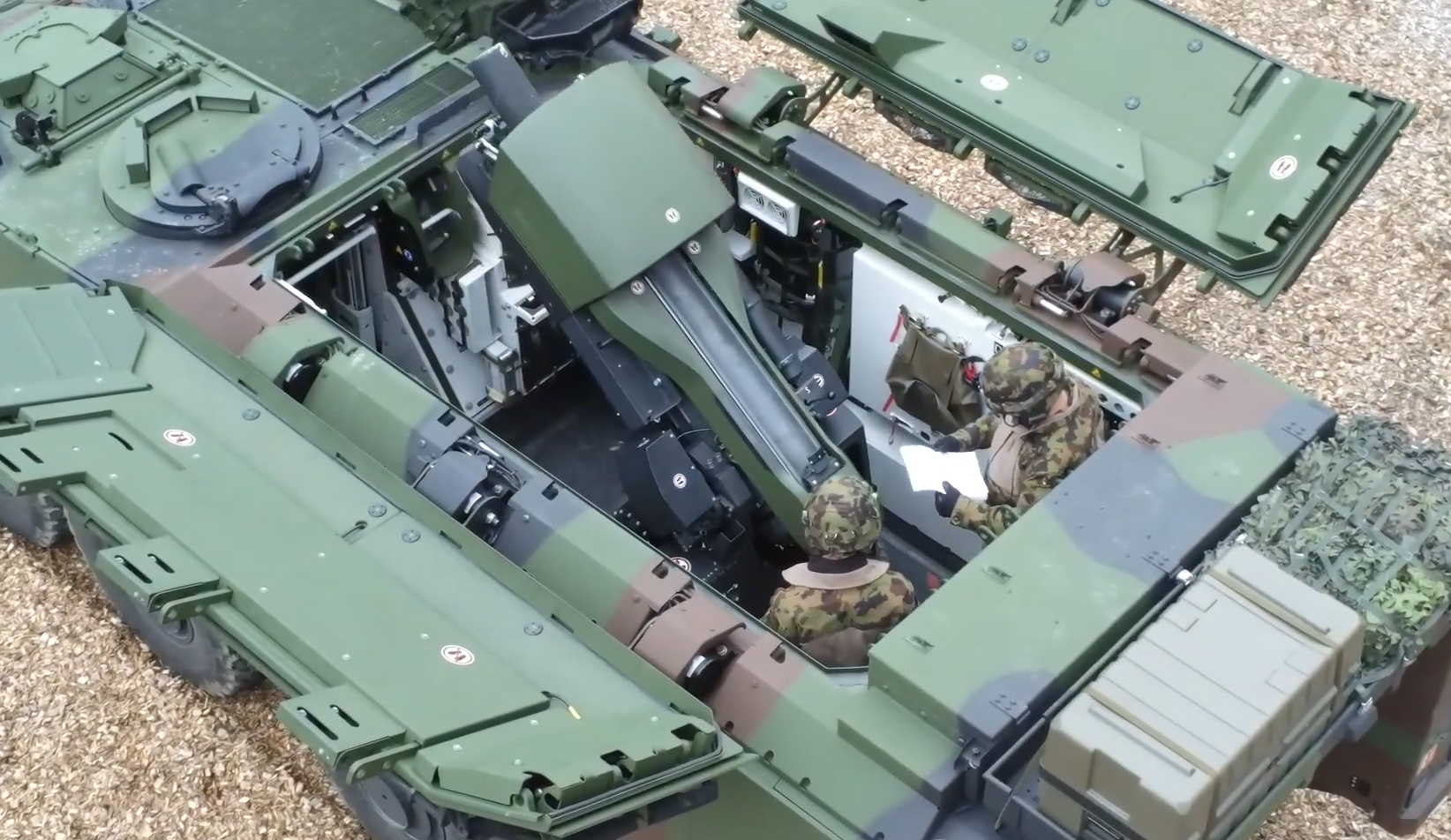
12 cm Mörser 16

The Swiss Army expressed the need for a more mobile heavy mortar system, and evaluated a need for 4 batteries to fulfil its mission. The need for a heavy mortar system arose after the Swiss Government decided to stop using the, "lm fort 12 cm 59/86" (fortress twin-mine launcher 12 cm) and the 15,5 cm Festungskanone 93 (an artillery gun 155mm Caliber L/52). This weapon system was developed for the Swiss Armed Forces, by GDELS Mowag and RUAG. Some of the main elements of its design are:

- Vehicle
  - Piranha IV chassis and running gear
  - Roof opening
  - Space for up to 30 rounds
  - Crew: 1 driver, 1 commander, 2 loaders
- Weapon systems
  - 120 mm RUAG Cobra automated mortar system connected to the "Integrated Artillery Command and Fire Control System" 97/14 - INTAFF TA
  - Protector RWS equipped with a 12.7 mm M2 Browning machine gun

==== "PI PZ 21" (Pionier Panzerfahrzeug 21) – Sapper Vehicle ====
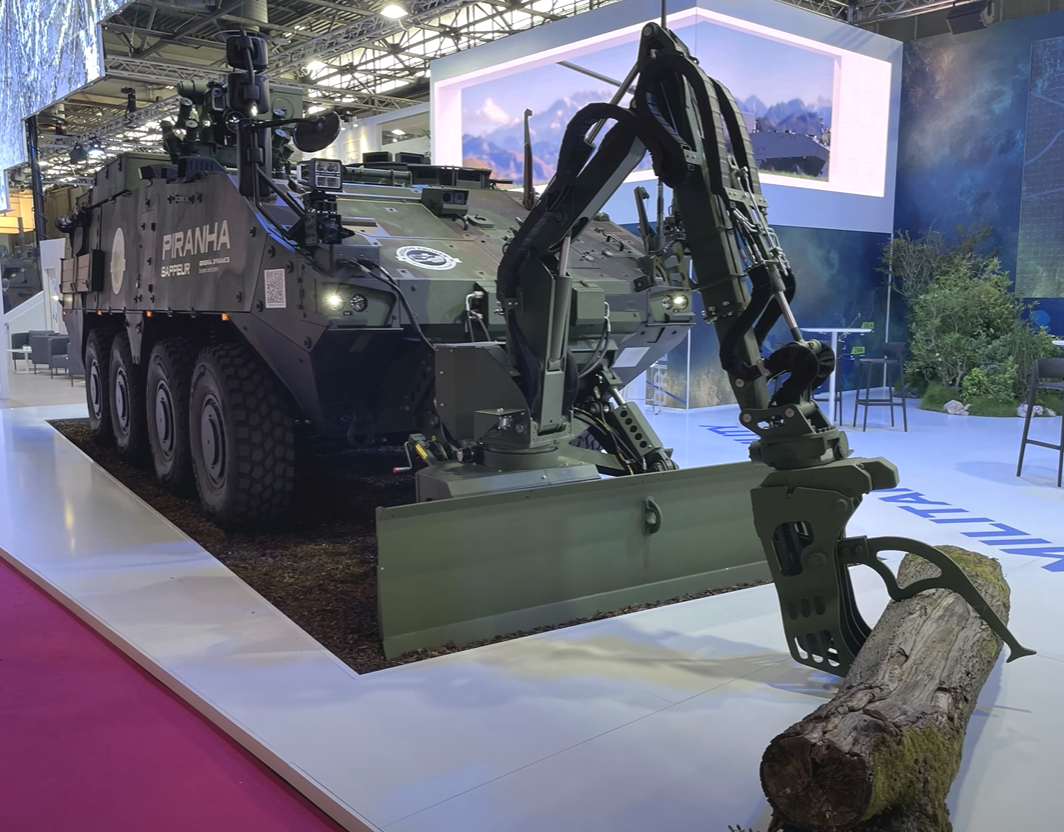
Pionier Panzerfahrzeug 21

As part of the Armament Program 2021, this vehicle was designed to replace the fleet of Minenräumpanzer – M113 63/00, a demining armoured vehicle. In the Swiss Army, the M113 63/00 is not the only sapper vehicle in service. Since 2008, the Kodiak (Leopard 2) was introduced, its mission being to support a heavy assault to breach minefields, trenches, and ditches. The Swiss Army needed therefore a Sapper System complementary to the Kodiak. Moreover, the urbanisation of Switzerland having increased implied that some additional capabilities were needed on top of the demining mission and it would have to be modular to exploit the investment to the fullest.

- The choice for a wheeled platform was justified by a need for a more mobile army.
- The blade was selected to enable the army to open a path where it would be needed (pushing obstacles on a road, covering a trench line, etc)
- The manipulator arm was a need defined from the return on experience of the NATO countries in Afghanistan and Iraq that were the target of an important number of IED attacks. It enables to perform ordnance disposal from a well-protected vehicle. This sapper vehicle was developed for the Swiss Armed Forces, by GDELS Mowag and various subcontractors for the tools. Some of the main elements of its design are:
- Vehicle
  - Standard Piranha IV chassis and running gear
  - Amphibious capacity
  - Crew: 1 driver, 1 commander, 2 sappers
- Weapon system
  - Protector RWS equipped with a 12.7mm M2 Browning machine gun
- Sapper equipment
  - Quick Coupler Adapter (QCA) – provided by Global Clearance Solutions (GCS) System that enables to change rapidly the tools / attachments depending on the mission
  - Mine plough – provided by Pearson Engineering Ltd A mine plough designed to clear the mines laid in surface
  - Combat Bulldozer Blade – provided by GCS
  - Blade Manipulator Arm – provided by GCS A remote manipulator arm used to manipulate in order to identify and treat explosive threats
  - 2 light spots in the front
  - Cameras for the technician and the drive

=== Piranha IV 10×10 ===
==== Piranha "HMC" (Heavy Mission Carrier) ====
The vehicle takes the chassis developed for the RCH-155 mounted variant, and can be fitted for various missions. GDELS announced this variant in April 2024. It is designed for a 17 tons payload, and a total weight of up to 40 tons. The axles 1, 2, 4 and 5 are steered. The turning circle is lower than 18 meters.

==== Piranha AAC (Advanced Artillery Carrier) ====
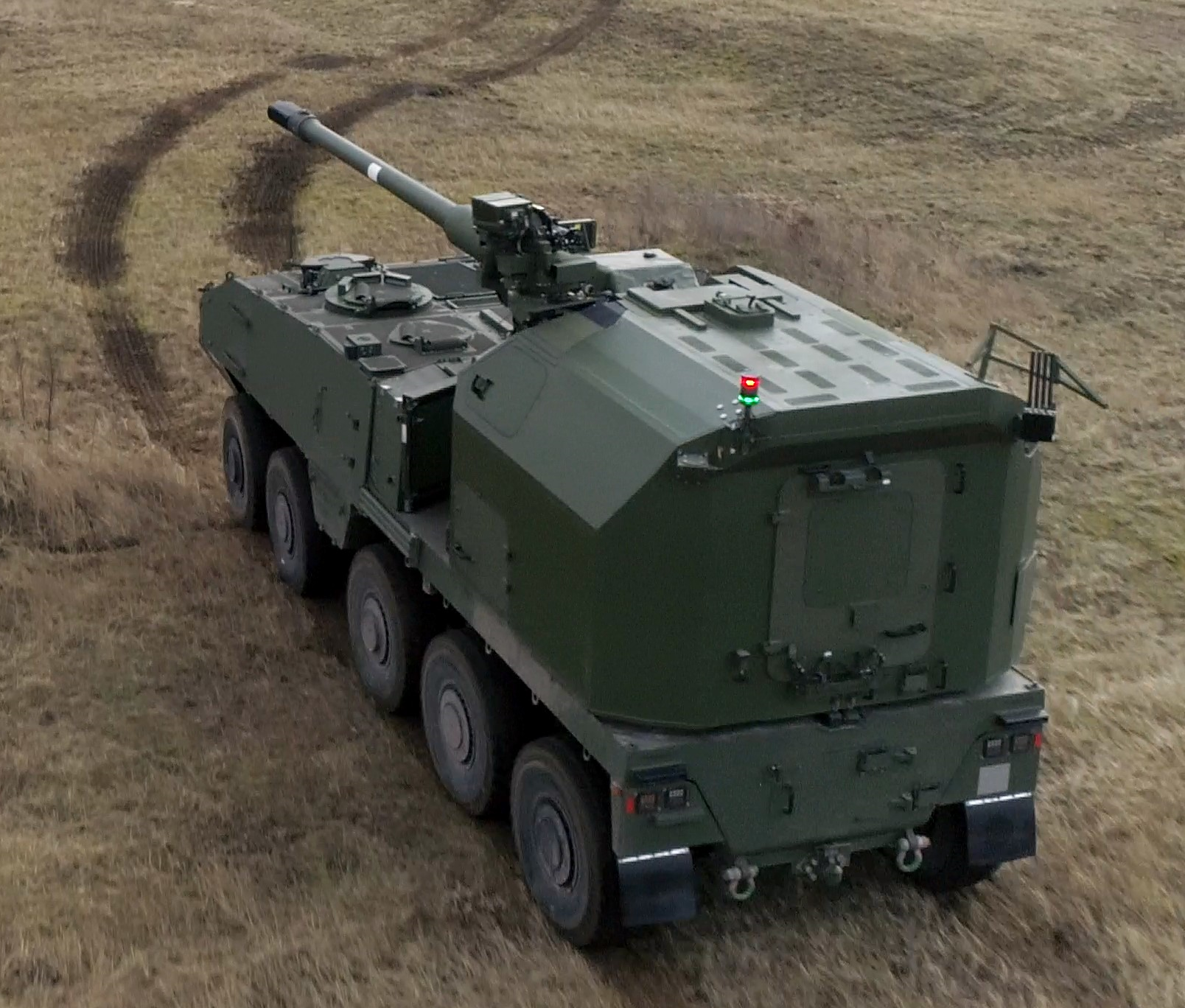
Piranha AAC

The programme "Artillerie Wirkplattform und Wirkmittel 2026" is a Swiss Army project for a successor to its M109 Kawest tracked self-propelled howitzers.

In 2022, two systems were shortlisted for the programme:

- A variant of the Archer Artillery System of BAE Systems Hägglunds, to be based on the RMMV HX2 8×8 chassis (the integration on a truck was being in development for the Swedish Army).
- The KMW RCH 155 (Remote Controlled Howitzer 155) with two chassis options:
  - Boxer A3 (8×8)
  - Piranha IV 10×10 which at the time of the bid would have to be developed GDELS Mowag collaborated with KMW to develop the Piranha variant. The advantage of this variant is to provide more space for the crew, more stability, and the capacity to shoot at full power at 360°. In November 2024,, the Swiss Armed Forces selected the RCH-155 artillery system. The Armed forces started to prepare the contracts for approval by the parliament, and to integrate the command and communication system into the platform.

==== Piranha HMC ARV (Advanced Recovery Vehicle) ====
The system was presented at Eurosatory 2026. The base is the Piranha IV 10×10 HMC, equipped with a recovery module from FFG (Flensburger Fahrzeugbau). It is equipped with a 32-tons crane, and two winches.

== Procurement ==
=== Switzerland (132) ===
==== 48 Piranha IV – 12 cm Mörser 16 ====
- Armament Program 2016 – 32 Piranha IV Mortar Carriers:
  - Budget for this program amounts to CHF 404 million (4 batteries with 8 Piranha IV each)
  - The Budget in the program also includes funds for:
    - 12 armoured trucks for the logistics dedicated to the mortar batteries
    - 36 12 cm mortar ammunition containers
- Extraordinary order in August 2022 – 16 Piranha IV Mortar Carriers. This order came as a reaction to the Russian invasion of Ukraine in 2022:
  - Budget for this program amounts to CHF 175 million (2 batteries with 8 Piranha IV each)
- Entry in service in the army planned in 2025 It was initially planned from 2018 to 2022, but some design flaws delayed the program (such as the roof not being waterproof). After having resolved the flaws and successfully passed the trials by the troops in the spring of 2020, the serial production was approved in February 2021.

==== 84 Piranha IV – PI PZ 21 (Pionier Panzerfahrzeug 21) ====
- Armament Program 2021 – 60 Piranha IV Pioneer Vehicles ordered:
  - Budget for this program amounts to CHF 360 million
  - Contract between GDELS Mowag and Armasuisse signed on 2 May 2022
  - It includes:
    - 60 combat dozer blades
    - 24 remote manipulator arms
    - 12 mine ploughs
- Armament Program 2023 – 24 Piranha IV Pioneer vehicles ordered:
  - Budget for this purchase amounts to CHF 217 million
- Service life: arrival in the army planned in 2025, with an expected service life from 2026 to 2055

==== Piranha IV 10×10 - Piranha AAC (Advanced Artillery Carrier) ====
In November 2024,, as port of the programme Artillerie "Wirkplattform und Wirkmittel 2026", the Swiss Armed Forces selected the RCH-155 artillery system (competing against the Archer and against the RCH-155 on Boxer 8×8). The Armed forces are preparing the contracts for approval by the parliament, and to integrate the command and communication system into the platform.

The contract was signed in June 2026, and includes 32 systems to be produced from 2031, 1 prototype to go through qualifications from 2027, and 32 reloading containers.

== Operators summary ==
=== Successful bids ===
Swiss Army (165 vehicles)
- 48 Piranha IV - 12 cm Mörser 16 (mortar carrier)
- 84 Piranha IV - PI PZ 21 (combat engineer vehicle)
- 32 Piranha IV 10×10 - AAC (Advanced Artillery Carrier)1 Piranha IV 10×10 - AAC prototype

=== Failed bids ===
Japan Ground Self-Defense Force
Komatsu proposed the Piranha IV for the Future Wheeled Combat Vehicle Program (Shorai Sorin Sento Sharyo). The competition was lost against the Type 16 Manoeuvre Combat Vehicle (Hitoroku shiki kidō sentōsha) developed by Mitsubishi Heavy Industries.
(Poland) Polish Army
In 2002, Poland selected the future multi-role vehicle intended to replace the OT-64 SKOT, the BMP-1, some command vehicles, mortar carriers and some armoured engineering vehicles. The competitor for this contract were the Piranha IV, the Pandur 2 (8×8) and the Patria AMV. This last one won the competition, and has been manufactured in Poland under the name KTO Rosomak.
Royal Netherlands Army
RDM Technology received a licence from Mowag to manufacture the Piranha IV for the Dutch Army. RDM offered the Piranha as a competitor to the Boxer in 2000 as a replacement option of the M577 and the YPR-765.
Spanish Army (> 86)
The Spanish Army and the Marine Corps are looking for a successor to the M109A5. The programme has a pre-financing budget of €3 billion will be received, and a budget of €300 million is given for that programme in 2025. This includes a wheeled (86 units) and a tracked self-propelled howitzer (128 units). One of the requirement mentions that the system has to be capable to be used in anti-ship operations, with moving targets. The other requirement include a 155mm L/47 to L/52 with a 40 km range minimum with base-bleed munitions. The Piranha Advanced Artillery Carrier (Piranha IV 10×10) using the AGM is the likely winner, while the tracked variant would use the same artillery system, the GDELS Nemesis (based on the ASCOD 2).
Spain selected the competitor Indra EM&E, who will go forard with the Korean K9 howitzer.
United States Army (> 86)
On August 18, 2026, the US Army selected the K9 Thunder Mobile Howitzers (K9MH) variant for a prototype contract.
The US Army was evaluating several contenders for the new SPH of the US Army. GDLS offers the AGM based on the Piranha IV 10×10 or the ASCOD 2 (known as the Nemesis).
Competitors also included the RCH-155 (Rheinmetall USA), the SIGMA 155 (Elbit and Rheinmetall), the Caesar (KNDS France and Leonardo DRS) and the Archer (BAE Bofors).
