= Ammonium dinitramide =

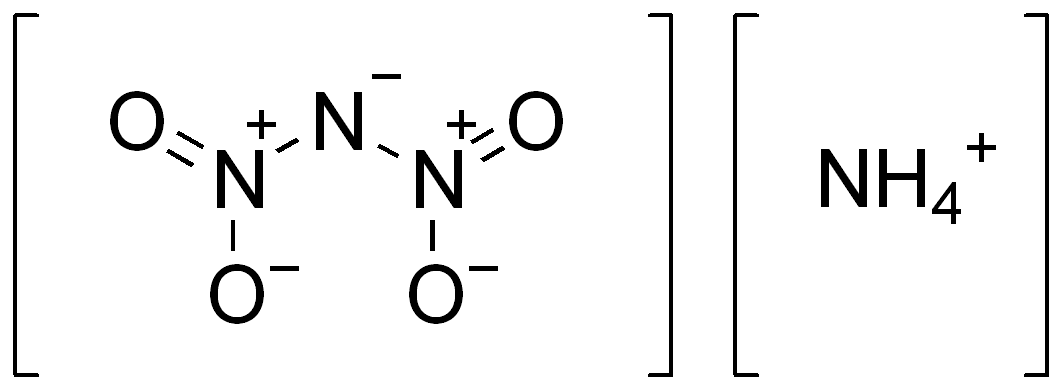

Names
- IUPAC name Azanium dinitroazanide
- Other names: Ammonium dinitroazanide; Ammonium dinitramide

Identifiers
CAS Number	140456-78-6
3D model (JSmol)	Interactive image
ChemSpider	8394920
ECHA InfoCard	100.126.585
EC Number	604-184-9
PubChem CID	10219428
UNII	8JCB80Q5K1
CompTox Dashboard (EPA)	DTXSID80161401
- InChI: InChI=1S/N3O4.H3N/c4-2(5)1-3(6)7;/h;1H3/q-1;/p+1 Key: BRUFJXUJQKYQHA-UHFFFAOYSA-O; InChI=1/N3O4.H3N/c4-2(5)1-3(6)7;/h;1H3/q-1;/p+1 Key: BRUFJXUJQKYQHA-IKLDFBCSAM
- SMILES: [NH4+].[N-]([N+](=O)[O-])[N+](=O)[O-]

Properties
Chemical formula	[NH_{4}][N(NO_{2})_{2}]
Molar mass	124.056 g·mol^{−1}
Density	1.81 g/cm^{3}
Melting point	93 °C (199 °F; 366 K)
Boiling point	127 °C (261 °F; 400 K) (decomposes)

Structure
Lattice constant	a = 6.914 Å, b = 11.787 Å, c = 5.614 Å α = 90.00°, β = 100.40°, γ = 90.00°
Formula units (Z)	4

Thermochemistry
Std enthalpy of formation (Δ_{f}H^{⦵}_{298})	−148 kJ⋅mol^{−1}
Gibbs free energy (Δ_{f}G^{⦵})	−150.6 kJ⋅mol^{−1}

Explosive data
Shock sensitivity	Low
Friction sensitivity	Low

Hazards
- GHS labelling
Pictograms	(GHS01: Explosive) (GHS02: Flammable) (GHS07: Exclamation mark) (GHS08: Health hazard)
Signal word	Danger
Hazard statements	H201, H228, H302, H371
Precautionary statements	P210, P230, P240, P241, P250, P260, P264, P270, P280, P301+P312, P309+P311, P330, P370+P378, P370+P380, P372, P373, P401, P405, P501

Related compounds
Other cations	Guanylurea dinitramide
- Except where otherwise noted, data are given for materials in their standard state (at 25 °C [77 °F], 100 kPa). verify (what is ?) Infobox references

Ammonium dinitramide (ADN) is an inorganic compound with the chemical formula [NH_{4}][N(NO_{2})_{2}]. It is the ammonium salt of dinitraminic acid HN(NO_{2})_{2}. It consists of ammonium cations [NH_{4}]^{+} and dinitramide anions ^{−}N(NO_{2})_{2}. ADN decomposes under heat to leave only nitrogen, oxygen, and water.

It makes an excellent solid rocket oxidizer with a slightly higher specific impulse (ISP) than ammonium perchlorate and, more importantly, does not leave corrosive hydrogen chloride fumes. This property is also of military interest because halogen-free smoke is harder to detect. It decomposes into low-molecular-mass gases, which contributes to higher performance without creating excessive temperatures if used in gun or rocket propellants. However, the dinitramide salt is more prone to detonation under high temperatures and shock compared with the perchlorate.

An ADN-based monopropellant FLP-106 is reported to have improved properties higher performance (ISP of 259 s vs. 252 s) and density (1.362 g/cm^{3} vs. (1.240 g/cm^{3}).

== History ==
Ammonium dinitramide was invented in 1971 at the Zelinsky Institute of Organic Chemistry in the USSR. Initially all information related to this compound was classified because of its use as a rocket propellant, particularly in Topol-M intercontinental ballistic missiles. In 1989 ammonium dinitramide was independently synthesized at SRI International. SRI obtained US and international patents for ADN in the mid-1990s, at which time scientists from the former Soviet Union revealed that they had discovered ADN 18 years earlier.

== Propellant mixtures ==
ADN can be mixed with conventional propellants such as nitrocellulose to improve its oxygen balance. One of the challenges of using ADN is its hygroscopicity. Hu et al. have investigated the possibility of reducing the hygroscopicity of ADN by co-crystallization with 3,4-diaminofurazan.

There is also interest in using ADN to make liquid monopropellants. When ADN is co-crystalized with a crown ether (18C6), the hygroscopicity is greatly reduced, but so is its performance as an explosive. ADN was mixed with amine nitrates in order to lower its melting point for use as a liquid monopropellant. The onset temperature for ADN was essentially unchanged, but some cross-reaction with the amine nitrates was observed. Kim et al. have also examined mixtures of ADN with hydrogen peroxide as a potential liquid monopropellant.

== Preparation ==
There are at least 20 different synthesis routes that produce ammonium dinitramide. In the laboratory ammonium dinitramide can be prepared by nitration of sulfamic acid or its salts (here sodium sulfamate) at low temperatures in the presence of concentrated sulfuric acid, followed by neutralization of the intermediate dinitramidic acid (HN(NO_{2})_{2}) with ammonia:

NaSO_{3}NH_{2} + 2 HNO_{3} → NaHSO_{4} + HN(NO_{2})_{2} + H_{2}O
HN(NO_{2})_{2} + NH_{3} → [NH_{4}][N(NO_{2})_{2}]

The process is performed under red light, since the compound is decomposed by higher-energy photons. An improvement of this method instead synthesizes Guanylurea dinitramide (FOX-12) as a starting point, reacts this with potassium hydroxide (KOH) to form a potassium dinitramide (KDN), and finally produces ammonium dinitramide via salt metathesis reaction of KDN with ammonium sulfate.

Other sources report ammonium synthesis from ammonium nitrate, anhydrous nitric acid, and fuming sulfuric acid (oleum) containing 20% free sulfur trioxide. A base other than ammonia must be added before the acid dinitramide decomposes. The final product is obtained by fractional crystallization.

Another synthesis known as the urethane synthesis method requires four synthesis steps and results in a yield of up to 60%. Ethyl carbamate is nitrated with nitric acid:

CH_{3}CH_{2}−O−C(=O)−NH_{2} + HNO_{3} → CH_{3}CH_{2}−O−C(=O)−NH−NO_{2} + H_{2}O

and then reacted with ammonia to form the ammonium salt of N-nitrourethane:

CH_{3}CH_{2}−O−C(=O)−NH−NO_{2} + NH_{3} → [CH_{3}CH_{2}−O−C(=O)−N^{−}−NO_{2}][NH^{+}_{4}]

This is nitrated again with nitrogen pentoxide to form ethyl dinitrocarbamate and ammonium nitrate:

[CH_{3}CH_{2}−O−C(=O)−N^{−}−NO_{2}][NH^{+}_{4}] + O(NO_{2})_{2} → CH_{3}CH_{2}−O−C(=O)−N(NO_{2})_{2} + [NH_{4}]^{+}NO^{−}_{3}

Finally, treatment with ammonia again splits off the desired ammonium dinitramide and regenerates the urethane starting material:

CH_{3}CH_{2}−O−C(=O)−N(NO_{2})_{2} + 2 NH_{3} → CH_{3}CH_{2}−O−C(=O)−NH_{2} + [NH^{+}_{4}][^{−}N(NO_{2})_{2}]
