= SIGMA 155 =

Israeli self-propelled howitzer

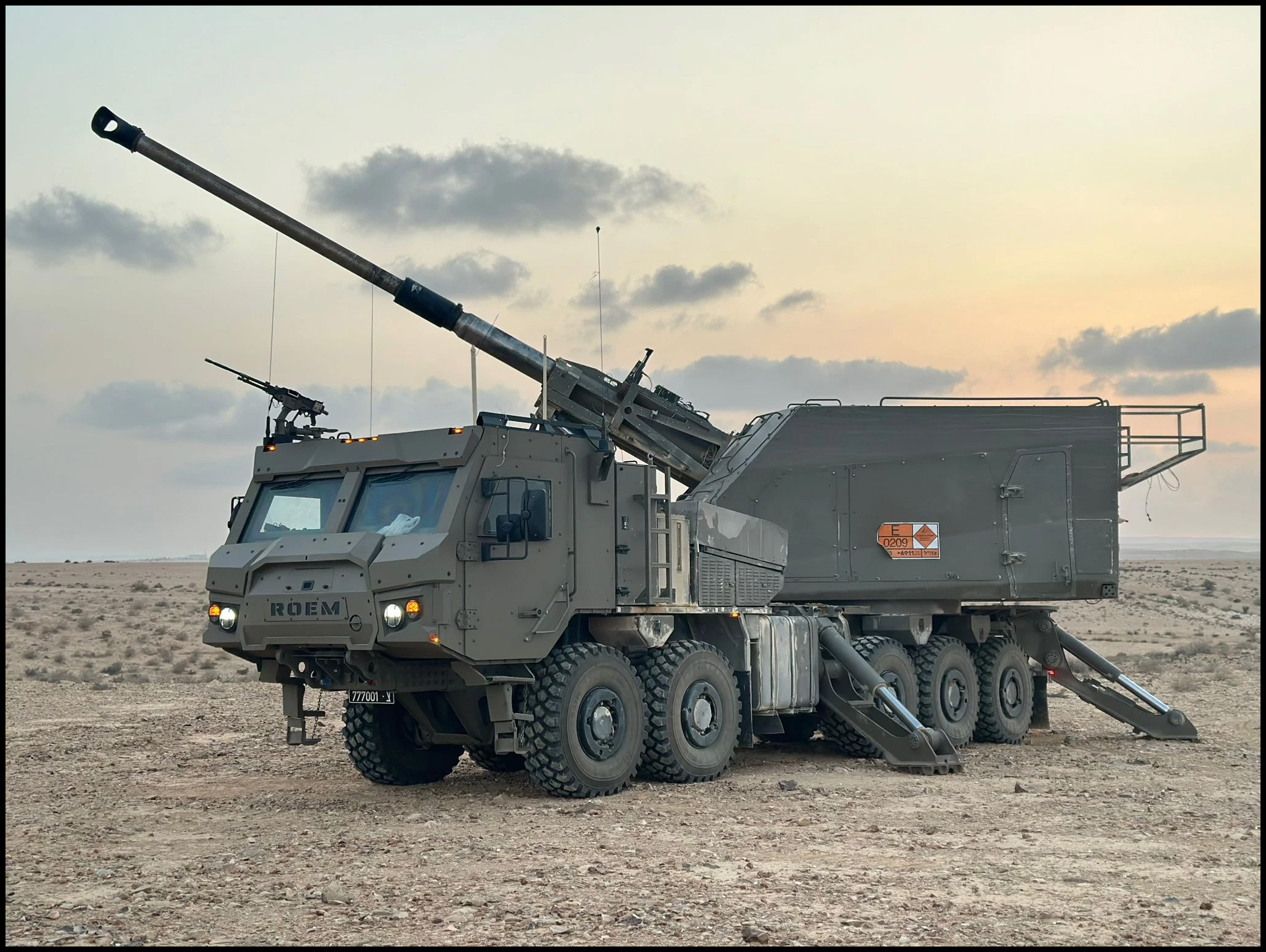
- A SIGMA 155 "Roem" system
- Type: Self-propelled howitzer
- Place of origin: Israel

Service history
- In service: 2025-present

Production history
- Manufacturer: Elbit Systems

Specifications
- Crew: 3
- Caliber: 155 mm (6.1 in)
- Maximum firing range: >40 km (25 mi) (Base variant) >80 km (50 mi) (Export variant)

The SIGMA 155 or Ro'em (Thunder) is a 155mm self-propelled howitzer manufactured by the Israeli defense company Elbit Systems being introduced into service in the Israel Defense Forces. It is slated to replace the M109 howitzer as the IDF's principal artillery system. The variant designed for Israeli use is the Ro'em, while the export variant is known as SIGMA. Both Ro'em and SIGMA are produced by Elbit America in Charleston, South Carolina.

== History ==
The SIGMA 155 saw its first operational firing by IDF gunners in June 2024. In October 2024, the SIGMA 155 was shown in public at the AUSA 2024 convention. In December 2025, the first unit was delivered to the IDF. It is expected to be in IDF service for at least 50 years.

The SIGMA 155 made its combat debut in April 2026 during the 2026 Lebanon war, when the IDF's 282nd Artillery Regiment employed it to strike rocket and anti-tank launching positions.

On October 2, 2026, Singapore revealed that it has acquired the SIGMA 155 after displaying one at a parade marking the 50th anniversary of the 6th Singapore Division.

== Design ==
The SIGMA 155 consists of a 155mm L52 cannon mounted on an Oshkosh 10x10 LVSR based truck with a modified chassis, including an armored cabin to protect the crew. The modified truck is specially designed for SIGMA and called the Mobile Artillery Platform (MAP). The turret is remotely controlled, and the selection of ammunition rounds, loading, and gun laying functions are fully automated. The crew can conduct all firing operations from inside the cabin. The system is capable of firing eight rounds per minute, and can fire shells sequentially at different trajectories for a salvo effect. It can carry up to 40 rounds.

The system can transition from travel to fire mode in one minute. During firing, hydraulically operated spades deploy on each side of the chassis to stabilize the vehicle and they retract after firing. The SIGMA 155 Ro'em has a firing range of 40 kilometers (25 miles). The variant designed for the export market is planned to have a firing range of 80 kilometers (50 miles).

The SIGMA 155 system is designed for a crew of three: the mission commander, gunner, and driver.

== Operators ==
- Israel
- Singapore: To eventually replace the SSPH Primus and FH-2000.

== Similar howitzers ==
- RCH 155 – (Germany)
- Archer artillery system – (Sweden)
