= Guanylurea dinitramide =

Novel insensitive high explosive

Names
- Other names: N-Guanylurea-dinitramide; Fox-12; GUDN

Identifiers
CAS Number	217464-38-5
3D model (JSmol)	Interactive image
PubChem CID	71566590
- InChI: InChI=1S/C2H6N4O.HN3O4/c3-1(4)6-2(5)7;4-2(5)1-3(6)7/h(H6,3,4,5,6,7);1H Key: XDTNINJPSXHCLO-UHFFFAOYSA-N
- SMILES: C(=NC(=O)N)(N)N.N([N+](=O)[O-])[N+](=O)[O-]

Properties
Chemical formula	C_{2}H_{7}N_{7}O_{5}
Molar mass	209.122 g·mol^{−1}
Appearance	White crystalline powder
Density	1.760 g cm^{−3}

Explosive data
Detonation velocity	8235 m/s

Hazards
- Occupational safety and health (OHS/OSH)
Main hazards	Explosive
- Except where otherwise noted, data are given for materials in their standard state (at 25 °C [77 °F], 100 kPa). Infobox references

Guanylurea dinitramide (FOX-12 or GUDN) is a novel insensitive high explosive.

== History ==
GUDN was discovered by Abraham Langlet, a chemist at the Swedish Defence Research Agency, and patented in 1997. The moniker FOX-12 stems from the Swedish-language acronym for the Agency, FOI, plus x for "explosive."

== Applications ==
GUDN is particularly valued for its extreme stability and insensitivity.

GUDN found its first major application when mixed with oxidizers such as potassium nitrate or copper nitrate in automotive airbag inflators.

=== Propellant ===
GUDN is also used in a 60/40 mix with RDX as a propellant in the UNIFLEX 2 IM modular artillery charge system fielded in the BAE 155mm/L52 Archer howitzer.

=== Explosive ===
Blended in equal parts with TNT, GUDN forms the a melt-castable explosive known as GUNTOL. A variation adding 15% Aluminum is known as GUNTONAL.

== Explosive character ==
Upon detonation, GUDN undergoes a thermal decomposition which is not entirely understood as of 2021. The calculated detonation velocity is 8235 m/s, with a detonation pressure of 25.89 GPa, and a detonation temperature of 2887 K.

== Synthesis ==
GUDN is synthesized by a reaction of ammonium dinitramide and the sulfate salt of guanylurea.

== See also ==
- FOX-7, another high explosive developed by the Swedish Defense Research Agency
