= SAGEM Sigma 30 =

The Sigma 30 is an inertial navigation system produced by SAGEM for use with artillery applications including howitzers, multiple rocket launchers, mortars and light guns. It is currently produced for more than 40 international programs, including France (CAESAR, 2R2M, M270 MLRS), Serbia (Nora B 52), Sweden (FH77 BD, Archer), Germany (PzH2000, M270 MLRS), Italy (M270 MLRS), India (Pinaka MBRL), Polish PT-91M tank (build for Malaysia), and the United States (topographic survey).

Sigma 30 can also be integrated in more complex systems (Positioning and Azimuth Determination System).
