= Archer artillery system =

Swedish self-propelled howitzer

Archer
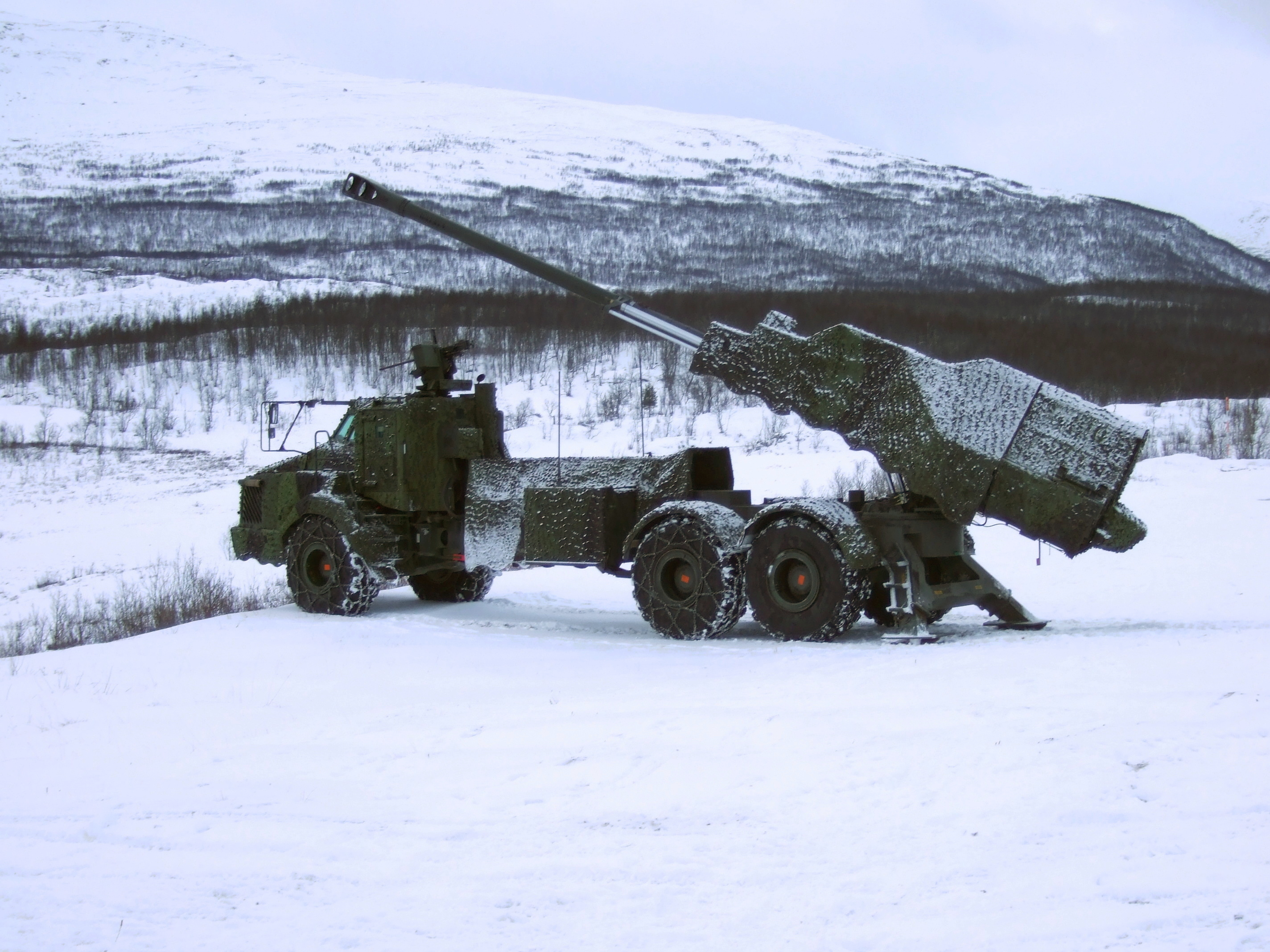
- A deployed Archer
- Type: Wheeled self-propelled howitzer
- Place of origin: Sweden

Service history
- In service: Since 2016
- Used by: Operators
- Wars: Russian invasion of Ukraine

Production history
- Designer: Bofors
- Designed: 1995–2009
- Manufacturer: BAE Systems AB
- Unit cost: US$4.5M (2010) (Note: Unit cost is based on the 2010 US$216 million contract for 48 systems.); US$10.4M (2023) (Note: Unit cost is based on the 2023 US$500 million contract for 48 systems.)
- Produced: Since 2010
- No. built: Volvo A30: 48; RMMV HX2: 4 (+80 on order)

Specifications (See technical data)
- Caliber: 155 mm
- Main armament: FH77 derived howitzer
- References: Janes

The Archer artillery system, or Archer – FH77 BW L52, or Artillerisystem 08, is a Swedish self-propelled howitzer system. The main piece of the system is a fully automated 155 mm L52 (52-calibre-long) gun-howitzer and a M151 Protector remote-controlled weapon station mounted on a modified 6×6 chassis of the Volvo A30D all-terrain articulated hauler. The crew and engine compartment is armoured and the cab is fitted with bullet and fragmentation-resistant windows. The system also includes an ammunition resupply vehicle, a support vehicle, BONUS submunitions, and M982 Excalibur guided projectiles.

The howitzer's superior attack range and exceptional maneuverability makes it ideal for counter-battery fire.

== Development ==
The project began in 1995 as earlier studies for a self-propelled system based on the existing FH77 howitzer. Further test systems received the designation FH77 BD and FH77 BW. By 2004, two prototypes had been ordered based on a lengthened version of the FH77B mounted on a modified Volvo Construction Equipment A30D six-wheel drive articulated haul truck.

In September 2006, BAE Systems Bofors received a SEK 40 million contract from the FMV (Försvarets materielverk, Swedish Defence Materiel Administration) for detailed design work on the Archer program.

In 2008, Sweden ordered a first batch of seven units, while Norway ordered one. In August 2009, Norway and Sweden ordered 24 Archers each, in a cooperative deal.

The howitzer was developed for the Swedish Armed Forces following a contract awarded to Bofors (now BAE Systems Bofors) in 2003 by Försvarets Materielverk (FMV), the Swedish defence acquisition agency to build two demonstrator howitzers. The prototype FH77 BW L52 self-propelled howitzers entered firing trials in Sweden in 2005 and 2006. In September 2006, the FMV placed a contract for detailed design work on Archer and, in January 2007, a contract for the next development phase. The Swedish Army had a requirement for 24 systems (two battalions). In September 2008, the Swedish government approved the final development and procurement of the Archer artillery system.

In November 2008, Sweden and Norway signed a co-operative agreement for the development of the Archer system and, in January 2009, awarded BAE Systems a contract to complete development of the artillery system with the exception of the remote weapon system which is made by Kongsberg Defence & Aerospace. A final prototype was scheduled for completion by September 2009, which was expected to be followed by a contract for 48 systems – 24 for Sweden and 24 for Norway. Archer was planned to enter service in 2011 but was delayed until October 2013. This was because of unforeseen technical problems. It caused the Norwegian government to withdraw from the project in December 2013.

The Swedish Army received its first four pre-serial production FH77 BW L52 Archer systems on 23 September 2013, and the first guns finally entered service on 1 February 2016.

In 2019, a new configuration of the Archer, with the howitzer mounted on a RMMV HX2 8×8 tactical truck, was revealed. Sweden had ordered a number of HX2 trucks in 2014, with deliveries commencing in 2017. On 23 January 2020, Janes Information Services reported that BAE Systems Bofors had begun trials for the HX2 variant. The first Archer of this configuration was delivered to FMV in April 2026.

== Design ==
=== Vehicles ===
==== Operational vehicle platform – Volvo A30D ====
This vehicle platform is a modification of the Volvo A30D 6×6 articulated all-terrain hauler vehicle. It was developed for the first variant of the Archer artillery system. Operators control the entire gun system in any weather from the safety of the armoured vehicle cabin which is fitted with bullet and fragmentation-proof windows. The cabin seats up to four personnel. The howitzer is operated by three or four crew but can be run by a single operator.

The system also includes a munition carrier consisting of a removable, modified standard container mounted on a ballistic-proofed all-terrain lorry. As per the agreement announced in March 2010, the contract to commence the serial production of 48 Archers was signed for US$200 million, resulting in a unit cost of US$4.17 million.

24 Archer were upgraded to the C-standard by November 2025. The upgrades improve the reliability of the system, and include a new command system. This upgraded variant is also compatible to be used on new platforms.

==== Operational vehicle platform – RMMV HX2 8×8 ====
The RMMV HX2 8×8 (HX44M) is the second platform for which the Archer artillery system is being developed. The Swedish Army ordered 48 in September 2023 for US$500 million. The delivery is planned to start from 2025. There are no changes to the system mentioned other than its adaptation to the vehicle.

The first units were delivered to the Swedish FMV on 21 April 2026. The first delivery to the Swedish Army took place the 26 August 2026.

==== Potential vehicle platform – Oshkosh defence trucks ====
BAE Bofors is proposing this system as an option to the US military, and concept variants based on the Oshkosh HEMTT (8×8) or the Oshkosh PLS (10×10).

=== Ammunition ===
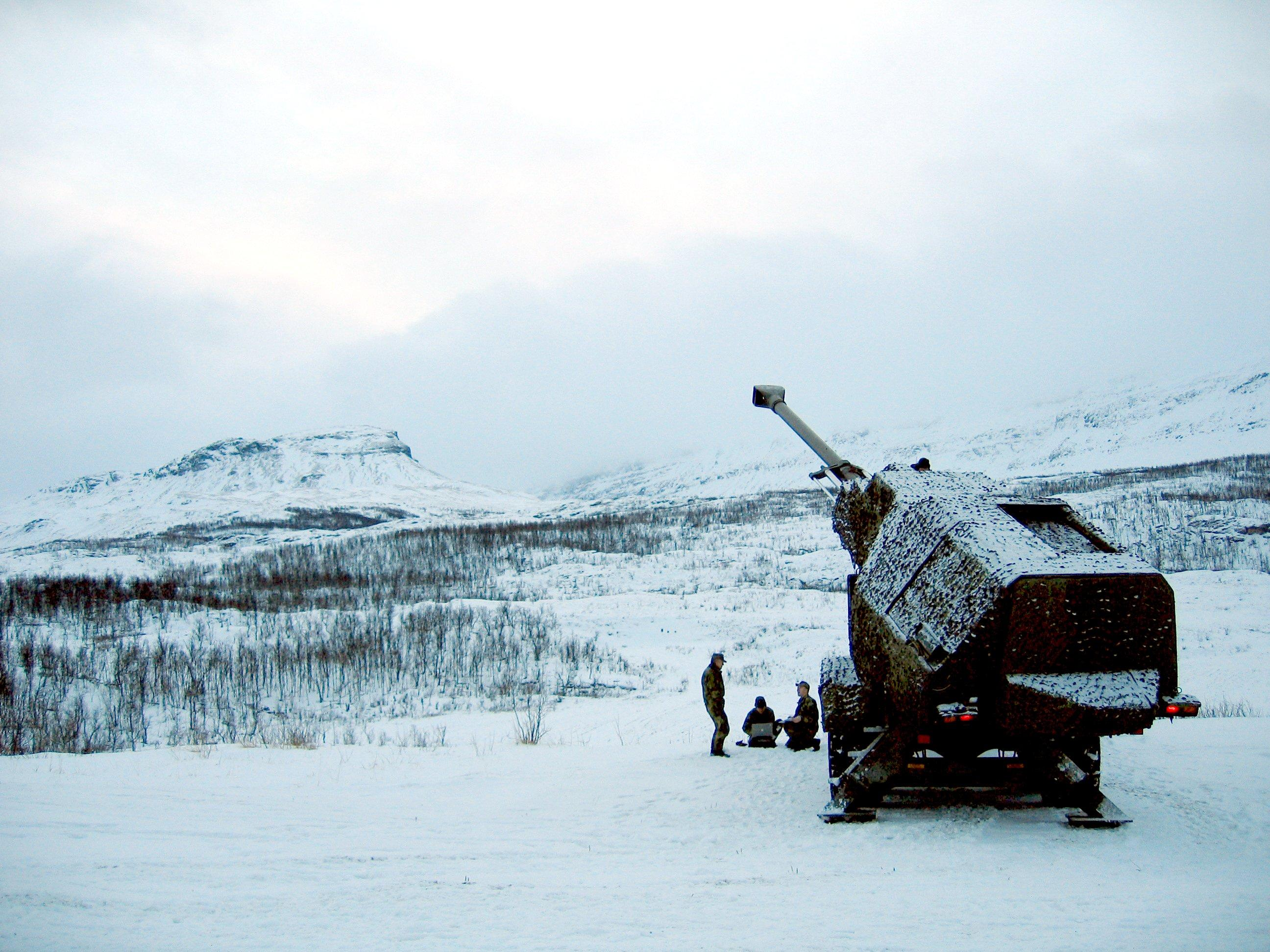
Another view of a deployed Archer

The vehicle carries 21 155 mm projectiles in a fully automatic magazine. Reloading the magazine from the accompanying munitions carrier takes about 10 minutes using the purpose-built lifting device. The howitzer can use NATO modular charges or Bofors Uniflex 2 modular charges. The Uniflex 2IM modular charge system consists of two sizes of combustible charge cases; one full-size and one half-size case, both filled with the same type of insensitive guanylurea dinitramide (GuDN) propellant. The modular charge system allows several increments of charge to be available and increases the system's multiple rounds simultaneous impact (MRSI) capability and good range overlap between the increments. With BAE Bofors/Nexter BONUS rounds the range is 35 kilometres (22 mi). Due to the glide wings of the precision-guided Raytheon/Bofors M982 Excalibur rounds, the range of the gun is extended to more than 50 kilometres (31 mi). The Excalibur shell is corrected in flight towards a pre-programmed trajectory by a GPS guidance system. For armoured vehicles, the Bofors 155 BONUS is used.

=== Operational capabilities ===
The system is designed for high strategic, operational and tactical mobility. The vehicle can reach road speeds of up to 90 kilometres per hour (56 mph), is capable of traversing snow up to a depth of one metre (3.3 ft), is rail transportable and can be air-transported in Boeing C-17 Globemaster III or Airbus A400M Atlas aircraft. A large hydraulically operated stabilizer is installed in the rear of the chassis and is lowered with the vehicle in the selected firing position. The gun elevation and traverse ranges are −1° to +70° vertically and −85° to +85° horizontally. The initial deployment time and the redeployment times are less than 30 seconds. The system provides precision strike and high sustained firepower for support and for deep firing operations with more than 25 t of ammunition per gun and 24-hour operation. The howitzer has a continuous fire rate of 75 rounds per hour, an intensive fire rate of 20 rounds (i.e., a full magazine) in 2.5 minutes (effective rate, 480 rounds per hour), and a salvo fire rate of three rounds in 15 seconds (effective rate, 720 rounds per hour). The MRSI capability, multiple round simultaneous impact, is up to 6 rounds. Direct-sighting can be used for target ranges up to 2,000 metres (2,200 yd).

=== Technical data ===
The detailed specifications and capabilities of each variant are summarised in the following table.

Parameters	Volvo A30D (6×6)	RMMV HX2 (HX44M) (8×8)
	Vehicle characteristics	
Length	14.3 m (47 ft)	13.1 m (43 ft)
Width	3 m (9.8 ft)	
Height	3.4 m (11 ft)	
Height (with turret)	4 m (13 ft)	
Gun elevation	10.4 m (34 ft)	
Mass	34 t (75,000 lb)	38 t (84,000 lb)
	Powertrain	
Engine	Volvo D9B AC E3 (9,400 cm^{3}, diesel, inline 6)	MAN D2066, (10,518 cm^{3}, diesel, inline 6)
Engine power	252 kW (343 PS)	324 kW (441 PS)
Power / mass ratio	7.41 kW/t (10.07 PS/t)	8.53 kW/t (11.60 PS/t)
Torque	1,700 N⋅m (1,300 lb⋅ft)	2,100 N⋅m (1,500 lb⋅ft)
Drivetrain	Longitudinal diff-lock on the move 6×4 or 6×6, diff-lock on each axle	Longitudinal diff-lock on the move 8×4 or 8×8, Hi-Lo transfer case MAN G172, diff-lock on each axle
	Vehicle performance	
Max speed	70 km/h (43 mph)	90 km/h (56 mph)
Cruising range	650 km (400 mi)	800 km (500 mi)
Max slope	58% (30°)	58% (30°)
Max lateral lean	53.2% (28°)	34.5% (19°)
Ground clearance	0.45 m (1.5 ft)	0.4 m (1.3 ft)
Fording depth	1 m (3.3 ft)	1 m (3.3 ft)
	Weapon system	
Primary weapon	Howitzer 155 mm FH77 BW L/52	
Elevation	-1° to +70°	
Traverse	-85° to +85°	
Loading system	Automatic loading	
Projectile magazine	21 projectiles	
Propellant magazine	126 modular propellant charges Bofors Uniflex 2 (made of insensitive guanylurea dinitramide, known as FOX-12 or GUDN). The propellant magazine contains 18 rows each with six full charges and one "half" charge.	
Secondary weapon	RCWS "Vapenstation 01" (M151 Protector with M2 Browning or 40mm automatic grenade launcher)	
Crew	1 to 4 crew members: 1 driver, 1 commander, 2 operators (The operators and commander can operate remotely)	3 crew members: 1 driver, 1 commander, 1 operator (The operator and commander can operate remotely)
	Electronic systems	
Fire control system	Fire control computer with NABK software (automated ballistics calculation, ammunition management, electronic fuse setting)	
Battle management system	LSS Mark (Ledningsstödsystem Mark) for Sweden	
Target acquisition	Open architecture for the integration to local battlefield management system for target data transmission	
INS (inertial navigation)	SAGEM Sigma 30	
Muzzle velocity radar	Weibel MVRS-700SC muzzle velocity radar	
	Weapon performance	
Weapon setup	Weapon ready to shoot in 20 seconds, out of action in 20 seconds	
Rate of fire	Multiple rounds simultaneous impact (MRSI) capable with 4 to 6 rounds depending on the range: Burst of 3 rounds in 20 seconds; Intensive mission of 21 rounds (full magazine) in 3 minutes; Continuous shooting, 54 rounds in 35 minutes	
Shells in use	Qualified shells on Archer: High explosive HE rounds, range < 30 km (19 mi); High explosive extended HEER, range > 40 km (25 mi), M982 Excalibur guided rounds, range < 50 km (31 mi); Bofors / Nexter BONUS anti-armour rounds, range < 35 km (22 mi); Smoke, illumination and training rounds	
	Protection	
Hull	It uses steel & appliqué armour. The cabin is protected against 7.62×51mm NATO AP rounds and artillery shell fragments (STANAG 4569 Level 3)	
Floor	The floor of both cabins is protected against 6 kg (explosive mass) blast AT mine (STANAG 4569 Level 2b)	
CBRN	Cabin overpressure and air filters	
Stealth	Radar absorbent painting, radar stealth geometry and IR stealth and Saab Barracuda camouflage nets with IR and radar stealth features	Radar absorbent paint, IR stealth and Saab Barracuda camouflage nets with IR and radar stealth features

== Operational history ==
=== Ukraine ===
In January 2024, a Ukrainian documentary crew from United24 observed the FH77BW Archer howitzer firing during combat missions. The news crew interviewed Ukrainian soldiers operating the system in the Luhansk region. One of the soldiers interviewed had previously worked with the Soviet-built D-20 howitzer. In contrast to the towed D-20's manual operation the Ukrainian soldier praised the automation and rapid emplacement of the FH77BW, describing it as "Sniper Artillery" for its one shot - one kill ability.

In February 2024, an Archer artillery system was hit by a Russian loitering munition close to the city of Kupiansk. Russian sources claimed that the howitzer was destroyed while Ukrainian sources claimed that the damage done to the vehicle was likely repairable.

In March 2024, a reconnaissance unit of the Ukrainian 63rd Mechanized Brigade detected multiple Russian D-20 howitzers near the city of Kreminna. The coordinates of the Russian howitzers was then passed on to the Ukrainian 45th Artillery Brigade which performed counter-battery fire using an Archer artillery system, with drone footage showing the destruction of three D-20 howitzers.

In May 2024, the Ukrainian 45th Artillery Brigade used the Archer system in combat during operations in the Luhansk region. The brigade's artillerymen, operating an FH77BW Archer howitzer successfully destroyed a Russian 2S19 Msta-S self-propelled artillery system near the village of Chervonopopivka. The Russian gun had been spotted by a Ukrainian reconnaissance team and the destruction was verified by a drone.

=== Sweden ===
In 2025, the Swedish Army claimed Archer has challenges operating in subarctic terrain with deep snow and limited road infrastructure. Therefore, Sweden is looking for tracked howitzer to complement wheeled Archer artillery. The Army aims to establish two battalions equipped with K9 Thunder, aligning with Finland and Norway to enhance interoperability and logistics within the Nordic defense cooperation.

== Operators ==
=== Current operators ===
==== Volvo A30D ====
(Sweden) Swedish Army (26)

Current operators

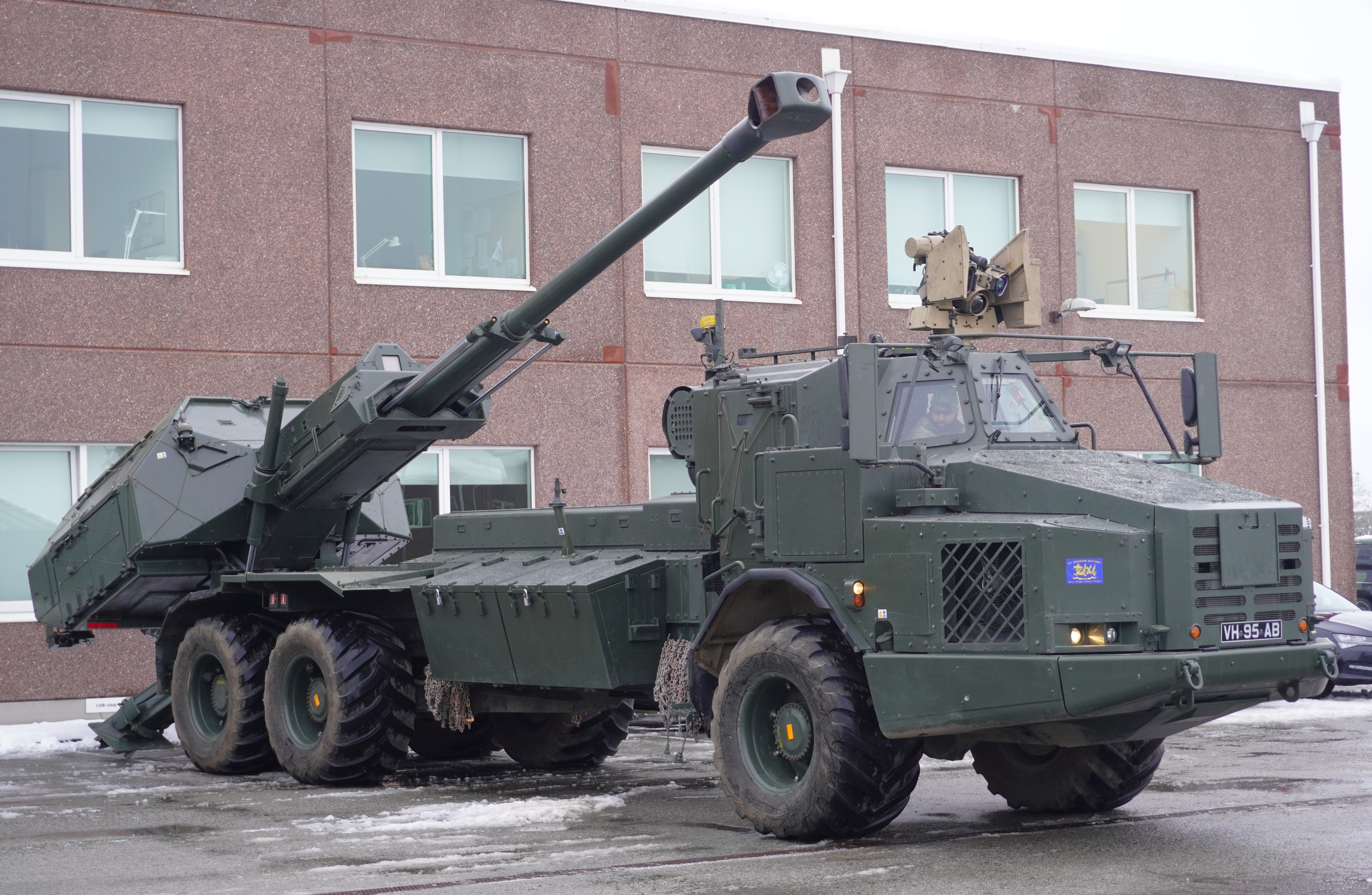
An Archer Artillery System of the British Army's 19th Regiment Royal Artillery displayed in ready position for Cambrai Day.

Swedish Artillery Regiment (A 9) demonstrates the highly-mobile Archer artillery system on 15 November 2021, at Camp Atterbury.

Purchases:
- 24 Archer ordered in March 2010.
- 24 Archer to be ordered, announced by the government in September 2016 (the 24 that were planned for Norway, but whom withdrew from the project in December 2013).
Sales:
- 14 Archer for the British Army: approval requested by the government to the Riksdag the 16 March 2023, which was accepted. The first Archer was delivered to the UK in October 2023. The 14 were all delivered by July 2024.
Donations:
- 8 Archer for the Ukrainian Army: approval requested by the government to the Riksdag the 16 March 2023, which was accepted. The 8 Archer were delivered to Ukraine by November 2023.
Status over time in the Swedish Army.
- First batch deliveries: first 4 Archer delivered to the FMV in September 2013 (pre-serie), first serial produced Archer delivered in September 2015. The initial batch of 24 Archer entered service between February 2016 and December 2016.
- Deliveries of the second batch completed by November 2022.
- March 2023: 24 in service. 24 in storage, among which 22 to be sold and donated, and 2 to be used by the FMV to further develop the Archer artillery system.
(United Kingdom) British Army (14)
14 owned as of July 2024. On 16 March 2023, the Swedish Government asked for permission from the Riksdag to sell 14 Archer Artillery Systems to the British Army as an interim replacement for 32 AS-90 gifted to Ukraine. Ownership of the systems was transferred in March 2023, and they would be fully operational by the following April. The first Archer was delivered in October 2023 and all were delivered by July 2024.
(Ukraine) Ukrainian Ground Forces (8)
Ukraine aid from Sweden:
- Archer based on the Volvo A30D
  - 8 Archer received as of November 2023. On 16 March 2023, the Swedish government announced that it would send 8 Archer artillery systems to the Ukrainian armed forces.
- Spare barrels:
  - 10 pledged in July 2025.

==== RMMV HX2 8×8 ====
(Sweden) Swedish Army (4 + 44 on order)
48 ordered under a contract signed in September 2023, with deliveries scheduled to begin in 2025. The cost for 48 artillery systems was USD $500 million.
The first units were delivered to the Swedish FMV on 21 April 2026. The first delivery to the Swedish Army took place the 26 August 2026. It will be introduced for conscript training from Autumn 2026.

=== Systems on order ===
(Ukraine) Ukrainian Ground Forces (36)
Aid packages from Sweden to the Ukrainian Ground Forces:
- 18 pledged in March 2025: The Swedish government authorised the FMV to purchase 18 Archer systems to be supplied to Ukraine with deliveries starting in 2026.
- 18 pledged in September 2025: The Swedish government decided on a 20th aid package, worth SEK 9.2 billion, that included a further 18 Archer artillery systems.

=== Potential operators ===
(Canada) Canadian Army
Canada is considering the purchase of new artillery systems. On one side, a MLRS system system is considered, and on the other side, a lightweight mobile artillery platform is being looked at, among which the Archer is an option.

=== Evaluation only ===
(United Kingdom) British Army
The Archer system was one of the contenders for the British Army's Mobile Fires Platform programme. The variant offered was based on the RMMV HX2 8×8 truck. As of December 2023, Babcock and Rheinmetall UK formally joined forces with BAE Bofors to pitch the Archer to the British Army. Among the competitors, there were: CAESAR (Nexter), the RCH-155 (KMW), the K9 Thunder (Hanwha Aerospace) and the ATI (Artillery Truck Interface, a module based on a HX3 10×10, made by Rheinmetall) which could eventually use a 155 L/60 calibre.
In April 2024, a defence agreement was reached between Germany and the United Kingdom and the choice to purchase the RCH-155 was made.

=== Failed bids ===
(Romania) Romanian Land Forces
BAE Bofors offered the Archer to the Romanian Army, in a bid for 36 wheeled self-propelled howitzers needed by Romania.
The ATMOS 2000 was selected by Romania in 2023.
(Switzerland) Swiss Armed Forces
BAE Systems Bofors announced in June 2022 that Switzerland had shortlisted the Archer for the final round of its Future Artillery System competition "Artillerie Wirkplattform und Wirkmittel 2026". The version selected is the one based on the RMMV HX2 8×8. On 11 August 2022, the Swiss Federal Office for Defence Procurement confirmed this decision and announced that the Archer would compete against the RCH 155. One of the variant was based on the Boxer platform and one based on the Mowag Piranha IV 10×10, and were evaluated in 2024.
In November 2024, the Swiss Armed Forces selected the RCH-155 based on the Mowag Piranha IV 10×10.
(United States) US Army
In July 2020, the US Army released a request for proposals to evaluate wheeled self-propelled howitzers. In October 2020, BAE Systems offered the Archer as a participant to the RFP. The other platforms tested were the ATMOS 2000, the CAESAr, the Brutus and the Nora B-52. Throughout 2021, the various wheeled self-propelled howitzers conducted a shoot off evaluation at the Yuma Proving Ground in Arizona and at Camp Atterbury. The Archer was tested in November 2021. As part of the evaluation, Lieutenant General Erik Peterson, visited Sweden to inspect the system in April 2022.
The interest for a wheeled self-propelled howitzer aims at increasing the mobility of the artillery capabilities, and to take a position between the M109 and the M777. At the same time, the platforms tested would offer an artillery system with an increased range as the greatest operational calibre in the US Army is the 155mm L/39. The US Army ultimately did not move forward with acquiring a wheeled howitzer system.
At AUSA 2024, the US military mentioned its renewed interest for a wheeled howitzer under the "mobile tactical cannon" capability. The system will be selected in 2026, and a contract for a certain number of cannons is planned for 2027. The systems mentioned include the Archer and the RCH 155.
On August 18, 2026, the US Army selected the K9 Thunder Mobile Howitzers (K9MH) variant for a prototype contract.

=== Cancelled order ===
(Norway) Norwegian Army
24 ordered for Royal Norwegian Artillery Battalion but the order was cancelled in December 2013 due to delays in the development and production, therefore not meeting needs within the time remaining available. Norway later chose to purchase the K9 Thunder in December 2017.
(Latvia) Latvian Land Forces (18)
On 11 June 2025, Latvian Minister of Defence Andris Spruds announced that 18 Archer systems were to be acquired, based on the RMMV HX2 8×8 with deliveries starting in 2026. The parliament approved the order in January 2026.
In September 2026, the Latvian government preferred to purchase the MORANA for budget and timeline reasons. The cost of the Archer was too high for what the Latvian government could afford. and the delivery timeline is reduced.

== See also ==
- List of wheeled self-propelled howitzers
- ATMOS 2000 – 155 mm wheeled SPH on 6×6 and 8×8 truck, Israeli system.
  - AHS Kryl – 155 mm SPH on 6×6 truck, Polish derivative of ATMOS 2000
  - ATROM – 155 mm SPH on 6×6 truck, Romanian derivative of ATMOS 2000
- А-222 “Bereg – 130 mm coastal artillery system on 8×8 truck, Russian system
- CAESAr – 155 mm wheeled SPH on 6×6 and 8×8 truck, French system
- DANA – 152 mm wheeled SPH on 8×8 truck, Czech system
- DITA and MORANA – 155 mm wheeled SPH on 8×8 truck, Czech system
- G6 Rhino – 155 mm wheeled SPH on 6×6 truck, South African system
- PCL-09 – 122 mm wheeled SPH on 6×6 truck, Chinese system
- PCL-161 – 122 mm wheeled SPH on 4×4 truck, Chinese system
- PCL-171 – 122 mm wheeled SPH on 6×6 AFV (Dongfeng CTL181A), Chinese system
- PCL-181 – 155 mm wheeled SPH on 6×6 truck, Chinese system
  - SH-15 – 155 mm wheeled SPH on 6×6 truck, Chinese system for export, derived from PCL-181
- PLL-09 – 122 mm wheeled SPH on 8×8 AFV (ZBL-08), Chinese system
- SH-1 – 155 mm wheeled SPH on 6×6 truck, Chinese system for export
- RCH-155 – German 155 mm SPH available on
  - 8×8 wheeled AFV (Boxer) and 10×10 wheeled AFV (Piranha IV, prototype)
  - tracked AFV (Donar on ASCOD 2, prototypes, or RCH-155 Boxer module on tracked Boxer)
  - possible on 6×6 and 8×8 trucks (prototypes)
- Type 19 – 155 mm wheeled SPH on 8×8 truck, Japanese system
- Zuzana and Zuzana 2 – 155 mm wheeled SPH on 8×8 truck, Slovak system
- 2S22 Bohdana – 155 mm wheeled SPH on 6×6 and 8×8 trucks, Ukrainian system
