= Armin Papperger =

German business executive

- Born: 30 January 1963; Mainburg
- Education: University of Duisburg-Essen
- Occupations: Business executive, mechanical engineer, engineer
- Employer: Rheinmetall (1990–)

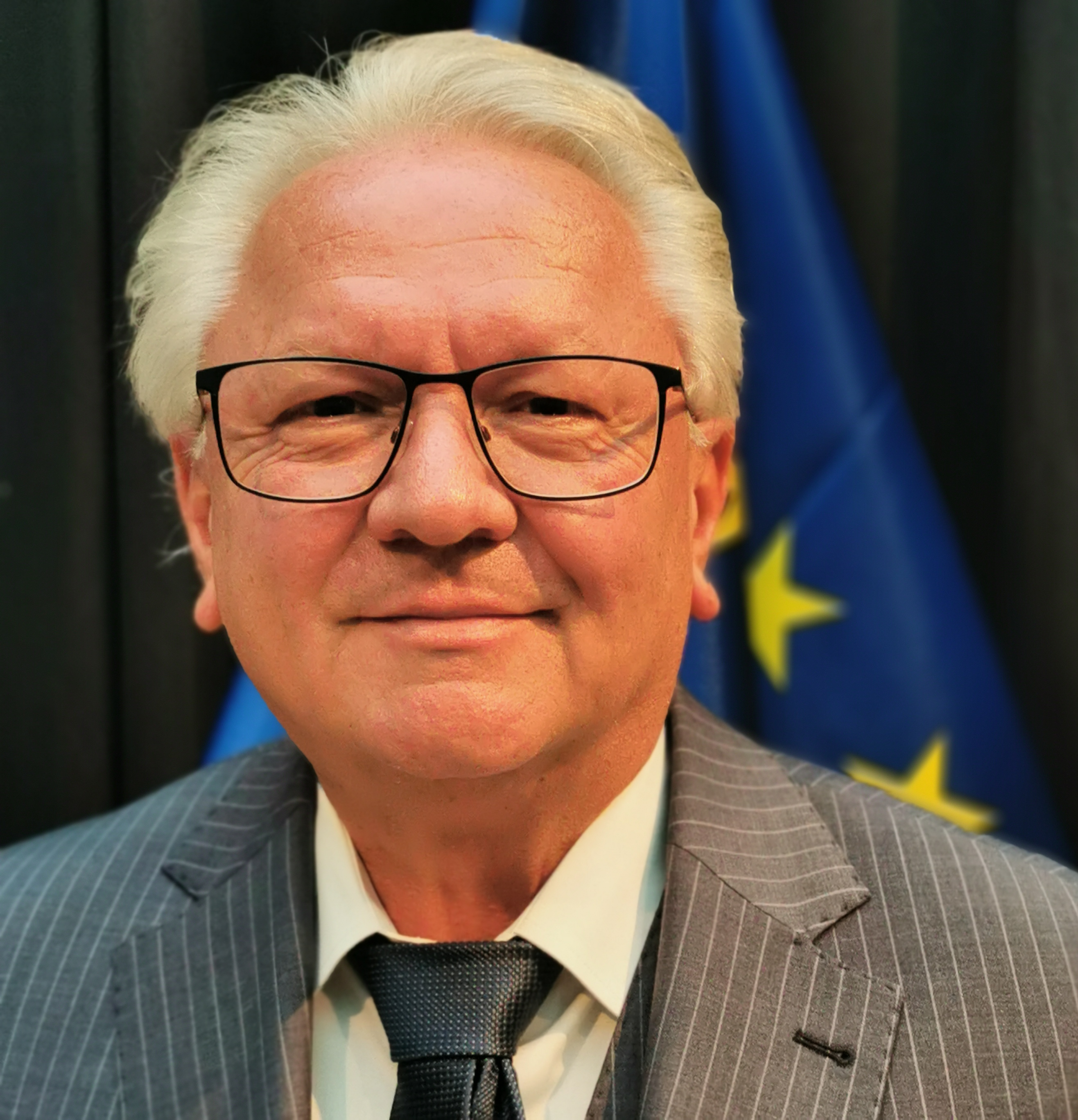
Armin Papperger (2026)

Armin Theodor Papperger (born 30 January 1963) is a German business executive, CEO of Rheinmetall AG, an automotive and arms manufacturer.

In 2024 it was claimed that American and German intelligence agents foiled a plan by Russia to assassinate him.

He was named by the British business magazine The Economist as the best CEO of 2025.

Papperger has criticised Ukrainian production and use of drones during the 2022 Russian invasion of Ukraine, arguing that it's like playing with Lego without any technological breakthrough. In 2026 he claimed that the biggest drone producers in Ukraine are housewives, making drone parts using 3D printers in their kitchens, and that this is not innovation. Ukrainian President Volodymyr Zelenskyy retorted, that if all Ukrainian housewives really are capable of building drones, then they could all become CEOs of Rheinmetall.
