= STANAG 4569 =

NATO standard for vehicle protection

NATO AEP-55 STANAG 4569 is a NATO Standardization Agreement covering the standards for the "Protection Levels for Occupants of Logistic and Light Armored Vehicles".

The standard covers strikes from kinetic energy, artillery and IED blasts.

== STANAG 4569 Protection Levels ==
Sources:

== Level 1 ==
=== Kinetic Energy ===
7.62×51mm NATO Ball (Ball M80) at 30 meters with velocity 833 ± 20 m/s

5.56×45mm NATO Ball (SS109) at 30 meters with a velocity of 900 ± 20 m/s

5.56×45mm NATO Ball (M193) at 30 meters with a velocity of 937 ± 20m/s

Protection against all three threats must be provided.

=== Grenade and Mine Blast ===
Hand grenades, unexploded artillery fragmenting submunitions, and other small anti personnel explosive devices detonated under the vehicle.

=== Artillery ===
155 mm High Explosive at 100 m

Angle: Azimuth 360°; elevation: 0–18°

== Level 2 ==
=== Kinetic Energy ===
7.62×39mm API BZ at 30 meters with 695 ± 20 m/s

=== Grenade and Mine Blast Threat ===
6 kg (explosive mass) Blast AT Mine:
2a – Mine Explosion pressure activated under any wheel or track location.
2b – Mine Explosion under center.

=== Artillery ===
155 mm High Explosive at 80 m

Angle: Azimuth 360°; elevation: 0–22°

== Level 3 ==
=== Kinetic Energy ===
7.62×51mm AP (WC core) at 30 meters with 930 ± 20 m/s

7.62×54R mm B32 API at 30 meters with 854 ± 20 m/s

Angle: Azimuth 360°; elevation 0–30°

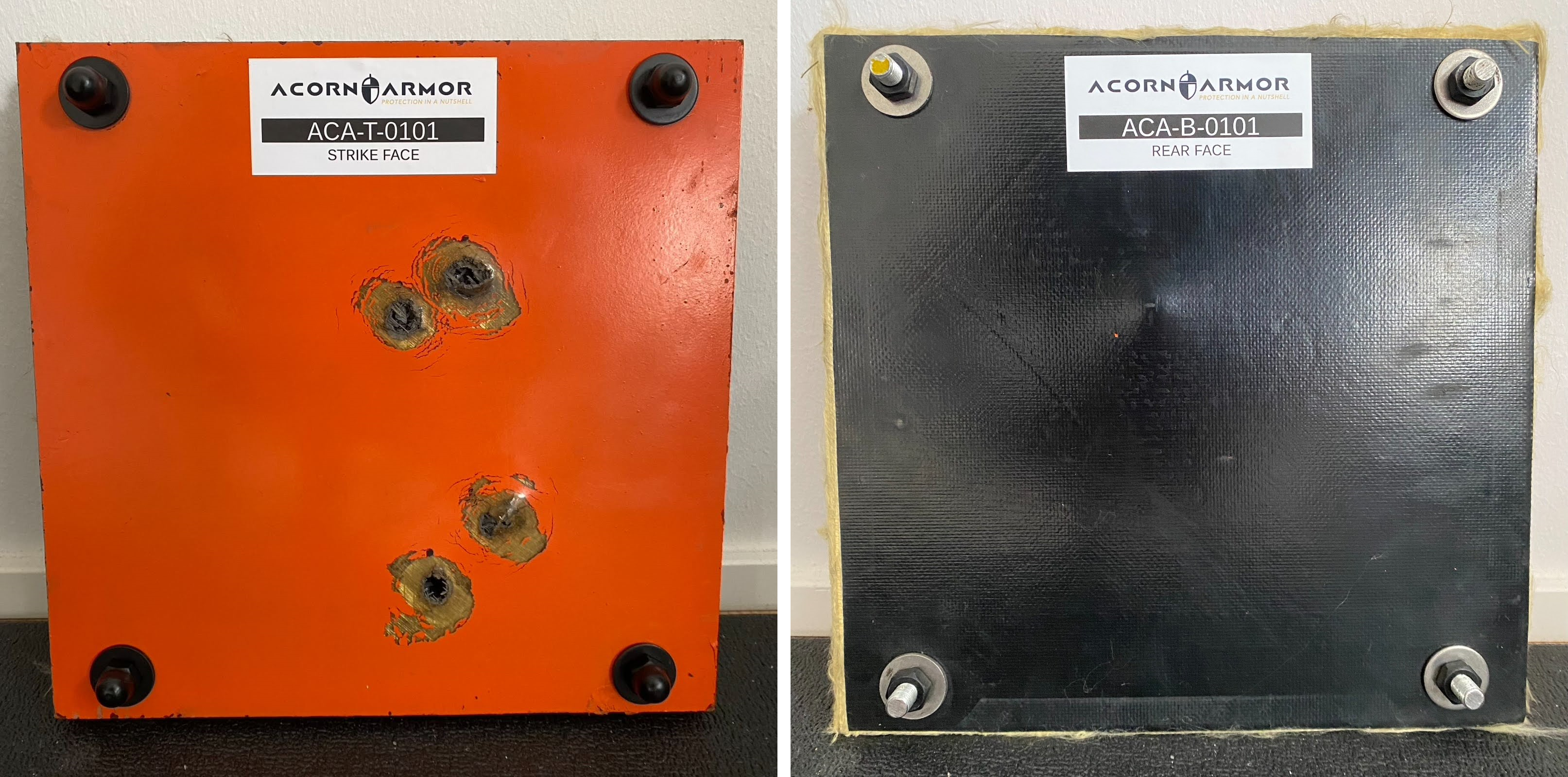
Composite Armor tested in accordance with STANAG 4569 Kinetic Energy Level 3 specifications.

=== Grenade and Mine Blast Threat ===
8 kg (explosive mass) Blast AT Mine:
3a – Mine Explosion pressure activated under any wheel or track location.
3b – Mine Explosion under center.

=== Artillery ===
155 mm High Explosive at 60 m

Angle: Azimuth 360°; elevation: 0–30°

== Level 4 ==
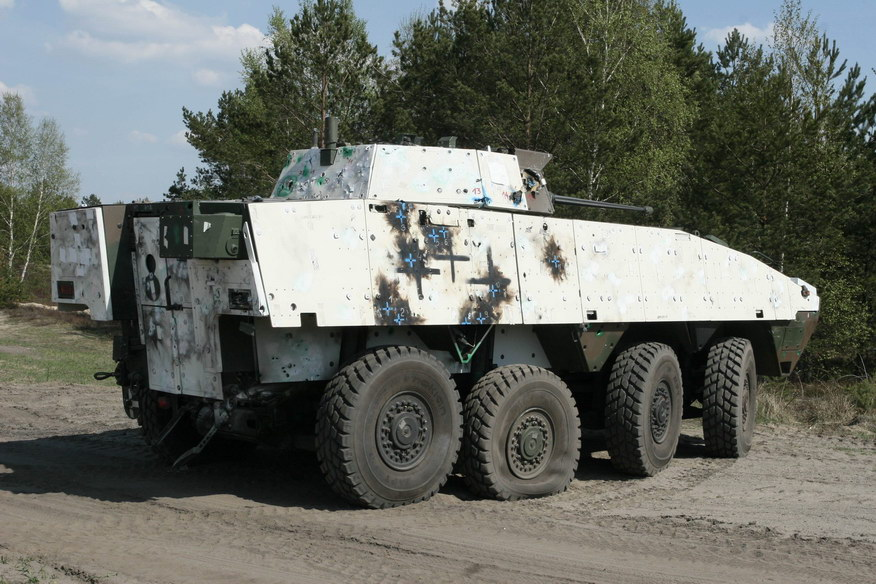
Shooting tests against Polish uparmoured level 4 KTO Rosomak IFV

=== Kinetic Energy ===
14.5×114mm API / B32 at 200 meters with 911 ± 20 m/s

Angle: Azimuth 360°; elevation 0°

=== Artillery ===
20 mm FSP (simulating 155 mm threat) at 960 ± 20 m/s from a distance of 25 meters.

Angle: azimuth 360°; elevation: 0–90°

=== Grenade and Mine Blast Threat ===
10 kg (explosive mass) Blast AT Mine:
4a – Mine Explosion pressure activated under any wheel or track location.
4b – Mine Explosion under center.

== Level 5 ==
=== Kinetic Energy ===
25x137mm APDS-T (M791) or TLB 073 at 500 m with 1258 ± 20 m/s

Angle: Frontal arc to centreline: ± 30° sides included, elevation 0°

=== Artillery ===
20 mm FSP (simulating 155 mm threat) at 960 ± 20 m/s from a distance of 25 meters.

Angle: azimuth 360°; elevation: 0–90°

== Level 6 ==
=== Kinetic Energy ===
30 mm APFSDS or AP at 500 m

Angle: Frontal arc to centreline: ± 30° sides included, elevation 0°

=== Artillery ===
155 mm High Explosive at 10 m

Angle: Azimuth 360°; elevation: 0–90°
