= MONARC =

German naval weaponry study

Modular Naval Artillery Concept (MONARC) was a study of the German defence industry about mounting the turret of the PzH 2000 self-propelled howitzer on a naval ship of frigate size.

== Description ==
The size required above and below deck and the weight of this turret are not much different from the OTO Melara 76 mm gun system, the standard naval gun of the German Navy. But to deal with the much greater recoil of the 155 mm (6.1 in) artillery piece on such a vessel, a flexible mount with damping elements had to be designed.

This mount and a PzH 2000's turret was fitted experimentally in December 2002 on the Type 124 Sachsen-class frigate Hamburg at the shipyards of HDW in Kiel, when she was still fitting out. In 2004 the fire-control system was tested with a PzH 2000 strapped onto the helicopter deck of Hessen, another Type 124 frigate. The feasibility of using an unmodified PzH 2000 turret using unguided "dumb" rounds to attack naval targets had been proven previously by the Swedish Coastal Artillery, with tests performed in May 1996.

Rheinmetall, the producer of PzH 2000's gun system, plans to design special smart naval rounds that will boost the range of the gun from 30 km (19 mi) with standard NATO ammunition and 40 km (25 mi) with assisted rounds to over 80 km (50 mi), more than that of many anti-ship missiles.

The future F125 class frigate was intended to make use of this concept. While the intricate elastic mounting system handled the recoil adequately, adapting all of the PzH-2000's systems for the corrosive naval environment proved more difficult and more costly than expected and MONARC appears to have been removed from F125 plans. The F125 class will now mount the new developed Otobreda 127/64 naval gun, which has a range of more than 120 km (75 mi) when using guided Vulcano ammunition.

== See also ==
4.5-inch Mark 8 naval gun - considered for a programme to 'up-gun' to the 155mm gun of the AS90 in a similar role
