= Panzerhaubitze 2000 =

German 155 mm self-propelled howitzer

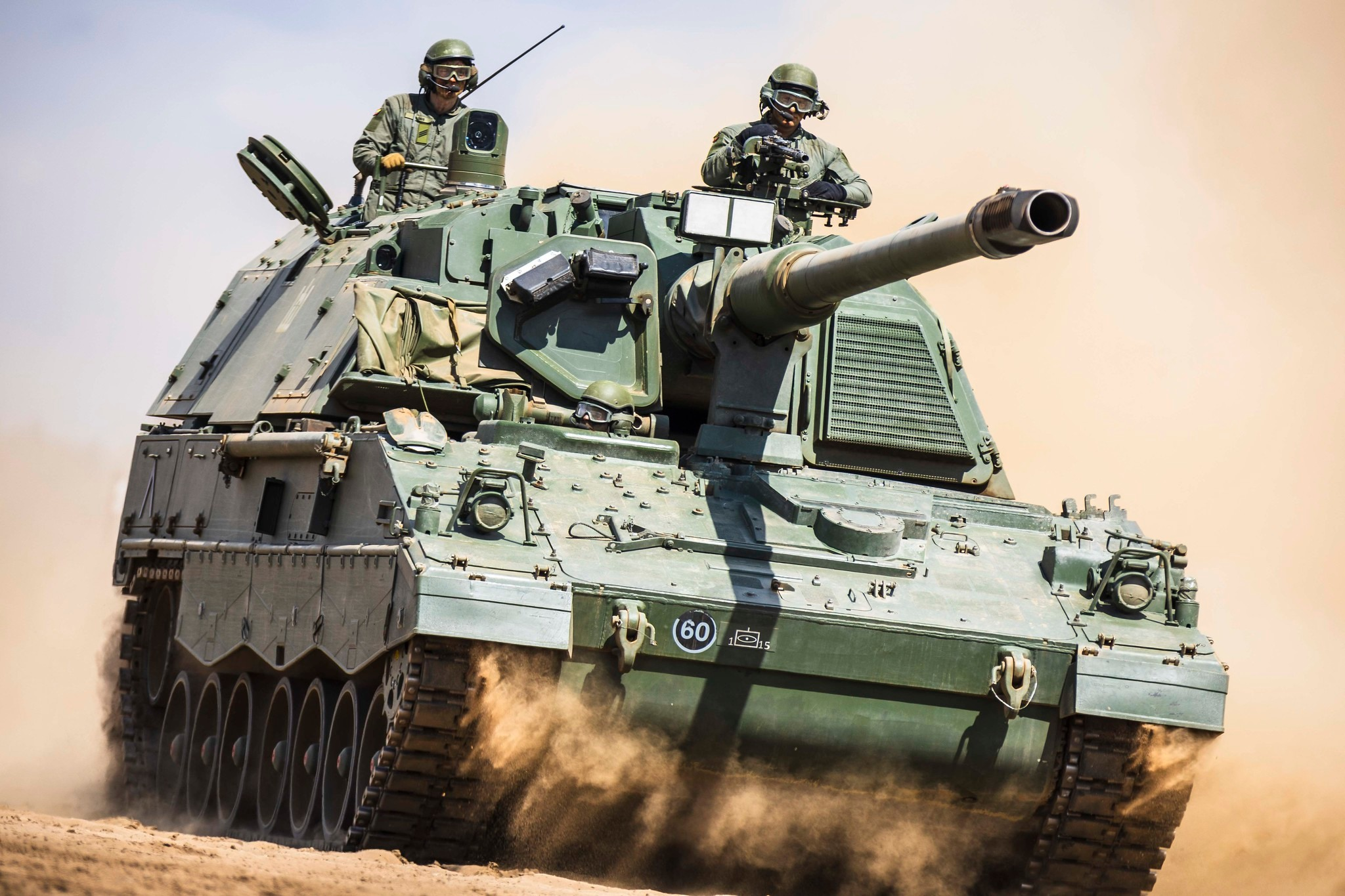
- Lithuanian Panzerhaubitze 2000 from the front
- Type: Self-propelled howitzer
- Place of origin: Germany

Service history
- In service: 1998–present
- Used by: See Operators
- Wars: War in Afghanistan; Russo-Ukrainian War; Russian invasion of Ukraine

Production history
- Designed: 1987–1995
- Unit cost: €17 million (2022)
- Produced: 1995–present

Specifications
- Mass: Combat: 55.8 t (61.5 short tons)
- Length: 11.7 m (38 ft 5 in)
- Width: 3.6 m (11 ft 10 in)
- Height: 3.1 m (10 ft 2 in)
- Crew: 5 (commander, driver, gunner, and two loaders)
- Rate of fire: 3 rounds in 9 seconds (burst); 10 rounds per minute
- Effective firing range: DM121 Boattail: 30 km (19 mi); M1711 base bleed: 40 km (25 mi); M2005 V-LAP (RAP): 54 km (34 mi)
- Armor: Welded steel, 14.5 mm resistant Additional bomblet protection
- Main armament: Rheinmetall 155 mm L52 Artillery Gun; 60 rounds
- Secondary armament: 7.62 mm Rheinmetall MG3 machine gun
- Engine: MTU MT881 Ka-500; 1,000 PS (986 hp, 736 kW)
- Power/weight: 17.92 PS/t
- Transmission: Renk HSWL284C
- Suspension: Torsion bar
- Operational range: 420 km (260 mi)
- Maximum speed: Road: 67 km/h (41 mph); Off-road: 45 km/h (28 mph)

The Panzerhaubitze 2000 (German pronunciation: [ˈpant͡sɐhaʊ̯ˌbɪt͡sə t͡svaɪ̯ˈtaʊ̯zn̩t]), meaning "armoured howitzer 2000" and abbreviated PzH 2000, is a German 155 mm self-propelled howitzer developed by KNDS Deutschland (formerly Krauss-Maffei Wegmann (KMW)) and Rheinmetall in the 1980s and 1990s for the German Army. The PzH 2000 has automatic support for up to five rounds of multiple round simultaneous impact. Replenishment of shells is automated. Two operators can load 60 shells and propelling charges in less than 12 minutes. The PzH 2000 equips the armies of Germany, Italy, Ukraine, Netherlands, Greece, Lithuania, Hungary, Qatar, and Croatia, mostly replacing older systems such as the M109 howitzer.

In November 2019, a PzH 2000 L52 gun fired a shell a distance of almost 67 km (42 mi). Rheinmetall started testing a prototype L52 gun barrel with a new charge for a range of at least 75 km (47 mi) since 2020. In May 2024, Rheinmetall announced that it would supply "a three-digit number" of L52 gun barrel systems for the Panzerhaubitze 2000 for "a European customer country".

== Development ==
In 1986, Italy, the United Kingdom and Germany agreed to terminate their existing development of the PzH 155-1 (SP70) programme, which had run into reliability problems and had design defects, notably being mounted on a modified tank chassis. German industry was asked for proposals to build a new design with a gun conforming to the JBMOU. Of the proposed designs, Wegmann's was selected.

== Design ==
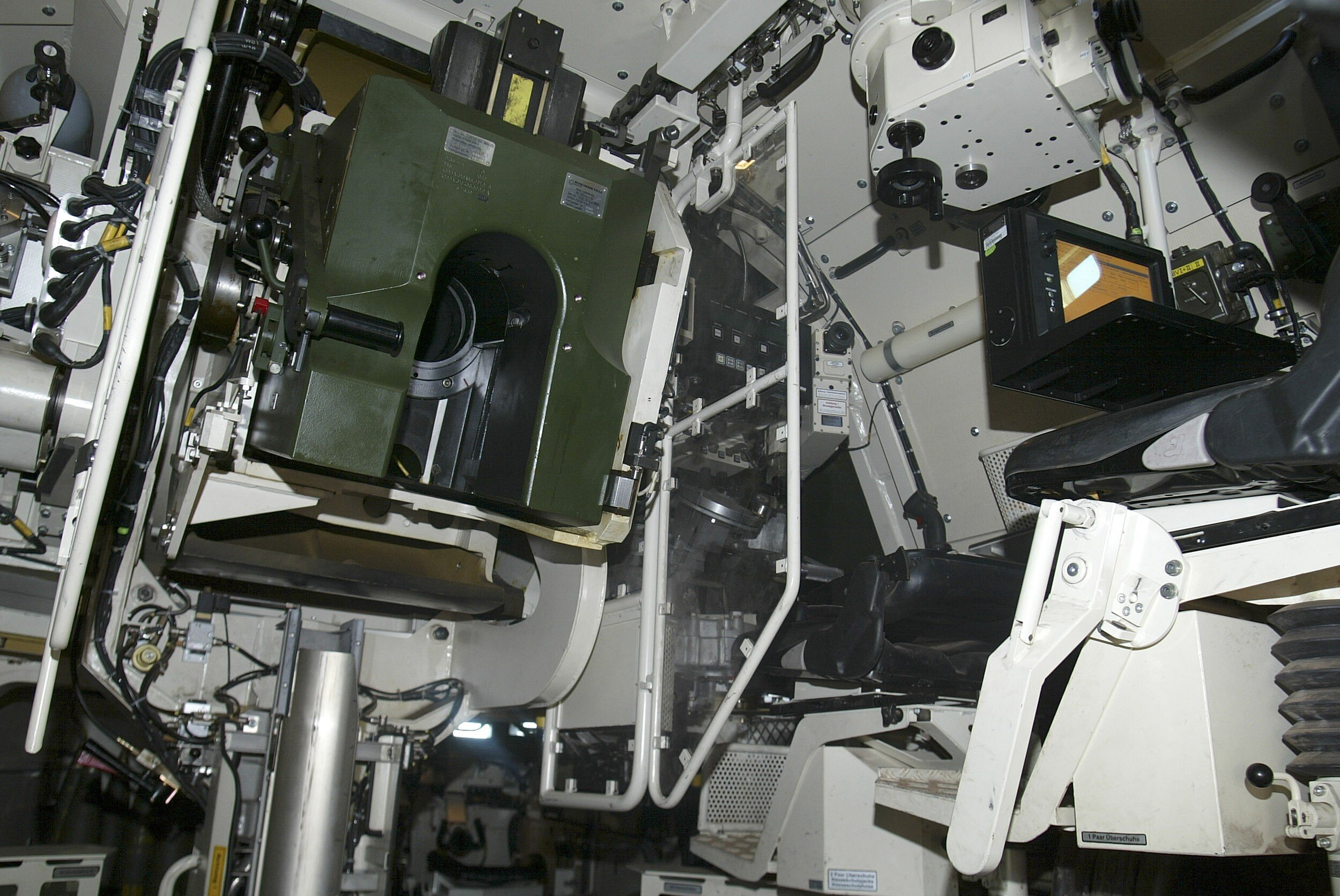
The fighting compartment

Rheinmetall designed the 155 mm 52-calibre JBMOU compliant rifled gun (60-rifles, right-hand spiral), which is chromium-lined over its entire 8 m length and includes a muzzle brake on the end. The gun uses a new modular charge system with six charges (five identical), which can be combined to provide the optimal total charge for the range to the target, as well as the conventional bagged charge systems. Primer is loaded separately via a conveyor belt, and the entire loading, laying and clearing are completely automated.

The maximum range of the gun with standard issue DM92 propellant charges is 30 km with the standard DM121 boattail round, 40 km with base bleed rounds, and 54 km with M2005 V-LAP rocket-assisted projectile. With Rheinmetall's ERC (Extender Range Charge, previously known as the Top Charge) high pressure unitary charge, the range is 36 km with DM121 BT round, 47 km with M0121 BB round and 67 km with the M2005 V-LAP RAP. The gun can also fire the SMArt 155 artillery round used by Germany and Greece.

Wegmann supplied both the chassis, sharing some components with the Leopard 2, and the turret for the gun. The system has superb cross-country performance because of its use of continuous tracks and considerable protection in the case of counter-fire. The turret includes a phased array radar on the front glacis for measuring the muzzle velocity of each round fired. Laying data can be automatically provided via encrypted radio from the battery fire direction centre.

A lighter, more air-portable version developed by KMW and called the Artillery Gun Module uses the gun in a module fitted to a lighter chassis.

In December 2013, Raytheon and the German Army completed compatibility testing for the M982 Excalibur extended range guided artillery shell with the PzH 2000. Ten Excaliburs were fired at ranges from 9 to 48 km. Shells hit within 3 m of their targets, with an average miss distance of 1 m at 48 km.

=== Upgrades ===
==== PzH 2000 A1 ====
Upgrades:

- Improved barrel laying system for a better accuracy.
- Navigation system more accurate.

==== PzH 2000 A2 ====
Upgrades:

- Auxiliary power unit of 1.9 kW added on the PzH 2000.
- Ventilation opening at the rear of the turret added.
- Cooling system added for the charges.
- Stowage of the tow cable relocated.

==== PzH 2000 A3 ====
The PzH 2000 A3 focused on the anti-mine protection, but it never enter service, and the upgrades were not included in the A4 variant.

==== PzH 2000 A4 ====
The first PzH 2000 in that variant was rolled out in November 2025. It is a newly produced gun, one that replaces the guns supplied to Ukraine for the German Army.

The upgrades focus on the electronic aspect:

- The architecture of the weapon system remains a mix of analogue and digital systems.
- KNDS Deutschland Centurion: a new fire control computer, replacing the MICMOS (1980s /1990s technology).
- A new fuse programming station installed.
- Improvement of the electronic architecture.
- Integration of the Vulcano 155mm ammunition.

==== PzH 2000 A5 ====
In 2021, Germany and the Netherlands agreed to jointly define & execute a Mid-Life Update to the operational Pzh2000 in their inventories and ensure standardisation and availability.

The MLU variant is the PzH 2000 A5, it is designed for all customers, with core common elements, and optional elements, it is expected to be ready by 2028.

Upgrades:

- Transition to a fully electronic / digital architecture, with a semi-open architecture (standardised electronic interfaces) of the weapon system.
- Ammunition auto loader improvements.
- Gun laying system improvements.
- Two-slip ring solution for the turret (to cope with the ammunition handling system).

== Combat record and alterations ==
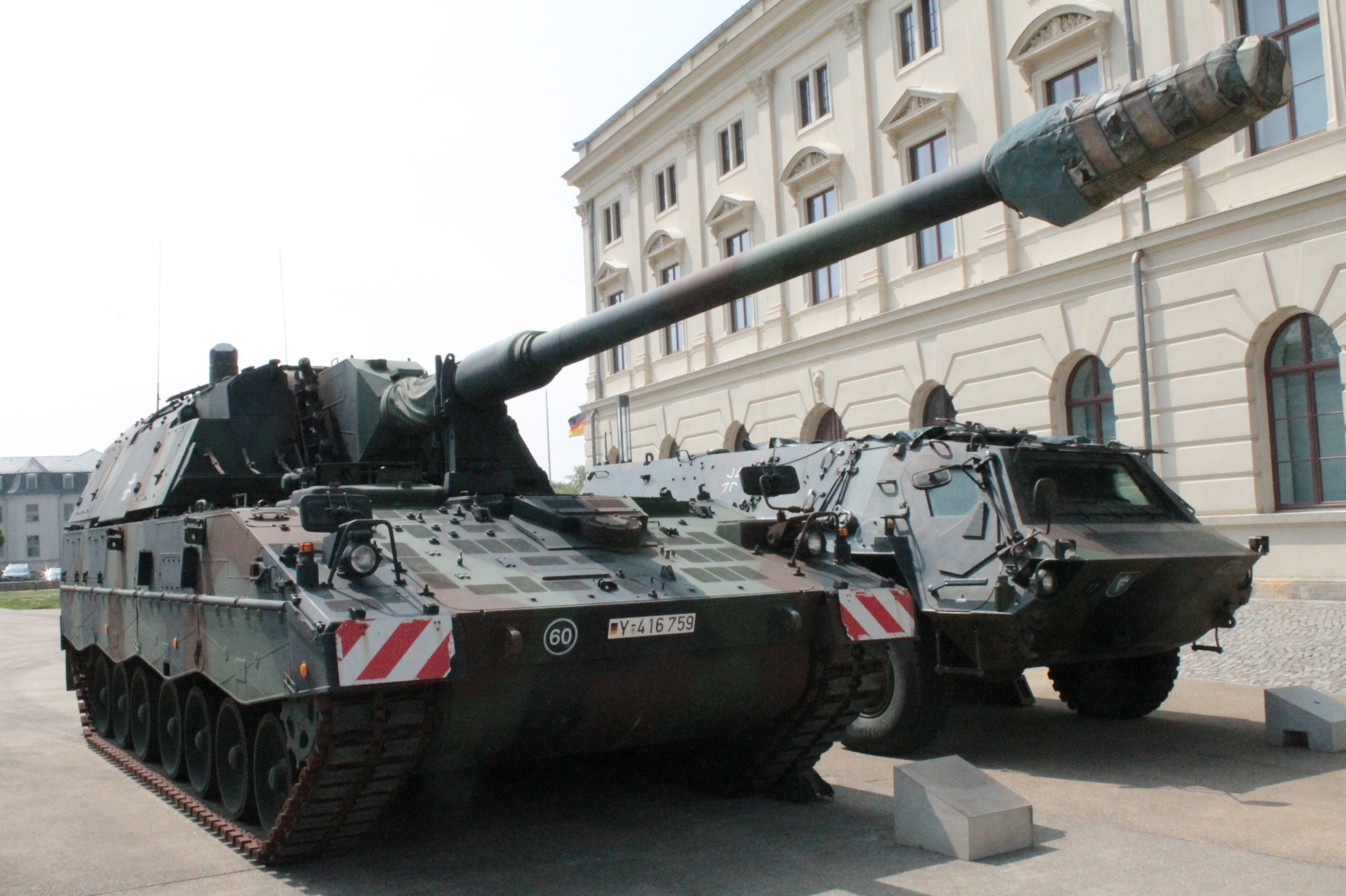
Panzerhaubitze 2000 – Bundeswehr Military History Museum, Dresden

The PzH 2000 was used for the first time in combat by the Fire Support Command of the Royal Netherlands Army in August 2006 against Taliban targets in Kandahar Province, Afghanistan, in support of Operation Medusa. It was then used regularly in support of coalition troops in Uruzgan province. The PzH 2000 was also used extensively during the Battle of Chora in June 2007. It was known as "the long arm of ISAF" and proved to be accurate and effective. However, the gun was criticised by the Dutch in Uruzgan province as the NBC system, designed for use in Europe, could not cope with the high level of dust in Afghanistan.

The guns have been modified with additional armor being fitted to the roof to protect against mortar rounds. There have been reports of other problems, including the need to keep it in the shade unless actually firing, the damage done when traveling on poorly built roads, and a significant 'cold gun' effect necessitating the use of 'warmers'.

Starting in June 2010 as a result of the Good Friday Battle, German ISAF troops at PRT Kunduz had three PzH 2000s at their disposal. They were first used on 10 July 2010 to provide support for the recovery of a damaged vehicle. This was the first time in its history that the Bundeswehr has used heavy artillery in combat. The PzH 2000 also played a key role during Operation Halmazag in November 2010, when the villages of Isa Khel and Quatliam were retaken from the Taliban by German paratroopers.

=== Russian invasion of Ukraine ===
On 21 June 2022, twelve PzH 2000s were deployed to Ukraine; seven came from Germany and five from the Netherlands. After a couple of weeks of intensive use, the guns required repairs, and error messages were being displayed as they are designed and built to fire no more than 100 shots a day. Germany considers 100 shots per day "a high-intensity mission". Ukraine has consistently exceeded this number, placing stress on the loading mechanism. Ukraine also fired "special ammunition at too great a distance." The Bundeswehr sent spare parts and a repair facility in Lithuania was chosen to repair the weapons. This came as Ukraine and KMW entered into a 1.7 billion euro deal to purchase 100 PzH 2000s.

Russian state news agency TASS reported that a PzH 2000 was destroyed by Russian forces in Kherson Oblast on 30 October 2022.

The open-source intelligence site Oryx reported one visually confirmed destroyed and one damaged Ukrainian PzH 2000 based on publicly available footage.

Due to the intensity of artillery fire on the battlefield, Lithuania undertook to repair twelve of the howitzers, finishing repair work on six by December 2022. By this time, the number of PzH 2000s sent to Ukraine rose to twenty-two; fourteen from Germany and eight from the Netherlands. As of February 2023, fifteen of the howitzers were waiting to be repaired in Slovakia, but were being held up at the border for several weeks due to legal issues.

According to the Rheinmetall CEO Armin Papperger the barrels of the PzH 2000 had an expected lifetime of around 4,500 shots, but to the surprise of the manufacturer they have achieved up to 20,000 in Ukraine.

== Production status ==
As of June 2024, 41 remain to be manufactured, it includes 1 for Hungary, 22 for Germany and 18 for Ukraine.

== Operators ==
=== Summary ===
Operators October 2024	Order	Deliveries	Sold [ – ] / Bought [ + ]	Donation [ – ] / [ + ]	Known Losses [ – ]	Operational
(Germany) German Army	225	185 + 22 + 18	25	14; 7	–	139
(Croatia) Croatian Army	–	–	+ 16	–	–	16
(Greece) Hellenic Army	25	25	–	–	–	25
(Hungary) Hungarian Army	24	23 + 1	–	–	–	23
(Italy) Italian Army	70	70	–	-6	–	64
(Lithuania) Lithuanian Army	–	–	+ 21	–	–	21
(Netherlands) Dutch Army	57	57	–	8	–	49
(Qatar) Qatari Army	24	24	12	–	–	12
Ukrainian Ground Forces	–	–	–	+ 39 + 7	–	39
Total	425	384	0	0	–	384

Planned transfer to Ukraine

Order not completed yet

=== Current operators ===
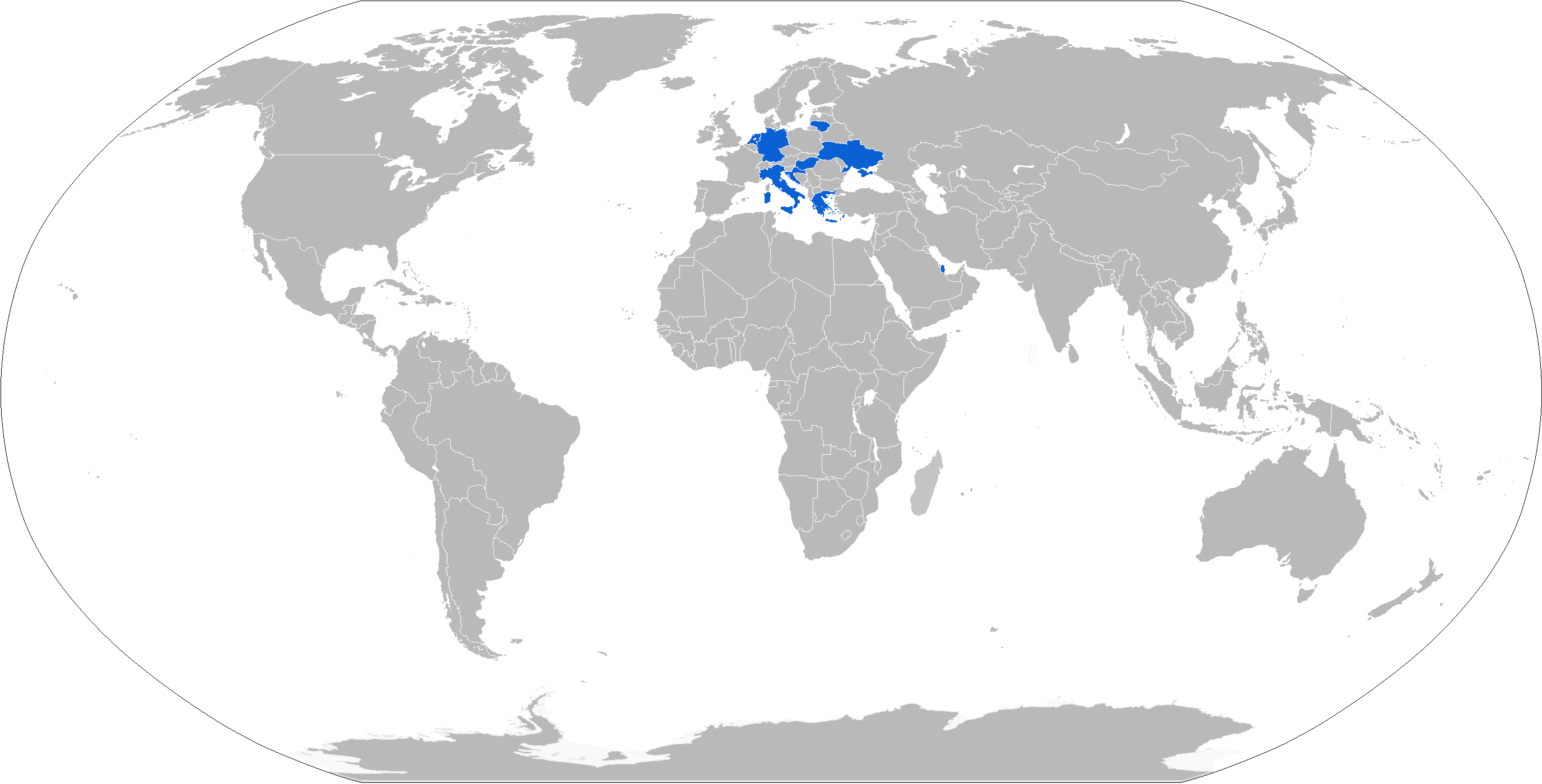
PzH 2000 operators in blue

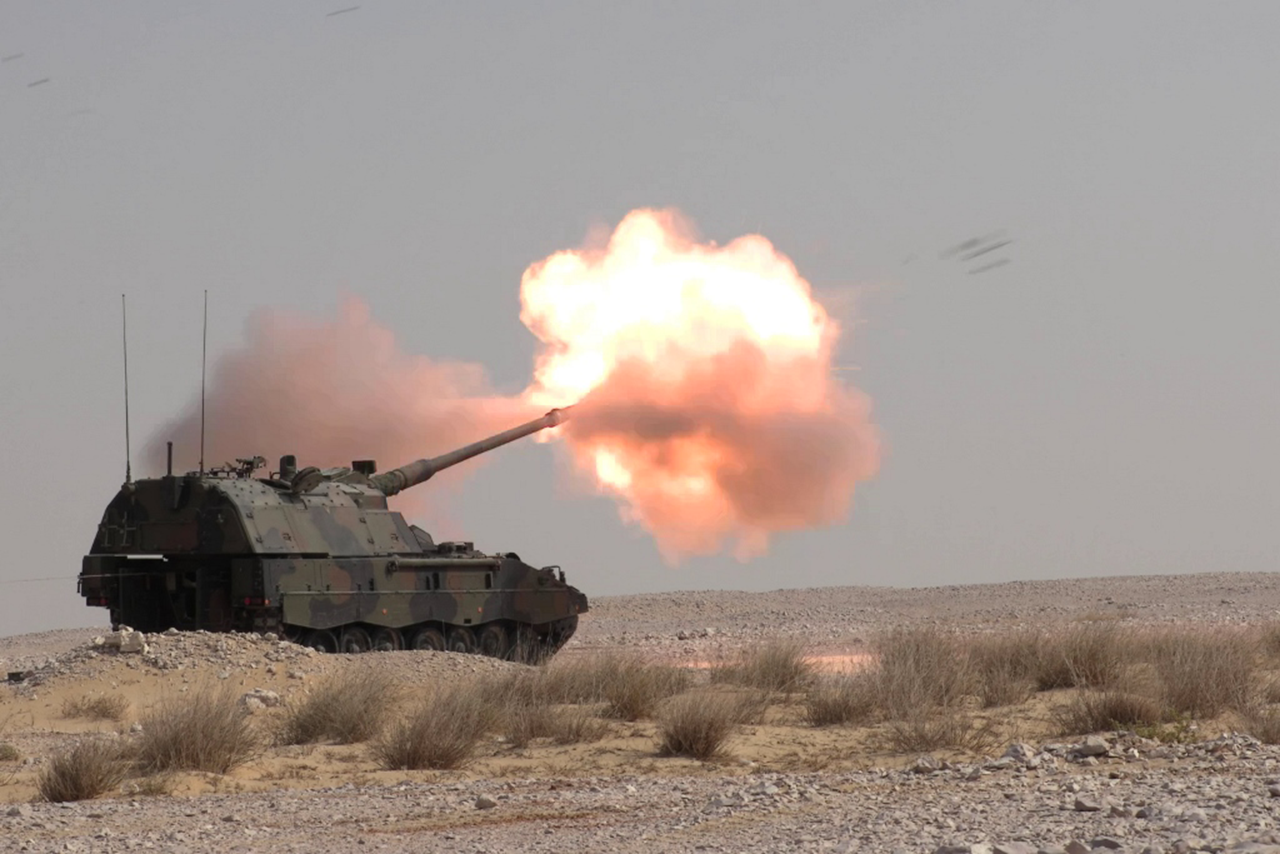
Italian Army PzH 2000 in Qatar

Croatia (16)
16 ordered (second-hand from Germany); 12 to be modernized and overhauled, 3 for spare parts, 1 for training. Total value of the contract was 55 million euros. The first PzH 2000 was delivered on 29 July 2015. Agreement for the procurement was signed in 2014, deliveries were to take place between 2015 and 2016, howitzers to be introduced in service by 2019.
Germany (134 in service, 12 on order)
Orders:
- Initial purchase of 185 between 1998 and 2002
- 10 in March 2023
- 12 in May 2023
- Option remaining for 6 additional PzH 2000
- 18 ordered to be donated to Ukraine
Second hand sales:
- 16 sold to Croatia in 2014
- 21 sold to Lithuania in September 2015 (18 modernised)
Donations to Ukraine:
- 14 (7+3+4) were sent to Ukraine by October 2022.
- 18 additional to be donated to Ukraine
Spare parts orders:
- 50 Renk HSWL284C gearboxes ordered in October 2024
- 3-digit number of gun barrels ordered in May 2024 (delivery 2024-2029)
Greece (25)
25 ordered in 2001 and delivered between 2003 and 2004.
Hungary (24)
24 were ordered in December 2018. As of 2024, 23 were delivered.
Italy (64)
70 ordered in 2002 and delivered between 2004 and 2008. 6 donated to Ukraine.

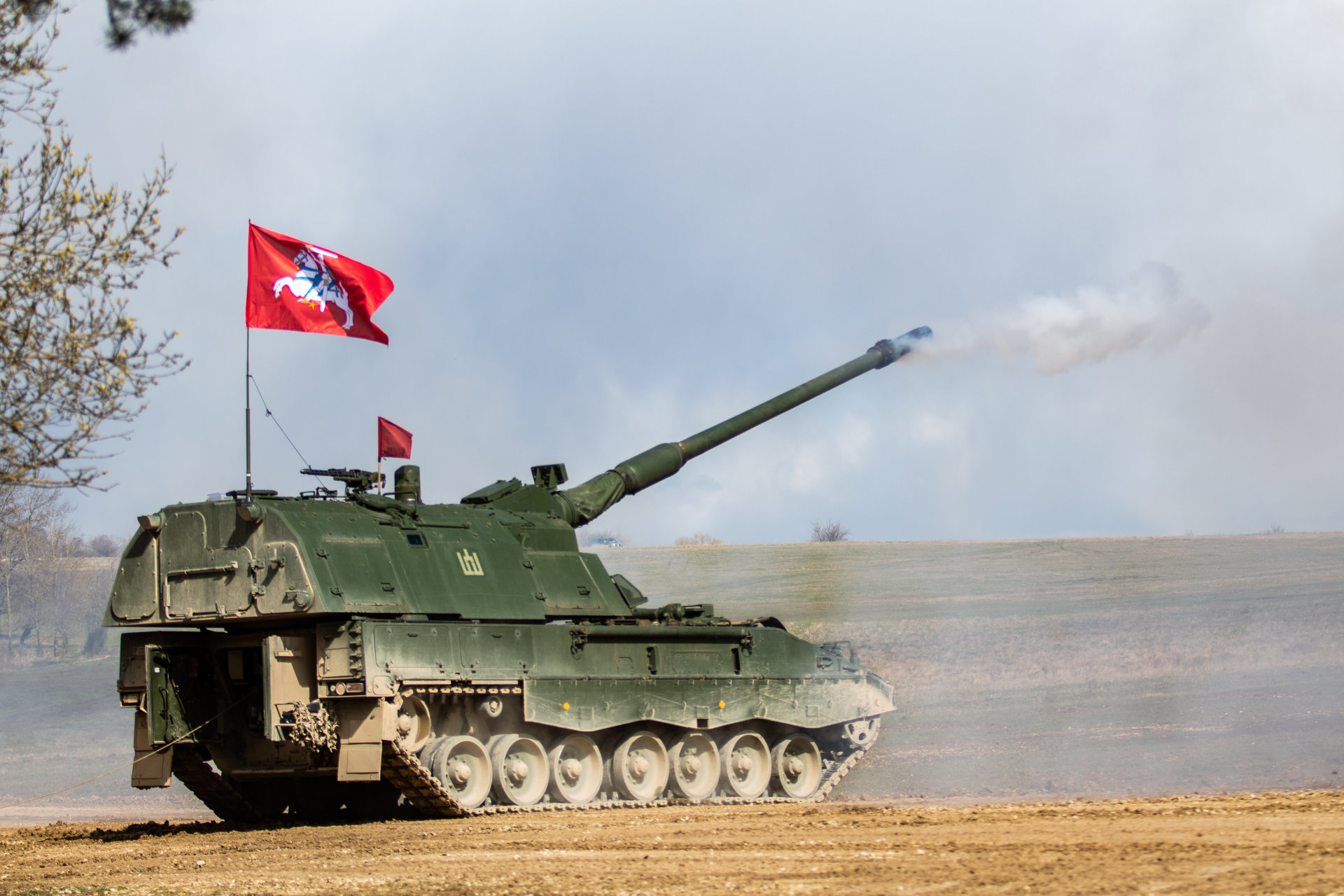
Lithuanian Army PzH 2000 firing

Lithuania (21)
21 delivered between 2015 and 2022. 16 active, 3 for spare parts, and 2 for training.
Netherlands (49)
57 ordered in 2002. Replaced the M109. Prior to the war in Ukraine, 33 were in storage, 18 in active service, and 6 used for training. Now, 46 to be modernised by 2024. In 2022, 5+3 were sent to Ukraine.
Qatar (12)
24 ordered in 2013, first three delivered in 2015. In September 2024 12 were returned to Germany to be provided to Ukraine in a Ringtausch arrangement in exchange for replacement with 12 RCH-155.
Ukraine (38)
28 delivered. During the Russian invasion of Ukraine, it was announced on 20 April 2022 that five Dutch PzH 2000s would be transferred to Ukraine, with ammunition and training to be provided by Germany. On 6 May, it was announced that Ukraine would receive seven units from German army stocks which were undergoing maintenance. On 7 May, Chancellor Olaf Scholz agreed to supply the ammunition required, straight from industry to Ukrainian forces, without having to go through the German government for approval in the future. Training of Ukrainian artillery crews started on 11 May 2022 at the Bundeswehr's artillery school in Idar-Oberstein. On 21 June, Ukrainian Minister of Defence Oleksii Reznikov announced that the first PzH 2000s had entered Ukrainian service. Der Spiegel reported on 27 July that Germany had agreed to sell 100 more PzH 2000s to Ukraine. By this time, many PzH 2000 ammo loading mechanisms had broken down due to considerable strain: while the PzH 2000 is designed to fire 100 shells per day, the Ukrainians likely fired the gun much more often. In addition to shipping necessary spare parts to Ukraine, the German government was negotiating the creation of a repair center for its equipment in Poland. In October 2022, the howitzers were sent to Lithuania because Poland denied the German request for exclusive access to the Huta Stalowa Wola facilities, as it would halt all production in the factory (HSW manufactures and services Krab SPGs for Poland and Ukraine, among other weapon systems). Eventually, a planned repair center in Slovakia will shorten the route to and from the war zone in Ukraine. In late 2023, it emerged that Ukraine did not sign the purchase agreement for the delivery of 100 PzH 2000.
In February 2024, Germany announced supporting Ukraine with 18 additional PzH 2000 and 18 more RCH-155.

=== Potential sales ===
Germany (54)
54 additional systems are in discussion as of June 2024, to be supplied to Germany and to Ukraine.

=== Failed bids ===
Australia
The PzH 2000 was a contender for Phase 1C of Australia's Land 17 Artillery Replacement Programme, until that phase of the project was cancelled in May 2012.
Finland
Finland tested a PzH 2000 alongside the 155mm SpGH ZUZANA and AS-90 "Braveheart". Tests ended in 1998; more of the cheaper 155 K 98 field guns were bought instead of self-propelled systems.
Germany - Navy
The German Navy evaluated a modified system known as MONARC for installation onboard frigates; while the system performed well, components were difficult to protect against corrosion. Sweden evaluated a slightly modified version, but selected the Archer Artillery System instead.
Romania (54)
The PzH 2000 participated in the Romanian tracked self-propelled artillery system competition against the Korean K9 Thunder and the Turkish T-155 Fırtına II which included 54 howitzers in total. The Korean offer was the only one to progress in the contract bid, and negotiations between South Korea and Romania were finished in April 2024, with the contract signed in June 2024.
Turkey
In 1999, despite showing interest in K9 Thunder, there was no business deals made as Turkey was planning to produce German Panzerhaubitze 2000 at that time. Another meeting was held on 4 October, regarding K9 production in Turkey and solution for import restriction on MTU Friedrichshafen engines by German government. As Turkey's plan to build PzH2000 eventually became halted by Germany, South Korea and Turkey signed MOU for T-155 Fırtına.
United States
The PzH 2000 was considered for the US Army's Crusader concept system, but several requirements of the Crusader made it unsuitable. The Crusader specifications placed the crew and gun in separate compartments, allowing a single highly armoured crew compartment to control the firing of an entire battery of guns through intervehicle links. In addition, the Crusader included an automated ammunition tender, and an active cooled barrel.

== RCH 155 vs Panzerhaubitze 2000 ==
The RCH 155 (Remote Controlled Howitzer 155 mm) is a wheeled self-propelled howitzer developed by Krauss-Maffei Wegmann (now KNDS Deutschland), a German defence company.

The RCH 155 Module takes the firepower and the range of the Panzerhaubitze 2000 by using its gun (155 mm L/52), and combines it with an automated and remotely controlled gun module. It is the world's first howitzer that can fire while in motion (like i.e. the Leopard 2). This is mainly to avoid enemy counter-artillery fire, as modern counter-battery radars (as COBRA) can reconnoitre fire positions after firing in near real-time.

The crew of the RCH 155 consists of only two people: a commander and a military driver. The Panzerhaubitze 2000 has five: commander, driver, gunner, and two loaders.

== Gallery ==
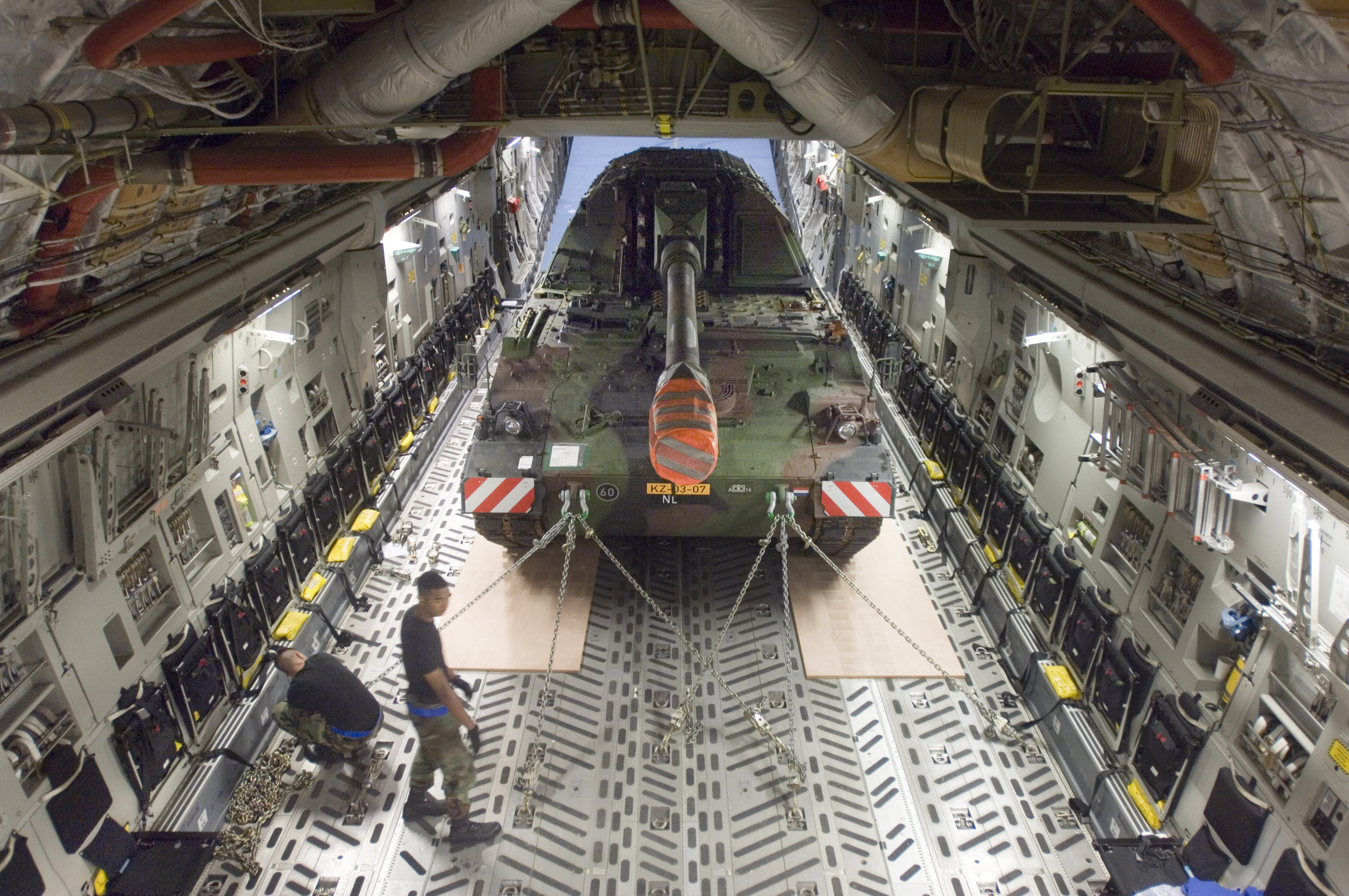
Dutch howitzer being transported to Afghanistan (2006)

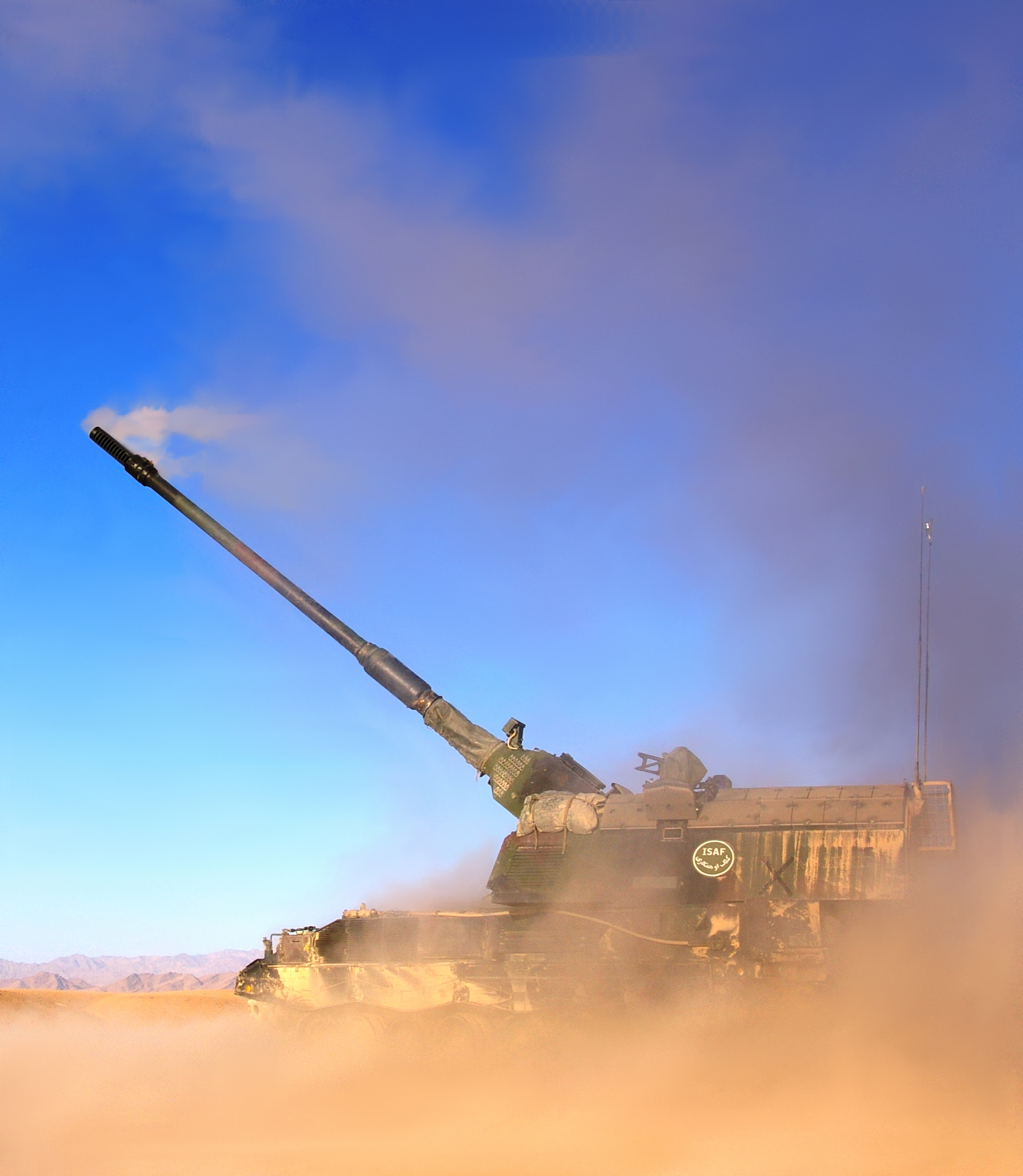
Dutch PzH-2000 firing on targets in Chora. June 16, 2007

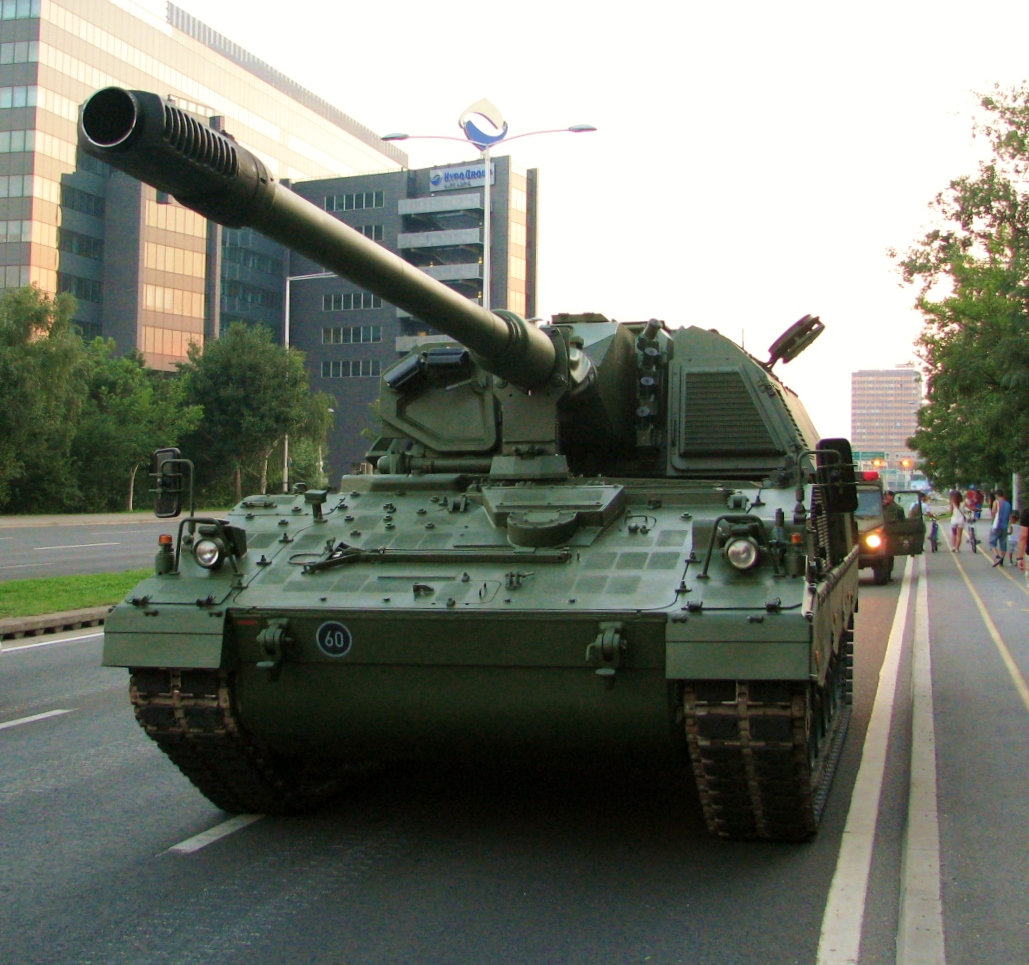
Croatian PzH 2000 at Zagreb Military Parade (2015)

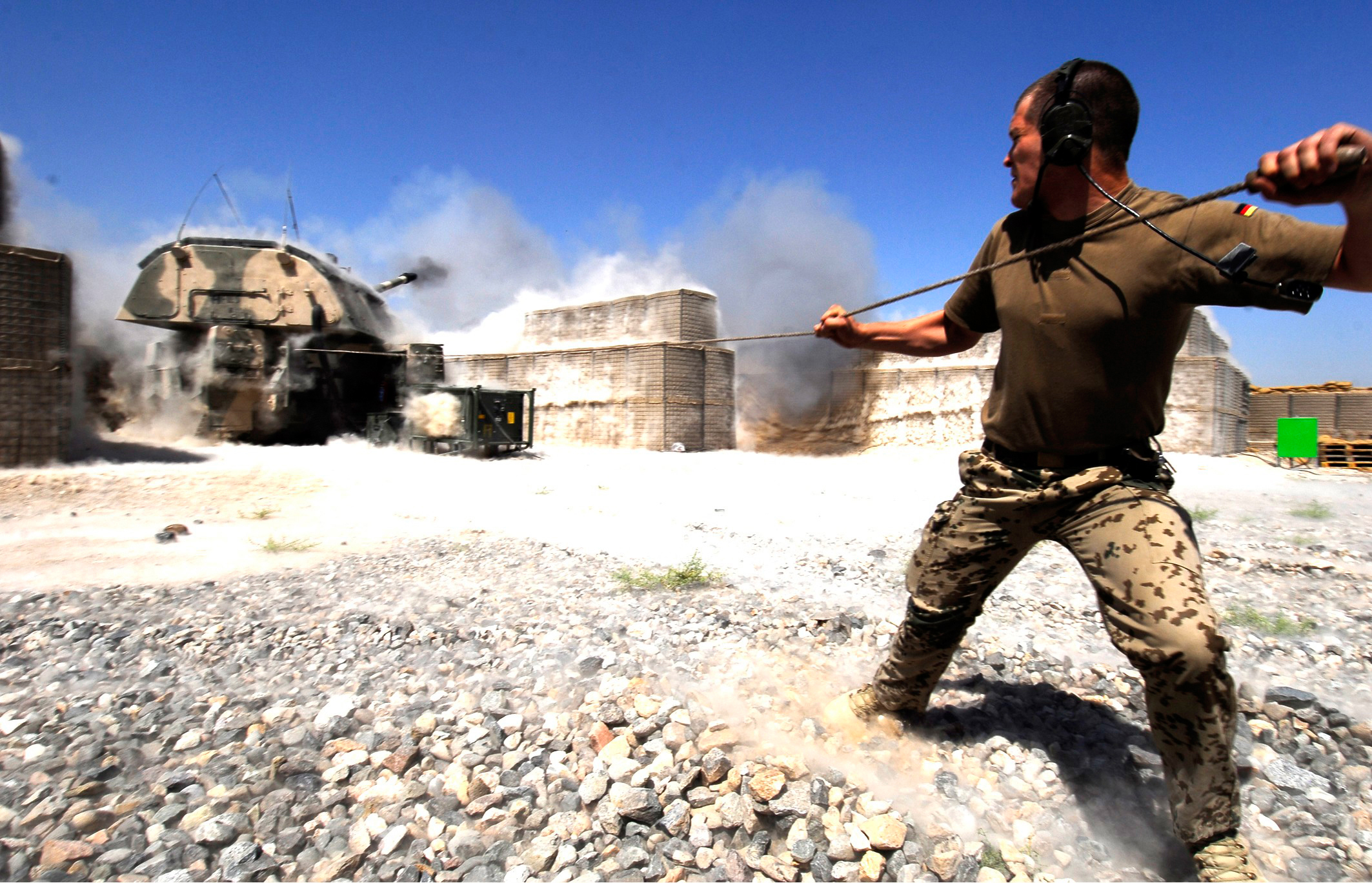
Remote firing of the PzH 2000 by a German Army soldier in Kunduz, Afghanistan (July 2010)

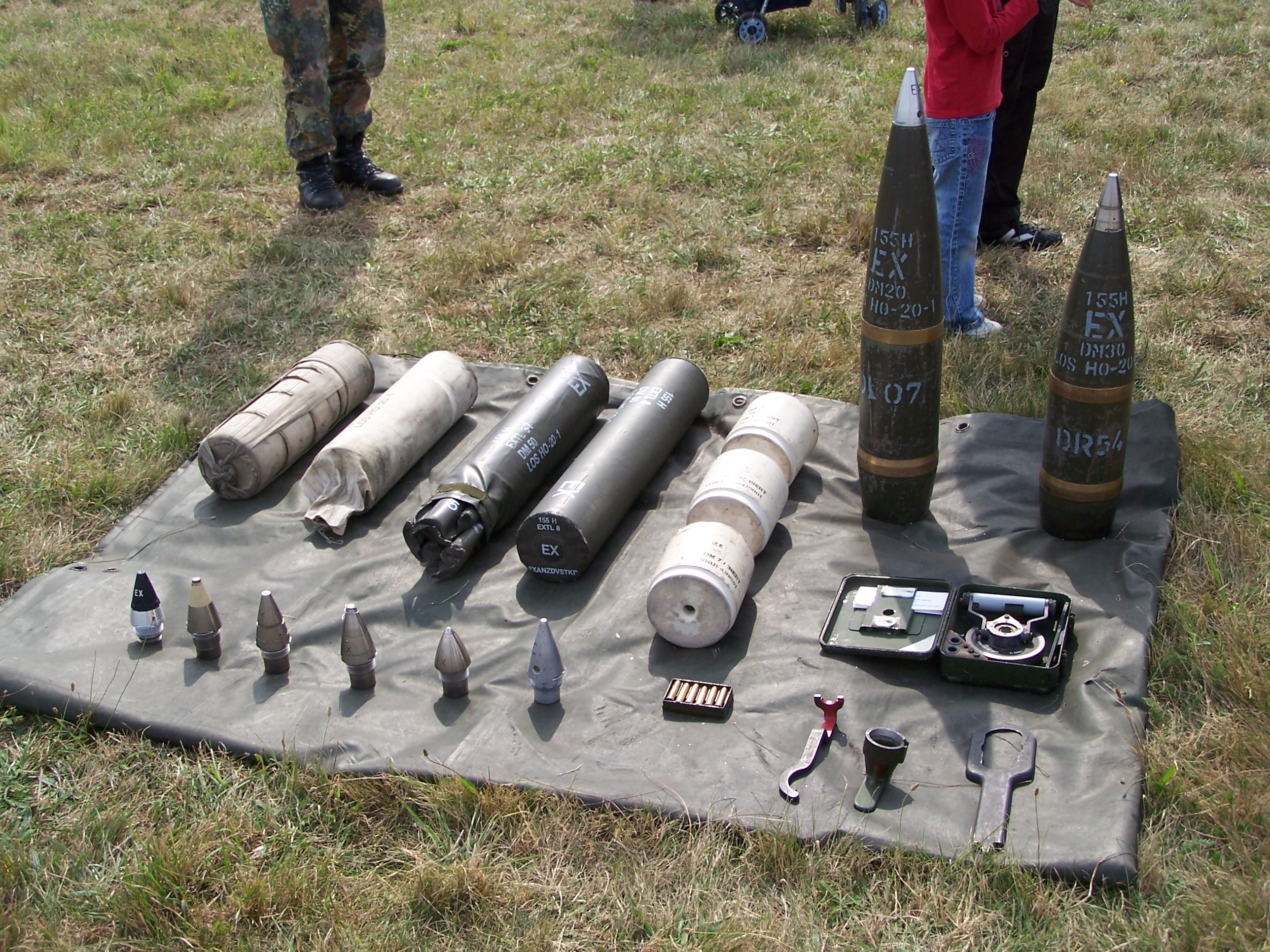
Ammunition

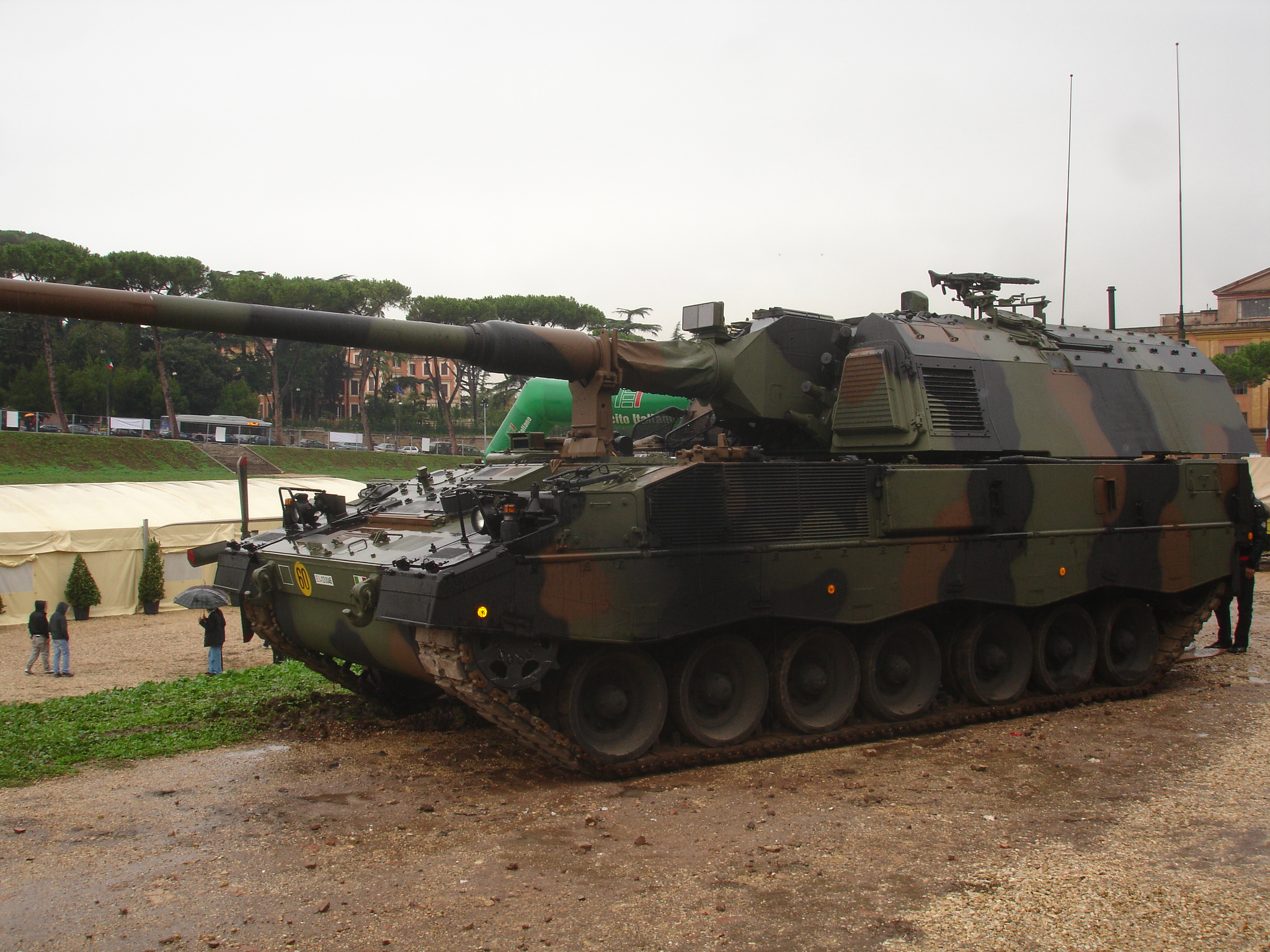
Italian Pzh-2000 on display at Rome's Circus Maximus for the 2009 Army Day

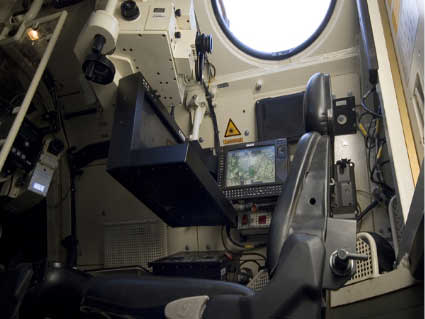
Interior view of an Italian Pzh-2000

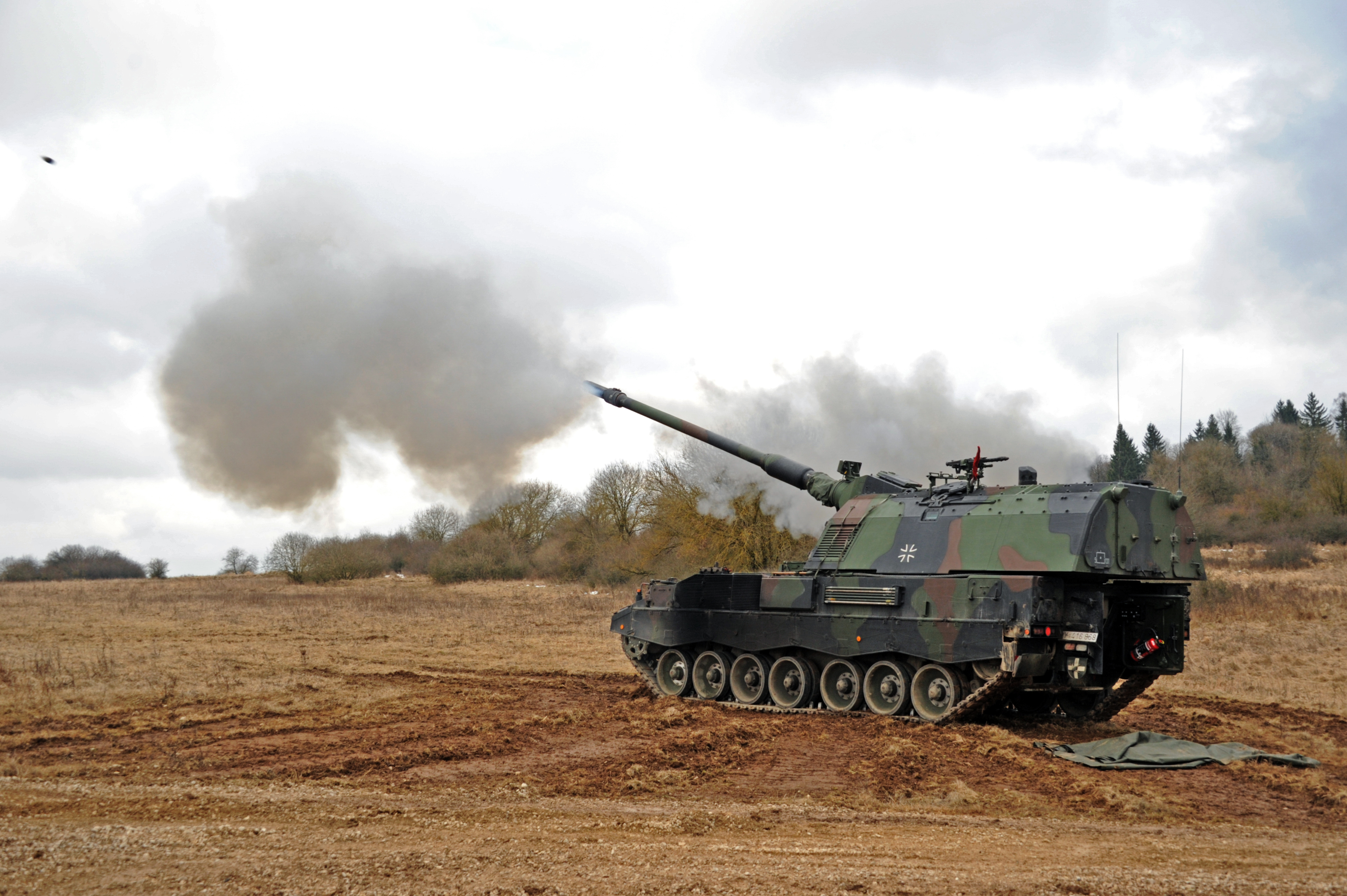
German soldiers with 4th Battery, 131st Artillery Battalion carry out a fire mission with self-propelled howitzers (2018)

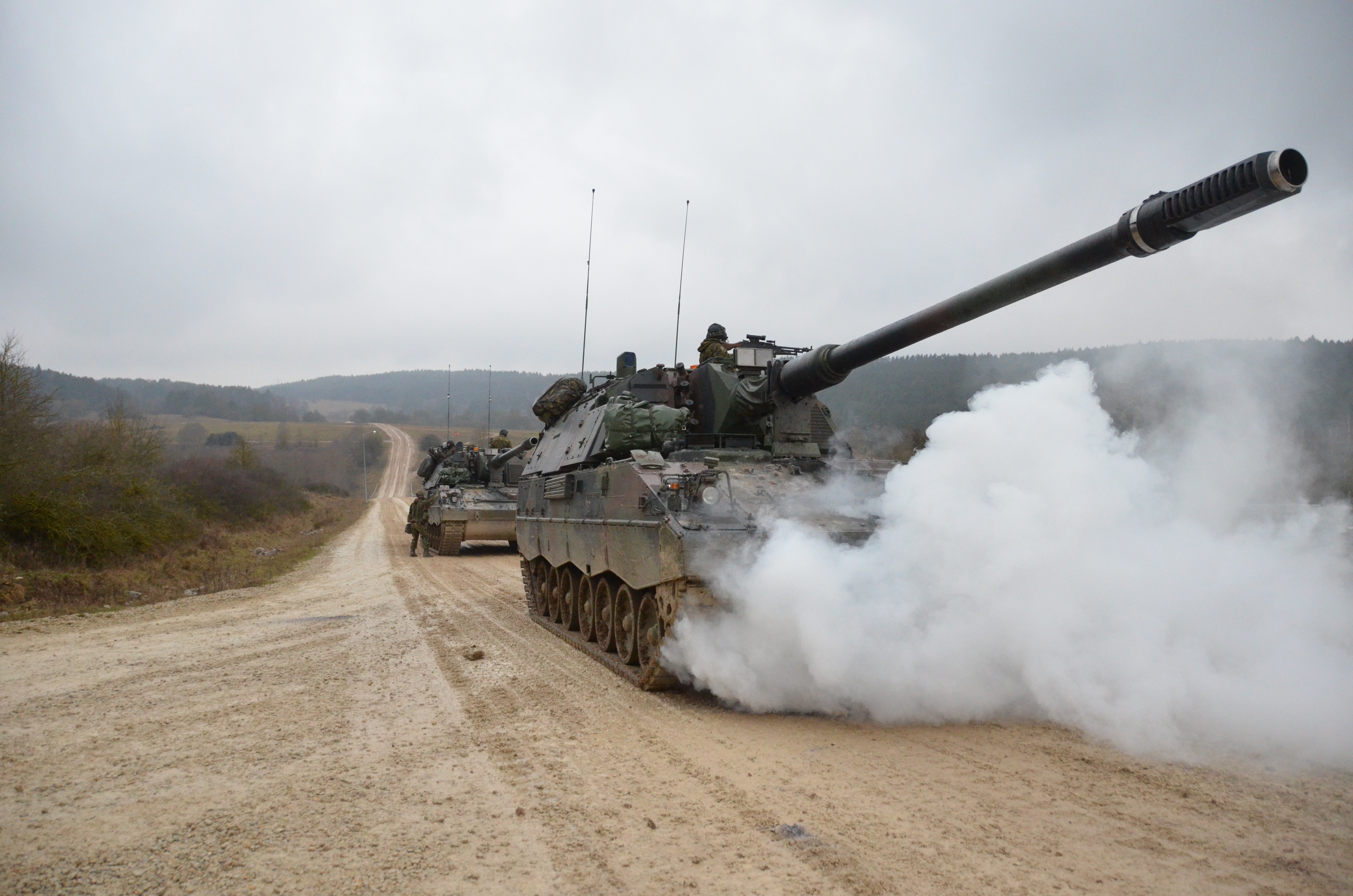
Dutch soldiers of Bravo Battery, Fire Support Battalion drive Panzerhaubitze 2000 into a simulated ambush (2015)

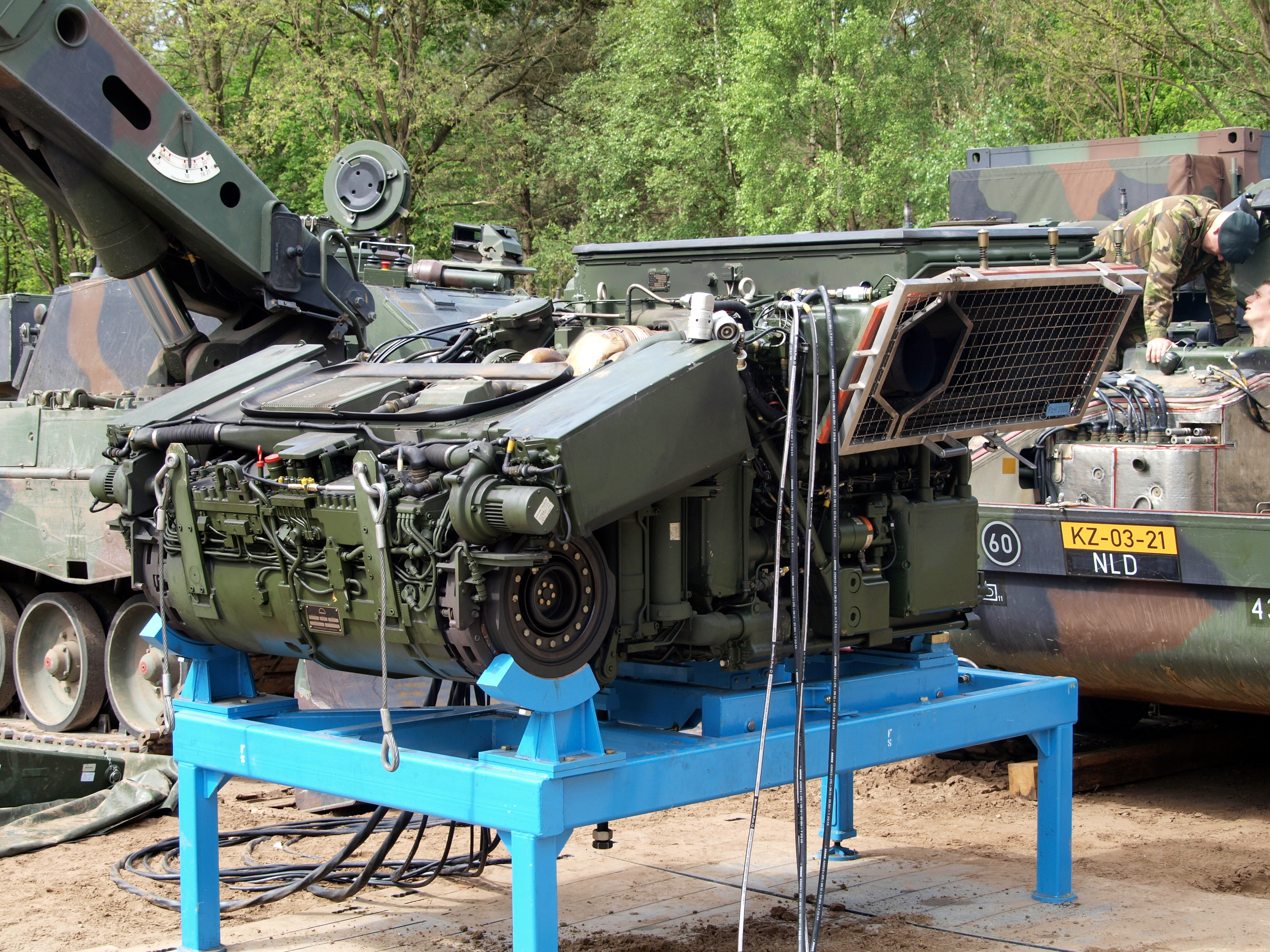
Panzerhaubitze 2000 engine

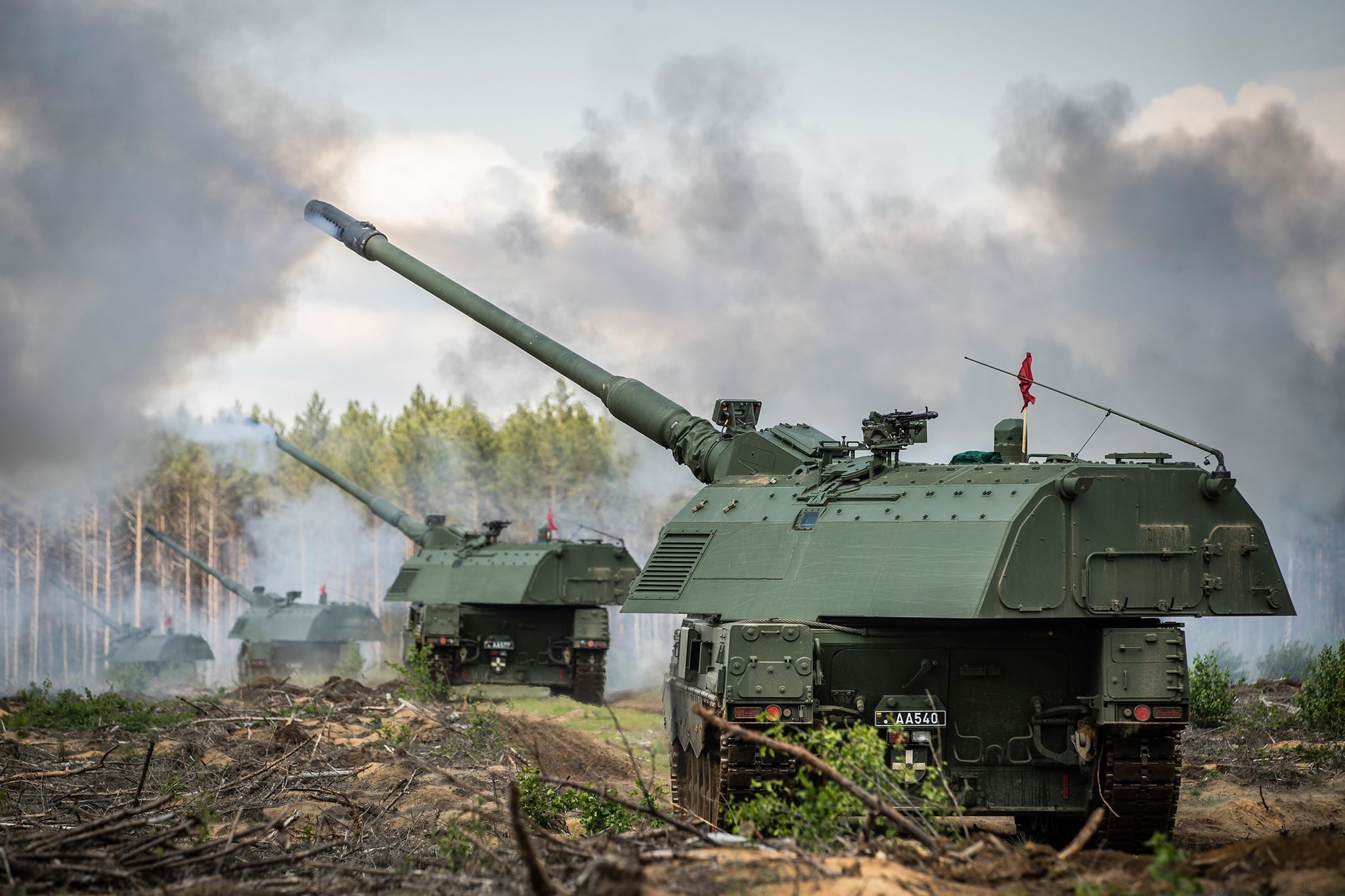
Lithuanian PzH 2000 unit during exercises (August, 2022)

== See also ==
- List of artillery
- Archer Artillery System – (Sweden)
- Artillery Gun Module – (Germany)
- AS-90 – (United Kingdom)
- Bandkanon 1C – (Sweden)
- 2S35 Koalitsiya-SV – (Russia), derived from Msta
- 2S19 Msta-S – (Soviet Union, Russia)
- Type 99 155 mm self-propelled howitzer – (Japan)
- M109 howitzer – (United States)
- CAESAR self-propelled howitzer – (France)
- K9 Thunder – (South Korea)
- AHS Krab – (Poland)
- T-155 Fırtına – (Turkey)
- PLZ-05 – (China)
- SSPH Primus – (Singapore)
- Sholef – (Israel)
