= Operation Halmazag =

Offensive operation in Afghanistan

Coordinates: 36°39′35″N 68°49′54″E

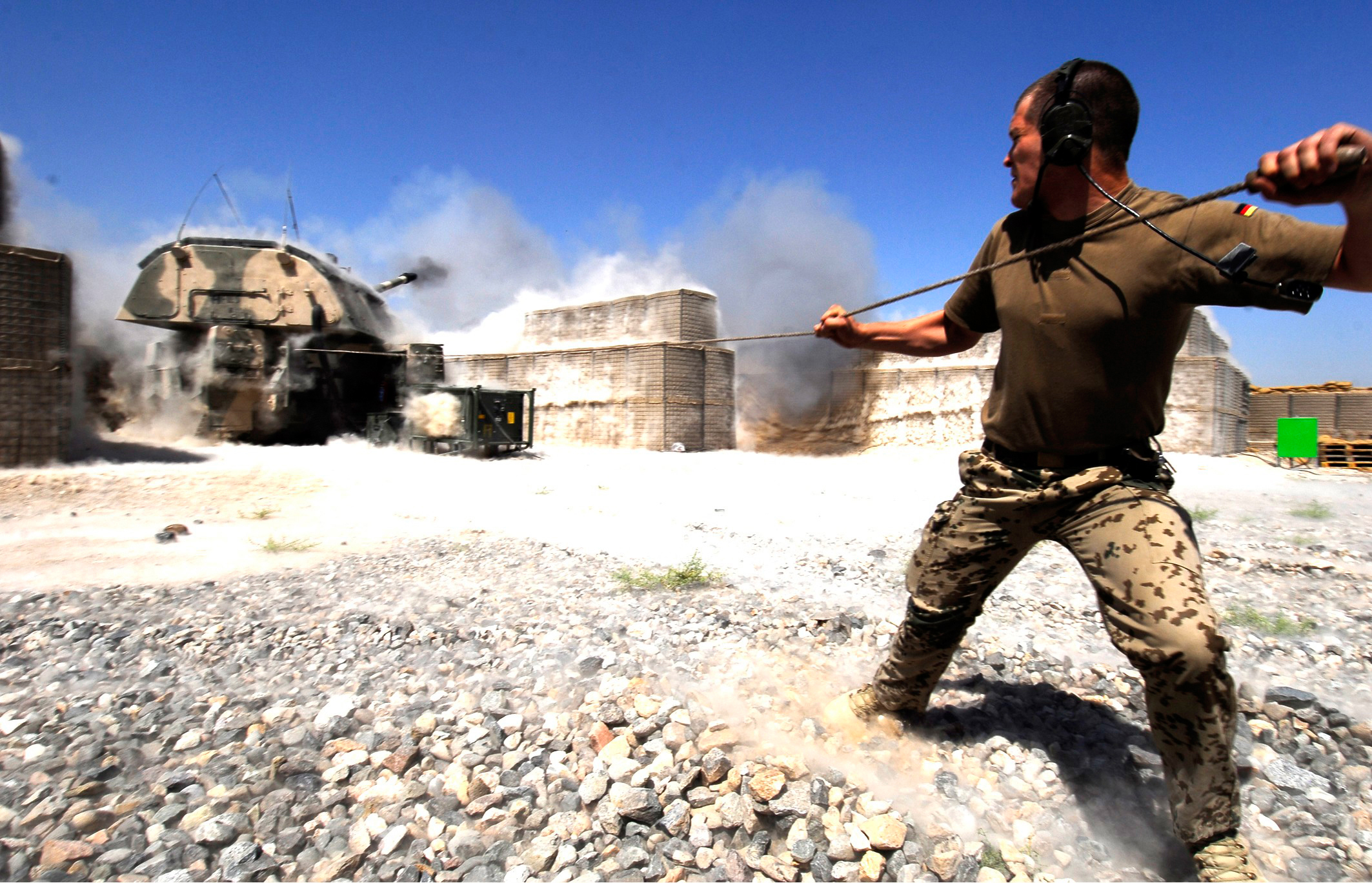
- A German Panzerhaubitze 2000 firing from Kunduz
Date	31 October-4 November 2010
Location	Kunduz Province
Result	Coalition victory

Belligerents
Germany; United States; Islamic Republic of Afghanistan; Belgium	(Afghanistan) Taliban

Commanders and leaders
(Germany) Christian von Blumröder	(Afghanistan) Maulawi Shamsullah

Strength
(Germany) 300 (United States) 150 (Islamic Republic of Afghanistan) 200 (Belgium) Unknown	unknown

Casualties and losses
(Germany) 3 wounded (Germany) 2 AFVs damaged (United States) 3 wounded (United States) 1 minesweeping vehicle damaged (Afghanistan) 3 wounded	12 killed

Operation Halmazag (Dari for "lightning") was an offensive operation by ISAF German-led troops in close cooperation with the Afghan security forces in the province of Kunduz, from 31 October to 4 November 2010, with the aim of building a permanent outpost near the village of Quatliam in the Char Dara district, south-west of Kunduz. The operation was the first German military ground offensive since World War II.

== Background ==
Until 2009, German troops were involved only in a handful of firefights with Taliban militants. Between April and June, the number of direct contacts had already topped the total of the seven years before. A similar development struck Faryab province and the surrounding districts: Having already taken up actions to put the Taliban at rout, Norwegian forces saw themselves increasingly threatened by insurgent activities.

With casualties rising, the German leadership was prompted to revise the rules of engagement for its troops in early 2009. The German military began joint operations with Afghan security forces in accordance to the "Afghan-face" strategy of ISAF in April 2009 and continued to conduct own operations to improve the security as well as supporting other allies in their own struggle. By 2009, there were three major hotspots: the insurgency of the Taliban in Kunduz' Char Dara district, the presence of armed militants in Baghlan province and the militants' activities in Faryab province.

Following the Kunduz airstrike against two captured fuel tankers in September 2009, Germany reclassified the Afghanistan deployment in February 2010 as an "armed conflict within the parameters of international law", allowing German forces to act without risk of prosecution under German law. In early 2010 as well, US troops were poured into Northern Afghanistan and Regional Command North upgraded to be led by a major general in the future.

On 2 April 2010, the largest battle since the fall of the Kunduz in 2001 took place when a large group of insurgents attacked 28 German paratroopers in the vicinity of Isa Khel and a nearby Afghan police station. Three German soldiers died of wounds sustained in combat and eight suffered wounds and injuries of varying degree. Six Afghan troops were killed by friendly fire when the crew of a German infantry fighting vehicle mistook these reinforcements for insurgents. The battle of Isa was the most bloody hostile encounter German troops have been involved in since the end of World War II. Twenty-one troops were honored for their bravery, among them 14 American servicemen of the 158th Aviation Regiment.

== Planning ==
Operation Halmazag was conceived in line with the four-step counterinsurgency doctrine of "Shape-Clear-Hold-Build". This strategy is described in the US Army Field Manual 3-24 Counterinsurgency. The sequence consists in a previous contact with local friendly authorities to convince the population about the advantages of an improving security environment (shape), the elimination of open insurgent activities (clear), taking measures to make impossible the return of open insurgent presence (hold), and securing the effectiveness of the local government and forces to prevent any further insurgent activity (build). Halzamag was the first operation in Afghanistan whose planning and execution was conducted by the Bundeswehr. A key development toward normalization would be the building of a concrete road linking Char Dara with Quatliam and Isa Khel, under the codename "Little Pluto".

The main offensive force was led by the paratrooper battalion 313 (based in Seedorf, Germany). Scouts had learned that in the village Quatliam the support of the Taliban was not as high as in other parts of the area, thus this point would be the main focus of the ground attack. The plan was simple: Afghan police, backed by the US Army 1-87 infantry regiment, would march along the eastern flank, along Kunduz River, toward the village of Isa Khel, while German armored troops would secure the trail between Isa Khel and Quatliam. Then the German paratroopers, reinforced by a unit of the Afghan army, would move in from the north, outflanking the Taliban in Quatliam, with the Afghan army taking positions on the west of the village and the Germans on the east. Afghan militias, supported by 150 American infantry troops, would close the circle from the south, forcing the insurgents to surrender or flee.

== The battle ==
=== 31 October ===
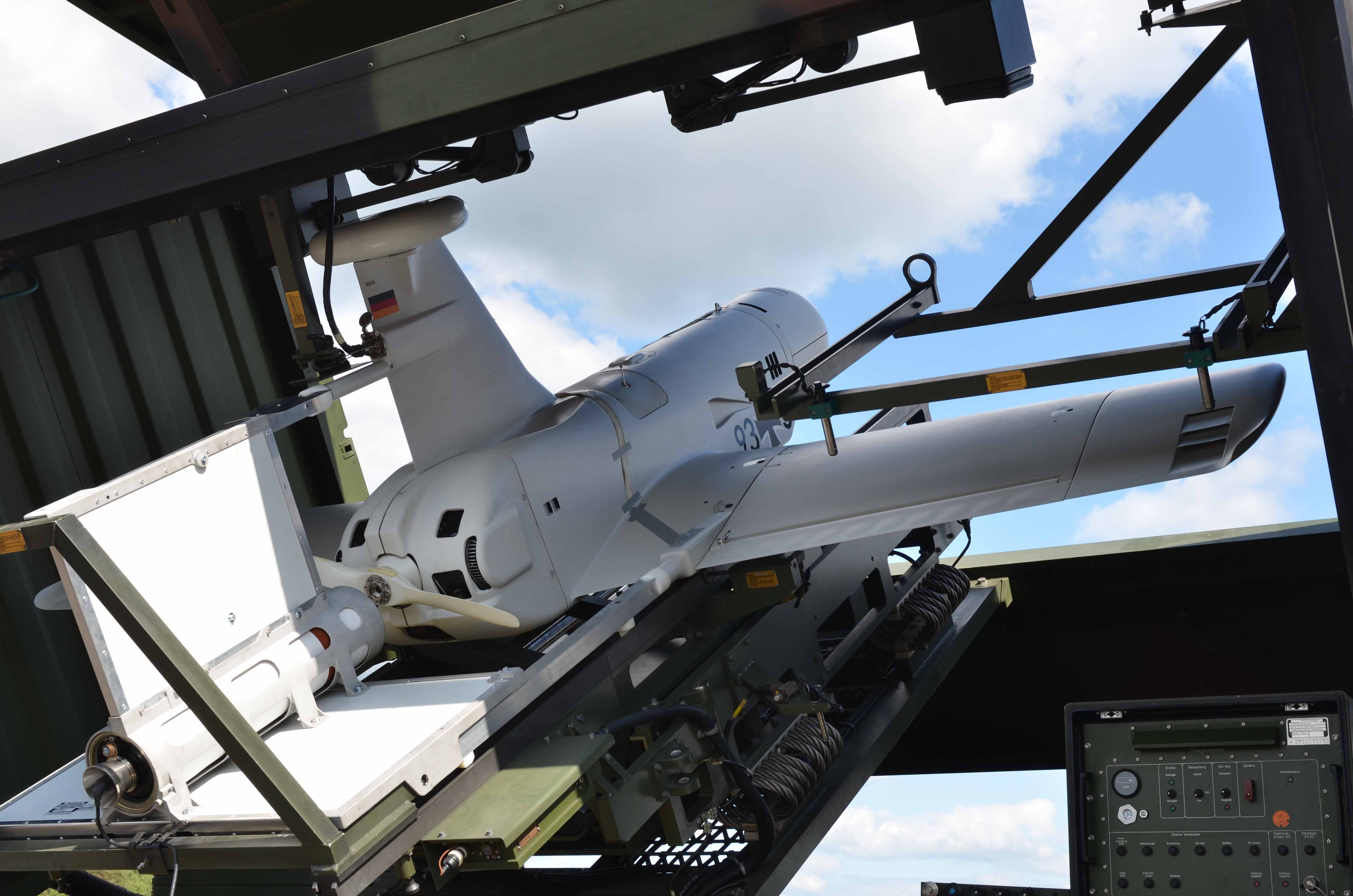
German KZO drone on its launching pad

During the approaching phase of the operation, the insurgents attempted to ambush coalition troops with small arms and antitank weapons. Before closing the grip around the village Quatliam, there were three bomb attacks (IEDs) against US reconnaissance forces from the south and two German Marder armored personnel carriers covering the route between Isa Khel and Quatliam. One American minesweeping vehicle and the armored personnel carriers were damaged in the process and returned to Kunduz. Two German soldiers and three US servicemen were slightly wounded.

During the day another firefight erupted in the vicinity of the location Quatliam without consequences for the German forces. The German Panzerhaubitze 2000 howitzer at Kunduz headquarters provided direct fire support to coalition troops. According to ISAF military intelligence, two insurgents were killed in combat operations on 31 October. Due to the intensity of the fighting, damage assessment in the contested area was carried out only by KZO drones.

The night of 31 October passed quietly. The Panzerhaubitze 2000 in Kunduz loosed flares to illuminate the area west of Isa Khel. The Talibans used to avoid night combat because of the German army night vision capabilities.

=== 1 November ===
Taliban militias attacked coalition troops from Quatliam at dawn, initially with small arms and antitank weapons. West and south of the village several firefights took place in which insurgents also used mortars. No German soldiers were wounded, and the German positions were held. The Panzerhaubitze 2000 was used to shell mortar rebel positions. In addition, close air support (CAS) was used during the light hours.

At the same time, a meeting of the tactical leader of the operation with local authorities was held in Quatliam. According to the information of the Military Intelligence, one insurgent was killed in combat operations on 1 November. Due to the intensity of fighting, damage assessment in the contested area could only be carried out by drones. The forward outpost on "Little Pluto" road could not fully be established due to the insurgents' heavy shelling.

=== 2 November ===
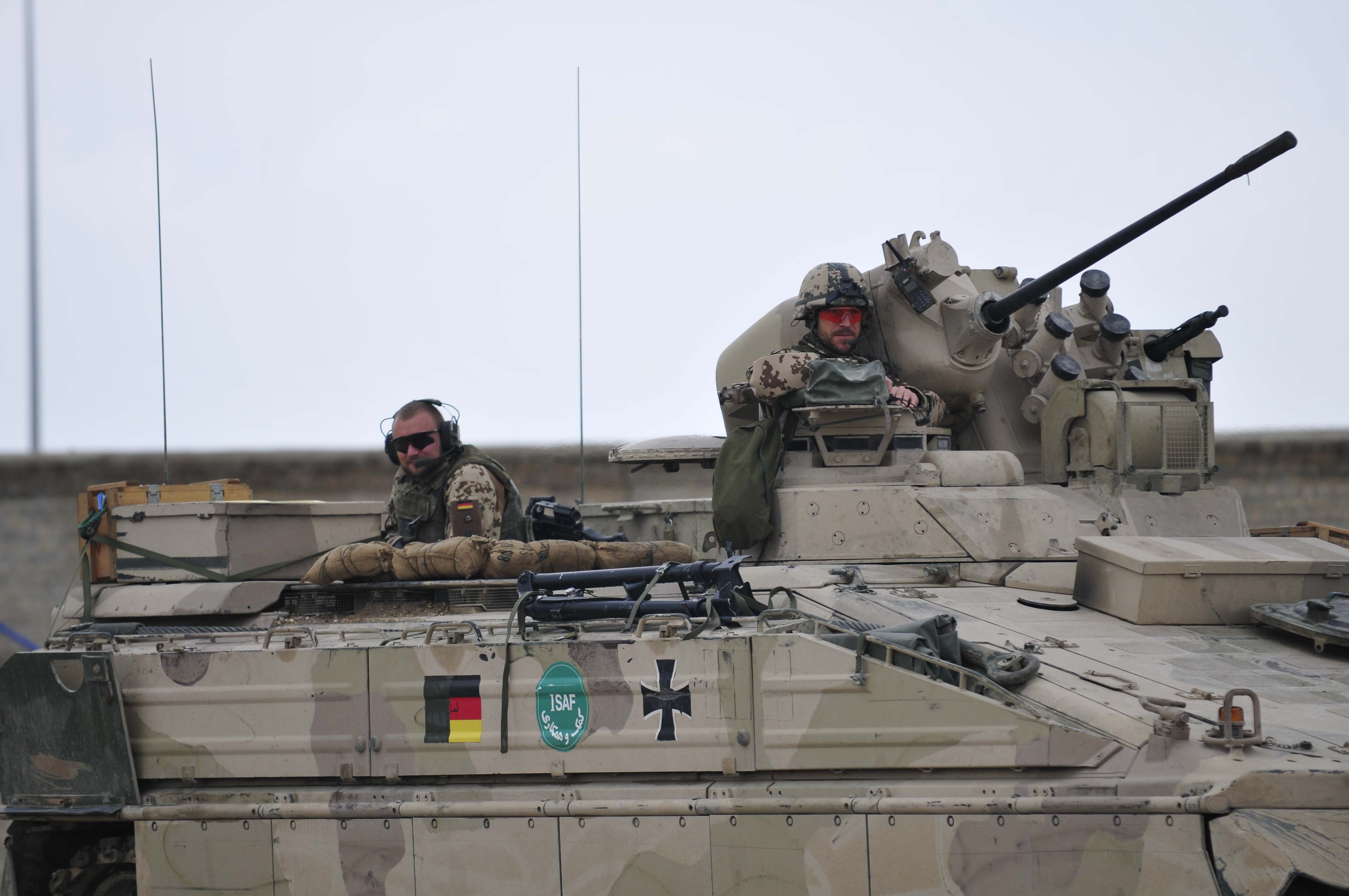
A German Marder Infantry fighting vehicle on patrol near Kunduz

ISAF and Afghan army forces surrounded Quatliam, isolating the insurgents there from Isa Khel. Taliban forces put up fierce resistance along the route between Quatliam and Isa Khel by pounding coalition positions with small arms, rocket propelled grenades and mortars. According to German officials, the rebels used hit-and-run tactics in order to wear down the coalition troops. The Taliban eventually attempted to outflank the German paratroopers in Quatliam, but they were beaten off by a Marder infantry fighting vehicle. In the end, close air support and artillery fire from the Panzerhaubitze 2000 howitzer at Kunduz weakened the insurgents' will to fight. Five militants were killed in action.

A second meeting between Colonel von Blumröder and local elders took place in Quatliam, as heavy fighting was still ongoing. The coalition reached a compromise with the villages' leaders. The local authorities promised full cooperation with ISAF forces in exchange for Quatliam and the surrounding area being supplied with electric power.

Damage assessment of the operational area was once again carried out by drones only, given the persistency of hostile forces on the ground.

=== 3 November ===
Fighting between coalition troops and Taliban militias continued to rage. In several occasions, German paratroopers requested artillery fire from the Panzerhaubitze 2000 howitzer and close air support from USAF F-15 and F-16 aircraft against hostile mortar positions.

North of Quatliam, the insurgents launched an assault on the Afghan police headquarters in Char Dara. The attackers were driven out without major consequences. According to military intelligence reports, four insurgents were killed in action.

=== 4 November ===
On November 4, the police headquarters in Char Dara were reinforced by additional ISAF forces from Kunduz in order to respond to further insurgent attacks. Taliban activity dropped sharply, and died down by evening.

During the night, a unit from the training and protection battalion at Mazar-i-Sharif moved to Quatliam to reinforce the troops employed initially and relieve them later. Taliban forces eventually withdrew from the battle zone toward their strongholds of Imam Sahib in the north and Baghlan in the south. A number of them were caught and taken prisoner by the Afghan police while dressed in burqas in an attempt to hide themselves among the civilian population.

The checkpoint on "Little Pluto" road was eventually established by German engineers. The reconstruction of Quatliam was to be carried out by teams of civil-military cooperation (CIMIC) . ISAF troops cleared the streets of makeshift explosive devices (IED). Tips to find the explosive devices and neutralize them usually come from the local population. The ordnance was destroyed with controlled explosions in situ by German engineers.

The German minister of defence, Karl-Theodor zu Guttenberg, paid a brief visit to German troops at Char Dara.

== Aftermath ==
Once the main combat operation was over, ISAF established outposts in the village of Quatliam and along the supply road "Little Pluto", manned first by German forces who would then gradually hand over the job to Afghan security forces. According to the operational doctrine of the ISAF, this marked the beginning of the "hold" phase, in which the conquered territory is maintained and rebuilt under constant presence of security forces with the support of development and aid organizations.

Further meetings were held with the elders of Quatliam and the surrounding villages to promote the rebuilding process. The works to connect Quatliam and the surrounding villages to the main power lines again were already underway. The development project was funded by the German Federal Ministry of Foreign Affairs. The German training and protection battalion from Kunduz was then deployed to patrol and ensure freedom of movement along the logistic route "Chimney" -between Kunduz and Char Dara- and the heights 431 and 432, an operation codenamed "Sher Chesan".
