= List of equipment of the Norwegian Army =

This is a list of equipment of the Norwegian Army currently in service and on order.

Note: This list is indicative only, as strict comparisons cannot accurately be made.

== Personal equipment ==
=== Clothing and equipment ===
Model	Image	Origin	Pattern type	Environment / colours	Notes
Norsk Skog		Norway	Disruptive	Temperate / central Europe	Standard camouflage pattern of the Norwegian Army.
Ørkenkamuflasje		Norway	Disruptive	Arid / desert	Same pattern as Norsk Skog, but other colours, used on operations abroad.
M23 - N08 Norsk skog		Norway	Disruptive and Flecktarn pattern mix	Temperate / central Europe	Norwegian variant of the NCU. It is a modular uniform system. Progressive Introduction since January 2025 across the Armed Forces. A new pattern was developed by the Norwegian Defence Research Establishment based on imagery data: Norsk skog (which means Norwegian forest); First entry (for operations abroad); Vinterkamuflasje (winter camo)
M23 - First entry		Norway	Disruptive and Flecktarn pattern mix	Desert / arid	Norwegian variant of the NCU. It is a modular uniform system. Progressive Introduction since January 2025 across the Armed Forces. A new pattern was developed by the Norwegian Defence Research Establishment based on imagery data: Norsk skog (which means Norwegian forest); First entry (for operations abroad); Vinterkamuflasje (winter camo)
M23 - Vinterkamuflasje		Norway	Disruptive pattern	Snow / winter	Norwegian variant of the NCU. It is a modular uniform system. Progressive Introduction since January 2025 across the Armed Forces. A new pattern was developed by the Norwegian Defence Research Establishment based on imagery data: Norsk skog (which means Norwegian forest); First entry (for operations abroad); Vinterkamuflasje (winter camo)

=== Protection equipment ===
Model	Image	Origin	Type	Notes
Helmet
Kevlarhjelm Soldat 2000 "Bøtte hjelmen"		Norway	Ballistic helmet, style kevlar helmet	Being phased out by M24 and Ops Core FAST. This helmet was manufactured by Cato Ringstad. It remains in service with certain companies and the Norwegian Home Guard. Some were also donated to Ukraine.
Ops-Core FAST "Stridshjelm M/12"		United States	Ballistic helmet	Tender won in September 2011 to supply new helmets to the Norwegian Armed Forces. It became the standard issue combat helmet. It is being replaced by the M24.
Galvion Batlskin Caiman "Stridshjelm M24"	Illustration	Canada	Ballistic helmet	New standard issue combat helmet. They come with additional equipment: hearing protection; glasses; lights; Norwegian camo (Norwegian forest, first entry, winter) helmet cover; UN blue helmet cover
Vest
NFM BA "M07"		Norway	Ballistic vest	Former standard issue combat vest. Being replaced Some remain in service, and some were donated to Ukraine.
NFM THOR MCVS "M22"		Norway	Ballistic vest	New standard issue combat vest. It succeeds to the M07 & the M10. 22,000 were delivered by the end of 2024. It uses the grid vest system.
NFM Bear 2 BA "Stridsvest M10"		Norway	Combat vest	Standard issue combat vest of most of the Home Guard & most conscripts. It succeeds to the CV1 vest. It is used as a combat vest / ammunition carrier. Its colour is brown. It offers no ballistic protection.
– "M13"		–	Plate carrier	Limited protection. Used as a combat vest / ammunition carrier by special forces.
NFM "M08"		Norway	Tactical vest / plate carrier	Modular body armour vest. Used by special forces
NFM Trym QRS "M11"		Norway	Tactical vest / plate carrier	Modular body armour vest, with a quick release system. Used by special forces
NFM Heidrun "M14"		Norway	Tactical vest / plate carrier	Used as ammunition carrier / no protection. Used by infantry soldiers.

=== Individual and crew served weapons ===
Model	Image	Origin	Type	Calibre	Notes
Pistols
Glock 17 "P80"		Austria	Handgun	9×19mm Parabellum	Standard issue sidearm. Norwegian version of the Glock 17 pistol. Currently being modernized to the new Gen 4 standard.
Submachine guns
Heckler & Koch MP7		Germany	Submachine gun, PDW	HK 4.6×30mm	Replaced most of the HK MP5.
Heckler & Koch MP5 A2N and A3N		West Germany	Submachine gun	9×19mm Parabellum	Mostly replaced by the MP7. The variants A2N and A3N in service with: Forsvarets Spesialkommando (special operations forces); Heimevernet (Home Guard).
Assault rifles
Heckler & Koch HK416		Germany	Assault rifle	5.56×45mm NATO	Standard rifle of the Norwegian Army which replaced the AG3 and AG3F1, 42,000 rifles purchased. The variants include HK416N, HK416K and HK416S. Accessories: Red dot: Aimpoint CompM4; Sight: Elcan SpecterDR 1-4×; AN/PEQ-2 laser module; Underbarrel grip
Colt Canada C8		Canada	Assault rifle, Carbine	5.56×45mm NATO	The C8 SFW and C8 CQB are in service with Forsvarets Spesialkommando.
Machine guns
FN Minimi		Belgium	Light machine gun	5.56×45mm NATO	In service with Forsvarets Spesialkommando and KJK since the early 2000s.
FN Minimi Para		Belgium	Light machine gun	5.56×45mm NATO	In 2011, the Minimi was also selected as the new light machine gun of the Norwegian Armed Forces, and an order was placed with FN for 1,900 weapons. Accessories: Sight: Elcan SpecterDR 1-4×
Minimi MK3		Belgium	General purpose medium machine gun	7.62×51mm NATO	1,000 received in 2022 (with 3,000 more on option). The Norwegian Defence Materiel Agency signed the contract with FN Herstal in August 2021.
FN MAG		Belgium	General purpose medium machine gun	7.62×51mm NATO	Installed on Leopard 2 tanks purchased from the Netherlands and used on other vehicles and weapon stations, replacing the MG3. It was used as an infantry machine gun, but was replaced by the Minimi and the Minimi MK3.
M2 Browning		United States	Heavy machine gun	12.7×99mm NATO (.50 BMG)	In January 2019, the Norwegian Armed Forces ordered 1,000 new M2A2N, which will replace the older M2. The need expressed might reach up to 1,300 machine guns in total.
Precision rifles
Heckler & Koch HK417		Germany	Designated marksman rifle	7.62×51mm NATO	Replaced the NM149 in the Norwegian Armed Forces.
Barrett MRAD		United States	Sniper rifle	8.6×70mm (.338 Lapua Magnum)	Ordered in 2013, delivered from 2015 for both the Army and the Forsvarets Spesialkommando.
Barrett M82 A1 NG		United States	Anti materiel sniper rifle	12.7×99mm NATO (.50 BMG)	
M107A1		United States	Anti materiel sniper rifle	12.7×99mm NATO (.50 BMG)	Contract for "several hundred rifles" signed in June 2024. Deliveries expected in 2025.
Shotguns
Benelli M4		Italy	Pump action shotgun	12 gauge	Used by the special forces
Ceremonial Weapons
M1 Garand "Selvladegevær"		United States	Semi-automatic rifle	.30-06 Springfield	Used by Hans Majestet Kongens Garde 3rd Guard Company's drill troop
Grenade
Heckler & Koch M320 "AG-HK416"		Germany	Grenade launcher	40×46mm LV	Both used under barrel of the HK416 or as a single weapon.
Heckler & Koch GMG		Germany	Automatic grenade launcher	40×53mm HV	Already fitted on some vehicles. Complementary order in November 2025 (€21.42 million / NOK 250 million).
Anti-tank weapons
Carl Gustav recoilless rifle		Sweden	Recoilless rifle	84mm	M2 / M3 / M4 variants operational Ammo types: HE; Anti-armour; Smoke; Illumination; Training
M72 LAW		Norway United States	RPG Rocket-propelled grenade	66mm	The NM72F1 is the most common variant in the Norwegian Army. A M72-S training variant is used by the Army.
FGM-148 Javelin		United States	ATGM Anti-tank guided missile	127mm	100 command and launch unit + 526 missiles, delivered from 2006, in use from 2009. 120 more missiles ordered and new kits for the command and launch unit in 2021. In 2017, Norwegian authorities started the process of finding a replacement anti-tank weapon in order to counter new types of heavy tanks equipped with active protection systems capable of defeating current anti-tank missiles.
Mines
M19 Claymore	—	United States	Light anti-personnel mines	—	
M100 Claymore		United States	Heavy anti-personnel mines	—	
Man-portable air-defense system
PPZR Piorun		Poland	MANPADS Man-portable air-defense system	72mm 50 systems in use. 175 systems on order	Successor of the RBS 70 system. Ordered in November 2022, valued at NOK 350 million, first batch delivered in December 2023. Additional order signed in August 2026.

== Armoured vehicles ==
=== Armoured fighting vehicles ===
Model	Image	Origin	Type	Quantity	Notes
Main battle tank 38 in use (+52 on order)
Leopard 2A4 NO		West Germany	Main battle tank	36	52 acquired second hand from the Netherlands in 2001. The tanks were modified, including among others the Norwegian battle management system, new radios and a weapons rack. Status of the tanks: 36 tanks remain in service, 8 were transformed in a Leguan AVLB; 8 donated to Ukraine; Will be replaced by the Leopard 2A8 in the Brigade N, these 36 tanks will be used in Finmarkbrigaden as an armed support.
Leopard 2A8 NOR		Germany; Norway	Main battle tank	2 (+52 on order, and an option for +18)	Competition for the successor of the Leopard 2A4 between the Leopard 2A7 and the K2 Black Panther. Thee Leopard 2A7 was selected in February 2023. But in the end, the contract was signed for the Leopard 2A8 to have commonality with allies like Germany. Ritek will assemble 37 of the 54 tanks ordered. Delivery planned for 2026 - 2030: First tank rolled out of manufacturing facility in November 2025.; 2 delivered in April 2026
Tracked armoured vehicles
CV90 Mk I	CV90RWS STING CV90RWS Multi BK	Sweden; Norway	Multi-role armoured tracked vehicle	54 (quantity repeated in each category)	104 purchased in 1994 in IFV variant (CV9030N). 17 were upgraded to the CV9030NF1 standard for international mission, 1 was damaged by an IED and not repaired. In 2012, a decision was made to reuse the turret for new CV90 hulls, and 34 of the hulls would be used for the following roles: 16 combat engineering vehicles (CV90RWS STING); 16 multi-role / mortar (CV90RWS Multi BK); 2 driver training vehicles; In 2014, 37 Mk I hulls sold to Estonia. In 2021, additional Mk I hulls would be used for the following roles: 12 combat engineering vehicles (CV90RWS STING); 8 multi-role / mortar (CV90RWS Multi BK); As of 2024, 12 MkI hulls remain unused.
CV90 Mk IIIb		Norway; Sweden	IFV (Infantry fighting vehicle)	74	110 new hulls purchased in 2012, and 103 turret modernised from CV9030N purchased in 1994 + 7 new turrets purchased. Equipment: For the 3 variants: rubber tracks, E30 turret, M153 Protector RWS.; RECCE variant: rear mounted telescopic mast with Rheinmetall Vingtaqs II target acquisition and reconnaissance system (radar + camera + IR); C2: 3 command consoles + 1 standard IFV turret
CV90 Mk IIIb "Vingtaqs II"		Norway; Sweden	RECCE (Reconnaissance / scout vehicle)	21	110 new hulls purchased in 2012, and 103 turret modernised from CV9030N purchased in 1994 + 7 new turrets purchased. Equipment: For the 3 variants: rubber tracks, E30 turret, M153 Protector RWS.; RECCE variant: rear mounted telescopic mast with Rheinmetall Vingtaqs II target acquisition and reconnaissance system (radar + camera + IR); C2: 3 command consoles + 1 standard IFV turret
CV90 Mk IIIb "STRILED"		Norway; Sweden	C2 (Command and control vehicle)	15	110 new hulls purchased in 2012, and 103 turret modernised from CV9030N purchased in 1994 + 7 new turrets purchased. Equipment: For the 3 variants: rubber tracks, E30 turret, M153 Protector RWS.; RECCE variant: rear mounted telescopic mast with Rheinmetall Vingtaqs II target acquisition and reconnaissance system (radar + camera + IR); C2: 3 command consoles + 1 standard IFV turret
ACSV G5		Germany (design and production) Norway (assembled)	Multi-role vehicle and APC Armoured personnel carrier	0 (+ 50 in service planned for 2023 - 2027)	Designed and parts produced by FFG, assembled by Ritek in Norway. Variants ordered / planned: M548 successor (2 variants): Variant 1: capacity for a 10 ft ISO container; Variant 2: capacity for a 6.5 ft ISO container and a 5 ton-crane; an electronic warfare variant; Mentioned in other sections: 7 × ACSV G5 - ARV; 6 × NOMADS GBAD; 8 × Ground Master 200 MM/C radar; 75–150 planned further acquisition.
M113A2, M113F3		United States	Multi-role vehicle and APC Armoured personnel carrier	288	In service since 1964. Today, they fill various support roles such as command vehicle, armoured ambulance, engineer vehicle. 288 vehicles have been rebuilt and upgraded as a part of Project 5026, including at least 97 M113F3s. 20 APCs donated to Ukraine in 2025.
NM201 "Ildlederpanservogn, artilleri"		United States	Artillery forward observer	14 (in 2015)	M113A2-based vehicle for artillery forward observers. It is fitted with the VINTAQS observation system on a 2m mast. It consists of a thermal camera, VingRange laser range finder, VingEye CCD-camera and GPS.
Wheeled armoured vehicles
Sisu XA-185		Finland	Multi-role vehicle and APC; Armoured personnel carrier	1	19 acquired between 1994 and 1996. Of these 9 were armoured ambulances, while 10 were APCs. Later all were converted to armoured ambulances. 18 donated to Ukraine in 2025.
Sisu XA-186		Finland (design); Norway (manufactured)	Multi-role vehicle and APC; Armoured personnel carrier	16	22 delivered between 1994 and 1996: 18 APC (Armoured personnel carrier); 2 C2 (Command and control vehicle); 1 armoured ambulance; 1 repair vehicle; 6 APC-vehicles donated to Ukraine in 2025. These vehicles are not amphibious.
SISU XA-203N		Finland (design and made); Germany (ambulance modifications)	Armoured ambulance	34	The NDMA commissioned FFG in 2016 to convert 30 APC and command vehicles into "multi-role medical platform". This vehicle replaces the Sisu XA-185 ambulances. The first delivery took place in 2019, and entered service with the Army in 2020.
Patria 6×6		Finland	Armoured command vehicle	0 (+20 on order)	Norway joined the CAVS programme in September 2025. In August 2026, the Norwegian Army ordered 20 armoured command vehicles (C2 Command and Control variants armed with Kongsberg PROTECTOR RS4 Remote Weapon Stations) with an option for additional 40.
Iveco LMV2, LMV3, LMV4		Italy	Infantry mobility vehicle	169	In service since 2007. About 110 vehicles, mostly newer LMV3s and brand new LMV4s, will be kept in active service or placed in emergency storage, while the older LMV2s will be retired completely. 14 LMV III donated to Ukraine in July 2022.
High mobility vehicle
Supacat HMT Extenda		United Kingdom	High mobility vehicle	24	HMT Extenda MK2s intended for Norwegian Special Operations Forces. Delivery completed in May 2019.

=== Engineering and support vehicles ===
Model	Image	Origin	Type	Quantity	Notes
Recovery vehicles
Bergepanzer 2 NM217 Bergepanservogn		West Germany	ARV Armoured recovery vehicle	11	Armored recovery vehicles based on the Leopard 1 chassis. Known as NM217 in Norwegian service. 13 acquired. 2 donated to Ukraine.
WiSENT 2 ARV NOR		Germany	ARV Armoured recovery vehicle	8 (+ 4 on order)	Based on the Leopard 2, supplied by FFG. Vehicle optimised to support the Leopard 2 MBT. Purchases with the Programme P5430: 6 ordered in May 2016, received by 2020 (€42 million); 3 ordered in June 2023, to be received in 2026-27; 3 ordered in September 2026; System specifications: Interchangeable between Wisent 2 ARV and AEV; Towing hooks for the Leopard 2; Crane to lift the turret and the engine of the Leopard 2; Kongsberg Protector with M2 Browning.
FFG ACSV G5 - ARV		Germany Norway United States	ARV Armoured recovery vehicle	0 (+ 7 ordered + 2 option)	MITE (Miller Industries Towing Equipment) will supply the recovery modules intended to recover vehicles weighing from 5 to 25 tons. Order in June 2023. Delivery from 2027.
Scania P113 "NM154 F2 / F3 / F4"	(Illustration)	Sweden	Wrecker truck	18	Delivered in 2012–2013, based on existing Scania 113 trucks. Designed to tow and assist the modernised CV90. All are upgraded towing/lifting capacity, and an upgraded cabin. Some upgrades are specific to each variant: 12 NM154 F2 (base upgraded variant); 2 NM154 F3 (rescue equipment + prepared for add-on armour); 4 NM154 F4 (international operations with armoured cabin and anti-IED jammers); Capacity: 35 tons towing capacity from a tow-bar.; 11 tons towing with suspended load.; Two winches: Main winch, 20 tons; Self-rescue winch, 10 tons; Norway had 92 NM154.
Engineering vehicles
WiSENT 2 AEV NOR		Germany	AEV Armoured engineering vehicle	6 (+ 11 on order)	Based on the Leopard 2, supplied by FFG. Part of the Programme 5049.: 6 ordered in September 2018, delivery started in 2021 (f€45 million).; 8 ordered in June 2023, delivery in 2026–27.; 3 ordered in 2024.; System specifications: Interchangeable between Wisent 2 ARV and AEV; Engineering tools; Kongsberg Protector with M2 Browning.
Pionierpanzer 2 Dachs "NM189 Ingeniørpanservogn"		West Germany	AEV Armoured engineering vehicle	14	Based on the Leopard 1 chassis. 22 acquired in 1995, contract with Hägglunds Moelv. 2 donated to Ukraine in 2023, another 3 in 2024 and another 3 in 2025.
CV90 Mk I "CV90 RWS STING"		Sweden	Sapper vehicles	28	Combat engineering vehicle that replaced the NM205.: 16 ordered in 2012; 12 ordered in February 2021 (based on MkI hulls to be upgraded); Equipment: M153 Protector RWS; Surface Mine Ploughs (supplied by Pearson Engineering); Mine roller ("Self Protection Combat Roller" supplied by Pearson Engineering)
Hydrema MCV 910		Denmark	Mine clearing vehicle	8	Mine clearing vehicle designed for military and peacekeeping operations.
Bridging equipment
Biber AVLB "NM190 Broleggerpanservogn"		West Germany	AVLB Armoured vehicle-launched bridge	9	Based on the Leopard 1. Initially equipped with a Biber bridge laying system. Modernised with the Leguan system with a contract with MAN 1996.
Leopard 2 - Leguan bridge layer		Germany	AVLB Armoured vehicle-launched bridge	5 (+ 3 remaining for delivery)	Based on the Leopard 2A4 that were in reserve in the Norwegian Army. Successor to the NM190, reusing the Leguan bridges from the modernised Biber. As of December 2023, 5 had been delivered, remaining 3 to be delivered by 2027. Additional bridges will be purchased (MLC80 (about 72 tons) with a length of 26 metres, or alternatively two bridges with a length of 14 metres), and a Leguan training simulators and a peripheral package.
Acrow Wet Gap bridges / Zremb		Poland United States	Bridge	11	Delivery in 2021 Bridge capacity: MLC 80/110
M3 Amphibious Rig		Germany	Floating bridge/Ferry		Delivery in 2026/2027/2028. Bridge capacity: MLC ?
NBC force
TPz Fuchs 1A8		West Germany	NBC reconnaissance vehicle	6	In service with the Army's CBRN units.
Driver training vehicles
CV90 Mk I		Sweden	Driver training	2	Based on CV90 Mk I hull, ordered in April 2012.

== Indirect fire ==
=== Rocket artillery ===
Model	Image	Origin	Type	Calibre	Quantity	Notes
K239 "Gungnir" (Odin's spear)		South Korea	MLRS Multiple launch rocket system	—	0 (+ 16 on order)	Orders: 16 in 2026, with deliveries planned from 2028 to 2031

=== Tube artillery ===
Model	Image	Origin	Type	Calibre	Quantity	Notes
K9 VIDAR "Versatile InDirect ARtillery system"		South Korea	SPH Self propelled howitzer	155mm L/52	28 (+ 24 on order)	Successor of the M109. Orders: 24 K9A1 in 2017 (+ option for 24); 4 K9A1 in 2022; 24 K9A1 in 2025; Deliveries: 24 in 2019-2020; 4 in December 2024
K10		South Korea	Ammunition resupply vehicle	—	14	Support of the K9 VIDAR: Orders: 6 K10 in 2017; 8 K10 in 2022; Deliveries: 6 in 2019-2020; 8 in December 2024

=== Mortar ===
Model	Image	Origin	Type	Calibre	Quantity	Notes
CV90RWS Multi BK		Sweden Norway United Kingdom	Multi-role AFV (logistics vehicles or mortar carrier)	81 mm	24	Successor of the NM204 with a dual role logistics / mortar carrier. Orders: 16 in 2012; 8 in 2021 (based on MkI hulls to be upgraded); The CV90 Mk I hull was modified by Ritek A/S and armed with: VingPos Mortar Weapon System outfitted with an 81 mm L16A2 mortar, supplied by Rheinmetall Norway.; Kongsberg Protector RWS
L16A2 81mm NM95		United Kingdom Canada	Infantry mortar (Infantry crew served mortar)	81 mm	143 (2021)	Mortar used by the infantry, and also used with mortar carriers such as the CV90RWS Multi BK. Other infantry transport vehicles carry the mortar for the infantry (BV206).

=== Observation equipment ===
Model	Image	Origin	Type	Quantity	Notes
Safran MOSKITO TI™ Wärmebildgerät Medium Range 19 (WBG MR 19)		Switzerland	Multifunction IR goggles (laser range finder, laser pointer, compass, inclinometers)	—	Ordered in 2018.
Safran JIM Compact™ Wärmebildgerät Long Range 19 (WBG LR 19, sensor for TASYS SMALL)		Switzerland	Multifunction IR goggles (laser range finder, laser pointer, GPS, inclinometers)	—	Ordered in 2018.

== Unarmoured vehicles ==
=== Utility vehicles ===
Model	Image	Origin	Type	Quantity	Notes
Mercedes-Benz G290 Multi III		Germany Austria	Light patrol vehicle	Unknown	Modified multi-role vehicle based on the Mercedes-Benz G-Class. 30 vehicles have also been delivered to the Home Guard (with another 30 to follow).
Mercedes-Benz G240 GD (W461)		Germany Austria	Utility vehicles	3,000	
Mercedes-Benz G270 (W460)		Germany Austria	Ambulance	–	
Toyota Land Cruiser		Japan	Special forces vehicle	–	
Hägglunds Bandvagn 206		Sweden	Articulated vehicle	970	970 as of 2024 669 of these are upgraded.

=== Light vehicles ===
Model	Image	Origin	Manufacturer	Quantity	Notes
Off-road vehicles
Polaris MRZR 4		United States	ATV All terrain vehicle	–	
Polaris Sportsman 6WD ATV		United States	ATV All terrain vehicle	–	Used by Norwegian Special Operations Forces.
Lynx Outlander 6×6 Army		Finland Canada	ATV All terrain vehicle	100	Used by Norwegian Special Operations Forces.
Motorcycles
Yamaha WR450		Japan	Enduro motorcycle	–	
Snowmobiles
BRP Lynx Yeti Pro V800		Finland	Snowmobiles	–	
BRP Lynx 5900		Finland	Snowmobiles	–	
BRP Lynx 6900		Finland	Snowmobiles	–	
BRP Lynx Commander 800R E-TEC		Finland	Snowmobiles	200	

=== Logistics vehicles ===
Model	Image	Origin	Manufacturer	Quantity	Notes
MAN TGS		Germany Austria	Semi-truck	56	Common agreement with Sweden in 2014. Order in August 2022: 56 semi trucks (6×6)(Some were ordered for the air force earlier, used on air fields and bases)
MAN TGS		Germany Austria	Tactical trucks with hooklift hoist	85	Common agreement with Sweden in 2014. Order in August 2022: 29 4×4 and 6×6 trucks(some were ordered for the air force earlier, used on air fields and bases)
MAN TG3 MIL 8×8		Germany Austria	Tactical trucks with hooklift hoist	0 (+ 284)	Order in June 2023, delivery planned for 2026-27 (€168 million).
RMMV HX2		Germany Austria	Tactical trucks	103	Common order with Sweden in 2014. Orders: 95 HX2 8×8; 8 HX2 10×10; Within the 103 trucks, 35 received the Rheinmetall Integrated Armoured Cabin (IAC).
RMMV HX2 8×8		Germany Austria	Tactical trucks with hooklift hoist	24	Order August 2022.
Scania P93, p113, P142, NM412, NM154		Sweden	Tactical trucks	~ 2,000	
Scania P460 4×2	(illustration)	Sweden	Fuel tanker	0 (+ 8 and + 30)	
Scania G460 6×4	(illustration)	Sweden	Fuel tanker	0 (+ 8 and + 30)	

== Air defence systems ==
Model	Image	Origin	Type	Quantity	Note
NASAMS III / IV	.	Norway United States	Surface-to-air missile fire units	3 batteries + 4	Fire units orders: 2006: NASAMS II; 2019: NASAMS III; 2024: NASAMS III (replacement donation Ukraine); 1 × in January; 1 × in June; 2 × in December; Other orders: 2 × simulators in 2024; Planned orders (2024): AIM-120 C8 missiles; Spare parts; Modernisation contract November 2025 (NOK 1 billion): Kongsberg FDC (Fire Distribution Center, replacement of the current ones); Wheeled communication nodes and radios.; Kongsberg Thor Combat Net Radio (replacement of the MRR radio); Additional components ordered
NOMADS ACSV G5 NASAMS		Norway Germany United States	Surface-to-air missile	6	6 ordered in 2019, 4 handed over in 2024, not yet operational. Missile used with the system: AIM-9X Block II.

== Radars ==
Model	Image	Origin	Type	Quantity	Notes
AN / TPY-4		United States Norway	Multi-mission radar, Long range detection AESA radar with GaN TRM	10 (+ 30 in option)	Platform Electronic System is built by Kongsberg Defence & Aerospace. Orders: 8 radars in November 2022 (with option for 3 more radars); 3 radars in September 2024 (option exercised)
Saab ARTHUR		Sweden	C-RAM radar	—	12 radars received between 1999 and 2002. Radars installed on Bv-206. Modernised in 2015 by Saab Technologies Norway AS, latest sensor variant used, the ModC. A C2 system joins the ARTHUR in a 10-foot shelter on a M113 F4. Being replaced by the Ground Master 200 MM/C. 3 radars transferred to Ukraine in 2023.
Ground Master 200 MM/C		Netherlands	3D Surveillance radar and C-RAM radar	8 ordered	3D AESA radar purchased in collaboration with the Netherlands to be installed on the PMMC G5. Orders: 5 radars in May 2021; 3 radars in November 2022 (option activated)
Raytheon MPQ-64F1 Sentinel		United States	Air defence radar	24	
Weibel Scientific XENTA-M MFSR-2100/33		Denmark	SHORAD air defence radar	6	To equip NOMADS ground-based air defence system.
Thales Squire		Netherlands	Man-portable ground surveillance radar	44	Purchased in 2013.

== Unmanned aerial vehicles ==
Model	Image	Origin	Type	Role	Quantity	Notes
Black Hornet Nano		Norway	Micro multicopter UAV Unmanned aerial vehicle	ISR Intelligence, surveillance, and reconnaissance	5000-10000	First in the army since 2015. Complementary purchase of Black Hornet 3 in 2022, delivery since 2023. Contract worth NOK475 millions.
Aerovironment RQ-12A Wasp IV		United States	Fixed-wing low altitude UAV Unmanned aerial vehicle	ISR Intelligence, surveillance, and reconnaissance	—	It succeeded to the RQ-11B Raven.
Aerovironment RQ-20B Puma AE II		United States	Fixed-wing low altitude UAV Unmanned aerial vehicle	ISR Intelligence, surveillance, and reconnaissance	—	It succeeded to the RQ-11B Raven.
Lockheed Martin Indago 3 Drone	(illustration picture)	United States	Mini-UAV, Multicopter	ISR Intelligence, surveillance, and reconnaissance	10 (+ 30 in option)	
Skydio X10D		United States	Mini-UAV, Multicopter	ISR Intelligence, surveillance, and reconnaissance	1000 in service 1500–2000 on order	AI + fast produktion Ordered in 2024, first received in 2025, contract worth USD $9.4 million. These take NAMMO warhead against small boats or trucks. These take out enemy drones also.
Meteomatics MM-B4-O		Switzerland	Mini-UAV, Multicopter	Weather drone	30	Base and drone.

== Medical ==
Model	Origin	Manufacturer	Notes
K9 Hero	United States	US Kforce Government Solutions (KGS)	Electronic dog doll, used to train medical personnel in treatment of K9s.

== Other equipment ==
Model	Origin	Type	Quantity	Notes
Volvo EC350ENL Heavy excavator	Sweden	Volvo	2	
Kewatec Aluboat	Finland	Kewatec BEB 750	12	Tugboats / transport for the army
K9 Modular Vest System	Norway United States United Kingdom	The Norwegian Defence Material Agencie, Aspetto, Visual Engineering and Recon-K9	n/a	
Forward Repair System NATO (FRSN)	Denmark	GLAUCUS APS	n/a	

== Reserve ==
Model	Image	Origin	Type	Quantity	Notes
Multiple launch rocket systems
M270 Multiple Launch Rocket System		United States	Multiple launch rocket system	1 (mothballed)	Taken out of active service in 2005, and have been sitting in storage since then. This was largely a result of Norway signing the Convention on Cluster Munitions, as well as not being able to afford to upgrade the system to fire M31 GMLRS at the time. In 2014, a decision was made to scrap the M270s, but it was halted before it could be carried out. 12 acquired. 3 donated to Ukraine via UK in June 2022 Another 8 donated in May 2023.
Self-propelled gun
M109A3GN		United States	Self-propelled gun	33 in storage (2023)	126 M109Gs were acquired from West Germany between 1969 and 1971. They were then upgraded to the M109A3GN configuration during the latter half of the 1980s. In 2006, there were still 56 M109A3GNs in the Army's inventory, meaning that at least 70 SPGs had been scrapped after the end of the Cold War. 14 M109A3GNs received additional upgrades in 2007, and were designated M109A3GNM. The upgrade includes, among other things, new intercom and new navigation and positioning systems. The M109A3GNMs were the only SPGs that remained in active service (12 with Brigade Nord's Artillery Battalion and 2 with the Norwegian Army Weapons School) with the remainder of the M109s having been put in storage by 2006. 22+1 donated to Ukraine in 2022
