= SLAMRAAM =

Surface-to-air missile adapted from air-to-air weapon

- Type: Surface-to-air missile system
- Place of origin: United States

Service history
- In service: 2008–2011
- Used by: United States Army (planned)
- Wars: None (program canceled before deployment)

Production history
- Designer: Raytheon, Kongsberg Defence & Aerospace
- Manufacturer: Raytheon, Kongsberg Defence & Aerospace
- Unit cost: Approximately $623 million (program cost)
- Variants: SLAMRAAM-ER (Extended Range)

Specifications
- Mass: Approximately 150 kg (missile)
- Length: 3.66 m (missile)
- Diameter: 0.18 m (missile)
- Engine: Solid-fuel rocket motor
- Maximum speed: Mach 4
- Guidance system: Inertial guidance with active radar homing
- Launch platform: Humvee (M1152A1 HMMWV), HIMARS

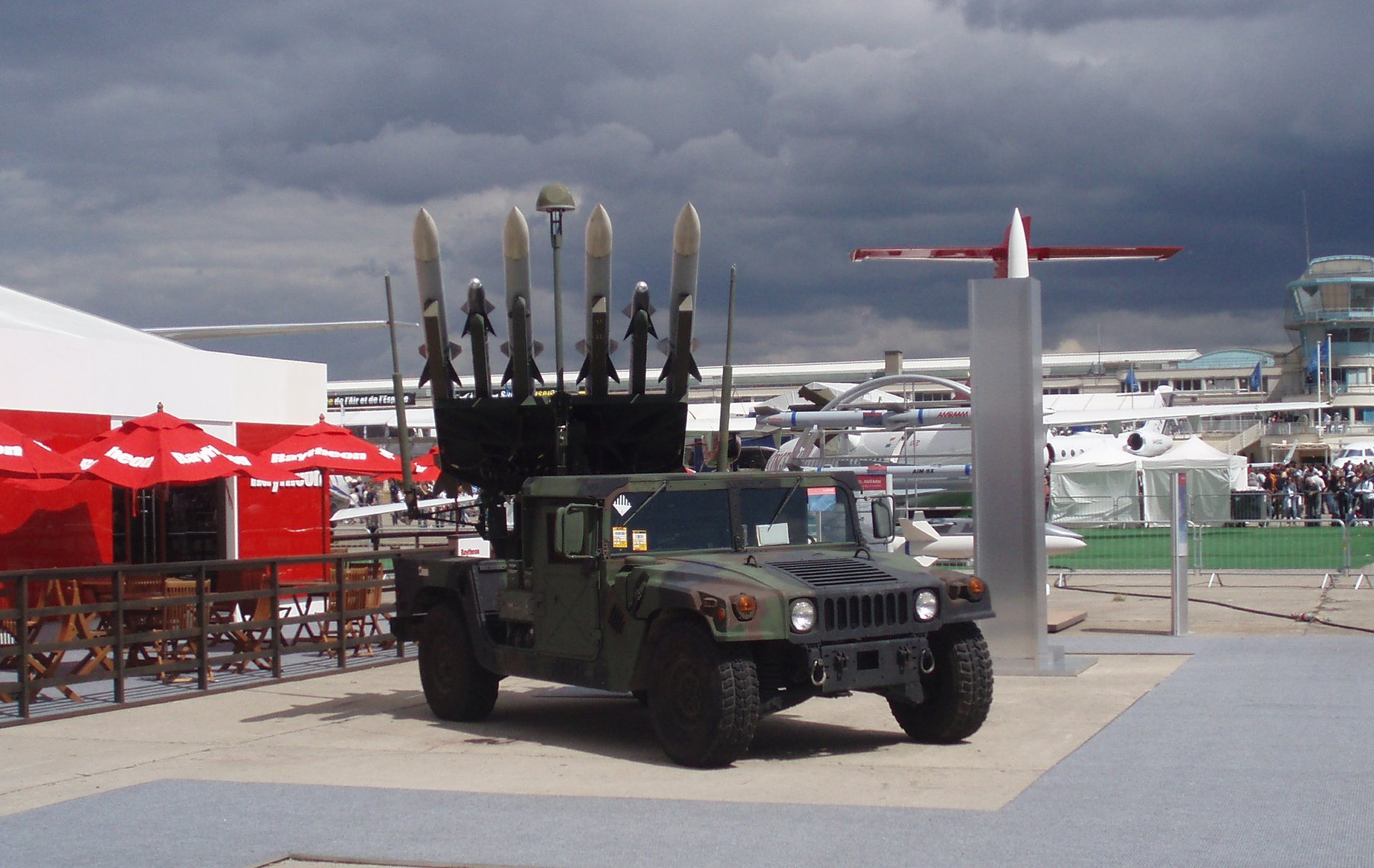
Battery of four SL-AMRAAM and two AIM-9X on HMMWV in 2007.

The SLAMRAAM (Surface Launched Advanced Medium-Range Air-to-Air Missile, or AMRAAM), formerly CLAWS (Complementary Low Altitude Weapon System), was the United States Army program to develop a Humvee-based surface-to-air missile launcher for the AIM-120 AMRAAM missile, manufactured by Raytheon Technologies and Kongsberg Defence & Aerospace. Surface-launched AMRAAM missiles were first used in Kongsberg's NASAMS air defense system, fielded in 1995.

Although the US Army canceled the SLAMRAAM program in 2011, the mobile launcher became part of NASAMS configuration options.

== History ==
The Norwegian Advanced Surface-to-Air Missile System (NASAMS), developed by Kongsberg Defence & Aerospace, consists of a number of vehicle-pulled batteries (containing six AMRAAM launch containers each) along with separate radar trucks and control station vehicles.

The US Marine Corps conducted trial of surface-launched AMRAAM missiles during 1997, demonstrating intercept ranges of over 15 km. In April 2001, the Marines awarded Raytheon a contract for the development of the Complementary Low-Altitude Weapon System (CLAWS), with Kongsberg Defence & Aerospace as a subcontractor and Boeing as the developer of fire and control shelter. In 2006, the USMC terminated the CLAWS program as part of spending cuts.

In February 2004, the US Army Aviation and Missile Command awarded Raytheon a contract to develop SL-AMRAAM. In 2007-2008, Raytheon successfully tested launching AMRAAM missiles from a six-missile launch rails on a M1097 Humvee. They also added the capability to fire AIM-9X Sidewinder from the launcher. The missiles receive their initial guidance information from a radar not mounted on the vehicle.

In 2008, the United Arab Emirates (UAE) has requested the purchasing of SLAMRAAM as part of a larger 7 billion dollar foreign military sales package; the sale would include 288 AMRAAM C-7 missiles.

In 2009 the US Army test fired the SL-AMRAAM from a HIMARS artillery rocket launcher as a common launcher, as part of a move to switch to a larger and more survivable launch platform.

Since the missile is launched without the benefit of an aircraft's speed or high altitude, its range is considerably shorter. Although the engagement range for AMRAAM is estimated to be 75 km for AIM-120B and over 105 km for AIM-120C-5, these ranges are provided for head-on encounters by fast moving aircraft at an altitude, and the range is significantly shorter when the same missiles are launched from stationary ground platforms. Further dimensioning for a stationary ground-launched-missile system is its maximum altitude reach, which by rule of thumb is one third of its maximum horizontal range.

=== Cancellation ===
On January 6, 2011, Secretary of Defense Robert Gates announced that the U.S. Army has decided to terminate acquisition of the SLAMRAAM as part of a budget-cutting effort.

The National Guard Association of the United States has sent a letter asking for the United States Senate to stop the Army's plan to drop the SLAMRAAM program because without it there would be no path to modernize the Guard's AN/TWQ-1 Avenger Battalions.

== High Mobility Launcher ==
A more recent version of the SLAMRAAM program is the NASAMS High Mobility Launcher made in cooperation with Kongsberg, where the launch-vehicle is a Humvee (M1152A1 HMMWV), containing four AMRAAMs and two AIM-9X Sidewinder Block II each. First HML launchers were delivered to the Norwegian Army in 2013.

== See also ==
- Hisar
- MBDA MICA VL
- MBDA CAMM missiles
- Surface-to-air systems using variants of the CAMM missile:
  - Italian Army: Grifo, with the CAMM-ER missile
  - Italian Air Force: MAADS (Medium Advanced Air Defence System) with the CAMM-ER missile
  - British Army: Sky Sabre, with the CAMM missile
  - Polish Air Force: Mala Narew, with the CAMM missile
  - Polish Air Force: Narew, with the CAMM-ER missile
- NASAMS
- NOMADS
- IRIS-T SLM
