= IRIS-T SL =

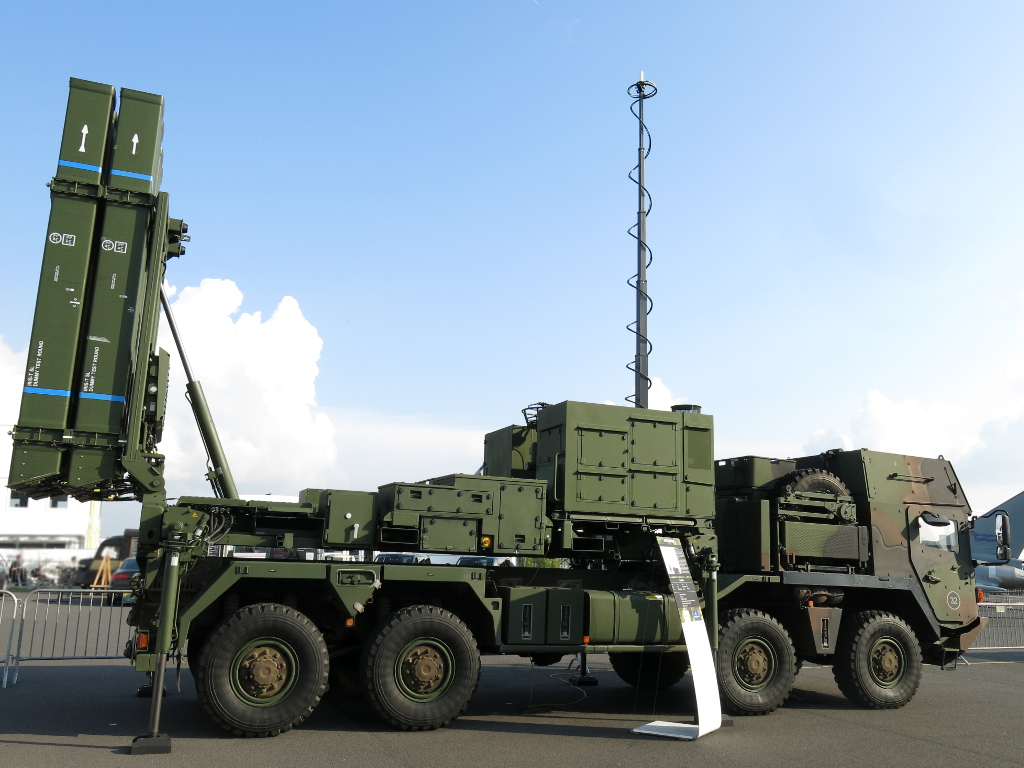
- IRIS-T SLM TEL
- Type: Surface-to-air missile
- Place of origin: Germany, Sweden

Service history
- In service: 2020
- Used by: See operators
- Wars: Russo-Ukrainian War

Production history
- Designed: Since 2007
- Manufacturer: Diehl Defence (lead); Hensoldt, Saab AB
- Developed from: IRIS-T air-to-air missile
- Unit cost: Fire units: IRIS-T SLM: €140 million (FY 2022); Missiles: IRIS-T SLS: €400,000 (~US$400,000); IRIS-T SLM: Germany: €250,000; Other countries: €400,000 to €564,608
- Produced: Since 2020
- Variants: Variants in service:IRIS-T SLS, IRIS-T SLM; Variants in development: IRIS-T SLX, Naval surface-to-air missile

Specifications
- Mass: IRIS-T SLS missile 87.4 kg (193 lb); IRIS-T SLM missile 130 kg (290 lb)
- Length: IRIS-T SLS missile 2.94 m (9.6 ft); IRIS-T SLM missile 3.45 m (11.3 ft)
- Height: IRIS-T SLS missile 2.94 m (9.6 ft); IRIS-T SLM missile 3.45 m (11.3 ft)
- Diameter: IRIS-T SLS missile 127 mm (5.0 in); IRIS-T SLM missile 152 mm (6.0 in)
- Wingspan: IRIS-T SLS missile 447 mm (17.6 in)
- Warhead: Dual-layer HE/fragmentation
- Warhead weight: 11.4 kg (25 lb)
- Detonation mechanism: Impact and active radar proximity fuse
- Engine: Solid-fuel rocket with thrust vectoring control
- Propellant: HTPB
- Operational range: SLS: 12 km (7.5 mi); SLM: 40 km (25 mi); SLX: 80 km (50 mi)
- Flight ceiling: IRIS-T SLS 8,000 m (26,000 ft); IRIS-T SLM 20,000 m (66,000 ft); IRIS-T SLX 30,000 m (98,000 ft)
- Maximum speed: IRIS-T SLS missile 680 m/s (2,200 ft/s); IRIS-T SLM missile 1,000 m/s (3,300 ft/s)
- Guidance system: Imaging infrared seeker SLX: combined radar and infrared guidance
- Steering system: 4 exhaust vanes and 4 tail wings

The IRIS-T SL (Infra Red Imaging System Tail/Thrust Vector Controlled Surface Launched) is a family of short and high to medium air defense surface-to-air missile systems. The missile systems are developed from the IRIS-T air-to-air missile. Two variants and their derivatives are at the moment in service. Those two variants are IRIS-T SLS and the IRIS-T SLM, respectively Surface Launched Short range and Surface Launched Medium range.

The IRIS-T SLS, known locally as the Robotsystem 98 (RBS 98) entered service in 2020 after a trial period. The IRIS-T SLM entered service in 2022 with Ukraine, and later with Egypt.

The IRIS-T air defence system is designed to defend an area from aircraft (including jet fighters), helicopters, cruise missiles, drones, all of which can be stealthy.

== Design of the Missiles ==
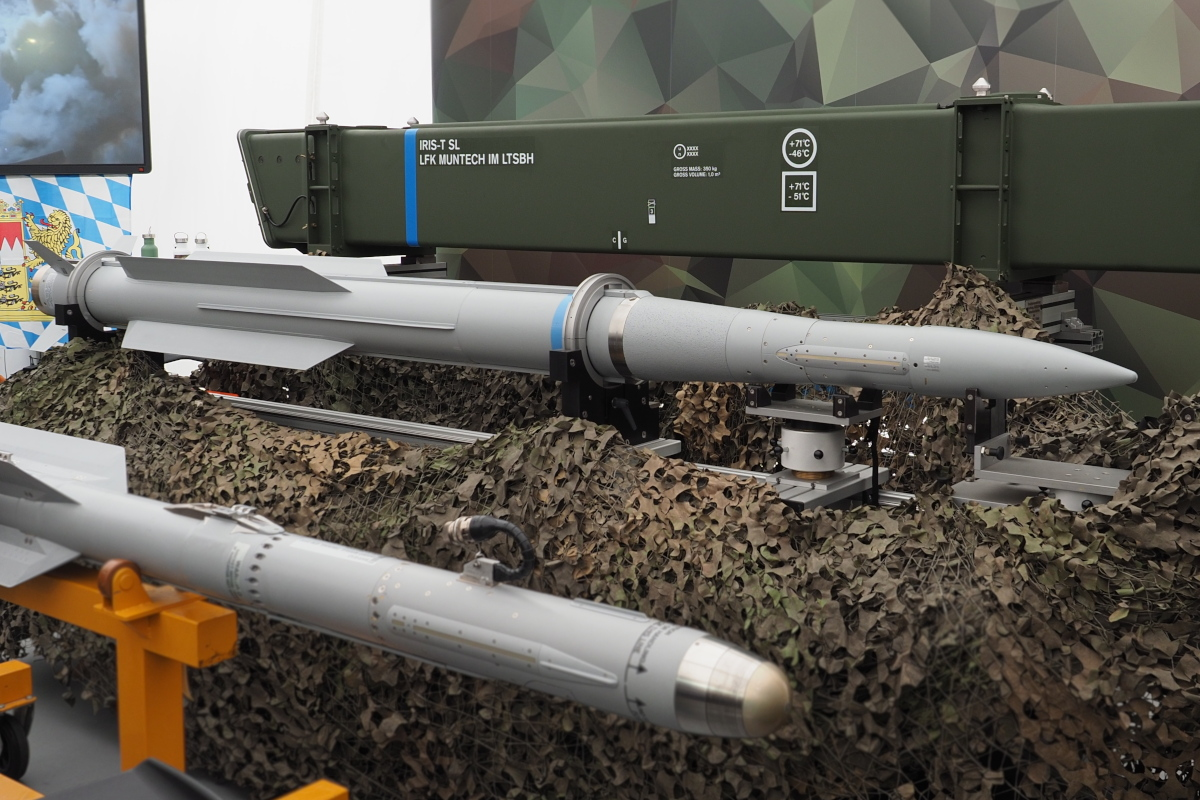
IRIS-T SLM missile (top), IRIS-T SLS (bottom)

=== IRIS-T SLS ===
The IRIS-T SLS is the same missile as the air-to-air variant.

=== IRIS-T SLM ===
NAMMO Raufoss supplies the rocket engine with its TVC (thrust vector control) for both the IRIS-T air-to-air missile and the SL variants.

== Design of the fire units variants ==
The design of the variants depend on the user. As a general principle, a fire unit is composed of a command vehicle equipped with a target designation radar. This command vehicle communicates with one or several launch vehicles. A fire unit can be incorporated into a common air-defence command system.

=== IRIS-T SLS ===
==== Robotsystem 98 (RBS 98) ====
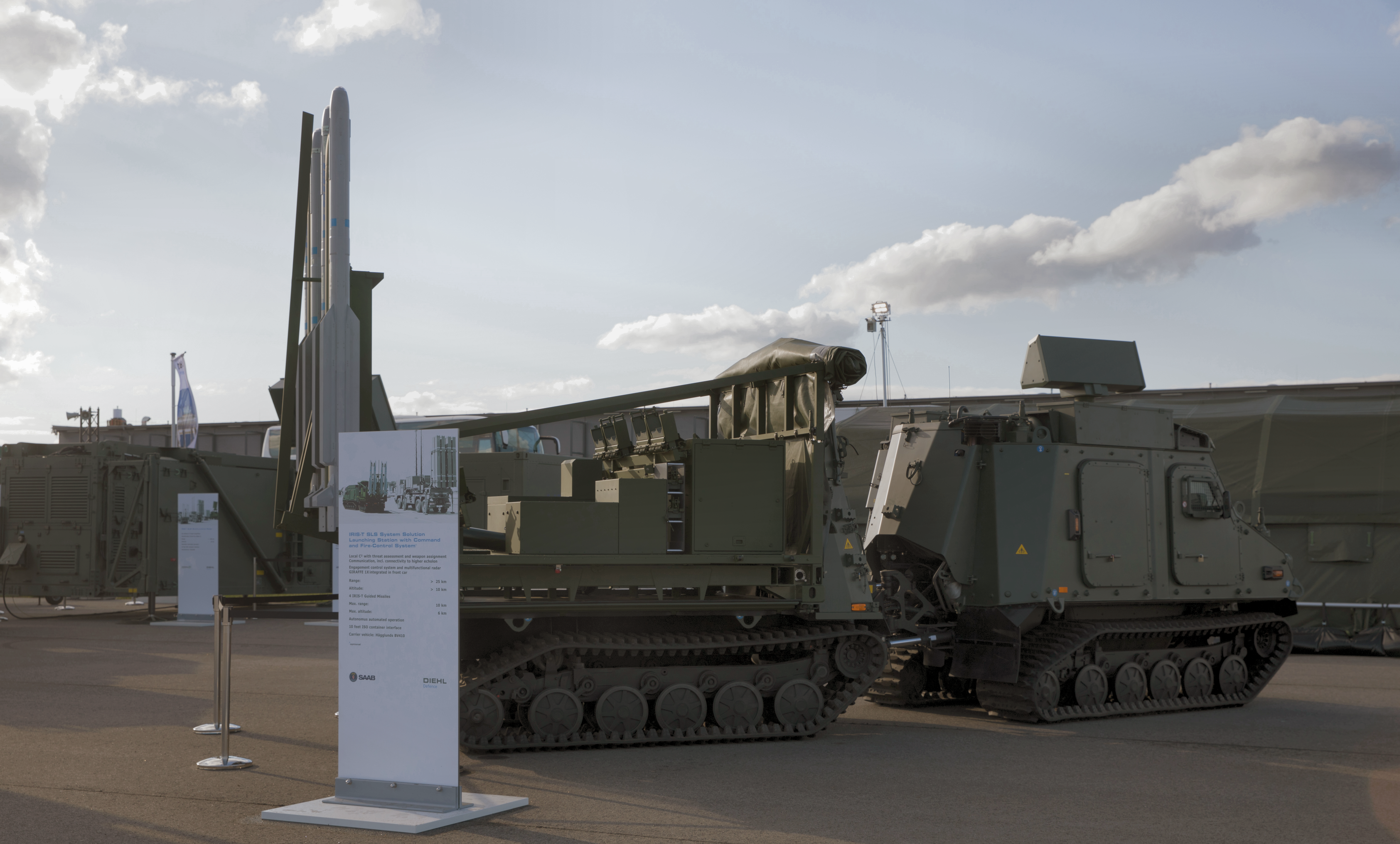
A Bv 410 with Giraffe 1X radar and Diehl ML-98 IRIS-T SLS launcher on ILA 2018

IRIS-T SLS (Surface Launched Standard) is the air defence system which uses the IRIS-T AAM with few software modifications. However, its operational range is reduced from 25 km to 12 km, as has the ceiling from 8 to 6 km. It has a maximum speed of Mach 2 and average speed of 400 m/s, and it cannot attack targets that are closer than 1 km. The IRIS-T SLS has lock-on after launch capability which enable it to launch missiles without actually locking on any target. Once the missile receives the target's data in the form of three-dimensional coordinates, it will employ inertial guidance mode during the initial phase of flight. After attaining the required engagement altitude, the seeker activates and begins scanning the expected target zone. If the radar is unavailable, there is a portable target designator that is equipped with an IR camera and an integrated laser rangefinder. The crew can use it as an alternative to transmit target information to the missile.

In 2018, Diehl Defence demonstrated a Bv 410-based IRIS-T SLS system integrated with a Saab Giraffe 1X radar during the ILA. In 2019, the Swedish Army fielded a ground launched version of the IRIS-T SLS, designated Luftvärnsrobotsystem 98 (lvrbs 98), to replace the RBS 70 missile system. Four missiles are carried on Eldenhet 98 (elde 98) launcher, a special version of a Bv 410 tracked, armoured vehicle. Compared to the one demonstrated on the ILA 2018, there was no radar on the Swedish Eldenhet 98. Instead, the Swedish Army used the Underrättelseenhet 23 (UndE 23) radar truck as its radar unit.

==== NOMADS ====
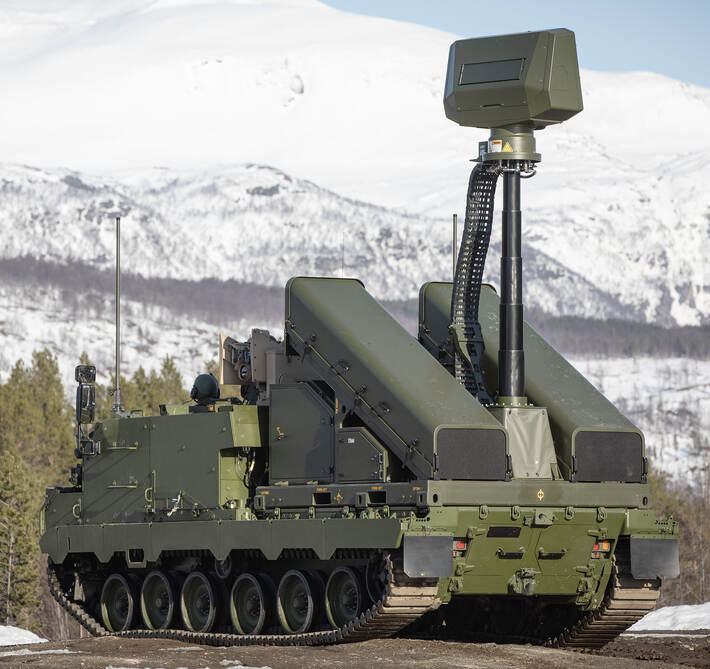
NOMADS mobile air-defence system that can launch IRIS-T AAM

The Norwegian Army ordered the "mobile ground based air defence system", based on NASAMS command and control solutions, in a direct acquisition with Kongsberg Defence & Aerospace. The system will integrate tracked IRIS-T SLS launchers from Diehl Defence GmbH with High Mobility Launchers for AIM-120 and AIM-9X missiles and XENTA-M radars from Weibel Scientific; initial delivery is planned for 2023 and will include six modified M113 vehicles carrying IRIS-T SLS missiles, while additional launchers will be based on the ACSV.

==== IRIS-T SLS Mk. III ====
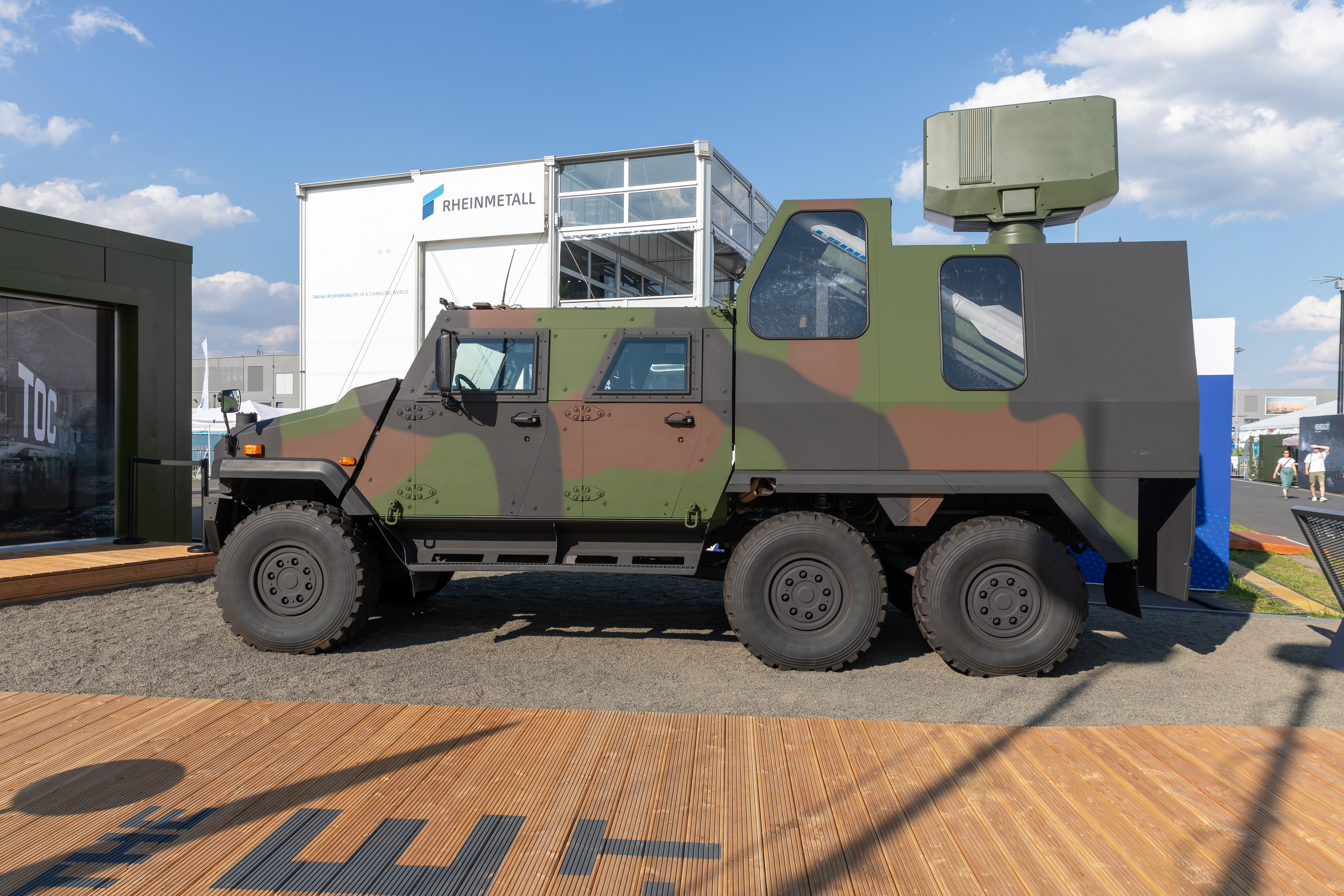
IRIS-T SLS Mk. III at ILA 2024

In 2022, Diehl Defence showed a new air defence system called IRIS-T SLS Mk. III at the Eurosatory. It was a modified Mowag Eagle 6×6 armoured vehicle integrated with IRIS-T SLS launcher, Hensoldt Spexer 2000 3D AESA or a Xenta-M, and it can be equipped with a .50 machine gun in the remote controlled weapon station. Its STANAG 4569 protection was level 1, and it could be upgraded to level 3 by adding armor kit. This vehicle had integrated the missile launcher, the radar, the sensors and the C^{2} command system, making it able to operate independently as an air defence system.

==== IRIS-T SLS Mk. IV ====
At ILA 2026, Diehl presented a Mercedes Zetros mounted IRIS-T SLS launcher equipped with its own radar. The system is capable of launching 8 missiles.The radar is a Saab Giraffe 1X. The system is equipped with 15 Diehl Cicada self-defence drones. It is capable of firing on the move.

==== IRIS-T SLS fire unit ====
In February 2025, it was revealed that a Ukrainian IRIS-T SLS air defence system consisted of two Italian Iveco 4×4 trucks that integrated with SLS missile launcher. The system is also integrated with the TRML-4D radar, which guides the missiles to the target.

=== IRIS-T SLM ===
IRIS-T SLM (Surface Launched Missile) is the air defence system which uses the IRIS-T SL missile. As a part of the NATO MEADS program, the German Air Force and others are now using this missile. It has a pointed nose, unlike the regular IRIS-T, with a jettisonable drag-reducing nose cone. The missile uses a GPS-aided inertial navigation system, with radio data link for command guidance during the initial approach. The interference-resistant IR seeker head is activated at the terminal stage.

Compared to the IRIS-T, the diameter of the rocket motor was increased by 25 mm, to 152 mm. Test launches from a fire unit consisting of a CEA CEAFAR radar, a Diehl IRIS-T SL launcher and an Oerlikon Skymaster battle management system were performed in 2014. The IRIS-T SL qualification tests were completed in January 2015 at the Denel Overberg Test Range in South Africa. A further fire test on the developed system of the IRIS-T SLM was completed in January 2022.

An IRIS-T SLM air defence system consists of a tactical operation center, a logistic support unit, several radar units, and 3 or 4 missile trucks. The IRIS-T SLM can be integrated with a variety of electro-optical/infrared (EO/IR) guidance systems and AESA radars, such as Hensoldt TRML-4D, Thales Ground Master 200 MM/C, CEA CEAFAR, and Saab Giraffe 4A. A version with a Lockheed-Martin Skykeeper command and control station, Giraffe 4A radar and Diehl IRIS-T SLM launcher was shown at IDEX 2019 under the name Falcon Ground Based Air Defence.

Egypt ordered Diehl IRIS-T SLM launchers, Hensoldt TRML-4D radars, and fire and control stations equipped with Airbus Defence Fortion IBMS integrated battle management software, all mounted on MAN 8×8 military trucks; the deal was approved by the German government in December 2021. Further orders includes Hensoldt TwInvis passive radars, IRIS-T SLS launchers and IRIS-T SLX long-range missiles. Passive radars can detect enemy aircraft by analysing reflections from external radio and television signals, making them effective in urban areas where active radars struggle.

The German Air Force has received its first IRIS-T SLM system in 2024 and is to receive five more by 2027. Also, mixed SLS/SLM systems are being planned.

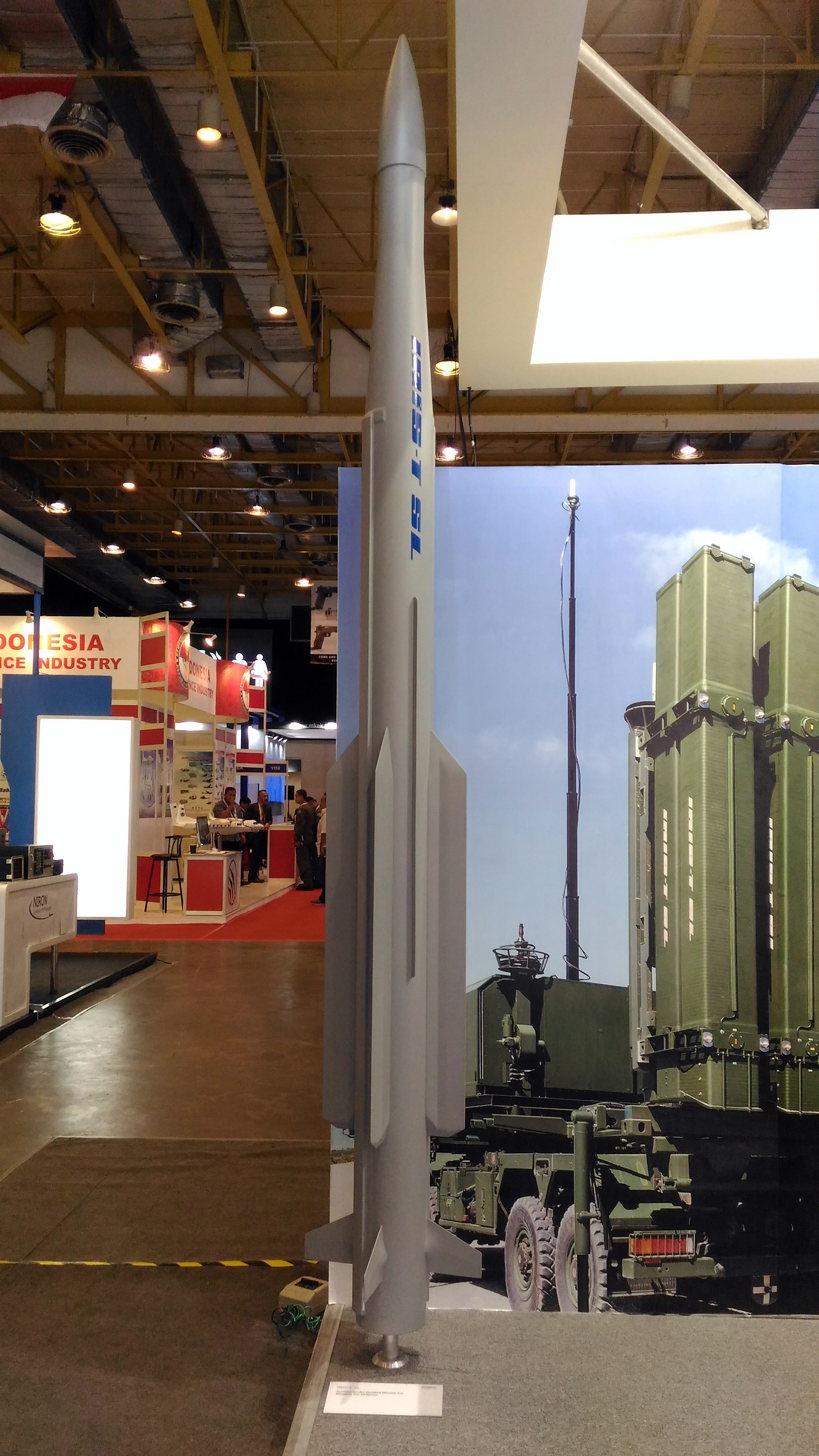
An IRIS-T SLM missile

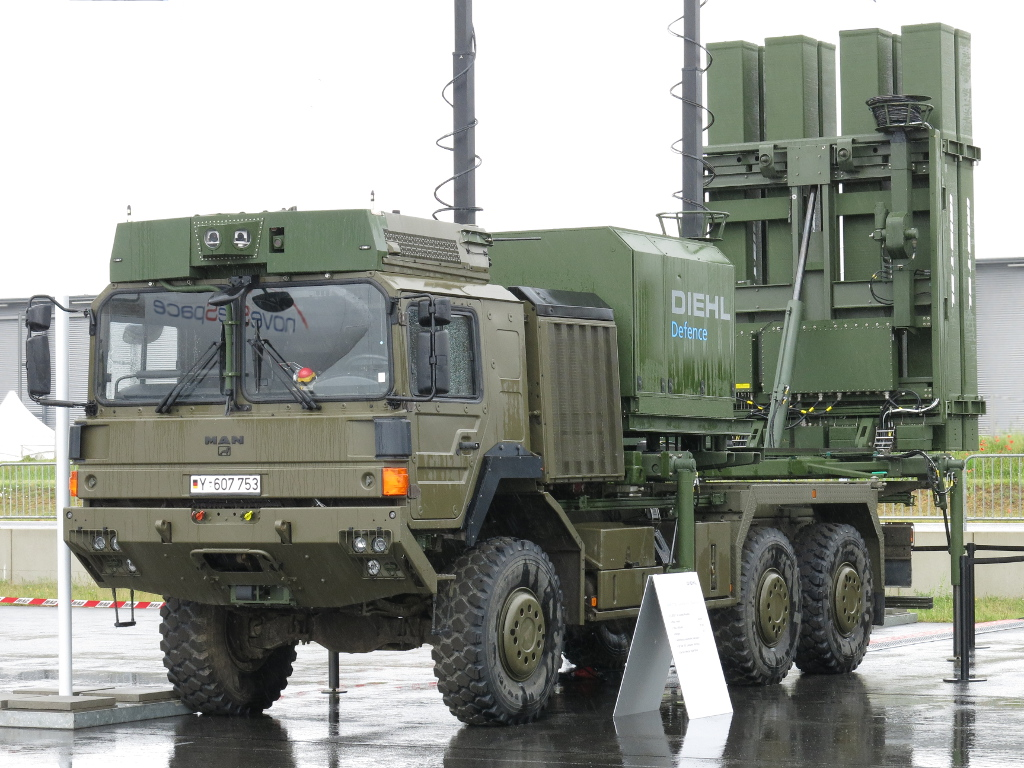
A MAN SX44 6x6 7-ton IRIS-T SL launcher

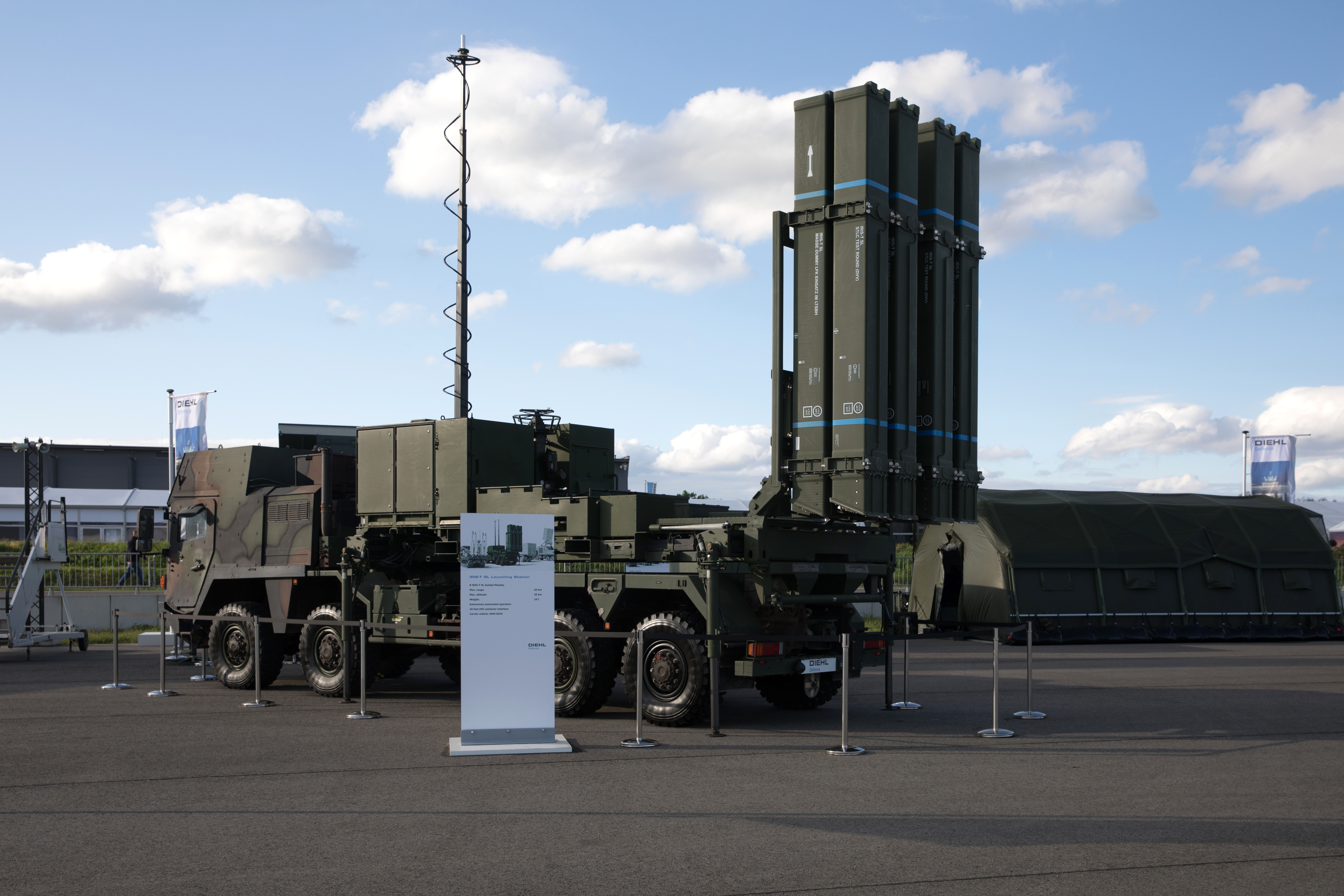
A MAN SX45 8x8 10-ton IRIS-T SLM launcher

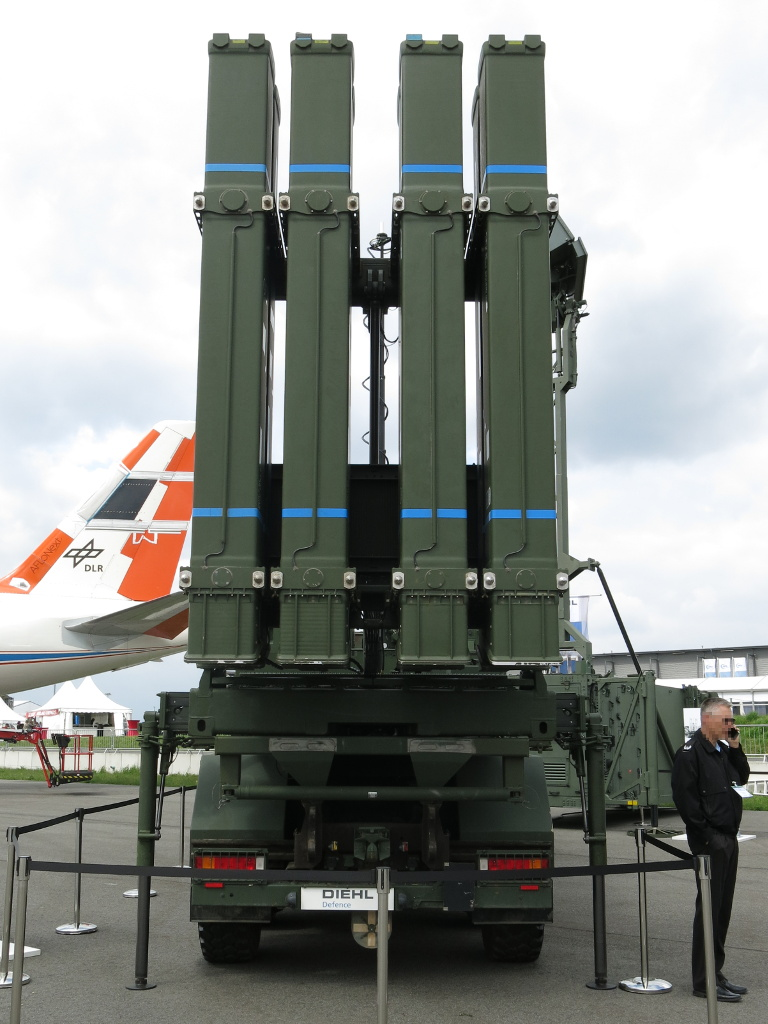
A MAN SX45 8x8 10-ton IRIS-T SLM launcher rear

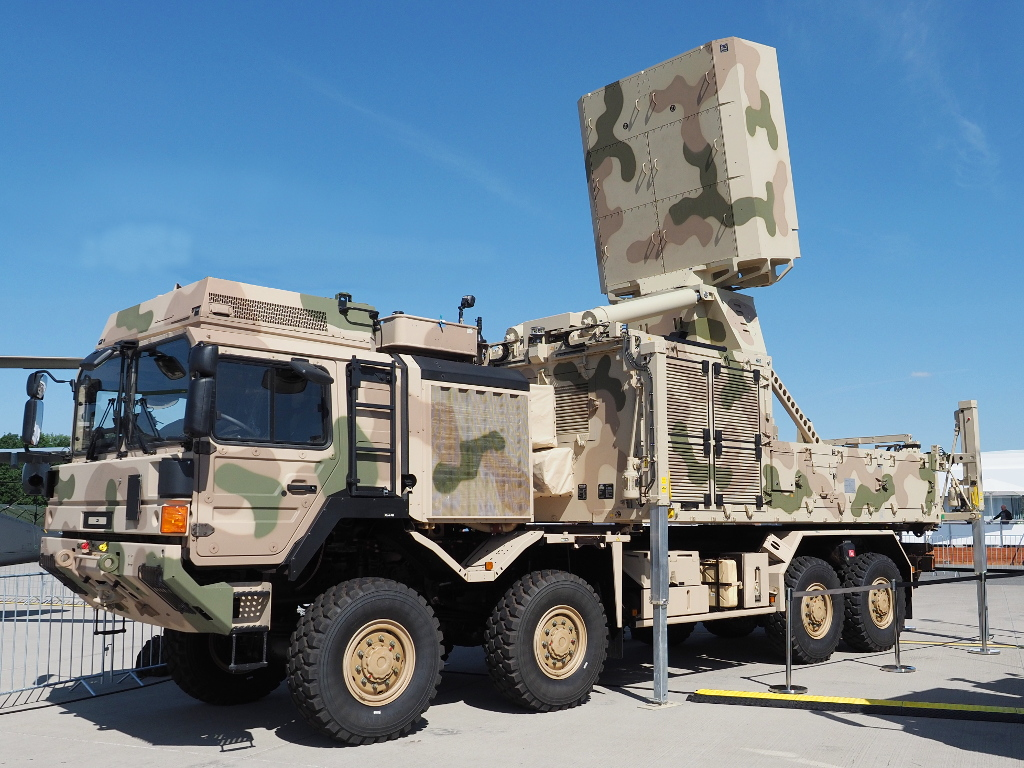
A Hensoldt TRML-4D radar

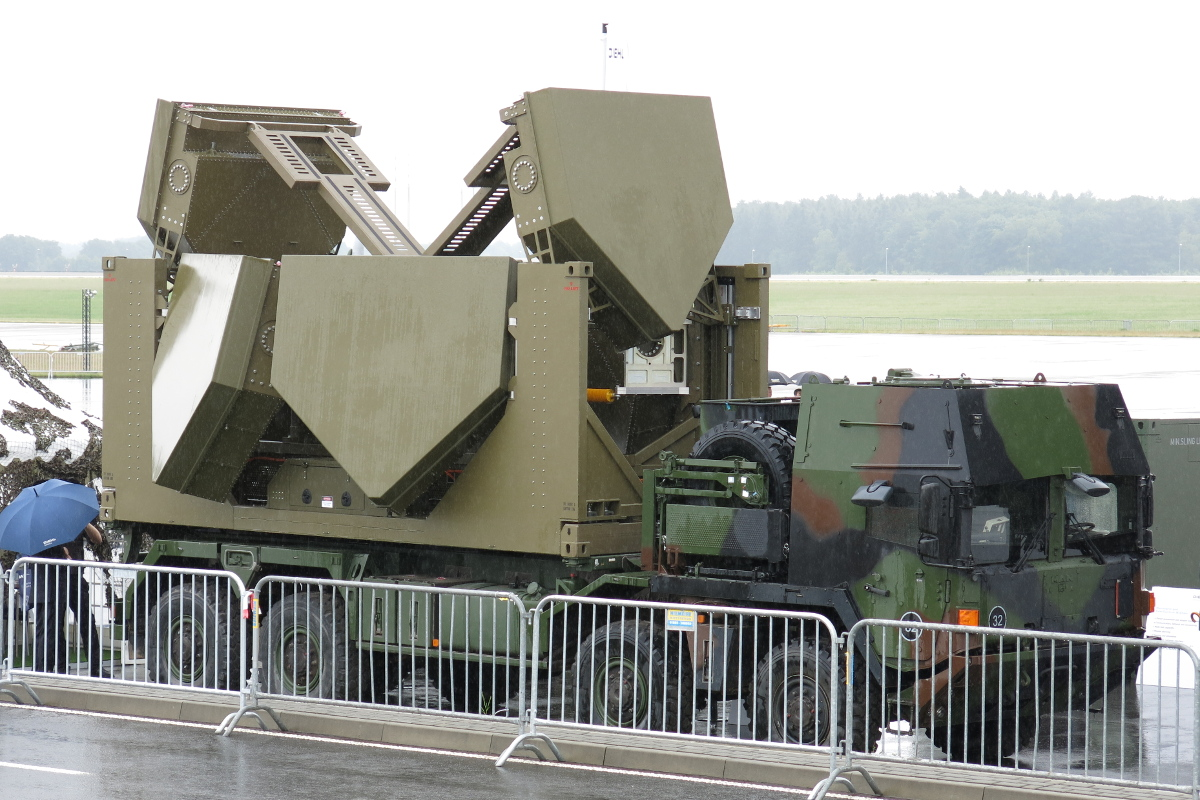
A CEA CEAFAR (GBMMR) radar

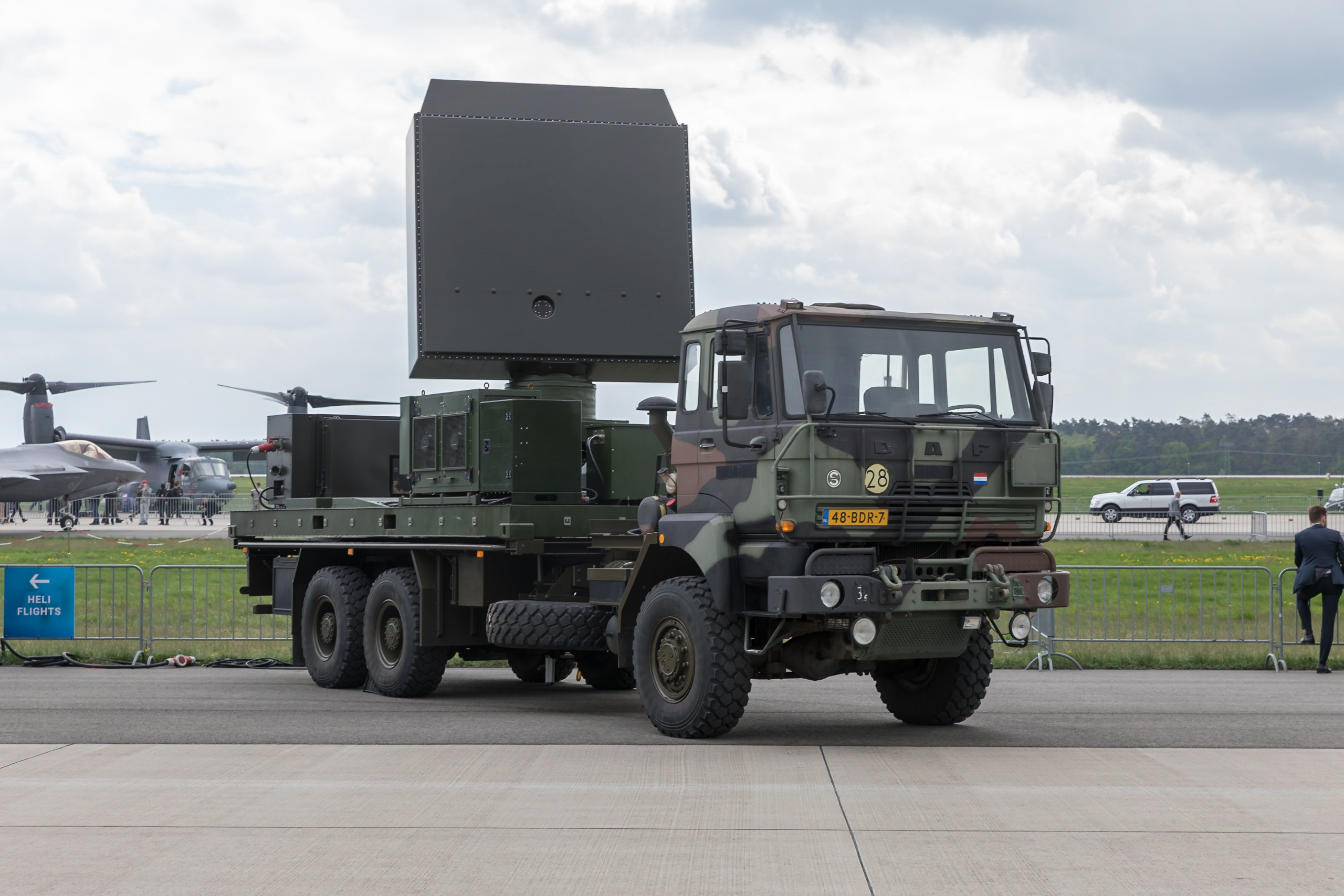
The Thales Ground Master 200 MM/C radar

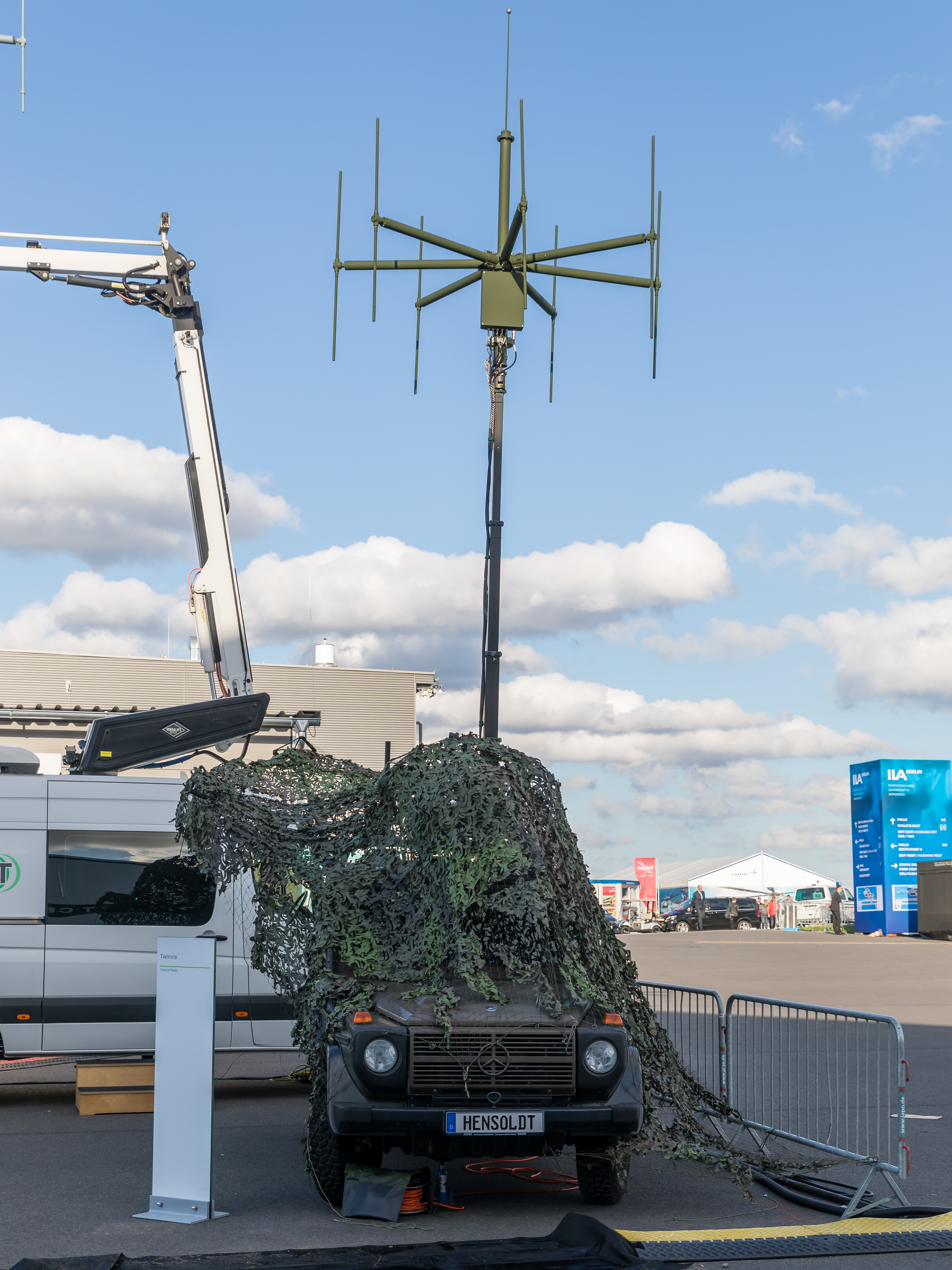
A Hensoldt TwInvis passive radar

=== Variants in development ===
==== IRIS-T SLX ====
IRIS-T SLX is an upgraded variant of IRIS-T surface-to-air missile which has the operational range of 80 km and ceiling of 30 km. It will also use a combined radar and infrared seeker and remote guidance for initial approach. On the ILA 2024, Diehl Defence displayed a missile model of the developing IRIS-T SLX, which looked quite different to both IRIS-T AAM and IRIS-T SL with a wider rocket motor but shorter overall length and smaller fins. This new missile can be integrated into the IRIS-T SLM launchers, which can be loaded with a mix of SL and SLX missiles as the result. Only 50 to 60 soldiers are needed for each system. The Diehl Defence chief programme officer Harald Buschek said this variant was capable of countering standoff weapons, and it was likely to be ready for operation within around 4 years. It also would retain the ability to engage cruise missiles and helicopters.

==== Naval surface-to-air missile ====
Diehl mentioned that the IRIS-T SLM missile was being integrated to the Mark 41 vertical launching system.

The German procurement agency BAAINBw signed a contract with Diehl for a feasibility study to integrate the IRIS-T SLM to the Baden-Württemberg class (F125) in December 2024. This contract includes a risk analysis, and the production of a system demonstrator. During the Maritime Firing Exercise 2025 (MFE 2025) the navalised system demonstrator of the IRIS-T SLM ground-based air defence system was successfully tested aboard the German frigate Baden-Württemberg.

In November 2025, Lockheed Martin and Diehl signed a contract to integrate the IRIS-T SLM to the Mk41 VLS, and to the AEGIS combat system (CMS 330).

In June 2026, it was announced by Diehl that two dedicated launchers with 16 missiles each would be installed on the four frigates of the Baden-Württemberg class (Type F125). Diehl explained that deflector plates would be installed on the ship's deck to protect it from heat damage from hot launches. And the launch canisters will be in a permanent vertical position in the launcher.

The budget for the integration of the IRIS-T SLM was approved in September 2026, and a contract for the development of the prototype and a testing phase was signed in October 2026.

==== Integration of alternative radars ====
In October 2025, Hanwha and Diehl signed a memorandum of understanding to integrate the Hanwha Multi-Function Radar family of radars with the intent to explore new markets.

== Operators ==
=== Current operators ===
Operators of the IRIS-T SLM variant, as of July 2025 Current Future

Egypt (23 fire units ordered in total)
Using the Airbus Fortion IBMS-FC, a Hensoldt TRML-4D radar installed on a MAN HX2.
- 7 IRIS-T SLM ground-based air defence systems ordered in 2018. with a further order of 400 SLM missiles
- 10 IRIS-T SLX systems was approved in December 2021
- 6 IRIS-T SLS systems
Estonia (1 SLM fire unit delivered, 2 on order)
In May 2023, the Latvian and Estonian governments announced their decision to jointly procure the IRIS-T SLM systems, with deliveries expected in 2025. 3 IRIS-T SLM systems were ordered. The first system arrived in June 2026.
Sweden (2 fire units)
IRIS-T SLS known as Luftvärnsrobotsystem 98 or lvrbs 98. It was ordered in 2013, first system used for trial was delivered in 2016. The system is made of:
- BvS 10 vehicle with a command post.
- BvS 10 the trailer of the vehicle on which four IRIS-T SLS missiles are installed.
450 IRIS-T missiles, designated IRIS-T SLS variant used in ground-based air defence systems.
Ukraine (7 in service, 11 more on order)
Germany provided military aid packages to Ukraine facing the Russian invasion.
- 12 IRIS-T SLM systems, among which, 6 delivered (1 in October 2022, 1 in April 2023, 1 in October 2023, 1 in May 2024, 1 in December 2024), and additional IRIS-T SLM missiles are being supplied by Germany.
- 12 IRIS-T SLS systems, with three delivered. One IRIS-T SLS system likely consists of two launchers. The IRIS-T SLM batteries are all equipped with the fire control system Airbus Fortion IBMS-FC and the radar TRML-4D from Hensoldt. Those systems use the MAN HX2 platform. In comparison, each Ukrainian IRIS-T SLS system consists of 2 missile launchers. These launchers are integrated with Iveco 4×4 trucks. They need the Hensoldt TRML-4D mobile radar to guide the missiles.
- In May 2025, Germany placed an order for 6 IRIS-T SLS/SLM fire units, worth €2.2 billion. The framework agreement enables to provide up to 10 fire units, and 500 missiles, but depending on the Ukrainian needs, the munitions or the fire units might be prioritized.
Norway announced in July 2024 that $92 million will be allocated for an IRIS-T SLM battery to be delivered to Ukraine.
Germany (SLM: 2 fire units operational, 4 on order, 2 on option, 216 missiles ordered)
IRIS-T SLM
The German Air Force operates 1 IRIS-T SLM fire unit. The system gained its initial operational capability in September 2024 after having been handed over to the German procurement agency in August 2024.
In June 2023, the German Air Force ordered 6 fire units with 216 missiles for €950 million, and there is an option for 2 additional fire units. The order is financed from the Bundeswehr special fund. This system is also part of the European Sky Shield Initiative.
Composition of a IRIS-T SLM fire unit in the German Armed Forces:
- 1 Hensoldt TRML-4D radar
- 1 IBMS-FC (Integrated Battle Management Software Fire Control) command post
- 3 launchers with each 8 missiles (24 ready to be fired in total)
- Support vehicles (repairs and missile transport and reload systems)

=== Future operators and planned orders ===
Austria (4 SLS and 4 SLM fire units planned)
8 IRIS-T fire units with 3 launchers each are to be purchased by Austria. It will include IRIS-T SLM and SLS batteries. The decision for this system was announced in September 2023.
Bulgaria (6 SLM fire unit)
The Bulgarian parliament approved the purchase of 1 fire unit of the IRIS-T SLM for the Bulgarian Air Force in August 2024.
A further 5 IRIS-T SLM systems were ordered as part of the European Sky Shield Initiative (ESSI) and funded through the Security Action for Europe (SAFE) program in November 2026.
Denmark (> 2 SLM fire units)
The Bundeswehr ordered 2 IRIS-T SLM in July 2025 in favour of Denmark.
An additional order was placed in December 2025 for an unknown quantity.
Germany (100 SLS independent units + SLM and SLX fire units planned)
In July 2025, the German government announced a plan to procure up to mobile 100 IRIS-T SLS, and additional IRIS-T SLM and IRIS-T SLX.
- IRIS-T SLS:
  - IRIS-T SLS systems: As part of the programme LVS NNbS, Rheinmetall (in collaboration with Diehl Defence and Hensoldt Sensors) is developing a self-propelled launcher based on the Boxer.The development contract is worth €1.2 billion. As of July 2025, the announced volume is expected to be of 100 systems.
  - IRIS-T SLS missiles: The German Army is planning to reach a reserve of 30 weapon packages per air defence system. With 6 missiles per launcher, that would mean 18,000 missiles.
- IRIS-T SLM:
  - IRIS-T SLM fire units: additional planned as of July 2025.
  - IRIS-T SLM missiles: with the rule of 30 weapon packages for each air defence system, and 3 launchers per fire unit, that would mean 720 IRIS-T SLM per fire unit and a total of 4,320 for the ones already ordered (+ 4104).
- IRIS-T SLX fire units:
  - IRIS-T SLX fire units: Planned to be ordered, the volume is unknown.
German Navy:
- IRIS-T SLM naval launchers and missiles for the four frigates of the Baden-Württemberg class (Type F125) (2 launchers with 16 missiles each per ship), prototype and testing contract signed in October 2026
Latvia (3 SLM fire units)
IRIS-T SLM system contract signed in November 2023 for €600 million, delivery of components from 2026.
Norway (36 SLS / AAM missile)
Norway is developing its short range NOMADS mobile ground-based air defence system. It is using elements of the NASAMS 3 system, and elements from the IRIS-T SLS system. The NOMADS purchase includes:
- 36 IRIS-T SLS missiles
- 6 mobile launchers PMMC G5 equipped with 6 IRIS-T SLS canister launchers and a XENTA-M X-band radar designed by Weibel Scientific
- 3 High Mobility Launcher (HML) HMMWV-based equipped with a roof rack with up to 4 AIM-120B AMRAAM or 6 AIM-120C missiles
- a command and control system based on the NASAMS 3.
Romania (3 SLM fire units)
3 IRIS-T SLM systems ordered as part of the ESSI and funded through the SAFE program.
Slovenia (3 SLM fire units)
Contract for 1 fire unit of the IRIS-T SLM system signed in December 2023 for €200 million. In early 2025, it was decided that Slovenia would order two more batteries of the IRIS T system. The first fire unit is expected to be delivered in 2027, and the second and third in 2028. Additional order for 2 fire units in August 2025.
Sweden (8 SLS fire units + 7 SLM fire units)
Orders:
- IRIS-T SLM: June 2025, 7 fire units for a value of €810 million. The delivery is planned for mid-2028 to 2030. Equipment:
  - Radar: only 2 Hensoldt TRML-4D radars for the moment.
- IRIS-T SLS: November 2025, 8 fire units ordered for a value of €320 million (€140 million for the vehicles, €180 million for the air defence systems). Equipment:
  - 16 launchers Iris-T SLS Starter
  - 8 Saab Giraffe 1X mounted on command vehicles
Switzerland (8 SLM fire units)
Swiss Air Force – Tender for Bodluv MR Programme launched in April 2024. Armasuisse requested an offer to Diehl for a medium range air defence system (a variant of the IRIS-T SL). Diehl is in competition against MBDA (with potentially the CAMM, CAMM-ER or MICA-VL) and Kongsberg / Raytheon (with the NASAMS or MGBAD).
As of July 2024, Kongsberg / Raytheon and MBDA made the decision to not submit an offer for the Bodluv MR Programme.
In April 2025, trials of the TRML-4D radar of the IRIS-T SLM system took place. And it was mentioned that negotiations for the systems were ongoing for 4 to 5 fire units.
In early July 2025, Armasuisse signed an agreement with the German National Armaments Director for the procurement of 5 fire units. The contract with Diehl is expected to be signed in summer 2025. The budget for that purchase was part of the Armament Programme 2025 with up to CHF 660 million.
Additional fire units, missiles, spare parts, training capacity for the IRIS-T SLM will be ordered under the Armament Programme 2026.

=== Potential sales ===
Denmark (up to 11 fire units)
Denmark intends to purchase more fire units, with a total of up to 11 IRIS-T SLM.
Lithuania
On 21 May 2024, in the meeting with Germany Federal Ministry of Defence Boris Pistorius, the Ministry of National Defence Laurynas Kasčiūnas said that Lithuania was considering purchasing IRIS-T medium-range air defence system.
Spain
The IRIS-T SLM is considered as a candidate to replace the MiM-23 Hawk air defence system.
Switzerland
As of early 2026, additional purchases are being considered:
- Delays with the Patriot deliveries might push Switzerland to buy IRIS-T SLX systems. It will likely be in competition with the SAMP/T NG, or it might be bought in combination. Switzerland ordered the PAC-2 MSE missiles and the PAC-3 GEM-T, and the IRIS-T SLX would be a direct replacement for the PAC-3 GEM-T while the PAC-2 MSE would be replaced by the Aster 30 NG missile.
ESSI members (European Sky Shield Initiative)
As part of the ESSI (European Sky Shield Initiative), a common European air defence system which will be made of mostly IRIS-T SL and the MIM-104 Patriot System. The ESSI initiative includes some countries that are already clients (Germany, Latvia, Estonia, Norway), or soon to be clients (Belgium, Bulgaria, Czech Republic, Finland, Hungary, Lithuania, Romania, Slovakia, Slovenia, Denmark).

=== Failed bids ===
Romania
€3.85 billion was allocated for 41 launchers, to be purchased in 2 phases as part of the SHORAD/VSHORAD program. It was in competition against the NASAMS from Kongsberg, the VL Mica from MBDA France, the SPYDER from Rafael and the KM-SAM from Hanwha. SPYDER was selected as the winner of the program in July 2025.

== Operational usage ==
=== Egypt ===
The first IRIS-T SLM system was delivered in 2021 to Egypt, and trials followed, seeing the successful downing of two drones.

=== Germany ===
In September 2024, The German Air Force activated its first IRIS-T SLM fire unit.

=== Ukraine ===
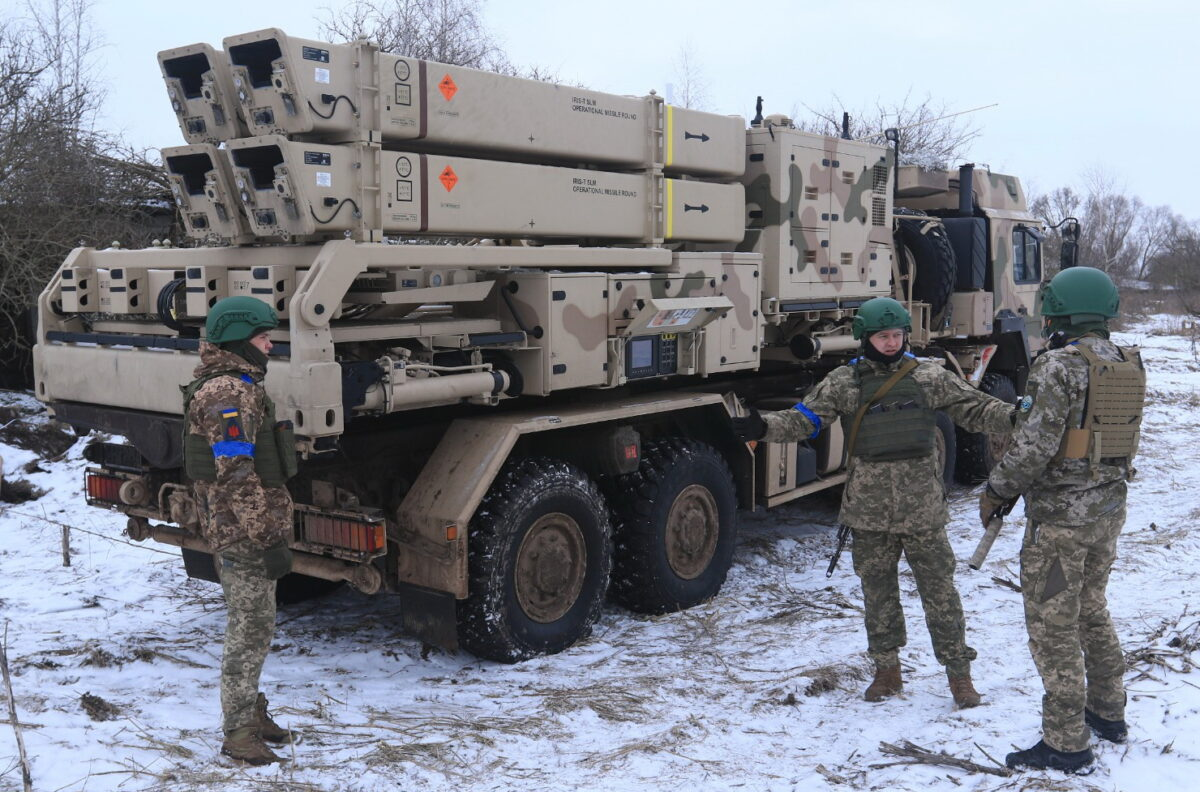
Ukrainian IRIS-T SLM launcher

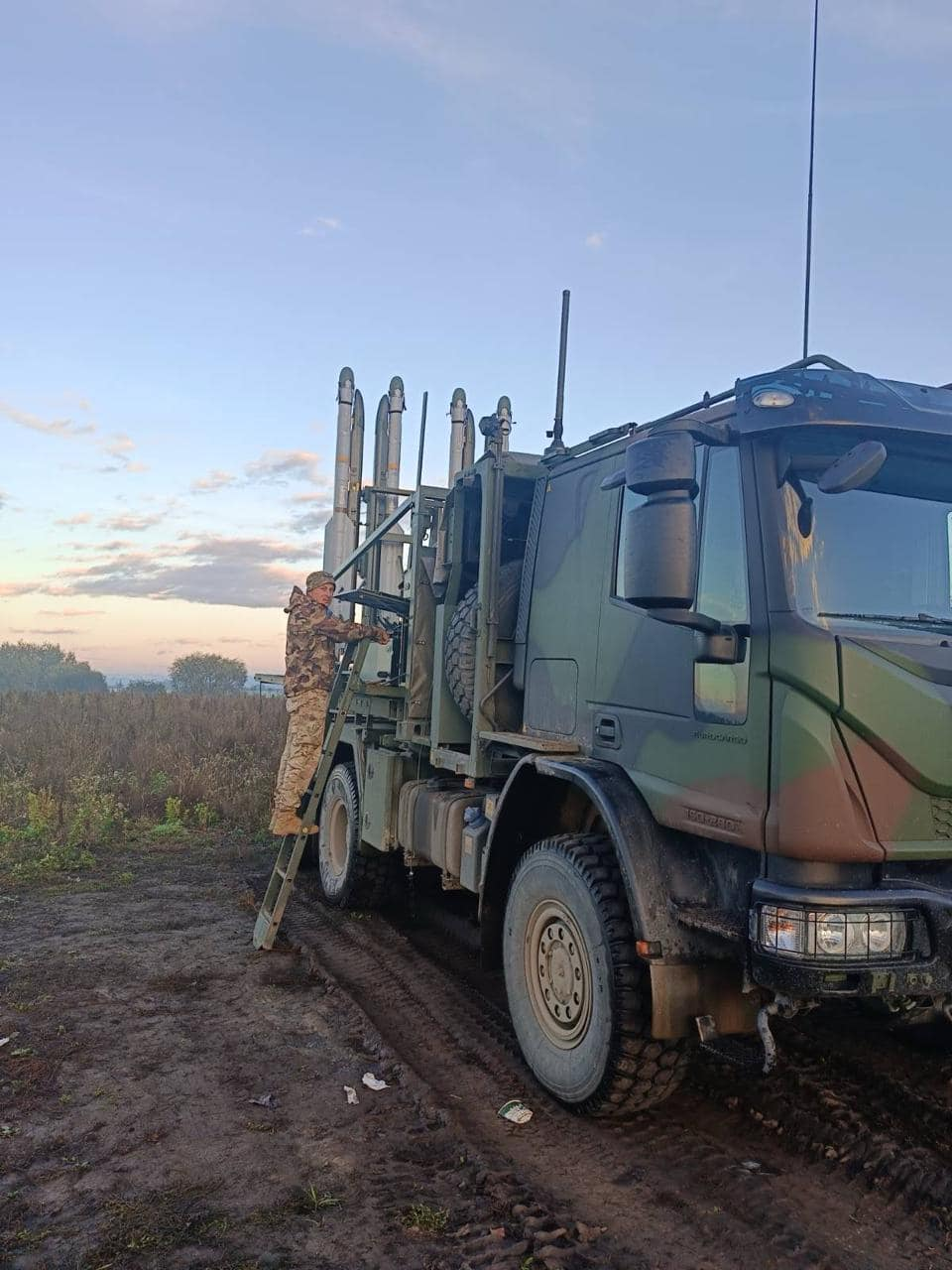
Ukrainian IRIS-T SLS launcher

On 24 October 2022, at the opening of the 5th Business Forum on the Reconstruction of Ukraine, the Prime Minister of Ukraine Denys Shmyhal noted that German IRIS-T system had the highest successful hit rate among others in the Armed Forces of Ukraine, and it could destroy 9 out of 10 Russian missiles.

Following another Russian missile attack against Ukraine on 31 October 2022, the Ukrainian Air Force stated that IRIS-T missiles had a 100% success rate countering the attack.

On 15 November 2022 footage appearing to show the IRIS-T system shooting down two cruise missiles circulated. One missile appeared to be a Kalibr cruise missile.

During the 2023 Ukrainian counteroffensive, a TRML-4D multi-functional radar from the IRIS-T SLM air defence system was reportedly damaged by a Russian ZALA Lancet drone, with the extent of damage unclear. According to Ukraine, the system remained functional.

As of October 2023 Germany had transferred to Ukraine three IRIS-T air defence systems.

On 23 November 2023, the German Federal Ministry of Defence announced that an additional four IRIS-T SLM medium-range air defence systems would be supplied to Ukraine as part of a military aid package worth more than €1.3 billion (US$1.4 billion). The systems will be supplied from 2025. .

By June 2024, Helmut Rauch, the CEO of Diehl Defence claimed that 240 kills were achieved by the IRIS-T SLM and SLS in Ukraine with an almost 100% success rate.

During an undated engagement a fire unit commander reported an IRIS-T destroying 8 cruise missiles with 8 interceptors within 30 seconds, while protecting critical infrastructure: "We destroyed all targets within 30 seconds. The Russian cruise missiles entered the engagement zone literally one after another, and we immediately locked onto them as targets and fired upon them. For each target, we used one of our guided anti-aircraft missiles. We operated with 100 percent accuracy. The IRIS-T system can simultaneously engage many targets. And this allows successfully repelling massive enemy missile strikes," Having previously operated the Buk-M1 he said that the IRIS-T “exceeded all our expectations.”

== See also ==
- Hisar
- MBDA MICA VL
- MBDA CAMM missiles
- Surface-to-air systems using variants of the CAMM missile:
  - Italian Army: Grifo, with the CAMM-ER missile
  - Italian Air Force: MAADS (Medium Advanced Air Defence System) with the CAMM-ER missile
  - British Army: Sky Sabre, with the CAMM missile
  - Polish Air Force: Mała Narew and Pilica+, with the CAMM missile
  - Polish Air Force: Narew, with the CAMM-ER missile
- NASAMS
- NOMADS

== Sources ==
- Andersson, Martin (2012). Möjliga efterträdare till robotsystem 70 (PhD thesis) (in Swedish). Military Academy Karlberg.
- Friedman, Norman (1997). The Naval Institute Guide to World Naval Weapons Systems, 1997–1998. US Naval Inst. Pr. pp. 422–423. ISBN 9781557502681.
