= PMMC G5 =

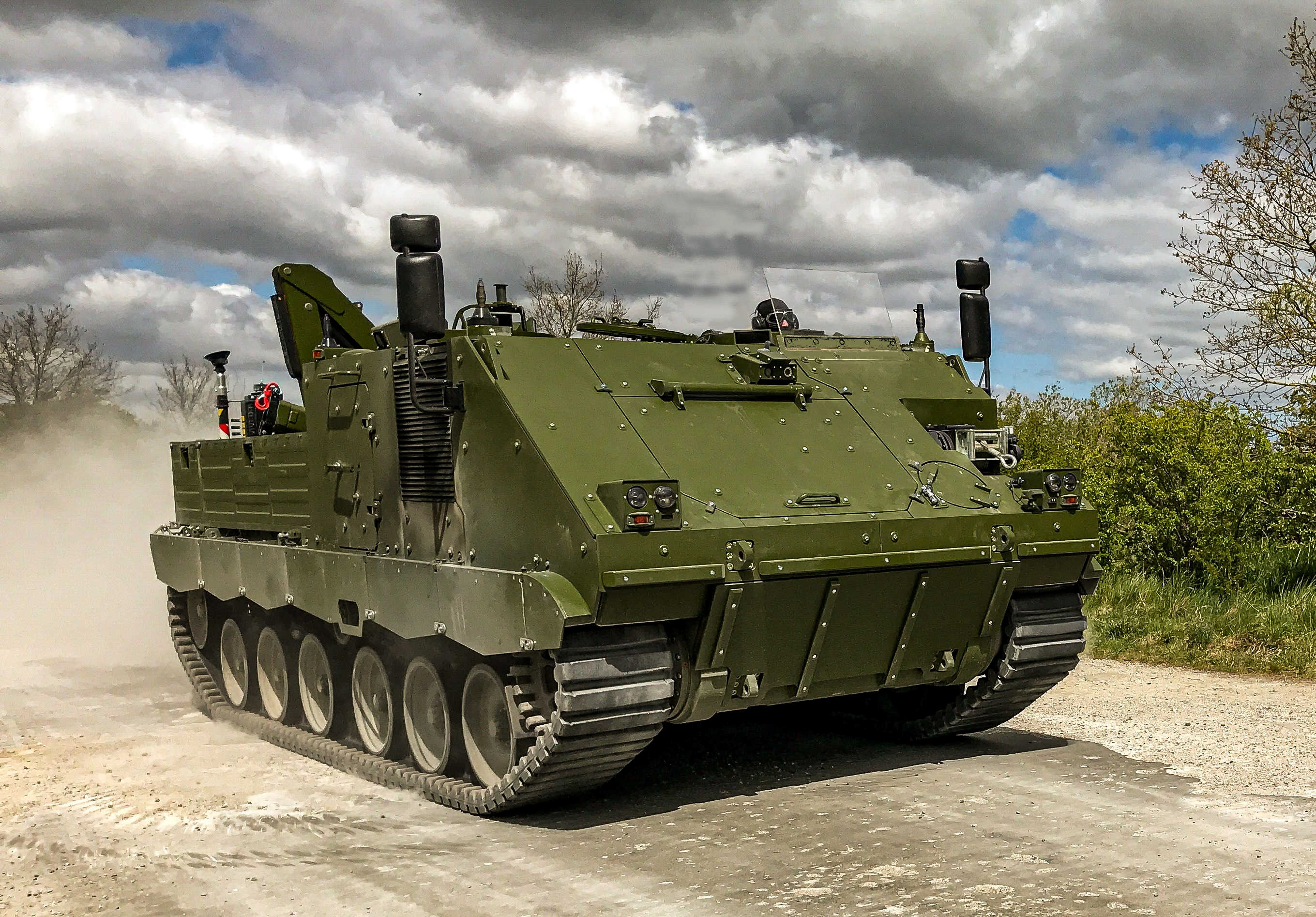
- PMMC G5 Armoured Combat Support Vehicle (ACSV)
- Type: light tracked vehicle
- Place of origin: Germany

Service history
- Used by: See Current Operators

Production history
- Designer: FFG
- Designed: 2012
- Manufacturer: FFG
- Produced: 2021-present
- Variants: see Variants

Specifications
- Mass: Curb weight: 18 t (40,000 lb); Gross weight: 26 t (57,000 lb)
- Length: 6,928 mm (22 ft 8.8 in)
- Width: 2,996 mm (9 ft 10.0 in)
- Height: 3,050 mm (10 ft 0 in)
- Crew: 2 to 5 (depending on variant)
- Passengers: Up to 12
- Engine: MTU 6V199 TE21; V6 turbocharged diesel engine 460 kW (620 hp)
- Power/weight: 17.69 kW/t (23.72 hp/t)
- Payload capacity: 8 t (18,000 lb)
- Drive: Tracked (rubber tracks)
- Transmission: ZF LSG 1000 HD automatic transmission (6 forward 2 reverse gears)
- Suspension: torsion bar
- Operational range: 600 km (370 mi)
- Maximum speed: 74 km/h (46 mph) on road
- Steering system: Hydrostatic

The PMMC (Protected Mission Module Carrier) G5 is a family of light tracked vehicles designed and manufactured by Flensburger Fahrzeugbau GmbH (FFG) of Germany. Although it is similar in appearance and design to the American M113, and the company manufactures modernised versions of that vehicle, the PMMC G5 is an all-new ground-up design.

As of 2022, it has only been selected for use by the Norwegian Army and is now described by FFG as a "technology demonstrator".

== Overview ==
=== Background ===
Commencing in 2012, the vehicle was developed in a private venture as an alternative to modernised M113-based vehicles, and to compete in global markets against modern tracked and wheeled vehicles in a similar weight range (e.g. Boxer, CV90, etc.). It is built around a modular design allowing the basic platform to be easily configured into the variant which best suits the mission requirements i.e. armoured personnel carrier, command and control vehicle, infantry fighting vehicle, etc.

A prototype of the vehicle was first displayed at the Eurosatory International Defence Show in Paris, France, in 2014. The vehicle underwent extensive testing in a variety of different operating conditions, including summer testing in sand in Abu Dhabi and winter testing in snow in Norway. Limited production commenced in 2018 with full-scale production commencing in early 2021.

=== Design objectives ===
The vehicle was designed to fulfil the following objectives:

- 360-degree situation awareness
- Air, rail, road and sea transportable
- Class-leading off-road performance in mud, sand and snow
- Enhanced crew and troop comfort
- High level integrated mine and IED protection with further armour upgrades available
- Improved reliability through utilisation of proven components
- Integrated communications and battlefield management systems
- Maximum crew and troop survivability
- Reduced maintenance costs through utilisation of common components across variants and other vehicles
- Reduced unit costs through utilisation of COTS technologies
- Reduced total life-cycle cost
- Single-unit power pack removal

=== Operating environment ===
The vehicle has been designed for operations in the following environments:

- Operating temperature range: −40 to 49 °C (−40 to 120 °F)
- Climbing gradient: 60 degrees
- Lateral inclination: 30 degrees

The vehicle is not amphibious but can ford waterways to a depth of 1.2 m (3 ft 11 in).

== Design ==
The original design was based upon a common full-length hull upon which the different mission variants would be provided through reconfigured interiors and external equipment and weapons fitments. The design was later amended to include a version with a truncated rear hull and a rear flatbed cargo deck to support logistical variants.

=== Chassis and hull ===
The G5 is larger and heavier than the M113, with a gross weight of 26.5 t (58,000 lb). Maximum payload capacity is 8.5 t (19,000 lb)

The design is unusual in that it does not provide a hatch for the driver, who is instead located behind an armoured glass window. Maximised crew survivability is provided through a blast-resistant hull design providing mine and IED protection, and a decoupled floor to minimise the propagation of the blast to the interior. Ballistic protection against projectiles along with protection against fragments and splinters is provided through modular (applique) armour which can be easily increased for high-threat environments. Access to the rear troop/cargo compartment is provided through a large electrically operated ramp with a separately manually opening door.

The chassis features torsion bar suspension and hydraulic shock absorbers with six (6) road wheels each side.

=== Interior ===
The vehicle has a total of 14.5 m^{3} (510 cu ft) interior volume, which is greater than that for a M113.

Crew and troops are provided with individual blast-resistant ergonomically designed seats. The driver is provided with a window of armoured glass along with periscopes and day/night cameras. Rear troop seats are folding and include footrests to maximise combat capability even after an 8-hour cross country ride.

The interior, including stowages, is configurable for different mission parameters (e.g. ambulance, APC, etc.).

=== Powertrain ===
The engine is a MTU 6V199 TE21 turbo-diesel which is based upon the Mercedes-Benz OM 501 and features charge air cooling to increase power and reliability. Output is up to 460 kW of power and 2200 Nm of torque and is controlled by an electronic engine management system.

A ZF LSG 1000 HD automatic transmission with six (6) forward and two (2) reverse gears operates through a hydrodynamic torque converter and features a hydrostatic steering system which provides true pivot turns within the vehicle's own length.

Drive is through the front sprocket and uses single piece composite rubber tracks. The vehicle has a maximum on-road speed of 74 km/h (46 mph) and a range of up to 1,000 km (620 mi).

=== Systems ===
The vehicle features "Vectronics", the integration of modular communications and combat information systems, and provides:

- electronic displays
- integrated and expandable communication suites
- integrated and expandable battlefield management suites
- interfaces for weapon stations
- interfaces for power supplies to troops

A modular approach was adapted using COTS technologies and open-system standards wherever possible, so as to allow easier upgrade paths and reduced costs.

=== Weapons ===
Although the basic model is unarmed, most variants will feature a remote weapons station fitted with either a 7.62mm general-purpose machine gun (GPMG) or a 0.50 in heavy machine gun (HMG), although larger calibre weapons may be offered as an option. Unlike many vehicles against which it will compete for sales, a version with a crewed turret is not currently available.

== Variants ==
=== Variants to enter service ===
==== Armoured recovery vehicles ====
The Norwegian Army ordered several recovery module to MITE to be installed on the ACSV G5 (Miller Industries Towing Equipment) in June 2023, to be delivered in 2027.

It is designed to be able to recover vehicles ranging from 5 to 25 tons, such as the Iveco LMV, the Dingo 2 and the M113 for the Norwegian Army. The recovery module will be equipped with a crane for lifting and winching vehicles or parts of the vehicles and 2 arms to stabilise the vehicle.

==== Mobile radar system ====
The Norwegian Army ordered several ACSV G5 equipped with the Ground Master 200 MM/C radar for C-RAM missions.

==== National Manoeuvre Air Defence System (NOMADS) ====
It is a mobile ground based air-defence system designed by Kongsberg. Its features are:

- Sensors
  - Radar: Weibel Xenta-M5 which is used by Norway, but alternative options are possible.
  - Passive sensors: day / night camera and thermal camera
- Weapons
  - 4 AIM-9X Block II for Norway
  - 4 AIM-9X and 4 IRIS-T SLS are an option
- Command and control
  - NASAMS command and control heritage
  - Identification friend or foe (NATO mode 5 level 2)
- Protection systems
  - Remote weapon station equipped with passive sensors (day/night camera) and a thermal camera for the use of the active protection system soft kill NightFighter from Steelrock and the M2 Browning machine gun.

=== Prototypes and variants offered ===
==== Prototypes displayed by FFG ====
- Armoured Ambulance: Unarmed version with stripped interior giving room to carry either two stretchers or one stretcher and seating for three patients or medical staff. Storage for medical equipment is provided.
- Armoured Combat Support Vehicle (ACSV): Development of the Armoured Combat Support Vehicle saw the rear hull of the original design truncated and replaced with a rear flat cargo deck with a payload capacity of 8.5 tonnes, so as to carry interchangeable ISO 10-foot containers. It was this revised design which has entered production and as of 2022 is the only variant to have entered full-scale production.
- Armoured Personnel Carrier (APC): Basic variant equipped with a remote weapon station (RWS) fitted with either a MG 3 or FN MAG GPMG, or M2 HMG. The roof features a large double hatch over the rear troop compartment or optional individual troop hatches. Carries 10 to 12 troops.
- Command and Control Vehicle (CCV): This variant is equipped with a Dynamit Nobel Defence (DND) Dual FeWaS RWS equipped with a Rheinmetall RMG 12.7mm HMG and DND's ASL-90 twin launcher for its RGW 90-HH and RGW 90-AS rockets. It is also equipped with a Comrod Communication 5 m (16 ft) elevating mast which can be equipped with various sensor packages.
- Infantry Fighting Vehicle (IFV): Very similar to the APC variant, with additional applique armour, smoke dischargers and an Krauss-Maffei Wegmann FLW200+ RWS fitted with a Rheinmetall Rh-202 20mm autocannon. Troop capacity is possibly reduced to 8–10.
- Mortar carrier: Presented in 2025 at the DSEI fair. It is equipped with a 120 mm Ragnarok Mission Module designed in a 10-foot ISO container. The vehicle and the module are independent.

==== Potential variants ====
FFG originally proposed the following variants: (Note: Given that instead of similar variants of the PMMC G5, in 2018 Norway chose the Leopard 2-based WiSENT 2 armoured engineer vehicle and Leguan armoured vehicle-launched bridge and in 2021 placed an order for further CV90 infantry fighting vehicles to supplement its existing fleet, and along with limited sales to date it is highly doubtful that further variants of this vehicle other than those already in production will be developed.)

- Ambulance
- Armoured Personnel Carrier
- Command & Control
- Engineer's Fitter
- Explosive Ordnance Disposal
- Infantry Fighting Vehicle
- Joint Fire Support Team
- Mortar Carrier
- Reconnaissance
- Repair & Recovery
- Short Range Air Defence
- Transport & Logistics

== Operators ==
=== Current operators ===
Norway (50 ordered as of June 2024)
In May 2018 the Norwegian Defence Material Agency announced it had a signed a contract for the purchase of 51 of the Armoured Combat Support Vehicle (ACSV) variant of the G5, with a potential for future orders of between 75 and 150 vehicles. The first vehicles are expected to enter service with the Norwegian Army in summer 2022.
Detailed orders:
- 6 NOMADS (National Manoeuvre Air Defence System), a mobile ground based air-defence ordered in 2019, with 4 handed over as of July 2024, but not yet operational.
- 8 C-RAM mobile radar system Ground Master 200 MM/C to be delivered i 2025.
  - 25 May 2021, 5 radars ordered in collaboration with the Netherlands with an option for 3 additional radars.
  - 24 November 2022, 3 additional radars ordered.
- 7 (+ option for 2) armoured recovery vehicles. The recovery module was ordered to MITE (Miller Industries Towing Equipment) in June 2023, to be delivered in 2027.

=== Future operators ===
Netherlands (~450)
In June 2023, the Ministry of Defence of the Netherlands announced its plan to purchase 45 of the Norwegian M-GBAD air-defence system based on the PMMC-G5 (ACSV). The systems are expected to be available in 2028. This mobile system will replace the Fennek equipped with the FIM-92 Stinger missiles. In 2023 he Dutch government informed the parliament of the interest to order 100 to 150 ACSV G5 as support vehicles for the 43rd Heavy Mechanised Brigade. The vehicle is referred as the "Combat General Purpose Vehicle".

In 2024, Kongsberg announced that the system was named "NOMADS". These are derivatives of the NASAMS 3 air-defence system, fitted with a Weibel Xenta-M radar, and they can integrate AIM-9X, AIM-9X Block II and IRIS-T SLS missiles, and therefore reach up to 15 km.

In June 2024, it was specified that the Dutch Army is expecting 18 launch vehicles, but the Netherlands is looking for a solution with additional missiles on the system. And it is possible that additional ACSV G5 will be acquired for the command of the batteries.

In October 2024 it was announced the Netherlands will acquire 18 NOMADS launch vehicles and 5 command vehicles on the ACSV G5 platform.

On January 29, 2025, it was announced that the Dutch Army is acquiring a total of 22 Skyranger 30 mobile anti-drone gun systems, which will be operated by the Joint Ground-based Air Defence Command (Dutch: Defensie Grondgebonden Luchtverdedigingscommando, DGLC). These will be mounted on the Armoured Combat Support Vehicle (ACSV) tracked platform. Delivery of the first systems is planned for 2028. This brings the total number of vehicles operated by the Netherlands armed forces to 45.

In October 2026 the Dutch Ministry of Defence announced the order for 400-450 ACSV in various versions.

=== Potential operators ===
Ukraine
As of 2024, the German government is considering the purchase of the "NOMADS" mobile ground air-defence system for Ukraine, equipped with IRIS-T SLS missiles, and depending on other countries' participation, another radar could be integrated.
At Eurosatory 2026, FFG announced that they had a third customer for this vehicle, Ukraine is the likely one.

=== Failed bids ===
Denmark
In 2014 the Royal Danish Army trialled the G5 as a replacement for is ageing fleet of M113-based vehicles. In May 2015 the Danish Defence Acquisition and Logistic Organisation announced the Piranha V as the successful candidate. The competition included:
- Wheeled vehicles
  - Piranha V (GDELS Mowag)
  - VBCI (Nexter)
- Tracked vehicles
  - ASCOD 2 (GDELS SBS)
  - CV90 Armadillo (BAE Systems-Hägglunds)

== Similar vehicles ==
- Namer
- AIFV
- FV432
- Universal Track Carrier LPG
- M113
- FNSS ACV-30
- ACV-300
- Hunter AFV
- Kurganets-25
- FNSS ZAHA
