= M98 camouflage pattern =

Standard Norwegian camouflage pattern

M/98 camouflage pattern
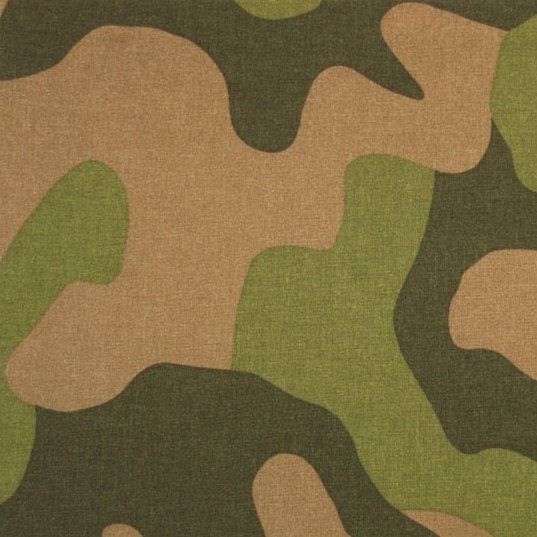
- M/98 camo pattern swatch
- Type: Military camouflage pattern
- Place of origin: Norway

Service history
- In service: 1998-Present
- Used by: See Users

Production history
- Variants: See Variants

The M/98 is the standard Norwegian camouflage pattern.

== History ==
Introduced around 1998, it is an updated version of the older model M/75, and is used together with different hats according to military branch. The uniform consists of jacket and trousers and comes in the 3-color Norwegian camouflage.

In 2025, the M25 uniform system (or the Norwegian Combat Uniform) was introduced to the Norwegian military, which will eventually replace the M98.

== Design ==
The jacket has two breast pockets and two big hand pockets, both with flap and a sewn on velcro above left breast pocket for the name tag. The trousers have regular pockets for hands - one back pocket and cargo pockets with flap.

The camouflage colors of the uniform consist of DarkOliveGreen (#556B2F), YellowGreen (#9ACD32) and Tan (D2B48C).

A special desert pattern has also been developed for the wars in Afghanistan and Iraq, consisting of light green, brown and dark brown.

== Variants ==
=== M/03 ===
The M/03 is documented with Norwegian troops operating in arid conditions.

=== Others ===
A similar uniform pattern is used by the Democratic Republic of Congo army from an unknown source.

== Users ==
- Chechnya: Used on uniforms wore by some high-ranking officials, notably the head of the republic Ramzan Kadyrov, as well as the Kadyrovites. How the uniforms were obtained remains unknown.
- Democratic Republic of the Congo: Known to be used by the FARDC.
- Norway: Used by the Norwegian Armed Forces.
