= NOMADS ground-based air defence system =

NOMADS
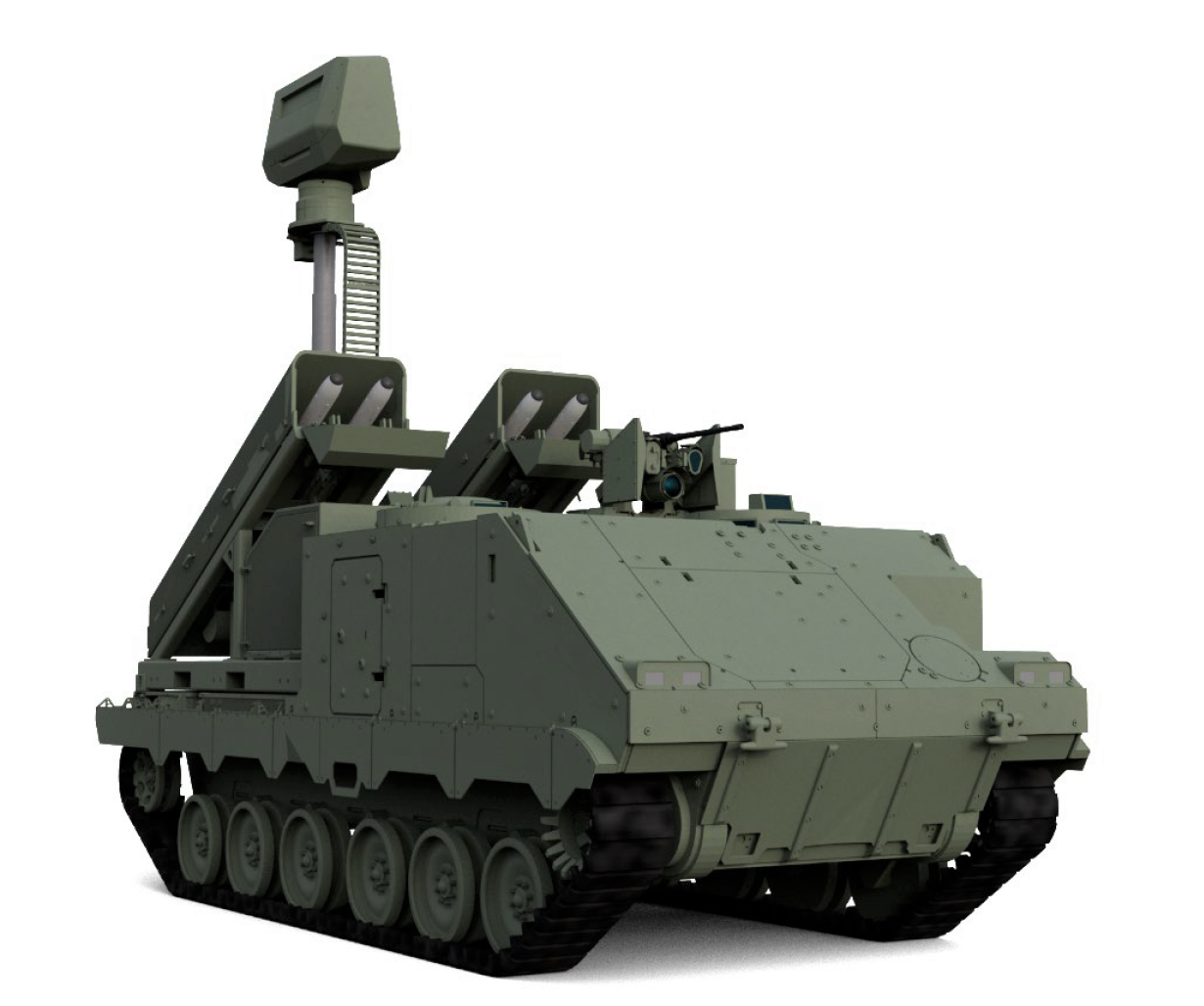
- Type: Mobile ground base air defence system
- Place of origin: Norway

Service history
- In service: Planned to enter service in 2026
- Used by: See #Operators

Production history
- Designer: Kongsberg Defence & Aerospace
- Designed: Since 2019
- Manufacturer: System: Kongsberg Defence & Aerospace; Vehicle: Flensburger Fahrzeugbau
- Developed from: Kongsberg NASAMS
- Produced: Since 2024

Specifications
- Mass: 26.0 t (57,300 lb)
- Length: 6,928 mm (22.730 ft)
- Width: 2,996 mm (9.829 ft)
- Height: 3,050 mm (10.01 ft)
- Main armament: 4 × IRIS-T SLS, or; 4 × AIM-9x Block 2
- Secondary armament: Kongsberg Protector RS4 RWS with a M2 Browning HMG
- Engine: MTU 6V199 TE21 (multi-fuel); 460 kW (630 PS); 2,400 N⋅m (1,800 ft⋅lb)
- Power/weight: 17.7 kW/t (24.1 PS/t)
- Transmission: ZF Friedrichshafen LSG 1000 HD automatic transmission (6 speed forward, 2 backwards)
- Suspension: Torsion bar
- Operational range: 600 km (370 mi) + 12 hours of operation
- Maximum speed: 74 km/h (46 mph)
- Guidance system: Weibel XENTA-M5 radar

The NOMADS (NatiOnal Maneuver Air Defence System) is a short range mobile ground base air defence system designed and made by Kongsberg Defence & Aerospace.

The system is designed to protect a manoeuvring army, transportation routes, convoys, command centres, logistical hubs in a dynamic environment from targets such as aircraft, helicopters, cruise missiles and all types of unmanned aerial vehicles.

== History ==
In October 2019, the Norwegian Army signed a contract for the development of a mobile ground based air defence system worth NOK 583 million. It is designed with short range capabilities objectives, a capability to be used off-road, to be equipped with modern missiles, and an AESA radar.

A demonstration of the system took place in 2023.

In June 2024, the mobile GBAD system was unveiled for the first time, and the name of the system was unveiled as well NOMADS.

== Design ==
The NOMADS is an air defence module for armoured vehicles that is designed to lock on standard 10-foot ISO container twist locks.

=== Platform ===
The primary platform for which the module was designed is the ACSV G5 from the German company FFG (Flensburger Fahrzeugbau GmbH). However, the module could equip any vehicle that would have the dimensions, the payload and stability requirements met.

==== ACSV G5 ====
The ACSV G5 is an armoured tracked vehicle with a capability to be used offroad. It uses the Composite Rubber Track system supplied by the Canadian company Soucy.

As part of the vehicle design philosophy, it is approached with a high degree of standardisation, such as:

- Extensive use of MOTS (military off the shelf) and COTS (commercial off the shelf) products and parts. These include existing mechanical parts that are already battle-proven (engine, transmission, tracks, suspension).
- Electronic components of the vehicle:
  - Compliant with the NGVA standards (NATO Generic Vehicle Architecture).
  - Compliant with electromagnetic compatibility (EMC).
  - Data security by complying with the concept of red and black networks.

It is a multi-mission vehicle that is being used by Norway for several other roles, and will be used by the Netherlands as a command vehicle for the air-defence batteries. It was also announced in April 2025 that the Netherlands had an interest for a larger order of ACSV G5. That would include 100 to 150 vehicles.

=== Effectors ===
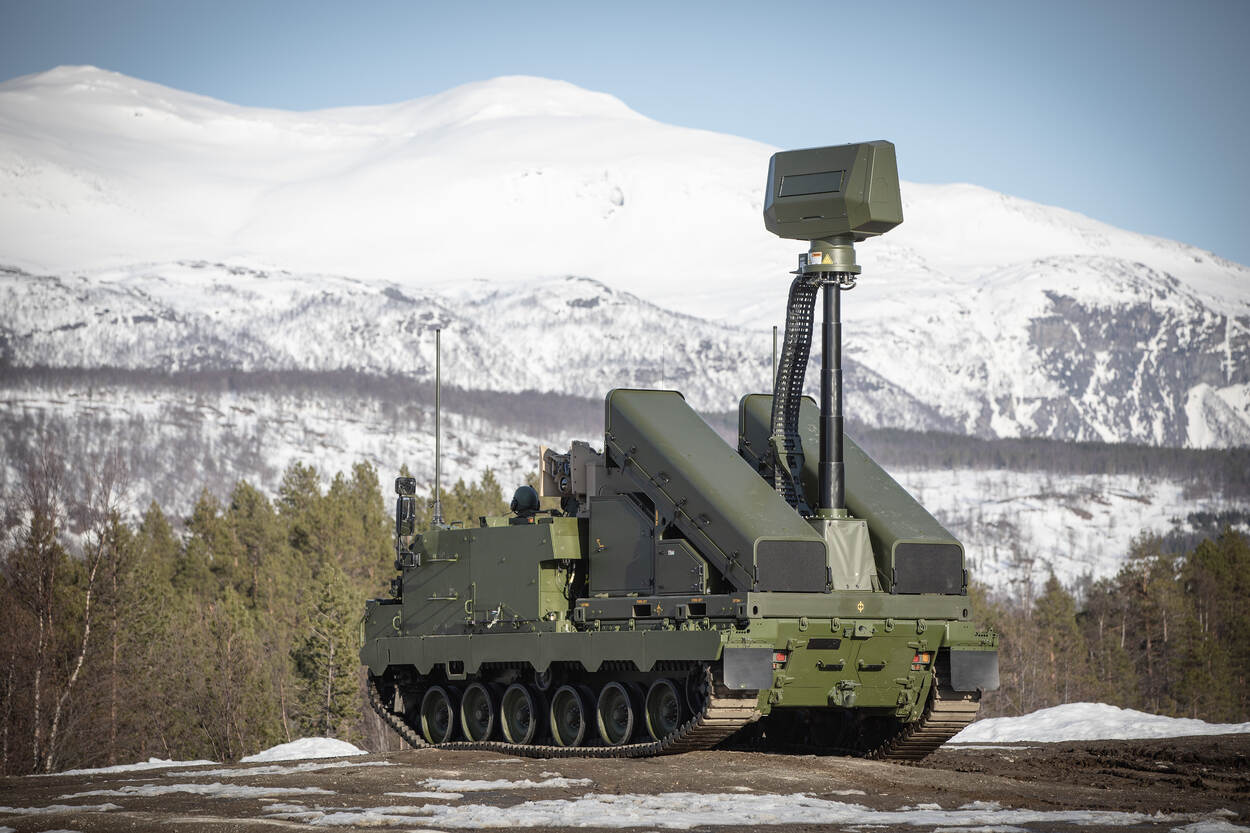
NOMADS Air defence system ready to fire

The NOMADS is equipped with 3 effectors:

- 4 × surface to air missiles that are installed in two launcher canisters, one on each side of the vehicle. When the system gets into position, the canisters are raised.
- A remote weapon station.
- As an option, a RF directional jammer can be installed.

==== Primary effectors - surface-to-air missiles ====
===== IRIS-T SLS =====
The NOMADS was developed to fire the IRIS-T SLS missile. It is the same missile as the air-to-air variant. And launched from the ground, it has a range of 12 km (7.5 mi) and a flight ceiling of 8 km (26,000 ft).

Some trials took place in summer 2023 with this missile.

The reason for this choice came from the fact that Norway used that missile with its F-16, 150 missiles were initially purchased. As Norway retired the F-16, and replaced it with the F-35A which cannot use the IRIS-T missile, it was decided to reuse the missile with its air-defence systems, the NOMADS and the NASAMS. However, in the summer of 2023, Ukraine needed some additional air-defence munitions. As Germany provided IRIS-T SLS and IRIS-T SLM air defence fire units, Norway decided to donate its remaining missiles.

Norway could have continued to use the IRIS-T SLS as its range is longer, but a major share of the production of the missiles is dedicated to Ukraine.

===== AIM-9X Block 2 =====
Norway already used the AIM-9X Block 2 with its NASAMS and its F-35A, it became the obvious choice for this NOMADS. With the AIM-9X Block 2, the range mentioned by Kongsberg is 10 km (6.2 mi).

==== Secondary effectors ====
===== Remote weapon station =====
A remote weapon station can be installed on the system. Kongsberg presented the NOMADS at Eurosatory 2024 with the Protector RS4 RWS equipped with a M2 Browning HMG.

===== RF directional jammer =====
Kongsberg presented the NOMADS at Eurosatory 2024 with a Blackrock jammer as a counter-UAS system, although no information suggests that this option was chosen by the Norwegian Army.

=== Sensors ===
==== Radars ====
The radar selected by Norway and the Netherlands for the NOMADS is the Weibel Scientific XENTA-M5. The XENTA-M radar family is used as 3D radars for surveillance and target tracking of aerial objects and it can be used on the move. The radar works on the X-band, it is made of GaN TRM, and it is designed for a 360° coverage as it rotates at a speed of 60 rpm. It is able to follow high and low speed targets, large aircraft, missiles and small UAVs.

In May 2025, Kongsberg signed a contract with Weibel Scientific for a batch of radars to be supplied in 2026 and 2027. The contract had a value of DKr 500 million (the equivalent of USD $75 million). The radars are manufactured in Denmark.

Kongsberg mentioned that the system was designed to use other radars that have a similar role, the following radars are suitable options for a SHORAD role:

- Saab Giraffe 1X 3D multi-mission radar
- Hensoldt Spexer 2000M 3D MkIII
- Oerlikon AMMR 2.0 (AESA Multi-Mission Radar, Rheinmetall Air Defence Italia)

==== Sensors for the remote weapon station ====
The remote weapon station is equipped with both active sensors (laser range finder) and passive sensors (a day/night camera, and a thermal camera).

=== Communications and C2 (command and control) ===
==== Command and control ====
The NOMADS inherits some of the NASAMS C2 functions and applications. It is interoperable with NATO data links and protocols, and therefore it can integrate NATO IAMD (Integrated Air and Missile Defence).

==== Communications ====
The NOMADS is equipped with VHF and UHF radio systems. It uses an IFF (identification friend or foe) NATO Mode 5 Level 2.

The NOMADS system is capable of operating as part of a distributed network operation. It can use both the Link 16 and the JREAP-C (Joint Range Extension Applications Protocol - variant C) as tactical data links.

== Operators ==
=== Future operators ===
Norway (6)
6 NOMADS ordered in 2019, with 4 handed over as of July 2024, but not yet operational.
Netherlands (18)
As part of the CITADEL programme, the Ministry of Defence of the Netherlands announced selecting the Norwegian Kongsberg M-GBAD air-defence system based on the ACSV G5 in June 2023, with deliveries expected in 2028 and 2029. These vehicles will eventually replace the 18 Fennek SWP (Stinger Weapon Platform) equipped with 4 FIM-92 Stinger missiles.
In November 2024, the Netherlands signed a contract for the delivery of:
- NASAMS-3 systems
- 18 NOMADS air defence systems
- 6 command vehicles based on the ACSV G5
In September 2026, a contract was signed for a complementary order.
Ukraine
As of June 2026, Germany announced its intention to finance the purchase of NOMADS systems for Ukraine.
