= Flensburger Fahrzeugbau =

German military vehicle manufacturing company

- Type: GmbH
- Industry: Automotive, Defense
- Founded: 1872; 154 years ago
- Headquarters: Flensburg, Germany
- Area served: Worldwide
- Key people: Norbert Erichsen (CEO)
- Revenue: ca. 158 Mio. EUR (2017)
- Number of employees: 930
- Website: www.ffg-flensburg.de

The Flensburger Fahrzeugbau Gesellschaft mbH (FFG) (Flensburg Vehicle Manufacturing Company) is a medium-sized company based in Flensburg, Germany. It operates in the military vehicle manufacturing, maintenance, and business upgrade sectors.

== History ==
The origin of the FFG is in the FSG (Flensburger Schiffbau-Gesellschaft), which was founded in 1872. The FSG built sailing ships for one year and soon after the first steamship has been built. Special attention has always been given to mechanical engineering. In the 1960s the German Armed Forces were looking for a partner to service their military vehicles and equipment. The FFG was an ideal partner and for over 50 years there is a standing framework agreement between the German Armed Forces and FFG for equipping, overhauling and maintaining armoured tracked and wheeled vehicles.

In 1963 the FSG division of tracked vehicles was created. 1980 the FFG was founded as a separate entity. Nowadays the FFG is operating in the defence industry and in Environmental Technology with customers in more than 40 countries. The company has grown quickly in the last decades. In 2020 more than 900 employees work for the FFG worldwide.

The FFG has multiple apprenticeships available in the trade and commercial sectors. With constantly more than 40 apprentices on premises the FFG is one of the companies with the most apprentices in the region. In 2010, 2014 and 2015 the FFG was awarded the first place by the IHK for the best company for apprentices.

== Location ==
The FFG is located next to the main harbours in Flensburg which were the former docklands of the FSG. In 2013 the FFG bought the Danfoss works premises which is located in northern part Flensburg just 3 km away.

== Field of activity ==
The FFGs key areas of operations include maintenance, overhaul and production of tracked and wheeled vehicles domestically and internationally. In addition to the production of aluminium CNC-milled parts the FFG is competent and certified in all forms of welding and hydraulic engineering.

The FFG is organised in four divisions:

=== WT/I Military Technology Maintenance and Overhaul ===
WT/I is the department with the most employees. The complete overhaul and the repair of complete systems and assemblies of armoured vehicles are its focus. WT/I is specialised in repair of military equipment up to the highest military standards. More than 50 employees of the field service are operating worldwide.

=== WT/P Military Programs ===
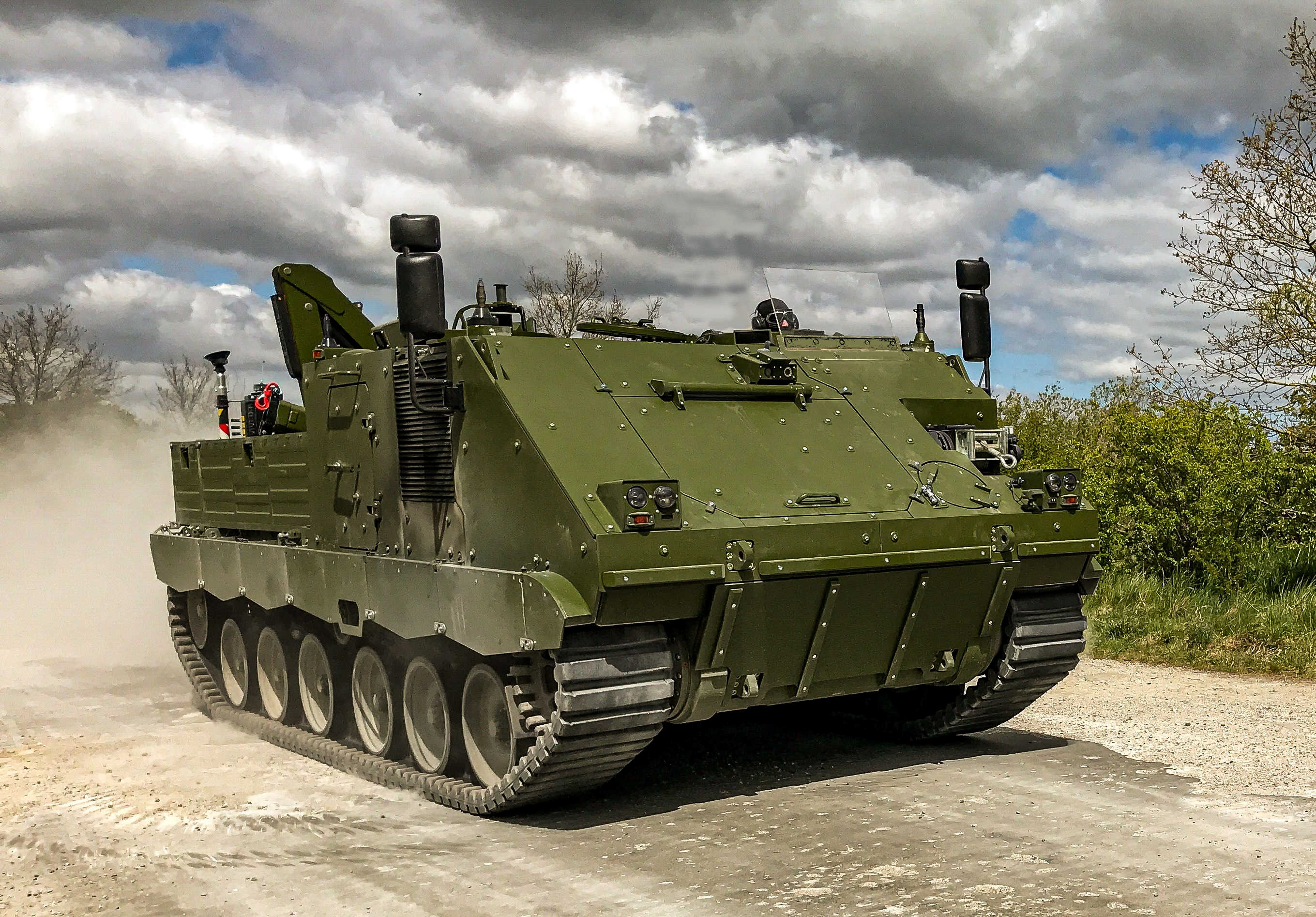
The new Armored Combat Support Vehicle (ACSV) is based on FFG's PMMC G5. The ACSV is a versatile tracked platform, available either in open or closed hull configurations, and is intended to be the base of several new types of support vehicles for the Norwegian Army, including SHORAD, artillery hunting radar, electronic warfare and logistics support variants.

The division WT/P is responsible for the upgrade, conversion and development of all types of military vehicles up to a weight of 40 tones. This includes tracked and wheeled vehicles of both western and Russian origin. Example programs include role conversion, life extension, powerpack replacement or "Repowering", customised protection and system house management. The development of the Protected Mission Module Carrier (PMMC) G5, the Armoured Combat Support Vehicle (ACSV) G5 and multiple technology demonstration vehicles and concepts are products of WT/P.

=== WT/A Drive Technology ===
Since the founding of the FFG, WT/A has been a permanent department. The main area of responsibility of this division is mobile, stationary and offshore applications. This involves new and further developments as well as the repair of various engine and transmission variants or and complete drives. The range of products and services in the steel and aluminium processing extends from individual production to the design of entire assemblies. In addition to a construction and project department, FFG's drive technology department has production centres in the fields of material cutting, hydraulics, electricity and surface treatment.

=== ST Special Technology ===
The division ST was often restructured in the past. Soon after, the division of Special Technology was founded. This development is the result of the structural changes of the armies and their requests. The products range from the armoured recovery vehicle (ARV) with a 30-tonne crane to the armoured engineer vehicle (AEV) with articulated arm excavator and the demining tank (MC). The MC has a mine clearance plough for tactical mine clearance.

== Subsidiaries ==
=== FFG Canada LTD. ===
FFG Canada Ltd. was founded in 2012 as part of a joint venture between the FFG and the Canadian Industrial Rubber Company Ltd. Its main task was the assembly of the Canadian WiSENT AEV project which is based on the Leopard 2. The FFG Canada Ltd. is located in Bathurst, New Brunswick.

=== FFG Environmental Technology GmbH & Co. KG ===
On the first of January 2017 the division Environmental Technology was created as a separate entity from the rest of the FFG. Environmental Technology specialises in the construction of suction and flushing applications.

=== JWT Jungenthal Wehrtechnik GmbH ===
JWT was founded in 1885 as Arnold Jung locomotive. Since 2007 the company is based in Kirchen as subsidiary of the FFG. JWT is specialised in the construction of vehicle chassis, bodies and recovery equipment for armoured vehicles. The product range extends also to the repair and new production of assemblies for recovery equipment, brake systems, tanks and drive mechanisms.

=== Rexxon GmbH ===
Rexxon develops and produces climate control systems for civilian and military vehicles. Rexxon is like the FFG located at the former Danfoss works premises.

=== FTN Fahrzeugtechnik Nord GmbH ===
FTN produces and rents out wheeled and special-purpose vehicles as well as mobile bridges. Since 2012 the company operates under the name of FTN Fahrzeugtechnik Nord GmbH.
