= List of MTU Friedrichshafen military engines =

This page lists the military engines of MTU Friedrichshafen.

== List of engines for military vehicles ==
This section focuses on past, present and future engines for military vehicles.

=== Engines for indirect fire vehicles ===
This section lists the mortar and artillery systems powered by MTU engines.

Engine	Vehicle type	Vehicle	Vehicle based on (chassis)	Power	Origin	Notes
MB 833 Ka-500	SPH Self-propelled howitzer	VCA Palmaria Vehículo de Combate Artillería	Tanque Argentino Mediano	720 hp (540 kW)	Argentina Italy	20 manufactured, with OTO Melara turret, entered service in 1982.
MB 833 Aa-501	SPH Self-propelled howitzer	M44T	M44 SPH	450 hp (340 kW)	Turkey Germany United States	Modernisation of Turkish self-propelled guns dating from 1986.
MB 833 Aa-501	SPH Self-propelled howitzer	M52T	M52 SPH	450 hp (340 kW)	Turkey Germany United States	Modernisation of Turkish self-propelled guns dating from 1993.
MB 837 Ea-500	SPH Self-propelled howitzer	Palmaria	OF-40	750 hp (560 kW)	Italy	Bought by Libya, Nigeria, entered service in 1982.
MB 837 Ba-500	SPH Self-propelled howitzer	Panzerkanone 68	Panzer 61	660 hp (490 kW)	Switzerland	1972 (prototype, didn't enter service).
MB 871 Ka-501	SPH Self-propelled howitzer	SP70	—	1,200 PS (880 kW)	Germany United Kingdom United States	1970-80s (prototype, didn't enter service).
MT 881 Ka-500	SPH Self-propelled howitzer	PzH 2000	—	999 PS (735 kW)	Germany	Entered service in 1998, still in production.
MT 881 Ka-500	SPH Self-propelled howitzer	K9 Thunder	K9 Thunder	999 PS (735 kW)	South Korea	Entered service in 1999.
MT 881 Ka-500	Ammunition Resupply Vehicle	K10 ARV Ammunition Resupply Vehicle	K9 Thunder	999 PS (735 kW)	South Korea	Entered service in early 2000s.
MT 881 Ka-500	Artillery command vehicle	K11 FDCV Fire Direction Control Vehicle	K9 Thunder	999 PS (735 kW)	South Korea	Entered service in the 2020s with Egypt.
MT 881 Ka-500	SPH Self-propelled howitzer	AHS Krab	K9 Thunder	999 PS (735 kW)	Poland South Korea	Entered service in 2016.
MT 881 Ka-500	SPH Self-propelled howitzer	T-155 Fırtına	K9 Thunder	999 PS (735 kW)	Turkey South Korea	Entered service in 2005.
6V199 TE20 FFG G4 Powerpack	Artillery command vehicle	Artillery command vehicle on a tracked chassis	Universal Track Carrier LPG	350 hp (260 kW)	Poland	Since 2009.
6V199 TE20	Mortar carrier	Piranha IV 8×8 - "12 cm Mörser 16"	Piranha IV	544 hp (406 kW)	Switzerland	To enter service in 2025.
8V199 TE20	SPH Self-propelled howitzer	DONAR Artillery gun module	ASCOD 2	720 PS (530 kW)	Austria Spain Germany	Prototype from the 2010s.
8V199 TE21	SPH Self-propelled howitzer	RCH-155 - Boxer Remote-controlled howitzer	Boxer A3	820 PS (600 kW)	Germany Netherlands United Kingdom	To enter service in 2025 with Ukraine.
8V199 TE23	SPH Self-propelled howitzer	NEMESIS	ASCOD 2	1,070 hp (800 kW)	Austria Spain Germany	

=== Engines for main battle tanks ===
Engine	Vehicle type	Vehicle	Vehicle based on (chassis)	Power	Origin	Notes
MB 833 Ka-501	MBT Main battle tank	AMX-30EM2	AMX-30E	850 PS (630 kW)	Spain France	Modernised AMX-30E, replacing HS-110 with MTU engine from 1990.
MB 837 Ba-500	MBT Main battle tank	Panzer 58	Panzer 58	600 PS (440 kW)	Switzerland	Prototype from 1957.
MB 837 Ba-500	MBT Main battle tank	Panzer 61	Panzer 61	630 PS (460 kW)	Switzerland	Entered service in 1966.
MB 837 Ba-500	MBT Main battle tank	Panzer 68	Panzer 61	660 PS (490 kW)	Switzerland	Entered service in 1970.
MB 837 Ba-500	Target tank	Zielfahrzeug 68	Panzer 61	660 PS (490 kW)	Switzerland	Entered service in 1972.
MB 838 CaM 500	MBT Main battle tank	OF-40	OF-40	830 hp (620 kW)	Italy	Purchased by the United Arab Emirates, entered service in 1980.
MB 838 CaM 500	MBT Main battle tank	Leopard 1	Leopard 1	830 PS (610 kW)	Germany	Entered service in 1965.
MB 838 Ca-501	MBT Main battle tank	OF-40 Mk.III	OF-40	950 PS (700 kW)	Italy	
MB 838 Ka-501	MBT Main battle tank	Arjun Mk1 / Mk1A	Arjun	1,380 hp (1,030 kW)	India	Entered service in 2004. Possible joint production with Indian defence PSU.
MB 871 Ka-501	MBT Main battle tank	K1 tank	K1 tank	1,200 PS (880 kW)	South Korea	Entered service in 1987.
MB 873 Ka-500	MBT Main battle tank	MBT-70	MBT-70	1,500 hp (1,100 kW)	United States Germany	Prototype only in the 1960s.
MB 873 Ka-501	MBT Main battle tank	Leopard 2	Leopard 2	1,500 hp (1,100 kW)	Germany	Entered service in 1979.
MB 873 Ka-501	MBT Main battle tank	Stridsvagn 122 and Stridsvagn 123	Leopard 2	1,500 hp (1,100 kW)	Germany Sweden	Entered service in 1997.
MB 873 Ka-501	MBT Main battle tank	Panther KF51	Panther KF51	1,500 hp (1,100 kW)	Germany	To be purchased by Hungary and Italy, and planned to enter service by 2027-28.
MT 881 KA-501	MBT Main battle tank	M60T Sabra Mk.II / Mk.III	M60 tank	1,000 hp (750 kW)	United States Israel Turkey	Turkish M60A3/E60B upgrade of the Sabra M60MBT carried out in 2008.
MT 883 Ka-500 Europowerpack	MBT Main battle tank	Challenger 2	Challenger 2	1,500 hp (1,100 kW)	United Kingdom	Variant purchased by Oman, entered service in 1993.
MT 883 Ka-500 Europowerpack	MBT Main battle tank	Leclerc tropicalisé	Leclerc	1,500 hp (1,100 kW)	France	Variant purchased by the UAE, entered service in 1995.
MT 883 Ka-500 EuroPowerPack improved	MBT Main battle tank	Leopard 2	Leopard 2	1,650 hp (1,230 kW)	Germany	First prototype of the new EuroPowerPack installed in a Leopard 2 in 2002.
MT 883 Ka-500 Europowerpack	MBT Main battle tank	Merkava Mk.4	Merkava	1,500 hp (1,100 kW)	Israel	Entered service in 2004. Engine license produced by General Dynamics in the USA.
MT 883 Ka-501 Europowerpack	MBT Main battle tank	K2 Black Panther - Batch I	K2 Black Panther	1,500 hp (1,100 kW)	South Korea	Entered service in 2014, only used with the first batch of 100 K2.
8V199 TE23	MBT Main battle tank	Leopard 1 (modernised)	Leopard 1	1,070 hp (800 kW)	Germany	New engine available as of 2024 for the Leopard 1 if countries want to modernise it.
10V199	MBT Main battle tank	Leopard 2	Leopard 2	1,500 hp (1,100 kW)	Germany	Alternative engine for the Leopard 2 in development as of March 2025.
12V199	MBT Main battle tank	–	–	1,835 hp (1,368 kW)	Germany	

=== Engines for engineering vehicles based on main battle tanks ===
This list includes engines for armoured engineering vehicles, recovery vehicles, support vehicles and bridging vehicles based on main battle tanks.

Engine	Vehicle type	Vehicle	Vehicle based on (chassis)	Power	Origin	Notes
MB 837 Ba-500	ARV Armoured recovery vehicle	Entpannungspanzer 65	Panzer 61	660 hp (490 kW)	Switzerland	Entered service in the Swiss Army in 1972.
MB 837 Ba-500	AVLB Armoured vehicle-launched bridge	Brückenpanzer 68	Panzer 61	660 hp (490 kW)	Switzerland	Entered service in the Swiss Army in 1976.
MB 838 Ca-500	ARV Armoured recovery vehicle	Bergepanzer 2	Leopard 1	830 PS (610 kW)	Germany	Entered service in 1966.
MB 838 Ca-500	AVLB Armoured vehicle-launched bridge	Biber	Leopard 1	830 PS (610 kW)	Germany	Entered service in 1973.
MB 838 Ca-500	AEV Armoured engineering vehicle	PiPz 2A1 Dachs	Leopard 1	830 PS (610 kW)	Germany	Entered service in 1989.
MB 838 CaM-500	ARV Armoured recovery vehicle	WiSENT 1	Leopard 1	960 PS (710 kW)	Germany	An upgrade of the Bergepanzer 2.
MB 838 CaM-500	AEV Armoured engineering vehicle	WiSENT 1	Leopard 1	960 PS (710 kW)	Germany	
MB 838 CaM-500	MCV Mine clearing vehice	WiSENT 1	Leopard 1	960 PS (710 kW)	Germany	
MB 871 Ka-501	MCV Mine clearing vehice	Keiler	M48 Patton	1,100 PS (810 kW)	Germany United States	Entered service in 1994.
MB 871 Ka-501	ARV Armoured recovery vehicle	K1 Recovery	K1 tank	1,200 PS (880 kW)	South Korea	Entered service in 1993.
MB 871 Ka-501	AVLB Armoured vehicle-launched bridge	K1 Bridge layer	K1 tank	1,200 PS (880 kW)	South Korea	Entered service in 1993.
MB 871 Ka-501	AEV Armoured engineering vehicle	K600 Rhino CEV	K1 tank	1,200 PS (880 kW)	South Korea	Entered service in 2019
MB 873 Ka-501	ARV Armoured recovery vehicle	BPz3 Büffel	Leopard 2	1,500 hp (1,100 kW)	Germany	Entered service in 1992.
MB 873 Ka-501	AVLB Armoured vehicle-launched bridge	Leguan bridge layer (Leopard 2)	Leopard 2	1,500 hp (1,100 kW)	Germany	Entered service in 2018.
MB 873 Ka-501	AEV Armoured engineering vehicle	AEV 3 Kodiak	Leopard 2	1,500 hp (1,100 kW)	Germany Switzerland	Entered service in 2009.
MB 873 Ka-501	MCV Mine clearing vehice	Rheinmetall Keiler NG	Leopard 2	1,500 hp (1,100 kW)	Germany	New vehicle in development.
MB 873 Ka-501	ARV Armoured recovery vehicle	FFG WiSENT 2 ARV	Leopard 2	1,500 hp (1,100 kW)	Germany	Entered service in 2017.
MB 873 Ka-501	AVLB Armoured vehicle-launched bridge	FFG WiSENT 2 BL	Leopard 2	1,500 hp (1,100 kW)	Germany	Entered service in 2017.
MB 873 Ka-501	AEV Armoured engineering vehicle	FFG WiSENT 2 AEV	Leopard 2	1,500 hp (1,100 kW)	Germany	Entered service in 2017.
MB 873 Ka-501	MCV Mine clearing vehice	FFG WiSENT 2 MC	Leopard 2	1,500 hp (1,100 kW)	Germany	Entered service in 2017.
MT 883 Ka-500 Europowerpack	AVLB Armoured vehicle-launched bridge	Merkava AVLB	Merkava	1,500 hp (1,100 kW)	Israel	Supplied to the Philippines in 2022.
MT 883 Ka-500	ARV Armoured recovery vehicle	Char de dépannage DNG/DCL	Leclerc	1,500 hp (1,100 kW)	France	Variant purchased by the UAE and France, and entered service in 1995.
8V199 TE23	ARV Armoured recovery vehicle	WiSENT 1	Leopard 1	1,070 hp (800 kW)	Germany	New engine available for the modernisation of the WiSENT 1 as of 2024.
8V199 TE23	AEV Armoured engineering vehicle	WiSENT 1	Leopard 1	1,070 hp (800 kW)	Germany	New engine available for the modernisation of the WiSENT 1 as of 2024.
8V199 TE23	MCV Mine clearing vehice	WiSENT 1	Leopard 1	1,070 hp (800 kW)	Germany	New engine available for the modernisation of the WiSENT 1 as of 2024.

=== Engines for medium and light tanks ===
Engine	Vehicle type	Vehicle	Vehicle based on (chassis)	Power	Origin	Notes
MB 833 Ka-500	Medium tank	TAM "Tanque Argentino Mediano"	TAM	720 hp (540 kW)	Argentina Germany	Entered service in 1983.
MB 833 Ka-500	Medium tank	TH-301 / Rh-105-30	Marder	800 hp (600 kW)	Germany	Prototype developed in the 1970s.
MB 837 Ea-500	Medium tank	M48A5 (G Export)	M48 Patton	750 PS (550 kW)	Germany United States	Used by Turkey.
MB 837 Ka-501	Medium tank	Super M48	M48 Patton	1,000 PS (740 kW)	Germany United States	5 prototypes built by KMW in 1994.
8V199 TE20	Medium tank	WPB Anders	Universal Modular Tracked Platform	720 hp (540 kW)	Poland	Prototype presented in 2011.
8V199 TE20	Light tank	Sabrah	ASCOD 2	720 hp (540 kW)	Israel Spain	In service in March 2024 with the Philippines.
8V199 TE21	Medium tank	M10 Booker	ASCOD 2	800 hp (600 kW)	United States	Entered service with the US Army in 2024.

=== Engines for tank hunters ===
Engine	Vehicle type	Vehicle	Vehicle based on (chassis)	Power	Origin	Notes
MB 837 Aa	Tank destroyer	Kanonenjagdpanzer	Jaguar 1	500 hp (370 kW)	Germany	Entered service in 1965.
MB 837 Aa	Tank destroyer (anti tank missile carrier)	Jaguar 1	Jaguar 1	500 hp (370 kW)	Germany	Entered service in 1968.
MB 837 Aa	Tank destroyer (anti tank missile carrier)	Jaguar 2 - Raketenjagdpanzer 2	Jaguar 1	500 hp (370 kW)	Germany	Entered service in 1983.

=== Engines for tracked armoured fighting vehicles ===
Engine	Vehicle type	Vehicle	Vehicle based on (chassis)	Power	Origin	Notes
MB 833 Ea-500	IFV Infantry fighting vehicle	Marder 1	Marder	600 PS (440 kW)	Germany	First generation of the Marder that entered service in 1971.
MB 833 Ka-500	AFV Armoured fighting vehicle	VCTP Vehículo de Combate de Transporte de Personal	TH-302 VCTP	720 hp (540 kW)	Germany Argentina	In service since 1976.
MT 881 Ka-500	IFV Infantry fighting vehicle	Marder 2	Marder	999 PS (735 kW)	Germany	Prototype in the early 1990s.
MT 881 Ka-500	IFV Infantry fighting vehicle	K21 Redback	K21	999 PS (735 kW)	South Korea Australia	Will enter service in 2027.
MT 881 Ka-501 CR	AFV Armoured fighting vehicle	KNDS Boxer - tracked Mk.1	GTK Boxer	1,200 PS (880 kW)	Germany	Existing prototype, offered for export.
MT 883 Ka-500	APC Armoured personnel carrier	Namer - modernised	Merkava Mk.4	1,500 hp (1,100 kW)	Israel	Used with the latest generation of the Namer, using the same powerpack as the Merkava Mk IV.
MT 883 Ka-524	AAV Amphibious assault vehicle	Expeditionary Fighting Vehicle	EFV	2,740 PS (2,020 kW)	United States	Programme cancelled, prototypes only.
6R106 TD21	ATV Articulated tracked vehicles	Bronco-3	Bronco ATTC	326 PS (240 kW)	Singapore	Presented in 2017.
6V183 TC22	AFV Armoured fighting vehicle	M113 G3	M113	300 hp (220 kW)	United States Germany	Modernised by FFG for the German Army and the Danish Army, entering service in early 2000s.
8V183 TE22	IFV and command vehicle Infantry fighting vehicle	Pizarro I	ASCOD	600 hp (450 kW)	Spain	Used for the first batch of Pizarro of the Spanish Army, ordered in 1996, entered service in 2002.
8V183 TE22	IFV Infantry fighting vehicle	Mowag Trojan	Mowag Trojan	600 PS (440 kW)	Switzerland	Prototype only, developed in the 1990s.
8V183 TE22	IFV Infantry fighting vehicle	Patria TC-200 / TC-500	Mowag Trojan	600 PS (440 kW)	Switzerland Finland	Prototype only, developed in the 1990s.
6V199 TE20	AFV (multi-role) Armoured fighting vehicle	M113AS4 AF (APC) M113AS4 ALV (logistics) M113AS4 AF (armoured fitters) M125AS3 AM (mortar carrier) M806AS3 ARVL (ARV)	M113	350 hp (260 kW)	United States Australia	Project 106 modernisation of M113 and derivatives in Australian service.
6V199 TE20	AFV (multi-role) Armoured fighting vehicle	M577 AS3 ACV (C2) M577 AS3 AA (ambulance) NM196 NM198	M577	350 hp (260 kW)	United States Australia Germany Norway	Used by Germany, Norway and Australia.
6V199 TE20 FFG G4 Powerpack	AFV Armoured fighting vehicle	LPG Lekkie Podwozie Gąsienicowe (Light Tracked Chassis)	2S1 Goździk	350 hp (260 kW)	Poland	Prototype dating from 2009.
6V199 TE21	AFV Armoured fighting vehicle	FFG PMMC G5	PMMC G5	585 PS (430 kW)	Germany	Entered service in 2022 with Norway, to enter service with the Netherlands.
6V890	AFV Armoured fighting vehicle	Future Combat System	FCS	750 PS (550 kW)	United States	Future Combat System, two engines ordered by the US Army in 2003 for the prototypes.
8V199 TE20	IFV Infantry fighting vehicle	Borsuk	Borsuk	720 PS (530 kW)	Poland	Ordered by the Polish Army.
8V199 TE20	IFV Infantry fighting vehicle	Pizarro II / ULAN	ASCOD	720 PS (530 kW)	Austria Spain	Used from the beginning by Austria, and for the second batch by Spain (117 ordered in 2003).
8V199 TE20	Command vehicle	Sabrah UT-30	ASCOD 2	720 PS (530 kW)	Israel Spain	In service since 2023 with the Philippines.
8V199 TE20	AFV Armoured fighting vehicle	ST Hunter	ST Hunter	720 PS (530 kW)	Singapore	Entered service in 2019.
8V199 TE21	IFV Infantry fighting vehicle	ASCOD 2	ASCOD 2	820 PS (600 kW)	Spain	Ordered by the Latvian Army.
8V199 TE21	AFV Armoured fighting vehicle	GD Ajax family	ASCOD 2	820 PS (600 kW)	United Kingdom Spain	Variants Ajax, Ares, Athena, Argus, Atlas, a multi-role use, with following roles: IFV, reconnaissance, command and control, APC, engineering, recovery, repair.
8V199 TE21	IFV Infantry fighting vehicle	GD Griffin III	ASCOD 2	820 PS (600 kW)	United States United Kingdom Spain	XM30 Mechanized Infantry Combat Vehicle programme competitor of the US Army.
8V199 TE21	IFV Infantry fighting vehicle	Hunter	ASCOD 2	820 PS (600 kW)	Latvia Spain	
8V199 TE21	AFV Armoured fighting vehicle	VAC Vehículo de Apoyo de Cadenas	ASCOD 2	820 PS (600 kW)	Spain	
10V890	IFV Infantry fighting vehicle	Puma	Puma	1,088 PS (800 kW)	Germany	German use since 2015.

=== Engines for wheeled armoured vehicles ===
Engine	Vehicle type	Vehicle	Vehicle based on (chassis)	Power	Origin	Notes
4R106 TD20	RECCE	Panhard ERC	Panhard ERC	170 PS (130 kW)	France	Modernisation with new engine in 2005.
4R106 TD21	Patrol vehicle	RG-34 Iguana	RG-34 Iguana	220 PS (160 kW)	South Africa	In service since 2009.
6R106 TD20	Patrol vehicle	NIMR Tigr	Tigr	280 PS (210 kW)	UAE Russia	Engine for the UAE variant only.
6R106 TD20	Patrol vehicle	Tactica	Tactica	255 PS (188 kW)	United Kingdom	Vehicle unveiled in 2003.
6R106 TD21	Light amphibious reconnaissance vehicle	AMZ Bóbr-3 LOTR (Light Armoured Reconnaissance Transporter)	AMZ Bóbr-3	326 PS (240 kW)	Poland	
6R106 TD21	Infantry mobility vehicle	AMZ Tur V	AMZ Tur	326 PS (240 kW)	Poland	
6R106 TD21	Infantry mobility vehicle	AMZ Tur VI	AMZ Tur	326 PS (240 kW)	Poland	
6R106 TD21	AFV Armoured fighting vehicle	BTR-3E / BTR-3E1	BTR-3	326 PS (240 kW)	Ukraine	Used from 2012 in Thailand.
6R106 TD21	Infantry mobility vehicle	Perun ST	Perun ST	326 PS (240 kW)	Czech Republic	Prototype dating from 2017.
6R-1000	Patrol vehicle	Despot	Despot	310 to 350 PS (230 to 260 kW)	Bosnia	Used by Ethiopia and the Serbian police.
6V183 TE22	AFV Armoured fighting vehicle	Piranha 3H	Piranha 3	400 hp (300 kW)	Switzerland	Used by Ireland and Denmark, dating from the early 2000s.
6V183 TE22	AFV Armoured fighting vehicle	Piranha 3C	Piranha 3	400 hp (300 kW)	Switzerland	Used by the Belgian Land Componant and the Spanish Marine Corps, delivered in the 2000-2010s.
6V199 TE21	AFV Armoured fighting vehicle	Piranha V	Piranha V	585 PS (430 kW)	Switzerland Denmark Romania	Used by Denmark and Romania. It exists in the following roles:IFV, APC, command post, CBRN reconnaissance vehicle, ambulance, mortar carrier, recovery and repair vehicle, sapper vehicle, SPAAG.
6V199 TE20	AFV Armoured fighting vehicle	TPz Fuchs 1A9	TPz Fuchs	456 hp (340 kW)	Germany	Presented in 2023.
6V199 TE20	AFV Armoured fighting vehicle	TPz Fuchs 2	TPz Fuchs	456 hp (340 kW)	Germany	Presented in 2005.
6V890	AFV Armoured fighting vehicle	Eitan AFV	Eitan AFV	750 PS (550 kW)	Israel	For the initial production.
8V199 TE20	AFV Armoured fighting vehicle	GTK Boxer A1, A2, A2/A3 hybrid	GTK Boxer	720 PS (530 kW)	Germany Netherlands Australia	
8V199 TE21	AFV Armoured fighting vehicle	GTK Boxer A3	GTK Boxer	820 PS (600 kW)	Germany Netherlands United Kingdom	
8V199 TE21	AFV Armoured fighting vehicle	Eitan AFV	Eitan AFV	820 PS (600 kW)	Israel	Updated engine in 2025.

=== Engines for engineering vehicles based on tracked and wheeled armoured fighting vehicles ===
Engine	Vehicle type	Vehicle	Vehicle based on (chassis)	Power	Origin	Notes
6R106 TD20	MCV Mine clearing vehice	Husky VMMD	Husky VMMD	205 PS (151 kW)	South Africa	Systems dating from the 1970s.
6V199 TE20	Sapper vehicle	Piranha IV 8×8 - "Pionier Panzerfahrzeug 21"	Piranha IV	544 hp (406 kW)	Switzerland	To enter service by 2025.
6V199 TE21	ARV Armoured recovery vehicle	PMMC G5 ARV	PMMC G5	585 PS (430 kW)	Germany	To enter service in 2025 in the Norwegian Army.
8V199 TE20	Sapper vehicle	Pizarro Castor VCZ	ASCOD 2	721 PS (530 kW)	Spain Austria	

=== Air-defence vehicles ===
Engine	Vehicle type	Vehicle	Vehicle based on (chassis)	Power	Origin	Notes
Self-propelled anti-aircraft missile launcher
MB 833 Ea-500	SPPAW Self-propelled anti-aircraft weapon	AMX-30R Roland missile	AMX-30	600 PS (440 kW)	France	Spanish variant
6V199 TE21	SPPAW Self-propelled anti-aircraft weapon	Kongsberg NOMADS	PMMC G5	585 PS (430 kW)	Germany Norway	To be used by the Netherlands Army and the Norwegian Army.
8V199 TE21	SPPAW Self-propelled anti-aircraft weapon	LVS NNbS - IRIS-T SLS	Boxer A3	820 PS (600 kW)	Switzerland Germany	To be used by the German Army.
Self-propelled anti-aircraft gun
MB 833 Ka-500	SPPAG Self-propelled anti-aircraft gun	TH-325 Dragon	TH-301	800 hp (600 kW)	Germany	Prototype only, didn't enter service.
MB 837 Ba-500	SPPAG Self-propelled anti-aircraft gun	Fliegerabwehrpanzer 68 35 mm Flab Panzer B22L	Panzer 61	660 hp (490 kW)	Switzerland	Prototype only, didn't enter service.
MB 838 CaM 500	SPPAG Self-propelled anti-aircraft gun	Flakpanzer Gepard	Leopard 1	830 PS (610 kW)	Germany	Entered service in 1976.
MB 838 CaM 500	SPPAG Self-propelled anti-aircraft gun	Otomatic OTO main anti-aircraft tank for intercept and combat	OF-40	750 hp (560 kW)	Italy	Prototype only, didn't enter service.
MB 873 Ka-501	SPPAG Self-propelled anti-aircraft gun	Marksman	Leopard 2	1,500 hp (1,100 kW)	United Kingdom Germany	Used by Finland.
6V199 TE21	SPPAG Self-propelled anti-aircraft gun	Skyranger 30	PMMC G5	585 PS (430 kW)	Germany Switzerland	To be used by the Netherlands Army.
6V199 TE21	SPPAG Self-propelled anti-aircraft gun	Skyranger 30	Piranha V	585 PS (430 kW)	Switzerland Denmark	To be used by the Danish Army.
8V199 TE21	SPPAG Self-propelled anti-aircraft gun	Skyranger 30 / Skyranger 35	Boxer A3	820 PS (600 kW)	Switzerland Germany	To be used by the German Army.
8V199 TE23	SPPAG Self-propelled anti-aircraft gun	FFG Condor	Leopard 1	1,070 hp (800 kW)	Germany Slovakia	Proposal made by FFG.

=== Specialised vehicles ===
Engine	Vehicle type	Vehicle	Vehicle based on (chassis)	Power	Origin	Notes
6V199 TE21	Radio relay armoured vehicle	Piranha V StratCom "Richtfunkpanzer"	Piranha V	585 PS (430 kW)	Switzerland Germany	TaWAN German Army programme.

=== Military trucks ===
Engine	Vehicle type	Vehicle	Vehicle based on (chassis)	Power	Origin	Notes
6R106 TD21	Tactical truck	Jelcz 442.32	Jelcz 442.32	326 PS (240 kW)	Poland	Dating from 2017.
12V183TD224	Tactical truck	Tatra 816-6VWN9T 43 610 8×8.1R	Tatra 816	830 PS (610 kW)	Czech Republic	
