= Renk =

German company

Renk Group AG
- Type: Public
- Traded as: FWB: R3NK; SDAX
- Industry: Mechanical engineering
- Founded: 1873; 153 years ago
- Founder: Johann Julius Renk
- Headquarters: Augsburg, Bavaria, Germany
- Key people: Alexander Sagel (CEO), Anja Mänz-Siebje (CFO), Emmerich Schiller (COO), Klaus Richter (Chairman of the Supervisory Board)
- Revenue: €1.1 billion (2024)
- Number of employees: 3,400 (2024)
- Website: renk.com

The Renk Group AG is a German global manufacturer of transmissions, engines, hybrid drive systems, vehicle suspension systems, plain bearings, couplings, and testing systems. The company builds special gearboxes for tanks, frigates, icebreakers, and industry and is a leading supplier of running gear and damping systems for tracked and wheeled military vehicles. Renk is headquartered in Augsburg and in addition to its headquarters, also manufactures in Rheine, Hannover, Winterthur, Bath, and Sterling Heights.

In 2022, the group achieved a turnover of €850 million and employed 3,000 people. About 70% of its turnover was generated by tank and marine gear units. Founded in 1873, the company has been either fully owned or majority-owned by private equity investor Triton since 2020. Renk returned to the Frankfurt Stock Exchange following an initial public offering in 2024.

== History ==
=== 19th century ===
The company traces back to Johann Julius Renk (4 January 1848 – 3 November 1896). He completed an apprenticeship as a locksmith and lathe operator at Maschinenfabrik Augsburg, later MAN Group, and began working as a journeyman lathe operator at Maschinenfabrik L. A. Riedinger. During this time, Renk had the idea of a machine that could produce gears completely mechanically. The usual production process at that time consisted of two individual steps, the mechanical slitting of the wheel bodies and the manual filing of the finished gears using templates. In May 1873, Renk set up his own small workshop for the mechanical production of gears in Augsburg's Lechviertel district.

First, he developed a semi-automatic spur gear planing machine that worked using templates. Barely four years after founding his workshop, he also designed and built a machine tool that could produce conical wheels, today known as bevel gears. For this invention, which caused a great stir among experts at the time, Renk was awarded the patent DRP 8000/79 in 1879 (production of the first involute gearing with a pressure angle of 14.5 degrees). In the same year, the company moved to the Göggingen district of Augsburg and established Renk's headquarters there, which still exist as of 2023. In 1888, Renk owned 15 self-built gear planing machines, among other machine tools. His workforce consisted of 37 employees. Two years later, the entrepreneur founded a factory health insurance fund for his workforce.

When Renk died in November 1896, his company employed over 100 workers who produced about 12,000 gears of all kinds every year. The turnover was around DM500,000. After the founder's death, his company was converted into a joint-stock company with the name Zahnräderfabrik Augsburg vorm. Joh. Renk Act. Ges. on 11 March 1897. The newly founded company acquired the company, including land, equipment and machinery, from Renk's heirs at a price of DM666,391.51. In the corporation's first fiscal year, the workforce consisted of 130 employees.

=== 20th century ===
In the years after the turn of the century, the company expanded production so that by 1913 around 700 people were employed. The company changed its name to Zahnräderfabrik Augsburg AG in the same year. In order to mitigate the consequences of the First World War and ensure the company's continued existence, it was incorporated into the mechanical engineering group Gutehoffnungshütte (GHH) from Oberhausen, which later became MAN, in 1923. Also that year, the company became publicly listed on the Frankfurt Stock Exchange. In the following years, Renk thus was able to benefit from clients within the group as well as from favourable sources of fuel, pig iron and steel. From 1926, ground gears were produced in Augsburg.

In the years before and during the Second World War, the company was a major supplier for the German Wehrmacht. Forced labourers were used on a large scale during the Second World War. In August 1942, 180 men and 30 women from the territories of the Soviet Union alone were forced labourers at Renk. In 1944, around 2,000 forced labourers for the Messerschmitt, Renk and Alpine companies were housed in the Sammellager V in Augsburg.

Among the most important customers after the Second World War were steel processing companies, such as the Group's sister company Schloemann, to which multiple large rolling mill gearboxes were supplied. By the end of the 1950s, sales had increased to around DM50 million and Renk employed over 1,400 workers. In the following decades, the company expanded its product range by acquiring rival companies. These acquisitions included the takeover of Eisenwerk Wülfel in Hannover in 1975 and the Tacke GmbH in Rheine in 1986. The French companies Société Européenne d'Engrenages (SEE) and Société d'Equipements, Systèmes et Mécanismes (SESM) joined Renk in 1989. Thus, the company expanded into the areas of plain bearings and flexible couplings through Wülfel, crown gear couplings and certain marine gears through Tacke, small marine reversing gears and brake discs through SEE as well as armoured gear units through SESM.

The company was renamed to Renk Aktiengesellschaft (Renk AG) in 1987. In 1995, the merger of Renk Tacke GmbH with Renk AG was finally completed. In 1998, Renk was represented at three German locations in Augsburg, Hanover and Rheine, as well as four locations abroad, two of which were in France and one each in the US and Romania. At that time, the group employed 1,700 people, who achieved a turnover of around DM500 million.

=== 21st century ===
In 2000, the Renk Corporation Labeco Division was formed when Renk Corporation, a division of the German Renk AG, purchased the test systems engineering business of the US Laboratory Equipment Corporation (Labeco). At the same time, the product division Plain Bearings of A. Friedr. Flender AG joined the company. On 1 April 2004, the Test Systems business unit became legally independent and was spun off into Renk Test System GmbH.

In 2007, the company made the headlines due to a bribery affair. A court of appeal in Paris issued suspended sentences against Renk board spokesman Manfred Hirt and his former deputy Norbert Schulze. Renk-Maag GmbH was also founded in the same year. Renk-Maag GmbH emerged in May from Winterthur-based Maag-Gear, which manufactured turbo gearboxes and spare parts as well as synchronization, manual, and gear clutches.

As of 2011, Renk AG was a member of the Volkswagen Group due to the majority takeover of MAN by Volkswagen AG. Volkswagen held 76% of the company's shares.

Renk Shanghai Service and Commercial Ltd. Co. was founded in 2012, which also resulted in the opening of a Renk service centre in Shanghai. In 2017, Renk AG acquired the Dutch company Damen Schelde Gears B.V., a manufacturer of marine gear units. In the same year, the subsidiaries Renk Gears Private Ltd. in India and Renk Korea Co. Ltd. in South Korea were founded. Further expansion followed with the acquisitions of Horstman Holdings Limited in the UK in 2019, the Combat Propulsion Systems division of defence contractor L3Harris Technologies in the US and General Kinetics in Canada, a specialist in suspension and running gear and supplier of mobility systems for wheeled and tracked armoured vehicles.

At the end of 2018, Renk AG was demerged from MAN SE into Volkswagen Vermögensverwaltungs GmbH.

In December 2020, the annual general meeting of Renk AG resolved to transfer the shares of its minority shareholders in return for cash compensation as part of a merger with Rebecca BidCo AG, a portfolio company of Triton Fund V, and subsequently to convert the AG into Renk GmbH. In the subsequent appraisal proceedings before the Munich Regional Court, a total of 75 claimants objected to the amount of the cash compensation determined. The proceedings were ended by a settlement. Renk was delisted from the stock exchange in February 2021.

In February 2024, Renk completed an initial public offering raising €500 million and was relisted on the Frankfurt Stock Exchange, following which Triton continued to be a majority owner. KMW+Nexter Defense Systems became a minority owner, assuming nearly a 7% stake, while Wellington Management Company was another anchor investor.

== Corporate structure ==
Renk Holding GmbH is the parent company of the Renk Group. It holds an indirect interest in the operationally active Renk companies through its direct wholly owned shareholding in Renk FinCo GmbH. Renk is a wholly owned subsidiary of the private equity group Triton. The group achieved a turnover of €926 million in the year 2023 and employed about 3,400 people in 2024. According to reports from 2022 and 2023, Renk generates about 70% of its turnover with tanks and marine gear units. The group is divided into four independent strategic business units: Special Gear Units (Industrial and Marine), Vehicle Transmissions, Standard Gear Units and Plain Bearings.

=== Board of directors ===
Since May 2021, the board of directors at Renk GmbH has consisted of the following persons: Claus von Hermann (chairman of the supervisory board), Horst Ott (employee representative), Swantje Conrad, Sascha Dudzik (employee representative), Cécile Duthell, Lothar Evers (employee representative), Johannes Meier, Adela Lieb (employee representative), Klaus Refle (employee representative), Mario Sommer (employee representative), Klaus Stahlmann and Rainer Martens.

=== Employee representation ===
The Renk Group has works councils at its Augsburg, Rheine, and Hanover sites. The representatives of the work councils include six members of the supervisory board.

=== Locations and branches ===
The Renk Group has manufacturing plants in Augsburg (vehicle, industrial and marine transmissions, test systems), Rheine (industrial and marine transmissions, couplings), Hanover (plain bearings, couplings), Starnberg (Renk Magnet-Motor), Bath in England, Saint-Ouen-l'Aumône in France (vehicle transmissions), Winterthur in Switzerland, Muskegon and Sterling Heights in the US and Canada, as well as a sales and design office in Sonthofen in the Allgäu region. In addition, Renk has its own representatives in over 100 countries.

=== Subsidiaries ===
The Group has the following subsidiaries:

- Renk GmbH, Augsburg, Germany
- Renk FinCo GmbH, Augsburg, Germany
- Renk GmbH Rheine plant, Rheine, Germany
- Renk Bearings GmbH, Hanover, Germany
- Renk Magnet-Motor GmbH, Starnberg, Germany
- Renk Test System GmbH, Augsburg, Germany
- Renk America LLC, Muskegon (MI), US (Note: Renk America LLC was formed in 2021 from the Combat Propulsion Systems business acquired from L3Harris Technologies.)
- Renk Holdings Inc., Muskegon (MI), US (Note: In the course of establishing Renk America LLC, Renk Holdings Inc. was founded to bundle all US activities.)
- Renk America Marine & Industry LLC, Cincinnati (OH), US
- Renk Corporation, Duncan (SC), US
- Renk France S.A.S., Saint-Ouen-l'Aumône, France
- Renk-Maag GmbH, Winterthur, Switzerland
- Renk Systems Corporation, Camby (IN), US
- Horstman Holdings Ltd., Bath, UK.
- Horstman Defence Systems Limited, Bath, UK
- Horstman Inc., Sterling Heights (MI), US
- Horstmann Systems Inc., Woodbridge, Canada
- Horstman Canada Inc., Brampton, Canada (Note: Horstman Canada Inc. was formed in 2023 from the merger of the defence company General Kinetics with the existing centre of excellence in Canada.)
- Renk Holding Canada Inc., Toronto, Canada
- Renk Korea Co. Ltd., Busan, South Korea
- Renk Transmisyon Sanayi A.S., Istanbul, Türkiye
- RENK Benelux (formerly Schelde Gears B.V.), Vlissingen, Netherlands
- Modest Tree Media Inc., Halifax, Canada
- Renk (UK) Ltd., London, UK (inactiv)
- Cofical Renk Mancais do Brasil Ltd., Guaramirim, Brazil
- Renk Gears Pvt. Ltd., Shoolagiri, India
- Renk Shanghai Service and Commercial Co. Ltd., Shanghai, China
- Renk U.A.E. LLC, Abu Dhabi, UAE

== Products ==
=== Transmissions for tracked vehicles ===
List of all Renk transmissions for tracked vehicles:

- Main battle tanks
  - ATREX (for a confidential application)
  - ESM 350 (for the PT-91M, Polish variant of the T-72 for Malaysia)
  - ESM 500 (for the French Army variant of the Leclerc)
  - HMPT 500 (for the Bernardini MB-3 Tamoyo prototype)
  - HSWL 295 (for the Leclerc tropicalisé, the Emirati variant)
  - HSWL 295 TM (Challenger 2E, the 3 first batches of the K2 Black Panther, the prototype of the Altay and will be used with the Ariete C2)
  - HSWL 354 (for the Leopard 2, the derivatives of the Leopard 2, the KF-51 Panther)4,000 of these were produced as of June 2026.
  - HSWL354/2 (for the MBT-70 prototype)
  - LSG 3000 (for the Ariete and the K1, in collaboration with ZF Friedrichshafen)
  - RK 304 (Merkava Mark II, Merkava Mark 3 and the Ramses II (Egyptian T54))
  - RK 304S (for the Arjun and the M60T tank)
  - RK 325 (for the Merkava IV)
  - HSWL 406, a transmission in development for future MBT (50 - 70 tons)
- Medium tanks
  - HSWL 204 (for the Tanque Argentino Mediano and the TH-301)
- Light tanks
  - HSWL 106C (for the Sabrah light tank)
- Tank hunters
  - HSWL 123 (Jaguar 1, Jaguar 2, Kanonenjagdpanzer)
- Infantry fighting vehicles:
  - ESM 280
  - HMPT (for the K21, the Bradley)
  - HMPT-500EC (for the Bionix AFV)
  - HSWL 106 (for the ASCOD vehicle, ULAN and Pizarro / the Tulpar and the Mowag Trojan prototypes)
  - HSWL 194 (for the Marder)
  - HSWL 204 (for the TAM VCTP)
  - HSWL 256 (for the Ajax, ASCOD 2, Boxer (tracked), Puma and Lynx KF41)
  - HSWL 284C (for the Marder 2 prototype)
  - LSG 1500 (for the Dardo, in collaboration with ZF Friedrichshafen)
  - RK 304 (for the Namer)
- Multi-role armoured vehicles:
  - HMPT (for the AMPV)
  - HSWL 076 (for the Patria Trackx)
  - HSWL 096 (for the M113)
- Self-propelled Howitzer:
  - HMPT (for the M109A7)
  - HMPT-500EC (for the SSPH 1 Primus)
  - HSWL 106 (for the DONAR AGM)
  - HSWL 204 (for the VCA Palmaria)
  - HSWL 284 (for the SP70 prototype)
  - HSWL 284C (for the PzH2000)
  - LSG 2000 (for AS90, in collaboration with ZF Friedrichshafen)
- Multiple launch rocket system
  - HMPT (for the M270 MLRS)
  - HSWL 204 (for the TAM VCLC)
- Air defence vehicles
  - HSWL 194 (for the AMX30 R Roland)
- Engineering vehicles
  - HSWL 284 M (for the Keiler)

=== Transmissions for wheeled vehicles ===
- HCV106 (used for the Iklwa (Ratel 6×6))
- RECO606 (used for the Fennek and the Puma 4×4 and 6×6, and used as prototype for the ERC90 Sagaie modernised and the Aligator 4×4)

== Criticism ==
=== Controversial arms exports ===
In the past, there has been repeated criticism that arms manufactured by German companies are exported to crisis and conflict regions, contrary to legal regulations. In particular, exports to countries such as Saudi Arabia or Algeria have been criticized. Renk participates in such programmes, and a significant part of Renk's sales is generated by the production of gearboxes for tanks and warships. In reaction to the Russian invasion of Ukraine, the public view of exports of German military equipment to foreign countries changed. Since then, Renk, like other companies, has been attested to be a necessary manufacturer for the sector.

=== Bribery scandal ===
On 29 September 1993, Renk AG signed a contract with GIAT for the supply of transmissions for 436 Leclerc tanks. Turnover from this transaction amounted to approximately €100 million. The tanks were manufactured for the United Arab Emirates. To secure this contract, Renk board spokesman Manfred Hirt and his deputy Norbert Schulze paid bribes amounting to a total of 5.13 million German marks to Jean-Charles Marchiani and Yves Manuel. Marchiani was an advisor to the French Minister of the Interior, Charles Pasqua, during this period and later prefect of the Var department. A consultancy contract of 19 September 1993 with the company Irish Euro Agencies Ltd served as a cover for the money payment. The money was first paid into an account at the Westminster Bank in London and then channelled into two Swiss accounts.

Marchiani was sentenced to three years' imprisonment without probation and a fine of €150,000 for bribery. Yves Manuel received a three-year suspended sentence and a fine of €150,000 for complicity in bribery of a public official. The sentences imposed on Hirt and Schulze under French law were also upheld by the Paris Court of Appeals in March 2007. Both received 18-month suspended sentences and fines of €100,000 each. Manfred Hirt resigned from his position as Spokesman of the Board of the Renk AG and handed it over to Florian Hofbauer effective 31 August 2007, and left the board completely at the end of 2007.

== Literature ==
- Hohmann, Victor-Georg (1952). Augsburger Wirtschaftsalmanach (in German). Augsburg: Archiv-Verlag.
- Günther Grünsteudel, ed. (1998). Augsburger Stadtlexikon (in German) (2nd ed.). Perlach-Verlag. ISBN 978-3-9227-6928-6.
- Feyer, Sven (2018). Die MAN im Dritten Reich – Ein Maschinenbauunternehmen zwischen Weltwirtschaftskrise und Währungsreform (in German). Baden-Baden: Nomos Verlag. ISBN 978-3-8487-4338-4.
- Kučera, Wolfgang (1996). Fremdarbeiter und KZ-Häftlinge in der Augsburger Rüstungsindustrie (in German). AV Verlag. ISBN 978-3-9252-7428-2.
