= EuroPowerPack =

Tank engine and automatic transmission

The EuroPowerPack is the combination of the MTU MT883 Ka-500/501 diesel engine delivering over 1100 kW (1500 PS) shaft power with the ten-speed (five forward, five reverse) Renk HSWL 295TM automatic transmission for the use in heavy tracked vehicles like tanks.

Initially the version with the MT883 Ka-500 engine provided 1500 shaft horsepower, but in 2002 an improved version using the MT883 Ka-501 providing 1650hp was tested

== Engine specifications ==
- Engine: German MTU MT883 Ka-500/501 27-litre (27,361 cc, 1,670 cu in.) 90° V-block 12-cylinder liquid-cooled diesel engine
- Bore x stroke: 144 mm x 140 mm (5.669 inches X 5.512 inches)
- Aspiration: 2x single-stage turbocharged & air-to-liquid intercooled (charged-air cooler)
- Fuel system: Mechanical fuel line pump or Common rail (Ka-500)/Common rail (Ka-501)
- Coolant capacity: 110 L (29.05 gal)
- Lubrication: Dry sump
- Lubricant capacity: 80 L (21.13 gal)
- Engine length: 1,488 mm (58.583 inches)
- Engine width: 972 mm (38.268 inches)
- Engine height: 742 mm (29.213 inches)
- Dry weight (estimated): 1,800 kg (3,968 lbs)
- Power: 1,500 hp (Ka-500)/1,630 hp (Ka-501) @ 2,700 rpm Rated 1min
- Torque: 3,352 lb·ft (4545Nm)(Ka-500)/3,687 lb·ft (4999Nm)(Ka-501) @ 2,000 rpm

== Transmission specifications ==
- Transmission: German RENK HSWL 295TM - Ten Speed (Five Forward, Five Reverse)
- Transmission length: 774 mm (30.472 inches)
- Transmission width: 1,660 mm (65.354 inches)
- Transmission height: 816 mm (32.126 inches)
- Dry weight: 2,400 kg (5,286 lbs)
- Maximum Power: 1,600 hp

== Uses ==
The EuroPowerPack is used in:

- Leclerc tropicalisé
- Challenger 2E (export version challenger 2E only, uses Ka500)
- Merkava Mk. 4
- Arjun: Uses the same engine as in EuroPowerPack but with a different semi-automatic Renk RK 304-I transmission
- K2 Black Panther: Euro power packs (MT883 Ka-501) were used in 100 tanks produced for the first batch.
