= AMZ Bóbr-3 =

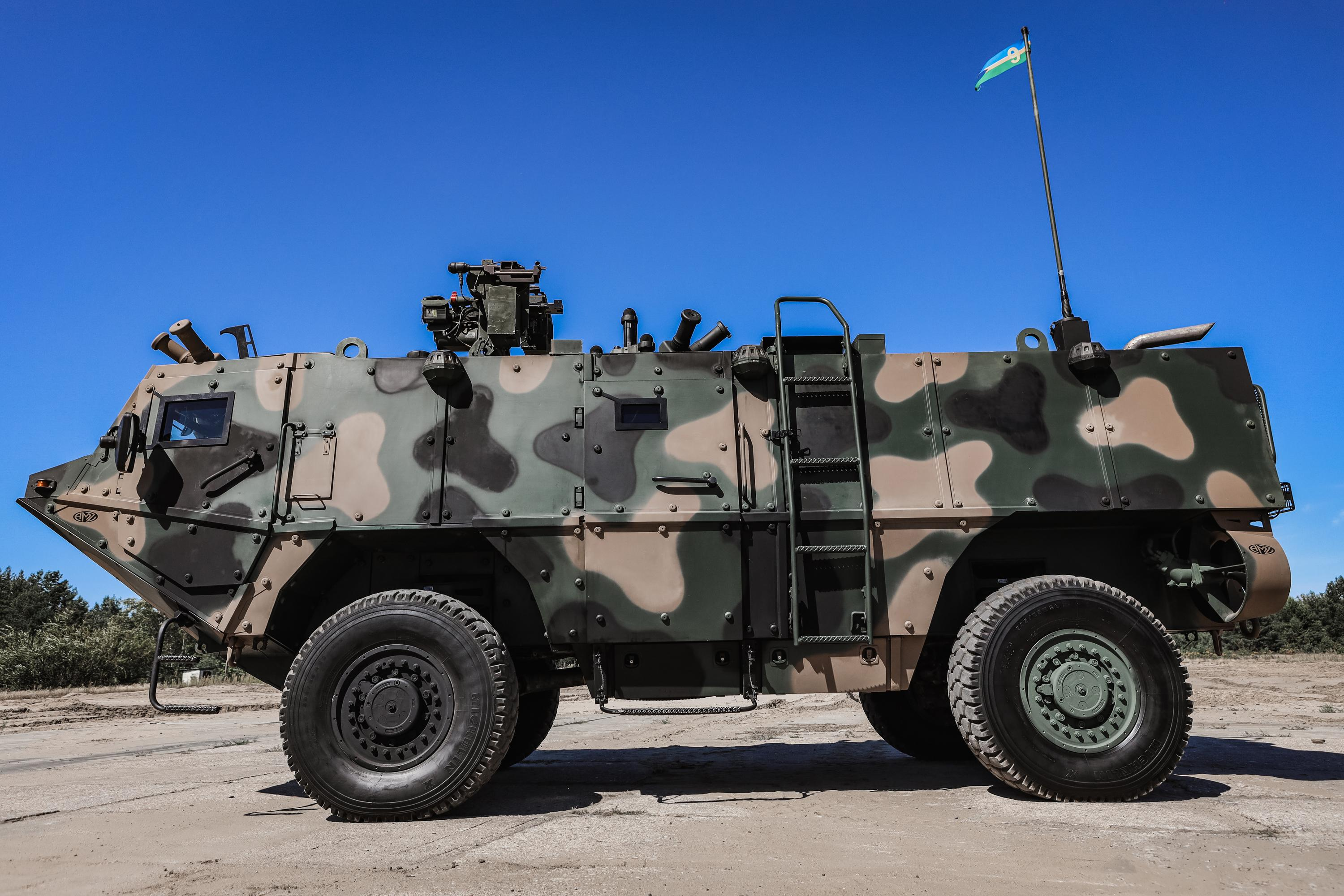
- Type: Amphibious armoured reconnaissance vehicle
- Place of origin: Poland

Service history
- Used by: See Operators

Production history
- Manufacturer: AMZ-Kutno
- Produced: 2019–

Specifications
- Mass: 15,550 kilograms (17.14 short tons; 15.30 long tons)
- Length: 7.62 m (25 ft 0 in)
- Width: 2.55 m (8 ft 4 in)
- Height: 3.13 m (10 ft 3 in)
- Crew: 5
- Armor: Level 2 according to STANAG 4569, can be increased to level 3
- Main armament: 12.7 mm wkm NSWT machine gun
- Secondary armament: 7.62 mm km UKM-2000 machine gun
- Engine: Diesel engine 321 hp (240 kW)
- Transmission: Automatic gearbox
- Suspension: Wheeled 4x4
- Ground clearance: 400 mm (16 in)
- Operational range: 600 km (370 mi)
- Maximum speed: 90 km/h (56 mph) (road); 40 km/h (25 mph) (off-road)

The AMZ Bóbr-3 (Polish: Bóbr, lit. 'Beaver') is a Polish wheeled amphibious armoured reconnaissance vehicle. This vehicle is part of a larger effort to replace the aging BRDM-2 armoured reconnaissance vehicles with more advanced platforms under the new Lekkiego Opancerzonego Transportera Rozpoznawczego (LOTR) 'Light Armoured Reconnaissance Transporter' program code-named Kleszcz (Tick).

== Development ==
Developed under the "Light Armored Reconnaissance Transporter" project, co-financed by the Polish National Centre for Research and Development (NCBR) from December 2013 to 2022, the Bóbr-3 represents a significant advancement in military technology. The project, which had a total cost of PLN 36.45 million, including NCBR co-financing of PLN 33.42 million (€7.76 million), was executed by a consortium led by the Polish Company AMZ-Kutno SA in collaboration with key military research institutes (Military Institute of Chemistry and Radiometry, Military Institute of Communications and Military Institute of Armament Technology).

On August 14, 2024, the Polish Armaments Agency (AA), acting on behalf of the State Treasury, announced a contract with AMZ-Kutno for the production of 28 LOTR 4x4 light armored reconnaissance vehicles. This agreement, valued at PLN 800 million (US$206 million), includes a logistics and training package, with deliveries expected between 2026 and 2028. The deal is part of a broader framework agreement signed in February 2024 that includes procuring 286 LOTR vehicles through 2035.

== Description ==
The LOTR is an amphibious, two-axle, off-road vehicle that handles challenging terrain and water obstacles. It features an all-wheel-drive system with a 4x4 configuration, offering excellent mobility in difficult environments. The vehicle can transport five reconnaissance soldiers and their equipment, making it ideal for patrol reconnaissance missions, providing on-board weapon fire support, and combating low-flying air targets.

=== Specifications ===
Sources:

- Weight: 15,550 kg
- Length: 7.62 m
- Height: 3.13 m
- Width: 2.55 m
- Wheelbase: 3.45 m
- Armour: in its basic version provides ballistic protection at level 2 according to STANAG 4569, and in terms of mine resistance at level 2a. Optional additional armour increases ballistic protection to level 3 and mine protection to level 3a.
- Crew: 5
- Engine: 321 hp (240 kW) diesel engine with an automatic gearbox in the power-pack system. Replacing the power-pack takes about an hour.
- Top speed: 90 km/h on paved roads, 40 km/h off-road
- Maximum range: 600 km on paved roads, 300 km off-road
- Approach angle: up to 40°
- Departure angle: up to 84°
- Maximum lateral tilt: 17°
- Wading depth: 1.5 m
- Armament: 12.7 mm wkm NSWT machine gun and a 7.62 mm km UKM-2000 machine gun, providing substantial firepower for reconnaissance and defensive operations.
- Additional: The Bóbr-3 has the option of installing a Remotely Controlled Weapon Module (RCWM), a laser warning system and a smoke grenade launcher.

The vehicle in its standard configuration is additionally equipped with an automatic fire protection system, a central inflation system for all wheels, which have run-flat inserts (enabling movement with shot or punctured tires), a power generator and an integrated heating and air conditioning system. Since the vehicle can overcome water obstacles, both by wading and swimming, the vehicle is equipped with a breakwater that prevents flooding of the vehicle's front windows when overcoming water obstacles.

With its advanced design and capabilities, the Bóbr-3 is expected to significantly enhance the Polish Army's reconnaissance abilities, offering improved mobility, protection, and firepower for its units.

== Operators ==
- Poland
