= ASCOD 2 =

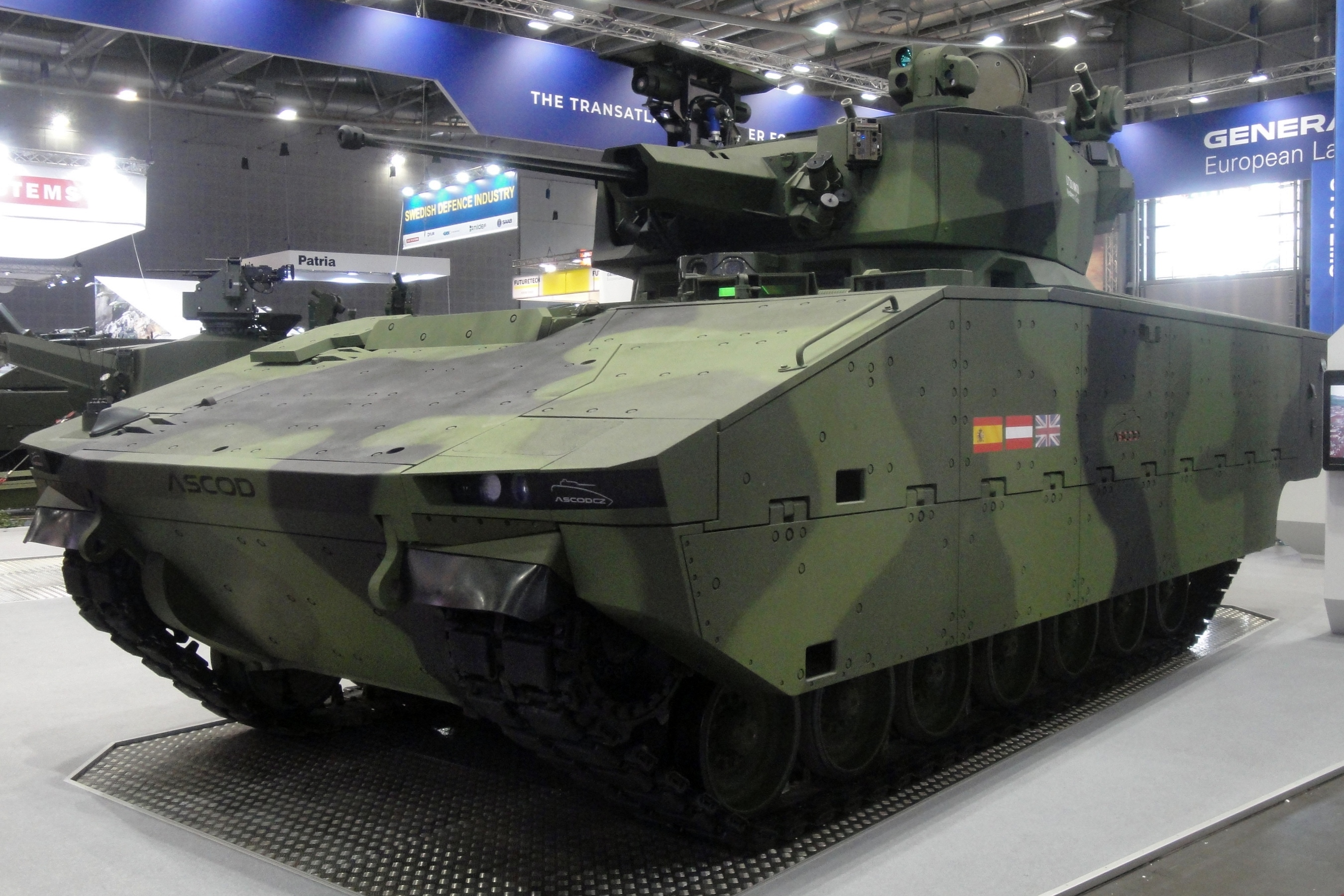
- ASCOD 2 IFV demonstrator in 2019
- Type: Armoured fighting vehicle
- Place of origin: Austria and Spain

Service history
- In service: 2023–present
- Used by: See Operators#

Production history
- Manufacturer: GDELS SBS
- Developed from: ASCOD
- Developed into: Sabrah light tank; GD Ajax; GD Griffin; M10 Booker; Vehículo de Apoyo de Cadenas
- Variants: See variants

Specifications
- Mass: Up to 45.0 tonnes (99,200 lb)
- Armor: Rolled steel armour options for ERA and composite armour
- Engine: MTU engines up to 1,100 PS (810 kW)
- Payload capacity: Up to 10.0 tonnes (22,000 lb)
- Suspension: Torsion bars and Piedrafita rotary dampers models AR01 and AR02.

The ASCOD 2 (Austrian Spanish Cooperation Development 2), also known as the ASCOD SV (Special Vehicle) is an evolution of the ASCOD armoured vehicle with an increased weight capacity, and a more evolutive platform.

When initiated, this programme was focused on creating export opportunities.

== History ==
An improved version of the ASCOD, called ASCOD 2, has been developed by General Dynamics and was presented in 2004.

When this variant was presented, it had the following characteristics:

- Engine: MTU 8V 199T21, 600 kilowatts (820 PS)
- Transmission: Renk HSWL 256 B
- Tracks: Diehl 1028
- Mass: 38.0 tonnes (83,800 lb) (growth capacity up to 42.0 tonnes (92,600 lb))

Over time, the capabilities of this variants were extended with the development of multiple sub-variants within the General Dynamics Land Systems group.

=== Early demonstrators ===
When the ASCOD 2 platform was released, GDELS presented several demonstrators to attract potential clients. These include:

- An infantry fighting vehicle with the SP-30 turret, the same one that was ordered and in use with Spain and Austria.
- An armoured personnel carrier with a lowered roof, and armed with a BAE Lemur RCWS.

In 2008, other demonstrators were shown:

- An up-armoured variant named PSO (peace support operations) was presented in 2008.
- The Donar, a 155mm self-propelled howitzer using the ASCOD 2 chassis as a base, and the Artillery Gun Module of KMW, that reuses most weapon systems of the PzH 2000, but automates it. This prototype was used for mobility testing and firing trials in Germany.

Although none of these demonstrators led directly to sales, it was the first step into a commercial success, with hundreds of vehicles sold, and thousands potential sales ongoing as of 2025.

== Variants ==
=== ASCOD Hunter ===
==== Selection ====
The Latvian Army operates the British CVR(T) which was purchased second hand (including the FV103, FV104 and FV107). The first were received in September 2015 with some minimal upgrades, and the rest of the vehicles were delivered from 2016 to early 2020.

Following the full-scale invasion of Ukraine in 2022, the Latvian authorities have been looking for a successor to the CVR(T) as it lacks some necessary technologies for the modern battlefield, and also as Latvia would like to support Ukraine with its existing armoured vehicles. The supply of the CVR(T) to Ukraine was confirmed in September 2024.

The vehicles that were presented to Latvia and tested by its army include the ASCOD 2, the CV90, the K21 and the Otokar Tulpar. In March 2024, following the testing phase, leaks coming from South Korea suggested that the K21 demonstrated the best performances, and that it would likely be selected by Latvia. In November 2024, the Latvian ministry of defence selected the ASCOD 2 for its future IFV.

A first contract for 42 vehicles was signed in January 2025 estimated at a value of €373 million (including a logistics support package). In June 2025, the Latvian parliament approved the purchase of a second batch of 42 additional vehicles.

==== Production ====
In January 2025, with the contract signature, it was announced that the first vehicle is planned to be delivered in 2026, while the following 41 left will be delivered in 2027.

In May 2025, Patria announced that the vehicle would be assembled by them locally under licence.

==== Design ====
With the signature of the first batch, more information regarding the parts selected for the IFV were unveiled. It includes:

- ASCOD 2 vehicle:
  - Transmission Renk HSWL256B
  - Rubber tracks (supplied by Soucy)
  - STANAG 4569 level 4 protection
  - Open electronic architecture
  - C4I system
- Elbit Systems UT30 Mk2, a remote turret (contract April 2025):
  - Mk44 Bushmaster II autocanon with a 30 mm caliber (30×173mm)
  - Iron Fist hard-kill active protection system
  - Option considered for an anti-tank guided missile, the Spike LR2 which is already integrated with the turret on the Romanian Piranha V IFV.

=== Spanish Army variants ===
The Spanish Army has purchased in multiple steps variants of the ASCOD and the ASCOD 2 variants.

==== ASCOD ====
- Phase 1, delivered from 1996 to 2002:
  - 123 VCI/C Fase I – infantry fighting vehicles
  - 21 VCPC – command and communications vehicles
- Phase 2, delivered from 2015 to 2017:
  - 2 prototypes of the VCI/C Fase II
  - 81 VCI/C Fase II

==== VCZ Castor ====
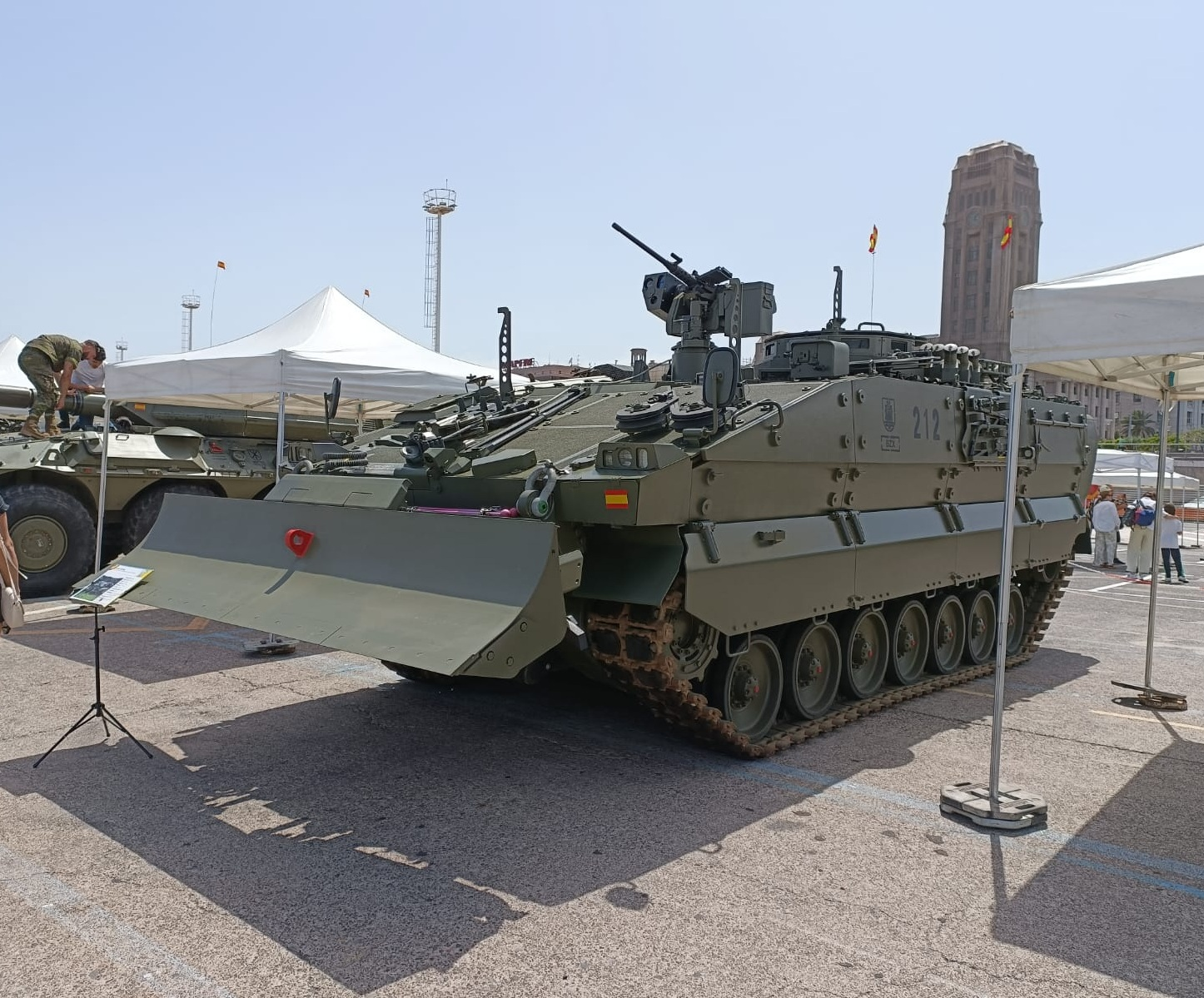
VCZ Castor

Still as part of the phase 2, the Spanish Army ordered armoured sapper vehicles to replace M113 vehicles with the same role:

- 1 prototype of the VCZAP Castor (Vehículo de Combate de ZAPadores Castor)
- 35 VCZAP Castor

Its role as a sapper or armoured engineering vehicle is to support mechanical troops advancement by filling trenches, by clearing obstacles, demining paths and assist in river crossings. For these missions, all the vehicles come with a bulldozer blade, but this one can be switched for a mine plough, a roller, a breach marking system and a mine-clearing hose launcher (MICLIC M-58).

This variant is equipped with the same engine as the ASCOD VCI/C Fase II, which is the MTU 8V199 TE20 that has a power of 721 PS (530 kW). This variant received the new local transmission, the SAPA SG850 which was initially planned for the VCI/C Fase II, but it wasn't ready back then. The vehicle can reach a weight of 35 t (77,000 lb) in mission, with up to 13 t (29,000 lb) of mission equipment.

In terms of armament, it received a Mini Samson RCWS M2 Browning equipped with a heavy machine gun for self defence.

The prototype of the VCZAP Castor was delivered at the end of 2018. The first six serial production vehicle was supplied in December 2023. The last delivery of the VCZAP Castor and the Phase II of the Spanish ASCOD programme took place in February 2025 with 9 vehicles.

==== VAC (Vehículo de Apoyo de Cadenas) ====
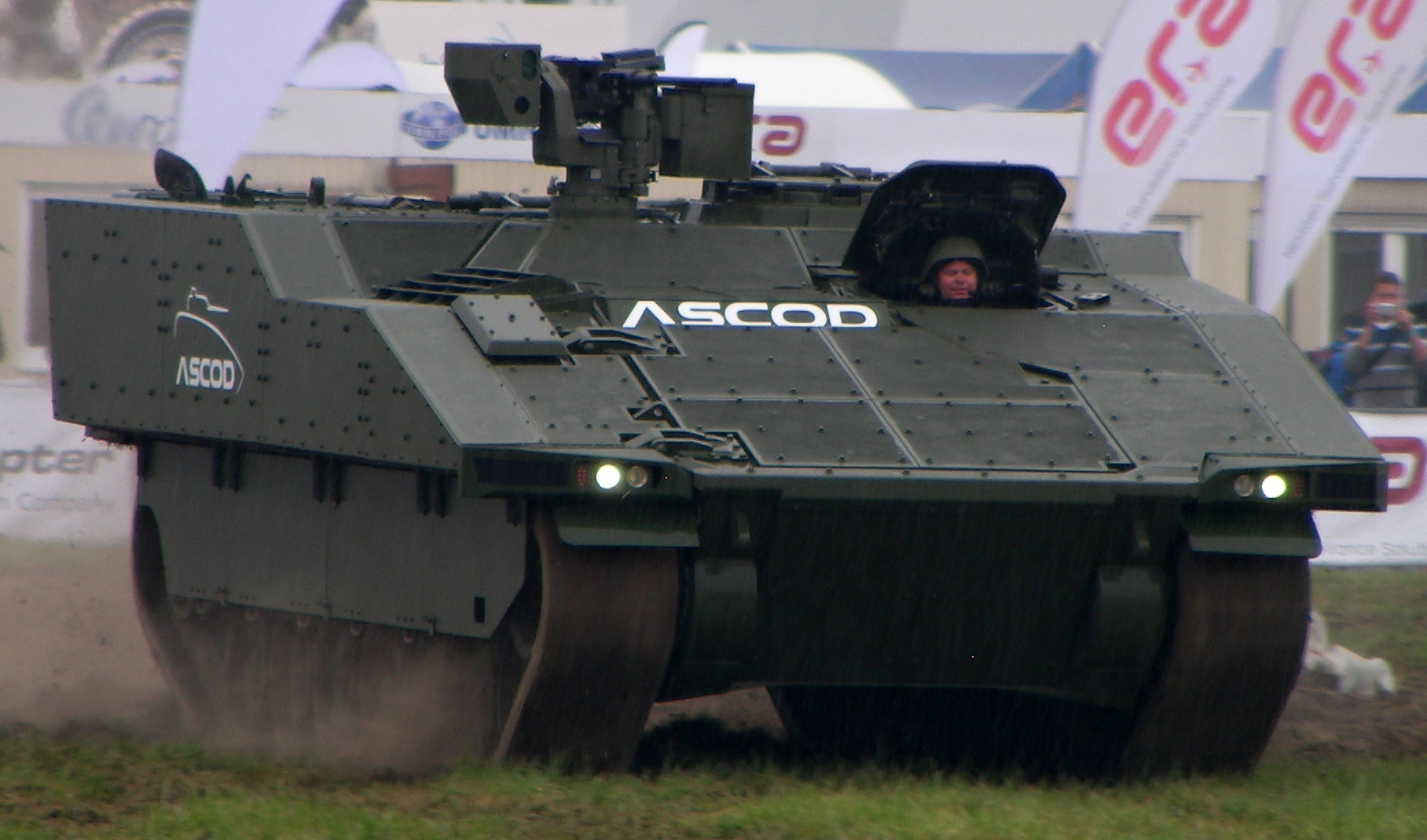
VAC prototype

The Spanish Army looked for a solution to replace its TOA M-113 (Transporte Oruga Acorazado, which means armoured tracked transport vehicles). The locally made ASCOD 2 platform was ideal. TESS Defence (JV including Indra, GDELS SBS, SAPA and Escribano) offered an ASCOD 2 with the same electronic architecture as the VEC Dragon (the Spanish Piranha V variant). This vehicle was named Vehículo de Apoyo de Cadenas.

In December 2023, the Spanish Army signed a contract for a first batch worth €2 billion for 394 vehicles.

The variants planned by the Spanish Army include:

- Combat support:
  - PP (portapersonal), an APC
  - DCC (defensa contracarro), an anti-tank defence vehicle
  - PC (puesto de mando), a command post vehicle
  - OAV (observador avanzado), a forward artillery observer vehicle
  - PM (mortera pesado de 120 mm), a 120 mm mortar carrier (potentially the ASCOD equipped with the Escribano GMOS mortar turret)
  - Sapper (VCZ Castor)
- Logistics:
  - AMB (ambulancia), an armoured ambulance
  - REC (recuperación), an armoured recovery vehicle
  - CPU (carga pick-up), a pick-up transport vehicle
  - CB (carga blindada), an armoured cargo transport vehicle

=== Prototypes ===
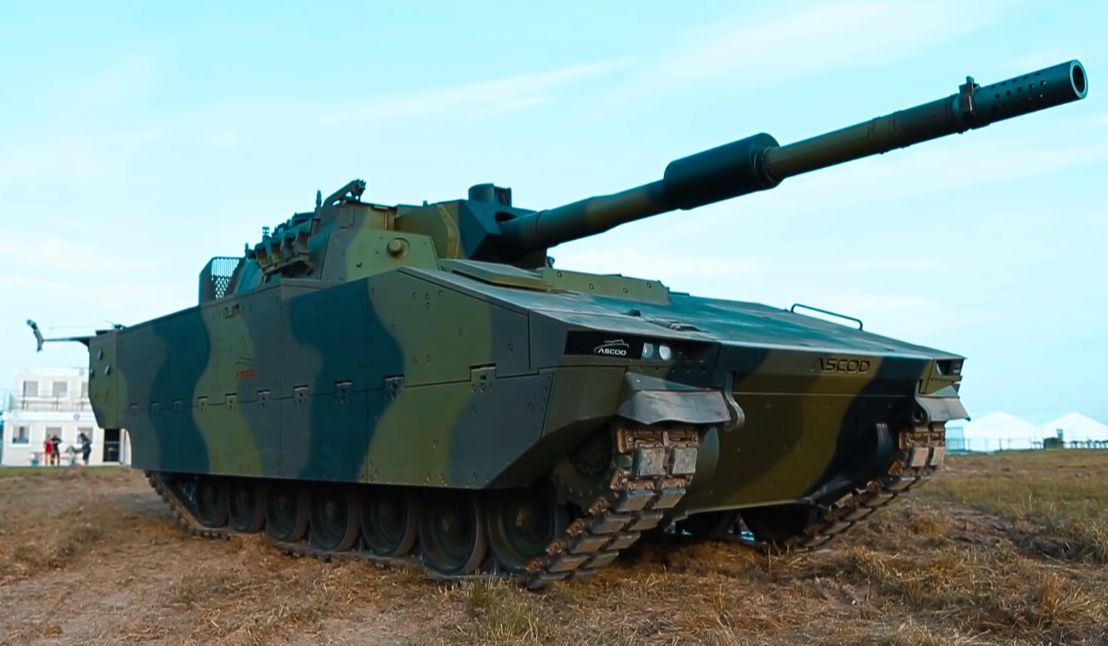
ASCOD 2 MMBT

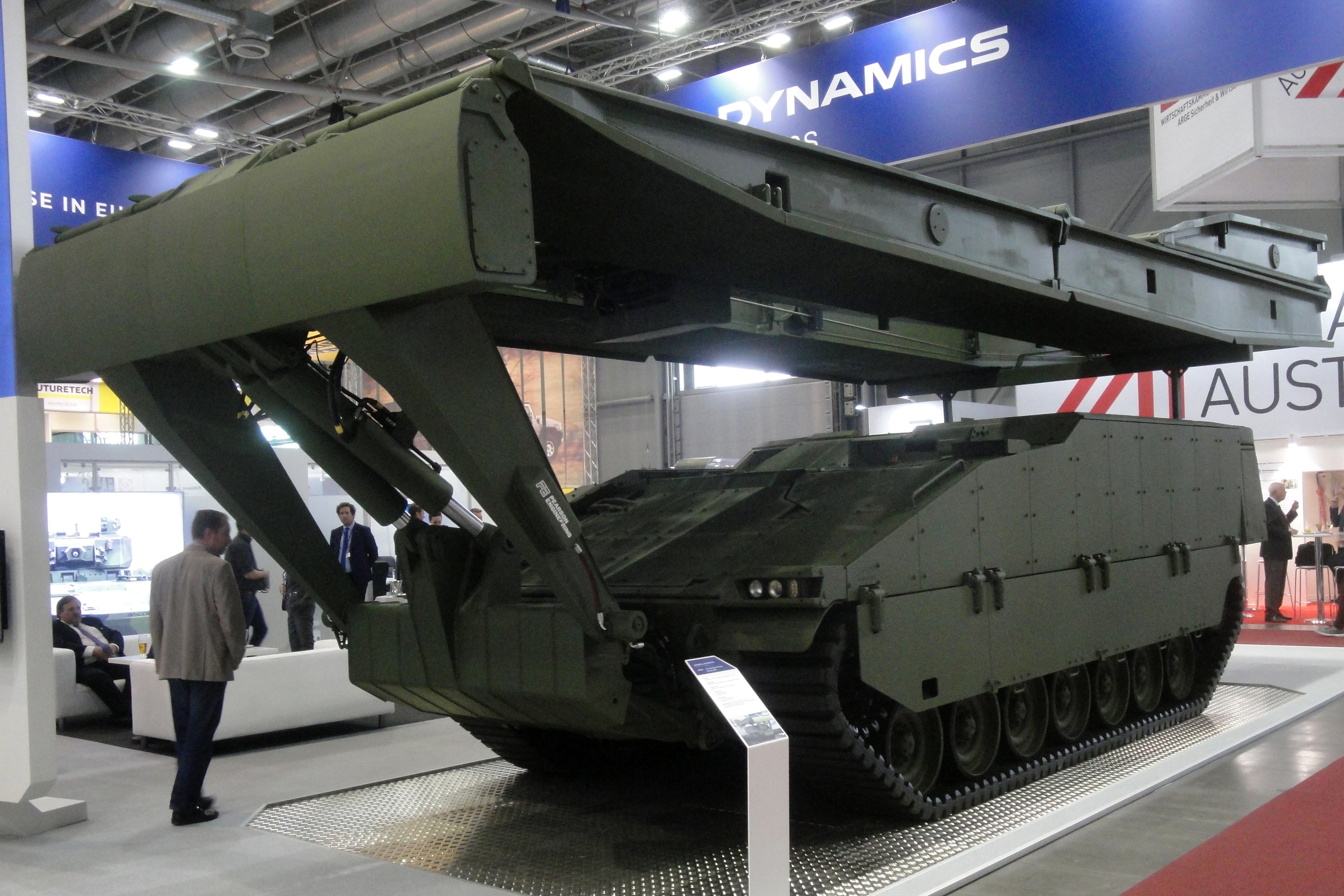
ASCOD 2 Cobra

==== ASCOD 2 MMBT (medium main battle tank) ====
GDELS SBS presented this variant at Eurosatory 2018. It is an ASCOD 2 with a gross weight of 42 t (93,000 lb) equipped with the turret Hitfact 120mm from Leonardo. The turret is armed with a smoothbore tank gun of 120mm L/45 by Leonardo, a 7.62×51mm NATO coaxial machine gun, a 7.62×51mm NATO pintle-mounted gun, and a remote weapon station on the roof equipped with a 12.7×99mm NATO heavy machine gun. The tank gun is coupled to a fire control system with a laser range finder, enabling precise shooting in movement.

==== ASCOD 2 – Cobra bridge layer ====
The Cobra is an assault bridge that can be transported and installed on a medium weight armoured vehicles such as the Piranha V and the ASCOD 2. These bridges are certified for MLC 120 (military load classification).

This bridge layer system was presented at IDET 2019 in Brno.

==== ASCOD Heavy Mission Carrier ====
The ASCOD HMC was presented at Eurosatory 2026.

This vehicle is designed with a rear platform for mission modules. Examples of applications include the Artillery Gun Module (Nemesis howitzer), the IRIS-T SLS Mk4 launchers, the Skorpion^{2} mining system, and many other applications are expected to be offered. The ASCOD HMC is built on a common 'rolling chassis' with the heavy version of ASCOD and so shares commonality in the lower hull, running gear, power pack, electronic architecture, and electrical equipment. Additionally, the ASCOD HMC's rear flat payload area enables compatibility with palletised loads and 10 ft ISO containers.

== Derivatives of the ASCOD 2 ==
=== British Army – Ajax SV ===
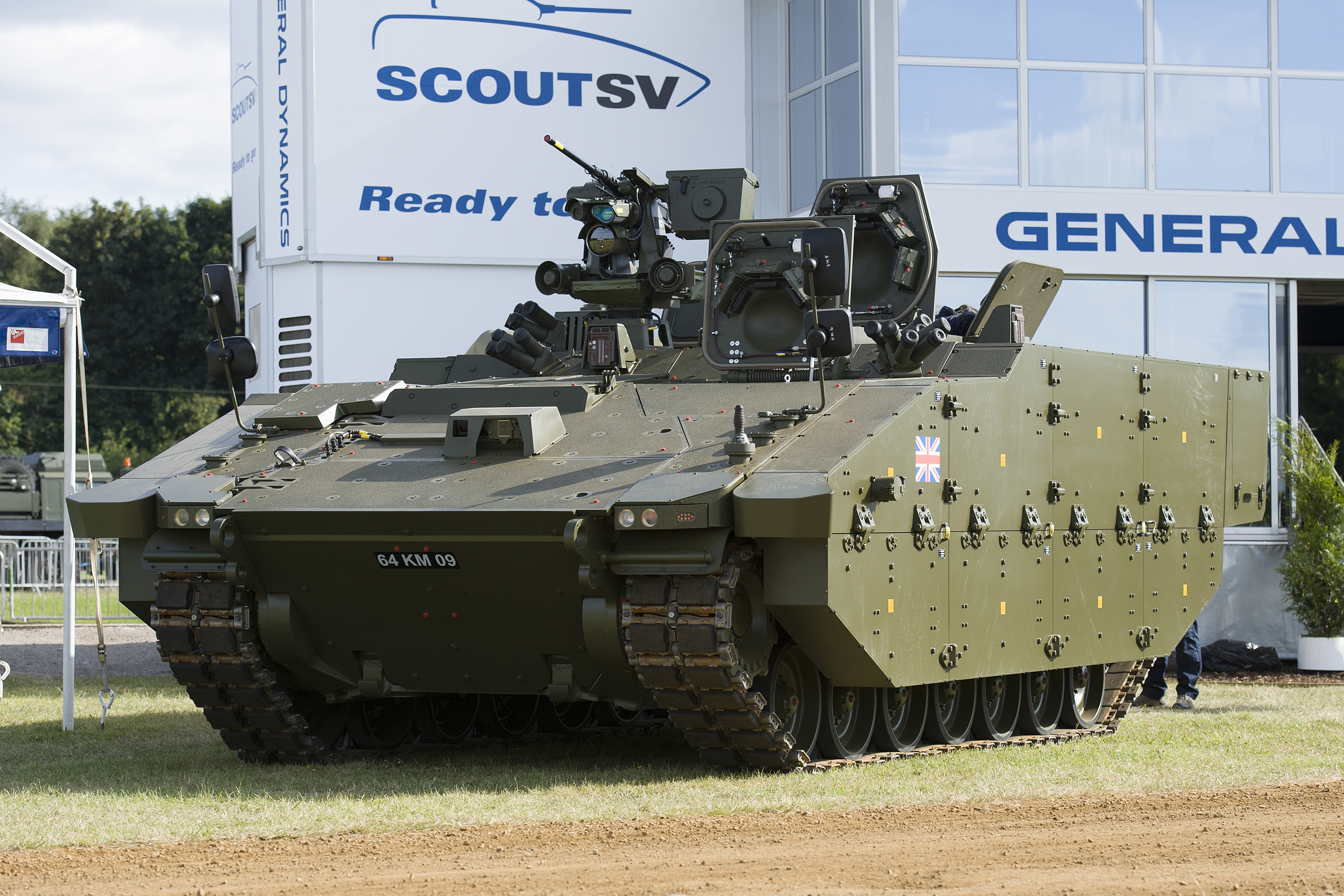
Scout SV

As part of the programme SCOUT SV, the ASCOD 2 was presented against the CV90 to replace the CVR(T) family, which included the FV107 Scimitar reconnaissance vehicle, the FV103 Spartan APC and the FV106 Samson armoured recovery vehicle.

In March 2010, the platform ASCOD 2 was chosen by the Ministry of Defence. This vehicle / programme was then renamed Ajax. Around 300 British engineers at General Dynamics UK's Oakdale facility began developing the Ajax from the ASCOD 2 after being awarded the contract in 2010. The Ajax program has been mired in problems centered around noise & vibration issues causing injuries to its operators. Over 300 personnel were injured and this resulted in claims for compensation against the MoD. Several being retired from service due to the damage done by the Ajax operating environment. The Ajax project was paused in April 2021 due to severe issues with the vehicle. GD promised to ‘mitigate’ the issues identified- not resolve them. In November 2025 Luke Pollard announced Initial Operating Capability (IOC) claiming senior Army personnel had assured him the vehicle is now safe. It has subsequently emerged that during Ajax summer trials further Army personnel were hospitalised with blurred vision, fatigue, tinnitus, headaches and disorientation. A Ajax safety exposure limit of six operational hours a day has been placed on the vehicle. Evidence is mounting that Ajax still suffers deep seated problems.

The British Army received its first ASCOD SV in 2020.

=== Philippine Army variants ===
In January 2021, the Philippine Army awarded a contract to supply light tanks to Elbit Systems (Israel). In June 2021, the contract for 18 light tanks based on the ASCOD 2 was signed. The contract also included a fire support variant equipped with the same turret based on the Pandur II (8×8).

The ASCOD 2 variant is a light tank (30 tons), equipped with a turret made and installed by Elbit Systems (105 mm L/52 rifled gun with an auto-loader). The production of the chassis took place in Spain with GDELS - SBS.

In December 2023, the Philippine Army unveiled a command post armoured vehicle based on the ASCOD 2. It is equipped with an Elbit UT25 unmanned turret.

In May 2025, the latest batch was delivered, and it included also an armoured recovery variant.

=== United States Army variants ===
Two main derivatives of the ASCOD 2:

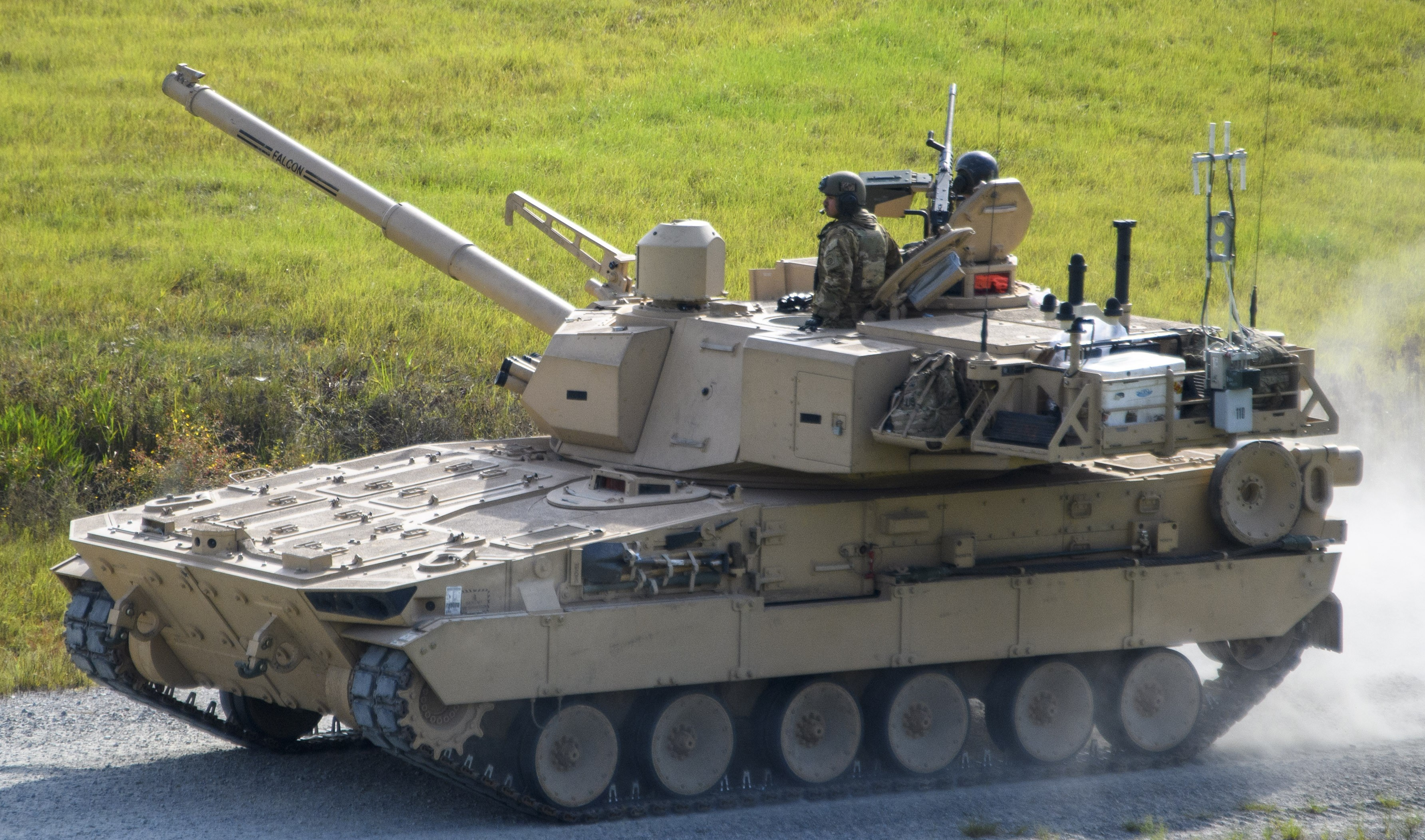
M10 Booker

- M10 Booker, where the Griffin 2 platform won the Mobile Protected Firepower programme in June 2022, had some deliveries in 2024 and 2025, but was cancelled in May 2025 because of its weight not corresponding to the requirements of the US Army.
- The Griffin III is competing against the KF-41 Lynx to become the future infantry fighting vehicle of the US Army. Both were pre-selected in June 2023 for the next stage of the programme, the XM-30, which will see prototypes of both companies tested. Following the selection, General Dynamics Land Systems was awarded a contract worth US$769 million, for the full design, the production and the testing of seven identical prototypes. The US Army worked with both contractors to reach the critical design review (June 2025, Milestone B). Since then, the production of the prototypes has started with the aim to supply them for testing in 2026, and by 2027 (Milestone C), the winner will be selected, and a first IFV is expected to be delivered by 2029.

=== NEMESIS howitzer ===
The NEMESIS is a tracked artillery system using the Artillery Gun Module from KNDS Deutschland that was presented in May 2025 at FEINDEF in Mardrid. It is a further evolution of the DONAR that was presented in 2008.

The specifications of the vehicle are:

- Engine: MTU 8V199 TE23, with 1,100 PS (810 kW)
- Turret / armament:
  - Gun: Rheinmetall 155mm L/52
  - Fire rate: > 8 per minute
  - Gun elevation: -2.5° to + 65°
  - Azimuth: 360° at full charge
  - Range:
    - 40 km (25 mi) with HE base bleed rounds
    - 54 km (34 mi) with Vulcano 155 Ballistic Extended Range (BER)
    - 70 km (43 mi) with Vulcano 155 Guided Long Range (GLR)
  - Payload:
    - 30 fused rounds
    - 144 modular charges
  - MRSI for up to 5 rounds
  - Shoot on the move capability, and shoot and scoot.

== Operators of the ASCOD 2 ==
=== Current operators ===
Latvia (1 + 83 on order)
Orders:
- January 2025, 42 ASCOD 2 IFV, for €373 million, with Elbit UT30 MK2 unmanned turret, selected in November 2024.
- 42 additional order approved for order by the parliament in June 2025. The contract was signed at the end of June 2025 worth €387 million.
Deliveries:
- October 2026, first delivered.
Spain (36)
36 VCZAP Castor (Vehículo de Combate de ZAPadores Castor), a sapper vehicle as part of the Phase II order of the ASCOD programme:
- 1 prototype delivered at the end of 2018.
- 6 serial production vehicles delivered in 2023 and entered service.
- 35 (all serial-production vehicles) delivered by February 2025.

=== Future operators ===
Spain (394)
In December 2023, the Spanish Army signed a contract for a first batch worth €2 billion for 394 Vehículo de Apoyo de Cadenas.
The variants split is unclear at the moment.

=== Potential operators / sales ===
Brazil
The Brazilian Army is looking for a modern tank (light or main battle tank) and an infantry fighting vehicle. The ASCOD 2 is in the competition, and the base base is offered in several options:
- Light tank:
  - ASCOD 2 120mm (a Spanish prototype of light tank)
- IFV: an ASCOD 2 with a turret with a 35mm canon.
Portugal
The Portuguese Army expressed an interest to order new tracke infantry fighting vehicles in February 2025. GDELS SBS is one of the candidates to supply the vehicle.
Ukraine
GDELS SBS presented a plan in June 2024 to manufacture 50 ASCOD infantry fighting vehicles per year for the Ukrainian Army. This plan follows a meeting between industry representatives and the Spanish state. In May 2024 a defence agreement between Spain and Ukraine led to this offer.
Also, in September 2023, an agreement was made between GDELS and LLC Ukrainian Armored Vehicles for a potential licence production of the ASCOD in Ukraine, after having visited the production facilities in Spain and tested the ASCOD.

=== Failed bids ===
Czech Republic (246)
The Czech Army initiated plans to replace its BVP-M2 in 2015.
In June 2017, five IFV types were tested for 9 days (ASCOD 2, CV90 in two variants, the KF-41 Lynx and the Puma).
After the tests, in December 2018 the ASCOD 2, a CV90, the KF-41 Lynx and the Puma were shortlisted. The Puma was announced withdrawn from the competition in October 2019.
After several hesitations on this investment, the Czech government selected the CV90 Mk IV in 2022, and the contract for 246 vehicles was signed in May 2023.
Denmark
In 2013, the Danish Army initiated the replacement of the M113, and pre-selected the ASCOD 2, the, CV90 Armadillo, the PMMC G5, the Mowag Piranha V and the VBCI.
In 2015, the Danish Army selected the Mowag Piranha V.
Romania (298)
Romania was looking to replace its MLI-84 in two phases.
The three main competitors for the successor were the KF-41 Lynx, the K21 Redback and the ASCOD 2. In November 2025, it was announced that Romania would acquire 298 Lynx from Rheinmetall with partial local production occurring.
The contract for the vehicles and derivatives funded through the SAFE programme was signed the 29 May 2026.
Slovakia (152 + 72)
Slovakia was looking for a successor to its BTR-80 fleet. A procurement procedure was launched in late 2021, for which the plan was to purchase 152 AIFV in a first phase and 82 during a second phase. Among the vehicles included in the bid were the ASCOD 2, the Borsuk, the CV9035 MkIV and the KF-41 Lynx.The Borsuk was eliminated after the trial period in 2021.
The CV90 was selected in June 2022, and the contract signed in May 2023.

== Operators of derivatives of the ASCOD 2 ==
=== Current operators ===
Philippine (20)
Three variants in service in the Philippine Army:
- 18 light tanks ordered in June 2021.
- 1 command and control vehicle received in December 2023, with an unmanned turret Elbut UT25.
- 1 armoured recovery vehicle received in May 2025.
United Kingdom (589)
The Ajax won the competition FRES in 2010.
The following variants and sub-variants are in service / being delivered:
- 245 Ajax, made of the sub-variants:
  - 198 Ajax – Reconnaissance and Strike
  - 24 Ajax – Ground Based Surveillance
  - 23 Ajax – Joint Fire Control
- 93 Ares – APC
- 112 Athena – Command and control
- 51 Argus – Engineer reconnaissance
- 38 Atlas – ARV
- 50 Apollo – Repair vehicles
United States (cancelled, status of existing vehicles unknown)
As part of the Mobile Protected Firepower (MPF) programme, the derivative of the ASCOD 2, which became the M10 Booker was selected in June 2022 to be produced for the US Army. But in May 2025, it was cancelled.
Orders that were signed:
- 12 prototypes ordered n September 2018 for evaluation.
- LRIP, 96 M10 ordered in June 2022, delivery planned for Q4FY25 for $1.14 billion.

=== Potential operators / sales ===
Brazil
The Brazilian Army is looking for a modern tank (light or main battle tank) and an infantry fighting vehicle. The ASCOD 2 is in the competition, and the base base is offered in several options:
- Potential light tank: M10 Booker
United States (up to 3,800)
The US Army is looking for a successor to the M2 / M3 Bradley. The Griffin III is one of the two finalists of a programme that could reach up to 3,800 vehicles, and be worth USD $45 billion.
As part of the XM-30 programme, the US Army ordered 7 identical Griffin III IFV prototypes to General Dynamics Land Systems, contract worth US$769 million.
The trials will take place in 2026, the selection in 2027, and the delivery should start in 2029.

=== Failed bids ===
Australia (129)
With the Land 400 Phase 3, Australia was looking for 450 tracked IFV to replace its 431 M113AS4.
GD UK offered the Ajax to the Australian Army, but the bid was rejected in 2021 as the programme was seen as problematic with its problems in the UK.
Australia pre-selected the KF-41 from Rheinmetall and the AS21 Redback by Hanwha in 2021. After evaluation of the prototypes, the AS21 Redback won the competition in July 2023. The contract was signed in December 2023, but for only 129 vehicles.
Spain (128)
The Spanish Army and the Marine Corps were looking for a successor to the M109A5 n 2025.
The programme had a pre-financing budget of €3 billion, in 2025, for wheeled (86 units) and a tracked self-propelled howitzer (128 units).
One of the requirements mentioned that the system has to be capable to be used in anti-ship operations, with moving targets. The other requirement included a barrel of 155mm L/47 to L/52 with a 40 km range minimum with base-bleed munitions.
The ASCOD 2 chassis was offered to the Spanish Army for the tracked component of the programme, the pre-financing budget reached €1.821 billion, and the systems to be included are:
- 128 tracked howitzers, based on ASCOD 2
- 21 recovery vehicles
- 59 command and control vehicles (48 for the Army, 11 for the Navy)
- Equipment for maintenance, training, logistics.
The GDELS Nemesis using the AGM turret was offered, with the same artillery system based on the Piranha Advanced Artillery Carrier (Piranha IV 10×10) for the wheeled component, this system was already selected by the Swiss Army.
The Spanish Army selected the K9 Howitzer from Hanwha, who collaborated with Indra Sistemas.

== See also ==
- Ajax – (United Kingdom)
- CV90 Mk IV – (Sweden)
- KF-41 Lynx – (Germany)
- Spz Puma – (Germany)
- M2 Bradley – (United States)
- Borsuk – (Poland)
- WPB Anders – (Poland)
- Tulpar – (Turkey)
- Dardo – (Italy)
- AS21 Redback – (South Korea)
- Type 89 – (Japan)
- ST Hunter – (Singapore)
- Kurganets-25 – (Russia)
