= Bergepanzer 2 =

German armored recovery vehicle

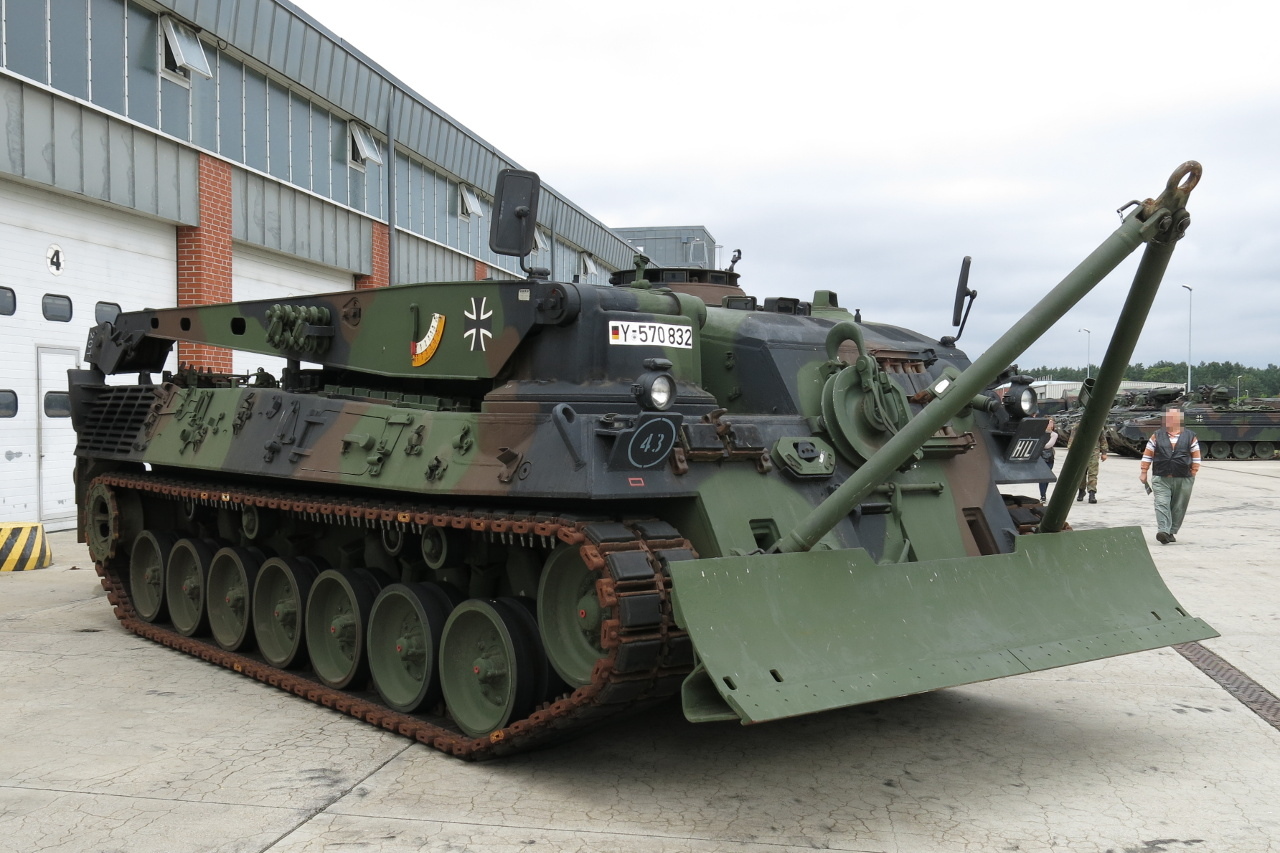
- Bergepanzer 2 of the German Army
- Type: Armoured recovery vehicle
- Place of origin: West Germany

Service history
- In service: 1966–present
- Used by: See Operators

Production history
- Designer: (Germany) Porsche (Germany) Jung Jungenthal (Germany) Atlas-MaK Maschinenbau (Germany) Luther-Werke
- Designed: 1960s
- Manufacturer: (Germany) Atlas-MaK Maschinenbau (Italy) OTO Melara
- Unit cost: DM 750.000 (1966)
- Produced: 1966–1978
- No. built: 742
- Variants: See Variants

Specifications
- Mass: 39.8 tonnes (43.9 short tons); 2A2: 40.6 tonnes (44.8 short tons)
- Length: 7.68 metres (25.2 feet)
- Width: 3.25 m (10.7 ft)
- Height: 2.69 m (8.8 ft) (crane boom retracted)
- Crew: 4
- Armor: Steel: 10–40 mm RHAe
- Main armament: 2×7.62 mm MG3
- Secondary armament: Smoke discharger
- Engine: MTU MB 838 CaM 500, 10-cylinder, 37.4 litres, multi-fuel engine 830 PS (820 hp) (2.86 kNm, 610 kW)
- Power/weight: 20.9 PS/t (20.6 hp/t); 2A2: 20.4 PS/t (20.1 hp/t)
- Transmission: ZF Friedrichshafen 4 HP-250
- Suspension: Torsion bar suspension
- Fuel capacity: 1,550 litres (341 imperial gallons; 409 US gallons); 2A1: 1,410 litres (310 imperial gallons; 372 US gallons)
- Operational range: 850 km (530 mi)
- Maximum speed: 62 km/h (39 mph)

The Bergepanzer 2 (BPz-2) is an armored recovery vehicle based on the Leopard 1 main battle tank, developed in the 1960s and manufactured by Atlas-MaK Maschinenbau for the West German army. It first entered service in 1966 and replaced the earlier Bergepanzer 1. Various versions have served in the armed forces of Germany and other countries. It was later succeeded by the Bergepanzer 3 "Büffel".

== History ==
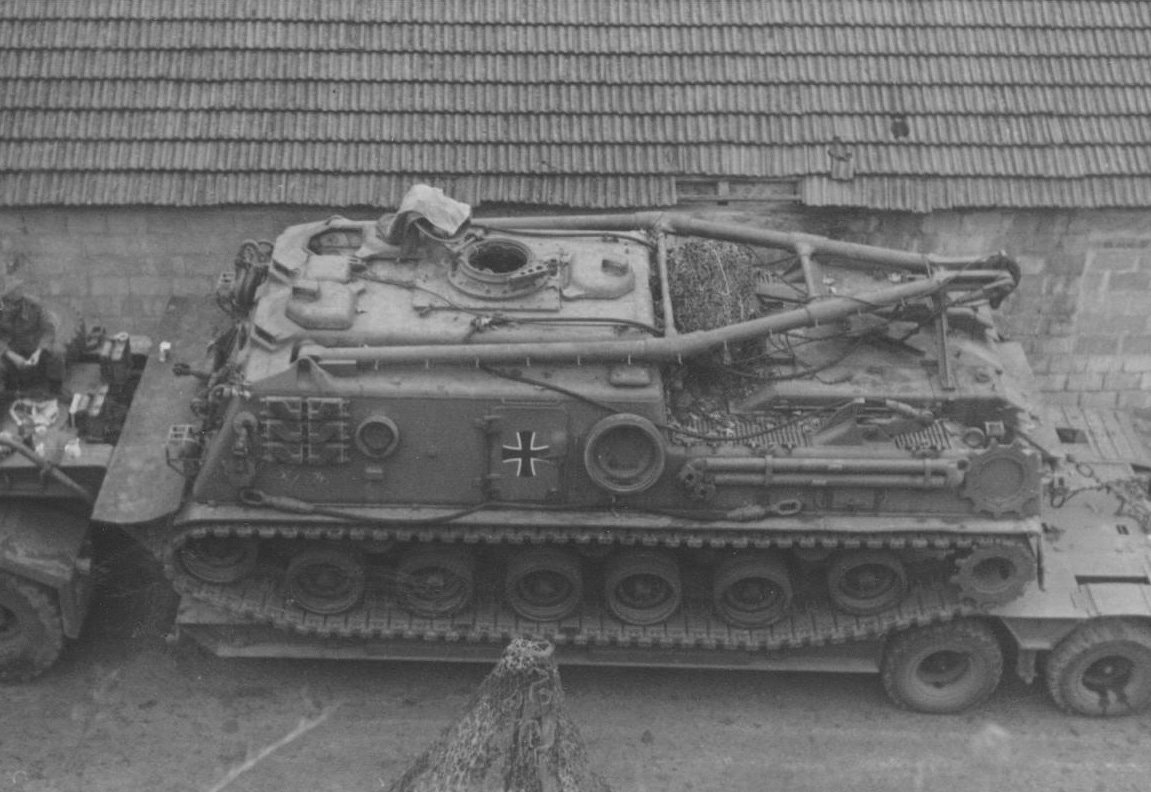
Predecessor Bergepanzer 1

The West German rearmament from the mid-1950s led to the initial equipping of the Bundeswehr with U.S. armored vehicles. In addition to M47 and M48 Patton main battle tanks, M74 armored recovery vehicles were introduced, which, from 1962, were replaced by the M88 Recovery Vehicle, designated "Bergepanzer 1".

=== Development ===
The Leopard 1 was designed from the outset as a family of vehicles. This was intended to significantly reduce the cost of operating, maintaining and repairing the tracked vehicles, since the personnel for many areas only required one-off training and the assemblies could be easily replaced.
Right after the Leopard, the armored recovery vehicle 2 was tackled. "Its main task is to recover or, as far as possible, repair on the spot tanks that have broken down on the battlefield due to enemy action or technical damage."

On September 9, 1966, the first Bergepanzer Standard rolled off the production line at MaK Kiel.

== Variants ==
=== WiSENT 1 ===
FFG offers the WiSENT in 3 different variants, the WiSENT 1 ARV, the WiSENT 1 AEV and the WiSENT 1 Mine Clearing.

== Technical data ==
Technical data
Description	Bergepanzer 2	Bergepanzer 2A1/Pionierpanzer 1	Bergepanzer 2A2	Bergepanzer "Wisent"
Type:	Armored recovery vehicle with self-supporting hull, turretless superstructure and crane boom			
Crew:	4			
Engine:	MTU MB 838 CaM 500, 10-cylinder, 37.4 litres, multi-fuel engine			
Displacement:	37.400 cm³			
Power output:	610 kW (830 PS)			706 kW (960 PS) 3300 Nm at 1600 min^{−1}
Cooling:	Thermostatically controlled axial fan			
Transmission:	ZF 4 HP-250 planetary gearbox with four forward and two reverse gears			
Suspension system:	Torsion bar spring mounted support roller drive			Torsion bar spring mounted support roller drive with hydraulic dampers
Overall length: (Clearing blade in driving position)	7570 mm	7980 mm	7680 mm	8210 mm
Overall width:	3250 mm			
Overall height:	2695 mm			2970 mm (with topcase)
Ground clearance:	440 mm			
Wading depth without preparation:	1200 mm			
Wading depth with wading snorkel:	2250 mm			
Underwater driving depth w. underwater snorkel:	4000 mm			
Trench passability:	2500 mm			
Climbing ability:	1150 mm	880 mm	1000 mm	880 mm
Gradeability:	60 %			
Cross slope capability:	30 %			
Empty weight:	39.200 kg	40.200 kg	39.980 kg	47.000 kg
Combat weight:	39.800 kg	40.800 kg	40.600 kg	54.000 kg (max. 56.000 kg)
Maximum speed:	62 km/h			
Fuel capacity:	1550 l	1410 l	1550 l	–
Fuel consumption and operating range (road):	840 km at 165 l/100 km	650 km at 165 l/100 km	840 km at 165 l/100 km	–
Fuel consumption and operating range (terrain):	400 km (2A1) bis 500 km at 300 l/100 km (Consumption above 400 l/100 km is not uncommon in towing operations)			–
Turning radius:	496 cm			
Clearing blade width:	3250 mm	3250 mm (3750 mm with increased width blade)	3250 mm	3250 mm (3750 mm with increased width blade)
Clearing blade height:	591 mm	995 mm	591 mm	995 mm
Armament:	2 × 7.62×51mm NATO MG3 or C6 GPMG as anti aircraft gun and front gun, smoke discharger			smoke discharger, armament varies depending on user
Ammunition:	4250 cartridges pverall for both MG3			–

== Operators ==
Map with Bergepanzer 2 operators in blue and former operators in red

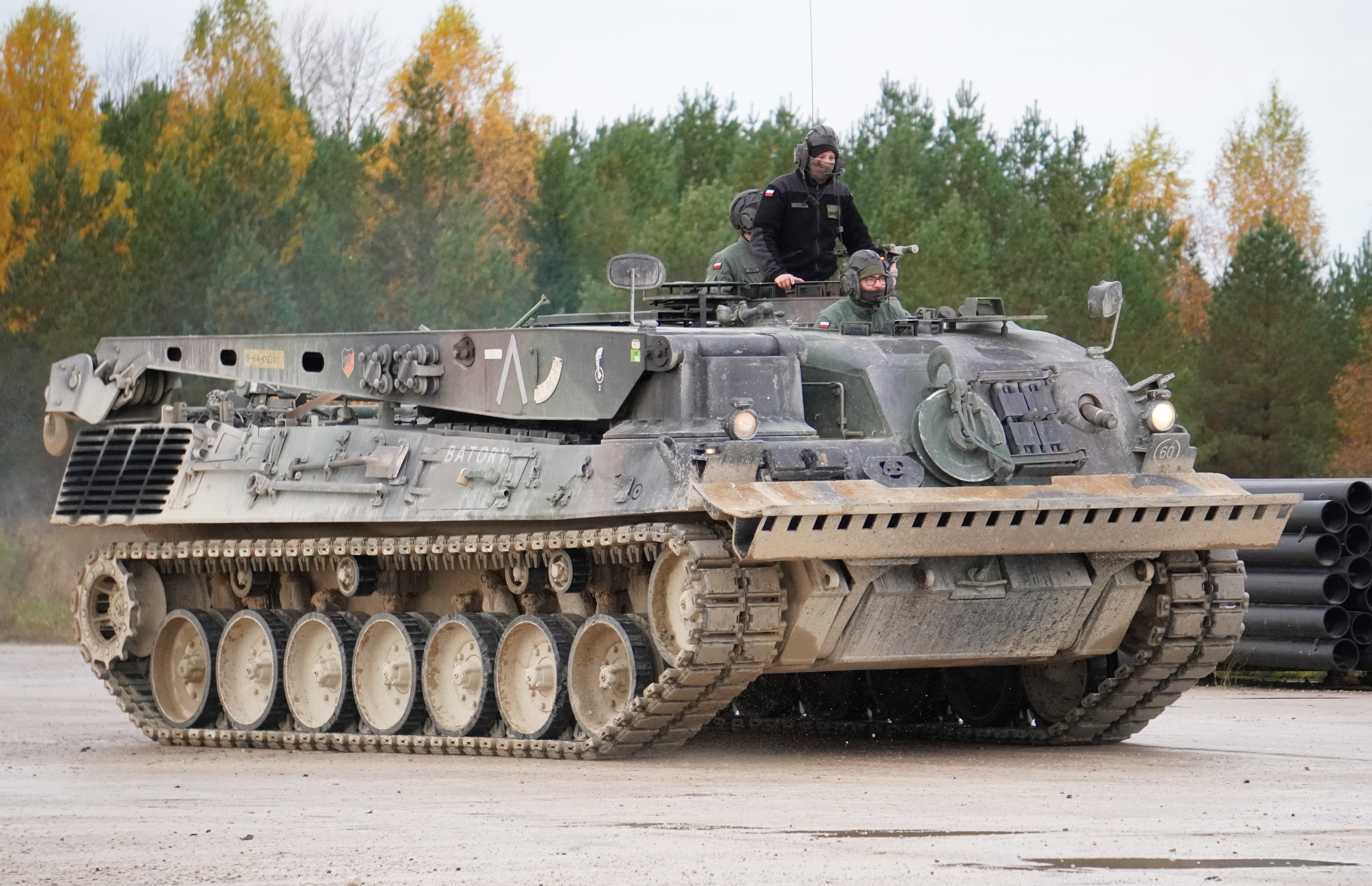
Bergepanzer 2 of the Polish Land Forces.

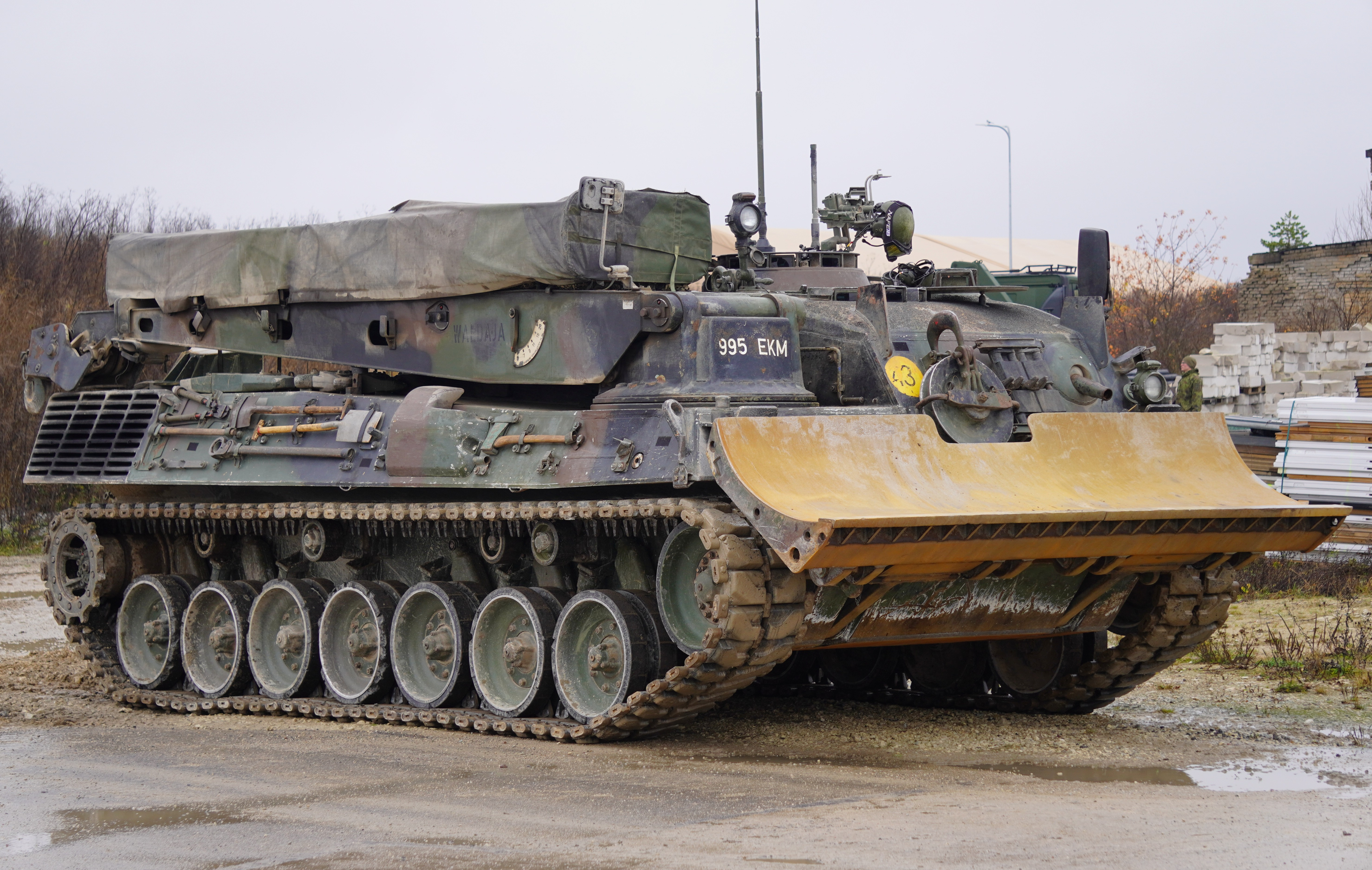
A Bergepanzer 2A1, or Pionierpanzer 1, of the Estonian Land Forces.

=== Current operators ===
- Brazil – Brazil operates a least 1 BPz-2 as of 2021.
- Chile – Chile operates 35 BPz-2 as of 2021.
- Denmark – Denmark operates 10 BPz-2 and 6 WiSENT 1 as of 2021.
- Estonia – Estonia operates 2 BPz-2 as of 2021.
- Finland – Finland operates 9 BPz-2 as of 2021.
- Germany – Germany operates 82 BPz-2 as of 2021.
  - Army – 59
  - Joint Support Service – 23
- Greece – Greece operates 43 BPz-2 as of 2021.
- Italy – Italy operates 137 BPz-2 as of 2021. MaK originally delivered 69 BPz-2 and 12 Pionierpanzer. The Italian company OTO Melara produced another 68 Bergepanzer 2 under license.
- Lithuania – Lithuania operates 8 BPz-2 as of 2021.
- Netherlands – The Netherlands operate more than 4 BPz-2 as of 2021.
  - Army – Unknown number
  - Marine Corps – 4
- Norway – Norway operates 6 BPz-2, named NM217 Bergepanservogn as of 2021.
- Poland – Poland operates 28 BPz-2 as of 2021.
- Turkey – Turkey operates 12 BPz-2 as of 2022.
- Ukraine – ~39 pledged or delivered (31 from Germany, ~2 from Norway and 5 in cooperation from Germany and Denmark), while 1 was damaged.

=== Former operators ===
- Australia – Australia received 8 Bergepanzer 2 in 1977 with the introduction of the Leopard 1. The vehicles were deployed with the Australian Army, designated "Armoured Recovery Vehicle – Medium" (ARVM). With the arrival of the M1 Abrams in 2007, the Bergepanzer 2 retired.
- Belgium – The Belgian Army originally had a stock of 36 BPz-2. 20 remaining vehicles were upgraded to the Bergepanzer 2000 in 2002. One vehicle was sold to Brazil. With the transformation of the Army, which eliminated tracked vehicles, the Bergepanzer 2 retired.
- Canada – Canada maintained 9 Bergepanzer 2A2s. The vehicles, designated "Taurus", were deployed in the tank companies of the Canadian Army. The armament used was the C6 GPMG machine gun. Divestment of the Taurus was expected upon final delivery of the Bergepanzer 3, designated "Mammoth".

== See also ==
- Leopard 1
- Bergepanzer 1
- Bergepanzer 3
