= Sabrah light tank =

Light tank in the Philippine military

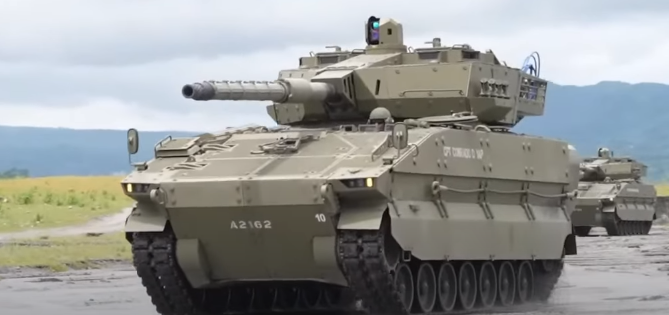
- Sabrah light tanks during a Philippine Army exercise
- Type: Light tank (tracked); Tank destroyer / Fire support vehicle (wheeled)
- Place of origin: Israel (turret and systems); Austria / Spain (ASCOD chassis); Czech Republic (Pandur II chassis)

Service history
- In service: 2022–present
- Used by: Philippine Army

Production history
- Designer: Elbit Systems
- Designed: 2020–2021
- Manufacturer: Elbit Systems; GDELS-SBS (ASCOD); Excalibur Army (Pandur II)
- Developed from: ASCOD 2 Pandur II

Specifications
- Mass: 30 tonnes (33 short tons) – 33 tonnes (36 short tons) (ASCOD variant)
- Length: 7.6 metres (24.93 ft) (ASCOD)
- Width: 3.4 metres (11.15 ft) (ASCOD)
- Height: 3.67 metres (12.04 ft) (ASCOD)
- Crew: 3
- Armor: STANAG 4569 Level 4 ballistic protection
- Main armament: 1 × 105 mm Elbit Systems Land rifled gun
- Secondary armament: 1 × 7.62 mm FN MAG coaxial machine gun 8 × 76 mm smoke grenade launchers
- Engine: Diesel; 720 hp
- Suspension: Torsion bar and rotary dampers (ASCOD)
- Maximum speed: 72 kilometres per hour (45 mph) (road)

The Sabrah light tank is a family of armored fighting vehicles developed by the Israeli defense company Elbit Systems to meet the Philippine Army's light tank and fire support vehicle requirements.

The platform is offered in two primary configurations: a tracked light tank based on the ASCOD 2 chassis manufactured by General Dynamics European Land Systems (GDELS-SBS), and an 8×8 wheeled tank destroyer/fire support vehicle based on the Pandur II chassis manufactured by Excalibur Army. Both configurations share a common Elbit-designed manned turret armed with a 105 mm rifled gun. Elbit Systems was awarded a $172 million contract to supply the vehicles to the Philippines in January 2021 as part of the country's military modernization program.

== Background and procurement ==
The acquisition of the Sabrah light tank originated from the AFP Modernization Program "Horizon 2" phase, which included a specific requirement for a new light tank to replace the Philippine Army's aging fleet of Light Vehicle Wheeled (LVW) and V-150 fire support vehicles. The Philippine Army sought a platform capable of providing direct fire support and anti-armor capabilities while maintaining a low enough weight to navigate the archipelago's limited road infrastructure and bridges.

Elbit Systems emerged as the winning bidder, defeating competing proposals such as the FNSS Kaplan MT (Harimau) and the Hanwha K21-105. In January 2021, the Department of National Defense signed a three-year contract worth $172 million with Elbit Systems. The contract covers the delivery of 18 tracked ASCOD 2 light tanks and 10 wheeled Pandur II fire support vehicles, along with command and recovery variants based on the ASCOD 2 chassis.

== History ==
The first units of the Sabrah light tank arrived in the Philippines in late December 2022. Throughout 2023, the Philippine Army's Armor Division conducted extensive testing, crew familiarization, and live-fire exercises with the newly delivered platforms.

On 5 March 2024, the Philippine Army formally inducted its first batch of new armored vehicles into active service during a ceremony at Camp O’Donnell in Tarlac. The induction included nine tracked ASCOD 2 Sabrah light tanks, one ASCOD 2 command post vehicle, five Guarani 6×6 armored personnel carriers, and heavy recovery trucks.

== Design ==
=== Protection and survivability ===
The Sabrah light tank features a modular armor package designed to provide ballistic protection up to STANAG 4569 Level 4 standards, capable of withstanding 14.5 mm armor-piercing rounds and artillery shell fragments. The ASCOD 2 tracked variant incorporates a specialized hull design with enhanced underbelly protection against anti-tank mines and improvised explosive devices (IEDs). The vehicle can be optionally fitted with an active protection system (APS) and a laser warning receiver to further increase survivability in high-threat environments.

=== Armament ===
Both the tracked and wheeled variants utilize a common Elbit Systems 105 mm manned turret. The primary armament is a 105 mm/52 caliber rifled gun with a low-recoil mechanism, thermal shroud, and integrated muzzle brake. The gun is capable of firing standard NATO 105 mm ammunition, including armor-piercing fin-stabilized discarding sabot (APFSDS), high-explosive squash head (HESH), and high-explosive anti-tank (HEAT) rounds.

The main gun is fed by an autoloader system containing 12 ready-to-fire rounds in the turret bustle drum, with an additional 24 rounds stowed in the hull; manual loading is available as a backup. Secondary armament consists of a 7.62 mm FN MAG coaxial machine gun and eight 76 mm smoke grenade launchers for self-defense and screening.

=== Sensors and electronics ===
The Sabrah is equipped with Elbit's TORCH-X battle management system (BMS), which integrates navigation, communications, and situational awareness data for the crew. The fire control system (FCS) features dual-axis stabilization, allowing for accurate "hunter-killer" target engagement while the vehicle is on the move.

The commander is provided with an independent panoramic sight featuring day/night electro-optical sensors and a thermal imager, while the gunner utilizes a separate high-definition optical sight paired with a laser rangefinder capable of measuring targets up to 7,000 meters away. Communications are handled by Elbit's E-LynX software-defined radio (SDR) network.

== Variants ==
=== ASCOD 2 Sabrah (Tracked) ===
Categorized by the Philippine Army as a "tracked light tank," this variant is based on the ASCOD 2 (Austrian Spanish Cooperative Development) chassis. The platform weighs approximately 30 tonnes and is powered by an eight-cylinder diesel engine producing 720 horsepower, coupled to a hydro-mechanical transmission and a torsion bar suspension system.

=== Pandur II Sabrah (Wheeled) ===
Categorized as a "wheeled light tank" or fire support vehicle, this variant is based on the 8×8 Pandur II chassis. The Pandur II chassis offers higher ground clearance and a robust automatic drivetrain management system that adjusts power distribution to the wheels based on off-road terrain conditions. It is powered by a Cummins ISLe T450 HPCR diesel engine.

== Operators ==
- Philippines:
  - Philippine Army – 18 tracked ASCOD 2 light tanks and 10 wheeled Pandur II fire support vehicles ordered in 2021, alongside command and recovery variants. The first batch of 9 tracked units and 1 command vehicle was formally inducted into the Armor "Pambato" Division in March 2024.

== See also ==
- FNSS Kaplan MT – A competing light tank design
- M1128 mobile gun system – A comparable wheeled fire support vehicle
- 2S25 Sprut-SD — A comparable tracked assault gun
- M41 Walker Bulldog - Former light tank used by the Philippines
