= Mowag Trojan infantry fighting vehicle =

MOWAG IFV Trojan
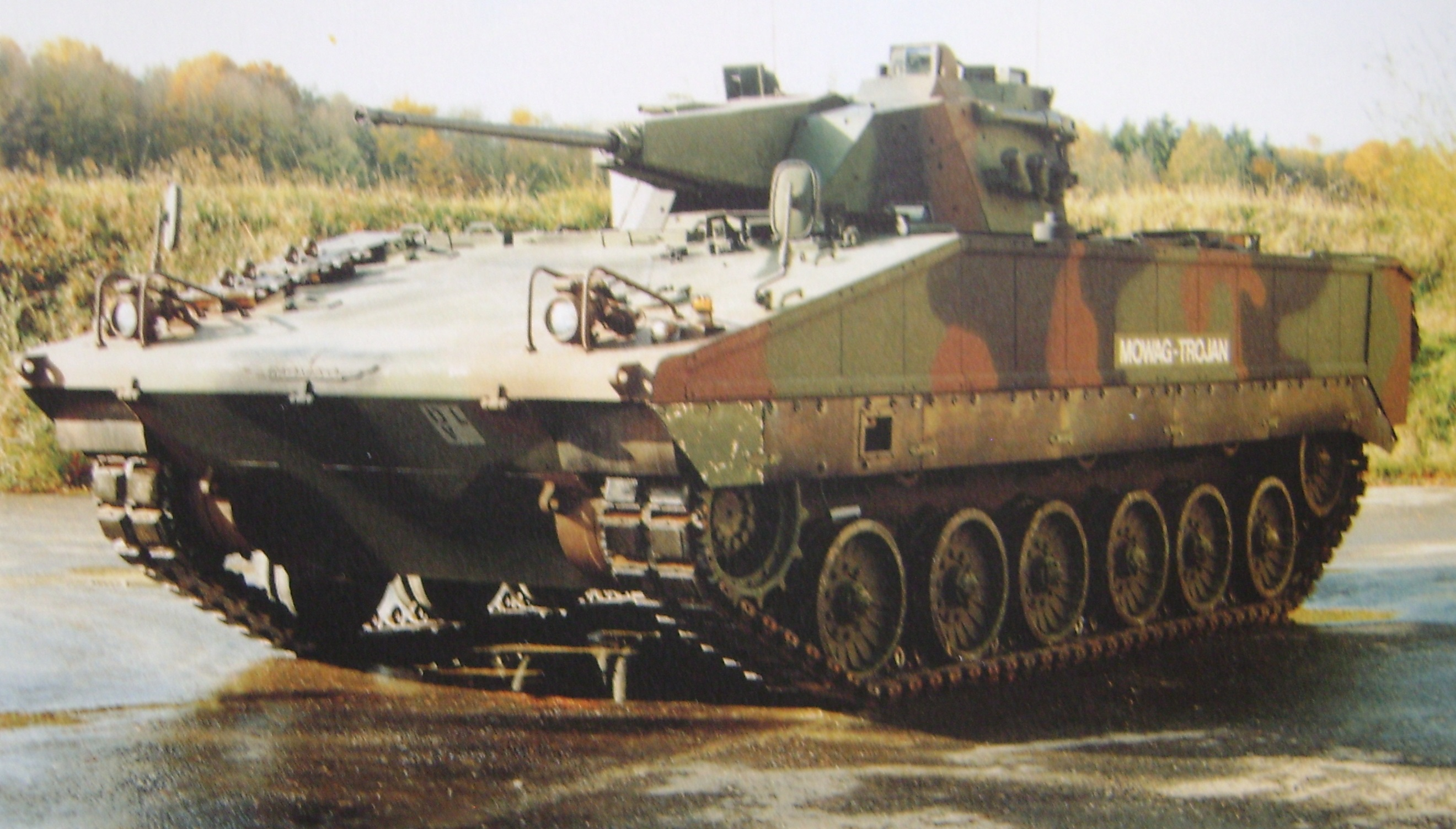
- MOWAG Trojan at the Swiss Military Museum Full
- Type: IFV APC
- Place of origin: Switzerland

Service history
- Used by: TC-200 and TC-500 trial in FDF

Production history
- Manufacturer: MOWAG Kreuzlingen
- Produced: 1990
- No. built: >1 Swiss, More than 2 in Finland
- Variants: TC-200 and TC-500 (Only Finland)

Specifications
- Crew: 9: driver, commander, gunner + 6 Panzergrenadiere
- Main armament: turret OERLIKON GBD COA with 1x25mm KBA B02 and 1x coaxial 7.62 mm MG3
- Secondary armament: 4x 76mm rocket launcher.
- Engine: MTU 8V-183 TE22, V8-Diesel14600cm ³ 600HP
- Transmission: RENK, HSWL 106 Hydromechanic Transmission converter, switching, automatic gearbox with 6 forward gears, 3 reverse
- Maximum speed: 70 km/h (43 mph)

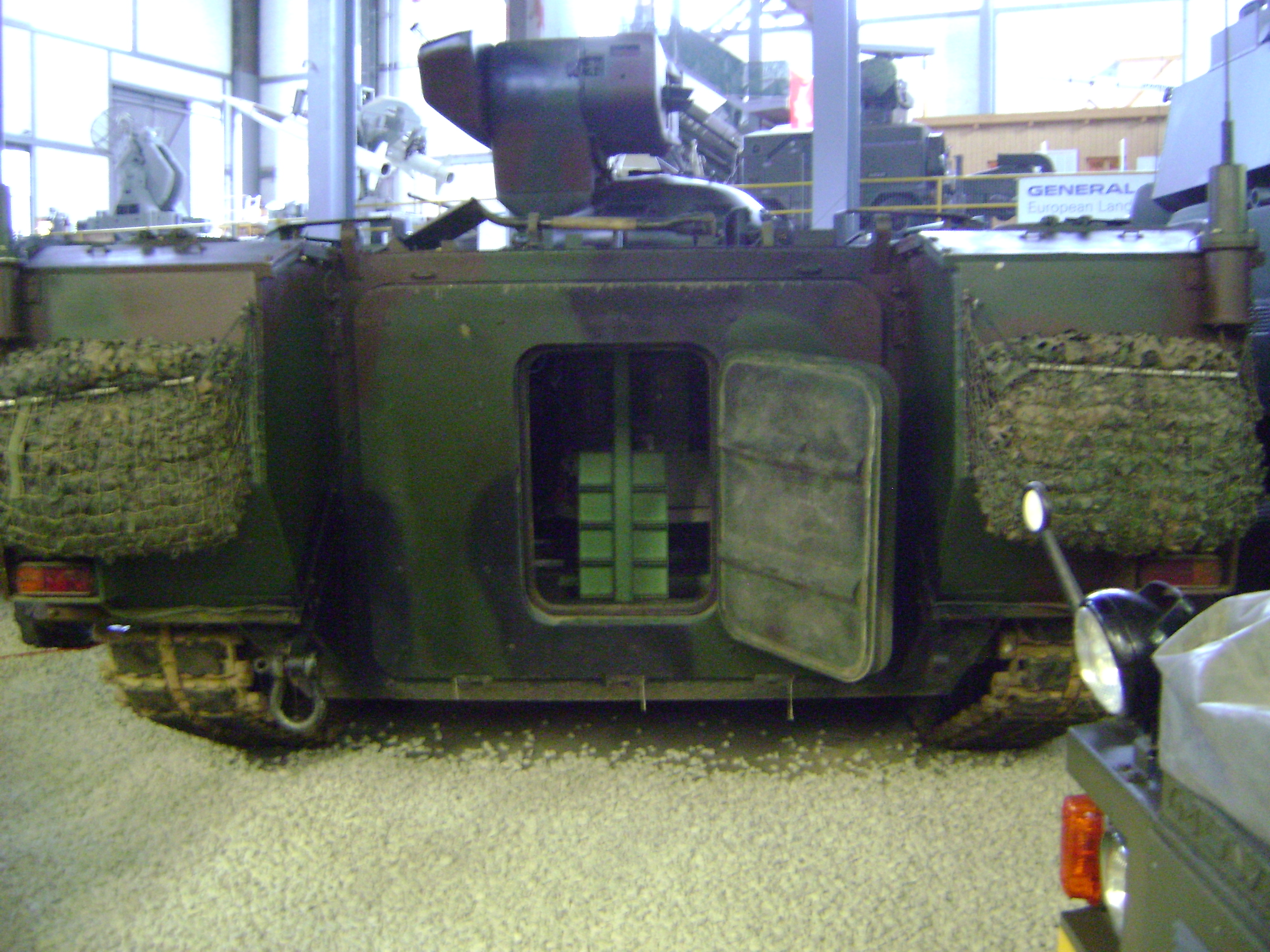
MOWAG Trojan Heck

The AIFV (armored infantry fighting vehicle) Mowag Trojan was built as a prototype and tested in the New IFV program NSpz (Neuer Schützenpanzer) for Switzerland in 1990. The NSpz was intended to replace the M113 used by the Swiss Army. It was first equipped with the Steyr SP 3E/300 turret, and later with the Oerlikon GBA COA turret. It was equipped with various technological innovations such as outside lying fuel tanks, preheating and heating system, compartmentalized additional armor on the sides, which could be easily upgraded, splinter protection in the interior and s hydraulic rear ramp with integrated door and side protection. Due to financial shortages in the military budget, procurement should be begin with almost 10 years delay. MOWAG was not able to keep the production for the Trojans so long unused. Mowag participated no more in the second, later selection of NSpz, now called Schützenpanzer2000 (SP2000) in 1998 to 1999. The Swiss Army then purchased the Swedish CV90. The Trojan was the last tracked vehicle made by the company MOWAG . The Trojan was until 2005 owned by the company MOWAG. It is now at the Military Museum Full.

Finnish defense company Patria bought a license to build these, and they built a couple of prototypes in 25mm, 30mm and 35mm Bushmaster guns. These were made to compete for the Finnish Military acquisition program for a new armored vehicle, however the Swedish CV90 beat the Patria TC-200 and TC-500 and thus these Patria variants remained just prototypes and went no further.

== Variants ==
Foreign variants

Finland

- Patria TC-200, 25, 30 or 35 mm gun options with either 7.62 NATO or Russian PKM (Service version would have been the Russian PKM)
- Patria TC-500, either IFV with 30 mm or an anti-tank version with TOW launcher
