= SP70 =

Panzerhaubitze 70
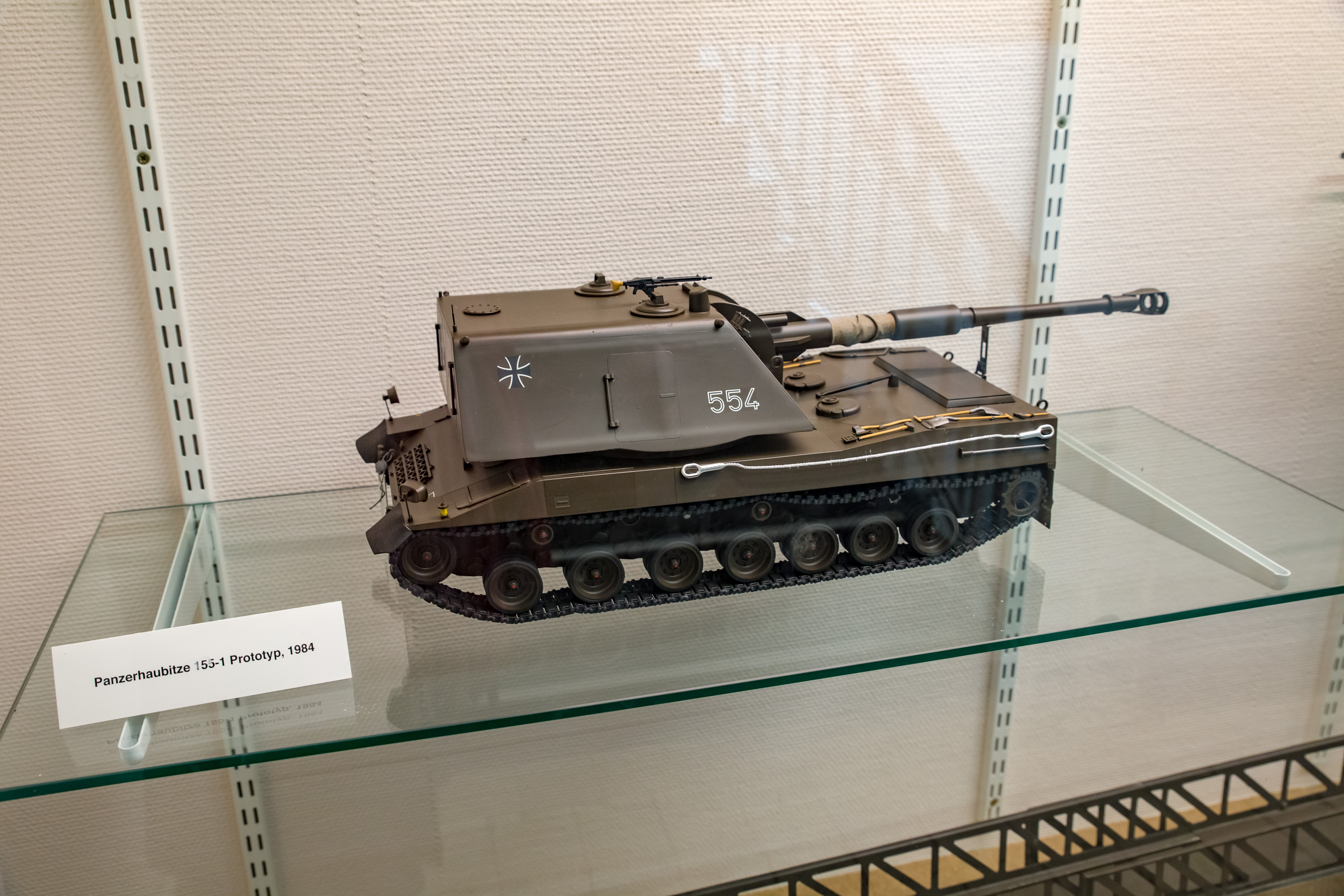
- Scale model of the SP70 in the 1984 prototype B version (German Bundeswehr pattern)
- Type: Self-propelled gun
- Place of origin: Germany, Great Britain and Italy

Production history
- Designed: 1973-1984

Specifications
- Mass: 43.524 t (47.977 short tons)
- Length: 7.637 m (25 ft 0.7 in)
- Width: 3.5 m (11 ft 6 in)
- Height: 2.8 m (9 ft 2 in)
- Crew: 5 (driver, layer, crew chief, magazine operator, charge loader)
- Rate of fire: 3 rounds in 10 seconds (burst) or 6 rounds per minute
- Effective firing range: 24 km (15 mi); 30 km (19 mi) (with base bleed projectiles)
- Armor: aluminum 50 mm + optional bomblet protection
- Main armament: FH70 155 mm L/39 artillery gun (32 rounds)
- Secondary armament: one roof-mounted 7.62 mm machine gun
- Engine: MTU MB871 8 cylinders turbocharged diesel 1000 hp (736 kW)
- Power/weight: 22 bhp/t
- Suspension: torsion bar
- Operational range: 420 km (260 mi)cross-country 550 km (340 mi) on roads
- Maximum speed: Road: 67,7 km/h (42 mph)

SP70 (in German also Panzerhaubitze 70 or Panzerhaubitze 155-1) self-propelled gun was a scheme set up by several European nations including the UK, Germany and Italy beginning in 1973. The project was shelved in favour of the US M109, which was already in service. The SP70 was "outgunned" on several occasions by the M109 and further development was cancelled in the 1980s.

The role envisioned for the SP70, which was to replace the widely used U.S. M109 self-propelled howitzer, was ultimately fulfilled in UK service by the AS-90 ("Artillery system for the nineties"), another self-propelled 155 mm howitzer system, which was originally created by an independent team which had anticipated that the SP70 project would fail.

== Technical description ==
=== Crew ===
The interior layout has space for three crewmen on the right (the layer, the crew chief, and the magazine operator) and the charge loader on the left. The total detachment is five men, the driver being located forward in the hull. There are two turret hatches equipped with periscopes which allow the crew chief and charge loader all-around vision both day and night. The elevating mass consists of the gun and cradle extension for both the loading system and cradle and the recoil mechanism. The mass is mounted on two trunnion roller bearings and a large saddle, which not only connects it with the turret but also blocks off the turret opening.

=== Protection ===
Both the hull and the turret shell of the SP70 are made of aluminium and meet the requirements for protection against 7.62 mm armor-piercing rounds, 14.5 mm armor-piercing rounds at 100 meters and shell fragments from a 152 mm shell bursting at 10 meters.

The NBC seal is provided by a mantlet and mantlet seal. The SP70 provides full NBC collective protection for the crew with charcoal filters and a ventilation unit.

=== Armament ===
The elevation system consists of a combined balance and power elevator. Like the recoil system, this is an excellent Italian contribution to the SP70. The elevation system consists of a hydraulic cylinder which provides the power for both elevation drive and corrects the out-of-balance movement of the elevating mass, should there be any deviation of the gun elevation selected after the firing of a round, a compensator re-establishes the correct elevation angle, thereby allowing a high rate of accurate fire to be achieved automatically. Conventional power traverse is fitted, and there is a manual backup for both traverse and elevation should the power fail.

The internal ballistics of the FH70 howitzer meet the requirements of the Quadrilateral Ballistics Memorandum of Understanding; i.e., all charges may be used and current and future 155 mm projectiles can be fired. The barrel is of autofrettage monoblock construction, fitted with a muzzle brake and fume extractor. The breech mechanism has a vertical sliding block opening upwards; there is an opening cam which opens the breech automatically on run-out. The breech is fitted with a primer magazine which automatically ejects the spent primer and feeds in a new one.

=== Ammunition handling ===
On the outside of the gun is a shell replenishment gear with an extending arm which can be adjusted to collect a projectile at ground level or from the back of a truck. From this point onwards, the projectile is untouched by human hand; once it reaches the magazine in the turret, it is moved by the magazine hoist to its selected storage row and is then moved along the row by the action of the rigidly mounted pawls. Hence the title "rigid pawl magazine". This magazine holds 32 projectiles and will take any of the current M107, M549, M483 projectile family.

To transfer the 155 mm projectile to the breech, the magazine hoist collects the projectile, which is pushed forward onto the shell transfer arm; and this arm, which is pivoted at the trunnions, swings into line with the cradle extension. Here the projectile is transferred to the ready-use tray. If the loading tray is empty, the projectile is automatically rolled farther onto the loading tray, ready for flick-ramming into the gun.

The shell replenishment gear is capable of reloading the magazine at a rate of four rounds per minute, which means that the 32 round magazine can be filled in 8 minutes. There are, of course, safety cutouts in the shell transfer arm to prevent injury to the external crew members during its operation. The propellant cartridges are stowed on the left of the breech; and the cartridge loader completes the loading action, including the signal to close the breech. For the first round, the loading tray is lifted hydraulically for subsequent rounds of a mission since the gun, in running out, moves past a mechanical catch and lifts the loading tray with it.

The SP70 has a burst-fire capability of three rounds in 10 seconds, which gives it an enormously powerful punch the "rapid" rate will give at least six rounds per minute until the ammunition in the magazine is expended. For sustained fire, the normal procedure is to use "through-loading" from external ammunition supplies.

=== Sighting system ===
The indirect-fire periscopic sight is fitted with an electronic tilt compensator that records the tilt of the vehicle by means of sensors and converts this directly into correction signals which are automatically applied to elevation and azimuth as displayed in the layer's display unit. The eyepiece of the periscope sight is mounted in such a way that both the layer and crew chief can view in turn, thus giving the crew chief a means of checking the layer. The firing command is passed to the gun by means of data input/output units, which link the gun directly to the fire control equipment. The direct fire day/night telescope sight is sited in such a way that it can be used by either the layer or the crew chief.

=== Chassis ===
The chassis is custom built by Porsche using proved Leopard 1 tank components. The diesel engine from the firm MTU gives the self-propelled gun a level of mobility as good as that of a main battle tank, but it also provides two other major advantages: there is power to spare for any weight increases caused by future upgrades and, secondly, being understressed for most conditions of use, its reliability is excellent. The power-to-weight ratio is better than 22 brake horsepower (bhp) per metric ton, with its turbo-charged, liquid-cooled, V8, 1000 hp diesel engine. A 35 hp Fiat 237A diesel engine is used as an APU.

The SP70 has a road range of 550 kilometers and a cross-country range of 420 kilometers. Since mobility is considered so important, the SP70 is designed to wade to a depth of over 2 meters it only takes pressing a switch and closing the driver's hatch, thanks in part to the equipment's effective NBC sealing.
