= Borsuk (infantry fighting vehicle) =

Polish infantry fighting vehicle

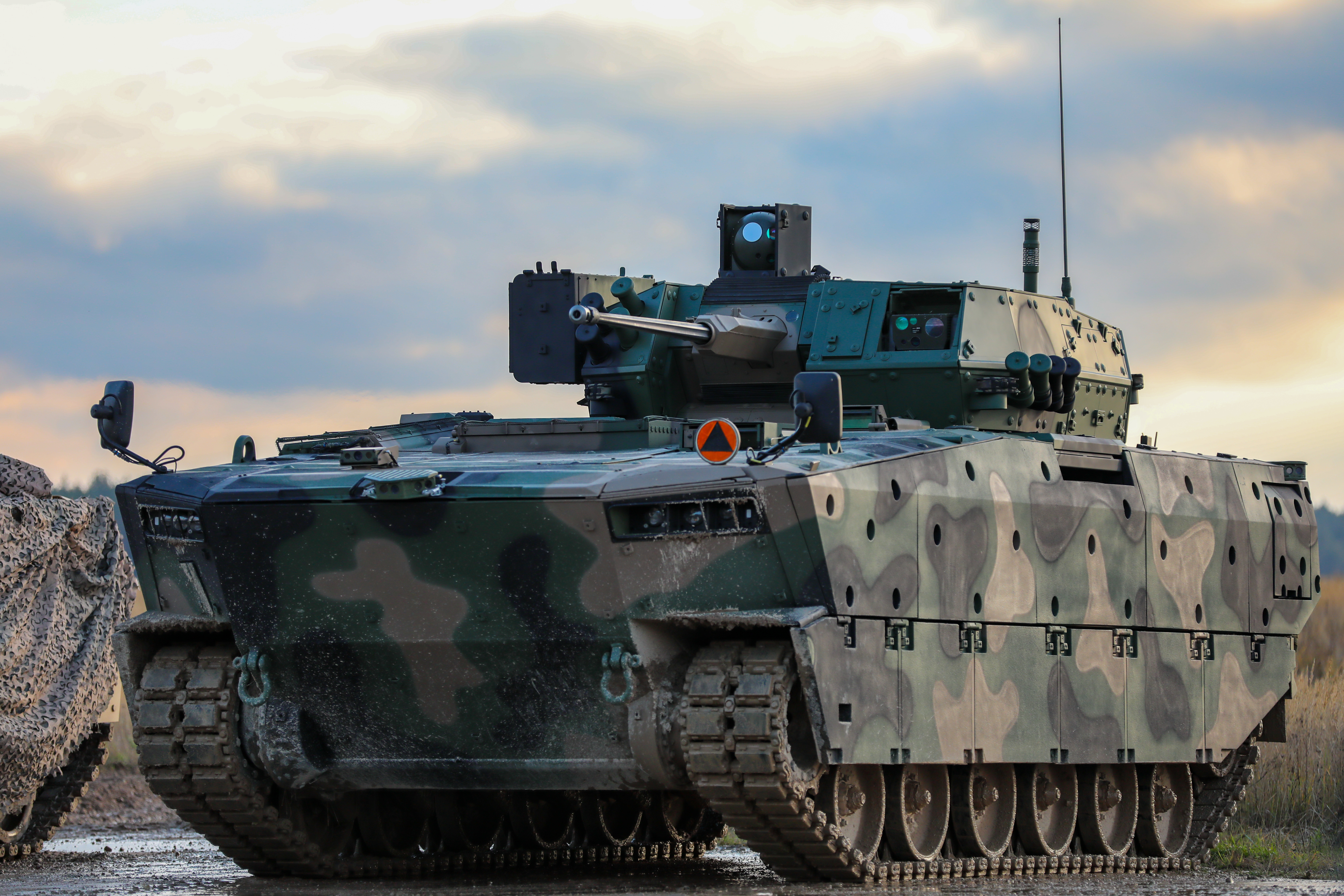
- Borsuk during the 2022 state trials
- Type: Infantry fighting vehicle
- Place of origin: Poland

Service history
- In service: 2025-present
- Used by: Polish Land Forces

Production history
- Designer: Consortium led by HSW
- Manufacturer: HSW
- No. built: 5/5 (prototypes); 20/262 (2nd contract)

Specifications
- Mass: 28 tonnes (30.9 short tons)
- Length: 7.6 m (24 ft 11 in)
- Width: 3.4 m (11 ft 2 in)
- Height: Overall: 3.34 m (10 ft 11.5 in); Turret ceiling: 2.95 m (9 ft 8 in)
- Crew: 3 (commander, gunner, driver); 6 troopers
- Main armament: 30mm Mk44S Bushmaster II autocannon; 2× Spike-LR anti-tank guided missile
- Secondary armament: 7.62mm UKM-2000C coaxial machine gun; 8× 81mm GAk-81 smoke grenades
- Engine: MTU 8V199 TE20 turbo diesel 720 hp (530 kW)
- Power/weight: 25.7 hp/t (18.9 kW/t)
- Transmission: Perkins X300 (prototypes); Allison 3040 MX (production)
- Suspension: hydropneumatic
- Operational range: 550 km (340 mi)
- Maximum speed: Road: 65 km/h (40.4 mph); Water: 8 km/h (5 mph)

Borsuk (Note: "Borsuk" means "badger" in Polish) is an amphibious infantry fighting vehicle produced by Huta Stalowa Wola, a part of Polish Armaments Group (PGZ). It is designed to replace the BWP-1 IFV that has been in service with the Polish Armed Forces since 1973 but is now obsolete.

Although often referred to as BWP Borsuk, BWP is not an official part of the name but rather an abbreviation of Bojowy Wóz Piechoty, Polish for "infantry fighting vehicle".

== Development ==
=== History ===
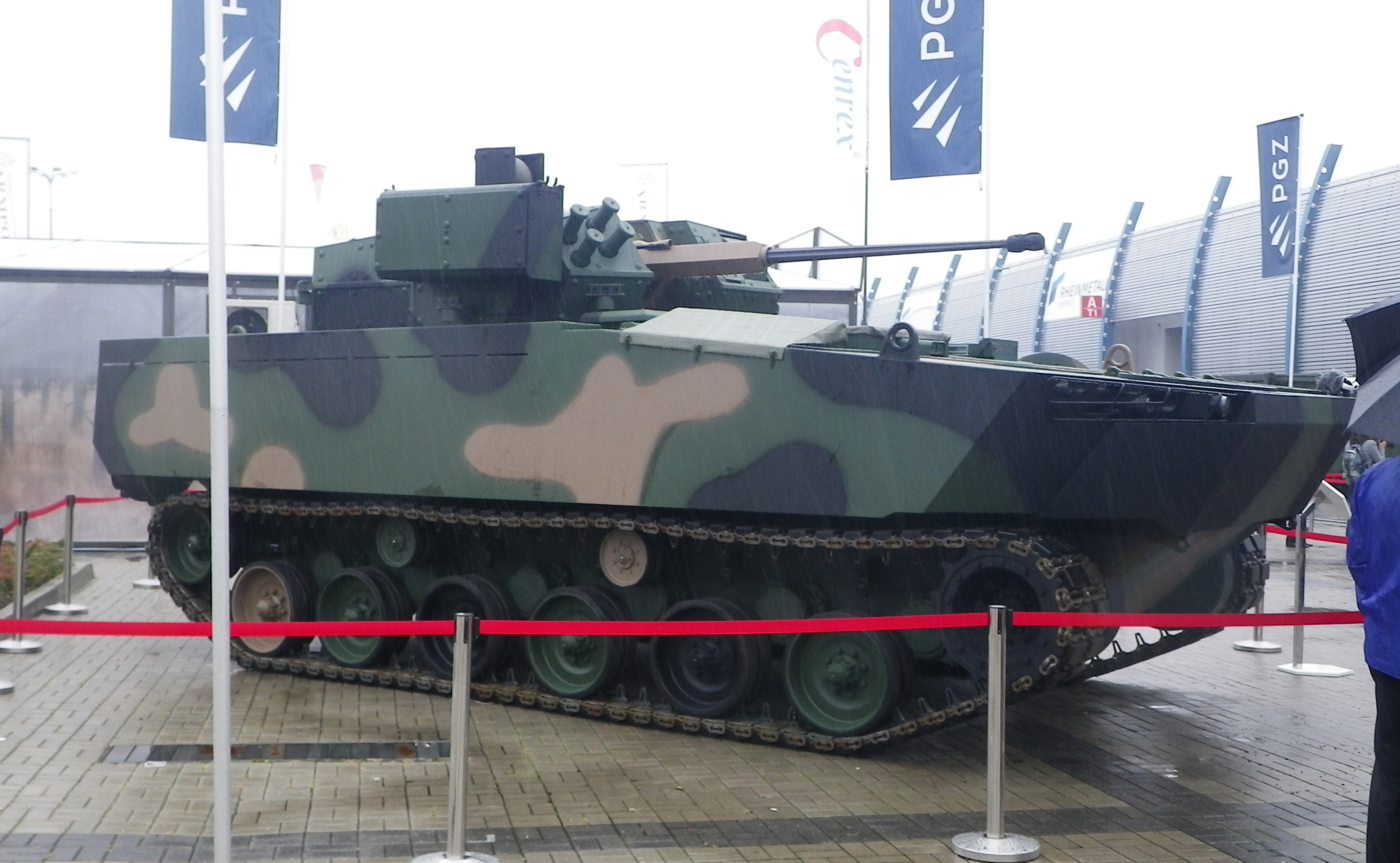
First demonstrator of the Borsuk, MSPO 2017

The Borsuk IFV emerged from NBPWP Borsuk (Nowy Bojowy, Pływający Wóz Piechoty Borsuk - "New Infantry Amphibious Fighting Vehicle Borsuk") development program initiated in October 2014, when a contract was signed between the NCBR and a consortium consisting of Huta Stalowa Wola S.A. (leader), Ośrodek Badawczo-Rozwojowy Urządzeń Mechanicznych OBRUM Sp. z o.o., Rosomak S.A., Wojskowe Zakłady Elektroniczne S.A., Wojskowe Zakłady Inżynieryjne S.A. (currently HSW), Wojskowe Zakłady Motoryzacyjne S.A., National Defense University (currently War Studies University), Military University of Technology, Wojskowy Instytut Techniki Pancernej i Samochodowej and Warsaw University of Technology aiming at the development of a new IFV. The value of the contract was 75 million PLN (22.6 USD). 62 million PLN (18.68 million USD) was a grant from the NCBR.

The vehicle is equipped with the ZSSW-30 unmanned turret developed under its own program by a consortium of HSW and WB Group.

The first technology demonstrator of the new Borsuk IFV was unveiled at the MSPO 2017 exhibition with a more refined version being shown a year later. The 2018 variant differed from the original demonstrator by having side skirts, appliqué armor on the sides and composite rubber tracks (CRT) instead of steel link ones.

In 2018 the prototype underwent its first set of factory trials which resulted in introduction of additional upgrades. The new version presented in 2019 at MSPO exhibition had redesigned trim vane (it now rises from the top of the hull instead of the front as before), new headlights, different add-on armor and mounting points for mobile multispectral camouflage.

In September 2020 the prototype successfully completed a series of extensive military hands-on trials conducted at Drawsko Training Ground (including a set of firing tests). Preparation of the technical documentation of the vehicle for future production begun at the same time.

Construction of four additional prototypes was commissioned by NCBR in April 2022, which raised the development cost to 262.06 million PLN, of which 242.2 million PLN (58.7 and 54.3 million USD respectively at the exchange rate at that time) was financed by NCBR.

In November 2022 presentation and familiarization tests of Borsuk took place at the Orzysz Training Ground. They were witnessed by Polish Minister of National Defense Mariusz Błaszczak, HSW officials and the media. During the presentation it was announced that the qualification trials are expected to be completed by mid-2023 and that the 16th Mechanised Division will be the first recipient of the new vehicle. The same announcement also suggested that other types of ATGMs will be integrated with the ZSSW-30 turret and that the Borsuk's chassis will become a base for additional specialized vehicles.

On February 28, 2023, the Armaments Agency (the procurement agency of the Polish MoD) signed a framework agreement with Huta Stalowa Wola for the delivery of 1,000 Borsuk IFVs and 400 auxiliary variants based the same chassis. Among those variants are combat reconnaissance vehicle, command vehicle, armored recovery vehicle, MEDEVAC vehicle, and NBC reconnnaissance vehicle. In this manner Borsuk will become a new fighting platform for the Polish Armed Forces and thus, in the Polish sources, is now often referred to as UMPG (Uniwersalna Modułowa Platforma Gąsienicowa - Universal Modular Tracked Platform, not to be confused with the Anders platform also referred to as UMPG).

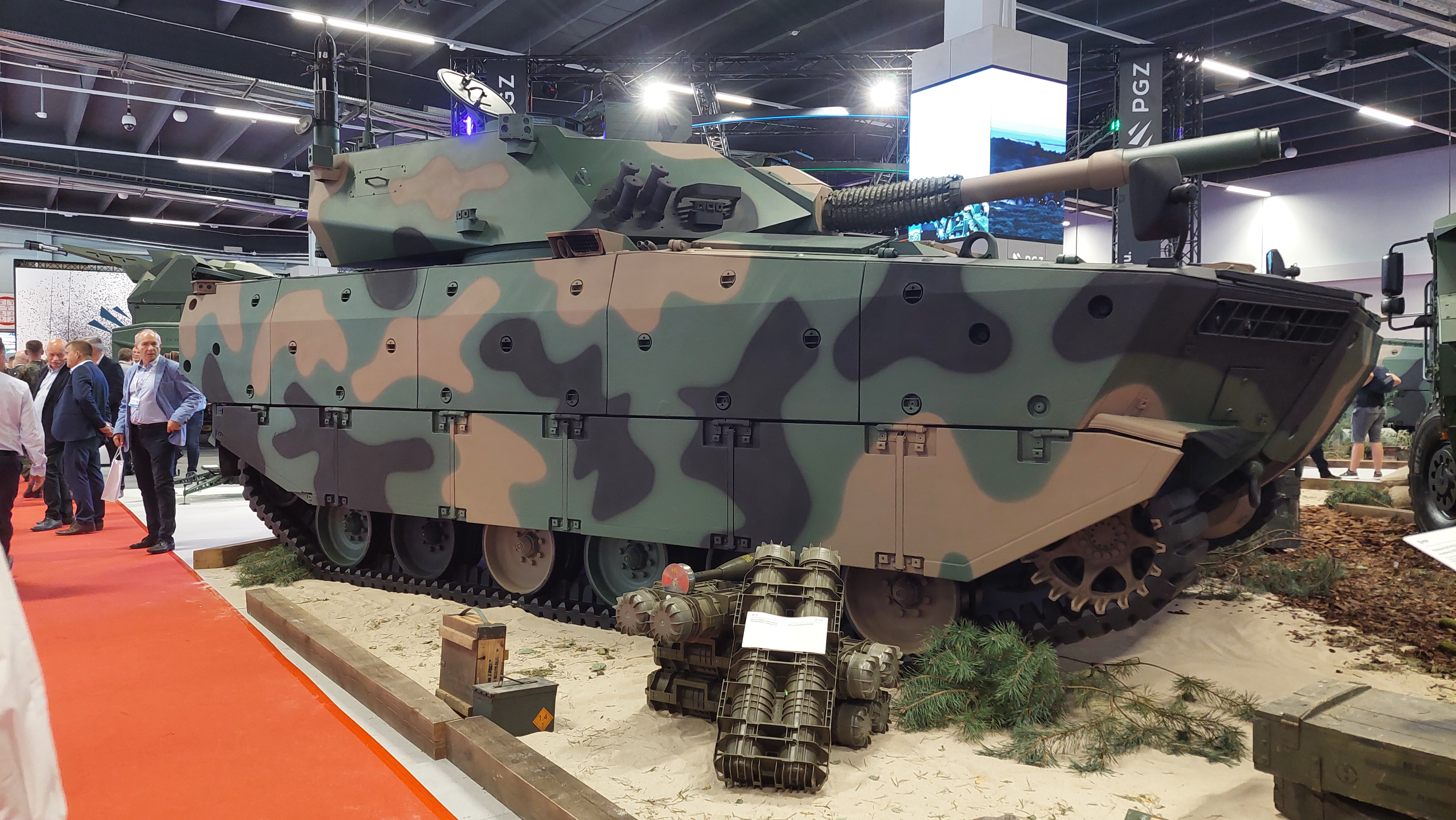
Self-propelled mortar variant with the M69 turret

According to the information provided by Col. Piotr Paluch during the meeting of the Standing Subcommittee for the Polish Defense Industry and Technical Modernization of the Polish Armed Forces (Podkomisja Stała do Spraw Polskiego Przemysłu Obronnego oraz Modernizacji Technicznej Sił Zbrojnych Rzeczypospolitej Polskiej, or OBN05S in short) which took place on July 6, 2023, the price of the Borsuk prototype with the ZSSW-30 turret was estimated at 36 million PLN (around 9.2 million USD at the time) as of 2020. The first IFVs are expected to be delivered in 2024, auxiliary vehicles in 2026 and the whole program is to be completed by 2035. There are also plans to acquire an engine from another supplier for the Borsuk.

Two vehicles based on the Borsuk chassis were presented at MSPO 2024 - the base IFV variant as well as the first specialized vehicle, a self-propelled mortar fitted with a technology demonstrator of the new M69 Rak turret. The mortar variant retains the amphibious capability of the base chassis.

On March 27, 2025, the first executive contract was signed between the Armaments Agency and PGZ, for the delivery of 111 Borsuk IFVs for the price of 6.5 billion PLN (1.67 billion USD at the time), which includes 106 newly built vehicles and 5 prototypes rebuilt to the serial production standard. The deliveries are to take place from 2025 to 2029. A contract for a further 146 Borsuk IFVs to be delivered by 2030 was signed on May 30, 2026, bringing the total ordered to 257 vehicles.

On 4 December 2025, PGZ announced the delivery of the first 15 serial-production Borsuk IFVs to the Polish Armed Forces.

3-view drawing of the Borsuk

=== Future ===
The chassis of the Borsuk IFV is meant to become a base for a whole family of combat and auxiliary vehicles. The planned variants include:

- Borsuk - the base variant, an infantry fighting vehicle equipped with the ZSSW-30 turret.
- Oset - command vehicle, supposed to be based on a chassis variant with a raised superstructure.
- Żuk - reconnaissance vehicle.
- Gekon - armored recovery vehicle.
- Ares - NBC reconnaissance vehicle.
- Rak - 120mm self-propelled mortar. A demonstrator of such vehicle has been presented at MSPO 2024, fitted with a new M69 turret.
- Gotem - medical evacuation vehicle.
- Jodła GTRI - Gąsienicowy Transporter Rozpoznania Inżynieryjnego, lit. tracked engineering reconnaissance transporter.
- Jodła GTWI - Gąsienicowy Transporter Wojsk Inżynieryjnych, lit. tracked engineering transporter.
- Jodła TMN - Transporter Minowania Narzutowego, lit. mine-scattering transporter. Meant to replace the IMS Kroton, its mine-scattering system will likely be based on that of the Baobab-K.
- Jodła PTI - Pływający Transporter Inżynieryjny, lit. amphibious engineering transporter. Will replace the PTS-M, likely to be a completely new hull using Borsuk components.

The variants named Jodła (meaning a fir tree) are meant to be based on a larger, amphibious chassis resembling the PTS-M transporter that will use many of the Borsuk components. HSW is working on such a vehicle, designated PTG (Pływający Transporter Gąsienicowy, Tracked Amphibious Transporter), which is meant to weigh 26 tonnes and have a carrying capacity of 16 tonnes. Such a vehicle would fulfill the main requirement for the Jodła PTI program, that is being able to transport a Jelcz 442.32 truck which has a GVW of 15.6 tonnes.

HSW is also working on a different powerpack version of the Borsuk, with a Cummins engine instead of the current MTU ones.

== Description ==
=== Mobility ===
Borsuk prototypes are fitted with a powerpack consisting of a 720 hp (530 kW) MTU 8V199 TE20 turbo diesel engine which drives a Perkins X300 automatic transmission. This allows the vehicle to reach speeds of up to 65 km/h on the road and 8 km/h in the water. The production vehicles will feature the same engine and a newer 3040 MX transmission from Allison. Both transmissions have four forward and two reverse gears.

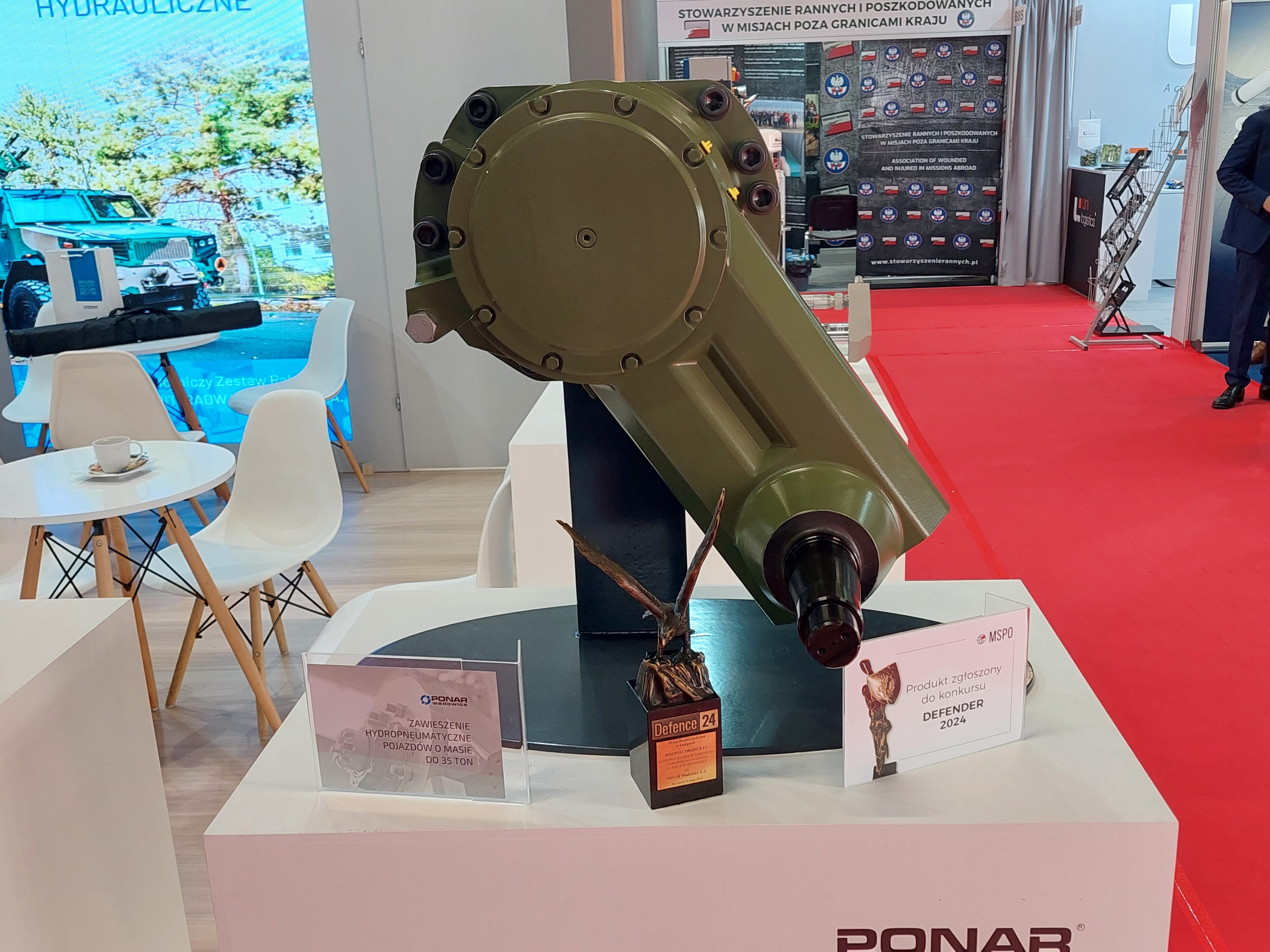
Ponar WHP35 suspension unit

The running gear consists of six dual rubber-lined road wheels, with two return rollers on each side. The suspension is hydropneumatic, with the first prototypes equipped with the Horstman InArm units while the newer ones are fitted with WHP35 units designed by Ponar Wadowice, which are also meant to be used in production vehicles. The maximum weight of the Borsuk fitted with InArm suspension is 33 tonnes, while with the WHP35 it's 35 tonnes. Borsuk is able to use either steel or Soucy Defense's composite rubber tracks (CRT), with CRTs being preferred by the military.

The vehicle is fully amphibious without any special preparations - crossing a body of water only requires raising the trim vane (which can be done from the driver seat without the necessity of leaving the vehicle). In the water Borsuk is propelled by two water jets with rotating nozzles that provide steering capability.

=== Armament ===
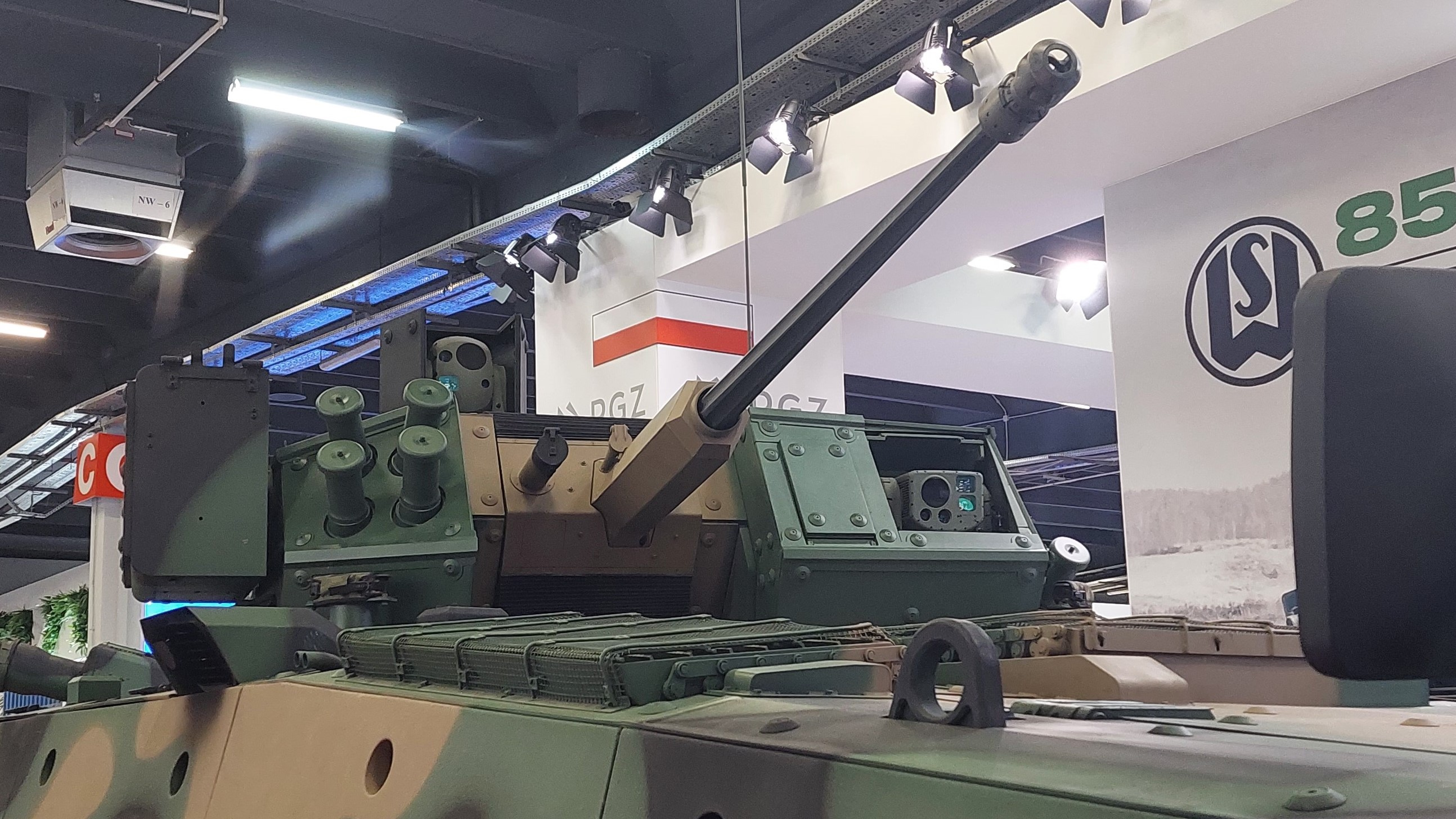
ZSSW-30 turret mounted on the Borsuk IFV; MSPO 23 defense expo.

==== ZSSW-30 ====
Borsuk is fitted with the ZSSW-30 remote control turret armed with the 30 mm Mk44S Bushmaster II chain gun and a coaxial 7.62 mm UKM-2000C machine gun. The turret also features two Spike-LR anti-tank guided missiles in a launch container mounted on its right side. The ZSSW-30 provides 200 autocannon rounds in two ammo racks, one for 120 and the other for 80 rounds, as well as 400 machine gun rounds in ready to use mode.

Use of a separate ATGM launch container, as opposed to other systems where launcher extends directly from an internal compartment of the turret, has some advantages. Among those are separation of the missiles from the rest of the turret (and thus greater safety of the crew and the turret itself) and ability to quickly replace damaged or destroyed container while in the field. Both the autocannon and the machine gun can be reloaded and operated from the inside of the turret. The ATGMs can be reloaded from a hatch in the rear of the vehicle without the necessity for the crew to leave the vehicle (in the same manner as in the Bradley IFV).

The autocannon fires at a rate of 200 RPM for standard ammunition, and 120 RPM for ABM. It has elevation angles extending from -9° to +60°. The ATGMs can hit armour at ranges from 200 meters to 4 kilometers when guided manually, and up to 4.5 kilometers when in the fire and forget mode.

=== Protection ===
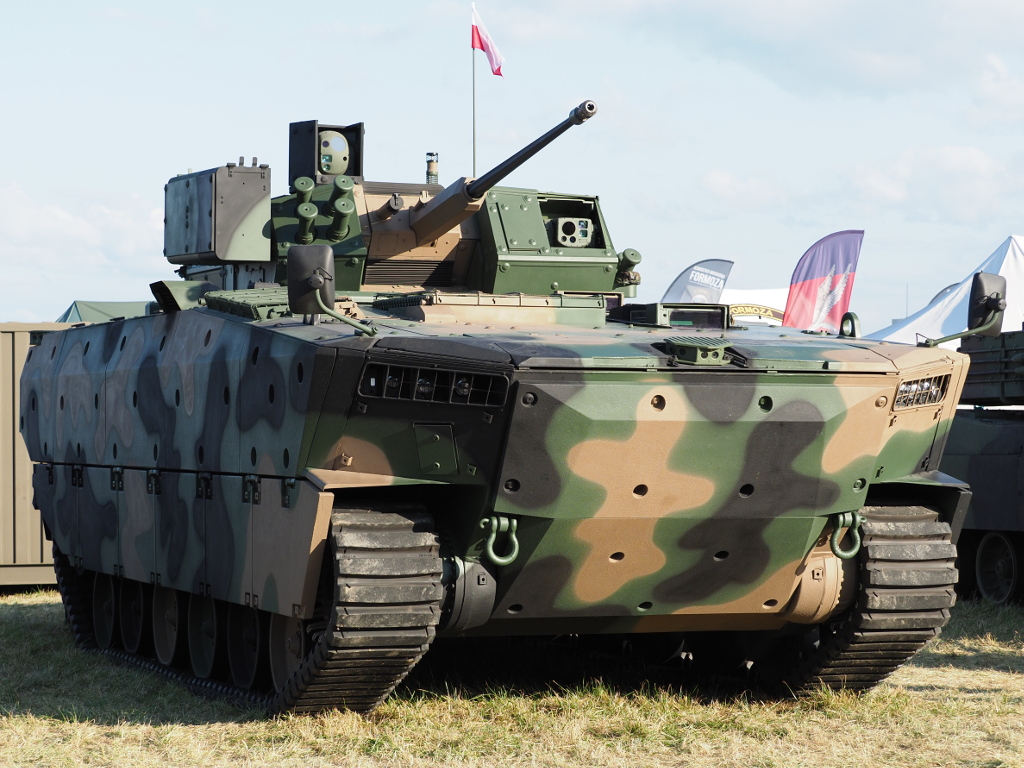
Borsuk with rubber tracks and a frontal appliqué armor plate, NATO Days 2023

==== Chassis ====
Borsuk's chassis is made out of welded Armox 500T steel plates of varying thickness arranged in such a way that they can function as spaced armor. This, according to official sources, gives the chassis STANAG 4569 level IV protection from the front and level III protection from the sides and the rear against ballistic threats, as well as level IIIa and IIIb against mine blasts. Unofficial sources claim that Borsuk could be even better armored, with its chassis being able to stop Russian 30mm 3UBR6 and 3U8R8 rounds from the frontal arc (±30° from the centerline) and 12.7mm and 14.5mm from the sides, even though the latter type may cause some damage to the engine block. The chassis can be up-armored as it's fitted with mounting points on the front and sides. While the side panels are fitted on since 2018, a front armor plate was first shown in the spring of 2023.

==== Turret ====
The armor protection of the ZSSW-30 turret is not disclosed by the manufacturer, but according to unofficial sources, the armour consists of a thin layer of polyethylene fabric sandwiched between two steel plates and an additional piece of ceramic composite armour (two steel plates with alumina tiles in between) on the ATGM container. This provides level III protection for both the main structure and the missile container as well as level II protection for external parts like the commander sight. ZSSW-30 also has mounting points for add-on armor plates or camouflage nets.

==== Active protection ====
In addition to armor, Borsuk is protected by the Obra-3 soft kill active protection system. This system consists of four laser detector sets (each one consisting of three detectors), a control unit and eight smoke grenade dischargers. The detectors work in 360° azimuth and in an elevation ranging from -6° to +30° and can detect light in the wavelength spectrum ranging from 0.6 to 11 μm as well as distinguish between different laser sources, such as laser rangefinders or laser designators. Obra-3 can work in different modes: manual, semi-automatic and automatic. In the automatic mode the grenades are launched automatically into the specific path an incoming laser beam (immediately after the turret is rotated in this direction, which is also done automatically). The system uses GAk-81 phosphorus multispectral smoke grenades.

=== Situational awareness ===
==== Sensors ====
The driver of the Borsuk has access to three periscopes mounted in the hatch: a bigger one mounted centrally and two smaller ones mounted to the sides. When the trim vane is extended, it obstructs the view from the driver's periscopes, so a camera is mounted on a trim vane to provide vision for the driver when crossing water obstacles.

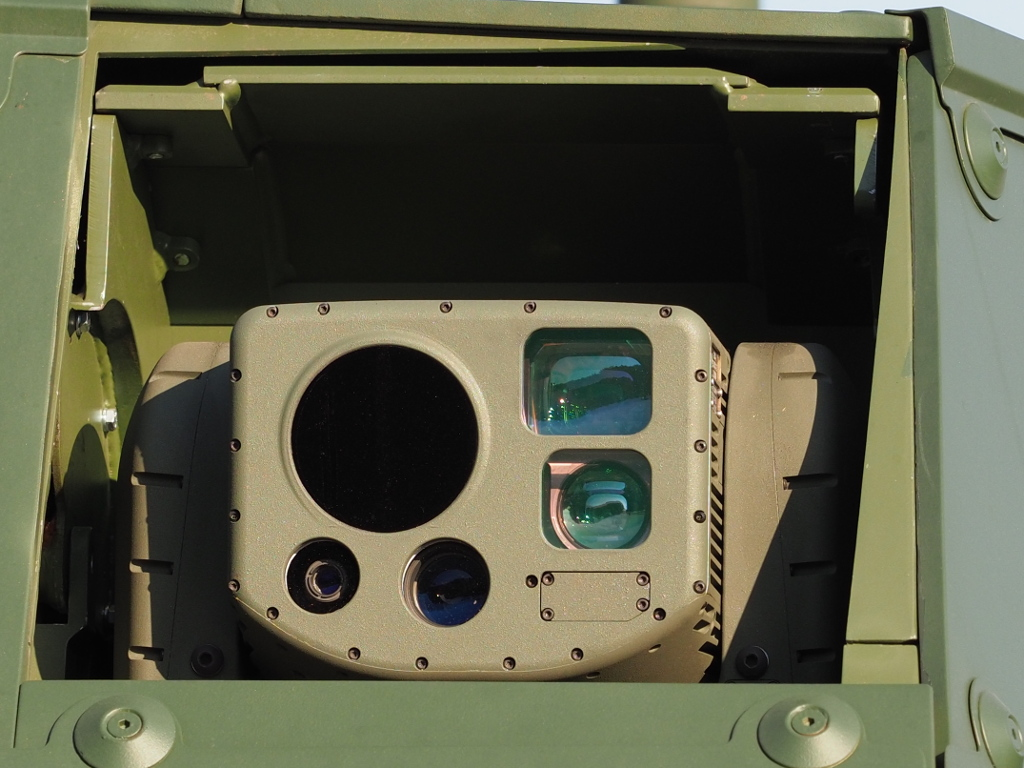
GOC-1 Nike gunner sight

The vehicle is also equipped with the SOD (System Obserwacji Dookrężnej) omnidirectional observation system designed by WZE which consists of three camera modules (each with three daytime and three night vision cameras), image processing module, control computer and displays for the dismount compartment. It is integrated with the turret's FCS and allows both the crew and the dismounts to see the vehicle's surroundings. In the future the SOD system can be integrated with AR goggles for the crew and AI algorithms for faster classification of surrounding objects.

The ZSSW-30 turret is equipped with the GOD-1 Iris sight for the commander and GOC-1 Nike sight for the gunner, both of which are integrated into the turret's fire control system and consist of a laser rangefinder as well as daytime and thermal optical channels. The commander's sight is mounted on top of the turret in an armored cover and provides 360° field of view with elevation angles from -20° to 60°, and the gunners sight provides elevation angles from -10° to 60° and is mounted on the left side of the turret and can be covered by an armored door. Both are equipped with an eye-safe laser rangefinder and two optical channels: daytime, with a light intensity sensor and thermal.

The turret is also fitted with an auxiliary optical sight which is not integrated with the FCS and is meant to be used in emergency situations from inside of the turret. It is located to the right of the gunner's primary sight behind an armored cover.

==== Fire control system ====
The ZSSW-30 fire control system made by WB Group provides full hunter-killer and killer-killer capabilities as well as superb accuracy when firing at moving targets from both moving and standing position. The fire control system allows for shooting in every position of the turret relative to the hull in all three axes (which is not a common feature for other comparable systems). The entire firing process is highly automated as both the gunner and the commander have an auto-tracker integrated into the FCS. The ZSSW-30 FCS is net-centric as it can transfer and coordinate information between different turrets as well as communicate with various types of UAVs. Both of those features greatly increase situational awareness and combat effectiveness of each and every vehicle.

== Variants ==
- Oset - command vehicle, supposed to be based on a chassis variant with a raised superstructure.
- Żuk - reconnaissance vehicle.
- Gekon - armored recovery vehicle.
- Ares - NBC reconnaissance vehicle.
- Rak - 120mm self-propelled mortar.
- Gotem - medical evacuation vehicle.
- Jodła GTRI - Gąsienicowy Transporter Rozpoznania Inżynieryjnego, lit. tracked engineering reconnaissance transporter.
- Jodła GTWI - Gąsienicowy Transporter Wojsk Inżynieryjnych, lit. tracked engineering transporter.
- Jodła TMN - Transporter Minowania Narzutowego, lit. mine-scattering transporter.
- Jodła PTI - Pływający Transporter Inżynieryjny, lit. amphibious engineering transporter.

== Operators ==
=== Orders ===
Poland (257 ordered + 5 prototypes)
1355 vehicles are to be acquired according to the 2023 framework agreement, specifically 1014 IFVs and 341 different auxiliary vehicles.
Firm orders:
- 111 IFV ordered on March 27th, 2025, the deliveries are to take place by 2029. Together with the 5 prototypes already in service with the 15th Mechanized Brigade, these vehicles will equip both of the brigade's mechanized battalions (58 IFV per battalion).
- 146 IFV ordered on May 30th, 2026 (7.5 billion Polish zloty).

=== Potential operators ===
Brazil
As part of its VBC Fuz programme the Brazilian army is looking at procuring 78 tracked infantry fighting vehicles. Among the potential vehicles are the BWP Borsuk, the CV90 and others.

=== Failed bids ===
Romania
Romania had a budget of $3.3 billion for 298 infantry fighting vehicles. According to local observers and public information, the potential candidates included the ASCOD 2, the Hanwha K-21 Redback, and the Rheinmetall KF-41 Lynx, and BAE Systems offered the AMPV with a CV90 turret. The Borsuk was presented by PGZ to the Romanian Army in September 2024.
Romania selected the KF41 Lynx, and signed the contract in May 2026.

== See also ==
=== Comparable vehicles ===
- ASCOD – (Spain, Austria)
  - ASCOD 2 – (Austria, Spain)
    - Ajax – (United Kingdom)
- M2 Bradley – (United States)
- CV-90 – (Sweden)
- Dardo – (Italy)
- Puma – (Germany)
- Lynx (Rheinmetall armoured fighting vehicle) – (Germany)
- K21 – (South Korea)
- Hunter AFV – (Singapore)
- Tulpar (IFV) – (Turkey)
- Type 89 – (Japan)
- Makran – (Iran)
- ZBD-04 – (China)
- Lazika – (Georgia)
- BMP-3 – (Soviet Union, Russia)
