= Makran IFV =

Iranian infantry fighting vehicle

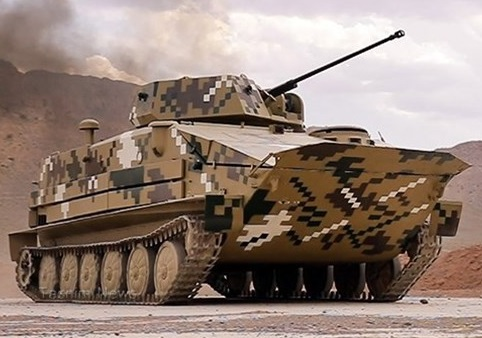
- Type: Infantry fighting vehicle
- Place of origin: Iran

Service history
- In service: 2020–present
- Used by: Iran

Production history
- Manufacturer: Islamic Revolutionary Guards Corps Research and Self-Sufficiency Jihad Organization
- Produced: 2020–present

Specifications
- Length: 7.12 meters
- Width: 3.17 meters
- Height: 2.39 meters
- Crew: 3
- Passengers: 9–12
- Main armament: 30mm Shipunov 2A42 auto-cannon
- Secondary armament: 7.62mm PKT coaxial machine gun
- Engine: diesel
- Suspension: torsion bar
- Maximum speed: Estimated between 44 and 80 km/h (Land); 11km/h (Water)

The Makran IFV is an Iranian infantry fighting vehicle (IFV), a highly modernized and upsized copy of the BTR-50 APC. The vehicle is produced and designed by the Research and Self-Sufficiency Jihad Organization. It was unveiled in June 2020 by the Islamic Revolutionary Guard Corps. The vehicle is named after the Makran coastal region, a region that stretches between Iran and Pakistan.

== History ==
=== Origins ===
During the period of the Shah, Iran purchased and received around 300 BTR-50's, and during the Iran–Iraq War hundreds were captured. While only 150-270 are estimated to be in service, hundreds are currently in storage, and a couple were given to the Popular Mobilization Forces. The IRGC realized after the Iran–Iraq War, that the BTR-50s and BTR-60s it had needed more armour and firepower, leading to the development of the Makran, Heidar-6, and Heidar-7. The Sedad, a BTR-60PB with an unmanned ZU-23-2 was developed as a temporary solution.

=== Development ===
A tour of an IRGC run upgrade facility by Tasnim News Agency appears to show some of the captured BTR-50s and MT-LBs currently in storage, with Raad unmanned turrets being produced in the factory. Videos posted on YouTube in 2021 appear to show an unpainted prototype moving through water. Another prototype or in-completed Makran was seen in the same Tasnim News Agency video tour, which only had the unmanned turret and side armor upgrades; it was painted in grey and tan, with some unpainted parts.

In June 2020, the vehicle was displayed for the first time, alongside an upgraded T-72M dubbed "Rakhsh" and a heavily upgraded BTR-60 dubbed "Heidar-7".

== Design ==
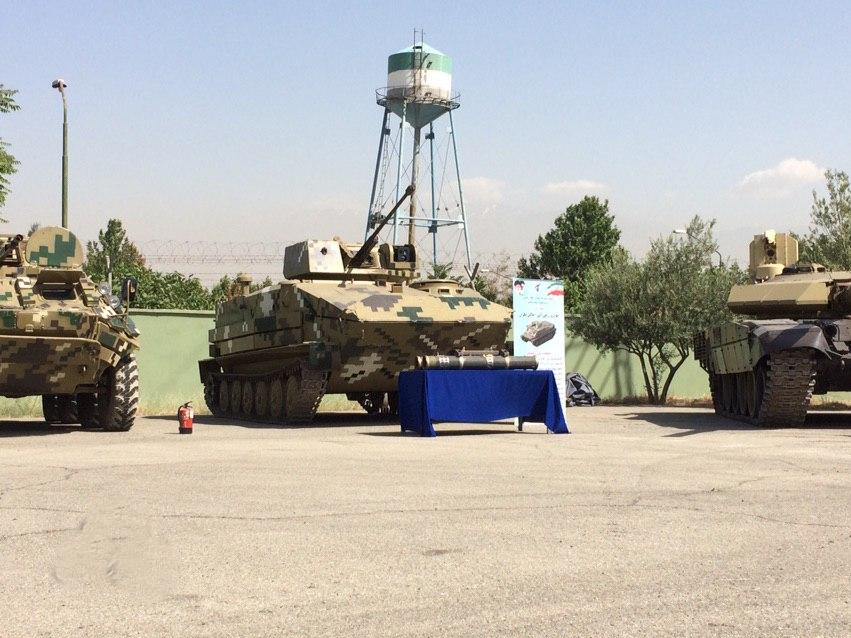
A Makran IFV in 2020 as photographed by Fars News Agency

=== Design and upgrades ===
The Makran has been so heavily upgraded that one may not be able to notice the BTR-50 hull. The IFV has upgraded hull modifications: a newly welded frontal armor plate, thicker side armor, and thicker floor plating. It also has a new unmanned turret called "Raad-2", armed with a Shipunov 2A42 30mm automatic cannon and a 7.62mm coaxial machine gun. The "Raad" unmanned turret contains a brand new fire-control system, a thermal-imaging sensor, night-vision cameras, a laser range finder, 3-6 smoke canister launchers, and is controlled via a display panel in the hull. The laser range finder has a range of 10,000 meters, and the thermal-imaging sensor has a range of 4,000 meters. The vehicle stores 500 rounds of 30mm ammunition for the Shipunov 2A42 auto-cannon, and 2000 rounds of 7.62mm ammunition for the coaxial machine gun. The vehicle's driver also has a new cupola and periscope, to fit with the newly molded frontal armor.

=== Missile capabilities ===
Images show two anti-tank guided missiles on display next to the Makran, which may imply that the Makran can carry anti-tank guided missiles. Some Iranian sources have also reported that the vehicles can fire "missiles". Reports from GlobalSecurity and various Russian news agencies say it is possible to install ATGMs onto the vehicle, and is an option for purchasers. The ATGMs may be the Almaz anti-tank guided missile, which is believed by an anonymous "military technology analyst" on Twitter to have been developed from an Israeli Spike ATGM left behind in the 2006 Lebanon War. Iranian sources report that the ATGMs displayed may be the Toophan instead, another Iranian SACLOS anti-tank guided missile. However, closer up photos clearly show a Sadid-1 anti-tank guided missile launcher identical to those on Iranian helicopters.

=== Misconceptions ===
Some have claimed, be that incorrectly, that the Makran's turret is that of a BMP-2. However the two differentiate in size, looks, capability, structure, and adaptability. The reasoning behind an unmanned turret is to increase crew survivability and adaptability, not to increase ammunition storage.

== Operators ==
=== Current operators ===
- Iran Islamic Revolutionary Guard Corps

== See also ==
=== Vehicles of comparable role, performance and era ===
- M2 Bradley – (United States)
- Bradley Fighting Vehicle – (United States)
- General Dynamics Ajax – (United Kingdom)
- BMP-3 – (Soviet Union, Russia)
- Kurganets-25 – (Russia)
- ZBD-04 – (China)
- Type-89 – (Japan)
- K21 – (South Korea)
- K200 KIFV – (South Korea)
- Puma IFV – (Germany)
- Lynx IFV – (Germany)
- Bionix AFV – (Singapore)
- Dardo IFV – (Italy)
- Abhay IFV – (India)
- ELVO Kentaurus – (Greece)
- WPB Anders – (Poland)
- Tulpar IFV – (Turkey)
- ASCOD – (Spain, Austria)
- CV90 – (Sweden)
