= Hunter AFV =

Singaporean armoured fighting vehicle

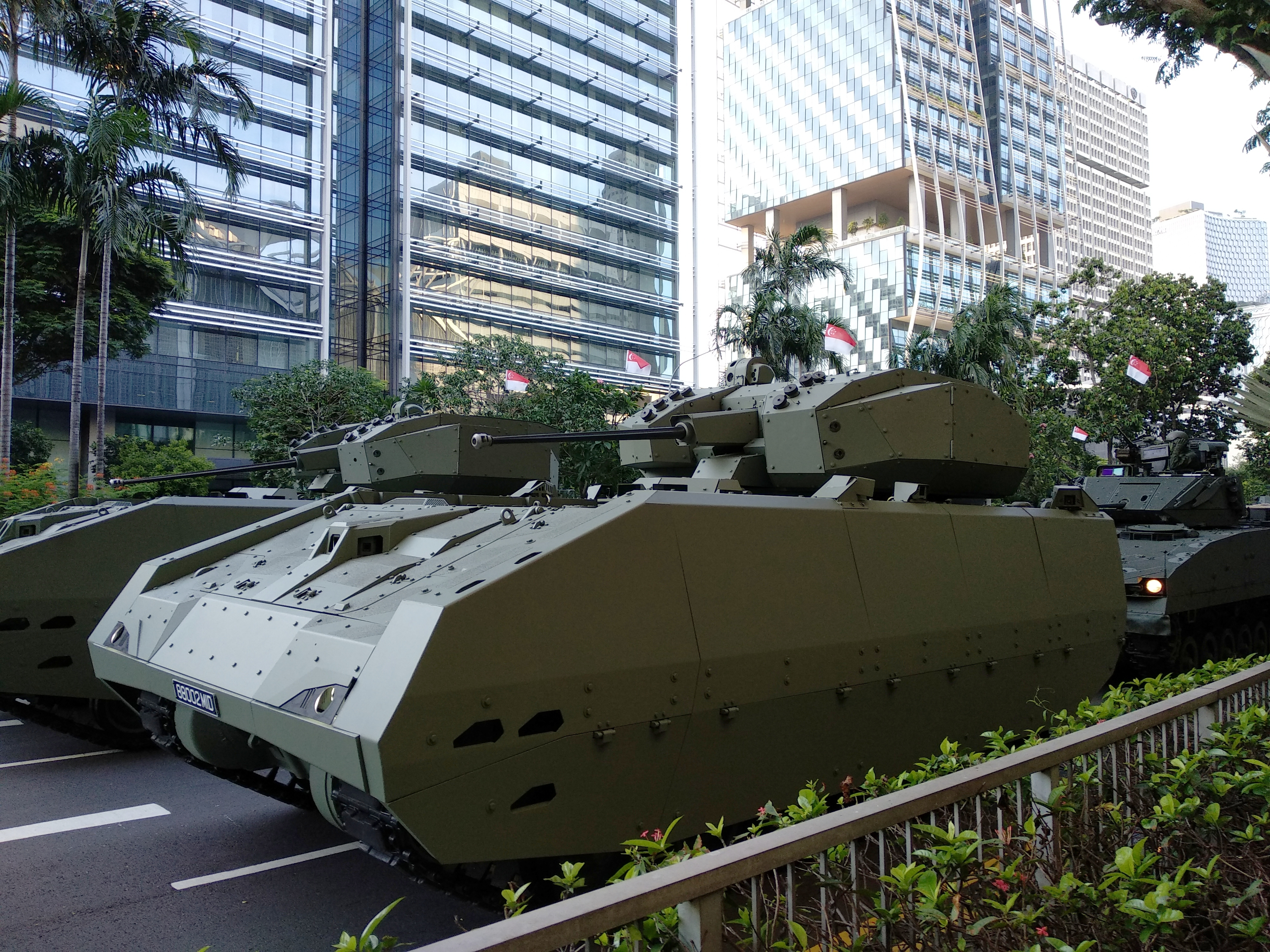
- Type: Armoured fighting vehicle
- Place of origin: Singapore

Service history
- In service: 2019 – present
- Used by: Singapore Army

Production history
- Designer: ST Engineering; Defence Science and Technology Agency; Singapore Army
- Designed: 2006
- Manufacturer: ST Engineering Land Systems
- Produced: 2019 – present

Specifications
- Mass: Combat weight: 29.5 tonnes (32.5 short tons; 29.0 long tons)
- Length: 6.9 metres (22 ft 8 in)
- Width: 3.4 m (11 ft 2 in)
- Height: 3.4 m (11 ft 2 in)
- Crew: 3 (commander, gunner, driver) plus 8 fully-equipped combat troops
- Main armament: Mk44 Bushmaster II 30 mm cannon in Samson Remote Controlled Weapon Station, Spike ATGM
- Secondary armament: 7.62×51mm NATO coaxial MG, 8 x 76 mm smoke grenade launchers
- Engine: MTU 8V-199 TE20 turbo-diesel 720 hp (530 kW)
- Power/weight: 24 hp/tonne
- Transmission: HMX3000 hydro-mechanical infinitely variable transmission
- Operational range: 500 km (310 mi)
- Maximum speed: 70 km/h (43 mph)

The Hunter Armoured Fighting Vehicle (or Hunter AFV in short) is a tracked Singaporean armoured fighting vehicle jointly developed by ST Engineering, Defence Science and Technology Agency, and the Singapore Army. Intended to replace the Singapore Army's aging M113 Ultra armoured personnel carriers, it was commissioned in 2019. It is the Singapore Army's and the world's first fully digitalised platform, and is designed to provide armoured forces with enhanced capabilities to operate more effectively and efficiently in various phases of military operations. It was formerly known as ST Kinetics Next Generation Armoured Fighting Vehicle (NGAFV).

== History ==
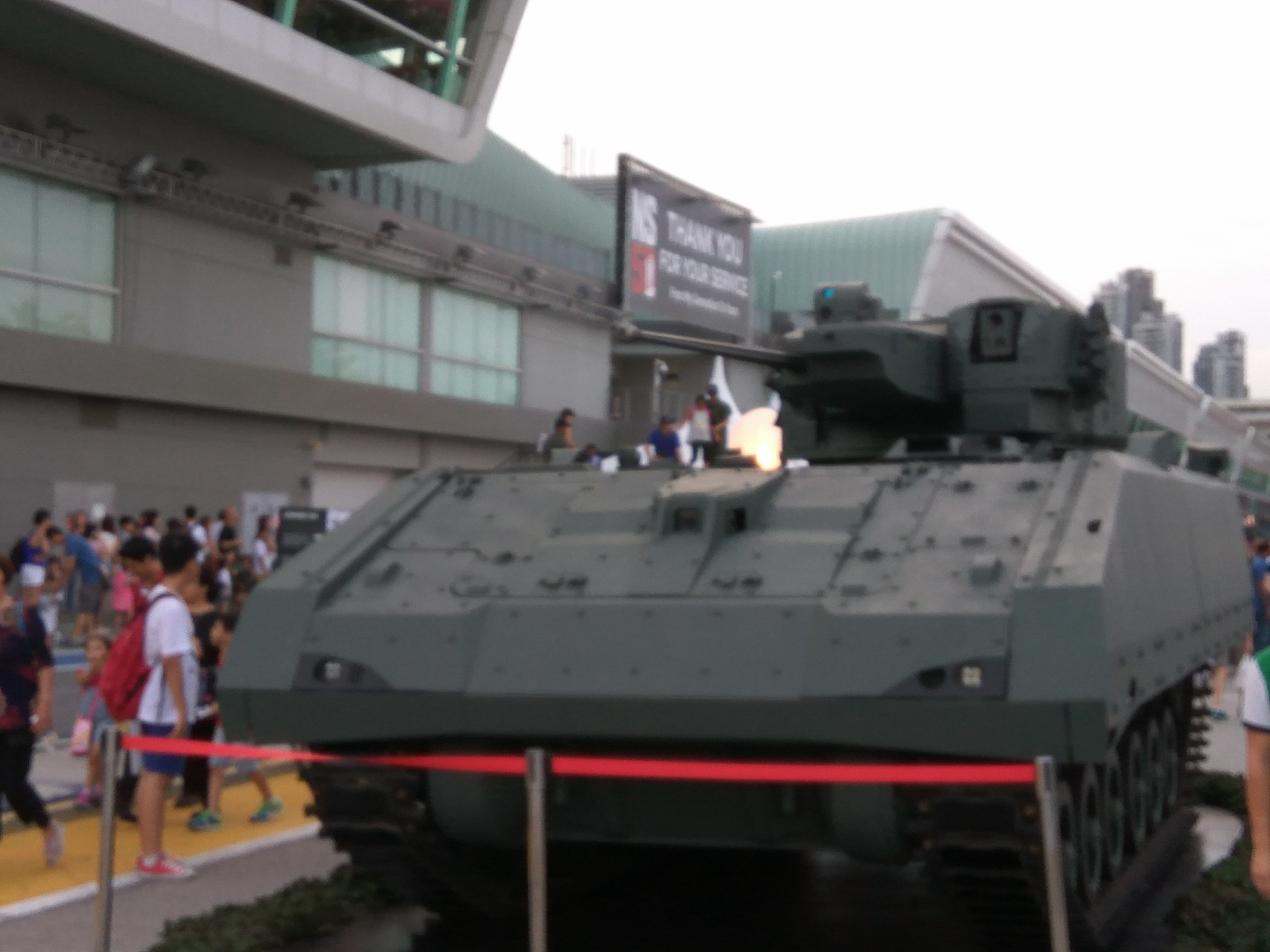
NGAFV at SAF Army Open House 2017

Development of the Hunter started in 2006 as a project of the Singaporean Ministry of Defence (MINDEF)'s Defence Science and Technology Agency (DSTA).

In March 2017, Singapore Technologies Engineering Ltd (ST Engineering) announced that its land systems arm, Singapore Technologies Kinetics Ltd (ST Kinetics), had been awarded a contract by MINDEF for the production and supply of the Next Generation Armoured Fighting Vehicle (NGAFV).

The NGAFV would replace the Ultra M113 AFV as a key component of the Singapore Armed Forces’ mechanized forces which has been in service with the Singapore Army since the early 70s. Delivery of the Hunter began in 2019. The vehicle would be delivered in troop carrier, command and recovery variants.

The prototype model was exhibited at the Singapore Airshow in 2018.

In June 2019, the Hunter AFV was commissioned for the Singapore Army, with the 42nd Battalion, Singapore Armoured Regiment designated as the inaugural armour battle group operating the new platform. The first armour battle group operating the platform was announced operationally ready by March 2022. The armoured recovery vehicle variant of the Hunter platform was unveiled on 18 February 2022.

In September 2022, the Singapore Army successfully concluded the inaugural overseas live-firing for the Hunter AFV in Oberlausitz, Germany, during which the operational live-firing of the vehicle’s SPIKE-LR2 anti-tank guided missile was also successfully conducted.

On 9 November 2022, social media releases from Singapore's Defence Minister Ng Eng Hen and the Defence Science and Technology Agency (DSTA) confirmed the unveil and commissioning of the armoured vehicle-launched bridge (HT-AVLB) variant at the 55th anniversary event of the Singapore Combat Engineers. This variant is stated to progressively replace the armoured vehicle-launched bridges based on the SM-1 platform, the only variant of the AMX-13 that is still in service with the Singapore Army.

== Design ==
The vehicle has a tracked chassis and is crewed by a commander, a driver, and a gunner. The vehicle is equipped with an integrated combat cockpit, which allows the commander and gunner to use a common set of controls to operate the Hunter, and drive by wire capability, which allows the vehicle commander to take over driving functions from the driver without switching positions. The commander and gunner also have independent sights.

The Hunter has an MTU 8V-199 TE20 720 hp (530 kW) turbocharged diesel engine and an HMX3000 hydro-mechanical infinitely variable transmission.

It has in-arm hydropneumatic suspension provided by Horstman of the UK, now a subsidiary of Renk.

The AFV mounts an all-round surveillance system with a 360-degree field of vision, enabling closed-hatch operations, as well as a laser warning system.

The Hunter AFV is equipped with the Army Tactical Engagement and Information System (ARTEMIS), a command and control system that allows the crew to operate the vehicle in a fully digitised environment and enabling the wireless exchange of information between vehicles and formations. This is also integrated with the remote controlled weapon station to enable sharing of target information. It is also equipped with a Health and Utilisation Monitoring System (HUMS) to monitor the vehicle's health and allow predictive maintenance. The Hunter AFV has a remotely controlled Samson turret from Rafael armed with a 30 mm Mk44 Bushmaster II cannon, with a magazine for 200 30x173mm rounds, two SPIKE anti-tank guided missiles, a 7.62x51mm coaxial machine gun, and eight 76 mm smoke grenade launchers. It has a maximum range of 500 km and speed of 70 km/h.

== Variants ==
- Armoured fighting vehicle (30 mm cannon and 2 SPIKE-LR2 ATGM)
- Command vehicle
- Armoured recovery vehicle (Hunter ARV)
- Armoured engineer vehicle (Hunter AEV)
- Armoured vehicle-launched bridge (Hunter AVLB)

=== Mobile Protected Firepower programme prototype ===
A light tank variant of the Hunter AFV armed with Cockerill 3105 turret with 105 mm gun was offered for the United States Army's Mobile Protected Firepower programme in 2018, through a consortium between ST Engineering, Science Applications International Corporation (SAIC) and Cockerill Maintenance & Ingénierie. Successful vehicle trials were conducted at the Nevada Automotive Test Center in Nevada, United States.

The light tank was eventually rejected in favour of the offered vehicle by General Dynamics Land Systems (GDLS), which later became the M10 Booker. The programme was however announced as cancelled in May 2025 by the US Department of Defense, citing inability to meet operational requirements.

== Operators ==
=== Current operators ===
Singapore

- Singapore Army – 140 (classified quantity, but at least 140 units of MTU 8V199 engines were supplied from Germany for this vehicle)

=== Failed bids ===
United States

- Mobile Protected Firepower programme, 2018, in competition against General Dynamics Land Systems's Griffin II and BAE Systems's M8 Armoured Gun System. The former was selected in favour to become the M10 Booker, which however did not enter series production.

== Gallery ==
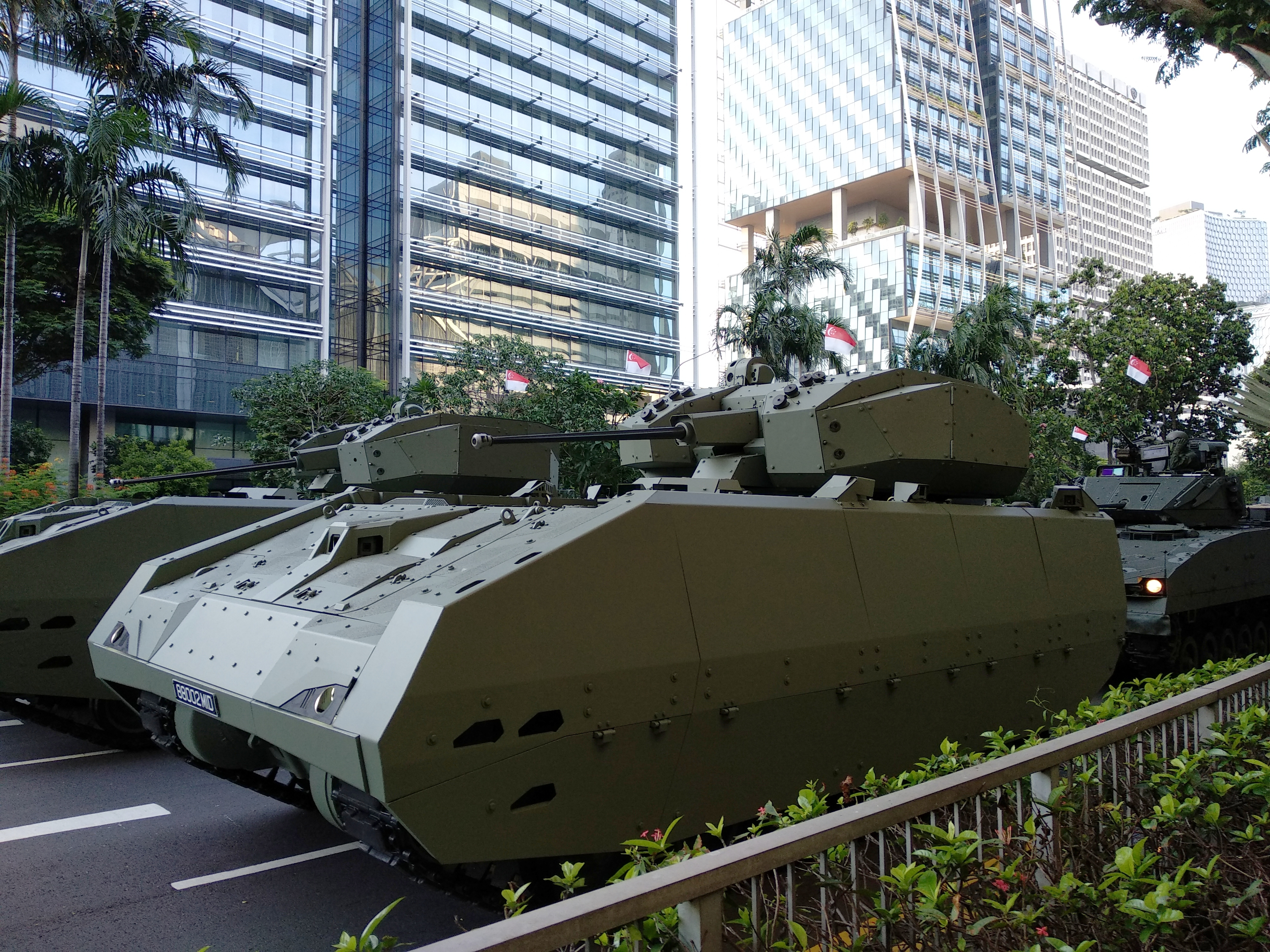
Hunter AFV of the Singapore Army at Singapore's National Day Parade rehearsal 2019

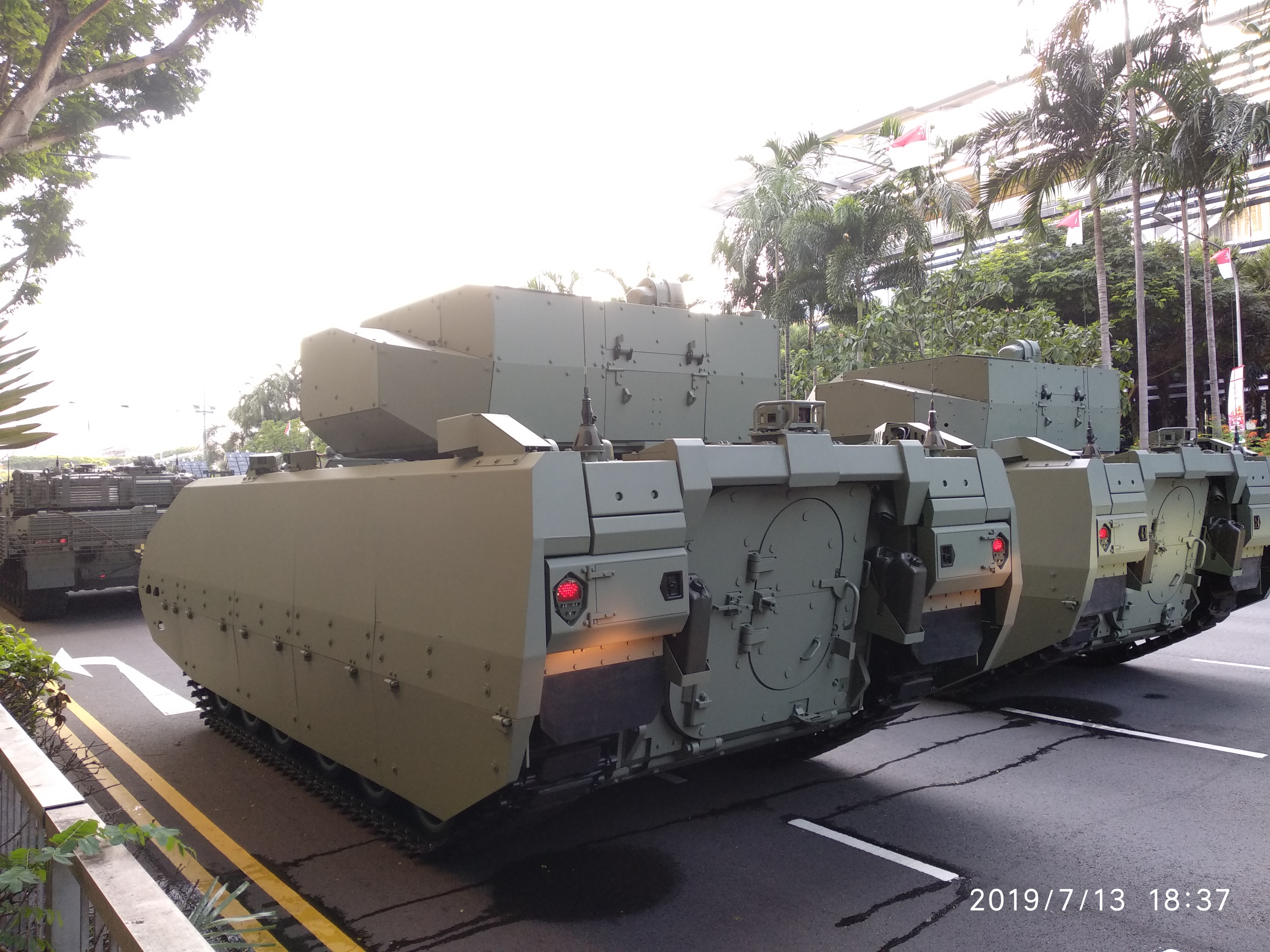
Rear view of production Hunter AFV at Singapore's National Day Parade rehearsal 2019

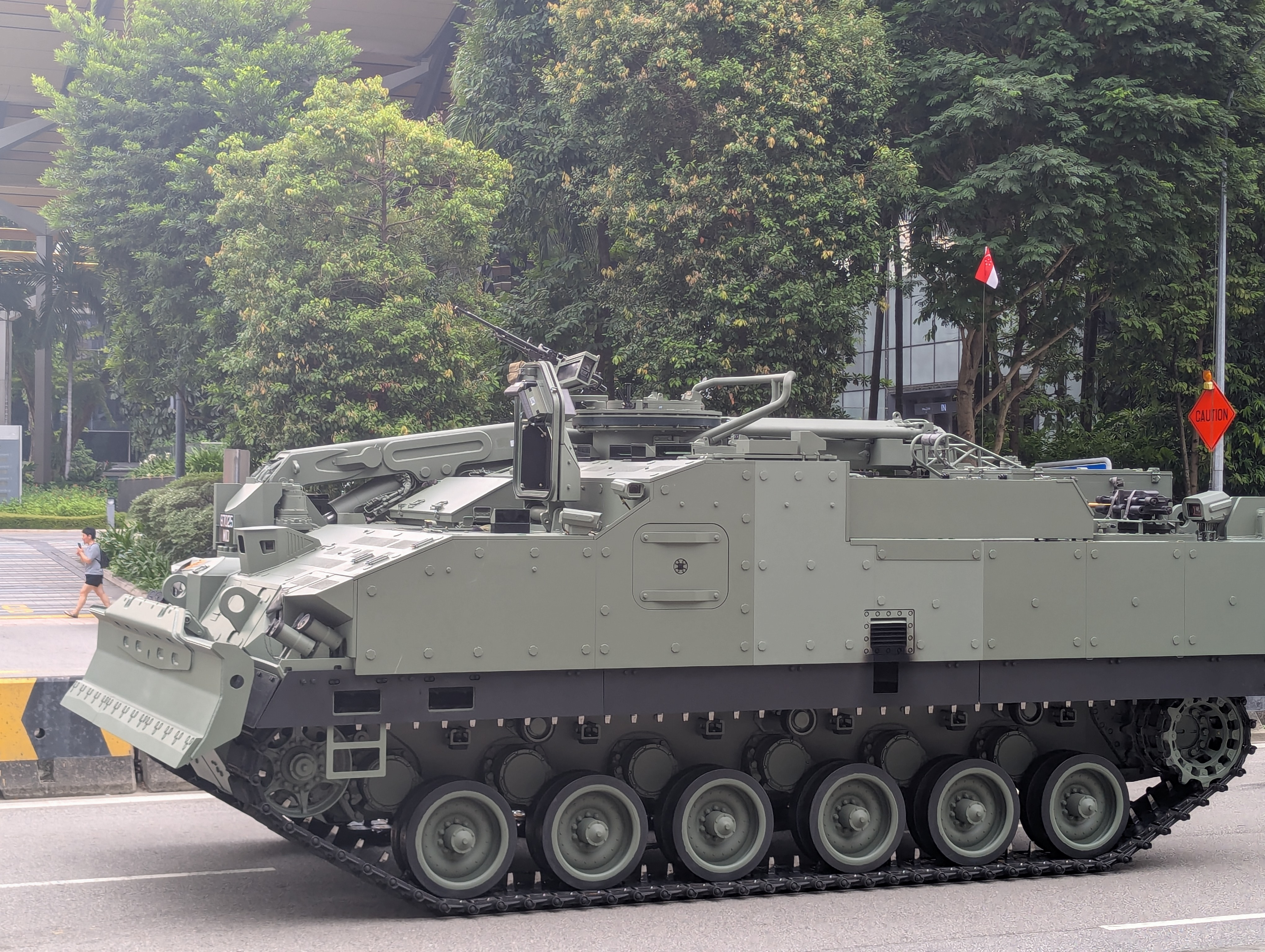
ARV Variant of the Hunter AFV at Singapore's National Day Parade rehearsal 2025

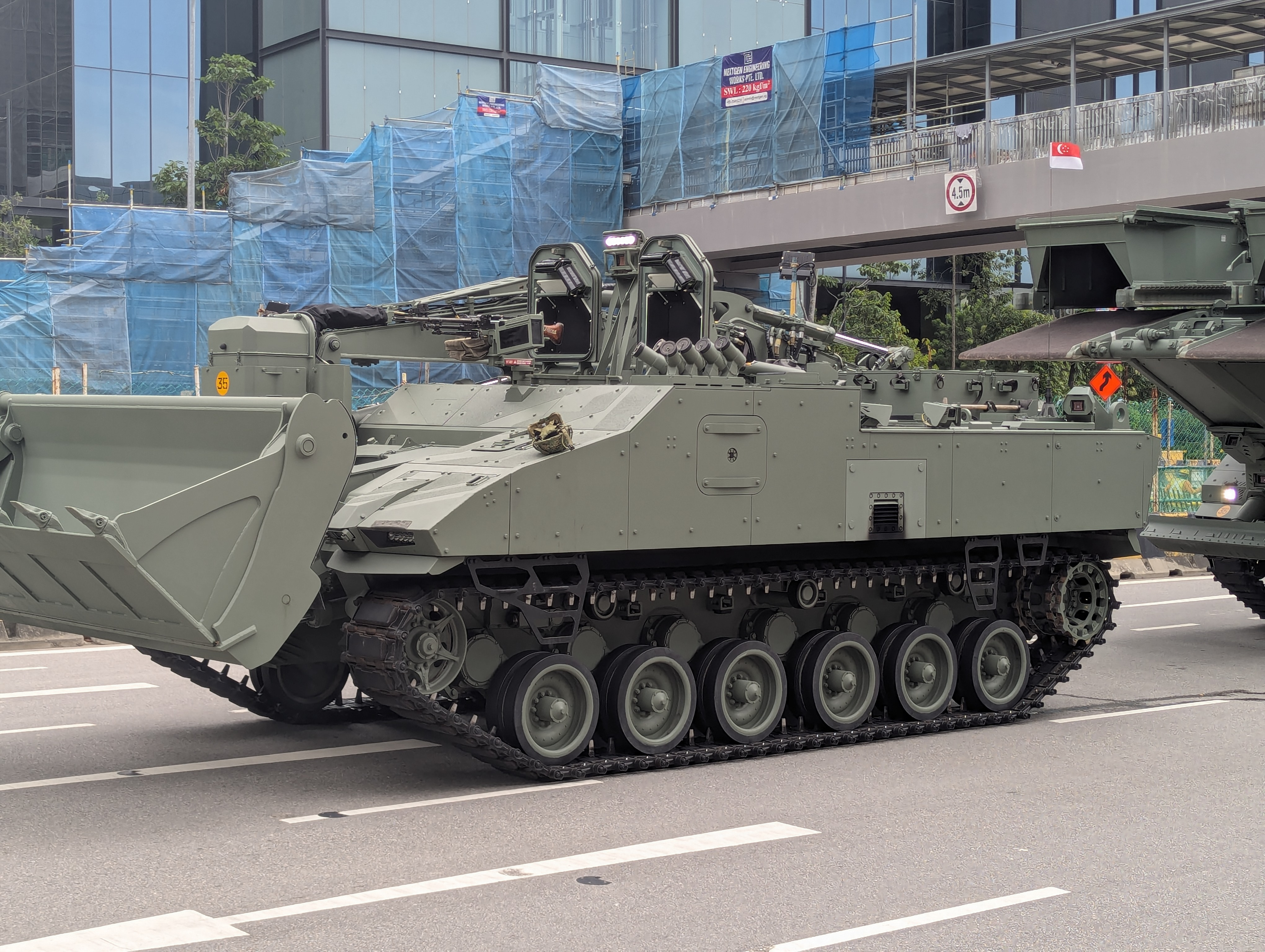
AEV Variant of the Hunter AFV at Singapore's National Day Parade rehearsal 2025

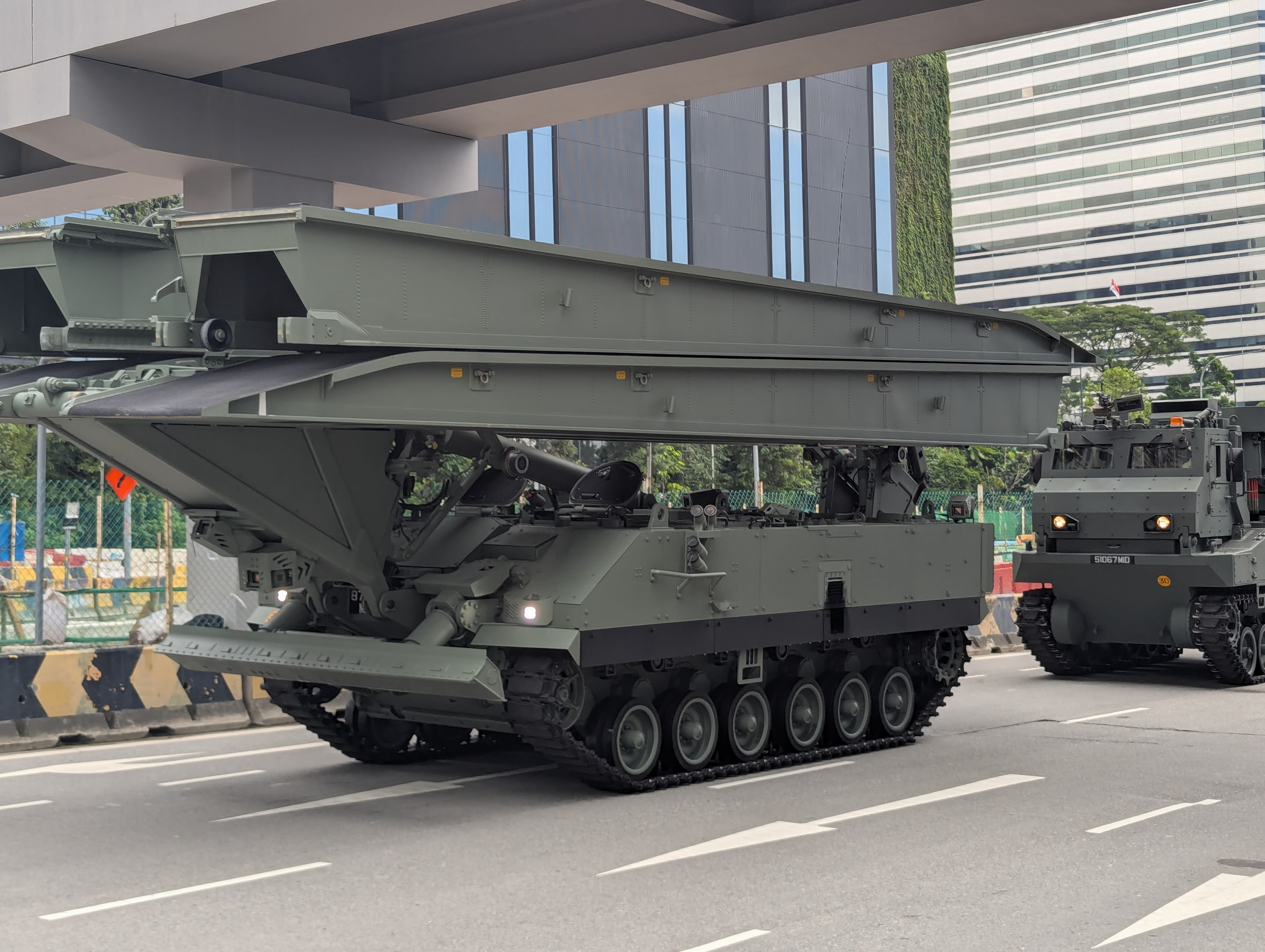
AVLB Variant of the Hunter AFV at Singapore's National Day Parade rehearsal 2025

== See also ==
=== Comparable AFV/IFVs ===
- Ajax – (United Kingdom)
- ASCOD – (Spain, Austria)
- BMPT-72 Terminator – (Russia)
- T-15 Armata – (Russia)
- Dardo IFV – (Italy)
- Kentaurus – (Greece)
- K21 – (South Korea)
- Lynx – (Germany)
- Schützenpanzer Puma – (Germany)
- Namer – (Israel)
- Tulpar IFV – (Turkey)
- WPB Anders – (Poland)
- ZBD-97 – (China)
