= Otokar Tulpar =

Turkish infantry fighting vehicle

Tulpar
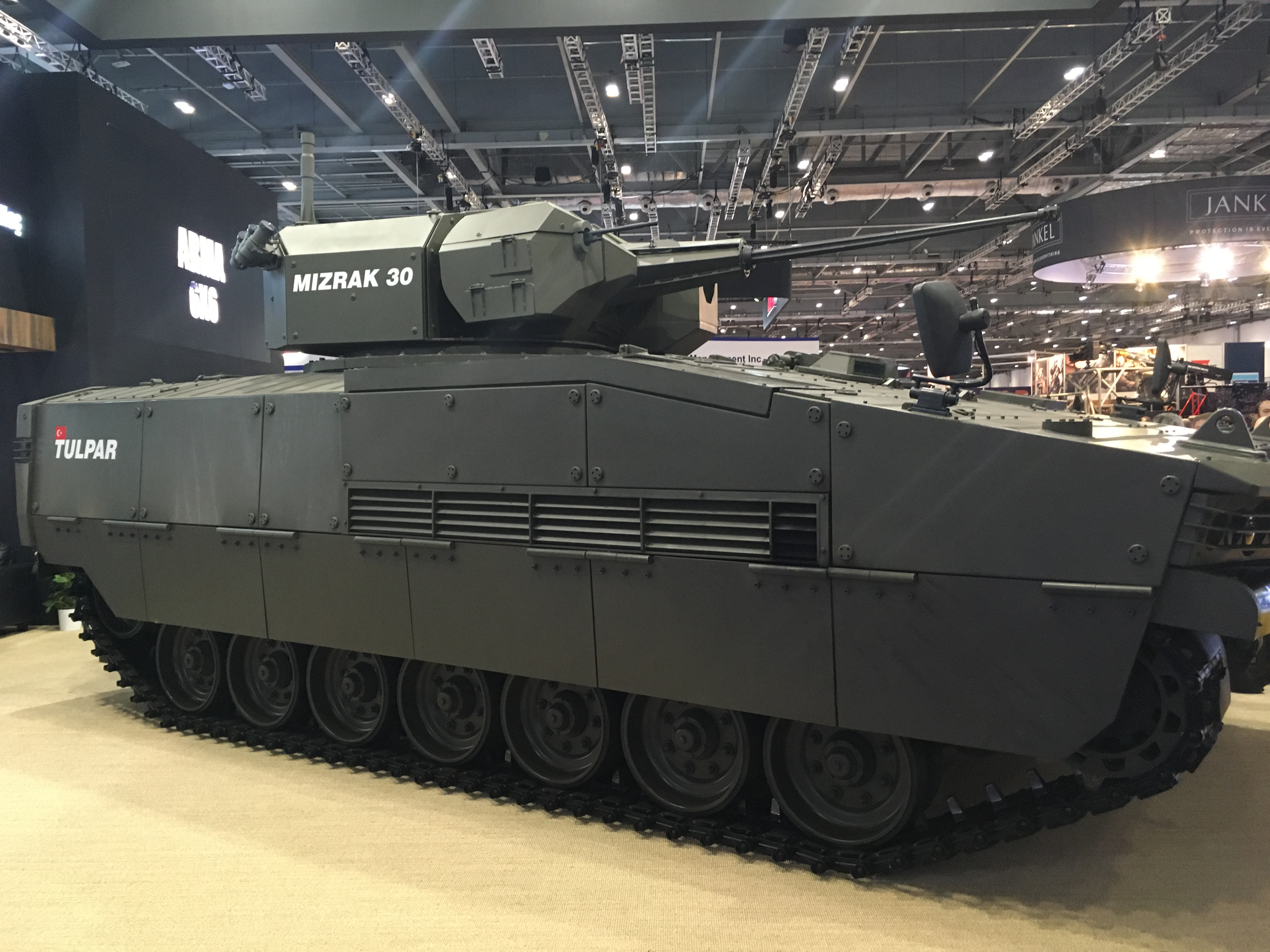
- Tulpar as shown at the DSEI-2019
- Type: Infantry fighting vehicle; Light tank
- Place of origin: Turkey

Production history
- Designer: Otokar
- Designed: 2011
- Manufacturer: Otokar
- Unit cost: $1.2 million
- Produced: 2012

Specifications
- Mass: 32 tonnes (35 short tons) (up to 42 tonnes (46 short tons) depending on configuration)
- Length: 7,230 millimetres (23.72 ft)
- Width: 3,400 millimetres (11.2 ft)
- Height: 2,676 millimetres (8.780 ft) (turret ceiling)
- Crew: 3 (commander, gunner, driver); 9 troopers
- Armor: protects against 25 mm APFSDS
- Main armament: 30 mm dual-fed cannon
- Secondary armament: 7.62 mm coaxial machine gun
- Engine: Scania DSI 14 litres or DSI 16, V8 Diesel; 810 hp (410- 595 kW) 2300 Nm Turbo Diesel
- Power/weight: 24.1 hp/tonne
- Transmission: SAPA SG-850, 32-Speed Automatic
- Suspension: torsion bar
- Operational range: 600 km
- Maximum speed: 70 km/h

Tulpar is a Turkish family of heavy infantry fighting vehicle and light tank designed by the Sakarya-based automotive manufacturer Otokar. It is named after the Tulpar, a winged horse in Turkic mythology.

Tulpar is designed to complement Turkey's Altay MBT, transporting infantry while providing fire support for other armored units. The IFV is also available in variants such as reconnaissance, command-and-control, personnel carrier, mortar, recovery, launch rocket system, air defence, ambulance and anti-tank vehicles.

== Background ==
Even though the TSK has not formally posted an immediate requirement for a new infantry fighting vehicle, Otokar has started the development of Tulpar along with the Altay. Tulpar was designed by the same team that developed Altay. After a 3-year design and development stage, Tulpar was finally unveiled to the public in 2013 at the International Defence Industry Fair (IDEF) in Istanbul.

== Design ==
Tulpar was designed for the role of providing fire support to friendly main battle tanks and transporting troops in a high-threat environment. Resistance against IEDs, small mines and high ballistic protection for its crew were among the high priority design criteria. Tulpar is also fully networkable with the Altay MBT and other units.

In its basic form the Tulpar provides protection against small arms (STANAG 4569 level 2), but it can be upgraded with composite armor that provides protection against 25 mm projectiles (STANAG 4569 level 5). Tulpar features modular armor. This allows the maintenance center to quickly swap any damaged armor panels and also makes the IFV easily upgradable for added protection against higher caliber projectiles. Export customers of Tulpar can decide on what level of protection is desired based on their specific threat environment, terrain and IFV configuration.

Otokar plans to install a hard kill system on the future variants of Tulpar. The vehicle is fully NBC protected.

=== Mobility ===
Tulpar is powered by an 810 hp, 15.7-liter, water-cooled V8 diesel engine that is turbo charged and drives a 32-speed automatic transmission. Suspension comes standard with a hydraulic damper and can carry up to 45 tons on the hull. Tulpar's maximum speed is 70 km/h and economic range is 600 km.

=== Armament ===
Otokar's Tulpar is fitted with the Mızrak-U turret system armed with a 30mm dual-fed automatic cannon and a 7.62mm coaxial machine gun. The turret will be equipped with the Umtas anti-tank missile.

=== Situational awareness ===
The Tuplar full 360-degree day/night situational awareness using electro-optic sensors located on the hull and turret.

== Variants ==
=== Tulpar IFV ===
Basic IFV model as described above.

=== Tulpar-S ===
First unveiled at IDEF 2015, the Tulpar-S is significantly lighter (15 tonnes), shorter and narrower than the Tulpar. It is a multi-purposed vehicle platform which retains basic features of standard Tulpar-IFV and has been designed to be both a light and an amphibious platform. Like the Tulpar IFV, the Tulpar has been designed to be modular and can be configured for a variety of roles with a variety of weapons platforms.

In the weapons-carrying, ATGM-armed RCT configuration, the Tulpar-S features a three-person crew (driver, commander, and gunner), with space for two dismounts. In its armoured-personnel-carrier version, the vehicle will also feature a three-person crew but with space for eight dismounts.

=== Tulpar light tank ===
The Tulpar light tank was first shown at Eurosatory 2018. It features a Cockerill 3105 turret mounted on the Tulpar chassis.

Another version of the Tulpar light tank was shown at World Defence Show in Ryad (Saudi Arabia) in February 2024, armed with a turret Hitfact with a 120 mm gun, made by Italian firm Leonardo - Otomelara, this is the same turret that arms the second generation of Iveco - Otomelara Centauro 2 actually in service with the Italian Army

== Operators ==
=== Current operators ===
Turkey
Turkish Armed Forces is expected to initially order up to 400 vehicles to augment the first batch of 250 Altay main battle tanks pending the evaluation trials of the IFV.

=== Potential operators ===
Bangladesh
Bangladesh is reportedly interested in the procurement of 26 vehicles for light tank roles.
Brazil
The Tulpar is a contender in the Brazilian Army's program to acquire 65 MBTs and 78 IFVs to modernize its armored forces. Otokar is offering to Brazil an MMBT version equipped with the Leonardo 120 mm HITFACT MkII, and the IFV version equipped with its indigenous 30 mm turret, or the Brazilian Ares UT30Mk2BR, as well the production of the vehicles in Brazil with a technology transfer agreement. On August 2026, the Brazilian Army began negotiations with Otokar about purchase and domestic production of the vehicle.
Kazakhstan
Kazakhstan has presented a 2026 defence industrial roadmap in cooperation with Turkish defence company Otokar, outlining planned local production activities at the Besqaru facility. The programme includes the localisation of several armoured vehicle platforms, notably the Tulpar tracked infantry fighting vehicle and the Alpar heavy-class unmanned ground vehicle.

=== Failed bids ===
Latvia
In 2023, Latvia tested multiple tracked infantry fighting vehicles, including a variant of the K21. In November 2024, Latvia announced that it entered in negotiations with GDELS SBS for the purchase of an IFV based on the ASCOD 2.
Poland
Otokar is offering the Tulpar for the future heavy infantry fighting vehicle of the Polish Army. It will compete against AS21 Redback, the General Dynamics Ajax, the Rheinmetall KF-41 Lynx, the BAE Systems AMPV. Ultimately, the vehicle was not selected for procurement; instead, the decision was made to implement the domestic CBWP Ratel project

== See also ==
- Abhay Infantry Combat Vehicle developed in India
- Anders Polish prototype family of medium, tracked combat vehicles
- Ajax armoured fighting vehicles family for the British Army
- ASCOD Austrian/Spanish cooperation armoured fighting vehicle family
- Bionix Singaporean armoured fighting vehicles
- BMD-4 Russian amphibious IFV
- BMP-3 Soviet and Russian IFV
- Borsuk Polish amphibious IFV
- BTR-4 Ukrainian amphibious IFV
- Badger South African IFV
- CV 90 Swedish tracked armored combat vehicle
- Dardo Italian Army IFV
- Hunter Singaporean armoured fighting vehicles
- Kurganets Russian future amphibious modular IFV/APC
- K21 South Korean IFV
- Lynx German armoured fighting vehicle
- Makran Iranian APC
- M2 Bradley armoured fighting vehicle platform of the United States
- Namer Israeli heavy APC
- Schützenpanzer Puma German IFV
- Type 89 IFV Japanese IFV
- T-15 Russian future heavy IFV
- Warrior British APC/IFV
- ZBD-04 Chinese IFV
