= K21 =

South Korean infantry fighting vehicle

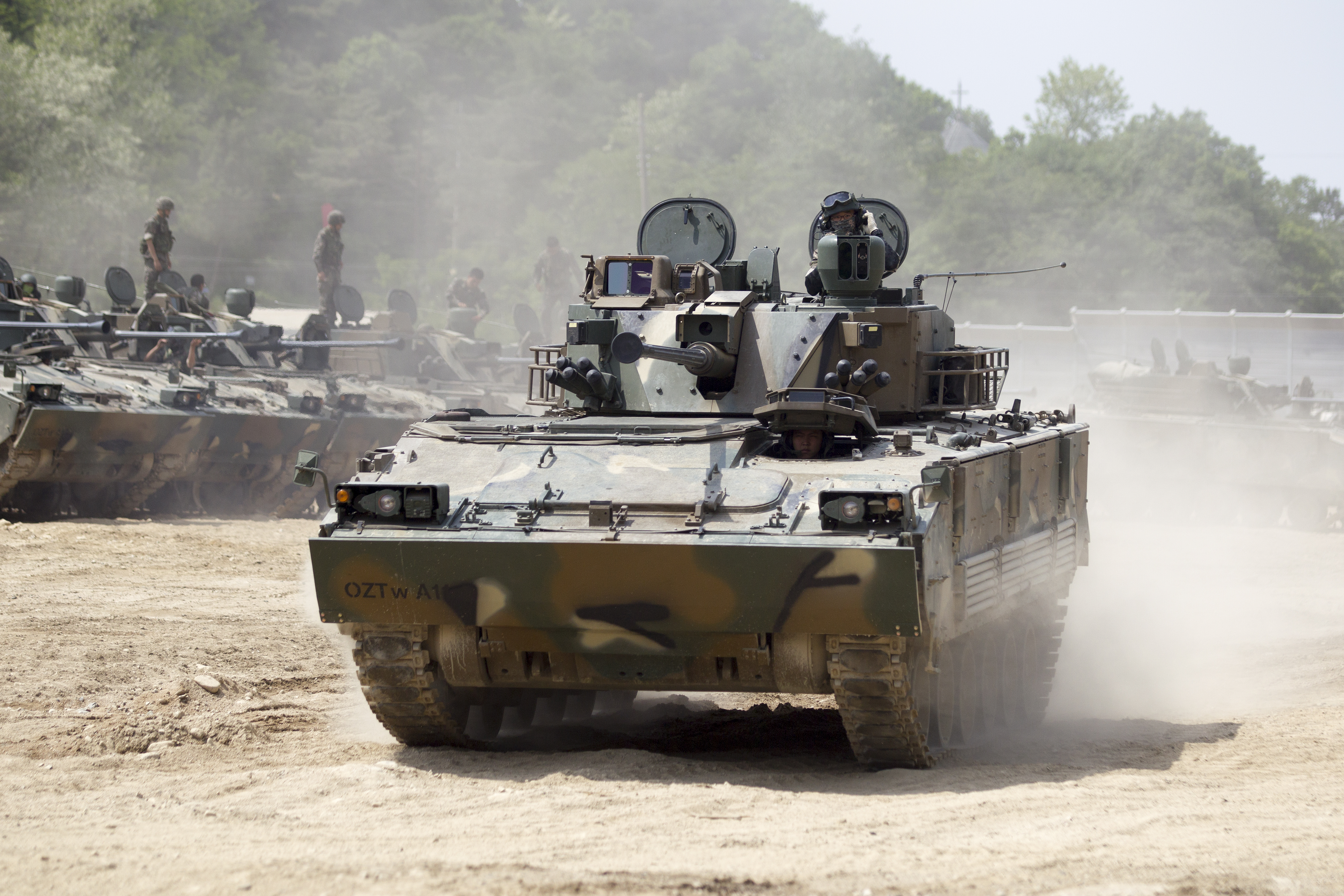
- K21 on combat firing practice
- Type: Infantry fighting vehicle
- Place of origin: South Korea

Service history
- In service: 2009–present

Production history
- Designer: Agency for Defense Development
- Designed: 1999–2008
- Manufacturer: Hanwha Defense (originally Daewoo Heavy Industries, later renamed as Doosan DST, follow by Hanwha Defense Systems)
- Unit cost: $3.2 million
- Produced: 2009–present
- No. built: 466

Specifications
- Mass: 25.6 t (25.2 long tons; 28.2 short tons)
- Length: 6.9 m (23 ft)
- Width: 3.4 m (11 ft)
- Height: 2.6 m (8.5 ft)
- Crew: 3 crew + 9 passengers
- Armor: 2519 aluminium alloy chassis. Layers consisting of S2 glass fiber reinforced Al_{2}O_{3} ceramic armour All round protection against 14.5×114mm API projectiles as well as 20 mm FSP Frontal armour is resistant to 30 mm APDS rounds fired from a 2A72 autocannon (standard on BMP-3 turrets) Roof armour is resistant to 155 mm artillery shell fragments Soft- and hard-kill anti-missile defense systems, ERA, NERA (only for the K21 PIP)
- Main armament: SNT Dynamics K40 40×365mmR autocannon (240 rounds); Two Raybolt ATGM launchers (planned)
- Secondary armament: 7.62 mm M60 GPMG
- Engine: Doosan- D2840LXE diesel 750 hp (840 hp for the PIP)
- Power/weight: 29.2 hp/tonne
- Suspension: Passive in-arm suspension unit (ISU)
- Operational range: 500 km (310 mi)
- Maximum speed: 70 km/h (43 mph) (road); 40 km/h (25 mph) (cross-country); 7 km/h (4.3 mph; 3.8 kn) (water)

The K21 is a South Korean infantry fighting vehicle. A replacement for the K200-series, it was formerly designated as K300 or XK21 KNIFV (Korea Next-generation Infantry Fighting Vehicle). The initial production began in 2009, with the Republic of Korea Army planning to field approximately 466 units. It is designed to effectively defeat other IFVs as heavily armed and armored as the BMP-3.

== History ==
Development began in 1999. A $77 million contract was awarded to Doosan DST for the NIFV prototype in 2003. Three prototype vehicles were delivered to the ROK Army in 2005. A contract worth $386.7 million for the first batch of K21 vehicles was signed in October 2008. Production began in November 2009 after a ten-year development period. K21s will be deployed from 2013 through 2016.

== Design ==
=== Construction ===
The K21 KNIFV's chassis is constructed entirely out of aluminium with certain parts, like hatches, made of fiberglass, reducing the weight of the vehicle and enabling it to travel at higher speeds without bulky and powerful engines. The NIFV is to be lighter than other IFVs, including the American Bradley series, increasing both speed and payload.

The design was finally deemed production-ready in 2009, following 10 years in development and a research budget expenditure of approximately US$80 million. More than 85% of the vehicle's design is domestic. However a redesign is in order following the sinking of two vehicles while engaged in amphibious operations. A board of inquiry found that the problem was a lack of buoyancy, a malfunctioning wave plate, and a technical problem with the drain pump, all of which are to be corrected in the new design.

=== Armaments ===
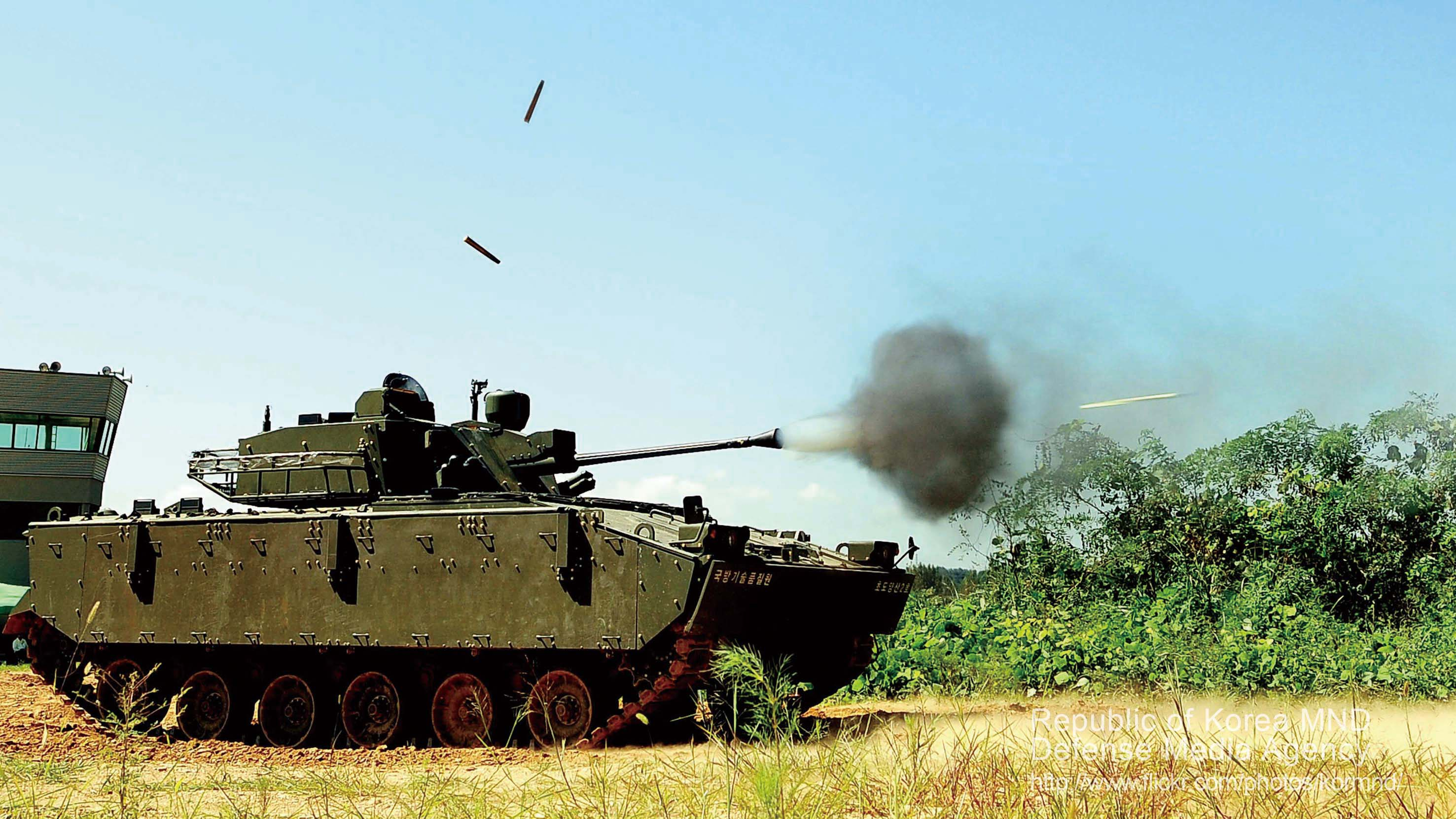
K-21 firing its cannon

The two-man turret on the K21 is armed with an S&T Dynamics K40 40 mm cannon. The K40 40 mm automatic gun was developed based on the design of the Nobong 40 mm twin naval cannon, which was developed to replace the OTO Melara DARDO CIWS, which was serviced by the South Korean Navy, capable of firing APFSDS, high-explosive, smoke and multipurpose munitions, and a 7.62 mm machine gun. This is combined with an advanced fire-control system and gun stabilizer usually found on third-generation main battle tanks that makes the K21, together with the German Puma, able to move and engage the targets with high degree of accuracy at the same time. The ammunition for the autocannon is stored under the turret. The 40 mm cannon can fire up to 300 rounds per minute, with a projectile velocity of up to 1,005 m/s (3,300 ft/s). The improved APFSDS for it are able to penetrate up to 160–220 mm (6.3–8.7 in) of armor, slightly higher than other similar rounds, due to a self-sharpening process as the round penetrates armour.

The K236 MMFA (Multi-mode Fused Ammunition) has several modes including proximity, air burst, armour-piercing and fragmentation. The mode is configured by the K21's FCS, which then transmits the necessary data to a small programmable fuse system inside the round before it is fired. This allows more control over the trajectory and impact of the round, expanding the scope of possible targets from medium armored vehicles to aircraft and infantry personnel.

Anti-tank armament includes an indigenous 3rd-generation ATGM, with performance similar to the Israeli Spike and armour penetration of 700 to 1,000 mm (28 to 39 in) of RHA base.

=== Sensors ===
The fire-control system is able to spot and track targets as far away as 6,000 metres (3.7 mi) away and identify them from up to 3,000 metres (1.9 mi) away. IFF sensors are also present. The vehicle also has hunter-killer capabilities with its separate commander's sight (IFV Commander's Panoramic Sight or ICPS) and gunner's sight (IFV Gunner's Primary Sight or IGPS), which can detect both ground and aerial targets. The sights are designed by Samsung Thales.

The gunner's sight is equipped with a third generation thermal viewer and a 1.54 μm laser rangefinder. It can detect targets from 6,000 meters away and identify them from 3,000 meters away. The commander's sight is equipped with the same system as the gunner's. This allows the gunner to use the commander's sight to engage targets if his own sight is disabled or destroyed. The commander of the vehicle also has the ability to override the command to take control of the turret and gun from the gunner.

=== Armour ===
Although not much is known about the composition of the K21's armour, the frontal armour of the vehicle is specifically designed to protect against large caliber automatic cannon rounds, primarily the 30 mm APDS munitions (30×165mm) for 2A72 automatic cannon used on BMP-3, which has approximately 50 mm (2.0 in) armour penetration at ranges of 1,000 m. The side armour is designed to protect against 14.5 mm AP rounds, which have approximately 25 mm (0.98 in) armour penetration at 1,000 m. The top can withstand fragments from 152 mm artillery shells exploding as close as 10 meters. It has been confirmed that the composite armour comprises S2-glass fibre and Al_{2}O_{3} ceramic including lightweight aluminium alloy.

The vehicle has a soft self-sealing fuel tank that can absorb the impact of a projectile. There is also an automatic fire suppression system inside the vehicle to extinguish any internal fires that might erupt.

The K21 PIP (Product Improvement Program) will include an active protection suite and hard-kill anti-missile system similar to the AWiSS that will also be utilized for the K2 PIP. This will increase the vehicle's ability to defend itself against various ATGMs.

=== Troop deployment ===
The K21 is able to carry a total of 9 passengers and 3 more vehicle crew members. With the Battle Management System, the vehicle crew and passengers inside the vehicle can be instantly notified about the environment around them, improving their situational awareness. A 15 in (38 cm) screen is installed inside the passenger compartment, which provides various data from the BMS. The vehicle is mounted with an external CCD camera, and the passengers inside can survey the environment using the same screen.

=== Mobility ===
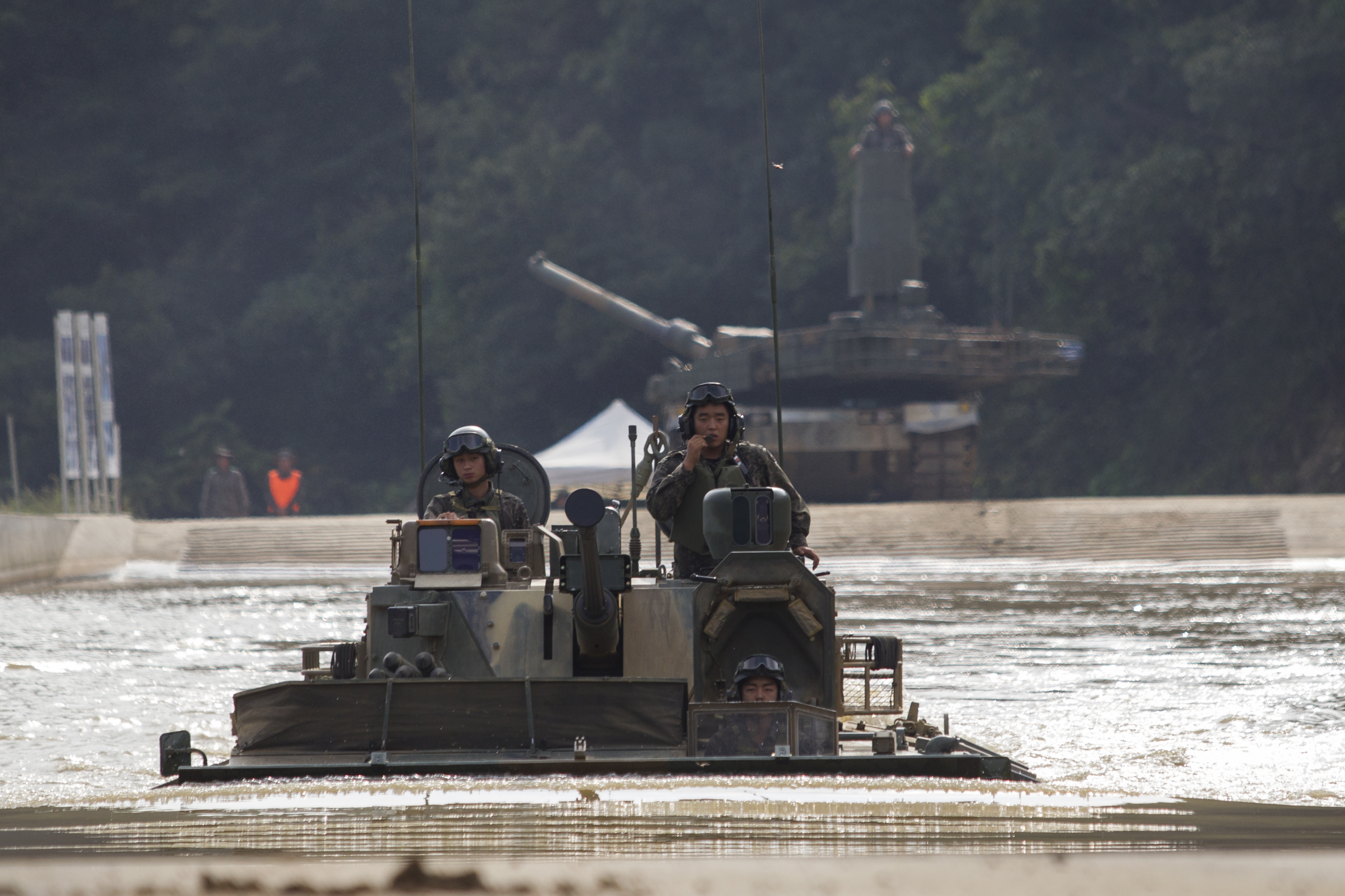
Amphibious driver training

The K21 is equipped with a turbocharged Doosan D2840LXE V-10 diesel engine. The vehicle weight is approximately 25.6 tonnes which, combined with the total output of the engine, gives it a power/weight ratio of approximately 29 hp/t. The K21 PIP will feature an improved version of the engine that will give the vehicle an increased power of 840 hp.

A newly developed semi-active ISU, or In-arm Suspension Unit, is available for the K21. The same unit is to be used on the K2 Black Panther. Despite having the same ISU used on the K2 Black Panther, the K21 cannot change its posture.

The vehicle can travel on both land and water. A pontoon system gives more buoyancy to float on water when additional weight is put on to the vehicle.

=== Pricing ===
The average cost per unit is approximately ₩3.95 billion (US$3.5 million) (2014).

== Variants ==
=== K21-105 Medium tank ===
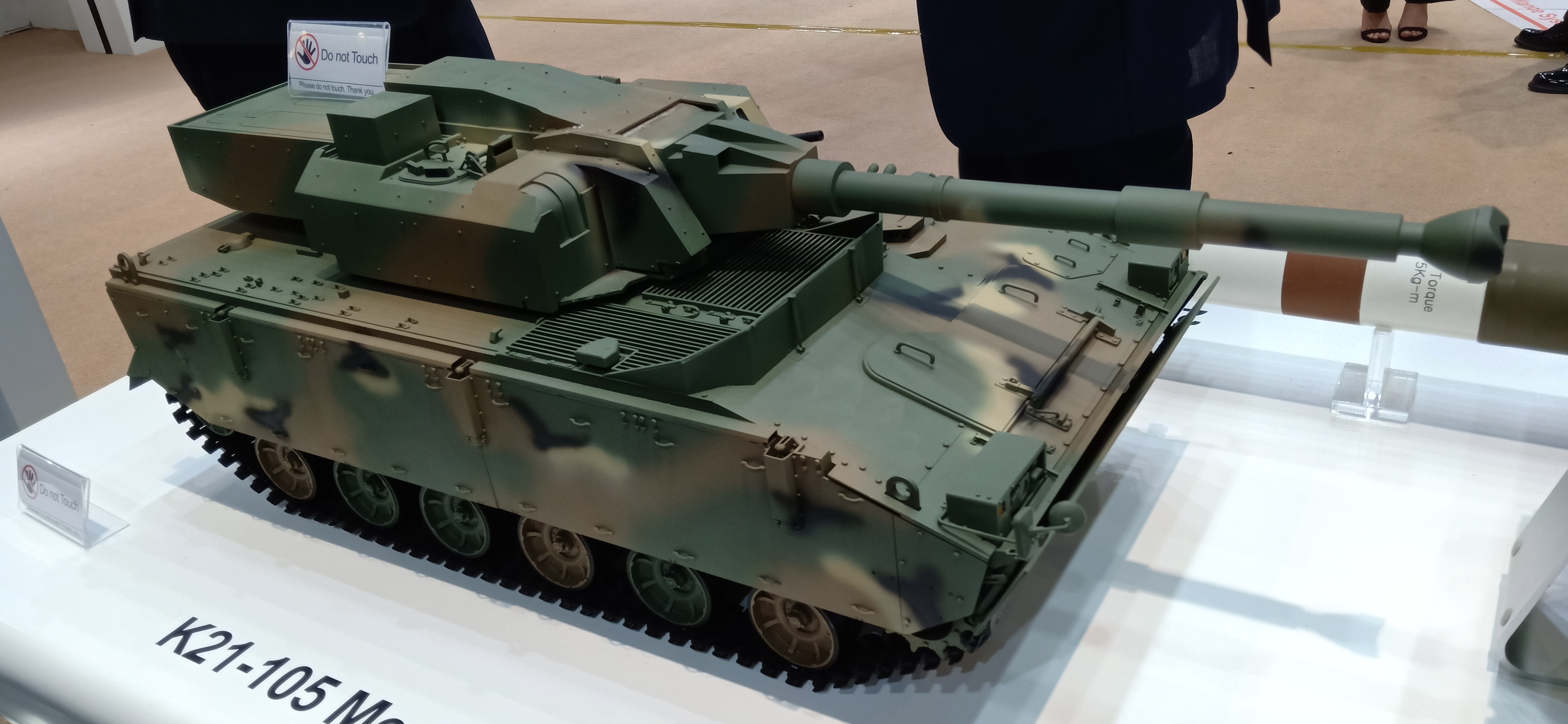
K21-105 Medium Tank

Doosan DST and Belgian firm Cockerill joined in early 2013 to develop the Cockerill XC-8 turret for the K21 to provide a medium weight direct fire capability. The XC-8 is based on the Cockerill CT-CV 105HP turret and is fitted with a 105 mm or 120 mm gun. The 105 mm version fires all NATO 105 mm ammunition and can also use the Cockerill Falarick 105 Gun-Launched Anti-Tank Guided Missile (GLATGM). It has a maximum elevation of 42 degrees, allowing for a max indirect fire range of 10 km (6.2 mi). The 120 mm version fires all NATO 120 mm ammunition and can utilize the Cockerill Falarick 120 GLATGM. The missile can engage heavy armor beyond 5 km (3.1 mi). Both turrets have a two-man crew, are autoloaded, and are digital, fully stabilized, day/night weapon systems.

In 2014, CMI Defence and Doosan DST publicly revealed the K21-105, a light tank version of the K21 chassis fitted with a CMI Defence CT-CV 105HP turret. Referred to as a medium tank by its developers, the vehicle weighs around 25 tons with a 3-man crew, and is cheaper to produce and maintain and has better mobility than actual tanks. The vehicle's main role is direct fire support for infantry against armored and soft-skinned vehicles, buildings, and fortifications. Main armament is a 105 mm rifled low-recoil gun that fires standard NATO and newly developed smart ammunition with a max direct fire range of 4 km (2.5 mi); although the gun would not be effective against modern main battle tanks, it can defeat older tanks that North Korea still has in widespread service. The gun can also fire the Ukrainian-designed laser-guided Falarick 105 GLATGM, which has a range of 5 km (3.1 mi) and a tandem warhead capable of penetrating 550 mm (22 in) of armor behind ERA. The turret has a bustle-mounted automatic ammunition loading system capable of firing 8 rounds per minute and stores rounds in the bustle compartment, separated from the crew. Secondary armament is a coaxial 7.62 mm machine gun plus an optional roof-mounted 12.7 mm machine gun in a remote weapon station. The K21-105 retains the protection level and amphibious capability of the K21 IFV.

Hanwha Defense (previously Doosan DST) now labels the K21-105 as a medium tank.

=== Redback with LMUK turret ===
At the Defence Vehicle Dynamics event, held at UTAC Millbrook Proving Ground in Bedfordshire on 16/17 September 2026, a Redback IFV was displayed featuring a Lockheed Martin UK (LMUK) turret evolved from the one the company originally designed for the British Army’s cancelled Warrior Capability Sustainment Programme. Armed with a CT40 autocannon, this combination could address the British Army’s Land Ground-Based Air Defence (GBAD) requirement.

== Operators ==
=== Current operators ===
South Korea
~400 units in Republic of Korea Army service.

=== Future operators ===
Australia

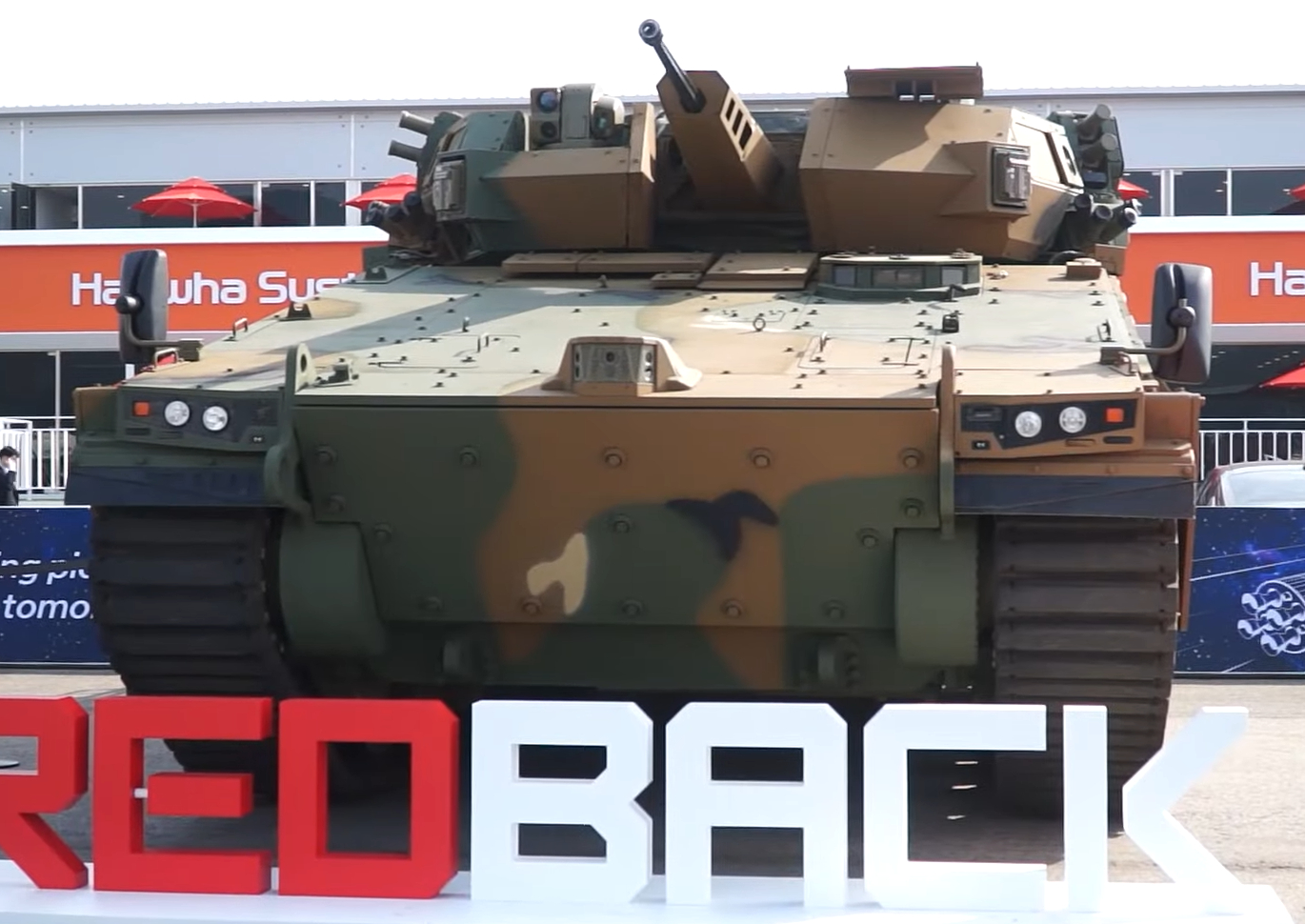
AS21 Redback demonstration (2024)

129 units to be ordered for the Australian Army. Hanwha Defense Australia (HDA), a subsidiary of Hanwha Defense, proposed a derivative of the K21 known as the AS21 Redback for the Australian Army's Land 400 Phase 3 IFV project. In March 2019, Rheinmetall's Lynx KF41 and the Redback AS21 were shortlisted for consideration for the project. The same month three prototype AS21s were delivered to the Australian Army for testing purposes. Testing was supposed to begin in 2019 and last two years, but it was delayed by the COVID-19 pandemic. In July 2023, the AS21 Redback was announced as the successful bidder for the project. The Redback weighs 42 tons and is powered by a MTU America MT881 Ka-500 diesel with an Allison transmission. It has a maximum range of 525 km (326 mi) and a top speed of 65 km/h (40 mph). It can carry eight passengers and has a crew of three. The Redback has a Soucy Defense single piece composite rubber track. The Australian-designed Electro Optic Systems (EOS) T-2000 turret based on the Elbit Systems MT30 Mk 2 features an ATK Mark 44S Bushmaster II 30mm auto cannon, fitted with a two round Rafael Spike LR2 anti-tank guided missile (ATGM) system, an EOS R400 Remote Weapons Station (RWS) and a coaxial mounted MAG58 7.62mm machinegun. The Redback is equipped with the Elbit Iron Fist active protection system (APS) and an Elbit IronVision system that provides the crew with a 360 degree view. The Redback is protected by Plasan armour. Originally 450 vehicles were planned to be acquired to replace Australia's M113AS4 APCs on a one-for-one basis, but this was reduced in April 2023 by the Defence Strategic Review. The review recommended that the acquisition be accelerated. The first Redback is planned to be delivered in early 2027 with deliveries completed by late 2028 at an acquisition cost of between AU$5-$7 billion (US$3.4-$4.7 billion). The Redback will be manufactured in a purpose-built Australian factory. HDA has proposed a small initial tranche be built in South Korea to meet the accelerated delivery date.

=== Unsuccessful bids ===
Latvia
In 2023, Latvia tested multiple tracked infantry fighting vehicles, including a variant of the K21. In November 2024, Latvia announced that it entered in negotiations with GDELS SBS for the purchase of an IFV based on the ASCOD 2.

Philippines

In 2019, the K21-105 variant was among the contenders shortlisted for the Philippine Army’s tracked light tank acquisition project. However, the Department of National Defense ultimately selected the Sabrah light tank for the program.

Poland
The AS21 Redback was tested in Poland at the end of October 2022 as a potential heavy IFV to serve alongside the lighter, amphibious Borsuk. On November 29, 2022 at the Polish-Korean Defense Industry Cooperation Conference, Hanwha proposed to co-develop a Redback-based heavy IFV with HSW. That IFV would have been called PL-21 and armed with the Polish ZSSW-30 unmanned turret. This proposal was not chosen however as Poland ultimately decided to develop their own heavy IFV using the Krab SPG powerpack and suspension as well as experiences gained during the development of the Borsuk IFV. In 2024, due to the failure to develop its own Heavy IFV, the foreign purchase program was resumed. AS21 Redback will compete against Otokar Tulpar, General Dynamics Ajax, Rheinmetall KF-41 Lynx, BAE Systems AMPV. Ultimately, the decision was made not to purchase the AS-21, as it was decided instead to develop and field the domestic CBWP Ratel, manufactured by PGZ and Huta Stalowa Wola.

Romania
Romania has selected from the potential candidates the Rheinmetall KF-41 Lynx model. The contract was signed in 2026.

United States
Oshkosh Defense developed a version of the Redback as its entry under a competitive contract for the U.S. Army Optionally Manned Fighting Vehicle program, but the Oshkosh/Hanwha submission was not selected.

== See also ==
- ASCOD – (Spain, Austria)
  - ASCOD 2 – (Austria, Spain)
    - General Dynamics Ajax – (United Kingdom)
- Bionix AFV – (Singapore)
- Hunter AFV – (Singapore)
- BWP Borsuk – (Poland)
- WPB Anders – (Poland)
- BMP-3 – (Soviet Union, Russia)
- BMD-4 – (Russia)
- CV90 IFV – (Sweden)
- Dardo IFV – (Italy)
- M2 Bradley IFV – (United States)
- Type 89 IFV – (Japan)
- Schützenpanzer Puma – (Germany)
- Tulpar IFV – (Turkey)
- ZBD-97 – (China)
