= WPB Anders =

Family of Polish medium, tracked combat vehicles

Anders
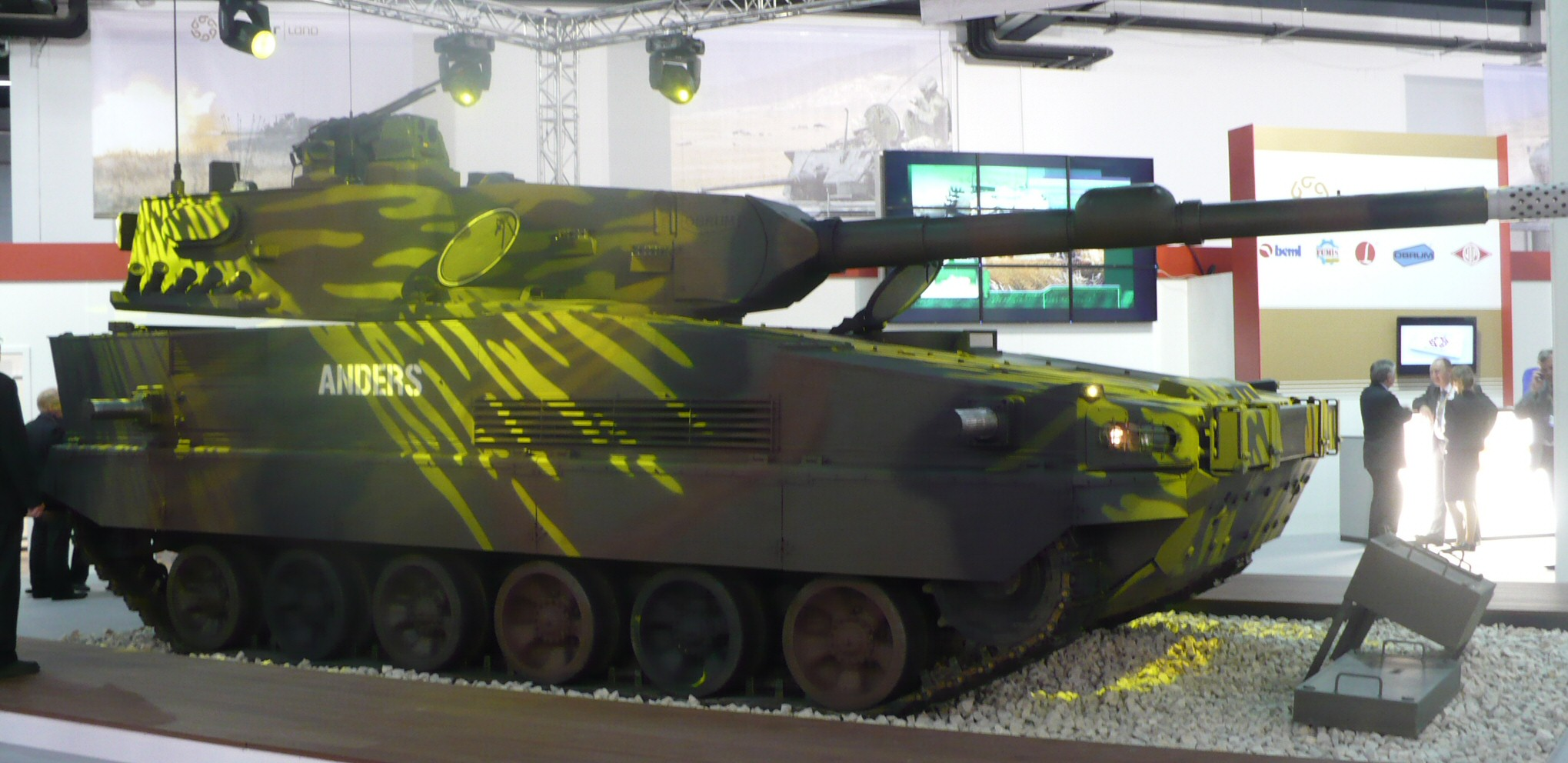
- Anders light tank demonstrator during MSPO exhibition 2010.
- Type: Infantry fighting vehicle; Light tank
- Place of origin: Poland

Production history
- Designer: OBRUM
- Designed: 2008–2011

Specifications
- Mass: 35 t (77,000 lb)
- Length: 6.9 m (22 ft 8 in)
- Width: 3.2 m (10 ft)
- Height: 2.8 m (9 ft 2 in)
- Crew: 3 (Commander, gunner and driver)
- Passengers: 4 (Light Tank) or 8 (IFV)
- Main armament: 120 mm Ruag CTG cannon or 30 × 173 mm ATK Mk44 Bushmaster II gun
- Secondary armament: co-axial 7.62 mm UKM-2000C; 12.7 mm WKM-B or 40 mm GA-40 in remote controlled turret
- Engine: MTU diesel 720 hp (540 kW)
- Power/weight: 22 hp/tonne
- Suspension: Torsion bar suspension
- Maximum speed: 80 km/h (50 mph)

The WPB Anders (Polish: Wielozadaniowa Platforma Bojowa Anders i.e., Anders Multirole Combat Platform) is a family of medium, tracked combat vehicles. The vehicle was designed by OBRUM (Polish: Ośrodek Badawczo-Rozwojowy Urządzeń Mechanicznych – Research and Development Centre for Mechanical Appliances) part of the Bumar Group (now Polish Armaments Group). It is named after Władysław Anders, a general of the Polish Army during World War II and later a member of the Polish government-in-exile.

== History ==
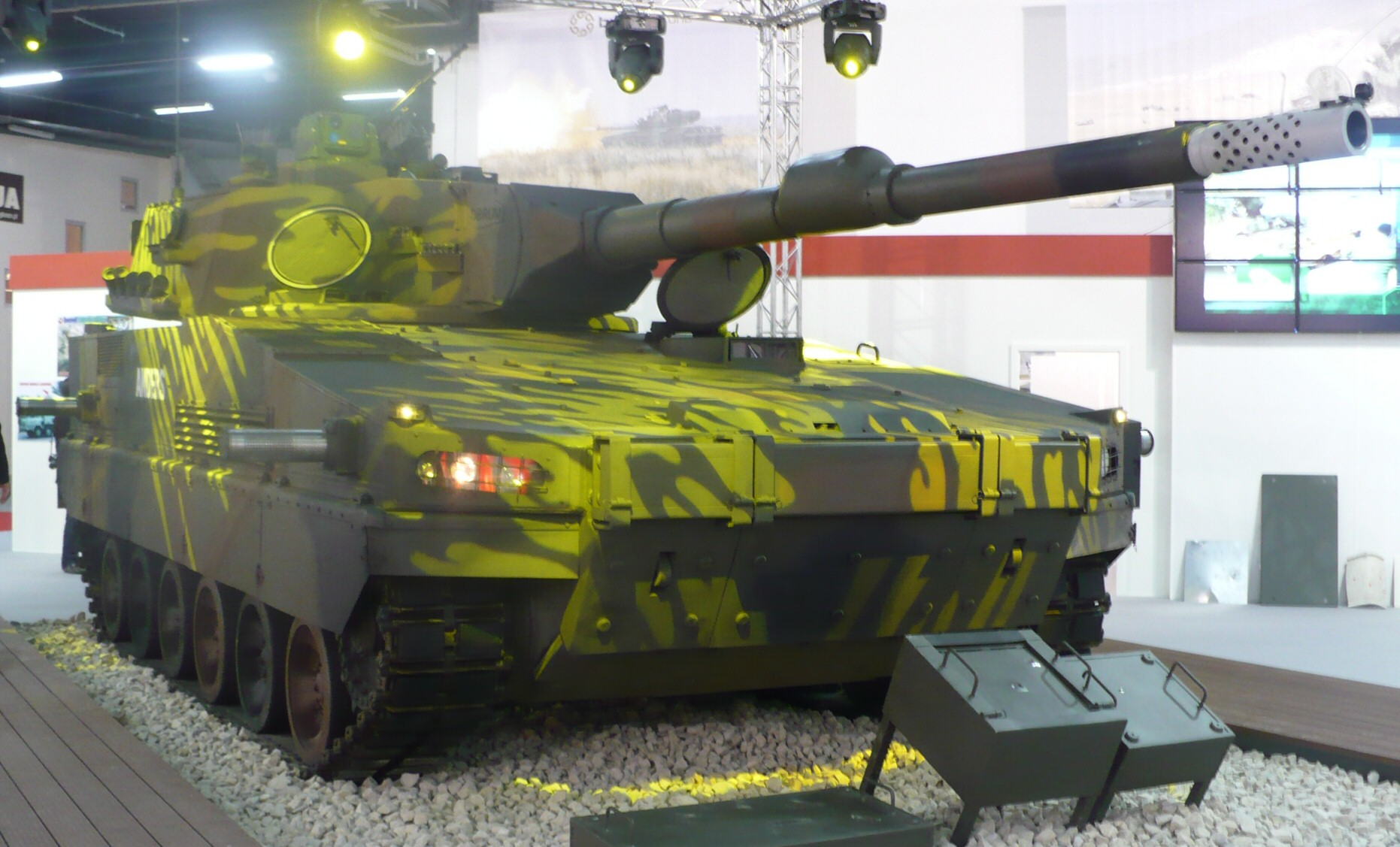
Anders light tank demonstrator on MSPO 2010

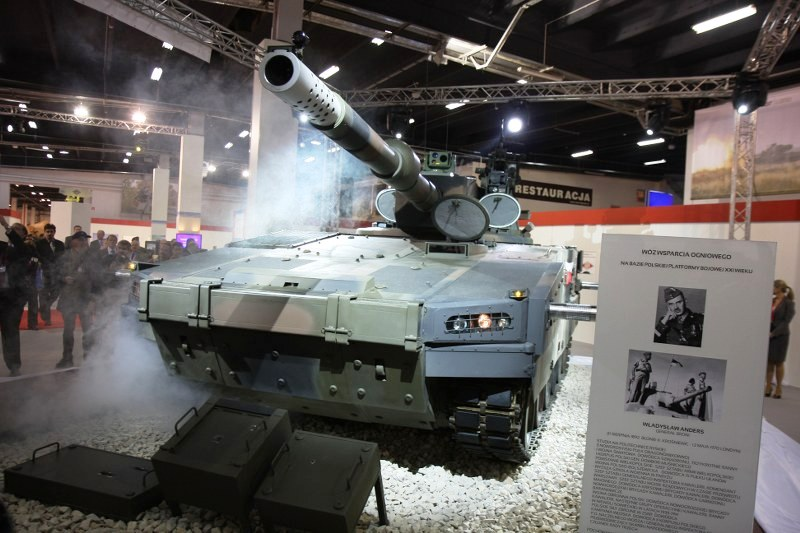
Anders light tank prototype on MSPO 2010

The vehicle was designed to replace the Polish Army's remaining inventory of obsolete BWP-1 fighting vehicles family, the first prototype being publicly shown in 2010, at the MSPO Kielce defense industry exhibition. During its first presentation, the vehicle was shown in its fire support configuration (Polish: wóz wsparcia ogniowego), armed with a 120-mm tank gun. The media referred to this vehicle as a "light tank". Later, the same vehicle was shown configured as an infantry fighting vehicle (Polish: bojowy wóz piechoty) with a KTO Rosomak Hitfist-30P turret. A more advanced IFV prototype has been shown at the 2011 MSPO Kielce exhibition. Further variants, such as command and control, medical evacuation, combat-engineering and self-propelled anti-aircraft gun are also planned.

== Technical details ==
In its basic configuration the vehicle has a STANAG 4569 protection level of 3; this can be increased to level 5 with a planned add-on armor system.

== Variants ==
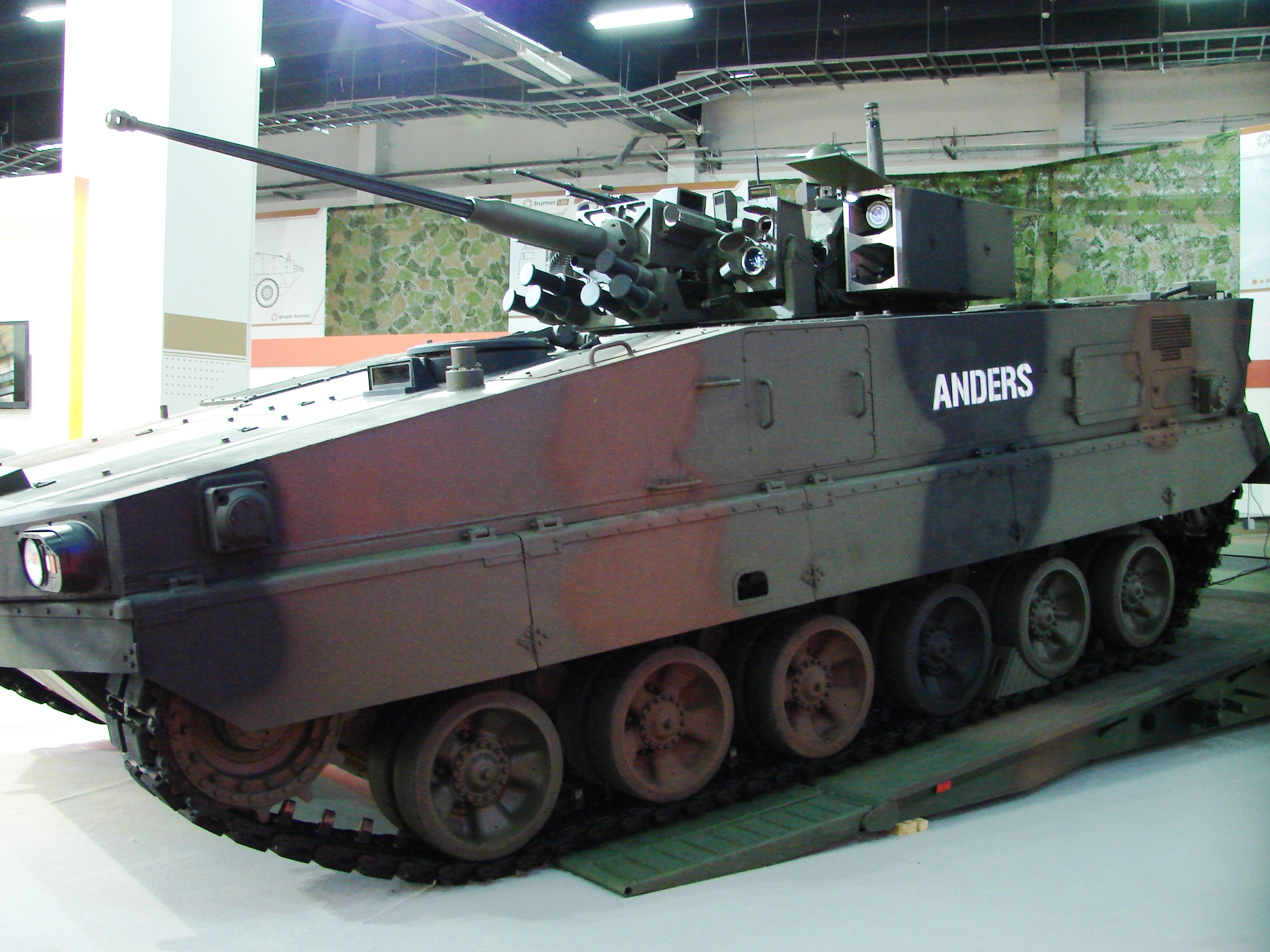
Anders infantry fighting vehicle prototype on MSPO 2011

Developed by OBRUM for Polish Armed Forces as part of the Universal Modular Tracked Platform (UMTP)-family. As of 2016 OBRUM have developed an infantry fighting vehicle based on the Anders chassis, and are furthermore developing versions including engineering vehicles, command and control, ammunition wagons and medical vehicles, etc.

== See also ==
- PT-91 Twardy – (Poland)
- M2 Bradley – (United States)
- AIFV – (United States)
- CV90 – (Sweden)
- Puma – (Germany)
- Warrior – (United Kingdom)
- ASCOD – (Spain, Austria)
- Dardo – (Italy)
- Kentaurus – (Greece)
- Tulpar – (Turkey)
- Bionix – (Singapore)
- K21 – (South Korea)
- Type 89 – (Japan)
- T-15 Armata – (Russia)
- VCTP – (Argentina)
- Abhay – (India)
- PL-01 – (Poland)
