= TAM VCA =

Type of self-propelled artillery

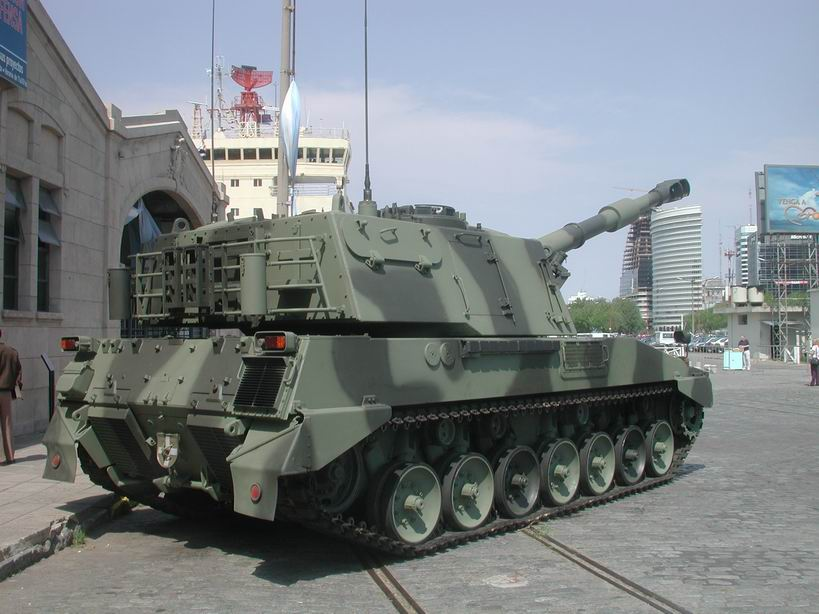
- TAM VCA in Buenos Aires
- Type: Self-propelled artillery
- Place of origin: Argentina

Production history
- No. built: 17

Specifications
- Mass: 40 t
- Length: 10.33 m (33 ft 11 in)
- Width: 3.31 m (10 ft 10 in)
- Height: 3.20 m (10 ft 6 in)
- Crew: 5
- Caliber: 155 mm (6.1 in)
- Main armament: Oto Melara "Palmaria" L41 155 mm (6.1 in) howitzer
- Secondary armament: 1× 7.62 mm (0.3 in) machine gun 8× smoke dischargers
- Engine: MTU-MB 833 Ka-500 6-cylinder 22.4 L (1,370 cu in) diesel 540 kW (720 hp)
- Suspension: Torsion bar
- Ground clearance: 0.45 m
- Operational range: 470 km (290 mi)
- Maximum speed: 60 km/h (37 mph)

The VCA-155 (Vehículo de combate de Artillería, Artillery Combat Vehicle) is a self-propelled 155 mm gun/howitzer, manufactured by TAMSE (Tanque Argentino Mediano Sociedad del Estado) which entered service in the late 1990s.

== Description ==
It uses a TAP chassis (Tanque Argentino Pesado, Argentine Heavy Tank), an abandoned project derived from the TAM (Tanque Argentino Mediano, Argentine Medium Tank). It weighs 40 tonnes, and has 7 rolling wheels.

It has a 155-mm howitzer "Palmaria" turret of Italian origin. It has a vehicular communications equipment SEM 180 and 193, which allows voice communication (within and outside the vehicle), but also operates in digital form.

In total, 17 units were built.

== Usage ==
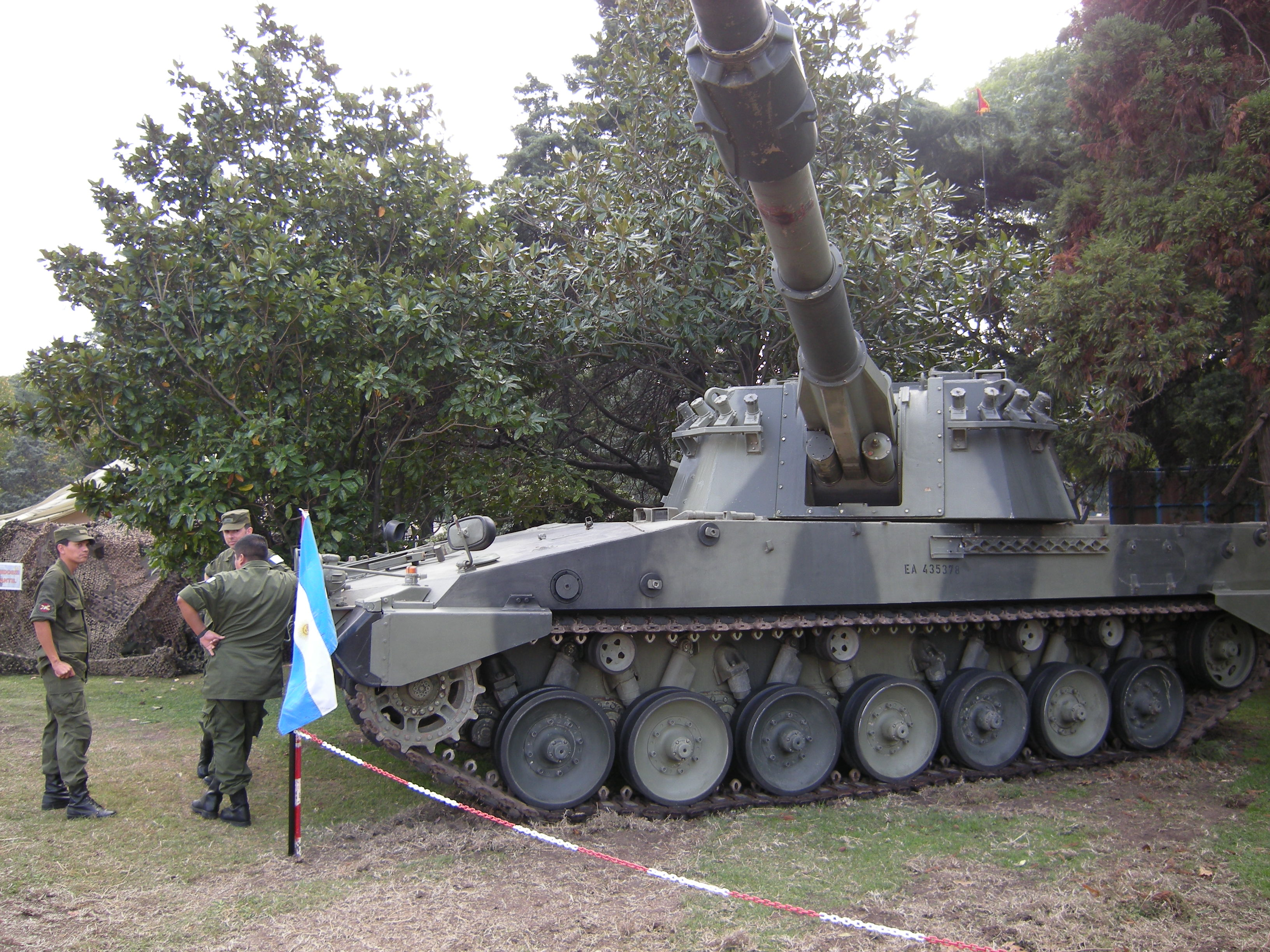
SPG TAM VCA Palmaria 155mm; Argentine Army exhibition; May 2008.

In conjunction with the VCCDT (Vehiculo de Combate Centro de Direccion de Tiro - Combat Vehicle, Fire Control Centre) it makes up a modern system of artillery weapons. It also operates an integrated system for artillery fire campaign called "TRUENO", which enables it to direct artillery fire in an automated mode.

== See also ==
- List of artillery by country
- TAM (tank)
- Palmaria (artillery)
- OF-40
- Marder IFV
- Leopard 1
