= OF-40 =

Italian main battle tank

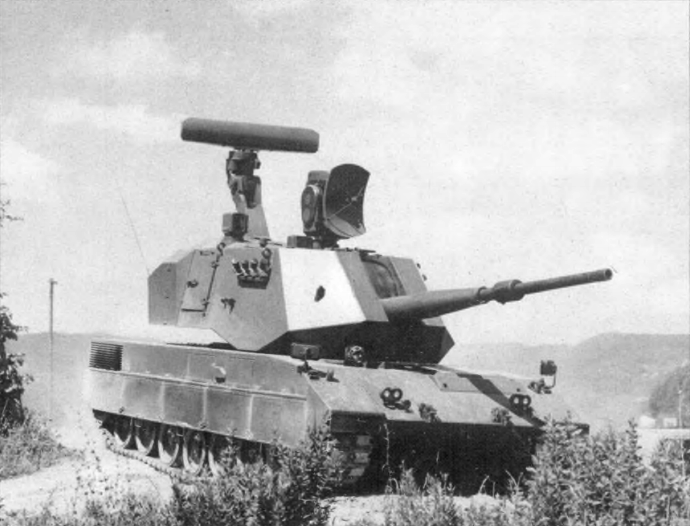
- OF-40 hull with Otomatic turret
- Type: Main battle tank
- Place of origin: Italy

Service history
- Used by: United Arab Emirates (former)

Production history
- Designer: OTO Melara
- Designed: 1977
- Manufacturer: OTO Melara/Fiat
- Produced: 1980–1985
- No. built: 39

Specifications
- Mass: 45.5 t (50.2 short tons)
- Length: 9.22 m (30.2 ft)
- Width: 3.51 m (11.5 ft)
- Height: 2.68 m (8.8 ft)
- Crew: 4
- Armour: Composite and sloped design (classified)
- Main armament: 1× OTO-Melara 105mm L/52 rifled gun (57 rounds: hull - 42, turret - 15)
- Secondary armament: 2× 7.62 mm FN MAG (Co-axial and commander's hatch) (5700 Rounds)
- Engine: MTU MB 838 Ca M500 V-10; 830 PS (819 hp, 610 kW)
- Power/weight: 18.2 PS/tonne
- Transmission: ZF
- Suspension: Torsion bar
- Ground clearance: 0.44 m (1.4 ft)
- Fuel capacity: 1,000 L (260 US gal)
- Operational range: 600 km (370 mi)
- Maximum speed: 60 km/h (37 mph)

The OF-40 is an Italian main battle tank developed as a joint venture between OTO Melara and Fiat, and intended primarily for export sales. OTO Melara would develop and produce the hulls, and automotive components would be provided by Fiat (the designation of the vehicle comes from the initials of the two companies, whereas "40" refers to the planned mass of the tank). Initial design work was started by OTO Melara in 1977, with the first prototypes ready by 1980.

While the vehicle was never used by the Italian Army, it was used by the United Arab Emirates until being replaced by the more modern Leclerc MBT.

== Design ==
Oto Melara produced the Leopard under licence, and later worked with German industries to make the Lion/Leone tank, a tropicalized version of the Leopard, in order to freely sell it in the Middle East. Germany pulled out from this development and Italian industries could not sell the Lion without German permission. So they produced this new tank called OF-40, that was a evolution of the Lion lineage. The OF-40 does use the main mechanical components already produced for the Leopard 1, which had also been produced under license by OTO Melara since 1974. The OF-40 follows the layout of the Leopard, especially in the hull. The engine, transmission and tracks are the same, as are the crew and ammunition layout. The driver is located in the front-right of the hull, with ammunition storage and NBC overpressure system located to the driver's left. The turret is located toward the middle of the tank, with the gunner and commander on the right side of the turret, and the loader on the left.

=== Armament ===
The armament consists of a 105 mm main gun with a rifled, 52-calibre barrel, developed by OTO Melara exclusively for this vehicle but very similar to the M68 gun (OTO also produced the M60 tank under licence), more compact and simpler than the L7 gun (especially the recoil system). The cannon is equipped with a thermal sleeve, fume extractor and a semi-automatic breech mechanism and is aimed in both vertical and horizontal axes with an electro-hydraulic drive system. The main gun however is not stabilized. The cannon uses NATO-standard 105 mm ammunition with APDS (1470 m/s muzzle velocity), HEAT (1170 m/s), HESH (730 m/s), incendiary and smoke rounds. The OF-40 Mark 3 variant was armed with the same smoothbore 120mm gun as the C1 Ariete.

Two FN Herstal 7.62 mm MAG machine guns make up the secondary armament: an electrically fired coaxial machine gun slaved to the main cannon and a second gun on an anti-aircraft pintle installed next to the loader's hatch on the turret.

The tank uses an advanced fire-control system developed by Officine Galileo. The commander's station was outfitted with an independently stabilized VS 580-B panoramic day/night sight with an 8x magnification, co-developed with SFIM of France. The sight is housed in an armoured turret located in front of the commander's hatch. The tank gunner uses an 8x C125 telescopic sight to lay fire from the main cannon and coaxial MG. This sight is co-aligned with a Selenia VAQ-33 laser rangefinder which has an effective range from 400 to 10,000 m.

=== Propulsion ===
The OF-40 is powered by a German-made MTU MB 838 Ca M500 diesel motor which provides an output of approx. 610 kW at 2,200 RPM. The MB 838 Ca M500 is a four-stroke, super-charged, 10-cylinder multi-fuel engine with a 90° Vee configuration and is coupled to a ZF transmission system with a fluid torque converter and an epicyclic gearbox with four forward and two reverse gears. The engine is liquid-cooled and further optimized for operation in arid environments with an automatic air-cooling system which detects overheating conditions and activates a cooling fan on the engine deck. The engine compartment also has an automatic fire-extinguishing system.

The running gear consists of 14 (2×7) rubber-rimmed double dished road wheels, two idler wheels (at the front of the hull), two drive sprockets (rear hull) and ten (2×5) return rollers supporting two tracks. The tracks have a service life of approx. 2,500 km. The OF-40 rests on an independent torsion bar suspension system with hydraulic shock absorbers and friction dampers on the first, second, third, sixth and seventh pairs of road wheels.

The tank can also drive under water to a limited depth using a snorkel to feed the engine and comes equipped with two water pumps rated at 120 L/min used to evacuate water from the tank during fording.

== Sales ==
While the tank was trialled by Thailand, demonstrated in Egypt and offered for local production in Spain and Greece, the only orders for the vehicles ultimately came from the United Arab Emirates. The first UAE order of 18 OF-40s was filled in 1981. This was followed by a second order for 18 more OF-40s, and 3 OF-40 derived armoured recovery vehicles which was filled by 1985. OTO Melara no longer offers the OF-40 for purchase.

== Variants ==
OF-40 Mk.2: The Mk.2 version of the OF-40 featured an improved OG14LR fire control system which included dual-axis main gun stabilisation and improved sensors. The Mk.2 had an improved day/night periscope for the commander, an improved sight with variable 7x and 14x magnification for the gunner, and a turret-mounted LLLTV camera which provides night-time observation and identification up to 2 km and relays imagery to monitors at both the gunner's and commander's stations. This variant also received welded steel appliqué armour on the turret front face. All UAE OF-40s have been upgraded to Mk.2 standard.

OF-40 Mk.2 MTCA: A single example of OF-40 Mk.2 was upgraded with the MTCA engine that gave the tank 170 extra HP from 830 to 1000 HP.

OF-40 Mk.2 THETIS: An experimental OF-40 Mk.2 that had access to the THETIS thermal sight+NVD along with extra armour around the tank turret.

OF-40 ARV: An armoured recovery vehicle based on the OF-40 chassis, manned by a 4-man crew and equipped with an 18-ton crane, a 35-ton winch, dozer blade and a welding kit.

OF-40 SPAAG: Although it was never produced, a self-propelled anti-aircraft vehicle similar to the Gepard was proposed should any customers request it.

OF-40 Mk.3: Improved version with a 120mm gun and a V-12 MCTA engine. It is thought to have been created due to Kuwait looking fondly at an improved OF-40, but no deal was ever signed and the tank remained in prototype stage.

Sabiex HIFV: Prototype for a Heavy Infantry fighting vehicle developed in Belgium by Sabiex between 2005 and 2008 for the UAE from leftover OF-40 MK.2 stocks. The vehicle uses a BMP-3 turret and can carry 5 infantrymen plus the 2 operators, it weighs 35 tons without the turret and 45 tons with the turret. Despite the creation of a functional prototype, the conversion of the remaining OF-40 into HIFVs never happened.

=== Related developments ===
The OF-40 hull was later used as the basis for the Palmaria self-propelled artillery system. The Palmaria met with far more success than the OF-40, with 210 being ordered by Libya and 25 by Nigeria. Argentina purchased the Palmaria turrets, but used their own TAM light tank chassis.

Both Leopard 1 and OF-40 hulls were used during the development for the Otomatic self-propelled air-defence system.

== Operators ==
- United Arab Emirates: 36 OF-40 Mk.2, 3 OF-40 ARV. Withdrawn from service and being proposed for conversion to heavy Infantry Fighting Vehicles.

== Similar vehicles ==
- AMX-30 – (France)
- AMX-32 – (France)
- AMX-40 – (France)
- EE-T1 Osório – (Brazil)
- Leopard 1 – (Germany)
- M60 Patton – (United States)
- TR-85 – (Romania)
- Type 74 tank – (Japan)
- Vickers MBT – (United Kingdom)
- Vickers MBT Mark 3 – (United Kingdom)
- Vickers MBT Mark 4 – (United Kingdom)
