= Palmaria (artillery) =

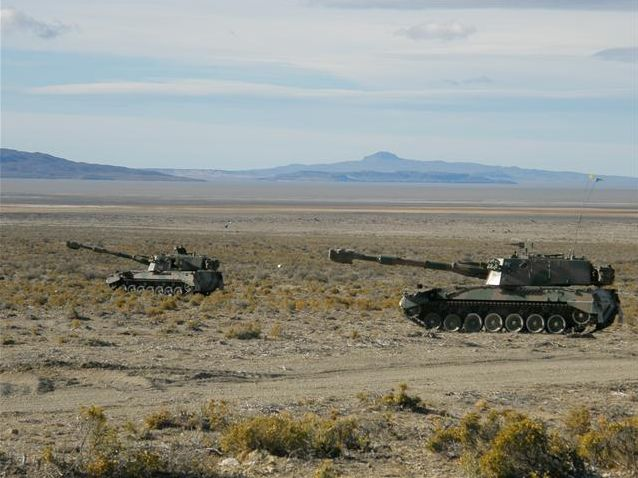
- VCA-155, TAM mated with a Palmaria turret
- Type: Self-propelled howitzer
- Place of origin: Italy

Service history
- Used by: See Operators
- Wars: Chadian–Libyan War; First Libyan Civil War; Second Libyan Civil War

Production history
- Produced: 1977–1986
- No. built: 235

Specifications
- Mass: 46,632 kg (102,590 lb)
- Length: 11.474 m (37 ft 8 in)
- Width: 2.35 m (7 ft 8 in)
- Height: 2.874 m (9 ft 5 in)
- Crew: 5
- Main armament: 155 mm L/41 howitzer (30 rounds)
- Secondary armament: 1x 7.62 mm or 12.7 mm machine gun in pintle mount
- Engine: MTU MB 837 8-cylinder diesel engine 750 PS (740 hp, 552 kW)
- Power/weight: 16.1 PS/tonne
- Suspension: torsion bar
- Operational range: 400 km (250 miles)
- Maximum speed: 60 km/h (37 mph)

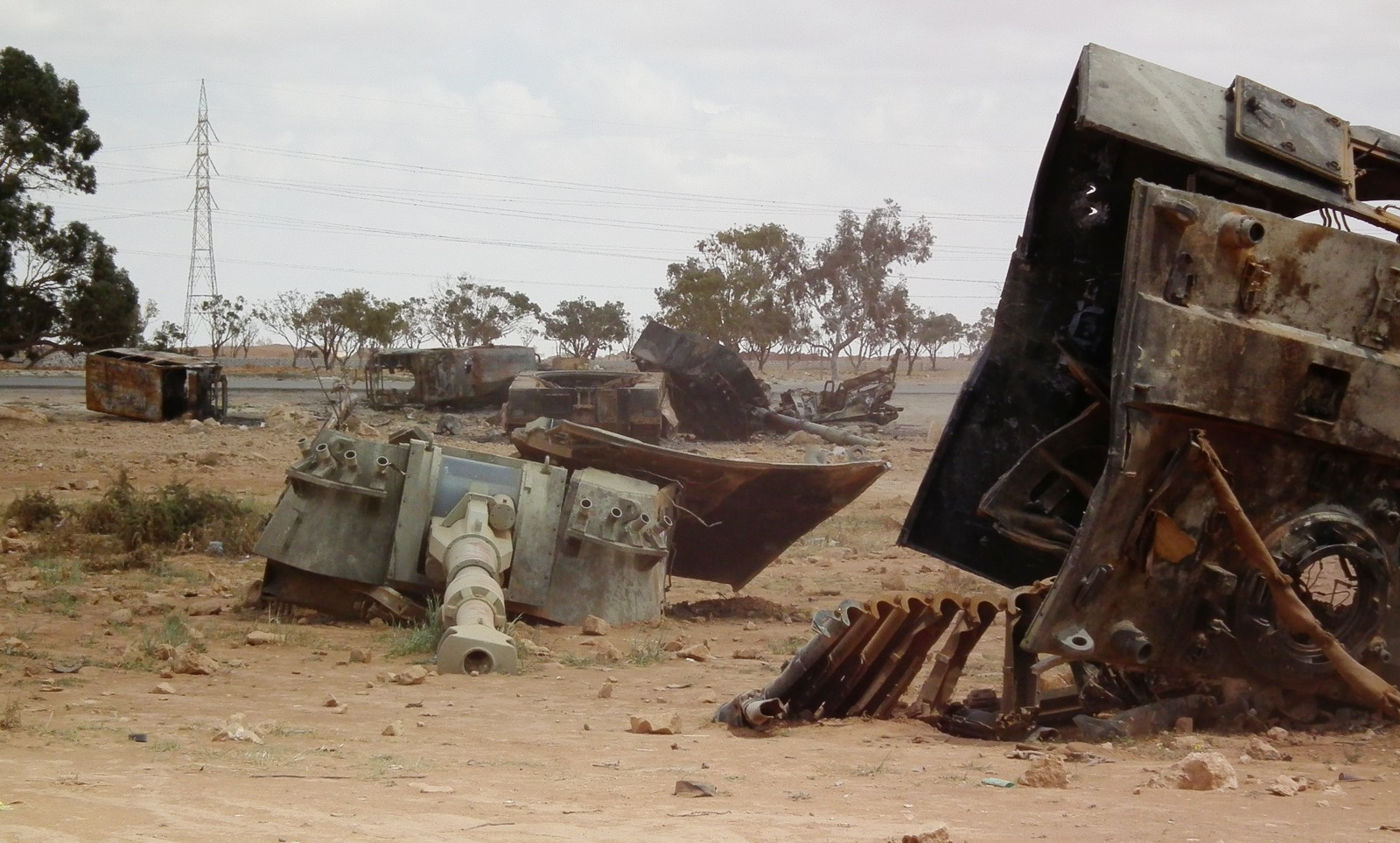
Palmarias of the Libyan Army, destroyed by French Air Force near Benghazi on March 19, 2011, in Opération Harmattan.

The Palmaria is an Italian self-propelled howitzer using the 155 mm (6.1″) NATO-standard artillery calibre.

== History ==
Developed by OTO Melara for the export market, the development of the Palmaria began in 1977, with the first prototype appearing in 1981.

== Design ==
The Palmaria's chassis is based on the OF-40 main battle tank.

The primary armament is a 155 mm howitzer, with a secondary 7.62 mm machine gun or 12.7 mm machine gun on anti-aircraft mount and four 76 mm forward-facing smoke grenade dischargers on either side of the turret. The howitzer has an automatic loading system, providing a rate of fire of one round every 15 seconds or a burst-fire rate of three rounds every 25 seconds. The loader has 23 ready rounds, with seven more rounds stored in the hull. Including manual reloading of the charge, the overall firing rate is normally one round per minute for one hour. Intense firing is four rounds in one minute. Sustained fire is one round every three minutes for an indefinite period. A wide variety of 155 mm munitions are available, including specially developed Simmel rounds with a range of 24.7 km and rocket-assisted ones with a range of 30 km.

The turret is hydraulic with manual backup, and has 360 degree rotation with elevation limits of -4 to +70 degrees. It has its own auxiliary power supply which conserves fuel for the main engine.

The Palmaria is powered by a 750 hp MTU MB 837 Ea-500 (or 1,000 hp Ka-500) 4-stroke, turbocharged, 8-cylinder multifuel engine coupled to a Renk RK 304 transmission. The Palmaria has torsion bar suspension with seven roadwheels and five return rollers on either side. The drive sprocket is located at the rear while the adjustable idler sprocket is at the front.

== Operational history ==
Libya was the first country outside Italy to adopt the Palmaria, initially ordering 210 in 1982. Their army's artillery strength in 2004 included 160 Palmaria. Several were destroyed during the First Libyan civil war as a result of multinational military intervention.

Other users include Nigeria, which took 25 Palmaria in 1982, and Argentina, taking the last 25 vehicles in 1986. Argentina mounted the Palmaria turrets onto TAM chassis as one possible replacement for their AMX-13 Mk. F-3 self-propelled guns. This vehicle became the TAM VCA Palmaria.

== Operators ==
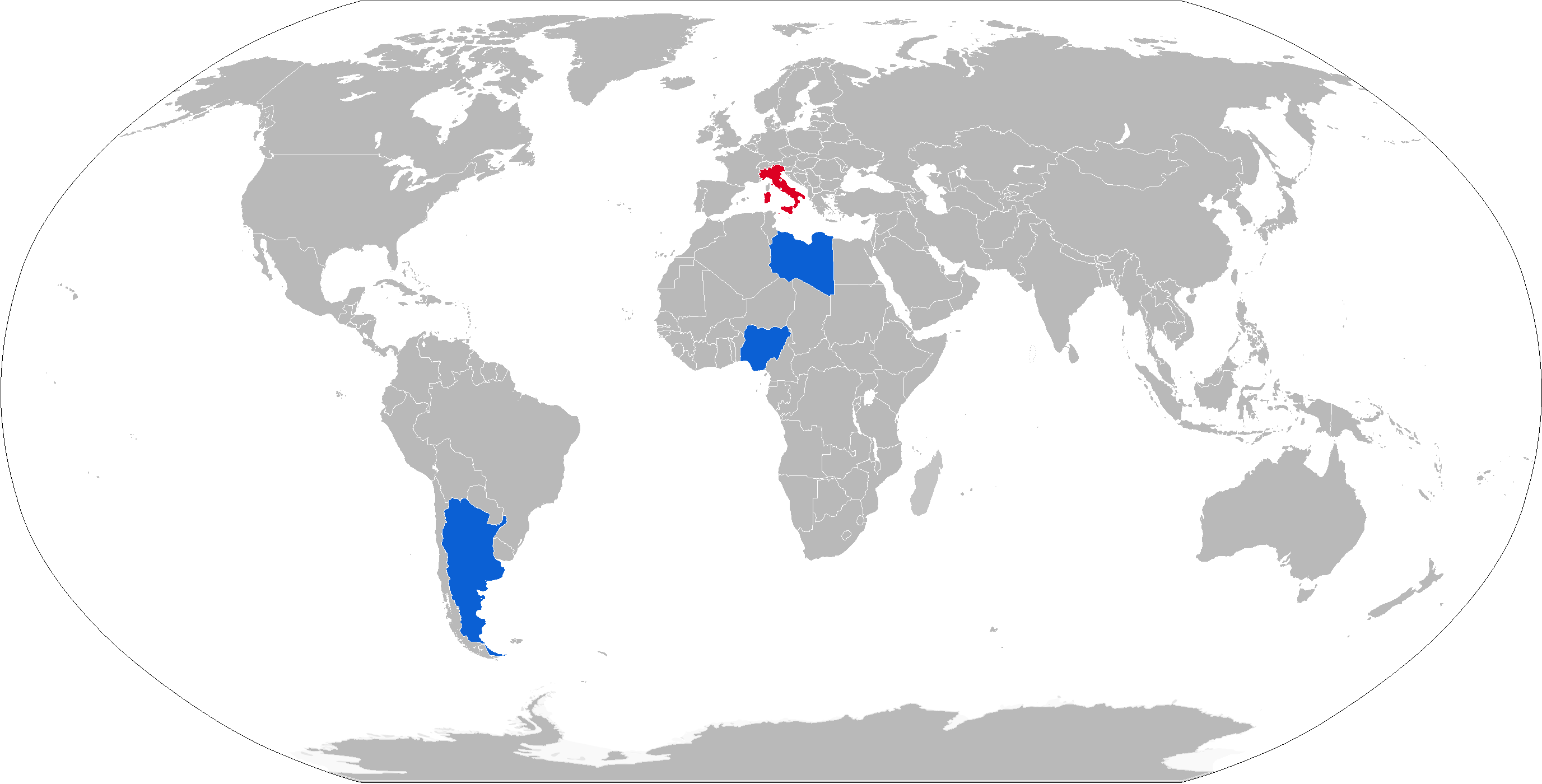
Map of Palmaria operators in blue

=== Current operators ===
- Argentina - Bought 20 Palmaria turrets in 1986, and integrated them into 17/18 TAM VCA chassis.
- Libya - Initially ordered 210 vehicles in 1982, had a count of 160 vehicles in 2004, several were destroyed during the 2011 Libyan civil war.
- Nigeria - Bought 25 vehicles in 1982.
