= Otomatic =

Otomatic SPAAG
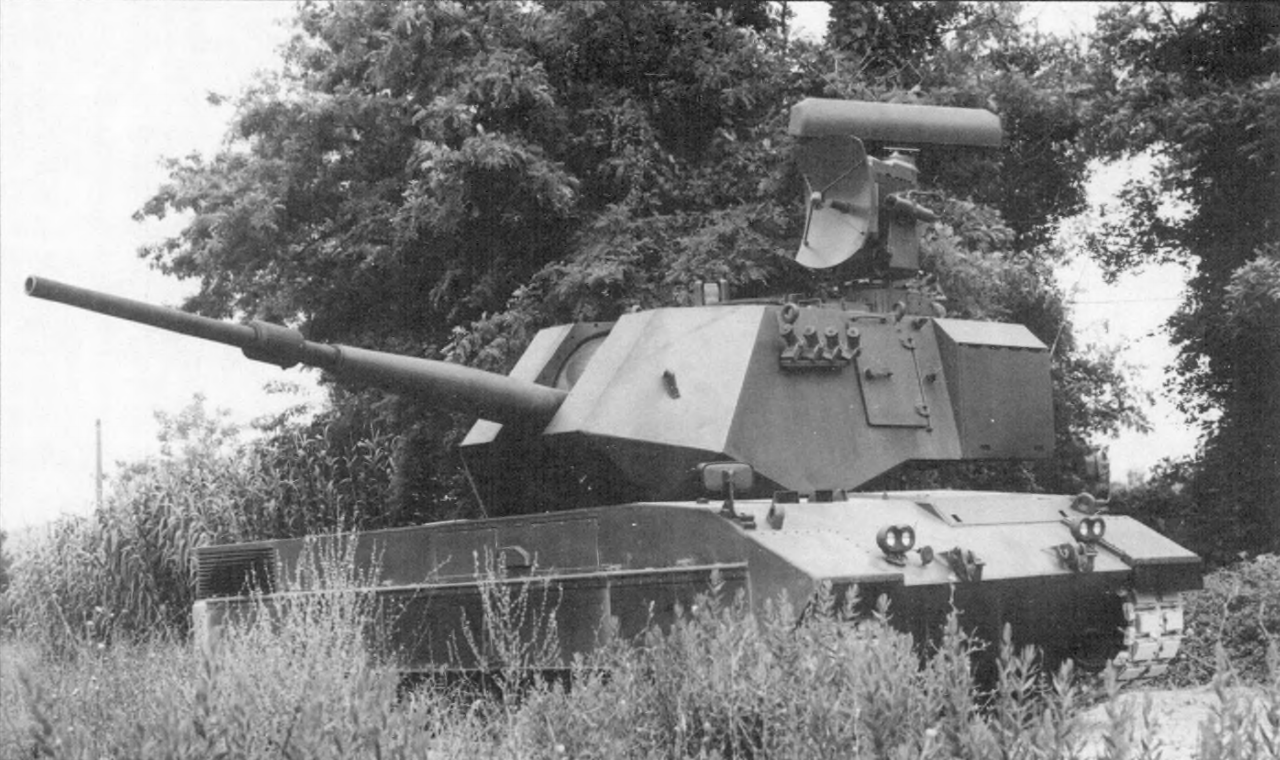
- Otomatic SPAAG
- Type: Self-propelled anti-aircraft gun
- Place of origin: Italy

Specifications
- Mass: 46.0 tonnes (101,400 lb)
- Length: Hull: 7.27 metres (23 ft 10 in)
- Width: 3.71 m (12 ft 2 in)
- Height: 3.07m (10ft 1in)
- Crew: 4
- Main armament: 1× OTO Melara 76 mm derived autocannon with 70 rounds
- Secondary armament: 8x Smoke grenade launchers
- Engine: MTU MB 837 Ka-500 diesel engine 750 hp (560 kW)
- Power/weight: 16.3 hp / 1 tonne
- Suspension: Torsion bar suspension
- Operational range: 500 kilometres (310 mi)
- Maximum speed: 65 km/h (40 mph)

The OTO main anti-aircraft tank for intercept and combat (dubbed Otomatic, a play on automatic) was an Italian self-propelled anti-aircraft gun (SPAAG) prototype. Designed and built by OTO Melara, it was armed with a single 76 mm naval gun.

== Design and development ==
The design combined the chassis of an OF-40, with a new turret mounting the Otobreda 76 mm gun along with associated search and targeting radars and their fire control systems: an S search radar SMA VPS-A05, with around 15 km range against aircraft and 8 km against helicopters in hovering; and a fire control unit SMA VPG-A06 (Ka band). It also included an optical fire-control system with periscopes for search and aiming, with a laser range-finder. The whole turret was built of steel (roughly with the same thickness of the one used in early Leopard 1s) and weighed 15 tonnes. OTO Melara offered it as a long-range SPAAG that could outperform systems like the Gepard and similar versions with the British Marksman turret that mounted much smaller, but rapid-fire, 35 mm guns.

The gun could also be useful against lighter armored vehicles or older generation tanks. The barrel was strengthened in order to hold greater pressures, so it can fire not only HE, but also APFSDS ammunition. The Otomatic was never put into production because the already widespread presence of anti-aircraft missiles reduced the need for a long-range AA gun on the modern battlefield. Still, it is much cheaper to fire a proximity-fused high-caliber shell versus a cheap ISR UAV or single use UAV, compared to launching an anti air missile.

The Italian army needed another turret used with a Leopard 1 chassis (the turret was to be adaptable into many 40 ton vehicles, like the Leopard or the OF-40), but the amalgamation never happened, as the SIDAM 25 quad 25 mm gun was already in production and, despite being inferior and not all-weather, almost 300 SIDAMs were bought. The need for 60-80 OTOMATIC never materialised, and the Italian army was even evaluating using a L70 Bofors with a Leopard 1 as a stopgap measure. This was also not adopted, as it was too limited for a 1990s anti-aircraft self-propelled gun.

OTOMATIC therefore had no orders by the Italian army, as both SIDAM and Skyguard Aspide were already in order with very high costs, coupled with the Stinger missiles, the upgraded HAWK and the coming MEADS missiles. No orders were received from foreign customers either, despite the 76 mm gun being already well known and widespread in many navies around the world.

OTO-Melara attempted to revive the concept with the AMRAD ("Artillery Multi-Role Area Defense"), which had a much lighter mounting, and which was intended for use on a variety of wheeled vehicles. In order to lower the weight of the system, the turret's armor was reduced and the radars were removed and replaced with an optical-only aiming system cued by a remote radar. Despite these changes, the AMRAD failed to sell.

The Centauro Draco can be considered to be a further development of the Otomatic, as the Draco utilises the same weapon mounted in a lighter turret on a wheeled chassis, along with a more compact radar system.

== See also ==
- JRVG-1
