= Tanque Argentino Mediano =

Argentine medium tank

Tanque Argentino Mediano (TAM)
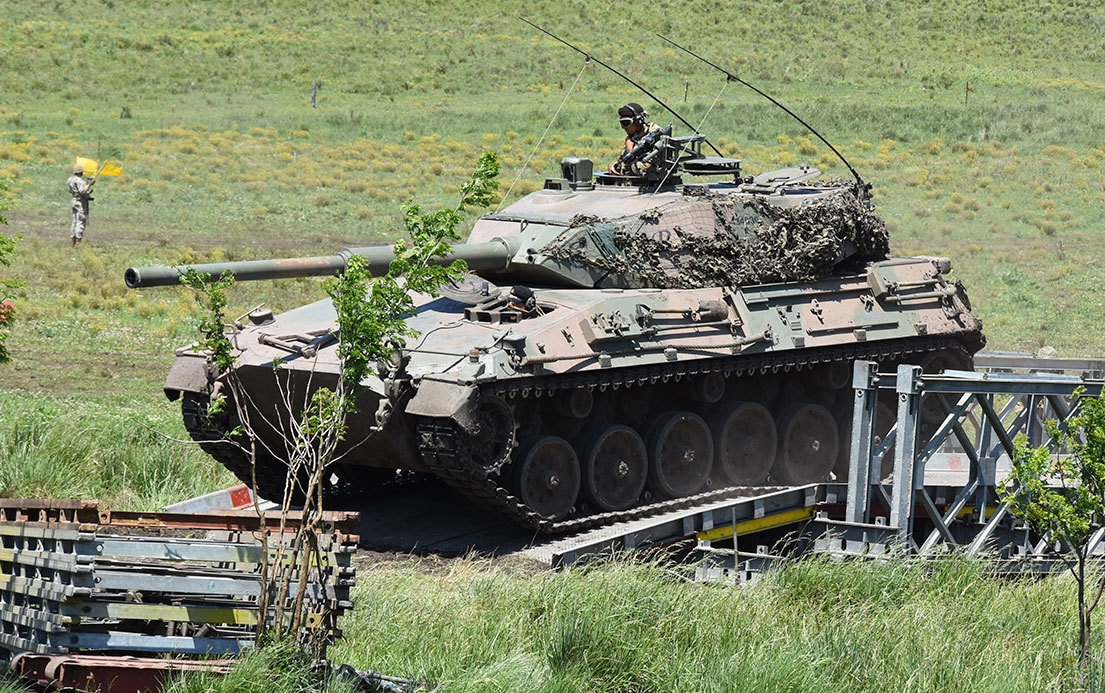
- Argentine Army TAM from 1st Armored Brigade
- Type: Light main battle tank / Medium tank
- Place of origin: Argentina / West Germany

Service history
- In service: 1983–present
- Used by: Argentina

Production history
- Unit cost: 1,500,000 USD (1983 export price)
- Produced: 1979–1991, 1994–1995
- No. built: 280

Specifications
- Mass: 30.5 t (30.0 long tons; 33.6 short tons)
- Length: 6.75 m (22 ft 2 in)
- Width: 3.25 m (10 ft 8 in)
- Height: 2.42 m (7 ft 11 in)
- Crew: 4
- Armor: 50 mm (hull front and sides); 50 mm (turret front)
- Main armament: 105 mm (4.13 in) FM K.4 Modelo 1L
- Secondary armament: 2×7.62 mm (0.30 in) machine gun
- Engine: MTU-MB 833 Ka-500 6-cylinder 22.4 L (1,370 cu in) diesel 540 kW (720 hp)
- Power/weight: 24 hp/tonne
- Suspension: Torsion-bar
- Operational range: 590 km (370 mi), 800 km (500 mi) with auxiliary fuel tanks
- Maximum speed: 75 km/h (47 mph)

The Tanque Argentino Mediano (TAM) is a family of armoured vehicles developed by the Argentine company TAMSE for the Argentine Military in 1970, it entered service in 1979. Although originally intended as a tank, different variants have been developed.

The TAM met the Argentine Army's requirement for a modern, lightweight and fast tank with a low silhouette and sufficient firepower to defeat contemporary armored threats. Development began in 1974 and resulted in the construction of three prototypes by early 1977 and full-scale production by 1979. Assembly took place at the local 9,600-square-meter (103,000 sq ft) TAMSE plant, founded for the purpose by the Argentine government. Economic difficulties halted production in 1983, but manufacturing began anew in 1994 until the army's order of 200 tanks was fulfilled.

The TAM series includes seven different variants, such as a 155 mm (6.1-inch) self-propelled howitzer and a mortar carrier vehicle. In total, over 280 such vehicles were built, including armored personnel carriers, artillery and mortar pieces. The TAM and VCTP (Infantry Fighting Vehicles based on the TAM chassis) were manufactured for the Peruvian Army, only to be integrated into the Argentine Army when Peru canceled the contract. The TAM also competed for other export orders, but the TAM was ultimately not exported.

The TAM has never seen combat, although 17 VCTPs were deployed to Croatia for the United Nations UNPROFOR peacekeeping mission.

== Development ==
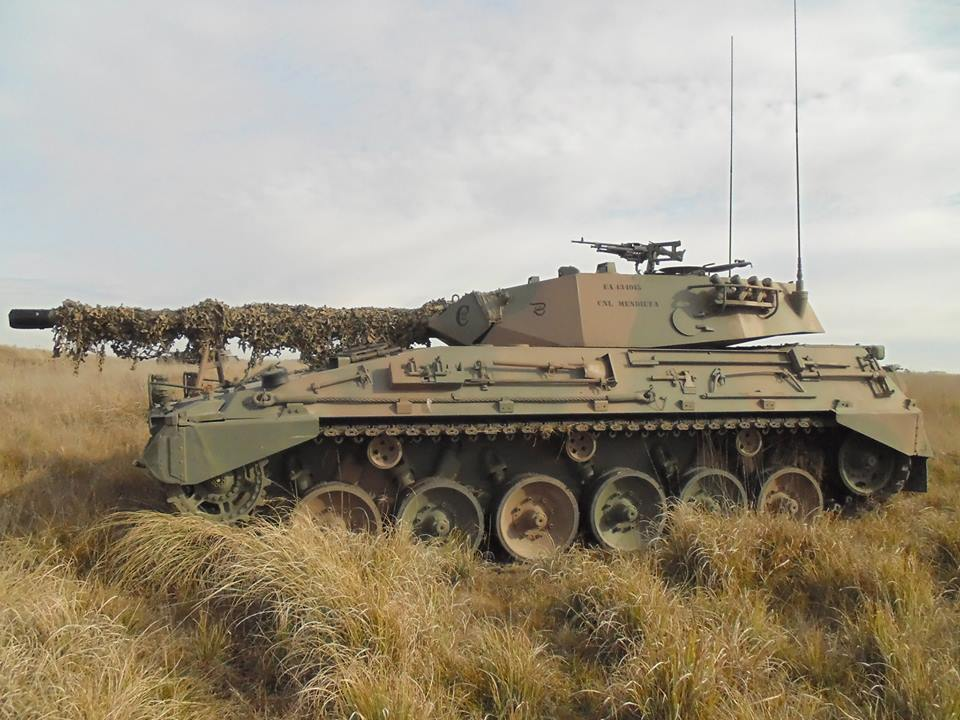
Left view of a TAM

During the 1960s Argentina sought to replace its aging fleet of tanks, which included British Sherman V Firefly tanks and American M3A1 half-tracks dating from shortly after the Second World War. In their attempts to procure equipment from the United States, Argentina could only secure 50 M41 Walker Bulldogs (undelivered) and 250 M113 armored personnel carriers. When the United States turned down requests for further equipment, the Argentine government turned to the other side of the Atlantic, putting their "Plan Europa" (Plan Europe) into action. It was hoped that European technology could stimulate Argentine industry so the country could produce its own armaments in the future. Argentina procured 80 AMX-13 light tanks, as well as 180 AMX-VCIs and 24 AMX-155 F3s, from the French government, manufacturing around 40 AMX-13s and 60 AMX-VCIs at home. The French AMX-30 and German Leopard 1 were also examined as possible replacements for the Argentine Sherman fleet.

In 1973 the Argentine Ministry of Defense drew up a series of requirements for a tank to enter service in the 1980s. The armored vehicle would weigh no more than 30 tonnes (29.5 long tons; 33.1 short tons), move at a maximum speed of 70 km/h (43 mph), and cover at least 500 km (310 mi) on roads. It would be armed with a modern 105 mm main gun, two machine guns, and grenade launchers. The tank designers also had to take into account Argentina's existing infrastructure, including railroad capacity, bridges and road capacity, as well as the country's varied terrain. In late 1973 the Proyecto de Tanque Argentino Mediano (Argentine Medium Tank Project) was founded with the goal of designing and developing a tank for the Argentine Army. Lacking the experience and the necessary technology, the Argentine government sought collaboration with a foreign company, resulting in a contract with the German company Thyssen-Henschel. The contract called for a transfer of technology resulting in a program to develop a tank in line with the government's requirements and under a technical team that included both German and Argentine engineers. The hull of the German Marder armored personnel carrier was used, and the chassis was strengthened to support the increased weight of the TAM. Two prototypes were manufactured in late 1976 and early 1977, which were put through extensive testing for two years and over a road range of 10,000 km (6,200 mi). Simultaneously, another prototype was manufactured to further the investigation of the new vehicle and complete the three prototypes as agreed in the contract.

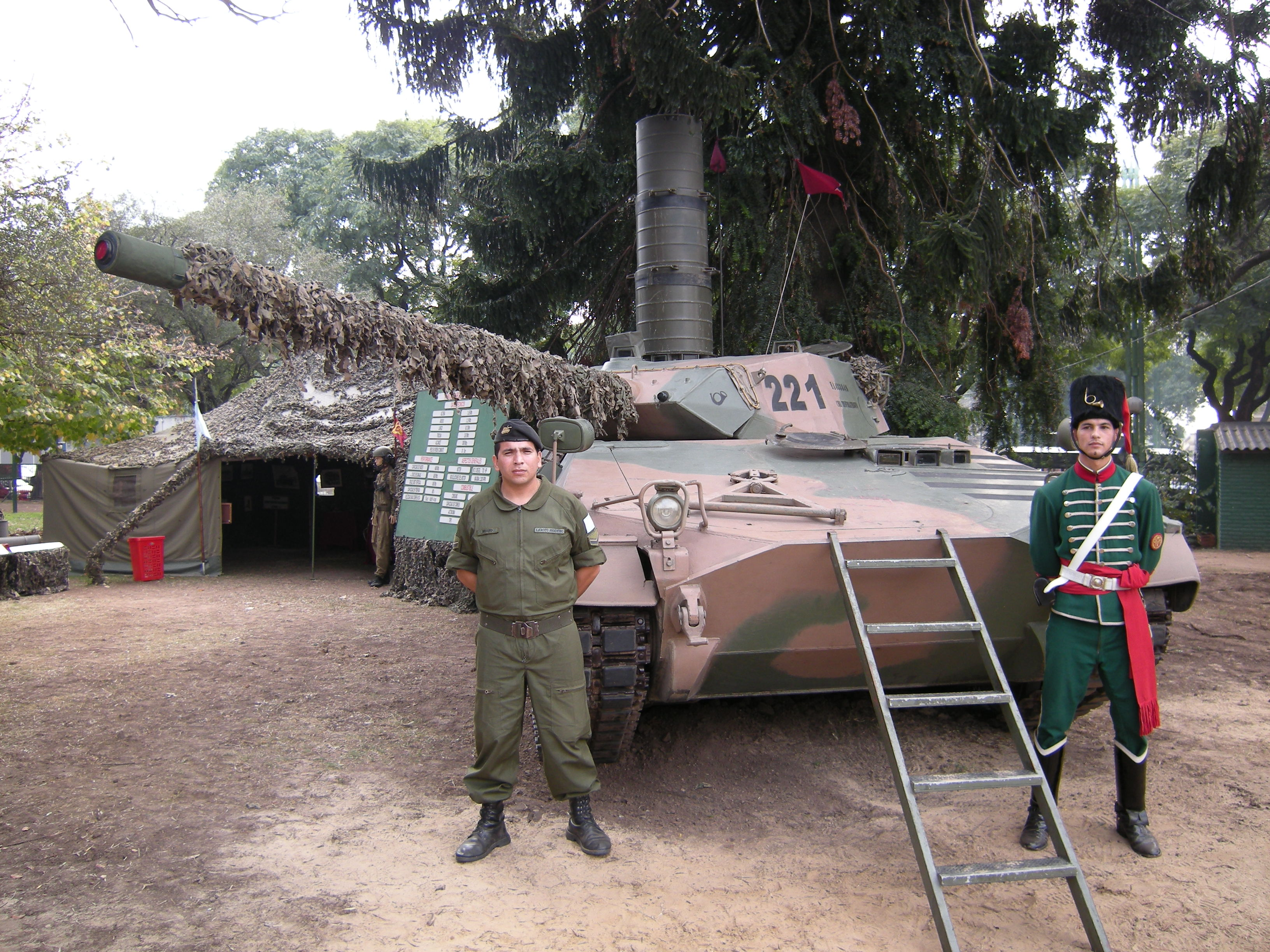
TAM with its snorkel installed during an Argentine Army exposition

The new tank's firepower requirements were met by fitting a British Royal Ordnance L7A1 105 mm (4.13-inch) main gun. This gun was later replaced by the modified L7A2 and finally by Rheinmetall's Rh-105-30 105 mm (4.13-inch) gun. This gun is manufactured in Argentina as the FM K.4 Modelo 1L. The Rh-105-30's advantages include low weight, compact size and increased lethality. Unlike the Rh-105-30, the FM K.4 does not have a muzzle brake. The locally built cannon can be elevated to 18 degrees or depressed to -7 degrees on the TAM. The gun's hydraulic recoil mechanism has an extended length of 580 mm (22.8 inches) to absorb the 34-tonne (33-long-ton; 37-short-ton) recoil force. It is designed to fire the M735A1 armor-piercing fin-stabilized discarding sabot, which can penetrate a maximum of 370 mm (14.6 inches) at 1,000 meters (1,100 yd). It can also fire high-explosive anti-tank rounds, high-explosive squash head and smoke rounds. The tank's secondary armaments include a co-axial 7.62 mm (0.30-inch) FN MAG 60-40 general purpose machine gun and a second FN MAG 60-20 mounted on the TAM's turret roof as an anti-aircraft machine gun. The fire control system includes a Nd:YAG laser with a range of 9,900 meters (32,480 ft) and a FLER-HG ballistic computer to compute the gun's fire solutions—helping the gunner aim and hit the target. The tank commander uses a Zeiss PERI-R/TA panoramic periscope, with a 2× and 8× zoom.

The TAM's engine requirements included low weight and volume, but with a fast rate of acceleration and high reliability. The program chose MTU's MB-833 Ka 500 diesel engine, producing 540 kW (720 hp) at 2,400 rpm. This gives the TAM a power-to-weight ratio of 24 horsepower per tonne and a maximum speed of 75 km/h (47 mph) on road and 40 km/h (25 mph) off-road. With a 680-liter (180-U.S.-gallon; 150-imperial-gallon) internal fuel tank, the TAM can travel 500 km (310 mi). Its range is extended to 900 kilometers (560 mi) if the vehicle is equipped with two 200-liter (53 U.S. gal; 44 imp gal) external fuel tanks. The TAM's transmission is a Renk HSWL-204 automatic, with a hydrodynamic torque converter. A double brake system includes hydraulic disk brakes on the roadwheels, and the suspension is a torsion bar.

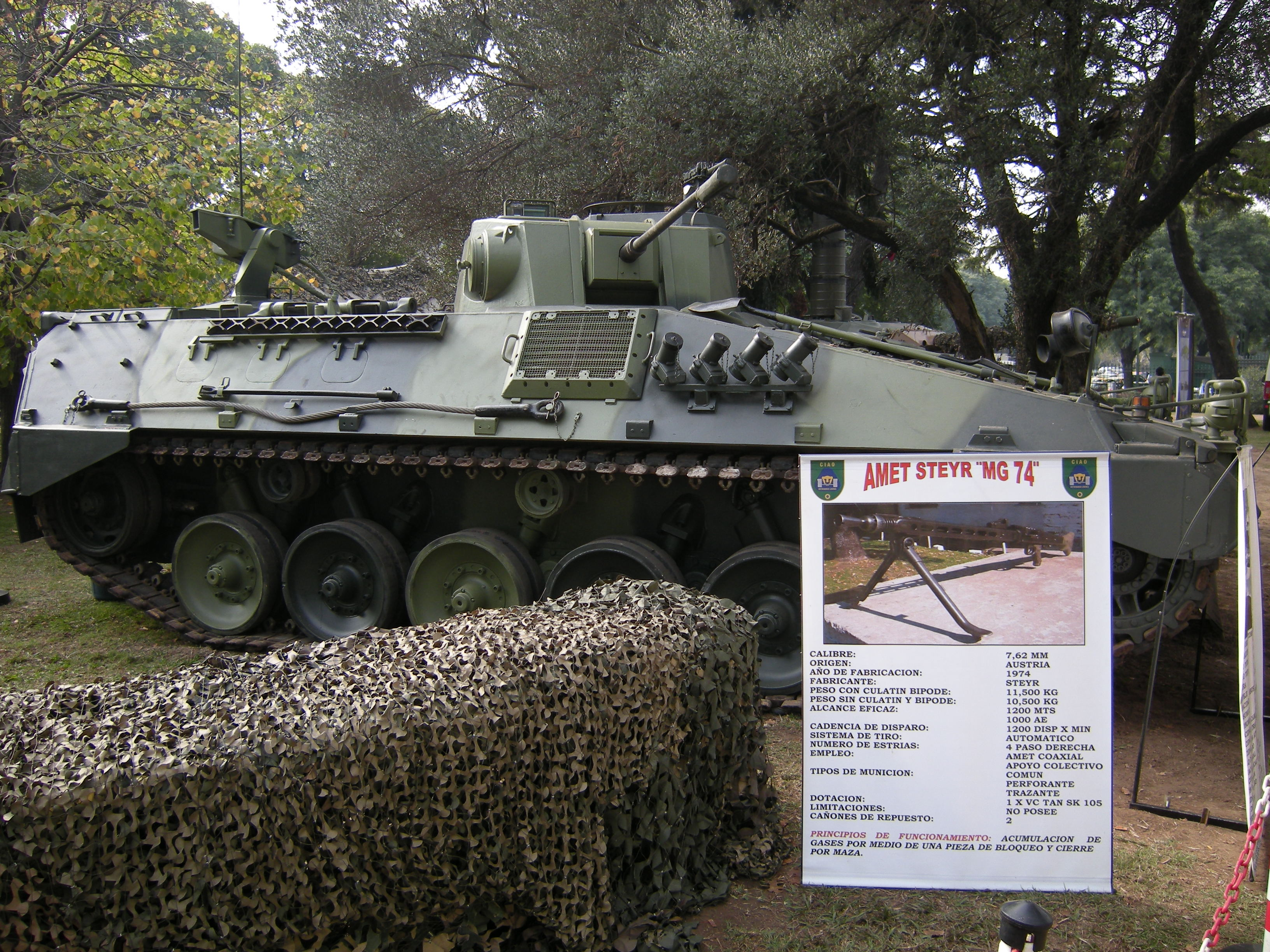
A TAM VCTP, May 2008

The TAM's survivability is related to its low profile turret, based on that of the Leopard 1A4s and the Leopard 2, and its physical armor array. It has 50 mm (1.97 inches) at 75 degrees on the glacis plate and 32 degrees on the vehicle's sides. This offers protection against anti-armor shells from up to 35 mm (1.38-inch) guns. The turret front is protected by 50 mm (1.97 in) of steel armor at an angle of 32 degrees. Although the tank's weight and armor protection are light compared to other main battle tanks, it has the advantage of better tactical mobility over the nation's terrain.

As a private venture, Thyssen-Henschel built a fourth prototype designated TH 301. Completed in 1978, it added a PERI R12 periscope, originally designed for the Leopard 1A4, for the tank commander. The gunner and loader each received a day periscope as well. To enable the crew to fire effectively at night, a low light level television (LLLTV) camera, which moved in elevation with the main gun, was fitted to the mantlet. Furthermore, the tank received a more powerful 550 kW (750 metric horsepower) engine. The improvement program also made provisions to increase the thickness of the armor for additional protection.

== Production ==
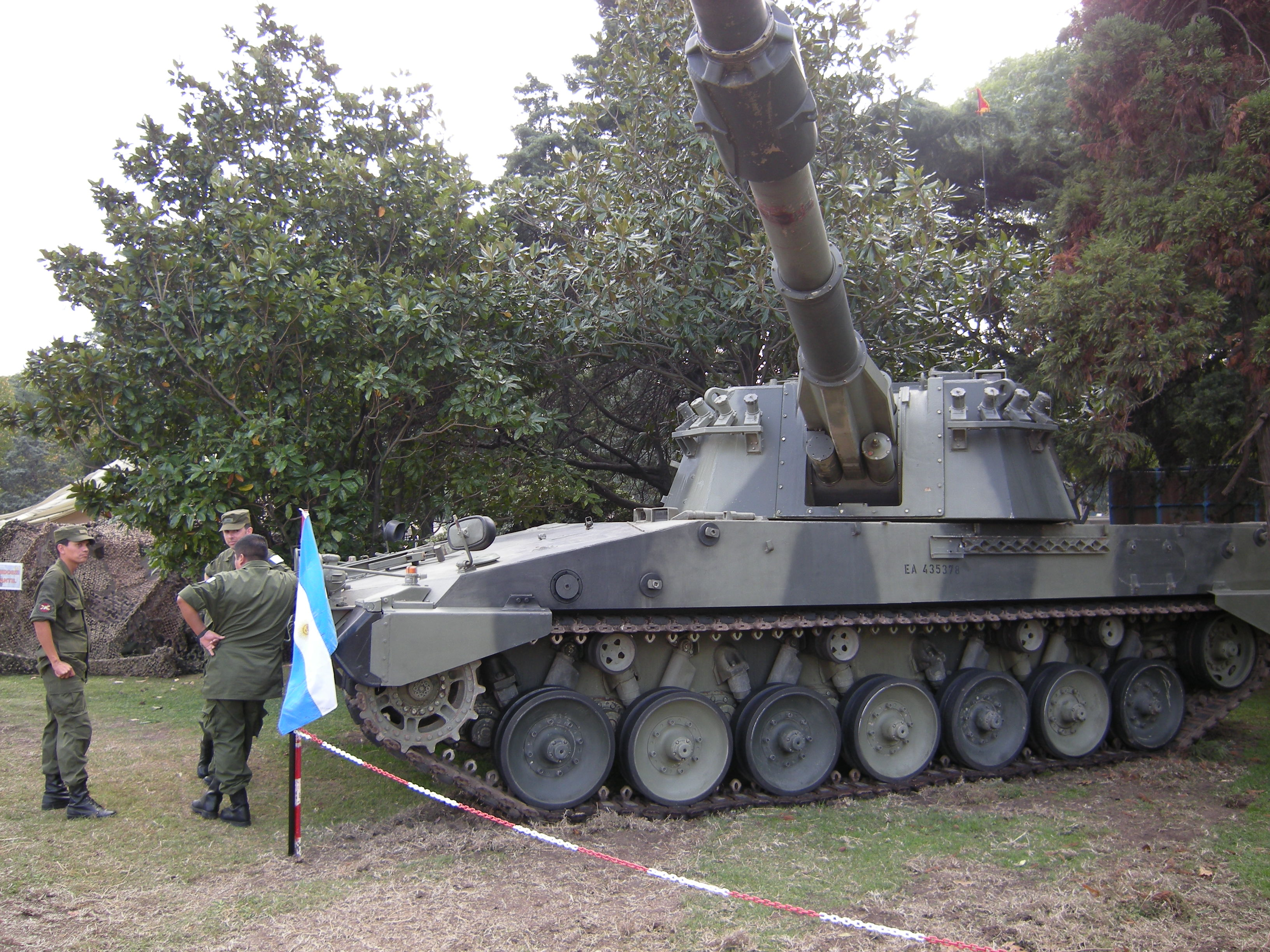
A TAM VCA 155 Palmaria

Production began in 1979, with the intent to build a total of 512 armored vehicles (200 tanks and 312 VCTP infantry fighting vehicles). Economic problems, however, ended production in 1983 with only 150 TAMs and 100 VCTPs built. These vehicles were produced by an Argentine company, Tanque Argentino Mediano Sociedad del Estado (or TAMSE) founded by the government in March 1980. 70% of the TAM's components were manufactured in Argentina, while the 30% manufactured in Germany corresponded to the transmission, optics and fire control system. In 1983, 20 TAMs and 26 VCTPs were delivered to the Argentine Army after an original order of 80 TAMs by Peru was canceled due to budgetary issues. In 1991, TAMSE and the TAM production line were shut down, although in 1994 TAMSE was reactivated to complete an order for 120 of both TAMs and VCTPs to replace the M4 Shermans in the 2nd Armored Cavalry Brigade of the Argentine Army. By 1995 the Argentine Army was equipped with 200 TAM tanks and 216 VCTP and VCPC armored vehicles. Although 25 VCA-155s were originally planned for production starting in 1990, only 19 were completed and delivered by 1995, along with 50 VCTMs. No other variants of the TAM, including the VCLC, VCA and VCRT were put into production due to budget restrictions.

The TAMSE plant is a 9,600-square-meter (103,300 sq ft) facility. The factory is completely covered, with two warehouses for storing components, quality control laboratories, a project office, an engine test room and a firing range. Also participating in the production of TAM and variant components were Argentine companies Military Factories General San Martín (manufacturing the chassis), Río Tercero (turret and armament) and Bator Cocchis, S.A.

== Export and operational history ==
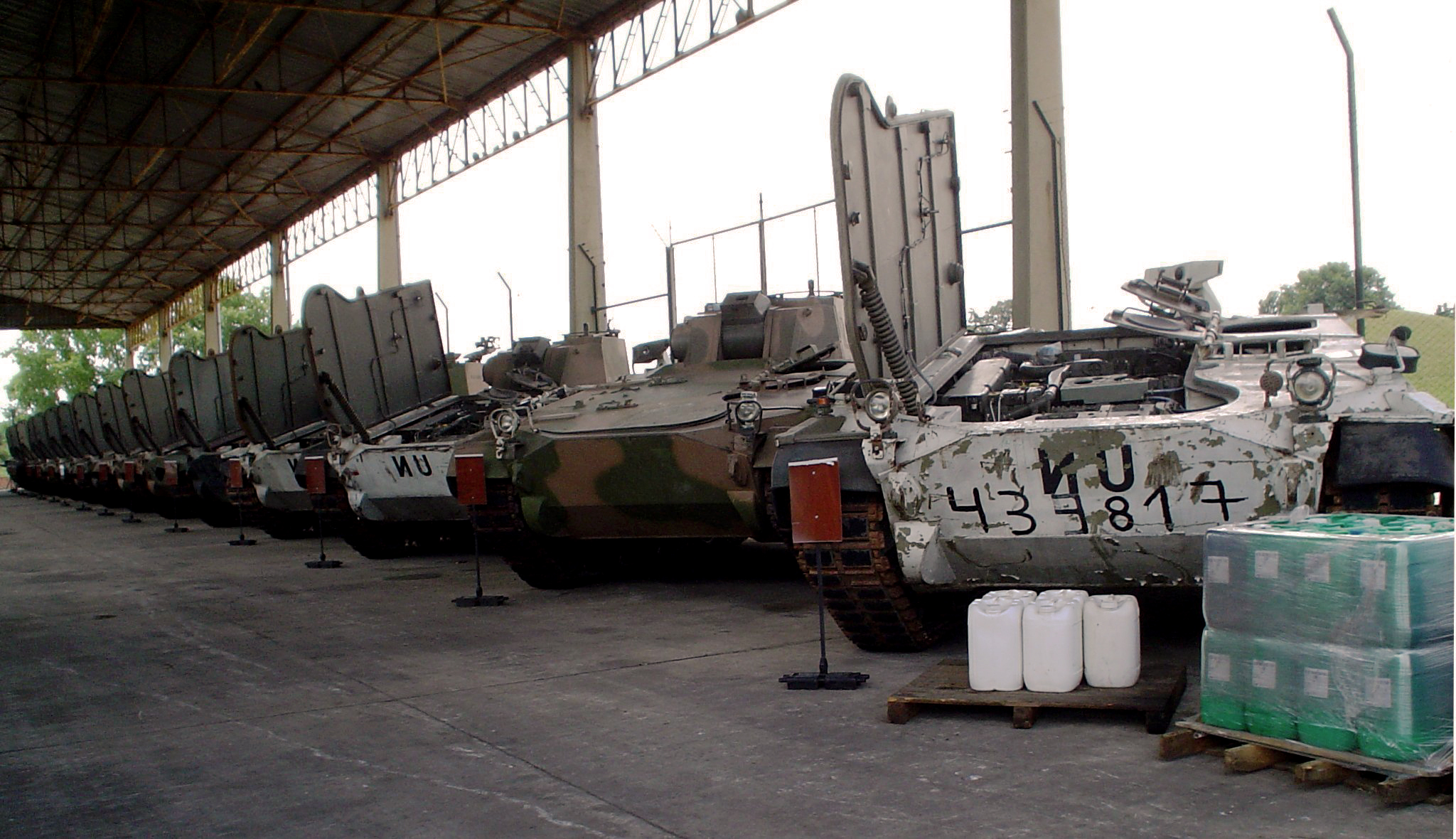
Argentine VCTPs during peacekeeping operations in Croatia

The TAM vehicle family has never seen combat, although it has been deployed on peacekeeping operations. A number of countries have considered acquiring the vehicles, although none have ever been exported.

In 1981, even before the TAM entered service with Argentina, Malaysia signed a contract with the TAMSE company for 102 vehicles, comprising the TAM and its VCTP and VCRT derivatives, which would have been known in Malaysian service as the Lion, Tiger and Elephant, respectively. For a variety of factors, none of these vehicles could be delivered as scheduled and the order was cancelled. (Malaysia chose instead to procure Poland's PT-91.)

The TAM had not entered service in Argentina when the Malvinas/Falklands War of 1982 began. The Argentine Army did not deploy its existing AMX-13 tanks, deeming them unsuited to the boggy off-road conditions in the Malvinas Islands. Panhard AML armoured cars were deployed, for on-road fire support.

In mid-1983, Peru placed a contract for 80 TAMs. Due to budgetary problems the order was canceled after 20 tanks had been completed. A similar order was established by Panama in 1984, and was canceled as well. In 1989 the TAM competed in a tank procurement order from Ecuador, alongside the US Stingray light tank, the Austrian SK-105 Kürassier and the French AMX-13. The TAM achieved 950 out of 1,000 points, while its closest competitor earned 750 points, but in the end Ecuador did not procure any of the vehicles presented.

In the Middle East, both Saudi Arabia and Iran expressed interest in the TAM. The Saudi Arabian deal was scrapped after Israel successfully appealed to Germany to block the use of its technology. The Iranian deal also fell through after both Iraq and Saudi Arabia appealed to Germany. TAMSE subsequently attempted to sell 60 already completed vehicles to Iran, using a Panamanian company, Agrometal, as an intermediary – the company was to receive a 10% commission. After TAMSE reduced the price of the vehicles, the Iranian government lost confidence in the deal and canceled it.

During the 1990s, an Argentine battalion deployed to Yugoslavia as part of United Nations peacekeeping operations was accompanied by 17 VCTPs.

In 1995, with no further export orders likely, the Argentine government permanently halted production and the factory was closed.

== Variants ==
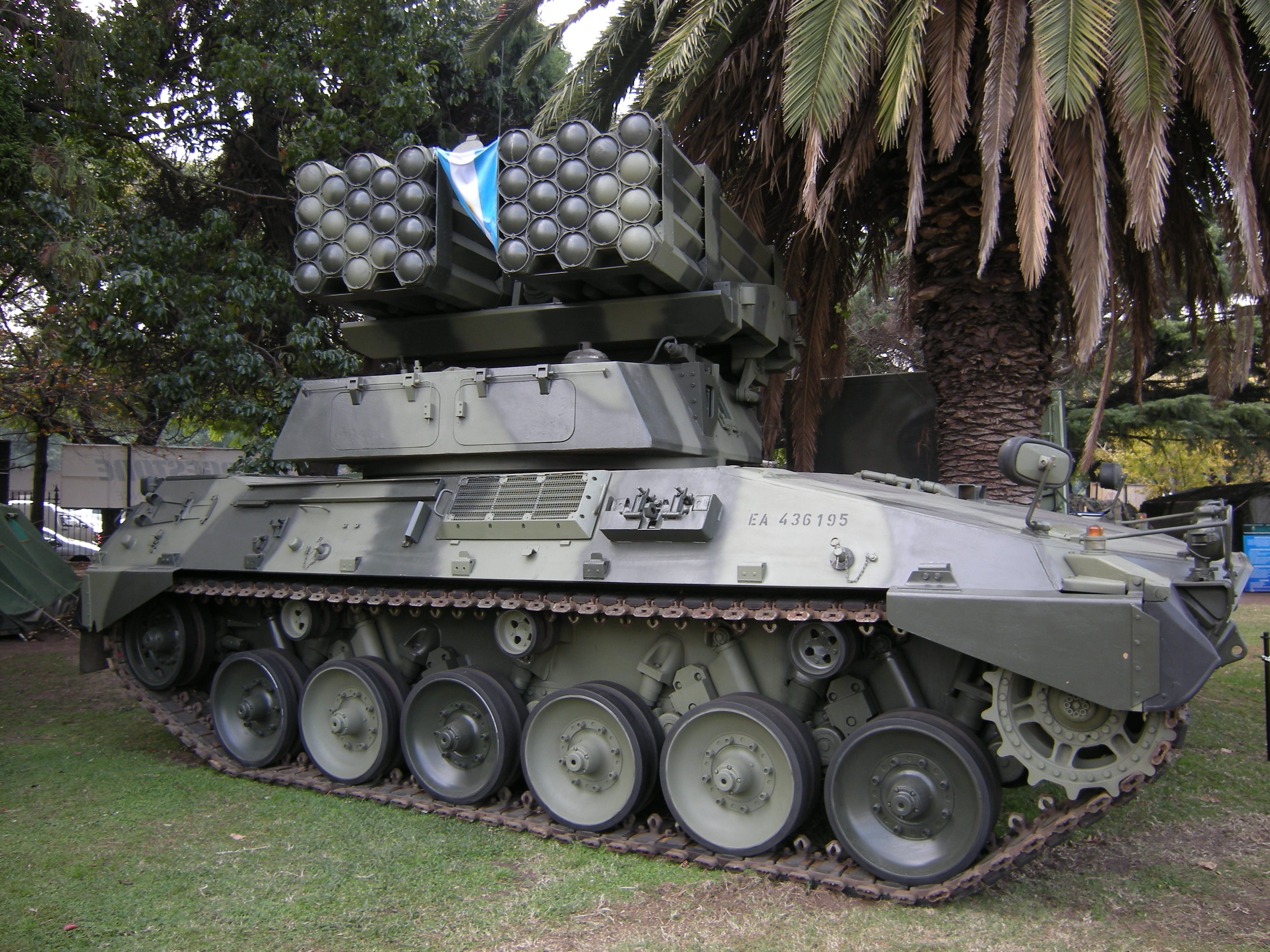
VCLC during the Argentine Army Exhibition in 2008

A number of variants were built on the same chassis as the TAM tank. The original program called for the design of an infantry fighting vehicle, and in 1977 the program finished manufacturing the prototype of the Vehículo de Combate Transporte de Personal (Personnel Transport Combat Vehicle), or VCTP. The VCTP is able to transport a squad of 12 men, including the squad leader and nine riflemen. The squad leader is situated in the turret of the vehicle; one rifleman sits behind him and another six are seated in the chassis, the eighth manning the hull machine gun and the ninth situated in the turret with the gunner. All personnel can fire their weapons from inside the vehicle, and the VCTP's turret is armed with Rheinmetall's Rh-202 20 mm (0.79-inch) autocannon. The VCTP holds 880 rounds for the autocannon, including subcaliber armor-piercing DM63 rounds. It is also armed with a 7.62 mm FN MAG 60-20 machine gun mounted on the turret roof. Infantry can dismount through a door on the rear of the hull. The commander has a day sight and seven observation periscopes, while the gunner has a day sight and three observation periscopes.

Variants also include the Vehículo de Combate de Artillería de 155 mm (155 mm Artillery Combat Vehicle), or VCA 155, and the Vehículo de Combate Transporte de Mortero (Mortar Transport Combat Vehicle), or VCTM. The VCA-155 is an elongated TAM chassis fitted with Oto Melara's Palmaria 155 mm (6.1-inch) self-propelled howitzer turret. It carries 28 projectiles, 23 of which are stored in the turret bustle. The VCTM carries an AM-50 120 mm (4.7-inch) internal mortar, which has a range of 9,500 meters (31,167.98 ft) and a rate of fire of 8 to 12 shots per minute. Based on the TAM chassis, the Vehículo de Combate Puesto de Mando (command combat vehicle), or VCPC, is another variant designed in 1982. The Vehículo de Combate Lanzacohetes (Rocket launcher combat vehicle), or VCLC, designed in 1986, is also based on the TAM chassis and can be fitted with both 160 mm (6.3-inch) and 350 mm (13.8-inch) rockets. A combat ambulance, Vehículo de Combate Ambulancia (VCA), and an armored recovery vehicle, Vehículo de Combate de Recuperación (VCRT) are other combat variants of the tank.

TAM variants
	VCTP	VCA 155	VCTM	VCPC	VCLC	VCA	VCRT
Type	Infantry fighting vehicle	Self-propelled howitzer	Self-propelled mortar	Command vehicle	Multiple rocket launcher	Armored ambulance	Armored recovery vehicle
Weight	28.2 t (31.1 tons)	40 t (44.1 tons)	26 t (28.7 tons)	25 t (27.6 tons)	32 t (35.3 tons)	28 t (30.9 tons)	32 t (35.3 tons)
Armament	20 mm (.79 in) Rh-202 autocannon	155 mm (6.1 in) L/41 howitzer	120 mm (4.72 in) mortar	7.62 mm (0.3 in.) FN MAG 60-20 machine gun	160 mm (6.3 in.) or 350 mm (13.8 in.) rockets	None	7.62 mm (0.3 in) FN MAG 60-20 machine gun
Road range	590 km (370 mi)	520 km (320 mi)	520 km (320 mi)	520 km (320 mi)	520 km (320 mi)	520 km (320 mi)	520 km (320 mi)
Power-to-weight ratio	24 hp/t (23 hp/ton)	18 hp/t (16.5 hp/ton)	28.8 hp/t (25.1 hp/ton)	28.8 hp/t (25.1 hp/ton)	22.5 hp/t (20.4 hp/ton)	26.7 hp/t (23.3 hp/ton)	22.5 hp/t (20.4 hp/ton)
Maximum speed on road	75 km/h (47 mph)	55 km/h (34 mph)	75 km/h (47 mph)	75 km/h (47 mph)	75 km/h (47 mph)	75 km/h (47 mph)	75 km/h (47 mph)

=== TAM S 21 ===
In 2002, a program for a modernised TAM 'for the 21st century' began. This program sought, above all, to modernise the fire control system and other electronic systems. The TAM S 21 was equipped with an Israeli thermal sight, allowing the vehicle to better perform at night or in adverse weather conditions. The vehicle also saw the addition of a GPS, as well as extended battery performance. 20 upgraded vehicles were planned, but only 6 vehicles had been built before the project was cancelled.

=== TAM 2C ===
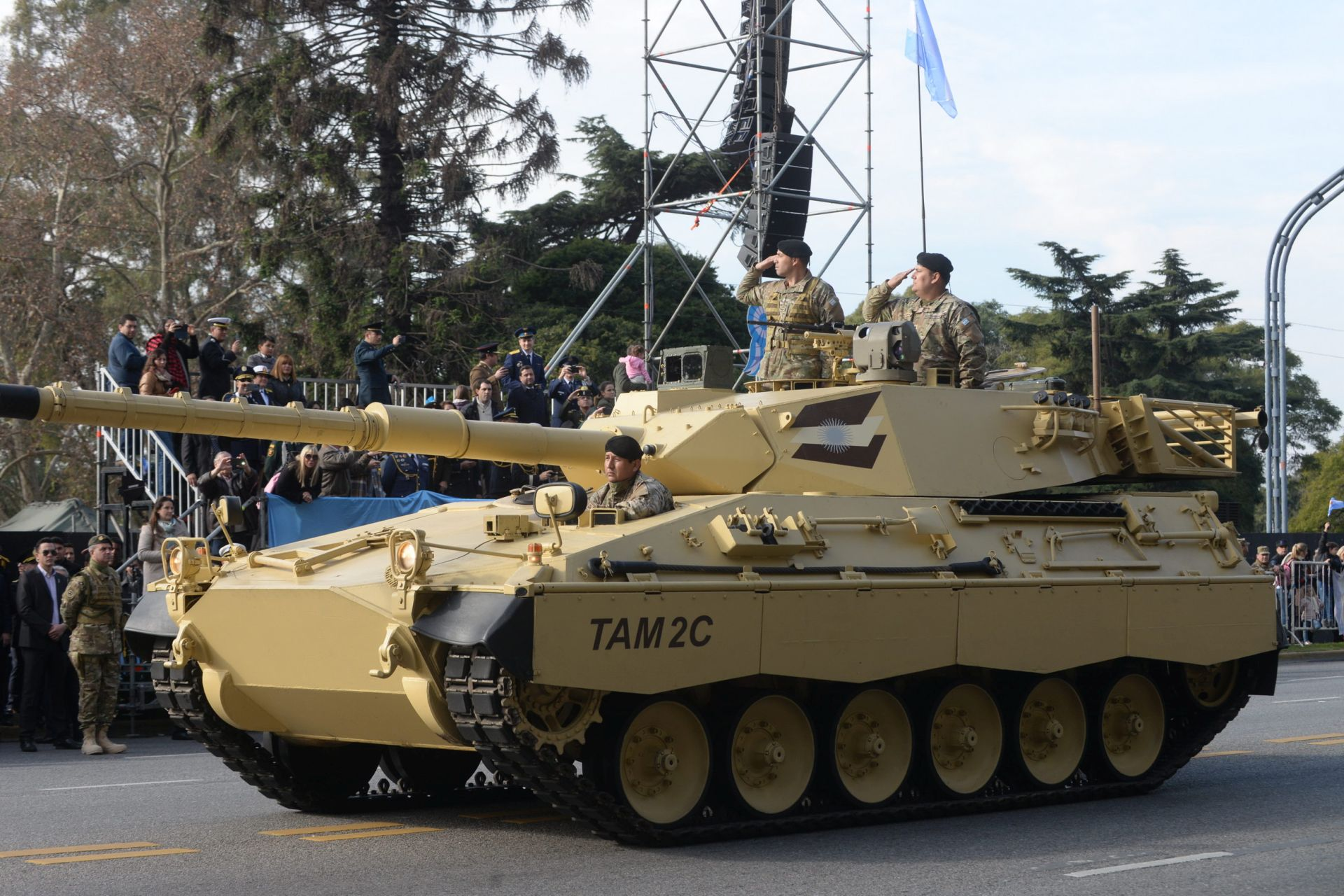
TAM 2C on Independence Day parade

In 2010, a modernization program was announced. Israeli defense contractor Elbit Systems was chosen to provide 3-axis gyro-stabilization. The first TAM unit upgraded by Elbit Systems was delivered in March 2013. The TAM 2C was upgraded with many features, mainly revolving around electronics and other secondary features. The upgrades included a thermal imager for the gunner and commander, a thermal sleeve for the barrel, and an auxiliary power unit to provide power to critical systems when the main engine is off and reduce fuel consumption while idling. The TAM 2C also had numerous firepower upgrades, including new APFSDS shells and a new HEAT shell, and the capability to fire LAHAT anti-tank guided missiles, with over 800 mm of penetration and 8 km range. It is not known whether or not the Argentinian government will purchase such missiles. The TAM 2C also received a new turret storage basket.

=== TAM 2IP ===
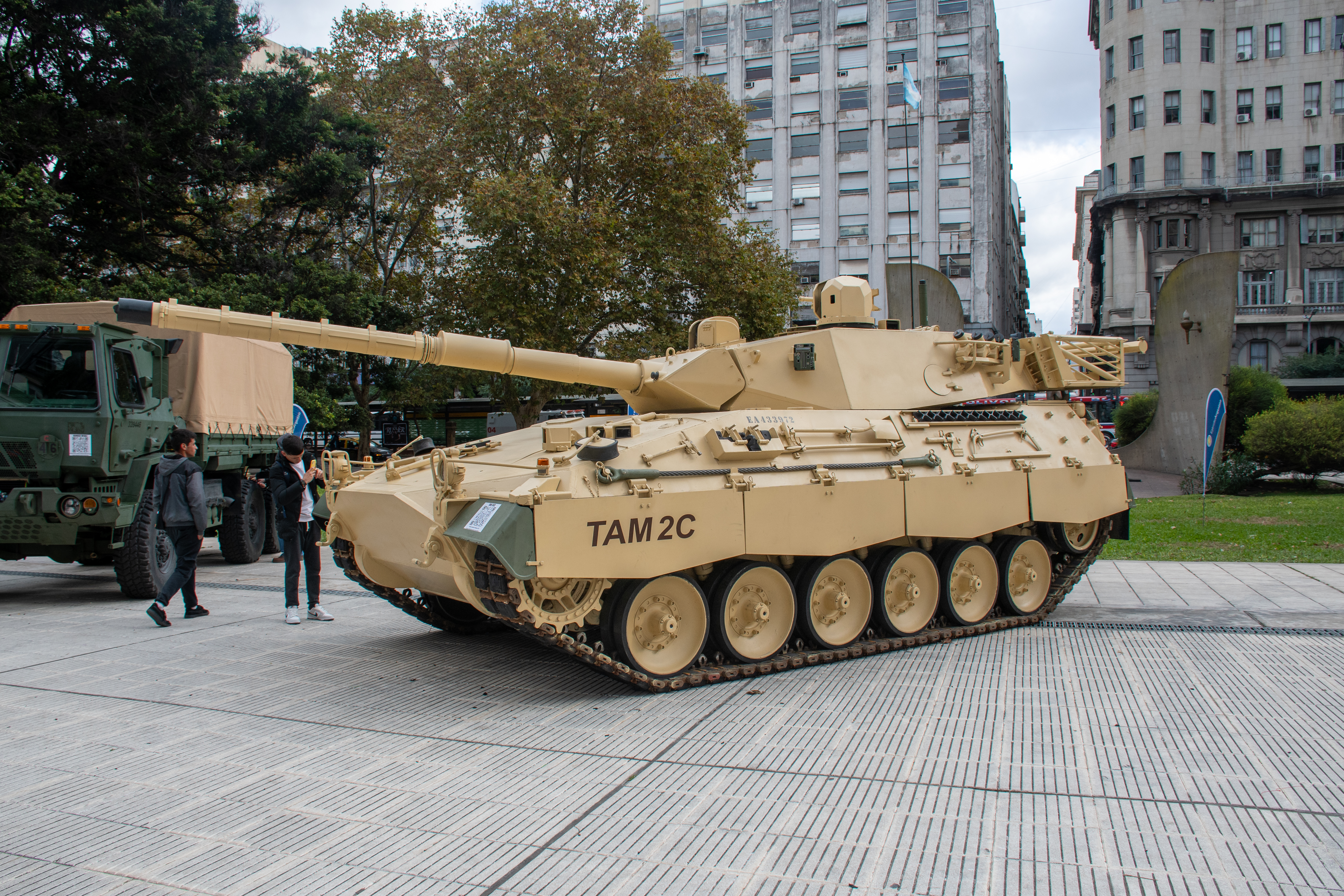
TAM 2C.

In 2016, Elbit Systems unveiled a new prototype variant of the TAM, called the TAM 2IP (Improved Protection). While the TAM 2IP lacked the upgraded FCS and optics as seen on the previous TAM 2C, the tank was upgraded with new passive composite armour, across the front and sides of the turret and the front hull. This armour was based on the IMI Iron Wall design.

=== TAM 2C-A2 ===
The TAM 2C-A2 is a further prototype of the TAM 2C unveiled in May 2023, currently undergoing testing by the Argentine Army. It integrates upgraded electronics and optics to the ones present on the 2C. The gunner's sight has been replaced by a system similar to the COAPS (Commander Open Architecture Panoramic Sight) from Elbit Systems, featuring day and night sights, greater ease for long-distance target acquisition, improved sensors and thermal sights, amongst others. The 2C-A2 also adds a hunter-killer system for the commander, allowing them to automatically track targets independently of the gunner. 74 TAM and TAM 2C vehicles are expected to be upgraded to the TAM 2C-A2 within a period of 7 years (to 2030).

== Users ==
Argentina

- Argentine Army
