= Leopard 1 =

Main battle tank family of German origin

Kampfpanzer Leopard 1
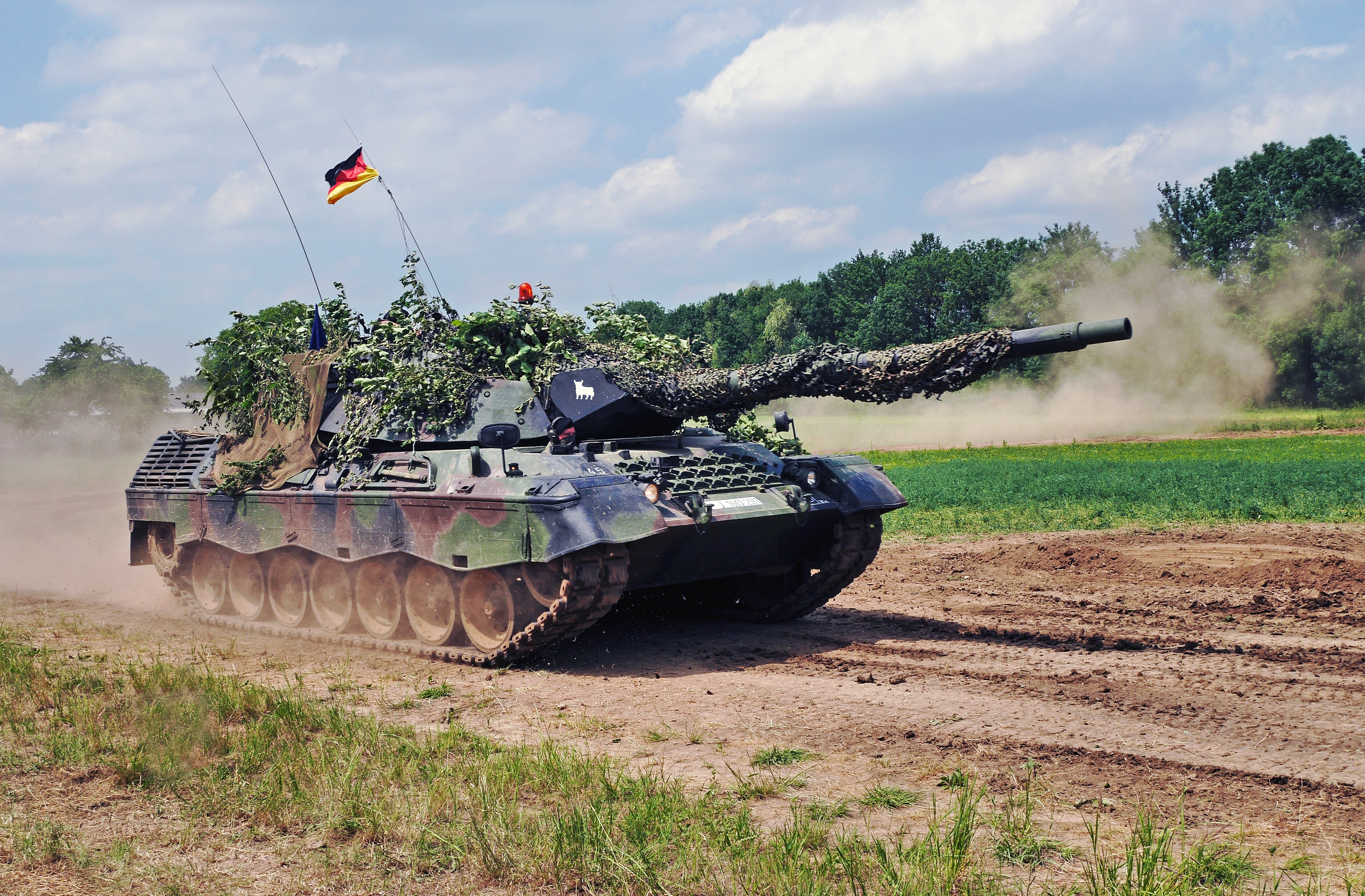
- German Leopard 1A5 at the 2015 Military Day in Uffenheim
- Type: Main battle tank
- Place of origin: West Germany

Service history
- In service: 1965–present
- Wars: Yugoslav Wars; Bosnian War; Kurdish–Turkish conflict; War in Afghanistan; Russo-Ukrainian War; Russian invasion of Ukraine

Production history
- Designer: Porsche
- Designed: 1956–1961
- Manufacturer: KraussMaffei; OTO Melara
- Produced: 1965–1984
- No. built: 6,565 4,744 main battle tanks 1,741 utility and anti-aircraft vehicles 80 prototypes and pre-series vehicles

Specifications
- Mass: 42.2 tonnes (increased on later models from original 40 tonnes)
- Length: 9.54/8.29 m (gun forward/rearward)
- Width: 3.37 m (11.1 ft)
- Height: 2.39/2.7 m (turret roof/absolute)
- Crew: 4 (commander, driver, gunner, radio operator/loader)
- Armour: Steel: 10–70 mm (0.39–2.76 in) RHAe
- Main armament: 1 × 105 mm Royal Ordnance L7A3 L/52 rifled gun (13 rounds in turret 42 rounds in hull)
- Secondary armament: 2 × 7.62 mm MG 3 or FN MAG (co-axial and commander's hatch) (5500 rounds)
- Engine: MTU MB 838 CaM 500, 10-cylinder, 37.4 litres, multi-fuel engine 830 PS (820 hp; 610 kW) at 2,200 RPM
- Power/weight: 19.6 PS (19.3 hp; 14.4 kW)/tonne
- Suspension: Torsion bar
- Operational range: 600 km (370 mi) (on road), 450 km (280 mi) (cross-country)
- Maximum speed: 65 km/h (40 mph)

The Kampfpanzer Leopard, subsequently Leopard 1 following the introduction of the successive Leopard 2, is a main battle tank designed by Porsche, and manufactured by Krauss-Maffei in West Germany, that entered service in 1965. Developed in an era when HEAT warheads were thought to make conventional heavy armour of limited value, the Leopard design focused on effective firepower and mobility instead of heavy protection. It featured moderate armour, only effective against low caliber autocannons and heavy machine guns, giving it a high power-to-weight ratio. This, coupled with a modern suspension and drivetrain, gave the Leopard superior mobility and cross-country performance compared to most other main battle tanks of the era, only being rivaled by the French AMX-30 and Swedish Strv 103.

The main armament of the Leopard consists of a German license-built version of the British Royal Ordnance L7 105 mm rifled gun, one of the most effective and widespread tank guns of the era.

The design started as a collaborative project during the 1950s between West Germany and France, and later joined by Italy, but the partnership ended shortly after and the final design was ordered by the Bundeswehr, with full-scale production starting in 1965. In total, 6,485 Leopard tanks have been built, of which 4,744 were battle tanks and 1,741 were utility and anti-aircraft variants, not including 80 prototypes and pre-series vehicles.

The Leopard quickly became a standard of many European militaries, and eventually served as the main battle tank in over a dozen countries worldwide, with West Germany, Italy and the Netherlands being the largest operators until their retirement. Since 1990, the Leopard 1 has gradually been relegated to secondary roles in most armies. In the German Army, the Leopard 1 was completely phased out in 2003 by the Leopard 2, while Leopard 1-based vehicles are still widely used in utility roles.

The Leopard 2 has replaced the Leopard 1 in service with many other nations, with derived vehicles using the Leopard 1 hull still seeing service. Currently, the largest operators are Greece, with 520 vehicles, Turkey, with 397 vehicles, Brazil with 378 vehicles and Chile with 202 vehicles. Most of these vehicles have been upgraded with various improvements to armour, firepower and sensors to maintain their ability to engage modern threats.

== Development ==
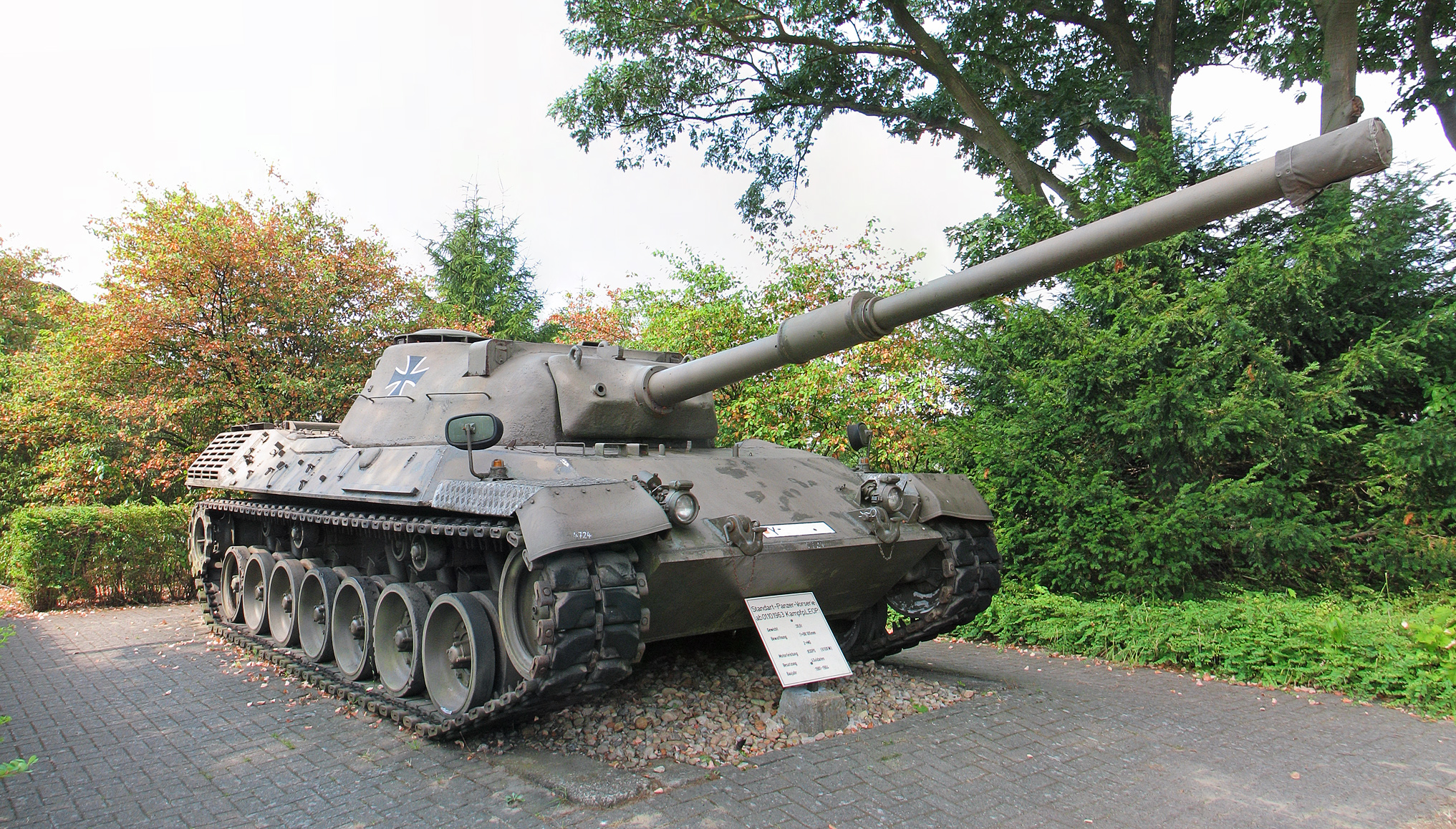
A Leopard 1 Prototype II

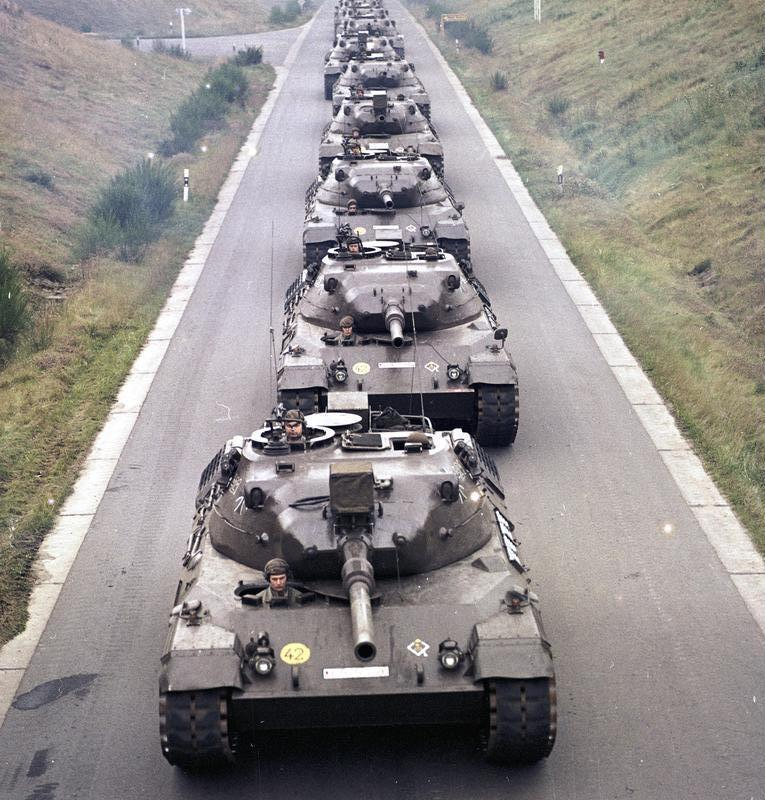
Several early Leopard tanks (0-series prototypes) preparing for parade duty, distinguished by the centrally-mounted IR/white searchlight and rectangular loader's hatch.

The Leopard project started in November 1956 in order to develop a modern tank, the Standard-Panzer, to replace the Bundeswehr's American-built M47 and M48 Patton tanks, which, though just delivered to West Germany's recently reconstituted army, were rapidly becoming outdated. On 25 July 1957, the detailed specifications were released. The new design needed to weigh no more than 30 tonnes, have a power-to-weight ratio of 30 horsepower per tonne, be able to withstand hits by 20 mm rapid-fire guns on every side as well as to operate in a battlefield contaminated with chemical weapons or radioactive fallout, the then-standard baseline for combat with the Warsaw Pact.

The main armament had to consist of a 105 mm caliber weapon (the new British L7A3 105 mm gun was selected), carrying at least as many rounds as current US tank designs. Mobility had priority, while firepower came second. Armour was seen as less essential, as it was believed that no real protection against hollow charge weapons was possible anyway. At the time it was suspected that future conflicts would involve nuclear weapons, which no tank at the time could directly protect from.

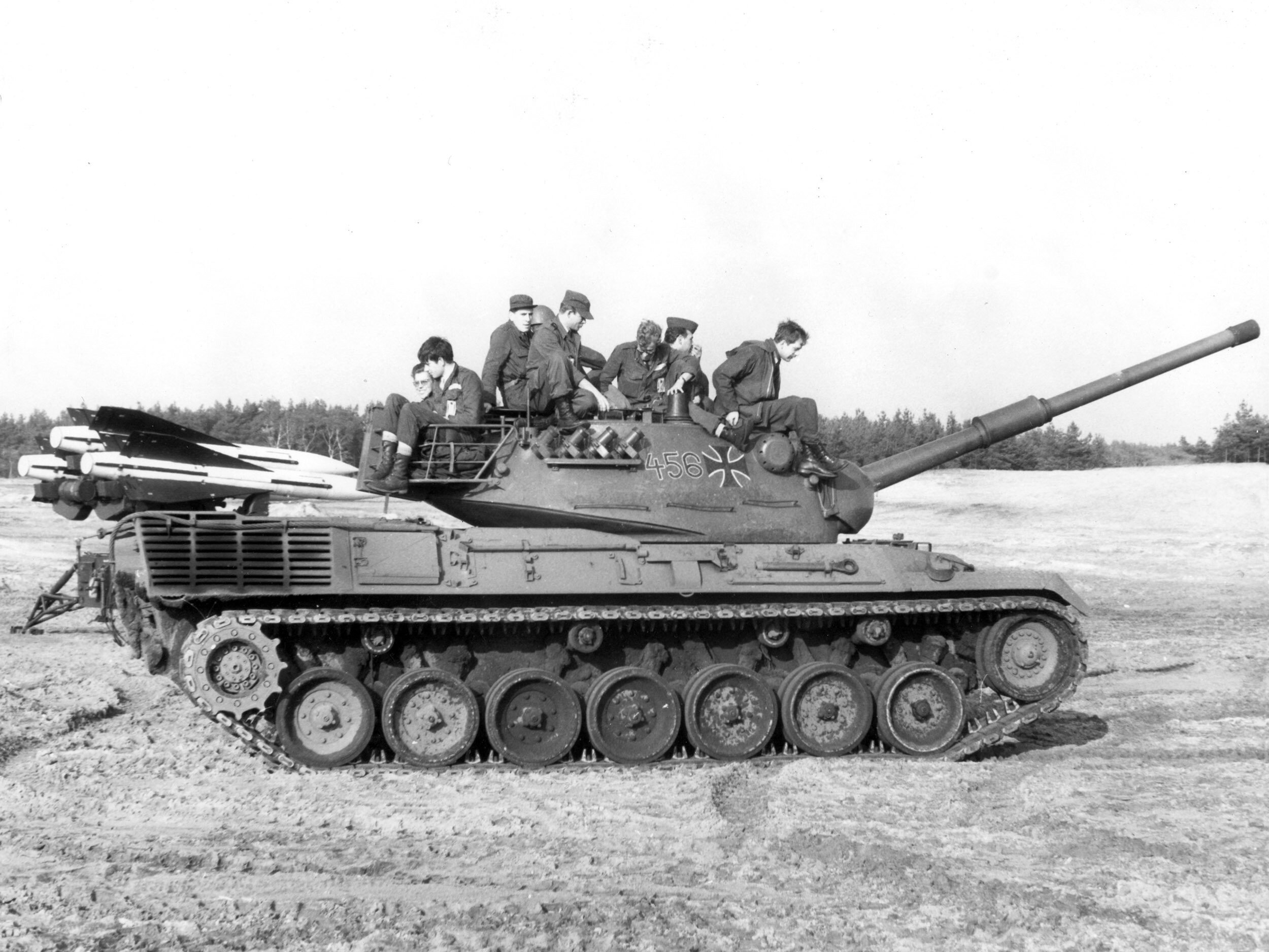
Bundeswehr Leopard 1 in 1967

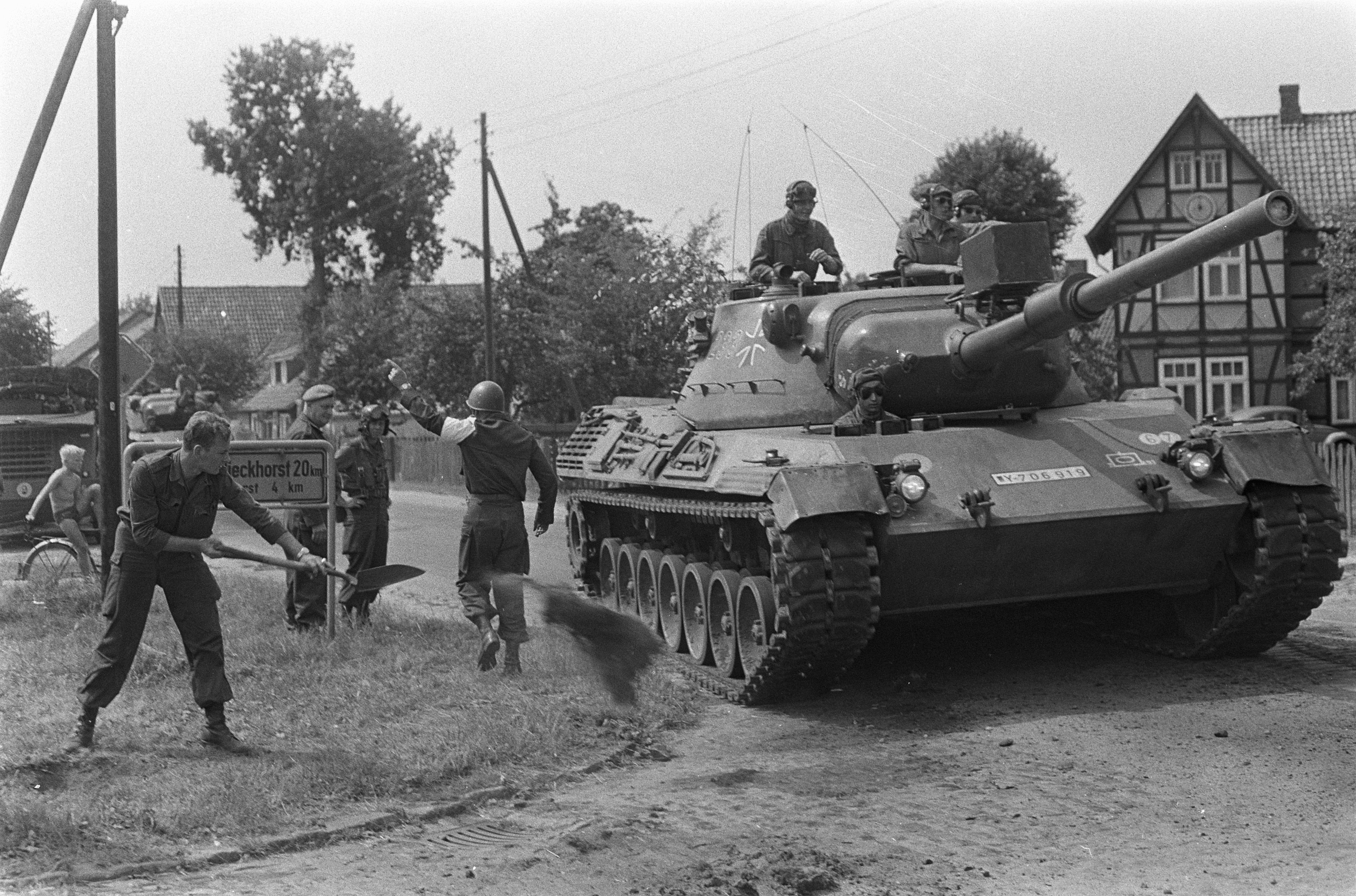
Early West German Leopard 1 in 1968

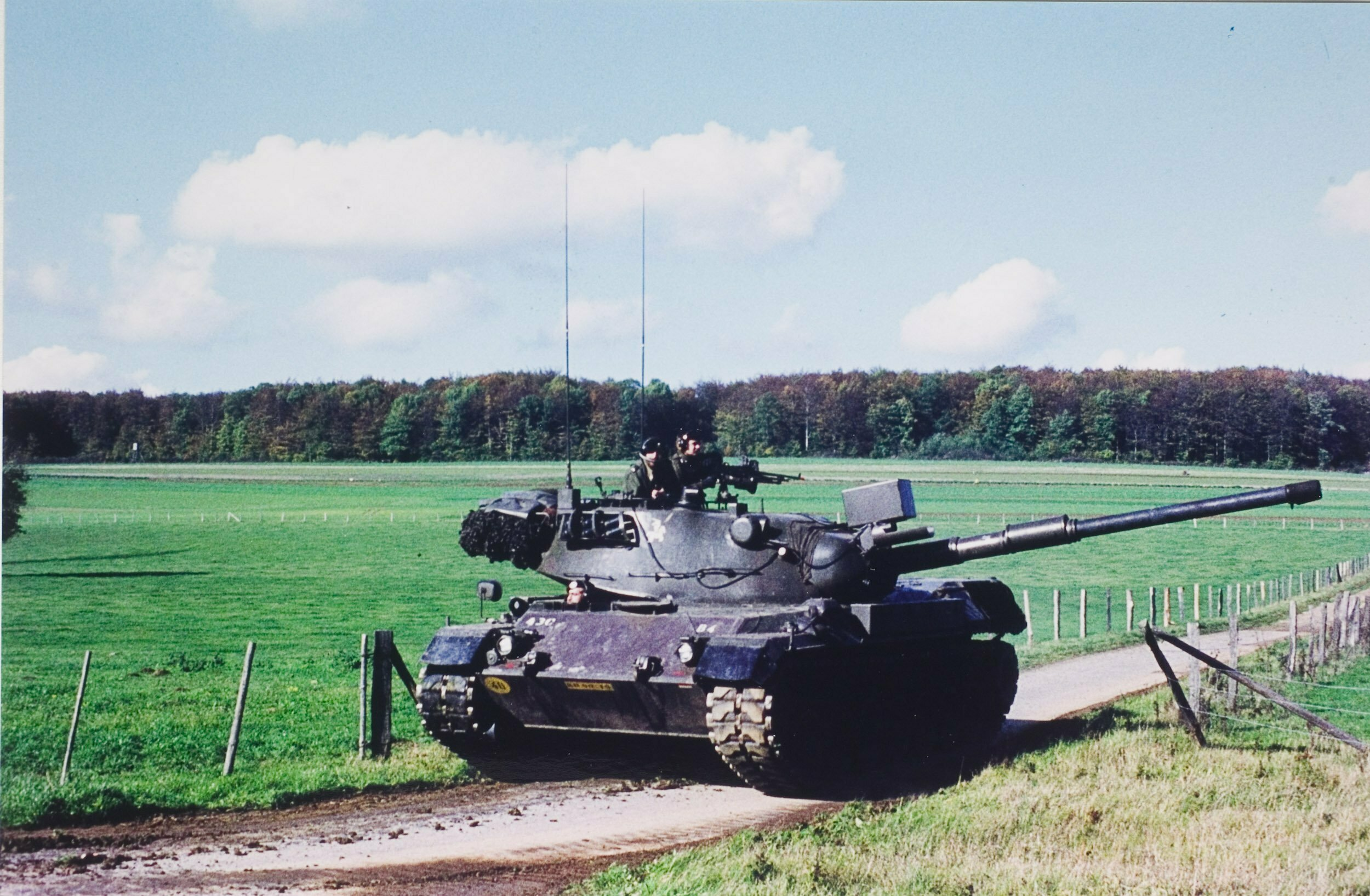
Dutch Leopard 1 tank from the fourth production series; the Netherlands were among the first to accept the vehicle into service in 1969.

France was very interested in the design as its own AMX 50 project had just failed. In June 1957, West Germany and the French Fourth Republic signed an agreement to develop a common tank, designated in German Europa-Panzer. Three German (Arbeitsgruppe A, B and C) and one French design team were included in a competition, with each team producing two prototypes. In September 1958, Italy joined the development program. Several prototypes were entered for testing in 1960. Among the prototypes were Porsche's Model 734 from team A, sporting a cast turret, and that of team B (Rheinmetall), whose cast turret was somewhat higher. Team C from Borgward, designing a very futuristic tank, failed to have a prototype ready in time.

Even before these first prototypes were finished, it had (in 1959) been decided that a second phase with improved designs would be started: Team A had to build 26 phase II prototypes for testing, team B six. Only two tanks of the required six were constructed by team B.

The Porsche Prototype II was eventually selected as the winner of the contest in 1963. This did not come as a surprise: in 1961, it had already been decided to build a pre-series of 50 vehicles based on this design. Production of these was started that very year. This "0-series" was modified with a new cast turret and several hull changes to raise the rear deck to provide more room in the engine compartment and move some of the radiators to the upper sides of the hull. Before mass production of the standard version started, it was decided to add an optical range-finding system for better long-range gunnery, which required the turret to be somewhat taller, and added "bumps" on either side of the turret to mount the optics for triangulation. Germany dropped France from the joint program after France repeatedly missed deadlines for its contribution to the program.

In February 1963, Defence Minister Kai-Uwe von Hassel announced he would soon ask the defence committee in Parliament to approve production of the tank. At this time the tank weighed 40 tons and cost $250,000 each. In July, the Defence Ministry ordered 1,500 tanks with production to take place between 1965 and 1970. Germany also announced its agreement to develop a successor with the United States. Called the MBT-70, the program failed to materialize a tenable design, thus West Germany independently developed the Leopard 2 as its new main battle tank, while the US made the M1 Abrams.

Production was set up at KraussMaffei of Munich from early 1964 onward, with deliveries of the first batch between September 1965 and July 1966. The Leopard was soon being purchased from Germany by a number of NATO members and other allies, including (in chronological order) Belgium (1968), the Netherlands (1969), Norway (1970), Italy (1971), Denmark (1976), Australia (1976), Canada (1978), Turkey (1980) and Greece (1981). Germany has a strict export-policy for their military equipment. Greece, Spain and Chile, while still under dictatorships, purchased the French AMX-30 instead.

== Description ==
The Leopard 1 has a conventional layout shared with numerous other post-World War II tanks, with the driver's compartment located in the front (on the right side, accessed from a hatch in the hull roof which opens to the left) fighting compartment with a rotating turret in the centre (the commander and gunner are seated in the right half of the turret and access their positions from a single-piece hatch in turret roof, on the right side), while the loader takes the left half (and is provided with his own rear-opening hatch) and engine compartment in the rear of the hull, separated from the crew compartment with a fireproof bulkhead.

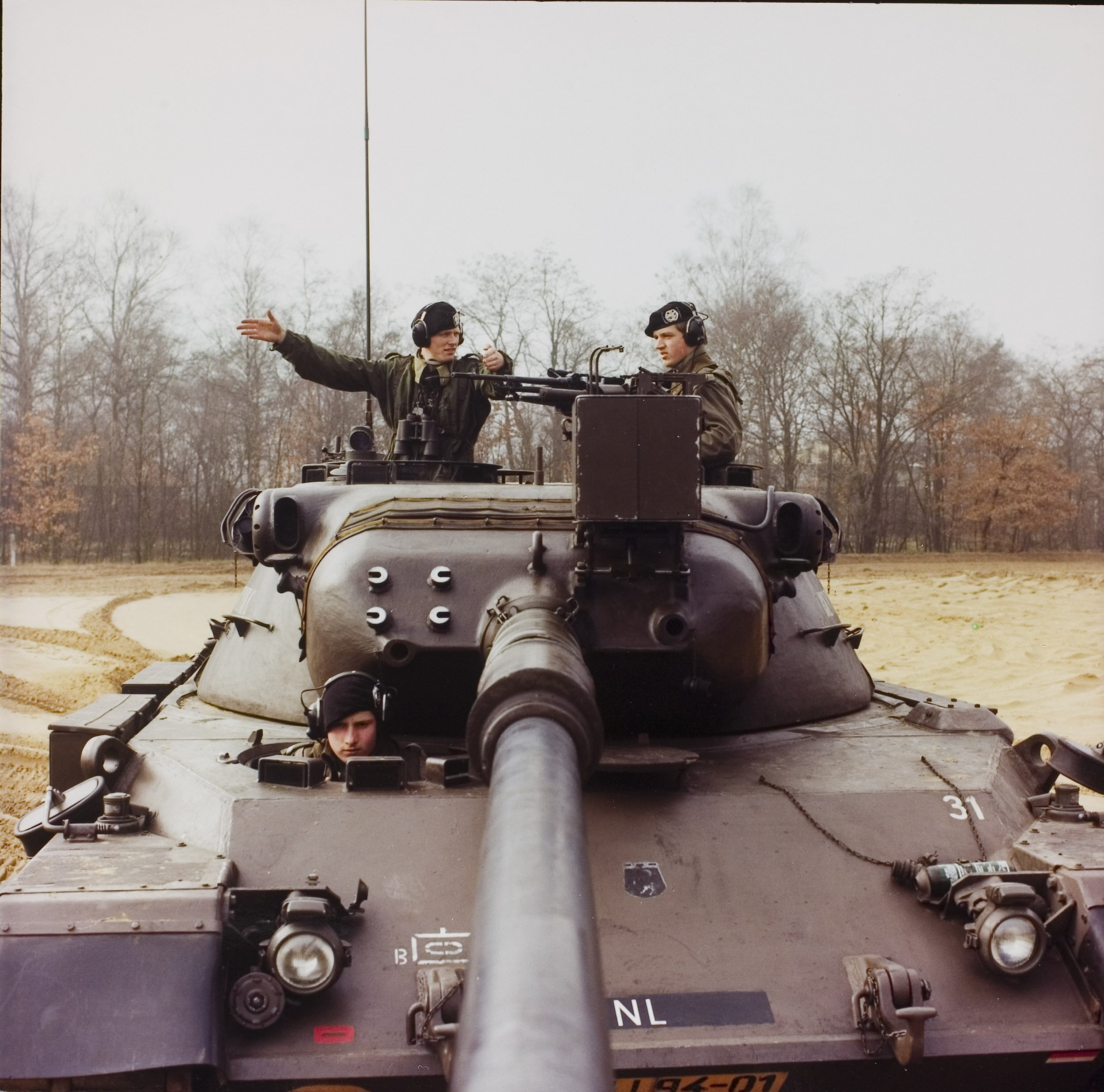
The crew compartment layout, main weapons and sighting/observation systems can be discerned in this photo of a Dutch Leopard 1.

The armament consists of a 105 mm L7A3 rifled main gun (production licensed from the UK Royal Ordnance Factory) which was not stabilized on the first production series, and two MG 1 (later replaced with the MG3) machine guns: one is installed co-axial with the main gun (1,250 rounds are carried for it), while a second, anti-aircraft machine gun, is mounted on a skate rail above the loader's hatch. For defensive purposes, the tank has two banks of four (4) electrically fired smoke grenade launchers on both sides of the turret, which can be fired individually or in a salvo. A reload kit with eight further smoke grenades was carried inside the turret. The main gun uses NATO-standard 105 mm ammunition, with the majority of the loadout (42 rounds) stored in an ammunition magazine inside of the hull, to the left of the driver's station, three rounds are kept in a ready rack in front of the hull magazine—for immediate use—and another 15 rounds are racked inside the turret, for a total of 60 rounds carried onboard.

The gunner takes position in front of and below the commander and is provided with a single, forward-facing observation periscope and the main sights; these consist of a Turmentfernungsmesser (TEM) 1A stereoscopic rangefinder (1,720 mm basis length with a coincidence mode) which has a selectable ×8 or ×16 magnification and is linked with the main gun, as well as a co-axial TZF 1A telescopic sight (×8 magnification) which has a moving graticule for several types of ammunition. The twin, horizontally opposed optical heads for the TEM 1A are located on both sides of the turret in armoured housings and covered by protective flaps operated by the gunner from inside the turret. The commander maintains all-around situational awareness via eight (8) periscopes, one of which can be substituted for an active infrared (IR) night sight. He was provided with an independent, swivel-mounted Turmrundblick-Pankrat (TRP) 1A variable magnification periscope (×6 to ×20 magnification) installed in the turret roof, in front of the commander's cupola, that could be slaved to the main gun and allow the commander to override the gunner and slew the turret. The searchlight for the active IR night vision system was designated XSW-30-U and was mounted above the main gun on the mantlet, offset to the left. It could be removed and stowed in the rear turret bustle when not in use. The searchlight had a range of up to 1,200 m in ideal conditions, in the IR mode (covered by a special IR filter cover), or up to 1,500 m when projecting just white light. In later Leopard variants, a slightly modified, XSW-30-V searchlight was used. Finally, the loader has two (2) periscopes to monitor a designated sector around the vehicle.

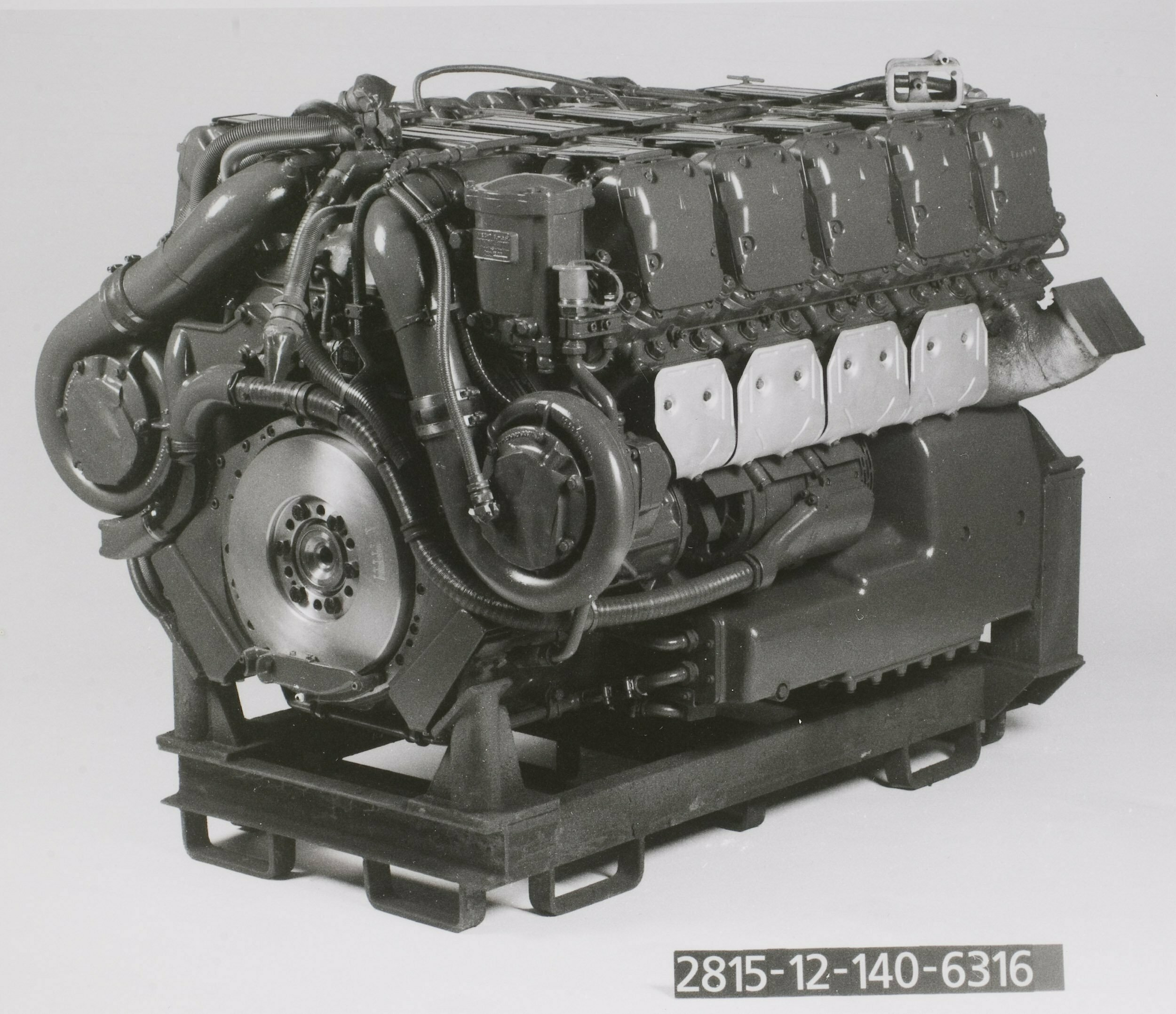
The powerplant is a 10-cylinder MTU MB838 Ca-M500 supercharged diesel engine

The tank is powered by an MTU MB 838 Ca-M500 supercharged diesel engine that develops approx. 610 kilowatts (820 hp) at 2,200 rpms. This is a liquid-cooled, 37.4 litre, ten-cylinder, four-stroke engine in the V-90 configuration with multi-fuel capability but which was typically run on diesel fuel (NATO designation F-54) consuming approx. 190 litres per 100 km. The engine, along with its cooling system is coupled into a "powerpack" with a 4HP-250 transmission system, built by ZF which has a hydraulic torque converter, locking clutch, planetary gearbox and pivot turn mechanism (for each of the gears). The entire powerpack with transmission can be replaced in the field in approx. 20 minutes as it is mated to the hull by means of quick disconnect couplings.

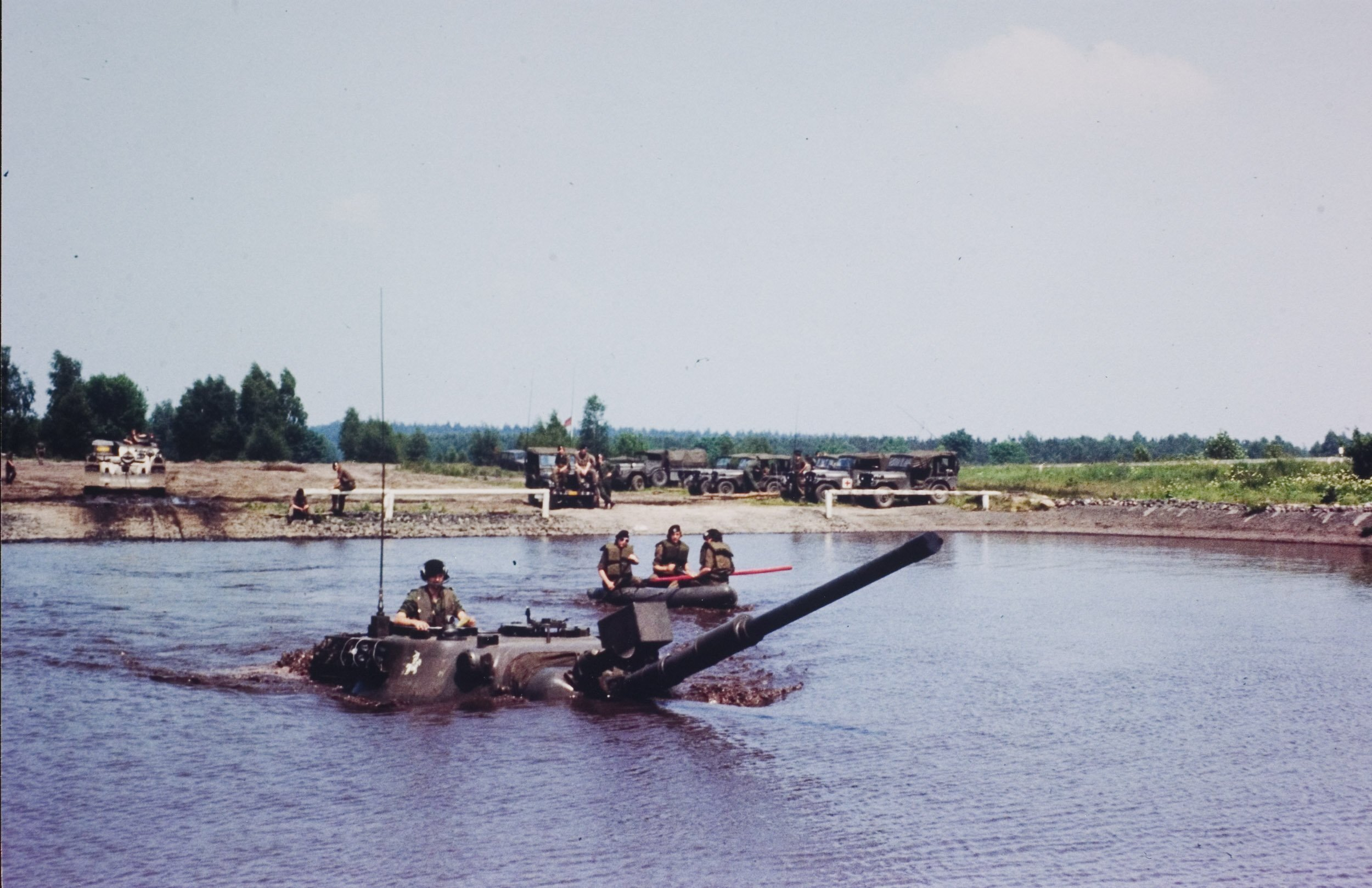
Leopard 1 negotiating a water obstacle

The tank suspension system has 14 independent torsion bars, each with a control arm, and 10 hydraulic shock absorbers, which are installed on the 1st, 2nd, 3rd, 6th and 7th pairs of road wheels. The running gear has seven (7) pairs of dual road wheels with rubber-tyres, a rear-mounted drive sprocket, frontal idler wheel and four return rollers on either side.

The Leopard's hull is fabricated from welded armoured plate of varying thickness and geometry, while the turret is a complex all-cast component. Crew protection was enhanced with an automatic (manual trigger also available) fire suppression system and an NBC protection system, which produces an overpressure in the crew compartment and provides filtration of supplied air. The Leopard 1 can ford water obstacles (up to 1.20 m deep) by wading without any prior preparation; deeper obstacles (up to 2.25 m depth) can be negotiated by sealing the tank and fitting a foldable snorkel over the commander's cupola; two bilge pumps are provided to remove any water accumulated.

== Variants ==
=== Leopard 1A1 ===
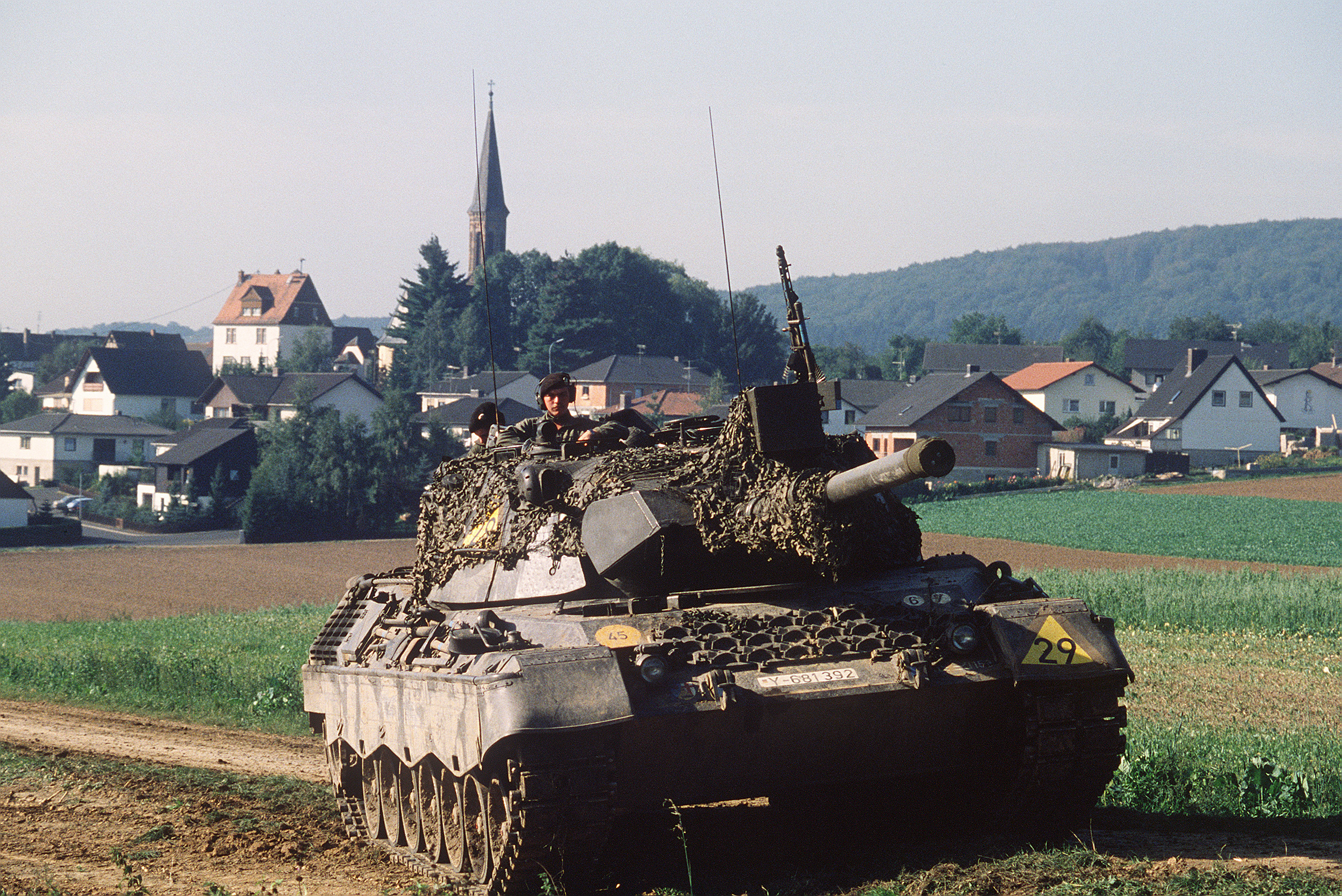
A West German army Leopard 1A1A1 with additional spaced armour on the turret and gun mantlet.

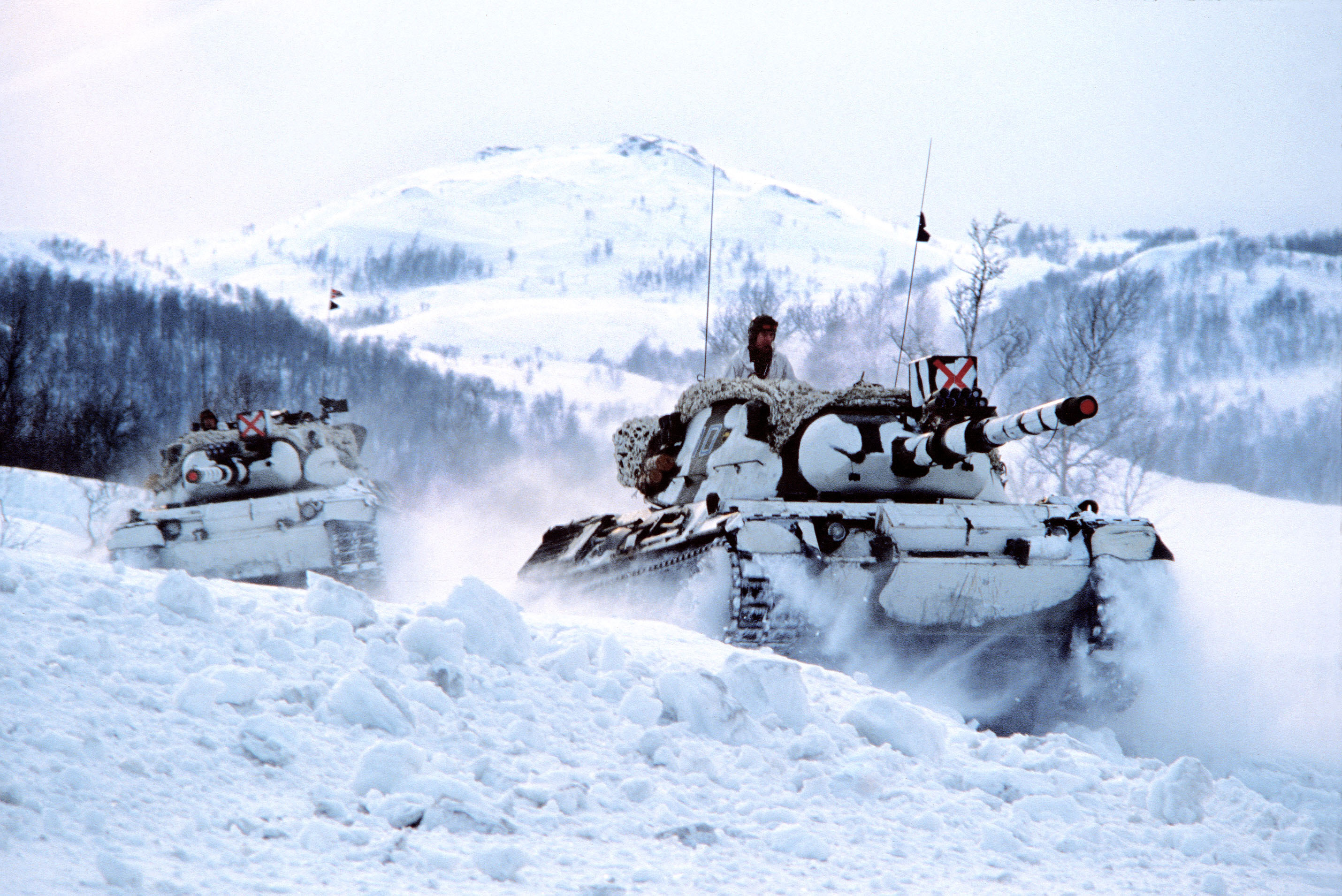
A Norwegian Army Leopard 1A1

After the last vehicle from the first four production series was delivered, the Bundeswehr initiated an upgrade programme in 1970 to increase the combat effectiveness of its tanks. Known as the Leopard A1 (later Leopard 1A1, after the introduction of the Leopard 2), these tanks received a new gun stabilization system from Cadillac Gage (full stabilization in both elevation and traverse, as well as powered elevation from -9° to +20°) that allowed the tank to fire effectively on the move. The 1A1 added metal-rubber skirts along the hull flanks to protect against HEAT warheads, and the gun barrel was wrapped in a jacket to reduce deviation from thermal loads. The track was changed to a D640A double-pin type with detachable, rectangular rubber pads instead of the earlier double-pin Diehl D139E2 track with vulcanised treads. The rubber pads of the new tracks could be easily replaced with metal X-shaped grousers for movement on ice and snow. 20 grousers were provided for each tank and stored on brackets on the front hull upper glacis when not in use. A new snorkel was developed that allowed for underwater driving to a depth of 4 m after sealing the tank with special plugs. The driver's and commander's active infrared night vision periscopes were replaced with passive image intensification night sights.

Between 1975 and 1977, all tanks in the first four batches were brought to the Leopard 1A1A1 standard, and given additional turret armour developed by Blohm & Voss, which consisted of rubber-lined steel plates bolted to the turret (including the rear turret basket) with shock-resistant spacers. The gun mantlet received a wedge-shaped armoured cover made from welded steel plates and the engine's air intake system was improved. Thus upgraded vehicles weighed 42.4 t (93,000 lb).

An upgrade in the 1980s added a hybrid LLLTV/passive IR aiming and observation system, which were being handed down from the Leopard 2 as they were themselves upgraded to thermal imagers. The PZB 200 low light level television (LLLTV) system with IRS 100 infrared scanner was developed by AEG-Telefunken and mounted in a protective cage on the mantlet, above the main gun, creating the Leopard 1A1A2. The system combined an LLTV camera which was a type of image intensification device producing a TV picture on the commander's and gunner's monitors, coupled with an IR scanner (sensitive to thermal differences in the 3-5 μm wavelengths and based on a PbSe detector) which would superimpose the processed IR image over the LLLTV signal to improve target detection and identification.

In the late 1980s, all-digital SEM 80/90 VHF radios were issued to the Bundeswehr and installed in various models of the Leopard 1; the Leopard 1A1A1 with these new radios received the Leopard 1A1A3 designator, and those vehicles with the LLLTV/IR system and SEM 80/90 radios would be known as the Leopard 1A1A4.

=== Leopard 1A2 ===
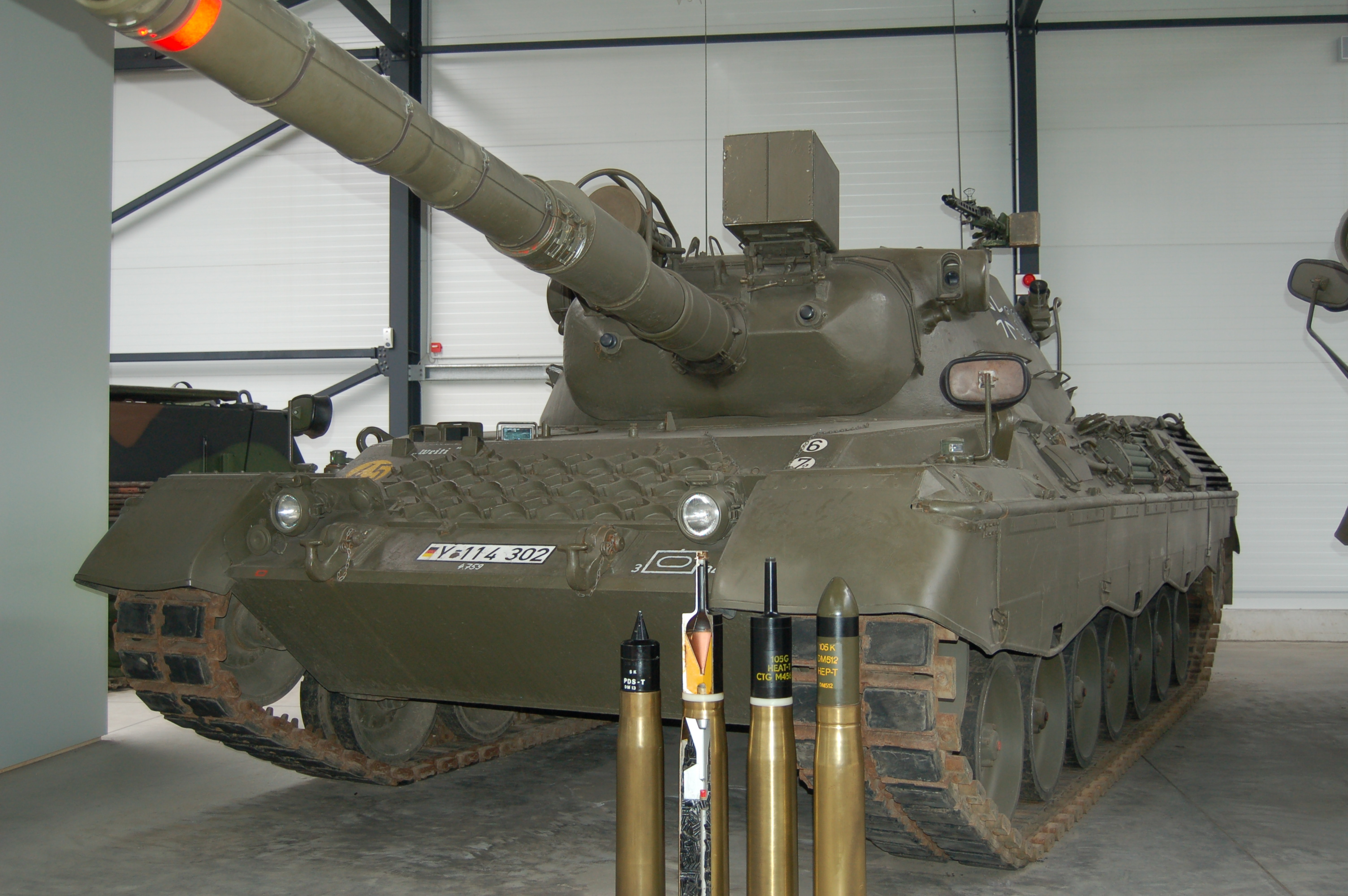
Cast turret Leopard 1A2A1 with upgraded LLLTV/IR night sights mounted inside of a protective cage to the right of the IR searchlight on the gun mantlet.

The first 232 tanks of the fifth production batch were delivered as the Leopard 1A2 between 1972 and 1974. The A2 included a heavier and better armoured cast turret which was visually difficult to distinguish from the previous type. The most notable difference were the oval, as opposed to round, armoured housings for the optics of the TEM rangefinding sight. The Leopard 1A2 tanks were not subject to further armour upgrades as was the 1A1, but did receive improvements to their NBC protection system.

Throughout their service, these tanks would receive several other upgrades: the Leopard 1A2A1 received AEG-Telefunken LLLTV/IR sights, the Leopard 1A2A2 received digital radios, and the Leopard 1A2A3 got both.

=== Leopard 1A3 ===
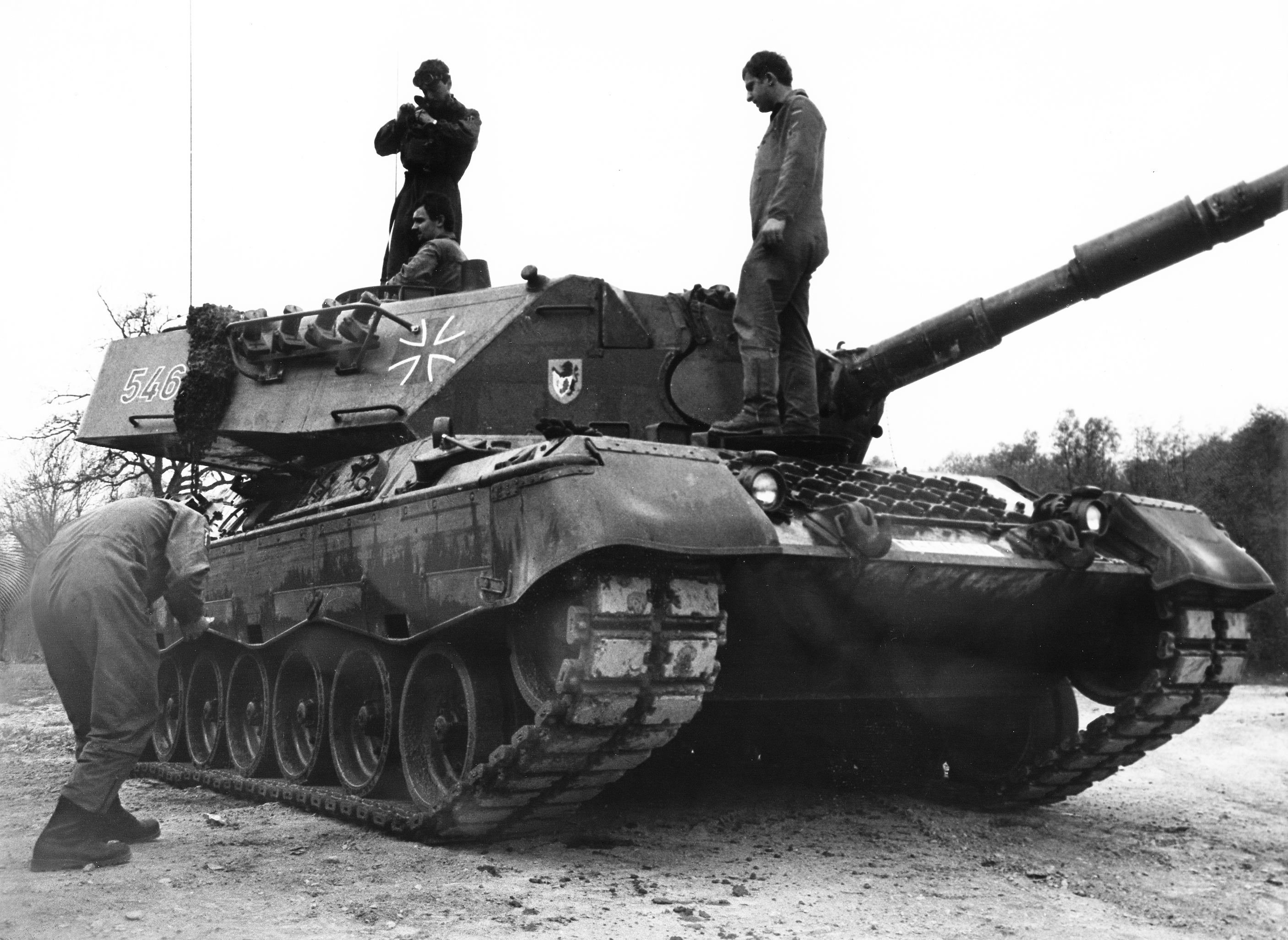
The Leopard 1A3 received a new, welded turret which can be distinguished by its angular shape. Seen here is a vehicle of PzGrenBtl 301 in 1984.

The next 110 vehicles in the fifth production batch were fitted with a new type of welded turret designed by Blohm & Voss, which was equipped with spaced armour, and a wedge-shaped gun mantlet, resulting in the Leopard 1A3. Although the level of armour protection was equivalent to the cast turrets of the prior A2, the internal volume was increased by 1.5 m^{3} and the effective protection level was increased. The commander was given an improved TRP 2A independent observation periscope and both of the loader's fixed periscopes were replaced with a single unit with tilt and traverse adjustment. Most of the vehicles of this batch were allocated to the 10th and 12th Panzer Divisions. Henceforth, all newly manufactured Leopard 1 tanks from Krauss-Maffei and MaK would use this welded turret, as casting large parts such as tank turrets was overly complex and the welded design carried greater upgrade potential.

Subsequent upgrades were parallel to the 1A2 models: the Leopard 1A3A1 with improved night sights, Leopard 1A3A2 with the new radios, and the Leopard 1A3A3 with both.

=== Leopard 1A4 ===
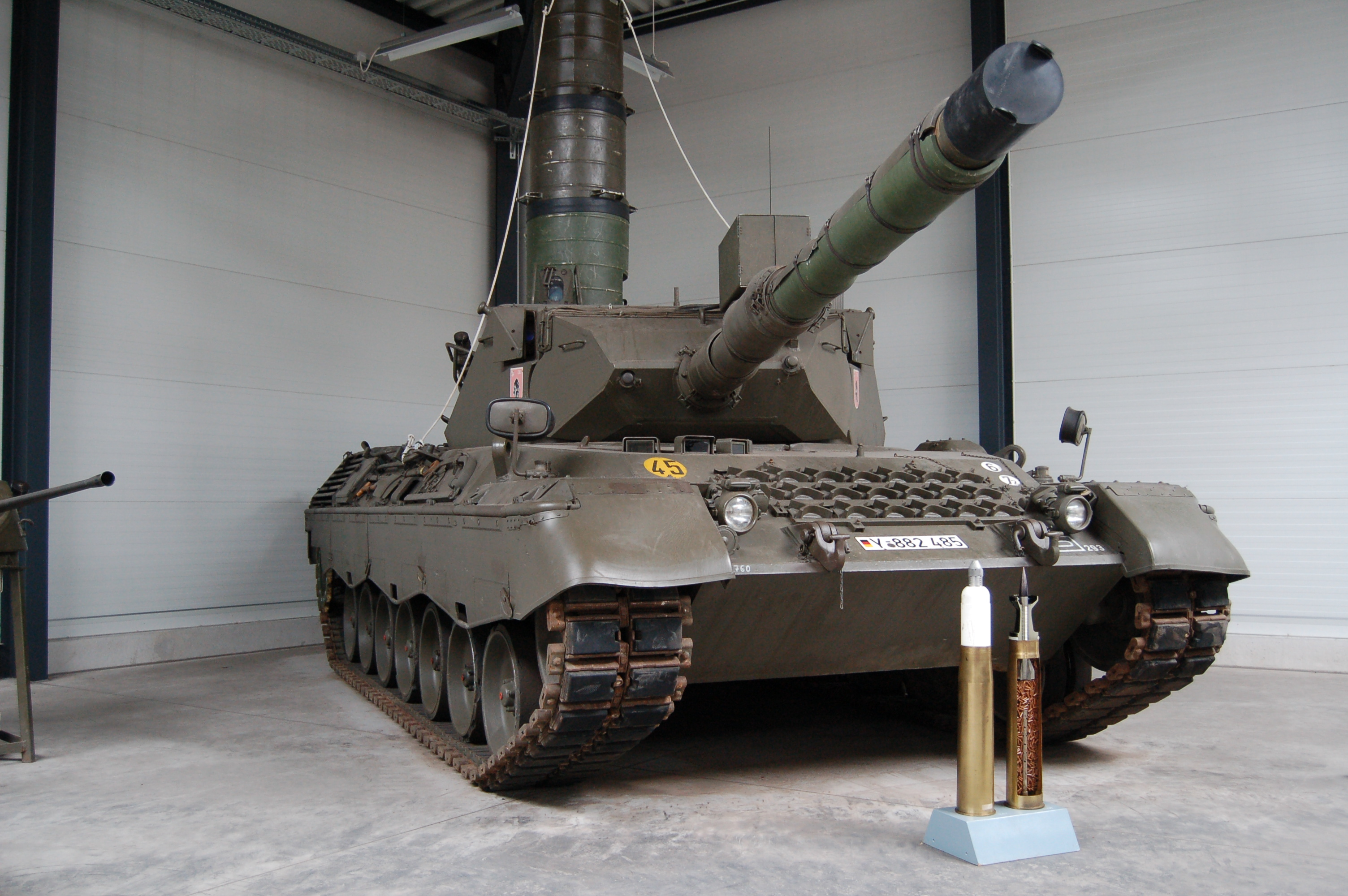
Leopard 1A4 at the German Panzer Museum Munster. The vehicle is displayed with a deep fording snorkel, which would be used to draw in combustion air for the operation of the engine while submerged in water.

The Leopard 1A4 formed the sixth batch of 250 vehicles (215 manufactured by Krauss-Maffei and 35 from MaK), starting delivery in 1974. The 1A4 was externally similar to the 1A3, but included a new, integrated fire control system. This consisted of a stabilized PERI R12 independent sight for the commander, a new EMES 12A1 stereoscopic rangefinder coupled to the gunner's primary sight, a fully stabilized main gun and FLER HG ballistic computer. Many of these systems were derived from the Leopard 2 program. While the EMES 12A1 was still just an optical rangefinder (the desired laser rangefinder was still in development), it was used for target acquisition and linked to the ballistic computer, which would automatically produce a lead angle once the range was measured and several other ballistic inputs were computed. This solution reduced the time between target acquisition and engagement and increased the first-round-hit probability. The PERI R12 sight improved the commander's efficiency, allowing him to acquire and relay targets to the gunner considerably faster in what can be considered the precursor to "hunter-killer" capability. The PERI R12 sight also had an integrated night channel (2nd generation image intensifier) toggled with a switch; a considerable improvement over the prior TRP sights which had no night vision capabilities and had to be un-installed and exchanged for an infrared device. The PERI R12 was mounted in the turret roof forward of the commander's cupola and was protected by wire guards. The gunner's forward-looking observation periscope was deleted.

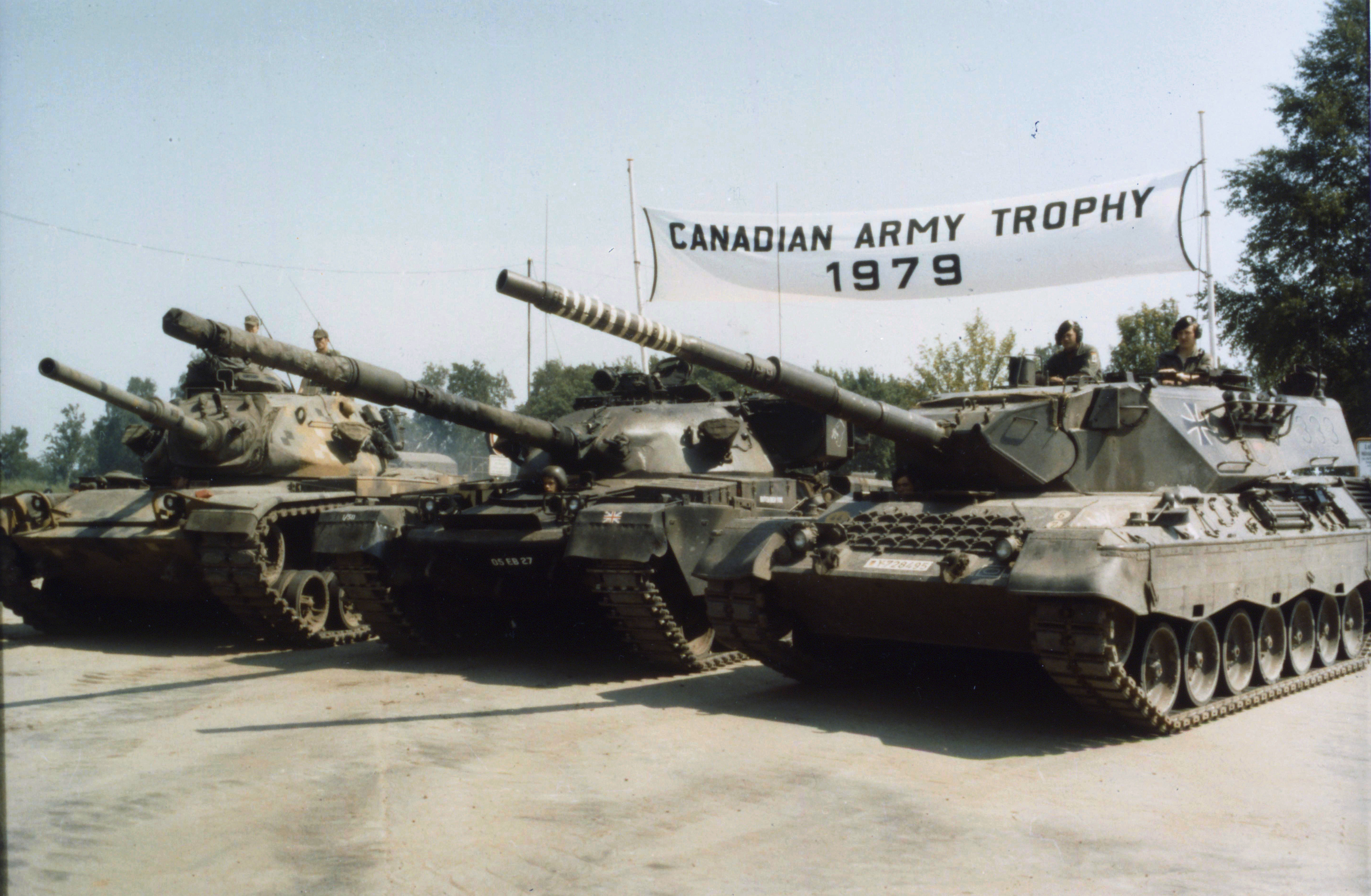
West German Leopard 1A4 (far right) at the Canadian Army Trophy gunnery competition in 1979.

The new equipment for the fire control system consumed additional space and the ammunition load was reduced to 55 rounds, of which 42 were stored in the hull-mounted magazine, while the remaining 13 rounds were in ready racks in the turret. The hull received only minor modifications involving the layout of the tow cables and storage rails for the winter grousers.

Final deliveries of the Leopard 1A4 for the Bundeswehr took place in 1976 and would mark the conclusion of Leopard 1 production for West Germany.

=== Leopard 1A5 ===
In 1980, a research program was undertaken to investigate further improvements to the Leopard 1, stipulating the need for a new fire control system/ballistic computer and thermal camera for effective night and all-weather capabilities to effectively fight against the more sophisticated Soviet T-64B, T-72B and T-80B series of tanks. A crucial part of the upgrade was the introduction of more effective ammunition, including new APFSDS rounds (DM33) offering to about 419 millimeters of penetration at a 100 meter distance with a velocity of 1500 meters per second. The decision was made to base the upgrade on earlier models which were no longer competitive. The resulting Leopard 1A5 was a retrofit of 1,225 Leopard 1A1A1 vehicles from Bundeswehr stocks.

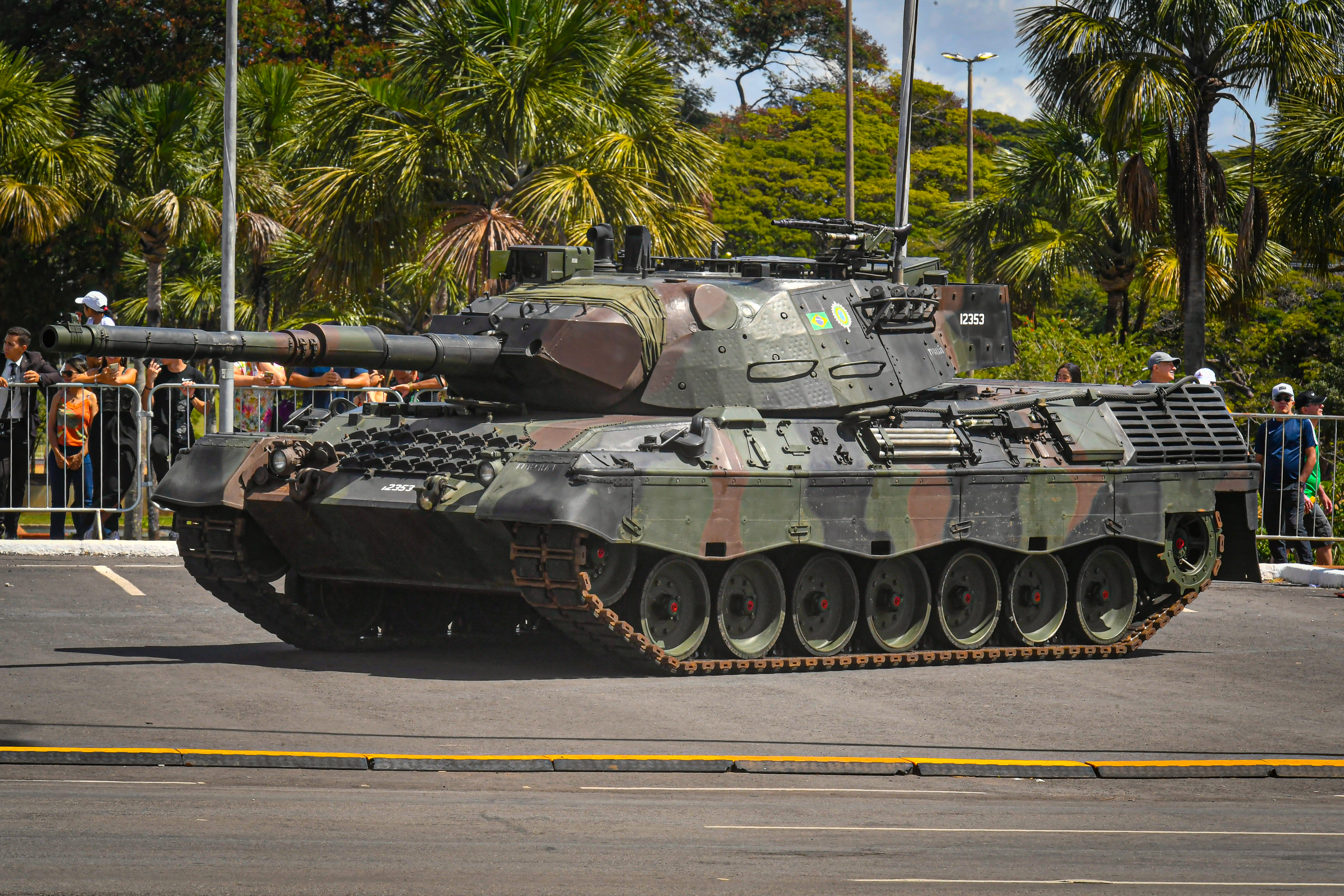
The Brazilian Army Leopard 1A5 BR tank

After trials, the Krupp-Atlas Elektronik EMES 18 fire control system, which was developed from the EMES 15 used on the Leopard 2, was selected in December 1983. The large, box-like armoured enclosure for the EMES 18 primary sight was mounted on top of the turret, in front of the commander's hatch, and contained a fully stabilized (both in azimuth and elevation) head mirror which was used for the daylight vision channel (×12 magnification and 5° field of view), Nd:YAG laser rangefinder and a WBG-X thermal imager from Carl Zeiss. The gunner would access both day and night channels from the primary sight via binocular eyepiece, in addition to his back-up telescopic daytime sight (the TZF 1A from previous models). The commander would receive imagery from the gunner's primary sight on his ocular by way of a light pipe. His station retained the panoramic periscope (improved model TRP 5A) and vision blocks, with the TRP sight and forward facing vision block raised to clear the EMES 18 sight housing. Both commander and gunner could control the turret traverse with hand controllers, but an override function was given to the commander. In a typical engagement scenario, the commander would identify the target and slew the turret to its azimuth, then hand the target over to the gunner. Using the primary sight, the gunner would aim at the target and lase it to obtain a range; tracking would be initiated (if the target was moving). The fire control computer would then take the manual (ammunition type, target speed – obtained from the horizontal turret traverse rate) and automatic inputs (vehicle cant correction from a vertical sensor, atmospheric conditions, powder temperature, altitude) and continuously compute superelevation and lead solutions for the main armament. Control signals were transmitted to the turret and main gun drives to align the plotted aiming mark with the main gun bore axis, without disturbing the line of sight. Once these were coincident, the gunner could fire. The fire control computer contained ballistic information for up to 7 different ammunition types. Upgraded tanks initially made use of the existing Cadillac-Gage stabilization system, but since 1988, all Leopard 1A5s were either built or retrofitted with a new SRK servo-hydraulic turret and gun control system. The bulbous, horizontally opposed objective housings for the optical rangefinder were removed and their openings in the turret—sealed with armour plates. Two new types of high performance kinetic energy APFSDS rounds were introduced for use in the Leopard 1A5: the DM23 (a variant of the Israeli M111 Hetz-6) and DM33 (Israeli M413 Hetz-7) rounds. One test vehicle was armed with the smoothbore 120 mm main gun and all A5s are adapted to carry this weapon, but the concept did not proceed into production.

The running gear on these vehicles was improved with strengthened torsion bars and shock absorber mounts. Lifting hooks were welded to the hulls of early production vehicles which lacked them (first and second batches) and the driver's station received high pressure washers for his observation periscopes (later installed in most Leopard 1s in German service). A three-tone camouflage was also applied to all tanks undergoing the conversion to A5 standard.

The first modified vehicle was delivered in December 1986 and the conversion process ran until 2001 and 2002, which coincided with a reduction of armored forces in the Bundeswehr, resulting in fewer Leopard 1A5 tanks delivered than were originally authorized. Most of the Leopard 1A5 tanks delivered to the Bundeswehr were assigned to formations of the former East German army. Leopard 1A5s which received new SEM 80/90 VHF radios in the late 1980s were designated Leopard 1A5A1.

Since then, almost all users of the Leopard 1 have applied similar changes to their own vehicles, and in most ways the 1A5 can be considered the "standard" Leopard 1 today.

=== Leopard 1A5BE with Cockerill 3105 turret ===
On 18 May 2025, Belgium announced a military aid package for Ukraine which included a prototype Leopard 1A5BE for testing. It has a new turret which is unmanned having been fitted with an autoloader carrying 12-16 rounds.

=== Leopard 1A6 ===
The Leopard 1A6 prototype was a single Leopard 1 A1A1 testbed, modified with additional armour on the turret and equipped with a 120 mm L/44 gun. The project was ended in 1987, as the Leopard 2 was in widespread service at this point and the 1A5 offered a more reasonable upgrade path for a fraction of the cost.

=== Modified and derivative vehicles ===
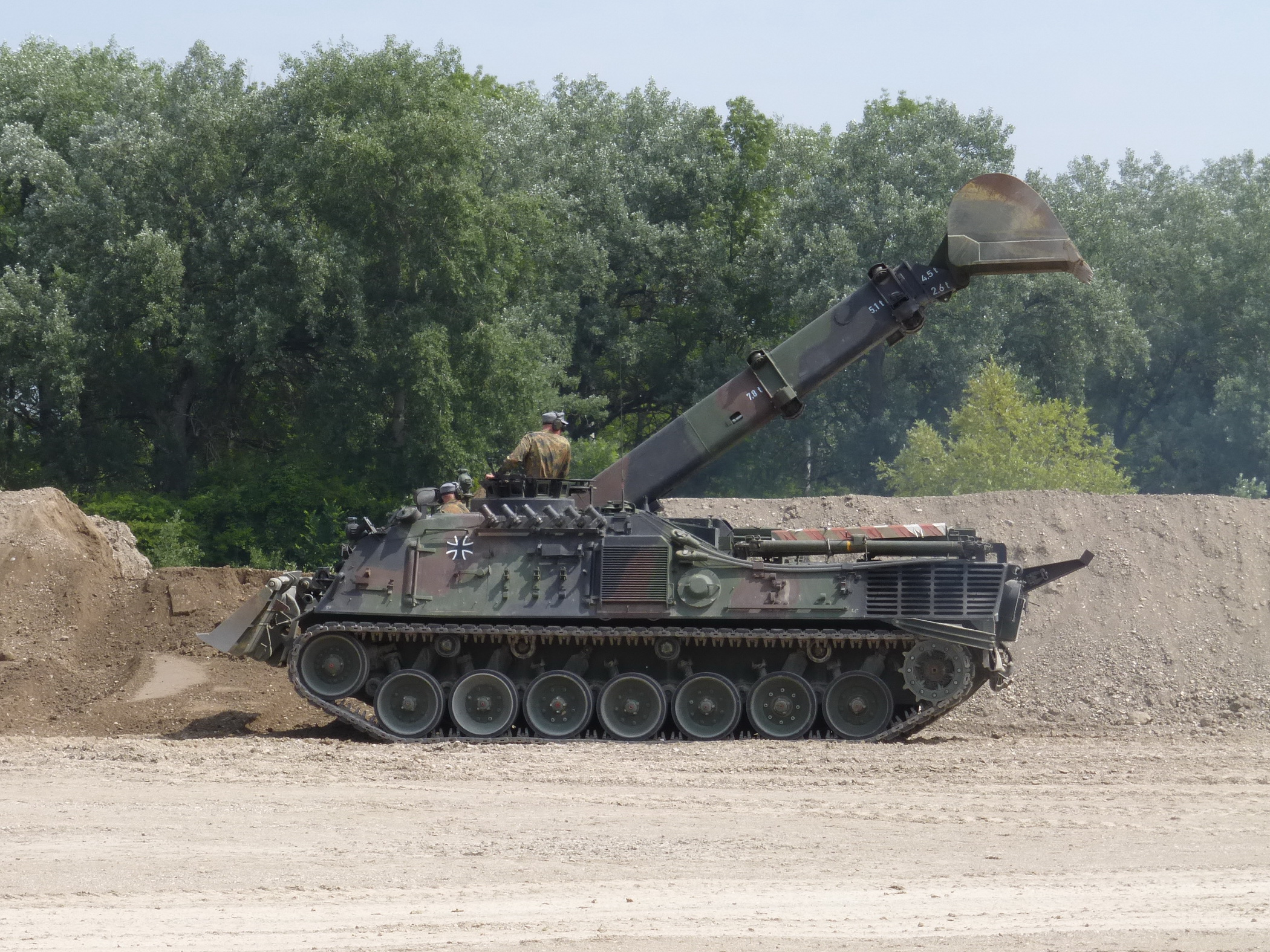
An armoured engineering vehicle "Dachs" (Badger) German Army

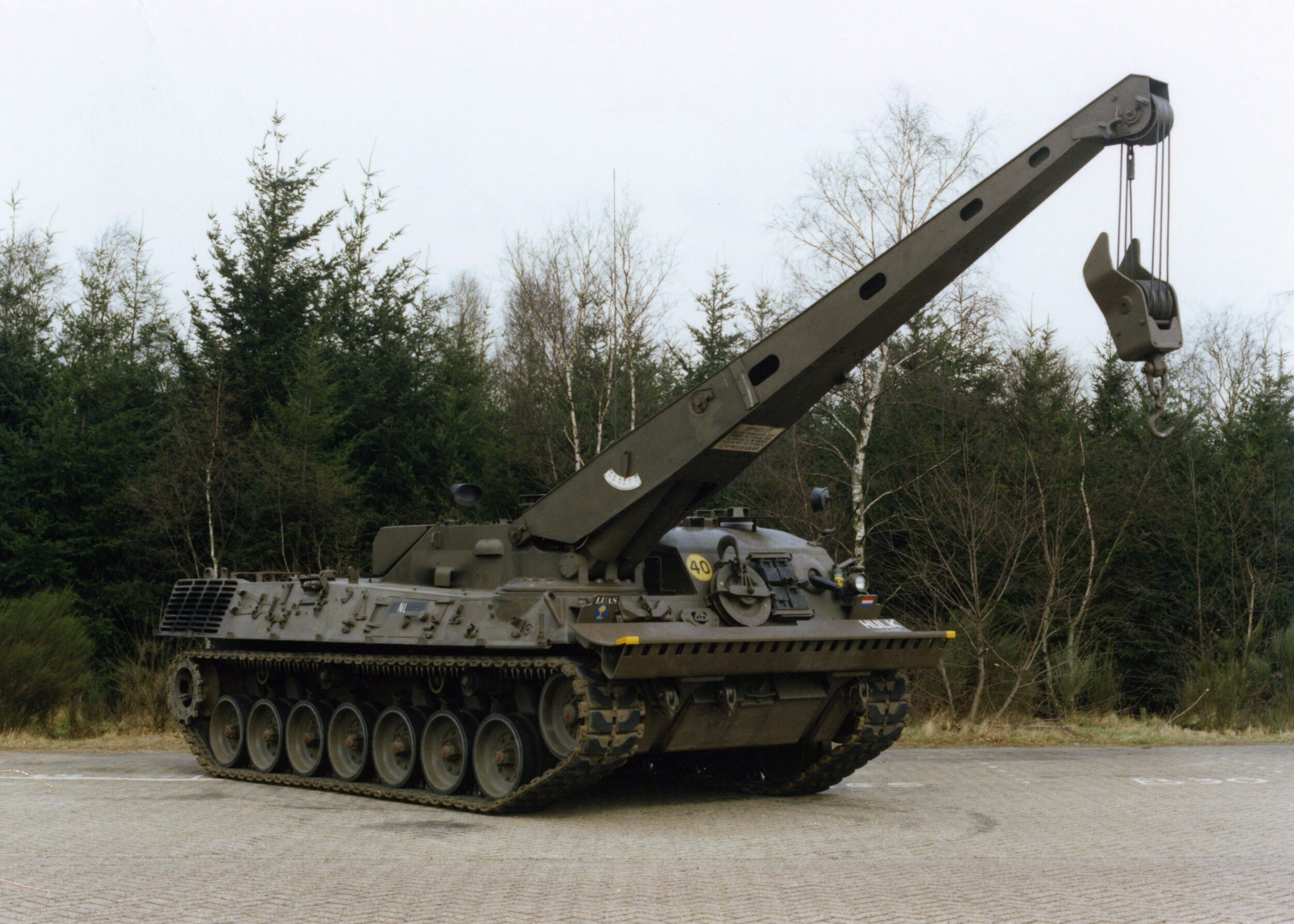
Bergepanzer 2 of the Royal Netherlands Army with erected crane

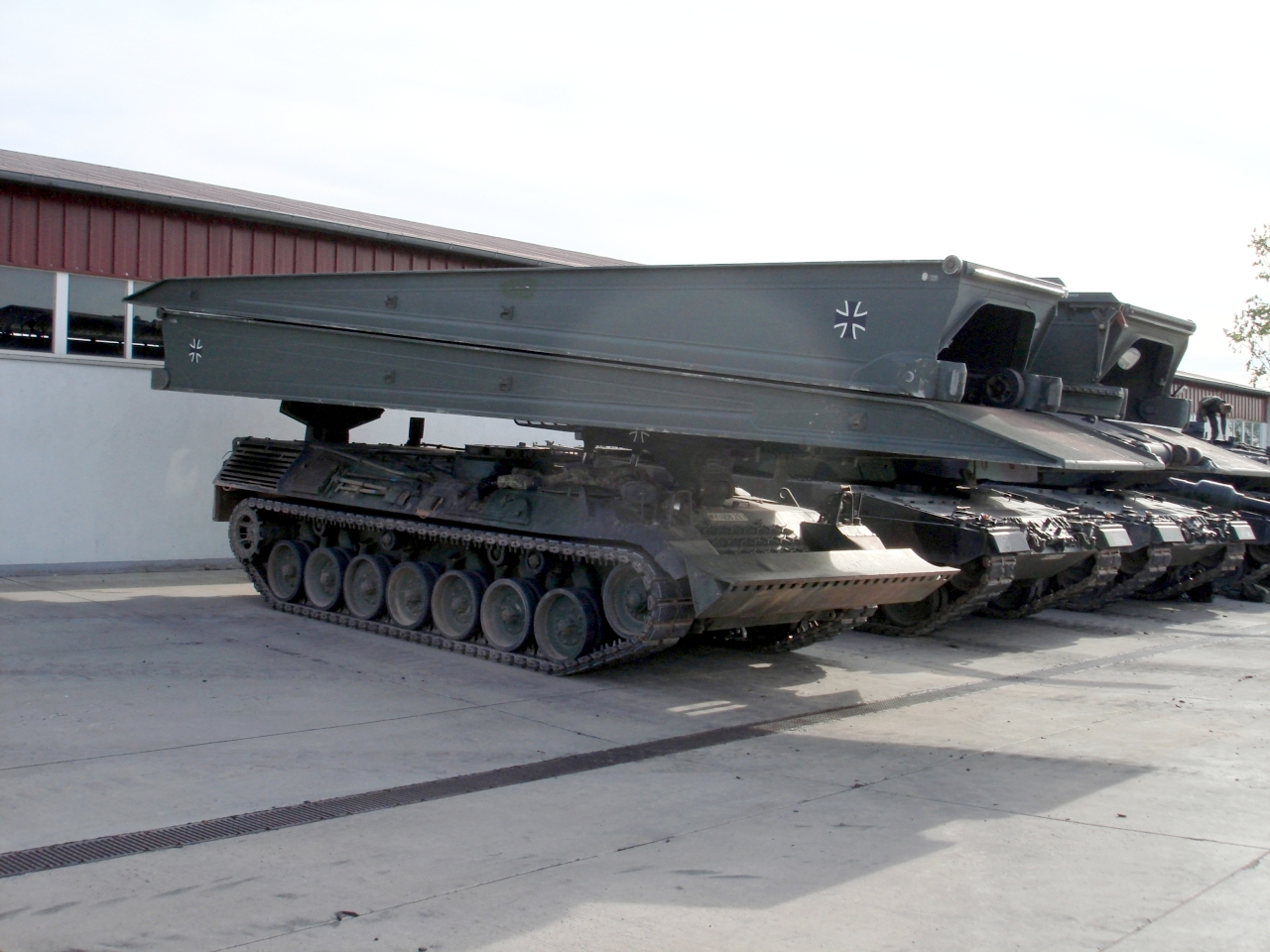
A bridgelayer "Biber" (Beaver) with armoured vehicle-launched bridge

Simultaneous to the production of the battle tanks, a number of engineering, bridging and recovery vehicles were developed, as well as a number of versions used in the anti-aircraft role.

The most well known Leopard variants are the Bridgelayer "Biber" (Beaver), "Bergepanzer 2" armoured recovery vehicle, "Pionierpanzer 2 Dachs" (Badger) armoured engineer vehicle and the "Gepard" self-propelled anti-aircraft gun. The Warsaw Pact equivalent of the Gepard is the ZSU-23-4. Marconi Electronic Systems once offered conversions to the Marksman SPAAG for existing users of the Leopard 1. The Leopard 1 chassis would be used to carry the Marksman turret.

The Canadian Army operates the Beaver Armoured vehicle-launched bridge, Taurus ARV, and Badger AEV, all based on the Leopard 1.

The United Kingdom's Royal Marines operate a vehicle known as the Hippo beach armoured recovery vehicle. The Hippo is a conversion of a Leopard 1A5 chassis by Alvis Moelv. The main alteration has been the replacement of the turret with a raised superstructure that resembles the wheelhouse of a boat. The original 830 hp (634 kW) diesel engine has been retained, but the gearing of the transmission had been lowered, reducing the vehicle's road speed to 32 km/h (20 mph), but increasing tractive effort to 250 kN (56,000 lbf). Other modifications include the addition of working platforms, a nosing block, raised air intakes and an Auxiliary power unit. This raised the weight of the vehicle from 42.5 tonnes to 50 tonnes. The Hippo has a fording depth of 2.95 m (10 ft) and can pull vehicles up to 50 tonnes weight or push off from the beach a 240 tonne displacement landing craft.

German company Flensburger Fahrzeugbau is the producer of a vehicle known as Wisent 1, a modernization of the Bergepanzer 2, it comes in Armoured Recovery Vehicle, Armoured Engineer Vehicle and Mine Clearing vehicle versions. The Wisent 1 is known to be operated by Denmark and Ukraine.

=== Gilded Leopard, Eber and Keiler ===
Almost as soon as the Leopard was introduced into service in 1965, Porsche was awarded a contract to study further improvements to the existing design, while awaiting deliveries of the MBT-70 in the mid-1970s. This original Gilded Leopard (vergoldeter Leopard) program expired in 1967 with no production order. In 1967, it had already become obvious that the MBT-70 would be a failure. The agreement between the US and the Federal Republic of Germany forbade any national development of an MBT apart from technological experimentation, so a new tank project was begun under the designation of Experimentalentwicklung or "experimental development", two prototypes of which were built.

When the MBT-70 program was ended, a further contract was offered under the name Boar (Eber), with an emphasis on using as many technologies from the MBT-70 as possible, but without the problematic XM150 152 mm (6.0 in) combined gun/MGM-51 Shillelagh missile launcher. Two prototype vehicles were constructed using a new chassis from Porsche with the road wheels from the MBT-70 and the original Leopard engine. This was combined with a new Wegmann turret, mounting the MBT-70's Rheinmetall 120 mm smoothbore gun. Some also mounted the original 105 mm L7.

These were considered promising enough that seven more were ordered, this time powered by the MTU engine designed for the MBT-70. When this happened, the Experimentalentwicklung team went public with their alternative design which they called the Keiler (a synonym of Eber). In 1971, the minister of defence, Helmut Schmidt, decided to abandon the Eber-project and build 17 prototypes of a Leopard 2, based on the Keiler design, which had a turret with spaced sloped armour. The maximum weight was to be 50 tonnes.

During the 1973 Yom Kippur War, 1950s and 1960s generation tanks were badly beaten by wire-guided missiles, and it was realized that dramatically improved armour protection was needed. The decision was made to allow the tank to increase its weight to the next classification, Military Loading Class 60 (tonnes). A new design effort was started, with the spaced armour replaced with a much denser perforated armour assemblage. The new design would go on to augment and, after the Cold War, sometimes replace the Leopard in many countries' armies.

=== Jumbo Track Multi Fire Fighting and Rescue Vehicle ===
One ex-German Leopard 1 has been converted into a firefighting and rescue vehicle, called the Jumbo Track Multi Fire Fighting and Rescue Vehicle, by Ram Europe. The conversion, commissioned by Ram Europe CEO Theodore Rentzos, involved the addition of a new metal superstructure over the hull. This superstructure contains a water tank capable of carrying 15,000 liters of water, as well as an air-conditioned compartment capable of carrying up to 10 passengers.

== Operational history ==
=== Australia ===
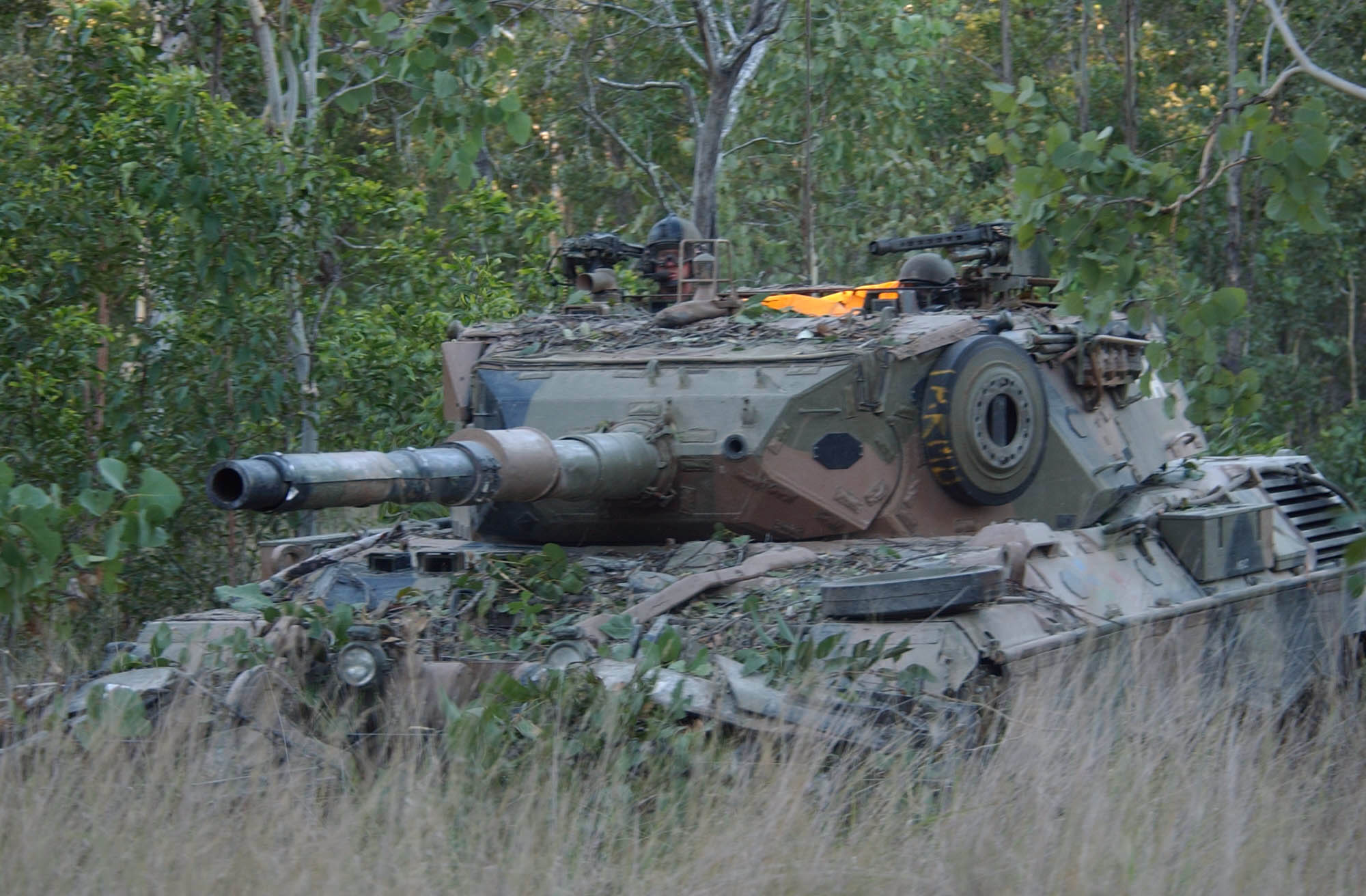
Australian Army Leopard AS1 on exercise, 2005

In 1974, the Australian government confirmed the purchase of the Leopard, with a total of 101 vehicles being acquired, consisting of 90 MBTs, five Bridgelayers and six ARVs. Two more ARVs were purchased later. The first Leopards arrived in Australia from West Germany in 1976, ending a selection and trial process against the US M60 series that started in 1971, when the army decided it needed a replacement for its British Centurions, which had served since 1952 and had been deployed during the Vietnam War.

In March 2004, the decision was made to replace the Leopard 1 with reconditioned US M1A1 Abrams AIM. The first 18 of 59 M1A1 Abrams arrived in September 2006. The M88A2 Hercules is concurrently replacing the Leopard family of support variants in Australian service. The Leopard 1 was operated by the 1st Armoured Regiment and was officially withdrawn from service in July 2007. Their guns were never fired in combat operations. Some of the retired tanks were offered to military museums or RSL clubs.

=== Belgium ===
The Belgian Army received 334 Leopard 1BE between 1968 and 1971. They equipped eight tank regiments, each equipped with 40 Leopards, and the Armour School. The first regiment to receive the Leopard was the 4th Lancers, followed by the 1st Lancers, 2nd Lancers, 3rd Lancers, 8th Lancers, 1st Guides, 2nd Guides and finally the 2nd Mounted Rifles. From 1974, they were modified with a gun stabilization system and an Automatic firing direction system (Automatisch VuurLeidingsSysteem, AVLS) from SABCA. This system allowed the gun to fire on the move.

In 1984, the Army Command decided to upgrade 132 Leopard to the A5 standard as Leopard 1A5(BE). At the end of the Cold War, there was a drastic cut in the number of tanks and 128 were sold to Brazil. The upgrade started in 1993 and was completed in 1997. The upgrade included a new gun firing direction system with thermal imaging, a laser rangefinder and a muzzle reference system. At that time, four regiments were still equipped with the Leopard 1A5(BE). At the end of the 1990s, the remaining four regiments amalgamated into two tank regiments, the 1st/3rd Lancers and the 2nd/4th Lancers. In 2010, the 2nd/4th Lancers was disbanded.

Around 40 Leopard 1A5(BE) were kept operational in the 1st/3rd Lancers and Carabiniers Prins Boudewijn – Grenadiers. The 1st/3rd Lancers is no longer a tank regiment, but a medium infantry battalion, identical to the rest of the medium infantry battalions of the Belgian Army except for having a single squadron of Leopard 1A5(BE). Belgian Leopards have served in Kosovo. In 2014, following the government's decision to replace all Land Component tracked vehicles (Leopards, AIFV, and M113) with PIRANHA DF90s, Belgian Leopards were retired from service with most tanks being put on display, used for target practice, or sold inoperable to a Belgian company.

During Eurosatory 2022, John Cockerill offered the Cockerill Medium Tank 3105 upgrade package for Leopard 1 tanks. The prototype for the upgrade integrated the hull of the Leopard 1A5(BE) with a Cockerill 3105 turret. The only modification to the hull is the installation of an adaptor ring for the new turret and an electronic cable. The turret is armed with a 105 mm Cockerill 105HP with a 12-round autoloader and a 7.62 mm coaxial machine gun, with both thermal and day sights. The installation of the new turret reduces the tank's weight by 5 tonnes and the tank crew to 3 personnel. The prototype was converted at the John Cockerill facility in Aubange and underwent firing tests at the Suippes military base in March 2022.

The Belgian Army also had the following variants:

- 36 armoured recovery vehicles (ARV – TRV)
- 17 Pioneer tanks (armoured engineers)
- 55 Gepard anti-aircraft tanks (withdrawn from service)
- 12 driving school tanks
- 9 Leguan AVLB (armoured vehicle-launched bridge)

Belgium sold its last 50 Leopard 1A5BE tanks to OIP Land Systems in 2014 for roughly €37,000 each. In January 2023, the government sought to buy these back to give to Ukraine; however, the purchase was delayed over a disagreement on price, with OIP wanting around €500,000 each to cover the cost to refurbish them to battle-ready condition. All 50 were subsequently purchased by Rheinmetall, with 30 to be refurbished and 20 used for spare parts.

=== Canada ===
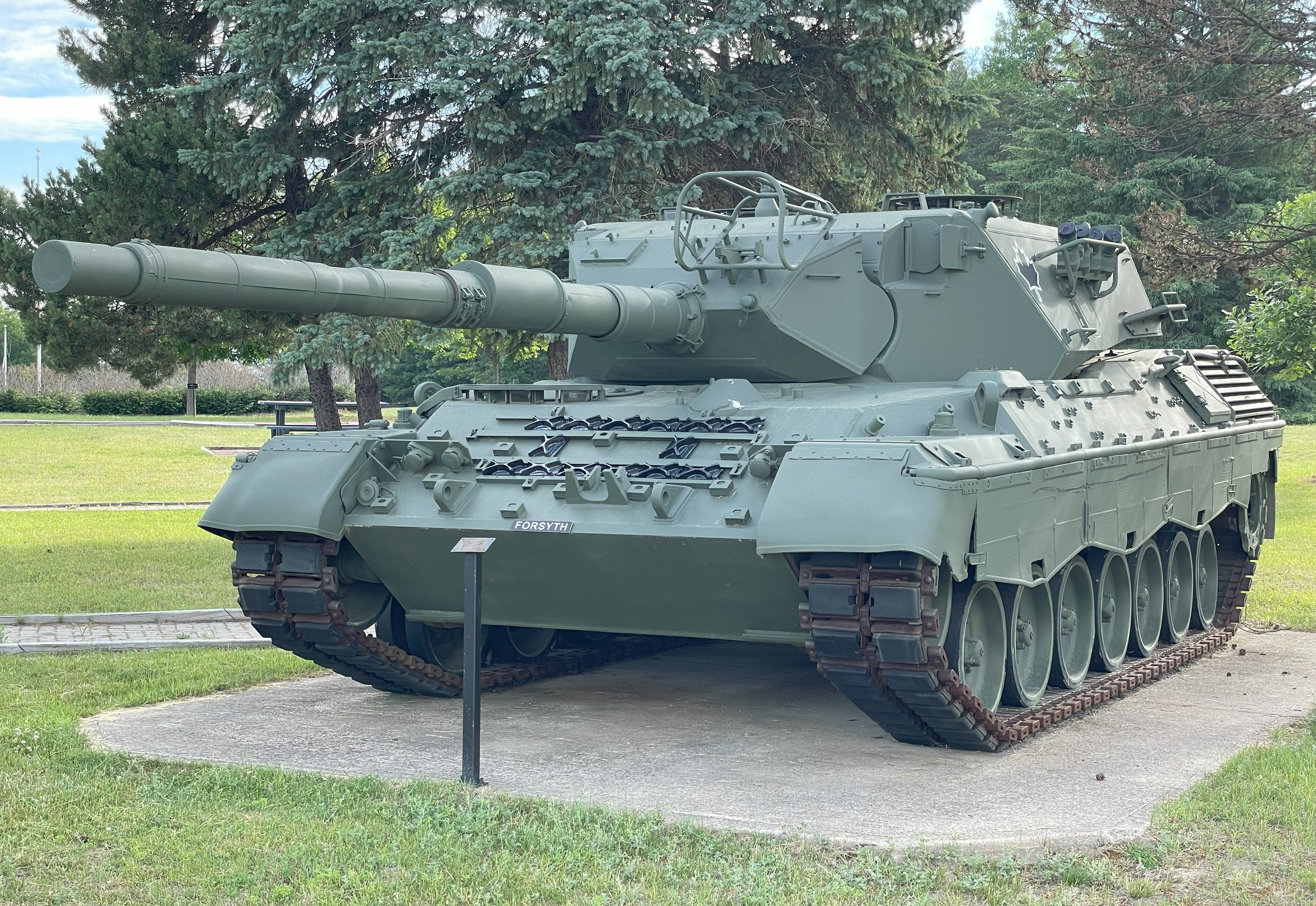
A Canadian Leopard C1 tank displayed at CFB Petawawa

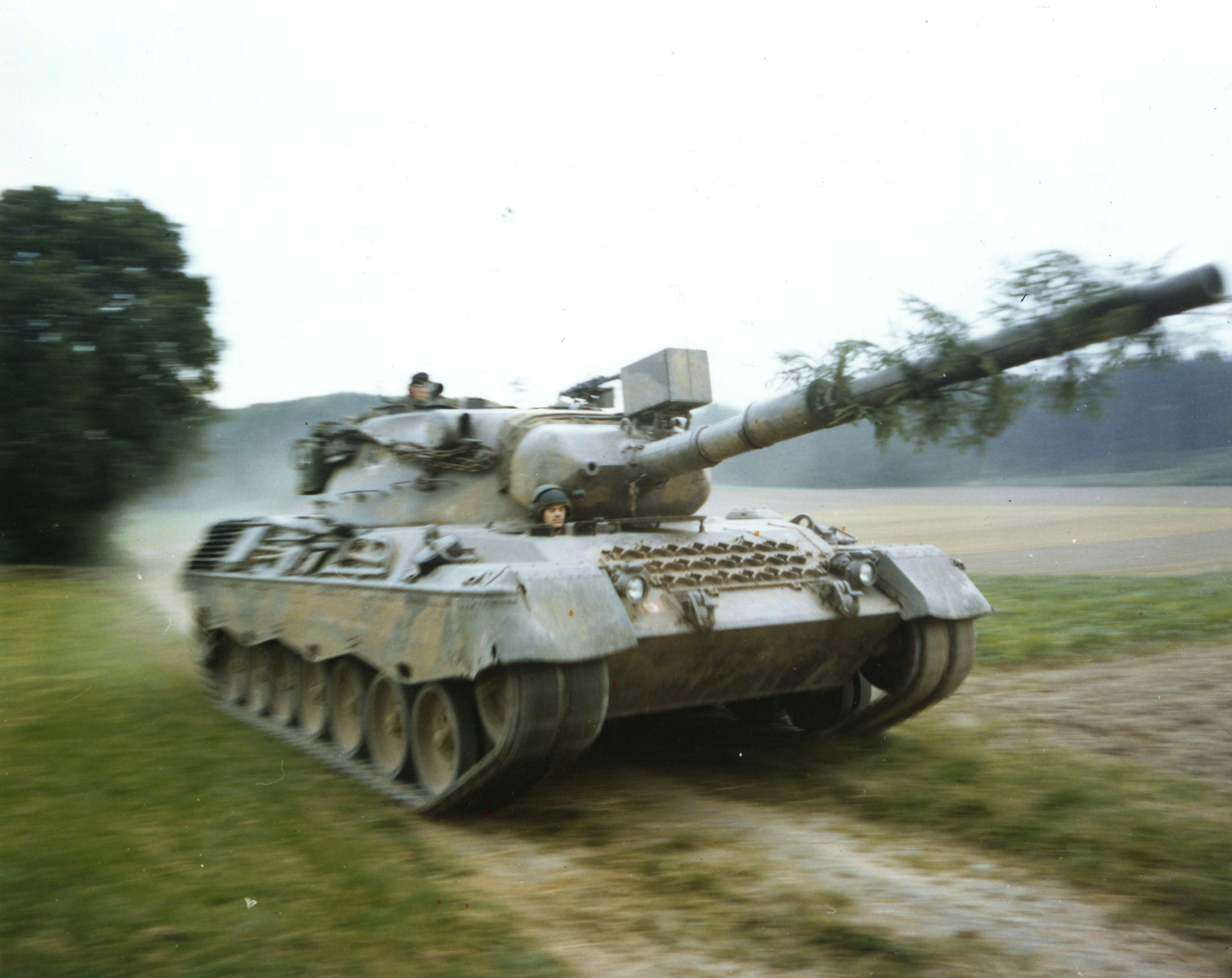
A Leopard 1A2 operated by Canadian Armed Forces participating in exercise REFORGER 1977.

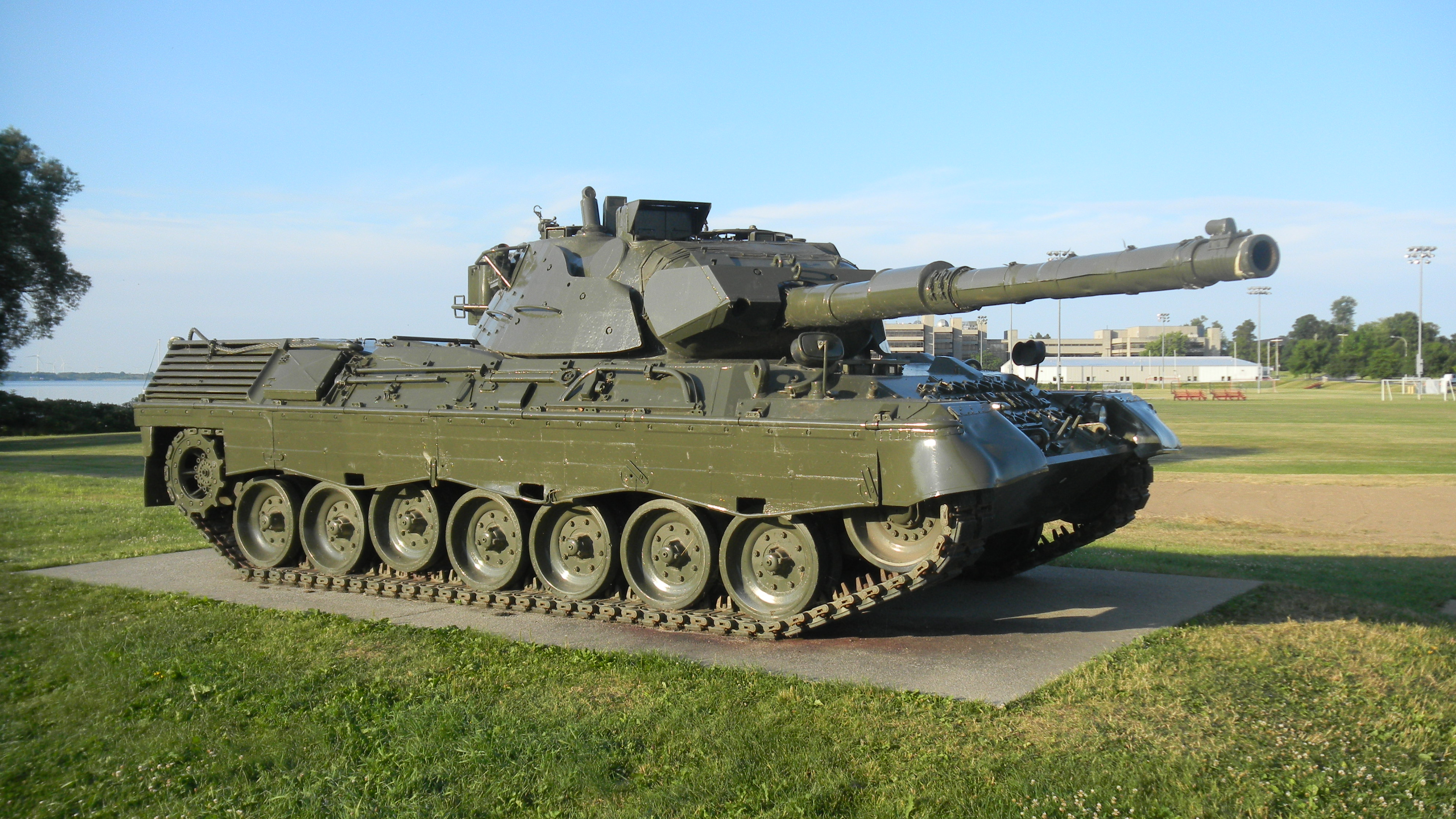
A Canadian Leopard C2 on display at the Royal Military College of Canada in Kingston

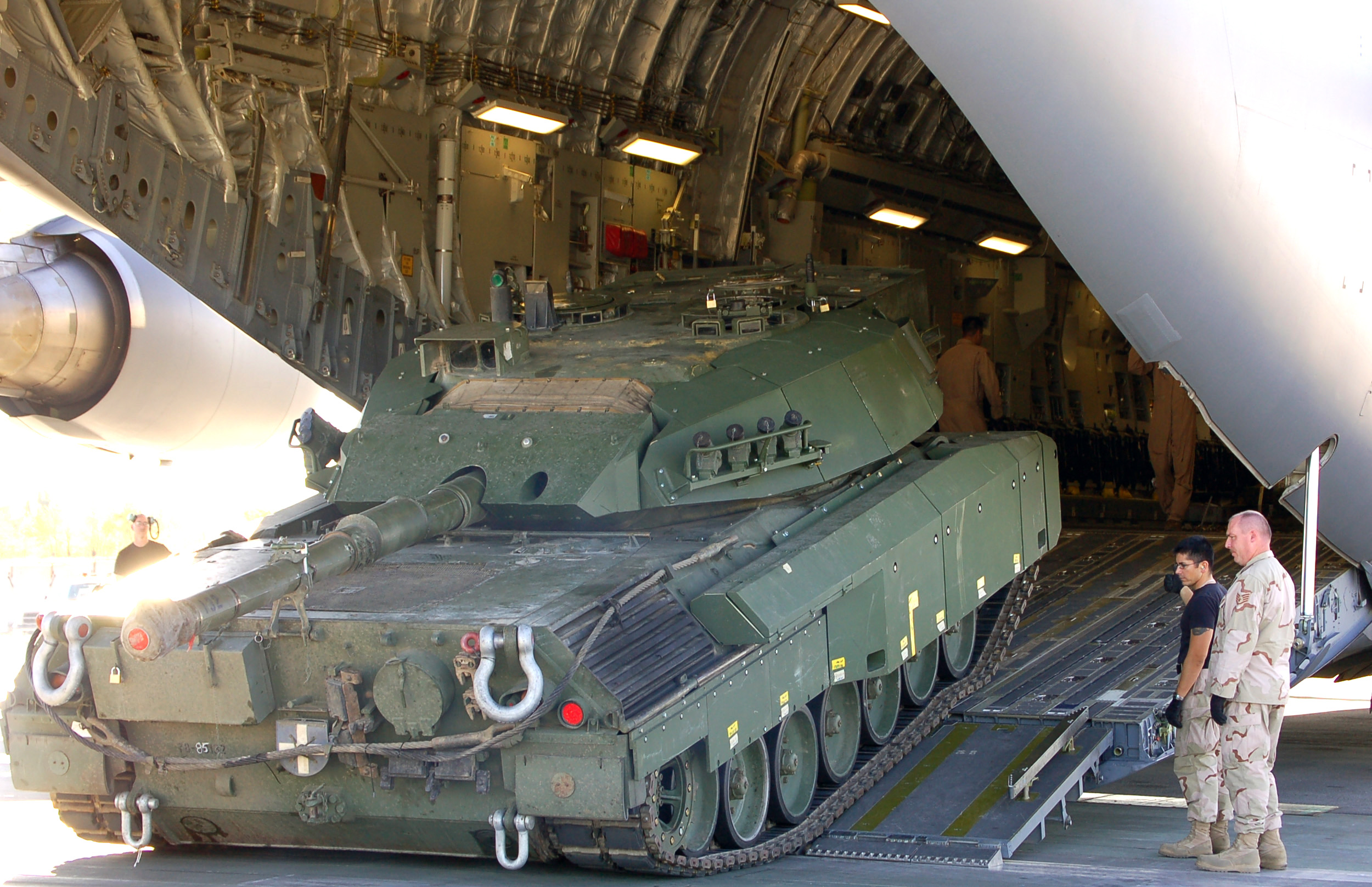
A Canadian Leopard C2 MEXAS, en route to Afghanistan, October 2006

As a replacement for the Centurion, Canada acquired 114 Leopard C1 tanks (equivalent to Leopard 1A3 with laser rangefinder) in 1978 and 1979 for its Land Forces. Most of these tanks were stationed in West Germany during the Cold War, with a few retained at Canadian Forces Base Gagetown, New Brunswick for training. In 1976, prior to delivery of these new Leopards, the Canadian government leased 35 Leopard 1A2 tanks from the contractor in order to begin training crews from the 4 Canadian Mechanized Brigade Group (4CMBG) based in West Germany. These tanks equipped the Royal Canadian Dragoons (RCD) that competed against other NATO tank crews and won the Canadian Army Tank competition in 1977.

While investigating the possibilities of increasing the Leopards' armour prior to a refit, the turret armour on close-up inspection was 1.5-inch + turret wall cast 0.75-inch steel, the 'belly' armour was approx. 2.25-inch + cast frame steel 0.75-inch steel, skirt covering treads (tracks) was 1-inch rubber – not steel. Additional armour was applied on the forward half of the skirt during the refit as well as increased 0.6-inch steel on the upper hull sides and 1.1-inch steel on the upper Glacis – although only a small handful of C1s received a complete refit.

The refit included adding thermal night-vision equipment. Five or six Leopard C1 tanks had an extremely thick MEXAS appliqué armour kit applied, made by the German firm IBD Deisenroth Engineering. These tanks, designated Leopard C1 MEXAS, served with Lord Strathcona's Horse (Royal Canadians) in the 1999 KFOR mission in Kosovo. They were later upgraded with the same sights and fire-control system as the Leopard C2 (see below).

Starting in 1996, the 114 Leopard C1 tanks in service were due to be upgraded to the Leopard 1A5 standard, designated as the Leopard C2, at a cost of CA$139 million. The turrets of 123 surplus Leopard 1A5 tanks purchased from the German Defence Ministry were fitted into the existing hulls (nine turrets were reserved for spare parts and training), and the German tank hulls sold back to the upgrade contractor. For the process, the original Leopard 1A3 turrets had their main armament removed first, then were removed from the original C1 hulls. The modified Leopard 1A5 turrets were then fitted onto the C1 hulls. The removed L7A3 105 mm guns were refitted onto the new turrets. Due to the complexity of the upgrade process, of the 114 tanks, 66 tanks were successfully upgraded. The first updated Leopards, now named the Leopard C2, entered service in November 1999, at CFB Gagetown, New Brunswick.

The Leopard C2's turret was modified according to the Canadian Army's request, with new radios being installed, and new stowage containers being fitted to the rear of the turret. Aside from the requested add-ons, the biggest update for the Canadian Leopard tank fleet was the implementation of the Atlas-Elektronik EMES-18 Fire Control System module, which featured a similar computerized setup as the C1's SABCA FCS, a laser rangefinder, and thermal imager. Eighteen Leopard Crew Gunnery Trainers were purchased at the same time.

Canada also operates the Leopard 1-based Beaver AVLB and Taurus ARV, bought with the original Leopard C1, and the Badger AEV with a dozer blade and excavator bucket, which entered service in 1990.

A number of the Canadian Leopard tanks were pulled out of service during the mid-2000s in anticipation of replacing them with the eight-wheeled Mobile Gun System. These plans were put on hold after US experience revealed serious shortcomings related to stability and weight. Of the obsolescent tanks, 23 were sold to companies in North America, four put in museums or used as monuments, including two at the Bovington Tank Museum, and 21 used as hard targets on ranges.

Canada sent a squadron of Lord Strathcona's Horse to Afghanistan in late 2006, equipped with 17 Leopard C2 tanks with the MEXAS add-on armour, as well as four recovery vehicles and four engineering vehicles. The armoured squadron was intended to provide convoy protection, supporting Canada's Provincial Reconstruction Teams and other organizations equipped with lighter vehicles, and combat operations. The first tanks arrived in Kandahar in mid-October 2006. On 2 December 2006, the Leopards stationed in Kandahar entered the field, marking the first time since the Korean War that a Canadian armoured squadron had sent tanks into an active war zone. They fired their guns in combat for the first time in as many years the following day, in response to a Taliban rocket attack.

The deployed tank squadron was in combat operations from late 2006 until July 2011. The first squadron deployed with C2 MEXAS. In mid July 2007, a thermal cover and a cooling unit with crew vests was added to the tanks. The tank squadron was augmented in mid September 2007 with the 20 Leopard 2A6Ms with slat bar type armour. The Barracuda camouflage system was added in mid-2008. In late 2010, the tank squadron added five of the new Leopard 2A4Ms. The tank squadron operated with the three different Leopards until it was pulled from combat operations. The C2 MEXAS with the mine ploughs, mine rollers and the dozers were used alongside the Leopard 2's, until a bracket was installed for the Leopard 2A6M to mount them.

After an initial assessment of the Leopard C2's performance in Afghanistan, Canada decided to invest in Leopard 2 tanks. It was determined that the lack of adequate air conditioning, essential in the searing heat of Afghanistan, was degrading the tank crew's war fighting ability. The Army later downplayed this factor, citing increased armour protection and the main gun armament as reasons for upgrading to the Leopard 2. After some public speculation, Canadian Defence Minister Hon. Gordon O'Connor clarified the situation in April 2007.

To meet immediate needs in Afghanistan, 20 of the Bundeswehr's stock of Leopard 2A6s were upgraded to the 2A6M standard and loaned to Canada at no cost by the German government. Two Leopard 2 Büffel ARVs were acquired at the same time. These vehicles were shipped from Germany to Afghanistan, with the first arriving on 16 August 2007.

For the long term, Canada planned to replace the borrowed Leopard 2 tanks with a purchase of 100 surplus vehicles from the Netherlands, including 20 Leopard 2A6Ms for combat service, 40 Leopard 2A4s for training and 20 support vehicles, such as ARVs, Bridge-Layers and AEVs.

The older Leopard C2 tanks were considered completely obsolete by 2015, but specific plans for them have not yet been announced. Until deployment with the Canadian Forces in Afghanistan, the Leopard 1 C2 had never seen active combat.

In February 2018, Canada attempted to sell the surplus Leopard 1C2 tanks to the Jordanian Armed Forces. In July, it was announced that the sale fell through and the Canadian Department of National Defence has yet to decide what to do with the surplus vehicles. Daniel Le Bouthillier, a spokesperson for the Canadian Department of National Defense, said "the last option would be to destroy the tanks."

As of November 2021, no buyer was found for the Canadian Army's Leopard 1C2 tanks, "About 45 retired Canadian Army tanks will soon be used for target practice at the Cold Lake Air Weapons Range." A Vegreville Alberta company, Quest Disposal & Recycling Inc., was contracted to repurpose them to be used for target practice at Cold Lake Air Weapons Range, and the tanks were at the company's site being processed in December 2021.

=== Denmark ===
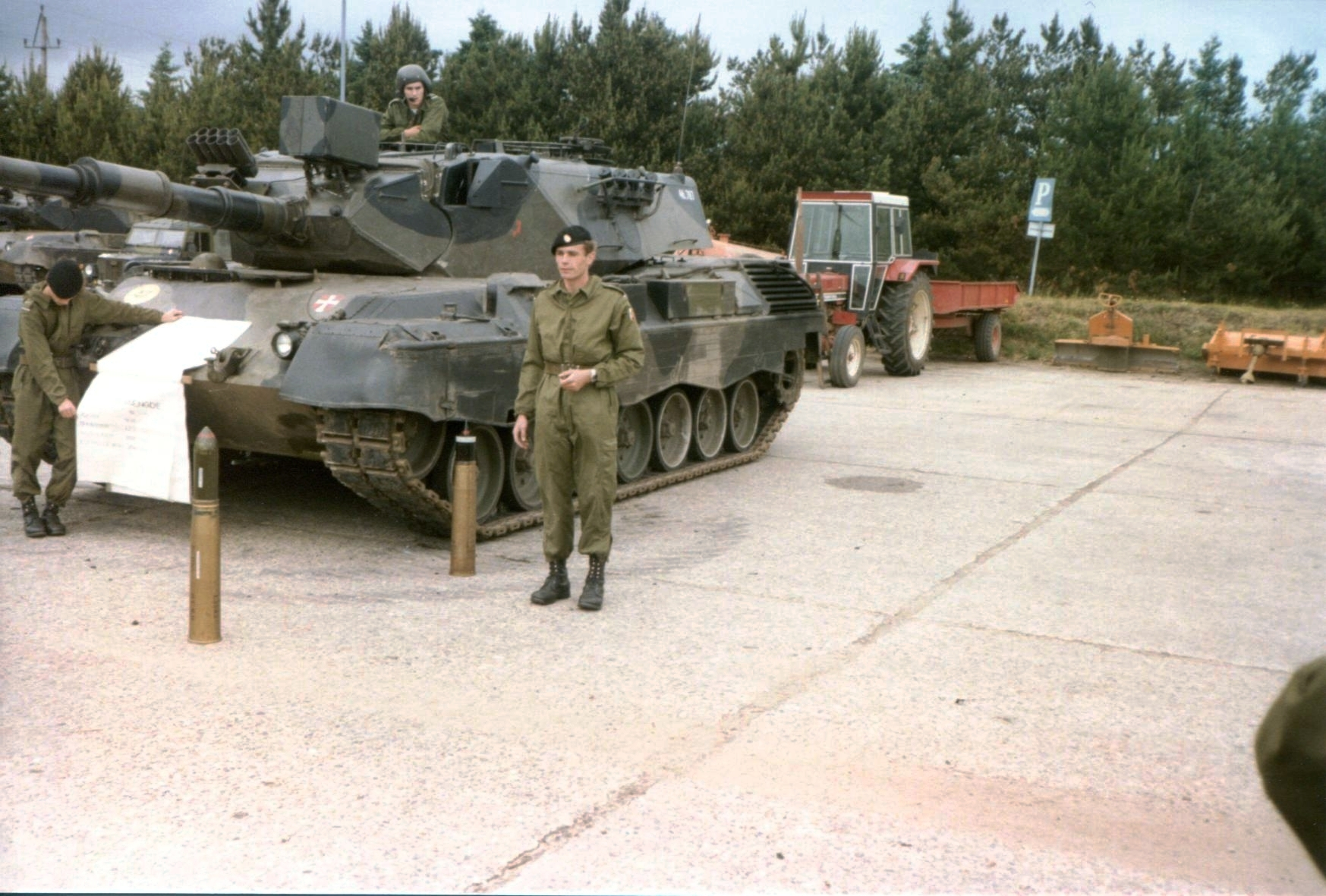
Leopard 1 DK

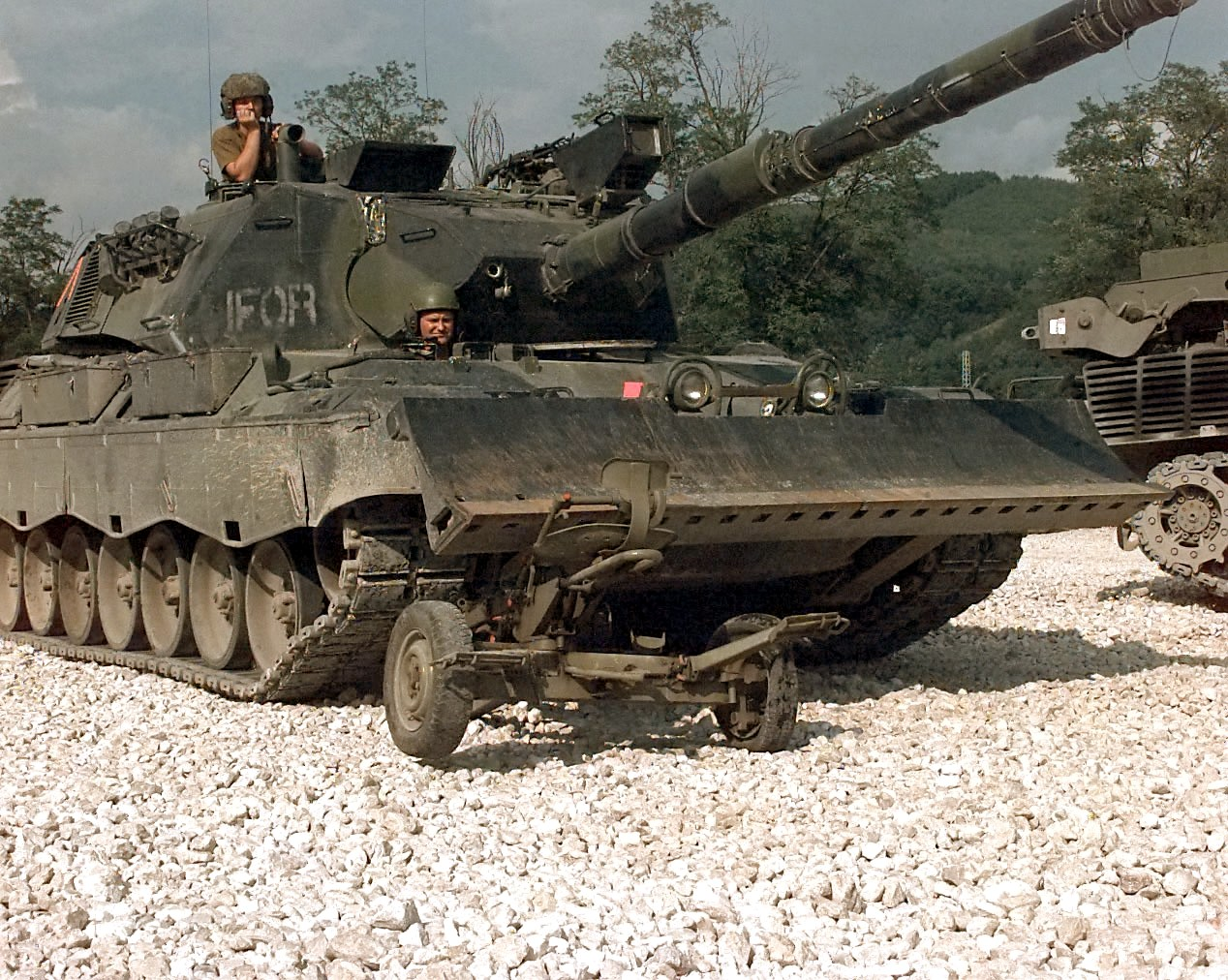
A Danish Leopard 1A5-DK

In 1976, Denmark acquired 120 Leopard 1A3 tanks, which were designated Leopard 1 DK. Delivery was completed in 1978. In 1989, an order for an additional 110 (used) German tanks (100 A3 and 10 A4) was placed; the vehicles were delivered from 1992-1994, partly through Conventional Forces Europe treaty AFV reduction requirements. These tanks were upgraded to Leopard 1A5-DK, along with the first 120 Leopards. Being fitted with the welded turret of the Leopard 1A3, the Danish Leopard 1A5-DK tanks were not identical to the German Leopard 1A5, which were fitted with the cast turrets. An additional upgrade was issued to the 35 leopard 1A5DK that were sent to Bosnia through the UNPROFOR/SFOR mission. This variant was named 1A5DK-1 and was upgraded with air-condition, fire-suppression system, a Honda generator and a searchlight from the de-commissioned M41 DK1. Denmark had 230 Leopard (195 1A5-DK and 35 1A5DK-1) in service from 1995, until their retirement and complete replacement by the Leopard 2A5-DK tanks in 2005.

These Leopards were involved in one of the most important engagements in modern Danish military history, which became known as Operation Bøllebank. Denmark was the only Scandinavian country to send a significant tank force to support their peacekeeping operations in Croatia and Bosnia. On 29 April 1994, near the city of Tuzla, seven Danish Leopard 1A5 tanks were involved in a skirmish between UNPROFORs Nordic Battalion (NORDBAT 2) and Bosnian-Serb military forces from the Šekovići brigade. The tanks were sent out to relieve a Swedish-manned observation post that had come under ambush fire by the Bosnian-Serb forces. On the tanks' arrival at the observation post, they were shelled by mortar fire and anti-tank rockets, which led the UN marked and white-painted Leopard 1A5 tanks to return fire. No casualties were suffered by either the Swedish observation post or the Danish tanks. Serbian casualties were estimated as high as 150 soldiers. This is believed to be the first hostile engagement involving the Leopard 1 tank.

The Danish Army had/has the following variants:

- 120 Leopard 1A3 (1976-1993) All upgraded into 1A5Dk
- 230 Leopard 1A5DK (1993-2005) (120(from 1976) + 110 "new A5")
- 35 Leopard 1A5DK-1 (1995 -2005) (35 1A5DK was upgraded to the new version)
- 16 Berger ARV (1993-2011) All Upgraded into FFG Wisent's (10 ARV + 6 AEV)
  - 10 FFG Wisent ARV (2011– present)
  - 4 FFG Wisent AEV Mine clearing vehicle (2011 – present)
  - 2 FFG Wisent AEV (2011– present)
- 10 Biber AVLB (1994–2023)
- 6 driving school cabin (1976-?)

Denmark sold 100 of its last Leopard 1A5DK tanks to FFG in Flensburg, Germany in 2010. In February 2023, Germany approved 178 Leopard 1 main battle tanks for export to Ukraine, and Denmark announced it would jointly purchase around 100 Leopard 1A5 main battle tanks with Germany and the Netherlands for Ukraine. 90 of the Danish Leopard tanks at FFG are expected to be part of this transfer.

=== Greece ===
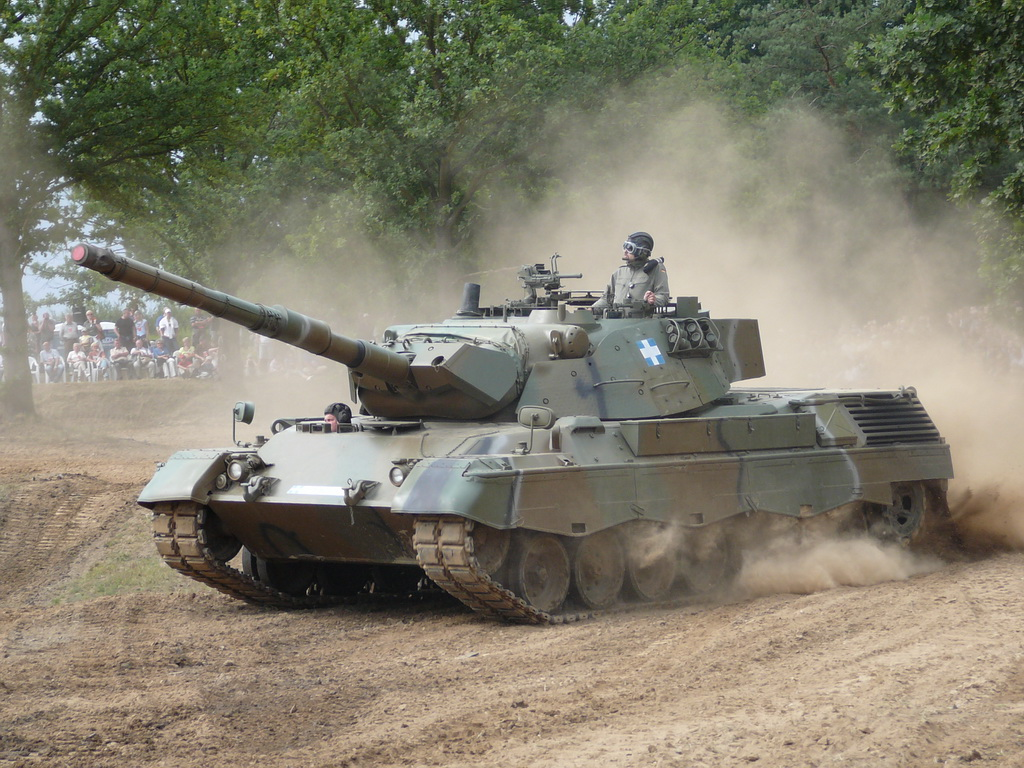
An ex-Greek Leopard 1V at Military Museum Lešany

Greece bought its first 104 Leopard 1A3 GR tanks during 1983–1984. They are actually Leopard 1A3s, but came with an EMES 12A3 FCS and some other modifications required by the Greek army at that time. During 1992, the Greek army received a batch of 75 Leopard 1A5 as offsets for the construction of four MEKO 200 frigates. Some months later, Greece received another batch of 170 Leopard 1V and 2 Leopard 1A5 from the Royal Netherlands army – the Leopard 1V is basically an 1A1 with an EMES 12A3 AFSL-2 FCS and spaced turret armor.

From 1998 until 2000, Greece bought 192 used Leopard 1A5s as offsets for the upgrade of the Greek F-4 aircraft in Germany in a symbolic price. In 2001, the Greek army decided to upgrade 104 Leopard 1A4GR and 120 Leopard 1V to the A5+ version, costing 234 million dollars. The programme was cancelled because Greece received a batch of 150 Leopard 1A5s along with the newly built Leopard 2A6 HEL. As of 2011, Greece is the largest user of Leopard 1 tanks, having over 500 Leopard 1A5 GR MBTs as well as many ST, Biber and Leguan versions.

Greece is negotiating with Germany to supply nearly 100 of their Leopard 1A5s to Ukraine in exchange for these being backfilled on a one-to-one basis with Italian Leopard 1A5 tanks purchased from Swiss company RUAG and refurbished and upgraded by Rheinmetall.

=== Italy ===
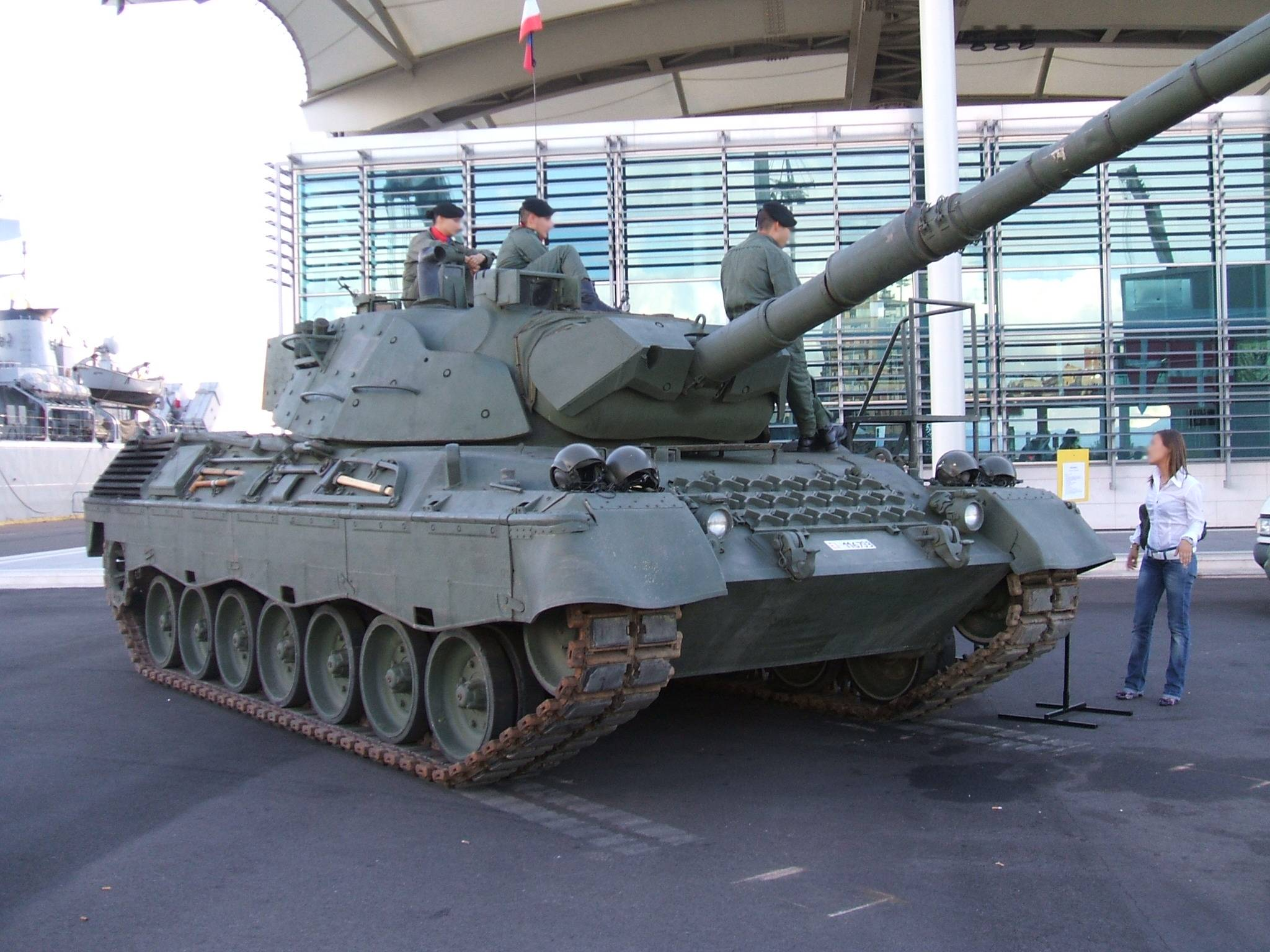
An Italian Leopard 1A5 in 2008

Italy had to replace an enormous number of M47 Pattons, with over 2,000 received from US stocks, but unlike other NATO members did not instigate a national project to achieve this. Its army, not entirely satisfied by the M60 Patton (300 delivered, of those 200 were produced by OTO Melara), placed its first order for the Leopard 1 in 1970. 200 Leopard 1A1 and 69 Bergepanzer 2 were delivered between 1971 and 1972. The vehicles replaced the M47 in the Italian Army's Cavalry Brigade "Pozzuolo del Friuli".

A further 600 Leopard 1A2 and 67 Bergepanzer 2 were built in Italy by OTO Melara, with deliveries starting in 1975; a second batch of 120 was built by OTO Melara between 1980 and 1983. All Italian-built Leopards were A2s, but without stabilizers or skirts. The 200 A1s originally bought from Germany were partially upgraded later to this standard. Forty Pionierleopards (AEV), nine school (for drivers, without armament) and 64 Bibers (AVLB) were ordered in 1985. Twelve of the Pionierleopard were produced in Germany, the rest by OTO Melara in Italy. All of the Bibers were assembled by OTO Melara in Italy.

By the end, Italy was the biggest customer of the Leopard outside Germany with 920 plus 249 special versions, the only one with a licence production, and the only country that produced both the M60 and Leopard 1. The Leopard was the basis for Italian MBTs and heavy artillery systems, starting with Leone/Lion and the following OF-40, leading to other developments like the Palmaria and OTOMATIC artillery systems (both on an OF-40 hull). The experience made possible the development of the C1 Ariete, after the Italian army decided in 1984 to have a new national tank, rather than buying 300 Leopard 2s.

At the end of the Cold War, the Italian Army began an upgrade and a downsizing of its armoured units. A number of Leopards were retired in 1991, along with its fleet of M60 tanks. In 1995, Italy bought 120 surplus A5 turrets from the Bundeswehr, which were mounted on the same number of reworked A2 hulls. These tanks took part in the various peacekeeping missions in the Balkans, never seeing action.

The last A1/A2 was retired in 2003, with the last A5 going in 2008, leaving the Ariete as the sole tank in Italian service. The AEVs, ARVs and AVLBs have been reduced in number and some have been modified to work with the Ariete. They are stated to serve for some more years, as no replacement has been selected yet.

A deal to sell nearly 100 Leopard 1A5 tanks stored in Lenta to a South American country fell through in 2022.

=== Netherlands ===
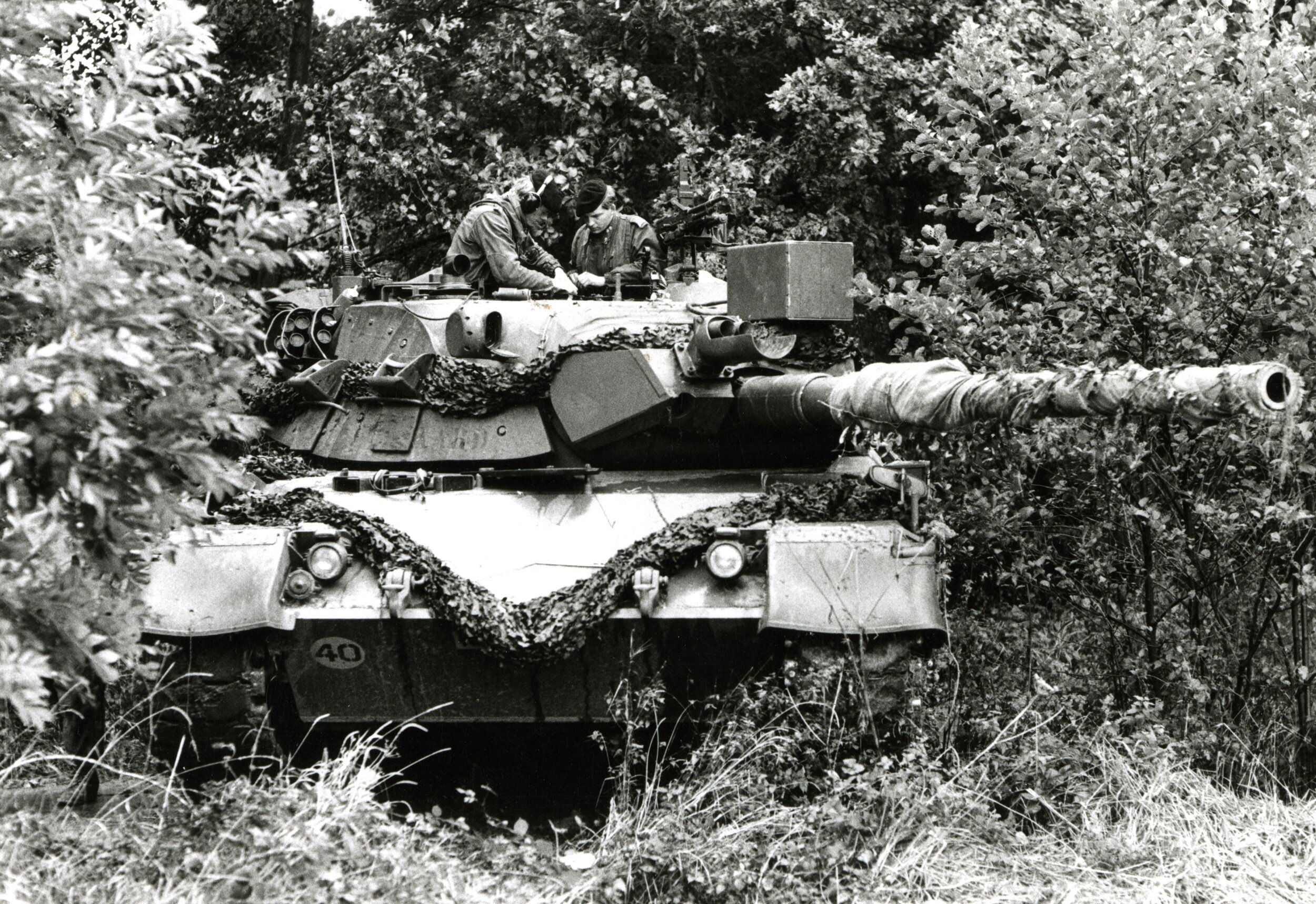
The Dutch upgraded their Leopard 1A1s acquired between 1969–1972 to the Leopard 1V standard seen here. The vehicle received spaced turret armour and a new fire control system. A Dutch-built gunfire simulation device is mounted on the mantlet, to the right of the gun barrel.

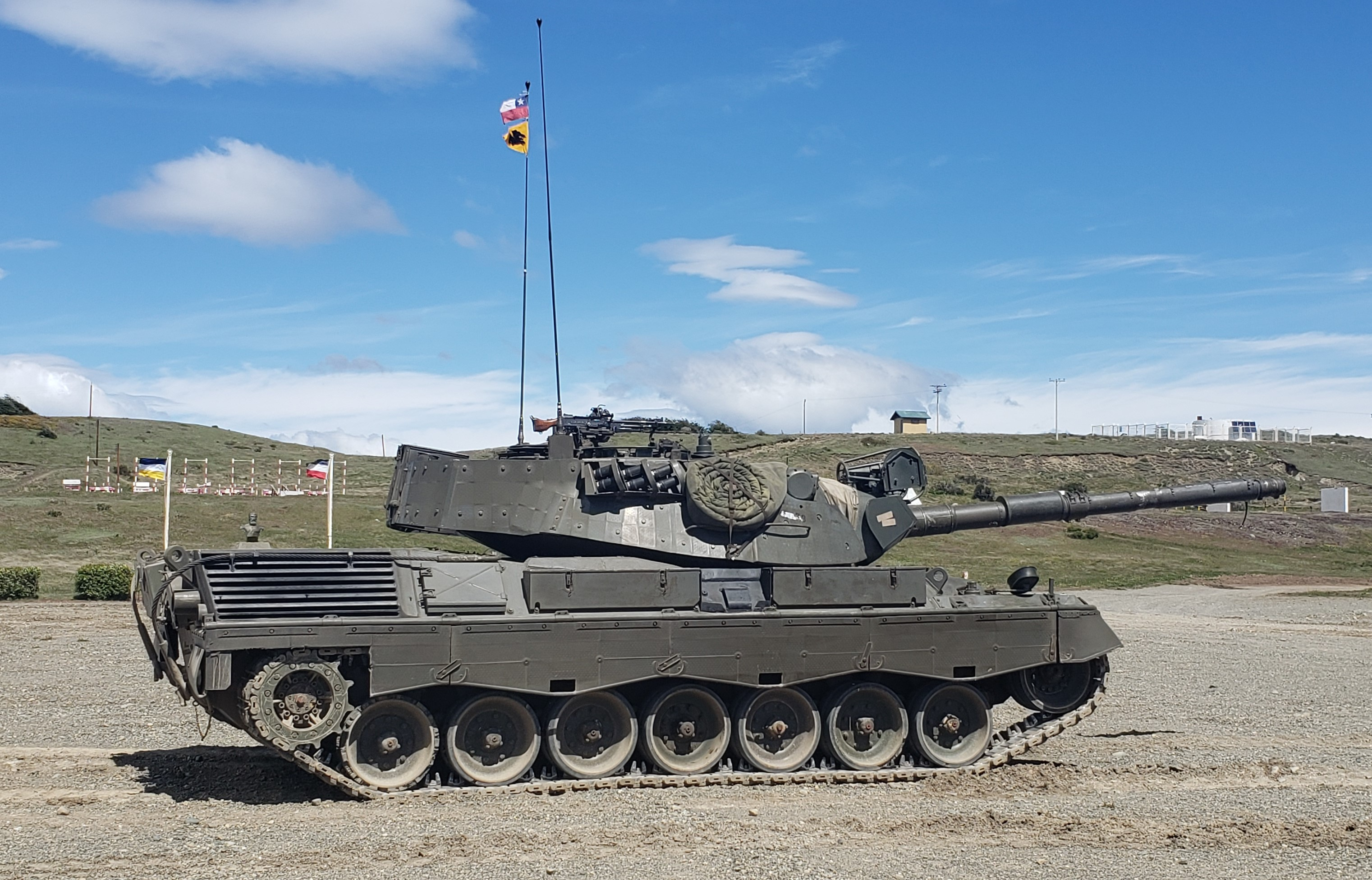
A Chilean Army Leopard 1V

The Royal Netherlands Army ordered a total 468 Leopard 1 tanks from the fourth production series, built between October 1969 and March 1972, as a partial replacement for the Centurion tank. The initial order for 415 vehicles was placed on 27 December 1968 but was soon expanded to include another 53 tanks and 30 armoured recovery vehicles (subsequently increased to 51) following the Soviet invasion of Czechoslovakia. Dutch tanks were built with participation from local industry, including components supplied by companies such as DAF. They were equipped with US radio sets using US-style antenna bases and a Dutch-designed smoke discharger system consisting of six launchers grouped into three pairs on either side of the turret. There were additional stowage boxes provided on the fenders around the hull and the FN MAG was used as secondary armament instead of the MG 3. At a later date, Dutch tanks were upgraded with a gun stabilization system from Honeywell and new optics for use with British-designed APDS ammunition.

In 1987, all remaining Dutch Leopard 1s were upgraded to the Leopard 1V (Verbeterd or "improved") standard, which involved the provision of the EMES 12A3 AFSL-2 fire control system built to Dutch specifications by Honeywell and Zeiss as well as the spaced turret armour add-on package by Blohm & Voss. The program was plagued by technical challenges with the new fire control system, which rendered a significant number of upgraded tanks inoperable for a period of time, and cost overruns. By early 1995, the Leopard 1V was phased out of Dutch service without a replacement, with most vehicles either donated to Greece or sold to Chile. Approximately 50 tanks were retained for various purposes, including to be used as monuments, museum pieces, targets for live weapons practice, driver training vehicles and other niche applications.

=== Turkey ===
The Turkish Army upgraded its Leopard 1 tanks to a version called the Leopard 1T 'Volkan'. The modernization program included the serial production and integration of the Volkan fire control system developed by ASELSAN. The new indigenous system provides the capability of detecting the targets in daylight or at night in all weather conditions and combat environments. It significantly increases the first round hit probability on the move and also improve the usage life over 20 years.

Turkey's other batch of Leo 1A3s are dubbed as Leo 1A3T1 and are actually 1A3A3s with EMES-12A3 fire control system.

=== Ukraine ===
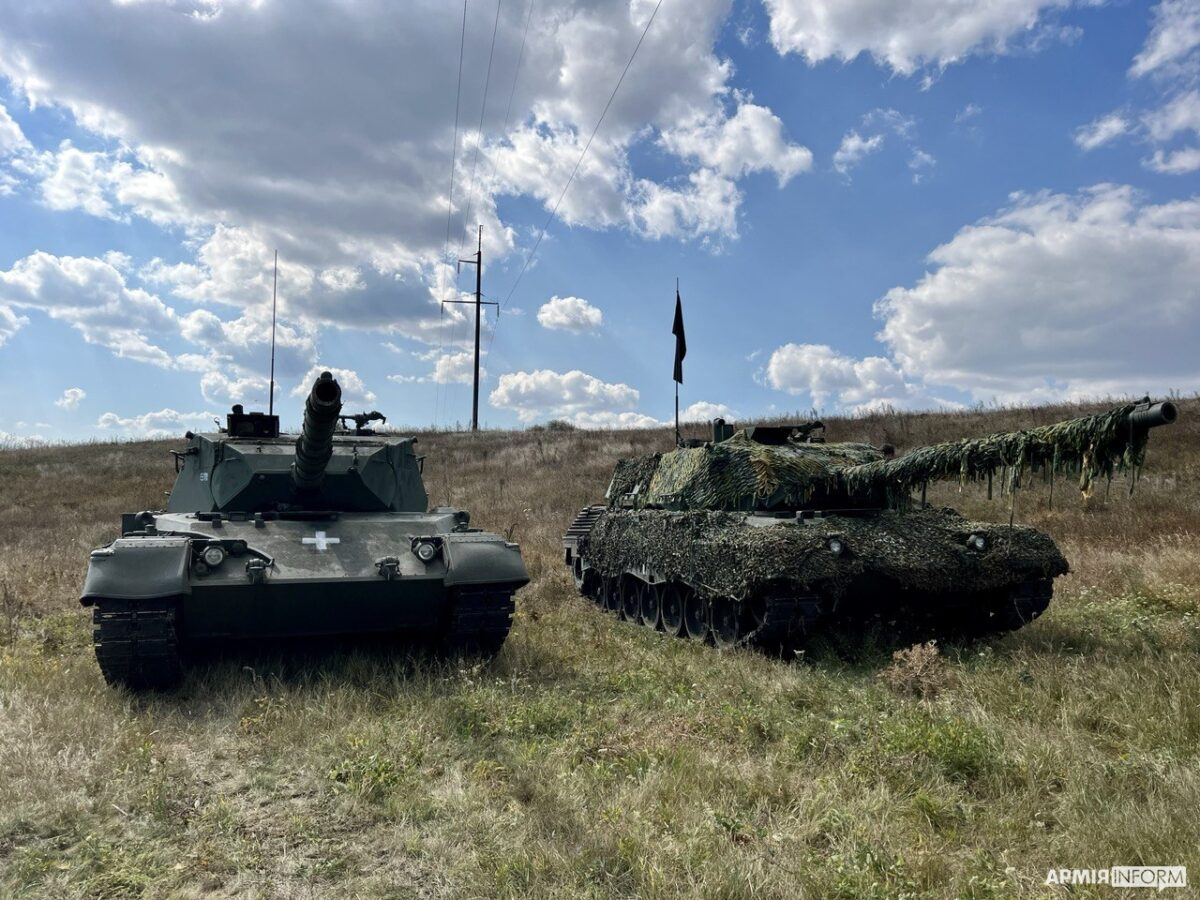
Two Leopard 1A5DK of the Ukrainian Air Assault Forces, September 2023

==== Procurement problems ====
At the outbreak of the full-scale phase of the Russo-Ukrainian War, Rheinmetall sought to buy back 96 Leopard 1A5IT tanks at the beginning of March 2022 from the Swiss company RUAG, refurbish the tanks, and deliver them via a third country to Ukraine. Rheinmetall and RUAG signed a tentative purchase agreement for these tanks before a formal application for their sale and export was made with Swiss government authorities. Rheinmetall then requested an export permit for 88 Leopard 1A5 tanks to Ukraine in April 2022 along with 100 Marder IFVs it already had in its stocks.

On 7 February 2023, the German federal government approved the export of 178 Leopard 1A5 main battle tanks to Ukraine, which included 88 Leopard 1A5 Rheinmetall claimed to have, and 90 Leopard 1A5DK available from FFG stocks. Germany, Denmark and the Netherlands subsequently issued a statement that the three countries would jointly finance the purchase of "at least" 100 Leopard 1A5 tanks. On 13 February, Rheinmetall and RUAG signed a more formal agreement for the purchase of the 96 Leopard 1A5IT tanks stored in Italy, although this contract was also not formally approved by RUAG's management or board of directors.

In May, Denmark's acting Defense Minister Troels Lund Poulsen clarified in an interview that the joint-venture included 80 Leopard 1A5DK from FFG co-financed by Denmark and Germany. Germany committed an additional 30 Leopard 1A5 tanks for Ukraine on 13 May 2023 as part of a new $2.95 billion military aid package. Canada agreed to supply 1,800 rounds of 105 mm training ammunition for the Leopard 1 tanks going to Ukraine.

The Dutch contribution to the German-Danish-Dutch Leopard 1 consortium has not been made public, and the Netherlands was not included with Denmark on Germany's formal list of military aid to Ukraine until an update was made on March 29, 2024. In April 2023, it was reported that the Netherlands had planned to finance the purchase of the 88 Leopard 1A5IT tanks Rheinmetall had claimed to have, although these were still not in Rheinmetall's possession since a formal export permit had not been granted from the Swiss government. In June, the Swiss Federal Council formally rejected RUAG's request for an export permit, blocking Rheinmtall's acquisition and the Netherlands ability to buy the tanks for Ukraine.

Belgium was negotiating with OIP Land Systems over the purchase of an additional 50 Leopard 1A5BE tanks sold to the company in 2014, but could not come to an agreement on price. On 11 July, Germany pledged a new €700 million aid package, which included additional Leopard 1 tanks for Ukraine on top of those previously pledged. Rheinmetall subsequently purchased all 50 Leopard 1A5BE from OIP Land Systems to fulfill this obligation. 30 of these 50 tanks are to be refurbished for active service and 20 used for spare parts. On 14 November, Rheinmetall issued an update that only 25 were to be used for main battle tanks, 5 would be converted to Bergepanzer 2 armoured recovery vehicles, and 2 used for driver training vehicles.

Denmark pledged an additional 30 Leopard 1 tanks to Ukraine on 19 September 2023, as part of a larger US$830 million aid package. The source of these tanks was not disclosed, with the Danish Defense Minister stating they would be purchased from other countries that had these tanks available. These tanks were in addition to the 80 1A5DKs previously financed with Germany, bringing the total number of Leopard 1A5 publicly pledged by Denmark and Germany to Ukraine to 165, although as many as 195 tanks may be financed already since Dutch contributions are not public.

The status of the 96 Leopard 1A5IT remains in legal limbo. Acquiring these tanks for Ukraine has been complicated by the Swiss government's refusal to sell the tanks to third countries due to neutrality concerns, as well as the discovery that 25 of these 96 were already purchased by Bavarian firm Global Logistics Support GmbH (GLS) back in 2019. Germany considered negotiating with Greece the transfer of nearly 100 of their Leopard 1A5 tanks in exchange for Rheinmetall backfilling them on a one-to-one basis with the remaining Leopard 1s available from RUAG. However the matter was further complicated when Italian NGO OPAL discovered that Agenzia italiana difesa (AID), which sold the tanks to RUAG in 2016, did not have the necessary export permits to conclude the sale to RUAG in the first place, and no approval was provided by the licensing authority Uama. As such, the legal ownership of the tanks is unclear. The Swiss Federal Audit Office, the German Public Prosecutor's Office, and the Italian government are investigating the matter to clarify the tanks' legal status, which could enable their eventual delivery to Ukraine. However, on May 28, 2025, Switzerland green-lit the sale of its 71 remaining Leopard 1A5IT tanks held by RUAG to Germany, albeit on the condition that they were not sold to Ukraine. The sale to Rheinmetall was completed on 5 June 2025.

GLS finally waived its claims to the remaining 25 Leopard 1A5IT tanks after an out-of-court settlement, allowing RUAG to finally complete the sale of the remaining tanks to Rheinmetall and close its Italian warehouse storing the vehicles on 26 June 2025.

==== Delivery difficulties and delays ====
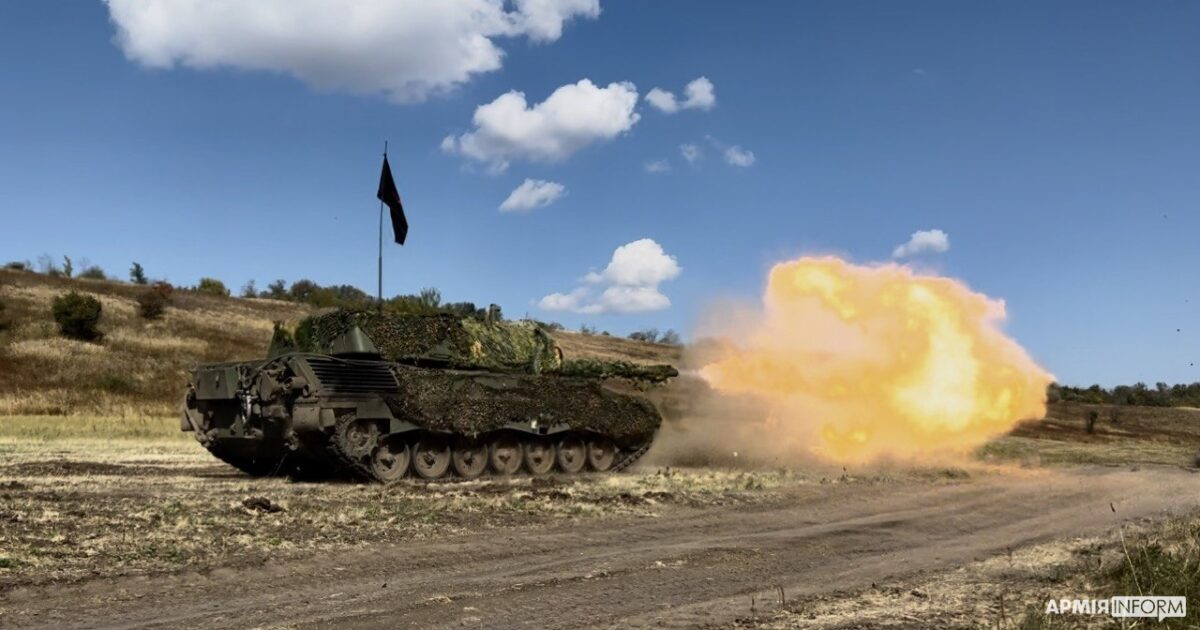
Ukrainian Leopard 1A5DK during a training, September 2023

Denmark's Defense Minister stated on 11 March 2023 that the first batch of Leopard 1 tanks should be delivered to Ukraine by the spring. However, Germany's Defence Minister Boris Pistorius told his Ukrainian counterpart Oleksii Reznikov that 20-25 tanks would be delivered by the summer, around 80 by the end of 2023, and an additional 100 in 2024. The first 10 were delivered to Ukraine by 18 July 2023. An additional 10 were delivered by 29 August, aligning with the delivery schedule given by Pistorius. However, the second batch of 10 Leopard 1A5 tanks to be delivered from Germany was refused by Ukraine due to the vehicles' poor condition and the lack of available spare parts and engineers to repair the vehicles in Ukraine. German experts travelled to Poland and confirmed the tanks required repairs due to the extensive training the vehicles performed in the preceding weeks. Germany agreed to cooperate on the tank repairs before their delivery. As of May 2024, only 30 Leopard 1A5 had arrived in Ukraine. However, an additional 60 tanks were turned over but at the behest of the Ukrainian Armed Forces training in Germany was extended; an additional 20 tanks will be fully upgraded by June by FFG, and the 25 1A5BEs will be refurbished by Rheinmetall by mid year.

By 17 April 2025, 103 Leopard 1 tanks had been delivered to Ukraine with at least 22 pending delivery. The delivery of any additional Leopard 1 tanks (including those acquired from RUAG) will not be made public, as the new German government under Chancellor of Germany Friedrich Merz amended its policy to no longer publicize details about Germany's military aid and delivery schedule to Ukraine.

==== Active combat ====
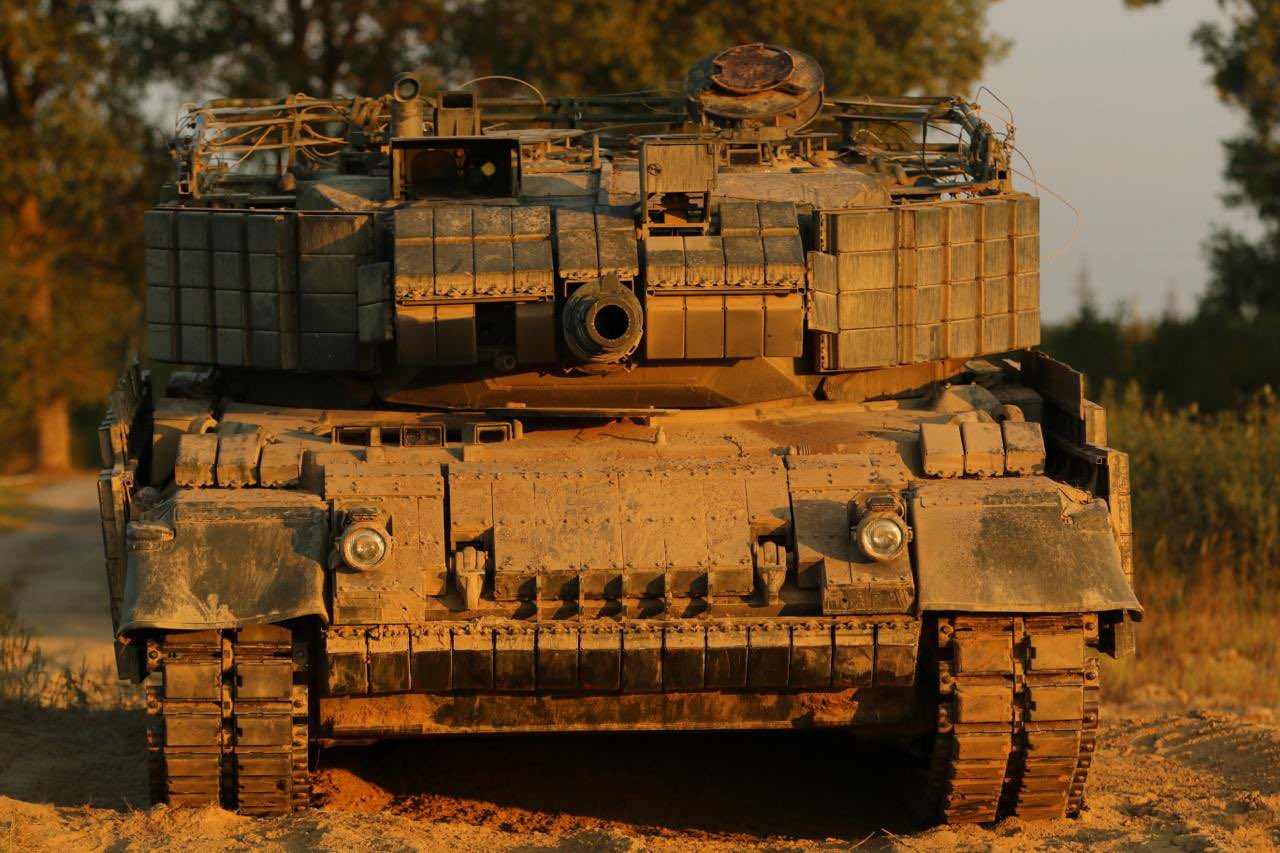
Leopard 1A5V of the 5th Heavy Mechanized Brigade, 10th Army Corps with Kontakt-1 ERA blocks

Beginning in summer 2023, Ukrainian Wisent 1 mine clearing vehicles and Bergepanzer 2 armored recovery vehicles were used in the 2023 Ukrainian counteroffensive in the Zaporizhzhia direction, with at least one Wisent 1 being visually confirmed lost, and at least one Bergepanzer 2 suffering damage.

On 18 October, the Ministry of Defence of Ukraine announced the official adoption of the Leopard 1A5, along with the Leopard 2A5 and 2A6.

Footage of a destroyed Ukrainian Leopard 1A5 and Bergepanzer 2 appeared on social media in summer 2024.

Leopard 1 local upgrades

By September 2024, members of the Ukrainian 5th Separate Tank Brigade (now 5th Heavy Mechanized Brigade, part of 10th Army Corps) had upgraded their Leopard 1s to a standard that they dubbed "Leopard 1A5V". The Leopard 1A5V includes new additions such as extra armor, ERA blocks on the turret, front, and mid sections of the tank, as well as an extendable cage with netting to protect the turret from drones.

== Operators ==
=== Current ===
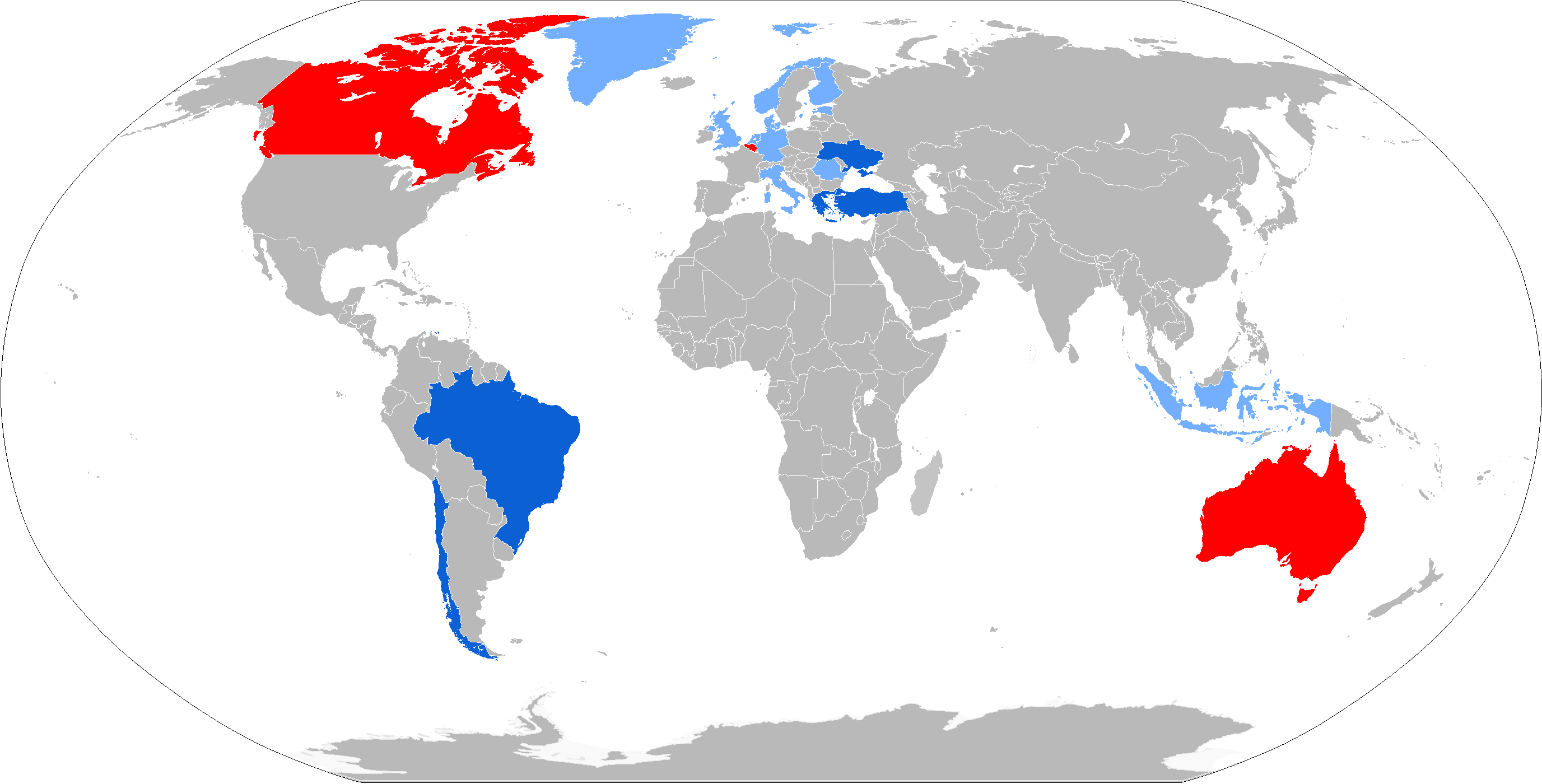
Leopard 1 operators as of 2023. Current operators of Leopard 1 tanks Current operators of specialty variants Former operators

Country	Type	Quantity (Estimated)	Origin	Notes
Brazil	1A1BR	128 (36 active)	Germany	128 Leopard 1A1s originally purchased from Belgium. Upgraded to BR standard, 36 remain in active service as of 2021, with 12 assigned to the 4th, 6th and 9th Armoured Cavalry Regiments respectively.
Brazil	1A5BR	250 (230 active)	Germany	Brazil had sought to purchase an additional 96 Italian Leopard 1A5IT from Swiss firm RUAG in 2017, but the deal fell through. As of 2021, 20 of the 1A5BR are used for spare parts. 52 1A5BR were planned to be modernized with a new turret between 2024 and 2030, possibly with the John Cockerill 105mm auto-loading turret or the Hitfact II 120 mm turret. However, in September 2023 it was announced that Brazil's 1A5 modernization had been postponed "indefinitely" due to a lack of available spare parts, as Leopard 1 support had been prioritized for Ukraine.
Brazil	Bergepanzer 2 ARV	7	Germany	Purchased in 2009 with Leopard 1A5s.
Brazil	Pionierpanzer 2 Dachs AEV	6	Germany	Purchased in 2009 with Leopard 1A5s.
Brazil	Biber AVLB	4	Germany	Purchased in 2009 with Leopard 1A5s.
Chile	1V	202	Germany	Purchased from the Netherlands in 1997. Mostly moved to reserve units or placed in storage after the purchase of 140 Leopard 2A4 tanks in 2006. In 2021, the army commissioned Fabricas y Maestranzas del Ejercito (Famae) to begin dismantling many of the 1V tanks in order to obtain spare parts for the maintenance and repair of the remaining tanks in active service. The 1V remains active with the Armored Group No. 6 Dragones of the 4th Armored Brigade Chorrillos and the Armored Detachment No. 5 Lanceros.
Denmark	Biber AVLB	10	Germany	230 Leopard 1A5DK originally purchased. Retired and replaced with Leopard 2. 100 Leopard 1A5DK sold to FFG in Germany. Biber AVLB still operated. Spare tanks converted into Wisent support vehicles. On 11 April, Troels Lund Poulsen, Denmark's Acting Defence Minister, said that Denmark hopes to provide Ukraine with "about 100" Leopard 1A5 tanks before end of 2023, the first batch "before summer". These A5 versions have night vision and digital fire control.
Denmark	Wisent 1 ARV	10	West Germany	See Biber AVLB notes.
Denmark	Wisent 1 AEV	6	West Germany	See Biber AVLB notes.
Denmark	Wisent 1 MC	10	Germany; Denmark	Denmark was the first country to receive the mine clearing variant of the Wisent 1, developed by FFG.
Estonia	Bergepanzer 2 ARV	4	West Germany	Purchased from the Netherlands along with Dachs AEV and Biber AVLB in 2015.
Estonia	Pionierpanzer 2 Dachs AEV	5	West Germany	See Bergepanzer 2 ARV notes.
Estonia	Biber AVLB	2	West Germany	See Bergepanzer 2 ARV notes.
Finland	Bergepanzer 2 ARV	8	West Germany	Sixteen ARV/AEV vehicles purchased from the Netherlands in 2017 for €8,2 million.
Finland	Pionierpanzer 2 Dachs AEV	8	West Germany	See Bergepanzer 2 ARV notes.
Germany	Pionierpanzer 2 Dachs AEV	83	West Germany	2,437 Leopard 1 tanks originally ordered. Retired and replaced by the Leopard 2. Remaining Leopard 1 tanks are in long-term storage, at tank recycling facilities, or held by private defence companies for resale. As of 2023, Rheinmetall has 100 Leopard 1A5 tanks, 88 of which are suitable for service and are being retrofitted and sent to Ukraine. FFG has another 99 Leopard 1A5DK tanks purchased from Denmark in 2008; 90 of these being repurposed for transfer to Ukraine. The Bundeswehr still uses limited numbers of ARV, AEV, and AVLB; some held in storage provided to Ukraine.
Germany	Biber AVLB	40	West Germany	Some provided to Ukraine in 2022 and 2023.
Greece	1A5GR	501	West Germany	In May 2022 it was reported that Greece was in discussions with KMW to upgrade and modernize its Leopard 1A5s.
Greece	1A4GR	19	West Germany	Some of the remaining 85 Leopard 1A4GR and 170 Leopard 1V/INL have been converted to support vehicles or have been used for parts, the rest will be scrapped.
Greece	Bergepanzer 2 ARV	43	West Germany	Some converted from retired 1A4GR.
Greece	Biber AVLB	10	West Germany	Some converted from retired 1A4GR.
Greece	1V Mine Clearer	10	West Germany	The weapon was removed (in accordance with the Conventional Armed Forces Agreement), while Pearson Engineering added a full-width mine plow.
Greece	1A3 Mine Clearer	30	West Germany	The weapon was removed (in accordance with the Conventional Armed Forces Agreement). Equipped with mine rollers.
Indonesia	Pionierpanzer 2 Dachs AEV	3	Germany	3 in active service.
Indonesia	Biber AVLB	3	Germany	3 in active service.
Italy	Leopard 1A5IT	N/A	West Germany; Italy	200 Leopard 1A2 tanks originally purchased from West Germany in 1971; an additional 403 1A2 domestically manufactured under license by OTO Melara. Italy's 483 Leopard 1A2s were stored in the Lenta Army Depot until they were all dismantled and scrapped as of 2020. 120 Leopard 1A5IT domestically manufactured under license by OTO Melara. Another 120 1A5 turrets were purchased and fitted onto 1A2 hulls in the 1990s. All 240 were retired from service by the end of 2008 (replaced by Ariete main battle tank). Of these 240, at least 96 remain in storage at the Lenta Army Depot as of 2024. About 100 were sold to Agenzia italiana difesa (AID), which sold 4 to a South American buyer, and 96 to the Swiss company RUAG in 2016. RUAG sold 25 of to Bavarian firm Global Logistics Support GmbH (GLS) in 2019, although these were never transferred to GLS and remain at Lenta. However, in 2023, it was reported that AID had not acquired the necessary export permits or approval from the licensing authority Uama to sell the tanks to RUAG. The Italian government is now reviewing the 2016 sale to determine the legal status and ownership of the tanks.
Italy	Bergepanzer 2 ARV	136	Italy	About 250 ARV, AEV, and AVLB domestically manufactured under license by OTO Melara. Of those, 235 AEVs, ARVs and ABLVs remain in active service as of 2023.
Italy	Pionierpanzer 2 Dachs AEV	40	Italy	See Bergepanzer 2 ARV notes.
Italy	Biber AVLB	59	Italy	See Bergepanzer 2 ARV notes.
Lithuania	Bergepanzer 2 ARV	10	Germany	Procured over 2015-2016 time period as alongside Panzerhaubitze 2000.
Netherlands	Biber AVLB	8	West Germany	468 Leopard 1 tanks originally purchased. Retired and replaced with Leopard 2. Most sold off to other countries, including 200 sold to Chile and 170 sold to Greece, the rest converted into ARV/AEV vehicles or moved to storage. Only 8 Biber Bridgelayers remain in service; Pionierpanzer 2 Dachs replaced with AEV 3 Kodiak, Bergepanzer 2 retired from service.
Netherlands	Hippo BRV	4	Germany; United Kingdom	The Netherlands Marine Corps operates four Dutch Leopard 1V-based Beach Recovery Vehicles known as Hercules, Samson, Goliath and Titan, which operate out of the Royal Netherlands Navy assault ships of the Rotterdam class. The vehicles have a similar specification but a different cabin appearance to the UK's Hippo.
Norway	Bergepanzer 2 ARV "NM217 Bergepanservogn"	11	West Germany	172 Leopard 1 tanks originally purchased. Retired and replaced by Leopard 2. The final remaining Leopard 1A5 were decommissioned in 2011 after a ceremony marking 42 years of service. ARVs, AEVs, and Bridgelayers remain in service. 2 of 13 Bergepanzer 2 ARV transferred to Ukraine in 2023.
Norway	Pionierpanzer 2 Dachs AEV "NM189 Ingeniørpanservogn"	20	West Germany	See Bergepanzer 2 ARV notes. 2 transferred to Ukraine.
Norway	Biber AVLB "NM190 Broleggerpanservogn"	9	West Germany	See Bergepanzer 2 ARV notes.
Romania	Bergepanzer 2 ARV	3	Germany	Donated by KMW in May 2007 to assist in the maintenance of Gepard SPAAGs donated in 1998.
Turkey	1A3T1	184	West Germany	227 Leopard 1A3s with EMES systems were originally purchased along with 170 1A1s. An estimated 184 1A3s are still active, the rest used for spare parts or for support vehicles.
Turkey	1T Volkan	170	West Germany; Turkey	All A1s upgraded domestically to Leopard 1T 'Volkan' standard.
Turkey	Bergepanzer 2 ARV	16	Germany	Using 1A3 chassis.
United Kingdom	Hippo BRV	4	Germany; United Kingdom	4 Leopard 1A5 hulls have been adapted through extensive modification to create the Hippo beach recovery vehicle.
Ukraine	1A5 1A5BE 1A5DK 1A5IT	>135	Germany	178 initially approved for export by Germany in February 2023, and "at least 100" tanks were jointly pledged initially by Germany, Denmark, and the Netherlands. This initially included 80 of the 99 Leopard 1A5DK tanks held by FFG; the German Defence Ministry pledged an additional 30 Leopard 1A5 tanks for Ukraine on May 13, bringing the total up to 110. On July 11, Germany pledged additional Leopard 1 tanks at the NATO Summit in Vilnius; these were later sourced from 50 Leopard 1A5BE purchased in August by Rheinmetall from OIP Land Systems in Belgium and includes 25 1A5 main battle tanks, 2 training vehicles, and 5 Bergepanzer 2 ARVs, with the rest to be used for spare parts. The first 10 Leopard 1A5DK were delivered to Ukraine by 19 July 2023. As of January 2025, of the 135 tanks jointly pledged by Germany-Denmark-Netherlands, 103 were delivered to Ukraine and 22 were pending delivery. Rheinmetall delivered all financed 1A5BE tanks along with support and training vehicles in 2024. Both Rheinmetall and the Dutch government had attempted to procure an additional 96 Italian Leopard 1A5ITs stored in Italy from Swiss company RUAG since 2022. Although their sale was initially blocked by the Swiss government due to neutrality concerns, RUAG finally received approval to sell the vehicles back to Rheinmetall (though a stipulation was made that they not be transferred to Ukraine). 71 of the tanks were sold to Rheinmetall on 5 June 2025. GLS waived its claims to the remaining 25 tanks after an out-of-court settlement, allowing RUAG to finally sell the remaining tanks to Rheinmetall on June 26. 14 Leopard 1A5 destroyed and 4 damaged/abandoned as of 22 August 2025, according to the Oryx blog which uses OSINT war photography to confirm vehicle casualties.
Ukraine	Bergepanzer 2 ARV	24 (+9 on order)	Germany	The first Bergepanzer 2 arrived in Ukraine at an unknown date. 2 NM217 Bergepanservogn donated by Norway by March 2023. As of Feb 2025, 22 delivered and 9 more pending delivery from Germany. 1 visually confirmed damaged in combat.
Ukraine	Pionierpanzer 2 Dachs AEV	14	Germany	12 delivered by Germany by 2025, including 1 former Canadian "Badger" AEV refurbished by FFG. 2 "NM189 Ingeniørpanservogn" also delivered by Norway in 2023.
Ukraine	Biber AVLB	27	Germany	See Bergepanzer 2 ARV notes. All 27 delivered by Germany by 2025.
Ukraine	Wisent 1 MC	57	Germany	Ukraine to receive the Wisent 1 MC mine-clearing vehicle after FFG and Pearson Engineering were awarded a contract by the Danish Defence Acquisition and Logistics Organization. It became the second operator after Denmark to receive the vehicle, with the first two delivered by 30 March 2023. 57 delivered by 2025. 1 Wisent 1 MC visually confirmed destroyed in combat.
Ukraine	Fahrschulpanzer drive trainer	2	Germany	2 ex-Belgian Leopard 1A5BEs acquired from OIP Land Systems were converted into drive training vehicles by Rheinmetall and delivered to Ukraine in 2024.

=== Former operators ===
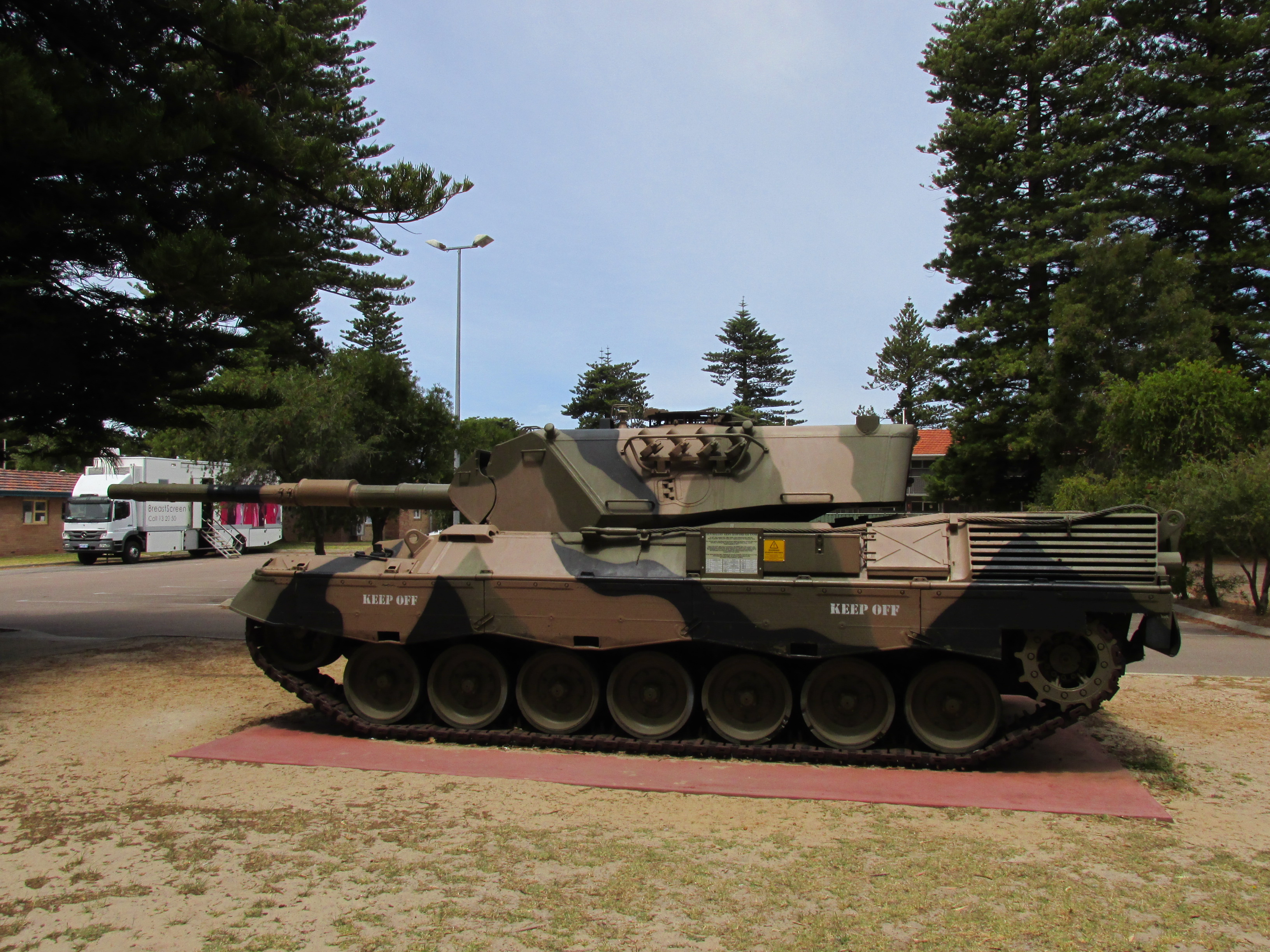
A retired Australian Army Leopard 1 on display in the town of Esperance, Western Australia

- Australia – 90 Leopard 1A3 tanks ("Leopard AS1") originally purchased and entered service in 1977 along with 5 Bridge-layers and 8 Armoured Recovery Vehicles. Retired in 2007 and replaced with 59 M1A1 Abrams from the US. 30 Leopard AS1 tanks were gifted to various veterans organizations throughout Australia, the remaining tanks and specialized vehicles were sold to defense companies.
- Belgium – 334 originally purchased. 132 upgraded to Leopard 1A5BE standard. Retired and replaced by 21 Mowag Piranha III with a 90 mm cannon. 50 were owned by OIP Land Systems and stored in Belgium for resale as of January 2023. These were all purchased by Rheinmetall in July 2023 for use in Ukraine.
- Canada – 114 Leopard C1 tanks originally ordered (equivalent to Leopard 1A3 with laser rangefinder) and received in 1978–79. 66 upgraded to Leopard C2 (Leopard 1A5 equivalent) beginning in 1996, some with additional MEXAS armour kits. 23 Leopard C1 were sold to companies in North America, 4 put in museums or used as monuments, and 21 decommissioned and turned into range targets in the early 2000s. The Leopard C2 was in active service from 1997 until 2017 and replaced with Leopard 2s. At least 3 Leopard C2 tanks were destroyed and 15 were damaged during Canada's operations in Afghanistan. Efforts were made to sell the retired Leopard C2 tanks to Jordan, but the deal fell through in 2018. 11 of the C2 tanks were given to museums. In 2021, around 45 of the remaining Leopard C2 tanks in storage were sent to Vegreville, Alberta to be converted into target pieces by Quest Disposal & Recycling Inc. for use at the Cold Lake Air Weapons Range. Brückenlegepanzer "Beaver" AVLB retired from service around 2017, and Pionierpanzer 2 "Badger" AEV retired in 2018 and replaced with WISENT 2 "Ram" manufactured in New Brunswick by FFG's Canadian subsidiary. Bergepanzer 2 ARV "Taurus" was still present on the Government of Canada's list of Armed Forces equipment as of February 2021. Retired and replaced with Bergepanzer BPz3 "Mammoth".

=== Failed bids ===
- Ecuador – Ecuador sought to purchase 30 Leopard 1V tanks from Chile in 2009, but the deal ultimately fell through.
- Lebanon – in 2007 Lebanon and Belgium signed a deal worth 3.5 million euros that would transfer 43 Leopard 1A5BE tanks and other armoured vehicles to the Lebanese Armed Forces. The Belgian APCs were delivered, however as of 2010 the 43 Leopard 1A5BE were not transferred due to the lack of an export permit from Germany. It is unclear if this export permit was ever granted as of 2018.

== See also ==
- Flakpanzer Gepard
- Leopard 3
