= List of aircraft weapons in production and in development by the European defence industry =

This list of military aircraft weapons in production and in development by the European defence industry aims at summarising the current status of the aerospace defence industry in Europe. This list focuses on the Western European military block industry, and excludes Russia, Belarus and Serbia.

Some of the systems included have foreign participation, some others are 100% European. The main participants in the systems are mentioned.

== Turrets, gun pods, guns and rounds ==
=== Turrets, gun pods, guns and rounds in production ===
Model	Variant	Origin	Type	Used by	Notes
Turrets
Leonardo TM 197B With M197 Gatling gun	—	Italy	Gun turret for attack helicopter, 20×102mm	Agusta .129 Manusta, AW249 Fenice, T129 ATAK	
Nexter THL20 With M621 gun	—	France	Gun turret for attack helicopter, 20×102mm	HAL Prachand, HAL Rudra, IAR 330	
Nexter THL30 With 30M781 gun	—	France	Gun turret for attack helicopter, 30×113mmB	Eurocopter Tiger	
Gun pods
CC422	CC422 with DEFA 553	France	Gun pod with autocannon, 30×113mmB	Mirage 2000D	Recycled guns from Mirage F1.
FN HMP400 With FN M3P	—	Belgium	Gun pod, 12.7×99mm NATO	Eurocopter Tiger UHT, Airbus Helicopters HForce (Airbus H125M, Airbus H145M, Airbus H225M), HIL - H160M Guépard, Agusta A.129 Mangusta	
FN HMP250, With FN M3P	—	Belgium	Gun pod, 12.7×99mm NATO	Leonardo M-346F	
FN HMP230, With FN M3P	—	Belgium	Gun pod, 12.7×99mm NATO	—	
Pod NC 621	—	France	Gun pod with autocannon, 20×102mm	Leonardo M-346F, Airbus H225M, or Airbus Helicopters HForce (Airbus H125M, Airbus H145M, Airbus H225M), IAR 330	
Guns
FN M3P Browning	—	Belgium / USA	Heavy machine gun, 12.7×99mm NATO	—	New gun mount in production with the FN EMGS.
KNDS DEFA 30	DEFA 30M781	France	Autocannon, 30×113mmB	Eurocopter Tiger	
KNDS DEFA 30	DEFA 30M791B	France	Autocannon, 30×113mmB	Dassault Rafale	
KNDS M621	—	France	Autocannon, 20×102mm	Leonardo M-346F, Airbus H225M, or Airbus Helicopters HForce (Airbus H125M, Airbus H145M, Airbus H225M), HAL Prachand	
Mauser BK-27	—	Germany	Autocannon, 27×145mm	Alphajet A, Eurofighter Typhoon, Panavia Tornado, Saab JAS39 Gripen	

== Air-to-air missiles ==
=== Air-to-air missiles in production ===
Model	Variant	Origin	Type	Used by	Notes
Mistral	Mistral 3 ATAM	France	Very short-range, IR homing	Eurocopter Tiger, HAL Prachand, HAL Rudra, MAH Marineon	
ASRAAM	—	UK	Short-range, IR homing	Eurofighter Typhoon, Lockheed Martin F-35B, SEPECAT Jaguar	
IRIS-T	—	Germany / Greece / Italy / Norway / Spain / Sweden	Short-range, IR homing	Eurofighter Typhoon, Saab JAS39 Gripen, Panavia Tornado, Leonardo M-346F, F/A-18 Hornet, KAI T-50 Golden Eagle, KAI KF-21 Boromae, F-4 AUP, F-5M Super Tigris, F-16 Falcon	
MICA	MICA NG IR	France	Medium-range, IR homing, 2-way data link, lock-on before and after launch	Dassault Rafale, Mirage 2000	
MICA	MICA NG RF	France	Medium-range, terminal active AESA radar homing. 2-way data link, lock-on before and after launch	Dassault Rafale, Mirage 2000	
Meteor	—	UK / Germany / France / Italy / Spain / Sweden	BVR, INS, mid-course update by datalink, terminal active radar homing	Dassault Rafale, Eurofighter Typhoon, Saab JAS39 Gripen, KAI KF-21 Boromae (pending, Lockheed Martin F-35, GCAP, FCAS)	

=== Air-to-air missiles in development ===
Model	Variant	Origin	Type	Designed for	Notes
IRIS-T	IRIS-T AAM Block 2	Germany / Italy / Spain / Sweden	Short-range / IR guided / mid-course update by datalink	Eurofighter Typhoon / KAI KF-21 Boromae / Lockheed Martin F-16 / Saab JAS39 Gripen	
IRIS-T	IRIS-T FCAAM	Germany	Short-range / IR guided	FCAS	
Fulgur	—	Italy	MANPADS / Very short-range / IR guided	AW249 Fenice	
FSRM Future short-range air-to-air missile	—	Germany / Italy / Hungary / Spain / Sweden	Short-range	—	

== Air launched nuclear missiles ==
=== Air launched nuclear missile in production ===
Model	Variant	Origin	Type	Used by	Notes
ASMP Air-Sol Moyenne Portée	ASMPA-R	France	Supersonic cruise missile with nuclear warhead	Dassault Rafale	

=== Air launched nuclear missile in development ===
Model	Variant	Origin	Type	Designed for	Notes
ASN4G	—	France	Hypersonic cruise missile with nuclear warhead	FCAS	

== Air launched anti-ship missiles ==
=== Air launched anti-ship missiles in production ===
Model	Variant	Origin	Type	Used by	Notes
Sea Killer / Marte	Marte MK2/S	Italy	Fire-and-forget, AESA RF seeker, sea-skimmingl subsonic, anti-ship missile	AgustaWestland EH101, NHIndustries NH90 NFH (pending: EADS/CASA C-295 MPA)	
Sea Killer / Marte	Marte ER (naval, ground, and helicopter launched)	Italy	Fire-and-forget, AESA RF seeker, sea-skimmingl subsonic, anti-ship missile	NHIndustries NH90 NFH, Airbus H215M	
Kongsberg Penguin	Mk3	Norway	IR seeker, short-to-medium range, anti-ship guided missile	Bell 412SP, SH-2 Seasprite, SH-60 Seahaw, Westland Super Lynx, F-16 Falcon	
Naval Strike Missile	NSM AL Naval Strike Missile - Air Launched	Norway	Subsonic, low observable, anti-shipcruise missile	SH-60 Seahawk, (pending: NHIndustries NH90 NFH)	
MBDA Exocet	Exocet AM-39	France	Subsonic, anti-ship cruise missile	Dassault Mirage F1, Dassault Mirage 2000 (2000C / 2000EG / 2000-5), Dassault Rafale, Dassault Super-Étendard, Atlantique 2, Airbus H225M, Eurocopter AS 532SC Cougar, ASH-3D Sea Kings	
RBS-15	RBS 15F ER (Air-launched variant of RBS-15 Mk3)	Sweden / Germany	Subsonic, anti-ship cruise missile	Saab JAS39 Gripen C/D	

=== Air launched anti-ship missiles in development ===
Model	Variant	Origin	Type	Designed for	Notes
MBDA Italia Sea Killer / Marte	Marte ER (fast jet launched)	Italy	Fire-and-forget, AESA RF seeker, sea-skimmingl subsonic, anti-ship missile	EADS/CASA C-295 MPA, Eurofighter Typhoon, Leonardo M-346F, Sikorski MH-60R Seahawk	
MBDA Sea Venom / ANL	—	France / UK	IR seeker (2-ways data link), lightweight anti-ship missile	AgustaWestland AW159 Wildcat, Eurocopter AS565 Panther, HIL - H160M Guépard, NHIndustries NH90 NFH	

== Air-to-ground / surface missiles ==
=== Air-to-ground / surface missiles in production ===
Model	Variant	Origin	Type	Used by	Notes
Multirole missiles
Thales Martlet (LMM) Lightweight Multirole Missile	—	UK	Multirole, lightweight, short range, laser guided, anti-air, anti drone, anti-surface missile	AW159 Wildcat, Schiebel Camcopter S-100, BAE Fury, Thales Watchkeeper WK450, (pending: Jackal UAV)	
Joint Strike Missile	—	Norway / USA	Subsonic, ultra-low observable, anti-ship / land-attack cruise missile	F-15E Strike Eagle, F-16 Falcon, F/A-18 Super Hornet, Lockheed Martin F-35	
RBS-15	RBS 15 Mk4 Gungir	Sweden	Subsonic, anti-ship / land-attack cruise missile	Saab JAS39 Gripen E/F	
Air launched cruise missiles
Black Shaheen	—	France	Subsonic, low observable, land-attack cruise missile	Mirage 2000-9	
Diehl Spice	Spice 250 ER	Israel / Germany	Terrain mapping and GPS guidance, land-attack missile	Eurofighter Typhoon, Panavia Tornado, Leonardo M-346F, F-16 Falcon	
Storm Shadow / SCALP-EG	—	France / UK	Subsonic, low observable, land-attack cruise missile	Dassault Mirage 2000 (2000-5, 2000D), Dassault Rafale, Panavia Tornado, Eurofighter Typhoon, Sukhoi Su-24	
Taurus KEPD 350E	—	Germany / Sweden	Subsonic, low observable, land-attack cruise missile	Panavia Tornado, Eurofighter Typhoon, Saab JAS39 Gripen C/D/E/F, F/A-18 Hornet A/B	
Taurus KEPD 350	KEPD 350K	Design / production: Germany / Sweden; Licence: South Korea	Subsonic, low observable, land-attack cruise missile	F-15K Slam Eagle	
Anti-radiation missiles
AGM-88 HARM	AGM-88E	Design / production: USA; Licence: Germany	Anti-radiation missile	Panavia Tornado ECR, (pending: Eurofighter Typhoon ECR)	
AGM-88 HARM	AGM-88E2	Design / production: USA; Licence: Germany	Anti-radiation missile	Panavia Tornado ECR, (pending: Eurofighter Typhoon ECR)	
Medium-range air to ground missiles
AIM-9L Sidewinder	Diehl LaGS Laser Guided Sidewinder	Germany	IR homing, air-to-ground missile	Saab JAS39 Gripen C/D, F-16 Falcon	
MBDA Brimstone	—	UK	Dual semi-active laser and radar homing, tandem-shaped charge, tactical strike missile	Eurofighter Typhoon, Panavia Tornado FGR4, MQ-9B Protector RG Mk 1, Leonardo M-346F (pending: Eurodrone, KAI KF-21 Boramae and KAI T-50 Golden Eagle)	
Tactical air-to-ground weapons
MBDA Akeron MP	—	France / Switzerland	Anti-tank guided missile	ATLAS 8H Kerveros	
MBDA Enforcer	MBDA Enforcer Air	Germany	Anti-tank guided missile	Nauru 1000C	
PARS-3	PARS 3 LR	Germany	Anti-tank guided missile	Eurocopter Tiger	

=== Air-to-ground / surface missiles in development ===
Model	Variant	Origin	Type	Designed for	Notes
Multirole missiles
MBDA FC / ASW Future Cruise/Anti-Ship Weapon	TP15	France / Italy / UK	Subsonic, ultra-low observable, anti-ship / land-attack cruise missile	Dassault Rafale, Eurofighter Typhoon, (pending: GCAP, FCAS)	
MBDA FC / ASW Future Cruise/Anti-Ship Weapon	RJ10	France / Italy / UK	Supersonic (ramjet powered), highly manoeuvrable, anti-ship / land-attack cruise missile	Dassault Rafale, Eurofighter Typhoon, (pending: GCAP, FCAS)	
MBDA Deutschland RCM^{2} Remote Carrier Multidomain Multirole Effector	—	Germany / Spain	Universal cruise missile	Eurofighter Typhoon, (pending: FCAS)	
Air launched cruise missiles
MBDA SPEAR	—	UK	INS / GPS guidance after launch, Multi-mode seeker (two-way datalink; terminal radar homing, IR homing or laser guidance), land-attack cruise missile	Eurofighter Typhoon, Lockheed Martin F-35 (pending: GCAP)	
Taurus KEPD-350	Taurus Neo	Germany / Sweden	Subsonic, low observable, land-attack cruise missile	Panavia Tornado, Eurofighter Typhoon, Saab JAS39 Gripen C/D/E/F	
Taurus KEPD-350	KEPD 350K-2	Design / production: Germany / Sweden; Licence: South Korea	Subsonic, low observable, land-attack cruise missile	FA-50 Block 20	
Taurus KEPD-350	Long range	Design / production: Germany / Sweden; Licence: South Korea	Subsonic, low observable, land-attack cruise missile	KAI KF-21 Boramae	
Anti-radiation missiles
AASF	—	France	Anti-radiation missile	Dassault Rafale (pending: FCAS)	
Medium-range air to ground missiles
IRIS-T	IRIS-T ASM	Germany	IR homing, air-to-ground missile	Saab JAS39 Gripen C/D, F-16 Falcon	
Tactical air-to-ground weapons
MBDA Akeron LP	—	France / Switzerland	Anti-tank guided missile	Eurocopter Tiger, Eurodrone	
Diehl / Safran lightweight, modular air-to-ground munitions	—	Germany / France	Tactical missiles	—	
Diehl / Safran lightweight, modular air-to-ground munitions	—	Germany / France	Loitering munitions	—	

== Decoy ==
=== Decoy in development ===
Model	Variant	Origin	Type	Designed for	Notes
MBDA SPEAR	MBDA SPEAR EW	UK	Decoy / stand-in jammer	Eurofighter Typhoon, Lockheed Martin F-35 (pending: GCAP)	

== Bombs ==
=== Bombs in production ===
Model	Variant	Origin	Type	Used by	Notes
Bomb bodies
Rheinmetall Mk82	Mk82-EP	Germany / Italy / Poland	500 lb (230 kg), unguided, low-drag general-purpose bomb	Dassault Rafale, Dassault Mirage 2000D, Eurofighter Typhoon, Panavia Tornado, Saab JAS39 Gripen, F-16 Falcon	
MBDA PGM 500	—	UK	500 lb (230 kg), radar laser, TV, or infra-red seekers	Dassault Mirage 2000, Eurofighter Typhoon, Panavia Tornado. F-16 Falcon	
MBDA PGM 2000	—	UK	2,000 lb (910 kg), radar, laser, TV, or infra-red seekers	Dassault Mirage 2000, Eurofighter Typhoon, Panavia Tornado. F-16 Falcon	
MBDA BANG	BANG 125	France / Germany / Italy / UK	125 kg (276 lb), insensitive bomb with laser, INS/GPS, IR/INS/GPS guidance kits	Dassault Rafale, Eurofighter Typhoon (pending: GCAP, FCAS)	
MBDA BANG	BANG 250	France / Germany / Italy / UK	250 kg (550 lb), insensitive bomb with laser, INS/GPS, IR/INS/GPS guidance kits	Dassault Rafale, Eurofighter Typhoon (pending: GCAP, FCAS)	
Guidance kit / wings
Safran AASM HAMMER Armement Air-Sol Modulaire	—	France	Fire and forget bomb, INS and GPS guidance kit	Dassault Rafale, Dassault Mirage 2000D, Dassault Mirage F1, F-16 Falcon, HAL Tejas, MiG-29, Sukhoi Su-25 (pending: FCAS, Eurodrone, Aarok)	3 guidance kits for Mk 82
Safran AASM HAMMER Armement Air-Sol Modulaire	—	France	Fire and forget bomb, IR homing, INS and GPS guidance kit	Dassault Rafale, Dassault Mirage 2000D, Dassault Mirage F1, F-16 Falcon, HAL Tejas, MiG-29, Sukhoi Su-25 (pending: FCAS, Eurodrone, Aarok)	3 guidance kits for Mk 82
Safran AASM HAMMER Armement Air-Sol Modulaire	—	France	Fire and forget bomb, INS and GPS guidance and Laser guidance kit	Dassault Rafale, Dassault Mirage 2000D, Dassault Mirage F1, F-16 Falcon, HAL Tejas, MiG-29, Sukhoi Su-25 (pending: FCAS, Eurodrone, Aarok)	3 guidance kits for Mk 82
MBDA Diamond Back	SDB-1	Design: France / Germany / Italy / UK; Production: USA	Tandem-wing integrated with weapon guidance	Lockheed Martin F-22, Lockheed Martin F-35, Boeing B-52H, Rockwell B-1B, Northrop B-2	

=== Bombs in development ===
Model	Variant	Origin	Type	Designed for	Notes
MBDA SmartCruiser		France / Germany / Italy / UK	Guided glide bomb with range extending propulsion	Dassault Rafale, Eurofighter Typhoon (pending: GCAP, FCAS)	
MBDA SmartGlider	SmartGlider Light	France / Germany / Italy / UK; Collaboration: UAE	120 kg (260 lb), multi-mode guidance, high-blast / penetration glide bomb	Dassault Rafale, Eurofighter Typhoon (pending: GCAP, FCAS)	
MBDA SmartGlider	SmartGlider Heavy	France / Germany / Italy / UK; Collaboration: UAE	1,300 kg (2,900 lb), multi-mode guidance, high-blast / penetration glide bomb	Dassault Rafale, Eurofighter Typhoon (pending: GCAP, FCAS)	
MBDA BANG	BANG 1000	France / Germany / Italy / UK	1,000 kg (2,200 lb), insensitive bomb with laser, INS/GPS, IR/INS/GPS guidance kits	Dassault Rafale, Eurofighter Typhoon (pending: GCAP, FCAS)	
Safran AASM HAMMER Armement Air-Sol Modulaire	AASM XLR	France	Fire and forget bomb, INS and GPS guidance kit	Dassault Rafale, Dassault Mirage 2000D, Dassault Mirage F1, F-16 Falcon, HAL Tejas, MiG-29, Sukhoi Su-25 (pending: FCAS, Eurodrone, Aarok)	New variant in development.
Safran AASM HAMMER Armement Air-Sol Modulaire	AASM XLR	France	Fire and forget bomb, IR homing, INS and GPS guidance kit	Dassault Rafale, Dassault Mirage 2000D, Dassault Mirage F1, F-16 Falcon, HAL Tejas, MiG-29, Sukhoi Su-25 (pending: FCAS, Eurodrone, Aarok)	New variant in development.
Safran AASM HAMMER Armement Air-Sol Modulaire	AASM XLR	France	Fire and forget bomb, INS and GPS guidance and Laser guidance kit	Dassault Rafale, Dassault Mirage 2000D, Dassault Mirage F1, F-16 Falcon, HAL Tejas, MiG-29, Sukhoi Su-25 (pending: FCAS, Eurodrone, Aarok)	New variant in development.

== Rockets ==
=== Rockets in production ===
Model	Variant	Origin	Type	Used by	Notes
Aircraft rocket pods
Thales LAU 32	LAU 32 MOD 4	Belgium	Aircraft, 7-tube rocket pod for FFAR rockets	Aircraft: Jet fighters: F-16 Falcon, F/A-18 Hornet; Trainers / light attack: BAE Hawk, EMB314 Super Tucano, F-5 Tiger, T-6 Texan II, Leonardo M-346	
Thales LAU 32	LAU 32 MOD 5	Belgium	Aircraft, 7-tube rocket pod for FFAR and WA rockets	Aircraft: Jet fighters: F-16 Falcon, F/A-18 Hornet; Trainers / light attack: BAE Hawk, EMB314 Super Tucano, F-5 Tiger, T-6 Texan II, Leonardo M-346	
Thales LAU 51	LAU 51 MOD 4	Belgium	Aircraft, 19-tube rocket pod for FFAR rockets	Aircraft: Jet fighters: F-16 Falcon, F/A-18 Hornet; Trainers / light attack: BAE Hawk, EMB314 Super Tucano, F-5 Tiger, T-6 Texan II, Leonardo M-346	
Thales LAU 51	LAU 51 MOD 5	Belgium	Aircraft, 19-tube rocket pod for FFAR and WA rockets	Aircraft: Jet fighters: F-16 Falcon, F/A-18 Hornet; Trainers / light attack: BAE Hawk, EMB314 Super Tucano, F-5 Tiger, T-6 Texan II, Leonardo M-346	
Thales FZ800 Digital Smart Launcher	—	Belgium	Aircraft, 7-tube rocket pod for FFAR and WA rockets with LIU (Launcher Interface Unit), guided and unguided	—	
Thales FZ819 Digital Smart Launcher	—	Belgium	Aircraft, 19-tube rocket pod for FFAR and WA rockets with LIU (Launcher Interface Unit), guided and unguided	—	
TDA Armements Telson 12 JF Digital Rocket Launcher	—	France	Aircraft, 12-tube rocket pod	Dassault Mirage 2000, Dassault Rafale, T-6 Texan II	
Helicopter rocket pods
Thales FZ606 Digital Smart Launcher	—	Belgium	Helicopter, 6-tube rocket pod for FFAR and WA rocket, guided and unguided	Helicopters: AgustaWestland: A109 LUH, AW101, AW139, AW149, AW169; Airbus Helicopters: Airbus Helicopters HForce (Airbus H125M, Airbus H145M, Airbus H225M), Airbus H215M, AS565MBe Panther, Eurocopter EC635, Eurocopter Tiger; Denel: Denel Rooivalk; Hindustan Aeronautics Limited: HAL Rudra, HAL Prachand; McDonnell Douglas: MD530G	
Thales FZ220	—	Belgium	Helicopter, 7-tube rocket pod for FFAR and WA rockets	Helicopters: AgustaWestland: A109 LUH, AW101, AW139, AW149, AW169; Airbus Helicopters: Airbus Helicopters HForce (Airbus H125M, Airbus H145M, Airbus H225M), Airbus H215M, AS565MBe Panther, Eurocopter EC635, Eurocopter Tiger; Denel: Denel Rooivalk; Hindustan Aeronautics Limited: HAL Rudra, HAL Prachand; McDonnell Douglas: MD530G	
Thales FZ233	—	Belgium	Helicopter, 7-tube rocket pod for FFAR and WA rockets with LIU (Launcher Interface Unit)	Helicopters: AgustaWestland: A109 LUH, AW101, AW139, AW149, AW169; Airbus Helicopters: Airbus Helicopters HForce (Airbus H125M, Airbus H145M, Airbus H225M), Airbus H215M, AS565MBe Panther, Eurocopter EC635, Eurocopter Tiger; Denel: Denel Rooivalk; Hindustan Aeronautics Limited: HAL Rudra, HAL Prachand; McDonnell Douglas: MD530G	
Thales FZ219	—	Belgium	Helicopter, 12-tube rocket pod for FFAR and WA rockets	Helicopters: AgustaWestland: A109 LUH, AW101, AW139, AW149, AW169; Airbus Helicopters: Airbus Helicopters HForce (Airbus H125M, Airbus H145M, Airbus H225M), Airbus H215M, AS565MBe Panther, Eurocopter EC635, Eurocopter Tiger; Denel: Denel Rooivalk; Hindustan Aeronautics Limited: HAL Rudra, HAL Prachand; McDonnell Douglas: MD530G	
Thales FZ231	—	Belgium	Helicopter, 12-tube rocket pod for FFAR and WA rockets with LIU (Launcher Interface Unit)	Helicopters: AgustaWestland: A109 LUH, AW101, AW139, AW149, AW169; Airbus Helicopters: Airbus Helicopters HForce (Airbus H125M, Airbus H145M, Airbus H225M), Airbus H215M, AS565MBe Panther, Eurocopter EC635, Eurocopter Tiger; Denel: Denel Rooivalk; Hindustan Aeronautics Limited: HAL Rudra, HAL Prachand; McDonnell Douglas: MD530G	
Thales FZ225	—	Belgium	Helicopter, 19-tube rocket pod for FFAR and WA rockets	Helicopters: AgustaWestland: A109 LUH, AW101, AW139, AW149, AW169; Airbus Helicopters: Airbus Helicopters HForce (Airbus H125M, Airbus H145M, Airbus H225M), Airbus H215M, AS565MBe Panther, Eurocopter EC635, Eurocopter Tiger; Denel: Denel Rooivalk; Hindustan Aeronautics Limited: HAL Rudra, HAL Prachand; McDonnell Douglas: MD530G	
Thales FZ207	—	Belgium	Helicopter, 19-tube rocket pod for FFAR and WA rockets with LIU (Launcher Interface Unit)	Helicopters: AgustaWestland: A109 LUH, AW101, AW139, AW149, AW169; Airbus Helicopters: Airbus Helicopters HForce (Airbus H125M, Airbus H145M, Airbus H225M), Airbus H215M, AS565MBe Panther, Eurocopter EC635, Eurocopter Tiger; Denel: Denel Rooivalk; Hindustan Aeronautics Limited: HAL Rudra, HAL Prachand; McDonnell Douglas: MD530G	
TDA Armements Telson 8 Digital Rocket Launcher	—	France	Helicopter, 8-tube rocket pod	SA 342 Gazelle	
TDA Armements Telson 12 Digital Rocket Launcher	—	France	Helicopter, 12-tube rocket pod	Airbus Helicopters HForce (Airbus H125M, Airbus H145M, Airbus H225M), Airbus H215M, AS565MBe Panther, Eurocopter EC635, Eurocopter Tiger	
TDA Armements Telson 22 Digital Rocket Launcher	—	France	Helicopter, 22-tube rocket pod	Airbus Helicopters HForce (Airbus H125M, Airbus H145M, Airbus H225M), Airbus H215M, AS565MBe Panther, Eurocopter EC635, Eurocopter Tiger	
Drone rocket pods
Thales FZ602 Digital Smart Launcher	—	Belgium	Drone, 2-tube rocket pod for (and land vehicle / ship) to fire FFAR and WA rockets, guided and unguided	Sarisa II	
TDA Armements Telson 2 Digital Rocket Launcher	—	France	Helicopter, 2-tube rocket pod	UAV Tanan 300, Safran Patroller	
Guided rocket
Diehl GILA 70 mm Based on GATR	—	Germany / Israel	70 mm semi-active laser guided rocket	Eurocopter Tiger UHT, Airbus Helicopters HForce (Airbus H125M, Airbus H145M, Airbus H225M), NHIndustries NH90 NFH	JV with Elbit
Thales FZ275 LGR	—	Belgium / France	70 mm semi-active laser guided rocket	Eurocopter Tiger, Airbus Helicopters HForce (Airbus H125M, Airbus H145M, Airbus H225M)	Laser following Thales Scorpion helmet line of sight.
TDA Armements Acüleüs LG with CDE warhead (collateral damage effect)	—	France	68 mm, laser-guided rocket head	Eurocopter Tiger	
Rocket munitions
Thales FZ122	—	Belgium	70 mm warhead with 2,200 flechettes	—	
Thales FZ149	—	Belgium	70 mm multi-dart warhead	—	
Thales FZ236	—	Belgium	70 mm smoke warhead	—	
Thales FZ271 HE	—	Belgium	70 mm, high explosive warhead	—	
Thales FZ319 HEAP	—	Belgium	70 mm, high explosive armour piercing warhead	—	
Thales FZ181	—	Belgium	70 mm practice warhead with flash signature	—	
Thales FZ120	—	Belgium	70 mm inert practice for FZ181, FZ236, FZ71, FZ319	—	
TDA Armements Acüleüs P	—	France	68 mm, practice round	—	
TDA Armements Acüleüs P&M	—	France	68 mm, practice and marking round	—	
TDA Armements Acüleüs MD-36	—	France	68 mm, 36 darts against lightly armoured vehicles	—	
TDA Armements Acüleüs MD-432	—	France	68 mm, 432 darts against deployed troops and sensitive equipment	—	
TDA Armements Acüleüs HE-IMP	—	France	68 mm, high explosive on impact	—	
TDA Armements Acüleüs HE-MM	—	France	68 mm, high explosive with air-burst or impact capacity	—	
Rocket motors
Thales FZ67	—	Belgium	Fixed-wing aircraft - FFAR motor section (Folding Fins Aerial Rocket)	—	
Thales FZ68	—	Belgium	Helicopters - FFAR motor section (Folding Fins Aerial Rocket)	—	
Thales FZ90	—	Belgium	WA rocket motor section (Wrap Around)	—	
Thales FZ276	—	Belgium	FFAR rocket motor section for laser guided rockets (Folding Fins Aerial Rocket)	—	

=== Rockets in development ===
Model	Variant	Origin	Type	Designed for	Notes
Guided rocket
Thales Direct Fire and Beyond Line of Sight	—	France	68 mm BLOS rocket	Eurocopter Tiger	
Rocket munitions
Rheinmetall practice rockets	—	Germany / Belgium	70 mm training rocket	Eurocopter Tiger UHT, Airbus Helicopters HForce (Airbus H125M, Airbus H145M, Airbus H225M)	Collaboration with FZ for the development

== Air launched torpedoes ==
=== Air launched torpedoes in production ===
Model	Variant	Origin	Type	Used by	Notes
Sting Ray	Sting Ray Mod 1	UK	Acoustic homing lightweight ASW torpedo	Lockheed P-3C Orion, Boeing P-8 Poseidon, AgustaWestland AW101, AgustaWestland AW159, NHIndustries NH-90, IAR 330 Naval	
Sting Ray	Practice	UK	Training ASW torpedo	Boeing P-8 Poseidon, AgustaWestland AW101, AgustaWestland AW159	
MU90 Impact	—	Italy / France	Acoustic homing lightweight torpedo	Atlantique 2, AgustaWestland AW101, NHIndustries NH-90, SH-2G Super Seasprite, Mil Mi-14PL, Westland SeaLynx Mk88A (pending: A321Neo MPA, ATR-72 ASW, Alenia C-27J)	

=== Air launched torpedoes in development ===
Model	Variant	Origin	Type	Designed for	Notes
BAE Systems Sting Ray	Sting Ray Mod 2	UK	Acoustic homing lightweight torpedo	Boeing P-8 Poseidon (trials, T-600 heavy-lift UAS)	
Saab Torped 47 SLWT	—	Sweden	Acoustic homing lightweight torpedo	NHIndustries NH-90, Saab Swordfish	

== Air launched loitering munitions ==
=== Air launched loitering munitions in development ===
Model	Variant	Origin	Type	Designed for	Notes
Arquimea Q-SLAM-40	—	Spain	Loitering munition	NHIndustries NH-90	

== See also ==
- List of weapon systems in production and in development by the European defence industry
  - List of land weapon systems in production and in development by the European defence industry
    - Europeans tanks in production and in development
    - European indirect fire systems in production / development
    - European armoured vehicles in production and in development
  - List of naval weapon systems in production and in development by the European defence industry
    - European naval weapons in production and in development
  - List of aerial weapon systems in production and in development by the European defence industry
    - European military fixed wing aircraft in production and in development
    - European military rotorcraft in production and in development
    - List of military drones in production and in development by the European defence industry
    - European military aircraft mechanical systems in production and in development
    - List of military aircraft electronic systems in production and in development by the European defence industry
    - List of air defence systems and radars in production and in development by the European defence industry
    - List of aerospace defence companies in Europe
