= List of armoured vehicles in production and in development by the European defence industry =

This list of armoured vehicles in production and in development by the European defence industry aims at summarising the current status of the land defence industry in Europe. This list focuses on the Western European military block industry, and excludes Russia, Belarus and Serbia. The systems mentioned are at least partially European.

This page excludes European indirect fire systems in production / development and European tanks in production and in development which can be found on another page.

== Tracked vehicles ==
=== Heavy tracked vehicles ===
==== Heavy tracked vehicles in production ====
Base vehicle	Model	Manufacturer	Origin	Type	Clients	Notes
Recovery vehicles
Leopard 2	Bergepanzer 3 Büffel	Rheinmetall (KNDS DE base vehicle)	Germany	ARV (Armoured recovery vehicle)	Canada, Czechia, Germany, Greece, Hungary, Netherlands, Singapore, Spain, Sweden, Switzerland, Ukraine	
Leopard 2	WiSENT 2 ARV	FFG (Flensburger Fahrzeugbau GmbH) (KNDS DE base vehicle)	Germany	ARV (Armoured recovery vehicle)	Denmark, Hungary, Norway	
Engineering vehicles
Leopard 2	AEV 3 Kodiak	Rheinmetall RUAG (KNDS DE base vehicle)	Germany Switzerland	AEV (Armoured engineering vehicle)	Germany, Netherlands, Singapore, Sweden, Switzerland	
Leopard 2	WiSENT 2 AEV	FFG (Flensburger Fahrzeugbau GmbH) (KNDS DE base vehicle)	Germany	AEV (Armoured engineering vehicle)	Canada, Denmark, Norway, Qatar, UAE	
Mine flails
Leopard 2	Keiler NG	Rheinmetall (KNDS DE base vehicle)	Germany	ABV (Armoured breaching vehicle)	—	
Leopard 2	WiSENT 2 MC	FFG (Flensburger Fahrzeugbau GmbH) (KNDS DE base vehicle)	Germany	MCV (Mine clearing vehicle)	—	
Bridge layers
Leopard 2	Leguan bridge layer	KNDS DE	Germany	AVLB (Armoured vehicle-launched bridge)	Denmark, Finland, Germany, Netherlands, Norway, Singapore, Sweden, Switzerland	

==== Heavy tracked vehicles in development ====
Base vehicle	Model	Manufacturer	Origin	Type	Equipment	Clients	Notes
Recovery vehicles
KF-51 Panther	KF51 ARV	Leonardo Rheinmetall Military Vehicles (LRMV)	Germany Italy	ARV (Armoured recovery vehicle)	—	Italy	In development for the Italian Army, 140 support tanks planned.
Engineering vehicles
KF-51 Panther	KF51 AEV	Leonardo Rheinmetall Military Vehicles (LRMV)	Germany Italy	AEV (Armoured engineering vehicle)	—	Italy	In development for the Italian Army, 140 support tanks planned.
Bridge layers
KF-51 Panther	KF51 AVLB	Leonardo Rheinmetall Military Vehicles (LRMV)	Germany Italy	AVLB (Armoured vehicle-launched bridge)	—	Italy	In development for the Italian Army, 140 support tanks planned.
Air defence
Leopard 1	Condor	FFG (Flensburger Fahrzeugbau GmbH) EVPÚ (KNDS DE base vehicle)	Germany Slovakia	SPAAG / C-UAS (Self-propelled anti-air gun / counter-unmanned aerial system)	Turra 30-SA turret GTS-30/N autocannon	—	
Leopard 1	Skyranger 35	Rheinmetall Air Defence (KNDS DE base vehicle)	Germany Switzerland	SPAAG / C-UAS (Self-propelled anti-air gun / counter-unmanned aerial system)	Skyranger 35 turret Oerlikon KDG autocanon	—	
Leopard 2	Skyranger 35	Rheinmetall Air Defence (KNDS DE base vehicle)	Germany Switzerland	SPAAG / C-UAS (Self-propelled anti-air gun / counter-unmanned aerial system)	Skyranger 35 turret GTS-30/N autocannon	—	

=== Medium tracked vehicles ===
==== Medium tracked vehicles in development ====
Base vehicle	Model	Manufacturer	Origin	Type	Equipment	Clients	Notes
Armoured fighting vehicles
KF31 Lynx	—	Rheinmetall	Germany	AFV (Armoured fighting vehicle)	—	—	38-tons variant.
Boxer - Tracked Mk.1	—	KNDS Deutschland	Germany	AFV (Armoured fighting vehicle)	—	—	Can use all mission modules of the GTK Boxer.
VAC Vehículo de Apoyo de Cadenas	VAC DCC Defensa contracarro	TESS Defence (GDELS SBS , EM&E, Indra, and SAPA)	Spain	Tank destroyer	Anti-tank guided missile to be defined	Spain	Derived from the ASCOD 2 base, successor of the M113.
Armoured personnel carrier
VAC Vehículo de Apoyo de Cadenas	VAC PP Portapersonal	TESS Defence (GDELS SBS , EM&E, Indra, and SAPA)	Spain	APC (Armoured personnel carrier)	—	Spain	Derived from the ASCOD 2 base, successor of the M113.
Command vehicles
VAC Vehículo de Apoyo de Cadenas	VAC PC Puesto de mando	TESS Defence (GDELS SBS , EM&E, Indra, and SAPA)	Spain	Command post vehicle	—	Spain	Derived from the ASCOD 2 base, successor of the M113.
VAC Vehículo de Apoyo de Cadenas	VAC OAV Observador avanzado	TESS Defence (GDELS SBS , EM&E, Indra, and SAPA)	Spain	Forward artillery observer	—	Spain	Derived from the ASCOD 2 base, successor of the M113.
Medical evacuation vehicles
VAC Vehículo de Apoyo de Cadenas	VAC AMB Ambulancia	TESS Defence (GDELS SBS , EM&E, Indra, and SAPA)	Spain	Armoured ambulance	—	Spain	Derived from the ASCOD 2 base, successor of the M113.
Logistics vehicles
VAC Vehículo de Apoyo de Cadenas	VAC CB Carga blindada	TESS Defence (GDELS SBS , EM&E, Indra, and SAPA)	Spain	Armoured cargo transport vehicle	—	Spain	Derived from the ASCOD 2 base, successor of the M548.
VAC Vehículo de Apoyo de Cadenas	VAC CPU Carga pick-up	TESS Defence (GDELS SBS , EM&E, Indra, and SAPA)	Spain	Pick-up transport vehicle	—	Spain	Derived from the ASCOD 2 base, successor of the M548.
Recovery vehicles
VAC Vehículo de Apoyo de Cadenas	VAC REC Recuperación	TESS Defence (GDELS SBS , EM&E, Indra, and SAPA)	Spain	ARV (Armoured recovery vehicle)	—	Spain	Derived from the ASCOD 2 base, successor of the M113.

=== Light tracked vehicles ===
==== Light tracked vehicles in production ====
Model	Manufacturer	Origin	Type	Clients	Notes
Multirole vehicle
BvS 10 Bandvagn Skyddad 10	BAE Systems AB	Sweden	Multi-role amphibious tracked articulated vehicle	Austria, France, Germany, Netherlands, Sweden, Ukraine, United Kingdom	
Bronco 3 ATTC Bronco All Terrain Tracked Carrier	ST Kinetics Leonardo (licence producer)	Singapore Italy	Multi-role amphibious tracked articulated vehicle	—	Licence made in Italy.
Sisu GTT Bronco All Terrain Tracked Carrier	ST Kinetics Sisu (licence producer)	Singapore Finland	Multi-role amphibious tracked articulated vehicle	—	Licence made in Finland.

==== Light tracked vehicles in development ====
Model	Manufacturer	Origin	Type	Equipment	Clients	Notes
Weapon carrier
GSD LuWa Luftbeweglicher Waffenträger	FFG (Flensburger Fahrzeugbau Gesellschaft mbH) ACS (ACS Armoured Car Systems) Valhalla Turrets	Germany Austria Slovenia	Airborne armoured fighting vehicle (weapon carrier)	Valhalla turret with a Mauser BK-27, or MELLS (Spike LR)	—	
Multirole vehicle
Patria TRACKX	Patria	Finland	Multirole armoured fighting vehicle	—	—	

== See also ==
- List of weapon systems in production and in development by the European defence industry
  - List of land weapon systems in production and in development by the European defence industry
    - European indirect fire systems in production / development
    - European tanks in production and in development
  - List of naval weapon systems in production and in development by the European defence industry
    - European naval weapons in production and in development
  - List of aerial weapon systems in production and in development by the European defence industry
    - European military fixed wing aircraft in production / development
    - European military rotorcraft in production / development
    - List of military drones in production and in development by the European defence industry
    - European military aircraft mechanical systems in production / development
    - List of military aircraft electronic systems in production and in development by the European defence industry
    - European aircraft weapons in production / development
    - List of air defence systems and radars in production and in development by the European defence industry
    - List of aerospace defence companies in Europe
