= List of military aircraft mechanical systems in production and in development by the European defence industry =

This list of military aircraft mechanical systems in production and in development by the European defence industry aims at summarising the current status of the aerospace defence industry in Europe. This list focuses on the Western European military block industry, and excludes Russia, Belarus and Serbia.

Some of the systems included have foreign participation, some others are 100% European. The main participants in the systems are mentioned.

== Aircraft engines ==
=== Aircraft engines and engine parts in production ===
Model	Variant	Type	Origin	Used by	Notes
Jet fighter engines
Eurojet EJ200	Mk 101	Turbofan engine	UK / Germany / Italy / Spain	Eurofighter Typhoon, Airbus Wingman	
Safran M88	—	Turbofan engine	France	Dassault Rafale	
Turbofan aircraft engines
CFM International CFM56	5B3 or 5B3/P or 5B3/2P	Turbofan engine	France / USA	Airbus A319CJ, Airbus A321-200, Airbus A321-211 Netra Mk2, Boeing E-3D Sentry, Boeing E-6 Mercury. Boeing E-7 Wedgetail, Boeing P-8 Poseidon, Boeing C-40 Clipper, Boeing KC-135R Stratotanker, Boeing RC-135, Boeing WC-135	
CFM LEAP	LEAP-1A	Turbofan engine	France / USA	Airbus A321 Neo LR, Airbus A321 Neo XLR MPA	
International Aero Engines V2500	—	Turbofan engine	Switzerland / Germany / Japan / UK / USA	Embraer KC-390, Airbus A319CJ, Airbus A319OH, Airbus A321-200	
Ivchenko Progress AI-25	—	Turbofan engine	Ukraine	Bayraktar Kızılelma, Hongdu JL-8	
Ivchenko-Progress AI-322	—	Turbofan engine	Ukraine	Bayraktar Kızılelma, Hongdu L-15, TAI Anka-3	
Ivchenko Progress D-436	—	Turbofan engine	Ukraine	Antonov An-178, Beriev Be-200	
Rolls-Royce BR710	—	Turbofan engine	Germany / UK	Bombardier Global 5000 (ELTA SIGINT India, VIP transport); Bombardier Global 6000 (electronic warfare (Pakistan and Turkey), Hensoldt Pegasus, Northrop E-11A, Project Dolphin ELINT UAE, Saab GlobalEye, Saab Swordfish, VIP transport), Bombardier Global 6500 (SNC HADES); Gulfstream V (C-37A - VIP transport); Gulfstream G550 (C-37B - VIP transport, E-550A / G550 CAEW, L3Harris EA-37B Compass Call, MC-55A Peregrine - SIGINT / ELINT)	
Rolls-Royce BR725	F130	Turbofan engine	Germany / UK / USA	Boeing B-52J	
Rolls-Royce Trent 700	—	Turbofan engine	UK	Airbus A330-200 MRTT	
Rolls-Royce Trent 7000	—	Turbofan engine	UK	Airbus A330-800 Neo MRTT+	
Rolls-Royce Trent XWB	Trent XWB-84	Turbofan engine	UK	Airbus ACJ350-900	
Turboprop aircraft engines
Eurotrop TP400 D6	—	Turboprop engine	UK / France / Germany / Spain	Airbus A400M Atlas	
Ivchenko AI-20	WJ-6	Turboprop engine	Ukraine / China	AVIC AG600, Shaanxy Y-8,	
Rolls-Royce AE 2100	AE 2100D2A	Turboprop engine	UK / USA	Alenia C-27J Spartan	
Rolls-Royce AE 2100	AE 2100D3	Turboprop engine	UK / USA	Lockheed Martin C-130J Super Hercules	
Rolls-Royce AE 2100	AE 2100J	Turboprop engine	UK / USA	ShinMaywa US-2.	
Rolls-Royce AE 2100	AE 2100P	Turboprop engine	UK / USA	Saab 2000 AEW&C	
Propfan aircraft engines
Ivchenko Progress D-27	D-27	Propfan engine	Ukraine	Antonov An-70	
Small aircraft / MALE drone engines
Austro Engine E4	—	Jet fuel piston engine (Inline-4)	Austria	Diamond DA40NG, Diamond DA42, DRDO Archer NG	
Hirth Motors 4102	—	Diesel cycle engines	Germany	EMT Luna UAV	
Hirth Motors 4201 EFI	—	Gasoline engine	Germany	MartinUAV V-BAT	
Ivchenko Progress AI-450	AI-450S	Turboprop engine	Ukraine	Baykar Bayraktar TB2, Diamond Dart 450	
Ivchenko Progress AI-450	AI-450T	Turboprop engine	Ukraine	Baykar Bayraktar Akıncı	
Rotax 912	—	Jet fuel piston engine (Flat-four, 4-stroke)	Austria	Baykar Bayraktar TB2, Diamond DA20 Katana, General Atomics Altus, General Atomics Gnat, Pipistrel Virus, Technam P2006T MRI	
Rotax 914	—	Turbocharged jet fuel piston engine (Flat-four, 4-stroke)	Austria	CAIG Wing Loong, Denel Dynamics Bateleur, EADS Harfang, General Atomics MQ-1Predator, IAI Heron, Pipistrel Virus	
Rotax 916	—	Jet fuel piston engine (Flat-four, 4-stroke)	Austria	Atobá XR, Elbit Hermes 900	
Safran Ardiden	Ardiden 3TP	Turboprop engine for drones	France / Germany (gearbox and propeller)	Turgis et Gaillard Aarok	
Thielert Centurion	—	Diesel cycle aircraft engines	Germany	Cirrus SR-22, Diamond DA40, Diamond DA42 Twin Star, General Atomics MQ-1C Gray Eagle, TAI Anka	
Walter H Series	H75-100	Turboprop engine	Czech Republic / USA	Diamond Dart 550, Dornier Do 28,	
Walter H Series	H80-200	Turboprop engine	Czech Republic / USA	Let L-410 Turbolet	
3W International	—	2-stroke engine	Germany / Netherlands	Boeing Insitu MQ-27 ScanEagle	
Helicopter engines
Ivchenko Progress D-27	D-127	Turboshaft engine	Ukraine	Mil Mi-26M	
Motor Sich MS-500V	—	Turboshaft engine	Ukraine	PZL W-3	
Motor Sich TV3-117	—	Turboshaft engine	Ukraine	TAI T929 ATAK 2	
MTR390	MTR390-2C	Turboshaft engine	France / Germany / Spain / UK	Eurocopter EC665 Tiger (HAP, ARH, UHT)	
MTR390	MTR390-E	Turboshaft engine	France / Germany / Spain / UK	Eurocopter EC665 Tiger (HAD)	
Rolls-Royce Turbomeca RTM322	—	Turboshaft engine	France / UK	AgustaWestland Apache, AgustaWestland AW101, NH Industries NH90	
Safran Aneto	Aneto-1K	Turboshaft engine	France	Leonardo AW149	
Safran Aneto	Aneto-1H	Turboshaft engine	France	IMRH (Indian Multi Role Helicopter), DBMRH (Deck Based Multi Role Helicopter)	
Safran Arrano	Arrano 1A	Turboshaft engine	France	HIL - H160M Guépard	
Safran Ardiden	Ardiden 3G	Turboshaft engine	France	Kamov Ka-60	
Safran Ardiden / HAL / Turbomeca Shakti	Ardiden 1H	Turboshaft engine	France / India (under licence)	HAL Dhruv, HAL Rudra,	
Safran Ardiden / HAL / Turbomeca Shakti	Ardiden 1H1	Turboshaft engine	France / India (under licence)	HAL Prachand	
Safran Ardiden / HAL / Turbomeca Shakti	Ardiden 1U	Turboshaft engine	France / India (under licence)	HAL Light Utility Helicopter	
Safran Arriel	Arriel 1E2	Turboshaft engine	France	MBB BK117C, Eurocopter EC145, UH-72 Lakota	
Safran Arriel	Arriel 2C2-CG	Turboshaft engine	France	Airbus H155, Eurocopter AS365N3+ Dauphin, Eurocopter AS565 Panther, Eurocopter MH-65 Dolphin	
Safran Arriel	Arriel 2D	Turboshaft engine	France	Airbus H125, Airbus H130	
Safran Arriel	Arriel 2E	Turboshaft engine	France	Airbus H145M, UH-72 Lakota	
Safran Arriel	Arriel 2K	Turboshaft engine	France	Leonardo Proteus	
Safran Arriel	Arriel 2N	Turboshaft engine	France	Airbus AS565 Mbe Panther	
Safran Arriel	Arriel 2S2	Turboshaft engine	France	Sikorsky S-76	
Safran Arriel	HAS-Arriel 2L2	Turboshaft engine	France / South Korea	KAI LAH	
Safran Arriel	Liming WZ-8A (Arriel 2C / 2C2)	Turboshaft engine	France / China (under licence)	Harbin Z-9	
Safran Arriel	Liming WZ-8C (Arriel 2C / 2C2)	Turboshaft engine	France / China (under licence)	Harbin Z-19	
Turbomeca Arrius	Arrius 2B2 / 2B2Plus	Turboshaft engine	France	Airbus H135 / EC635	
Turbomeca Arrius	Arrius 2K2	Turboshaft engine	France	Leonardo AW109	
Turbomeca Arrius	Arrius 2R	Turboshaft engine	France	Bell 505	
Turbomeca Makila	Makila 1A1	Turboshaft engine	France	Airbus H215M Cougar	
Turbomeca Makila	Makila 1A2	Turboshaft engine	France	Airbus H215 Super Puma	
Turbomeca Makila	Makila 2A1	Turboshaft engine	France	Airbus H225M	
Turbomeca Makila	Makila 1K2	Turboshaft engine	France	Denel Rooivalk	
Turbomeca Turmo	WZ-6C	Turboshaft engine	France / China (under licence)	Changhe Z-8G Changhe Z-18	
Helicopter drones engines
Austro Engine AE50R	—	Wankel engine	United States / Austria	Schiebel Camcopter S-100	
Hirth Motors 3503	—	Diesel cycle engines	Germany	UMS Skeldar V-200	
Thielert Centurion	—	Diesel cycle engines	Germany	Airbus Helicopters VSR700	

=== Aircraft engines and engine parts in development ===
Model	Variant	Type	Origin	Designed for	Notes
Jet fighter engines
GCAP engine	—	Turbofan engine (variable cycle engine)	Italy / Japan / UK	GCAP	
Safran M88	T-REX	Turbofan engine	France	Dassault Rafale F5	
NGFE (New Generation Fighter Engine, with Safran, MTU Aero Engines, ITP Aero)	—	Turbofan engine (variable cycle engine)	France / Germany / Spain	SCAF	
Wingman Engine (with Rolls-Royce Deutschland and ITP Aero)	—	Turbofan engine	Germany / Spain	Wingman concept	
Turbofan aircraft engines
Rolls Royce UltraFan	—	Geared turbofan engine	UK	Airliners (that will be eventually used militarily)	
Turboprop aircraft engines
Avio Catalyst	—	Turboprop engine	Italy / Germany / Poland / Czechia	Eurodrone	
Propfan aircraft engines
CFM International RISE	—	Propfan	France / USA	Airliners (that will be eventually used militarily)	
Small aircraft / MALE drone engines
PBS Aerospace TJ200	—	Turbofan engine	Czech Republic	Drones (and missiles)	
Helicopter engines
EURA (EUropean Military Rotorcraft Engine Alliance, with Safran / MTU Aero Engines)	—	Turboshaft engine	France / Germany	NATO NGRC (NATO Next Generation Rotorcraft Capability)	
Novel Powerplant Study (Avio Aero / GE Aerospace)	—	Turboshaft engine	Italy / USA	NATO NGRC (NATO Next Generation Rotorcraft Capability)	
ENGHE (European Next Generation Helicopter Engine, with Safran / MTU Aero Engines and Avio Aero)	—	Turboshaft engine	France / Germany / Italy	—	
Safran Arriel successor	—	Turboshaft engine	France	—	

== Engine parts and propellers ==
=== Engine parts and propellers in production ===
Model	Variants	Parts	Engine type	Origin of the part	Supplier	Used by	Notes
Parts for jet fighter engines
General Electric F110	F110-GE-129	Turbine disks (production)	Turbofan engine	Germany	MTU	F-16 Fighting Falcon (Block 50/52 and 70/72), F-15E Strike Eagle (F-15K, F-15SG, F-15SA, F-15QA), Boeing F-15EX Eagle II, Mitsubishi F-2,	
General Electric F110	F110-GE-129	—	Turbofan engine	France	Safran	F-16 Fighting Falcon (Block 50/52 and 70/72), F-15E Strike Eagle (F-15K, F-15SG, F-15SA, F-15QA), Boeing F-15EX Eagle II, Mitsubishi F-2,	
General Electric F110	F110-GE-129	—	Turbofan engine	Sweden	GKN Aero	F-16 Fighting Falcon (Block 50/52 and 70/72), F-15E Strike Eagle (F-15K, F-15SG, F-15SA, F-15QA), Boeing F-15EX Eagle II, Mitsubishi F-2,	
General Electric F414	—	Production of parts for the high and the low-pressure turbine	Turbofan engine	Germany	MTU	Boeing F/A-18E/F Super Hornet, Boeing EA-18G Growler. HAL Tejas Mk2, KAI KF-21 Boramae, Saab JAS 39E/F Gripen	
General Electric F414	—	Structural and rotating components in the engine's fan and compressor area	Turbofan engine	Sweden	GKN Aero	Boeing F/A-18E/F Super Hornet, Boeing EA-18G Growler. HAL Tejas Mk2, KAI KF-21 Boramae, Saab JAS 39E/F Gripen	
Pratt & Whitney F135	—	Rolls-Royce LiftSystem	STOVL turbofan engine	UK	Rolls-Royce	F-35 Lightning II - F-35B	
Pratt & Whitney Canada PW300	—	Lw-pressure turbine and casing (development and production)	Turbofan engine	Germany	MTU	Dassault Falcon 7X (VIP transport), Dassault Falcon 8X (VIP Transport, Archange - SIGINT and electronic warfare)	
Pratt & Whitney PW2000	F-117	Low-pressure turbine and turbine exhaust casing (development); low-pressure turbine parts, turbine exit case, high-pressure turbine and high-pressure compressor parts, diffuser/combustion chamber module components (production)	Turbofan engine	Germany	MTU	Boeing C-17 Globemaster III	
Pratt & Whitney PW2000	F-117	—	Turbofan engine	Sweden	GKN Aero	Boeing C-17 Globemaster III	
Parts for turboprop aircraft engines
Allison T56	—	NP2000 propeller	Turboprop engine	France	Ratier Figeac	Grumman E-2 Hawkeye (E-2C, E-2D, Lockheed C-130 Hercules, Lockheed KC-130 (KC-130T, KC-130R), Lockheed CP-140 Aurora	
Eurotrop TP400 D6	—	FH385/FH386 variable pitch propellers (contra-rotating)	Turboprop engine	France	Ratier Figeac	Airbus A400M	
Rolls-Royce AE 2100	—	R414 propeller	Turboprop engine	UK	Dowty	Alenia C-27J Spartan, Lockheed Martin C-130J Super Hercules, ShinMaywa US-2, Saab 2000 AEW&C	
Parts for small aircraft / MALE drone engines
Austro Engine E4	—	MTV-6, 3 blades propeller	Jet fuel piston engine (Inline-4)	Germany	MT propeller	Diamond DA40, Diamond DA42	
Continental IO-550	—	MTV-14, 4 blades propeller	Piston engine	Germany	MT propeller	Cirrus SR22, SR22T	
Honeywell TPE331	TPE331-10	MTV-27, 5-blades propeller	Turboprop engine	Germany	MT propeller	Dornier / RUAG 228 NG	
Ivchenko-Progress AI-450	AI-450S	5-blades propeller	Turboprop engine	Germany	MT propeller	Baykar Bayraktar TB2, Diamond Dart 450	
Rotax 912	912S3	MTV-21, 2-blades propeller	Jet fuel piston engine (Flat-four, 4-stroke)	Germany	MT propeller	Technam P2006T MRI	
Rotax 912	912 ULS	MTV-33, 2-blades propeller	Jet fuel piston engine (Flat-four, 4-stroke)	Germany	MT propeller	Pipistrel Virus	
Walter H Series	H75-100	5-blades propeller	Turboprop engine	Germany	MT propeller	Diamond Dart 550	
Walter H Series	H80-200	AV-725, 5-blades propeller	Turboprop engine	Czech Republic	Avia	Let L-410 Turbolet	
Parts for helicopter engines
General Electric GE38	T408	Power turbine (design and production)	Turboshaft engine	Germany	MTU	Sikorsky CH-53K King Stallions	

=== Engine parts and propellers in development ===
Model	Variants	Parts	Engine type	Origin	Supplier	Designed for	Notes
Jet fighter engines
NGFE (New Generation Fighter Engine)	—	Engine design and integration, design and production of the hot parts	Turbofan engine (variable cycle engine)	France	Safran	SCAF	
NGFE (New Generation Fighter Engine)	—	High-pressure and low-pressure compressors and the compressor intermediate case as well as for parts of the control systems	Turbofan engine (variable cycle engine)	Germany	MTU	SCAF	
NGFE (New Generation Fighter Engine)	—	Low-pressure turbine and the thrust nozzle	Turbofan engine (variable cycle engine)	Spain	ITP Aero	SCAF	
Parts for turbofan aircraft engines
Rolls Royce UltraFan	—	Gearbox	Geared turbofan engine	UK / Germany	Liebherr-Aerospace / Rolls-Royce Deutschland	Airliners (that will be eventually used militarily)	
Parts for turboprop aircraft engines
Avio Catalyst	—	6-bladed propeller	Turboprop engine	Italy / Germany	MT Propeller	Eurodrone	

== Fuel and refuelling systems ==
=== Fuel and refuelling systems in production ===
Model	Variant	Type	Origin	Used by	Notes
Refuelling boom
ARBS Airbus Military Aerial Refuelling Boom System	—	Refuelling boom	Germany,France, Spain	Airbus A330 MRTT, Airbus A330neo MRTT+	
Refuelling pods with drogue for tankers
Cobham 805E FRU Fuselage Refueling Unit	—	Under-fuselage refuelling pod	United Kingdom	Airbus A330 MRTT and Airbus A330neo MRTT+ (1 × central drogue), EADS CASA C-295	
Cobham 808E HDU Hose Drum Unit	—	Under-fuselage refuelling pod (for aircraft)	United Kingdom	Airbus A400M (1 × central drogue)	
Cobham 905E	—	Under-wing refuelling pod	United Kingdom	Airbus A330 MRTT and Airbus A330neo MRTT+ (2 × pods)	
Cobham 908E WDE	—	Under-wing refuelling pod (for aircraft and helicopters)	United Kingdom	Airbus A400M (2 × pods)	
Cobham 912E	—	Under-wing refuelling pod (for aircraft and helicopters)	United Kingdom	Embraer KC-390 (2 × pods)	
Cobham Mk.32B	—	Under-fuselage rand under wings efuelling pod (for aircraft)	United Kingdom	Ilyushin Il-78MKI (3 × pods)	
Cobham Series 48 AR Pod System		Under-wing refuelling pod (for aircraft and helicopters)	United Kingdom	KC-130J Super Hercules (2 × pods)	
Cobham WARP	—	Under-wing refuelling pod	United Kingdom	Boeing KC-46A Pegasus	
Buddy-buddy refuelling pods with drogue for jet-fighters
Cobham 31-301	—	Buddy under-fuselage refueling pods	United Kingdom	A-4 Skyhawk, A-6 Intruder, A-7 Corsair II, F/A-18 Hornet, F/A-18 Super Hornet, MQ-25 Stingray, S-3A/B Viking	
Cobham 754	—	Buddy refueling pods	United Kingdom	Sukhoi Su-30MKA, Sukhoi Su-30MKI	
Cobham FR300 HDU Hose Drum Unit	—	Buddy refueling pods	United Kingdom	Bell Boeing MV-22B Osprey	
Safran NARANG	—	Buddy under-fuselage refueling pods	France	Dassault Rafale	
Safran N220B	—	Buddy under-fuselage refueling pods	France	Dassault Rafale	
Refuelling probes for jet fighters
Cobham / Safran fixed refuelling probe	—	Fixed refuelling probe	France / United Kingdom	Dassault Rafale, Dassault Mirage 2000	
Cobham fixed refuelling probe	—	Fixed refuelling probe	United Kingdom	Dassault Rafale, HAL Tejas Mk1	
Cobham retractable refuelling probe (before Smiths Aerospace)	—	Retractable refuelling probe	United Kingdom	F-35 Lightning II (F-35B, F-35C)	
Cobham telescopic retractable refuelling probe	—	Telescopic retractable refuelling probe	United Kingdom	KAI FA-50, Saab JAS 39 Gripen	
GE Aerospace UK retractable refuelling probe (before Smiths Aerospace)	—	Telescopic refuelling probe	United Kingdom	Eurofighter Typhoon, Panavia Tornado, F/A-18 Super Hornet, Northrop Grumman X-47B	
Refuelling probes for other fixed-wing aircraft
GE Aerospace UK refuelling probe (before Smiths Aerospace)	—	Refuelling probe	United Kingdom	Airbus A400M	
Refuelling probes for rotary wing aircraft
Cobham fixed refuelling probe	—	Fixed refuelling probe	United Kingdom	Bell Boeing MV-22B Osprey	
Cobham removable refuelling probe	—	Removable refuelling probe	United Kingdom	AgustaWestland AW101, Airbus H225M Caracal	
Additional internal fuel tanks
Cobham AFFT Auxiliary Fuselage Fuel Tank	—	Additional internal duel tanks for tanker	United Kingdom	Embraer KC-390	
Cobham BFT Body Fuel Tanks	—	Additional internal duel tanks for tanker	United Kingdom	Boeing KC-46A Pegasus	
External fuel tanks - jet fighters
GE Aerospace UK (1,000 litres)	—	Drop tank	United Kingdom	Eurofighter Typhoon	
RPL 541/542 (2,000 litres)	—	Drop tank	France	Dassault Mirage 2000	
Aresia RPL-701 (1,250 litres)	—	Drop tank	France	Dassault Rafale	
Aresia RPL-741 (2,000 litres)	—	Drop tank	France	Dassault Rafale	

=== Fuel and refuelling systems in development ===
Model	Variant	Type	Origin	Designed for	Notes
Airbus Removable Refueling Boom	—	Refuelling boom	Germany	Airbus A330 MRTT, Airbus A330neo MRTT+	

== See also ==
- List of weapon systems in production and in development by the European defence industry
  - List of land weapon systems in production and in development by the European defence industry
    - European tanks in production and in development
    - European indirect fire systems in production and in development
    - European armoured vehicles in production and in development
  - List of naval weapon systems in production and in development by the European defence industry
    - European naval weapons in production and in development
  - List of aerial weapon systems in production and in development by the European defence industry
    - European military fixed wing aircraft in production and in development
    - European military rotorcraft in production and in development
    - List of military drones in production and in development by the European defence industry
    - List of military aircraft electronic systems in production and in development by the European defence industry
    - European aircraft weapons in production and in development
    - List of air defence systems and radars in production and in development by the European defence industry
    - List of aerospace defence companies in Europe
