= List of indirect fire systems in production and in development by the European defence industry =

This list of indirect fire systems in production and in development by the European defence industry aims at summarising the current status of the land defence industry in Europe. This list focuses on the Western European military block industry, and excludes Russia, Belarus and Serbia.

Some of the systems included have foreign participation, some others are 100% European. The main participants in the systems are mentioned.

== Howitzers ==
=== Self-propelled howitzers ===
==== Self-propelled howitzers in production ====
Model	Variant	Manufacturer	Origin	Base vehicle	Vehicle type	Calibre	Notes
Tracked howitzers
AHS Krab	—	Huta Stalowa Wola	Poland	K9 Thunder chassis	Tracked howitzer	155 mm L/52	
PzH 2000	—	KNDS Deutschland Rheinmetall	Germany	—	Tracked howitzer	155 mm L/52	
Wheeled howitzers
2S22 Bohdana	2S22 Bohdana 1.0	Kramatorsk Heavy Duty Machine Tool Plant	Ukraine	KrAZ-6322	6×6 truck	155 mm L/52	
2S22 Bohdana	2S22 Bohdana 2.0	Kramatorsk Heavy Duty Machine Tool Plant	Ukraine	MAZ-6317	6×6 truck	155 mm L/52	
2S22 Bohdana	2S22 Bohdana 3.0	Kramatorsk Heavy Duty Machine Tool Plant	Ukraine	Tatra 815-7	8×8 truck	155 mm L/52	
Archer – FH77BW	—	BAE Systems AB	Sweden	Volvo A30D	6×6 articulated hauler:	155 mm L/52	
CAESAR Mk1	—	KNDS France	France	Renault Sherpa 5	6×6 truck	155 mm L/52	
CAESAR Mk1	—	KNDS France Excalibur Army	Czechia France	Tatra 817	8×8 truck	155 mm L/52	
AGM "Artillery Gun Module"	RCH-155	KNDS Deutschland	Germany	Boxer	8×8 AFV	155 mm L/52	
Zuzana 2	—	Konštrukta Defence	Slovakia	Tatra 815	8×8 truck	155 mm L/52	

==== Self-propelled howitzers in development ====
Model	Variant	Manufacturer	Origin	Base vehicle	Vehicle type	Calibre	Notes
Tracked howitzers
M109	M109-52	BAE System Rheinmetall	United States Germany	M109 chassis	Tracked armoured vehicle	155 mm L/52	
UE ATP Cadenas	—	Indra EM&E	Spain	—	Tracked armoured vehicle	155 mm L/52	
Wheeled howitzers
AGM "Artillery Gun Module"	Piranha AAC "Advanced Artillery Carrier"	KNDS Deutschland GDELS Mowag	Germany Switzerland	Mowag Piranha IV HMC	10×10 AFV	155 mm L/52	
AGM "Artillery Gun Module"	—	KNDS Deutschland	Germany	Iveco Trakker	8×8 truck	155 mm L/52	
Archer – FH77BW	—	BAE Systems AB	Sweden	Rheinmetall HX2 (HX44M)	8×8 truck	155 mm L/52	
Archer – FH77BW	—	BAE Systems AB	Sweden United States	Oshkosh HEMTT	10×10 truck	155 mm L/52	
ARVE	—	Patria	Finland	SISU E13TP	8×8 truck	155 mm L/52	
ATMOS 2000	—	Elbit Systems ROMARM	Israel Romania	—	6×6 truck or 8×8 truck	155 mm L/52	
ATP "Artillery Turret Platform"	—	Rheinmetall	Germany	Rheinmetall HX3	10×10 truck	155 mm L/52 and L/60	
CAESAR Mk2	—	KNDS France	France	Arquus Sherpa 10	6×6 truck	155 mm L/52	
DITA	—	Excalibur Army	Czechia	Tatra 817	8×8 truck	155 mm L/45	
EVA	—	Konštrukta Defence	Slovakia	Tatra 815-7	6×6 truck	155 mm L/52	
EVA	—	Konštrukta Defence	Slovakia	Tatra 817	8×8 truck	155 mm L/52	
EVA M2	—	Konštrukta Defence	Slovakia	Tatra 815-7	6×6 truck	155 mm L/52	
EVA M2	—	Konštrukta Defence	Slovakia	Tatra 817	8×8 truck	155 mm L/52	
H-155	—	UNIS Group	Bosnia	FAP 2832	6×6 truck	155 mm L/52	
MORANA	—	Excalibur Army	Czechia	Tatra 817	8×8 truck	155 mm L/52	
SIGMA SPH	—	Elbit Systems Rheinmetall	Israel Germany	Rheinmetall HX3	10×10 truck	155 mm L/52	
UE ATP Ruedas	—	Indra EM&E	Spain	—	—	155 mm L/52	

=== Towed howitzers ===
==== Towed howitzers in production ====
Model	Variant	Manufacturer	Origin	Calibre	Notes
76 mm
M48 (mountain gun)	M48 B1A5	UNIS Group	Bosnia	76 mm L/15	
105 mm
GIAT LG1	LG1 Mk3	KNDS France	France	105 mm L/30	
L119 light gun	—	BAE Systems	United Kingdom Ukraine	105 mm L/30	
M-56	M56A1 / M56A2	UNIS Group	Bosnia	105 mm L/28	
OTO Melara Mod 56	—	Leonardo (formerly OTO Melara)	Italy	105 mm L/14	
122 mm
122-mm howitzer D-30	D30J	UNIS Group	Bosnia	122 mm L/39	
155 mm
155 GH 52 APU	155 K 98	Patria	Finland	155 mm L/52	
FH-70	—	Leonardo (formerly OTO Melara)	Italy	155 mm L/39	
M777	—	BAE Systems	United Kingdom	155 mm L/39	
SIAC 155/52	—	GDELS SBS	Spain	155 mm L/52	
Towed 155 mm	—	UNIS Group	Bosnia	155 mm L/52	
Trajan	—	KNDS France Larsen & Toubro	France India	155 mm L/52	Gun of the CAESAR with a modified carriage of the TRF1.

== Mortars ==
=== Self-propelled mortars ===
==== Self-propelled mortars in production ====
Mortar system	Variant	Manufacturer	Origin	Base vehicle	Vehicle type	Calibre	Notes
Armoured vehicle with a turreted mortar
M120 Rak	M120K	Huta Stalowa Wola	Poland	KTO Rosomak	8×8 AFV	120 mm	
Mjölner	CV90 Grkpbv 90	BAE Systems AB Konštrukta Defence	Sweden Slovakia	CV90	Tracked AFV	2 ×120 mm	
NEMO *NEw MOrtar*	NEMO Land Turrets	Patria	Finland	Patria AMV / AMV^{XP}	8×8 AFV	120 mm	
NEMO *NEw MOrtar*	NEMO Land Turrets	Patria	Finland	Patria 6×6	6×6 AFV	120 mm	
NEMO *NEw MOrtar*	NEMO Land Turrets	Patria	Finland	Boxer	8×8 AFV	120 mm	
NEMO *NEw MOrtar*	NEMO Land Turrets	Patria	Finland	LAV II	8×8 AFV	120 mm	
NEMO *NEw MOrtar*	NEMO Land Turrets	Patria	Finland	AMPV	Tracked AFV	120 mm	
NEMO *NEw MOrtar*	NEMO Land Turrets	Patria	Finland	KF-41 Lynx	Tracked AFV	120 mm	
NEMO *NEw MOrtar*	NEMO container systems	Patria	Finland	—	Trucks, or vessels	120 mm	
SAM120	—	ZTS Special Kerametal	Slovakia	Tatra 815-7 (6×6)	6×6 truck	120 mm	
Armoured vehicle with an open-hatch
2R2M "Rifled Recoiled Mounted Mortar"	Griffon MEPAC	Thales KNDS France	France	VBMR Griffon	6×6 AFV	120 mm	
2R2M "Rifled Recoiled Mounted Mortar"	SPM 120	Thales	France	DefTech AV8	8×8 AFV	120 mm	
2R2M "Rifled Recoiled Mounted Mortar"	VBM Freccia Porta Mortaio	Thales Iveco Defence Vehicles	France Italy	Freccia	8×8 AFV	120 mm	
2R2M "Rifled Recoiled Mounted Mortar"	—	Thales Arquus	France	VAB 6×6	6×6 AFV	120 mm	
2R2M "Rifled Recoiled Mounted Mortar"	—	Thales	France	FNSS ACV-S	Tracked AFV	120 mm	
2R2M "Rifled Recoiled Mounted Mortar"	—	Thales	France	M113	Tracked AFV	120 mm	
Cobra	12 cm Mörser 16	RUAG GDELS Mowag	Switzerland	Mowag Piranha IV	8×8 AFV	120 mm	
Cobra	—	RUAG	Switzerland	PARS III 8x8	8×8 AFV	120 mm	
ESLAIT A3MS "Advanced Automated Autonomous Mortar System"	—	ELSAIT GDELS Mowag	Israel Austria Switzerland	Mowag Piranha V	8×8 AFV	120 mm	Based on Cardom 10 system
VingPos MWS "Mortar Weapon System"	CV90 RWS Multi BK	Rheinmetall Nordic AS	Norway	CV90 MkI	Tracked AFV	81 mm	It uses the L16A2 mortar barrel.
Vehicle with turntable mounted mortar
Dual EIMOS	—	Rheinmetall Expal	Spain	URO Vamtac ST5	4×4 AFV	81 mm	
ESLAIT A3MS "Advanced Automated Autonomous Mortar System"	—	ELSAIT UROVESA	Israel Austria Spain	URO Vamtac	4×4 AFV	81 mm	Based on Cardom 10 system
Light rear mounted mortar
Alakran	—	Milanion NTGS "New Technologies Global Systems" UROVESA	Spain	URO Vamtac S3	4×4 AFV	120 mm	
Alakran	—	Milanion NTGS "New Technologies Global Systems"	Spain	Bars-8	4×4 AFV	120 mm	

==== Self-propelled mortars in development ====
Mortar system	Variant	Manufacturer	Origin	Base vehicle	Vehicle type	Calibre	Notes
Armoured vehicle with a turreted mortar
Crossbow	MTPz SGrW "Schwere Granatwerfer"	Elbit Systems GDELS Austria	Israel Austria	Pandur I (6×6)	6×6 AFV	120 mm	
GMOS "Guardian Mortar System"	—	Escribano GDELS SBS	Spain	VAC (ASCOD 2) "Vehículo de Apoyo de Cadenas"	Tracked AFV	120 mm	
GMOS "Guardian Mortar System"	—	Escribano GDELS SBS and Mowag	Spain Switzerland	Dragon VCR (Piranha V)	8×8 AFV	120 mm	
M69 Rak	—	Huta Stalowa Wola	Poland	Borsuk	Tracked AFV	120 mm	
Armoured vehicle with an open-hatch
2R2M "Rifled Recoiled Mounted Mortar"	MMCV "Manoeuvre Mortar combat vehicle"	Thales MHI	France Japan	CTWV	8×8 AFV	120 mm	
MWS 120 Ragnarok "Mortar Weapon System"	—	Rheinmetall Nordic AS	Norway Germany	ARTEC Boxer	8×8 AFV	120 mm	
MWS 120 Ragnarok "Mortar Weapon System"	—	Rheinmetall Nordic AS	Norway Germany	ACSV G5	Tracked AFV	120 mm	
MWS 120 Ragnarok "Mortar Weapon System"	—	Rheinmetall Nordic AS	Norway	Nurol Ejder	4×4 AFV	120 mm	
Vehicle with a turntable mounted mortar
TREMOS "Traditional REborn Mortar System"	—	Patria	Finland	Sisu GTP	Trucks, 4×4, 6×6 and 8×8 AFV, or Tracked AFV	81 mm, or 120 mm	
Light rear mounted mortar
Alakran / Alakran S	—	Milanion NTGS "New Technologies Global Systems"	Spain	Sherpa Light, Flyer 72 HD, or Humvee	4×4 AFV	81 mm, or 120 mm	
Alakran / Alakran S	—	Milanion NTGS "New Technologies Global Systems"	Spain	Polaris RZR, Toyota Land Cruiser (J79)	4×4 utility vehicles	81 mm, or 120 mm	
Alakran / Alakran S	—	Milanion NTGS "New Technologies Global Systems"	Spain	Hägglunds BV206	Tracked articulated vehicles	81 mm, or 120 mm	
EMOC	—	Escribano	Spain	Polaris RZR, Toyota Land Cruiser (J79)	4×4 utility vehicles	81 mm, or 120 mm	
Viper	—	Defenture	Netherlands Spain France	Defenture GRF	4×4 AFV	81 mm, or 120 mm	EMOC system, 2R2M mortar tube.

=== Towed mortars ===
==== Towed mortars in production ====
Mortar system	Variant	Manufacturer	Origin	Calibre	Notes
MO-120 RT "Mortier 120 mm Rayé Tracté"	—	Thales	France	120 mm	
81 mm light towed mortar	—	Konštrukta Defence	Slovakia	81 mm	
98 mm light towed mortar	—	Konštrukta Defence	Slovakia	98 mm	
PRAM L, Type 82	—	Konštrukta Defence	Slovakia	120 mm	

==== Towed mortars in development ====
Mortar system	Variant	Manufacturer	Origin	Calibre	Notes
MWS 120 Ragnarok "Mortar Weapon System"	Ragnarok trailer	Rheinmetall Nordic AS	Norway	120 mm	An automatically aiming mortar on a turntable installed on a trailer.

=== Mortars on base plate or bipods ===
==== Mortars on base plate or bipods in production ====
Mortar system	Variant	Manufacturer	Origin	Calibre	Notes
Light infantry mortar
KBA-118	—	—	Ukraine	60 mm	
LM-60	LM-60D	Zakłady Mechaniczne Tarnów.	Poland	60 mm	
LM-60	LM-60K	Zakłady Mechaniczne Tarnów.	Poland	60 mm	
LMP-2017	—	Zakłady Mechaniczne Tarnów.	Poland	60 mm	
M6	M6 - 895	Hirtenberger	Austria	60 mm	
M6	M6 - 1000	Hirtenberger	Austria	60 mm	
M57	—	UNIS Group	Bosnia	60 mm	
M70 commando	—	UNIS Group	Bosnia	60 mm	
M90	—	UNIS Group	Bosnia	60 mm	
M-60 Kamerton	—	—	Ukraine	60 mm	
RSG60	—	Rheinmetall	Germany	60 mm	
Infantry mortar
81mm LLR "Long Light Reinforced Mortar"	TDA 81	Thales	France	81 mm	
E44	E44-E1	Hellenic Defence Systems	Greece	81 mm	
KBA-48M	—	—	Ukraine	82 mm	
M8	M8 - 1165	Hirtenberger	Austria	81 mm	
M8	M8 - 1365	Hirtenberger	Austria	81 mm	
M69	M69A	UNIS Group	Bosnia	82 mm	
M69	M69B	UNIS Group	Bosnia	82 mm	
M98	—	Huta Stalowa Wola	Poland	98 mm	
M-08	—	Rheinmetall Expal	Spain	60 mm	
MX2-KM 81 mm	—	Rheinmetall Expal	Spain	81 mm	
Heavy mortar
E56	—	Hellenic Defence Systems	Greece	120 mm	
M12	M12 - 1385	Hirtenberger	Austria	120 mm	
M12	M12 - 1535	Hirtenberger	Austria	120 mm	
M74	—	UNIS Group	Bosnia	120 mm	
M75	—	UNIS Group	Bosnia	120 mm	
M120	—	Huta Stalowa Wola	Poland	120 mm	
M120-15 Molot	—	—	Ukraine	120 mm	
MX2-SM 120 mm	—	Rheinmetall Expal	Spain	120 mm	

== See also ==
- List of weapon systems in production and in development by the European defence industry
  - List of land weapon systems in production and in development by the European defence industry
    - European tanks in production and in development
    - European armoured vehicles in production and in development
  - List of naval weapon systems in production and in development by the European defence industry
    - European naval weapons in production and in development
  - List of aerial weapon systems in production and in development by the European defence industry
    - European military fixed wing aircraft in production / development
    - European military rotorcraft in production / development
    - List of military drones in production and in development by the European defence industry
    - European military aircraft mechanical systems in production / development
    - List of military aircraft electronic systems in production and in development by the European defence industry
    - European aircraft weapons in production / development
    - List of air defence systems and radars in production and in development by the European defence industry
    - List of aerospace defence companies in Europe
