= Remote controlled weapon station =

Weapon system for combat platforms

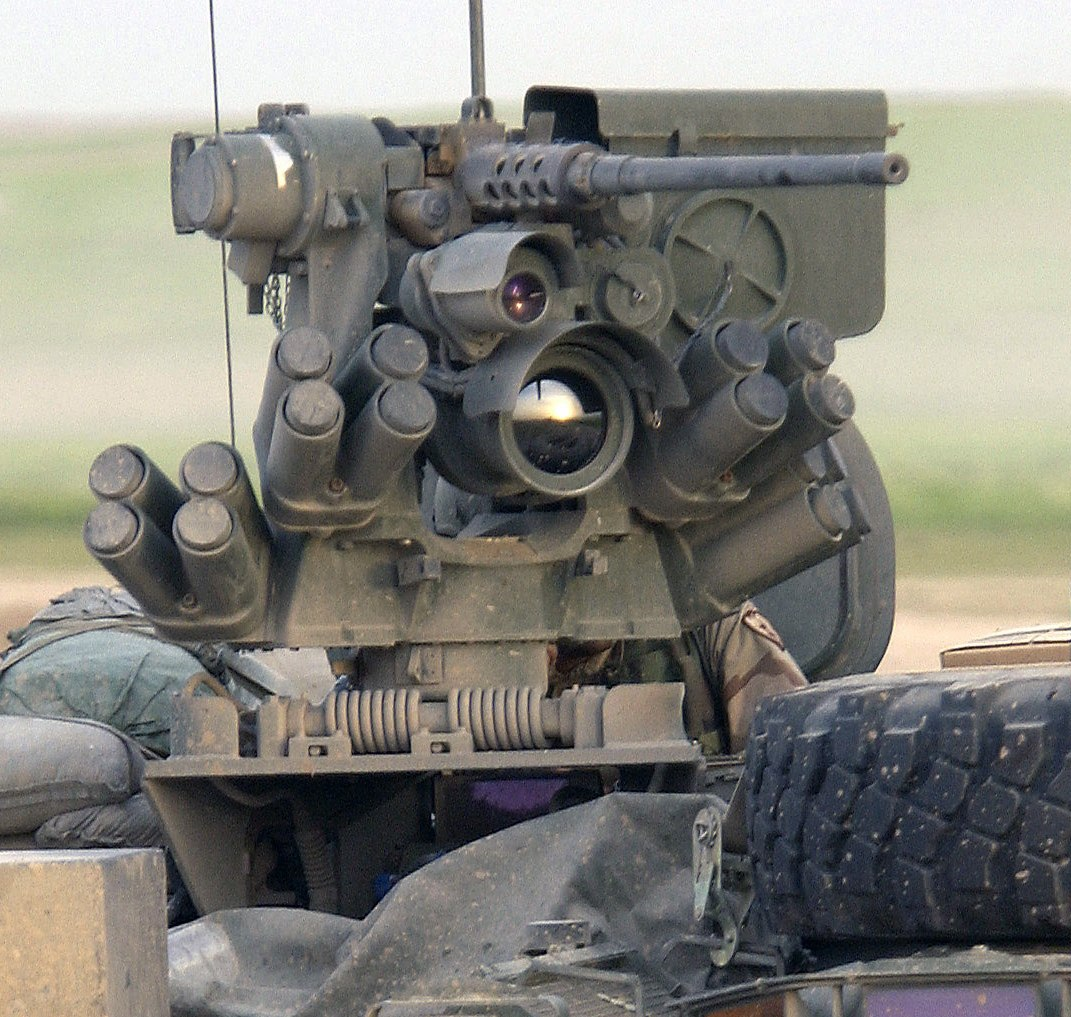
A Kongsberg/Thales Protector M151 with an M2 heavy machine gun on a M1126 Stryker

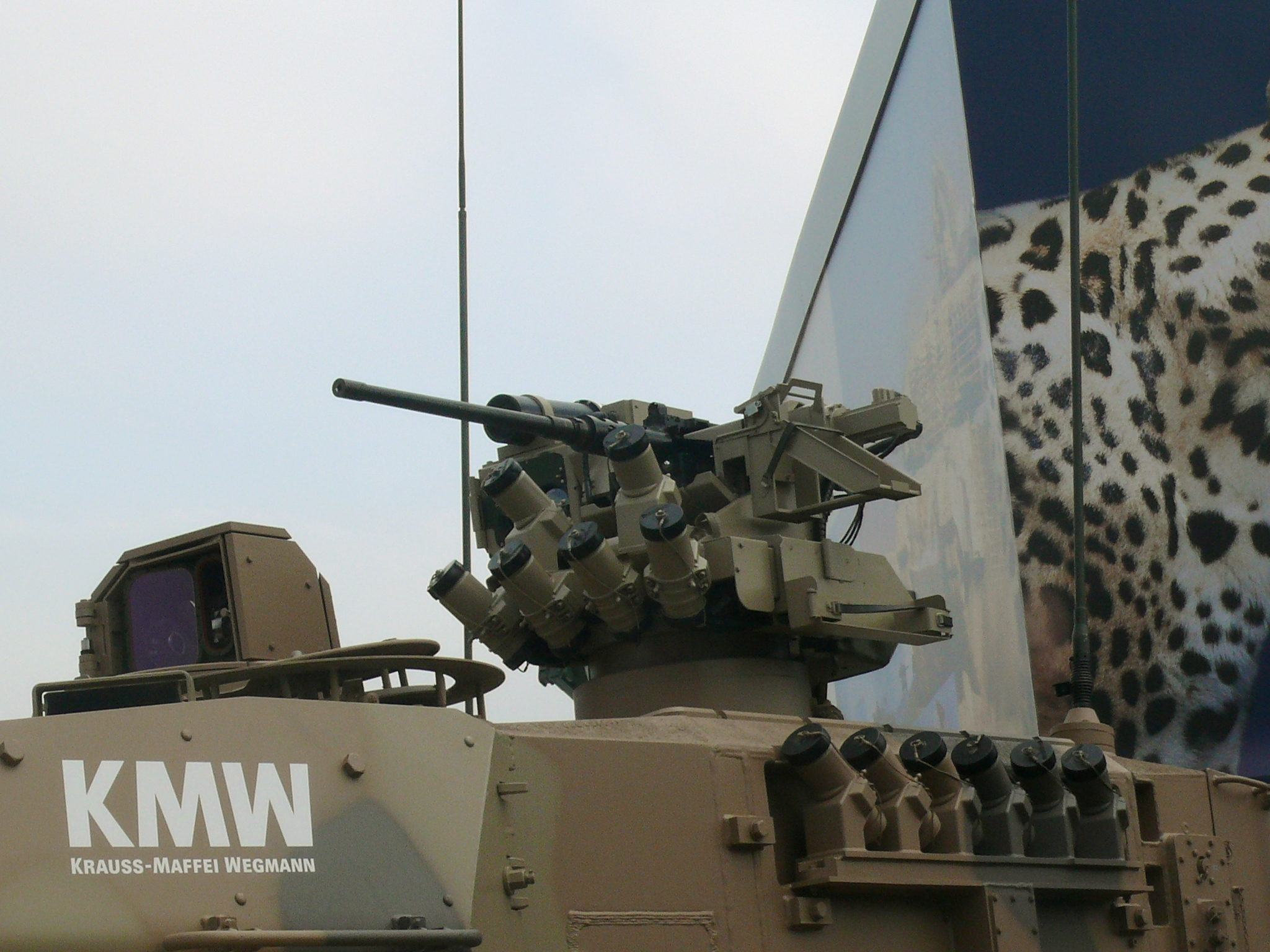
A heavy FLW 200 made by Krauss-Maffei Wegmann for the German Army

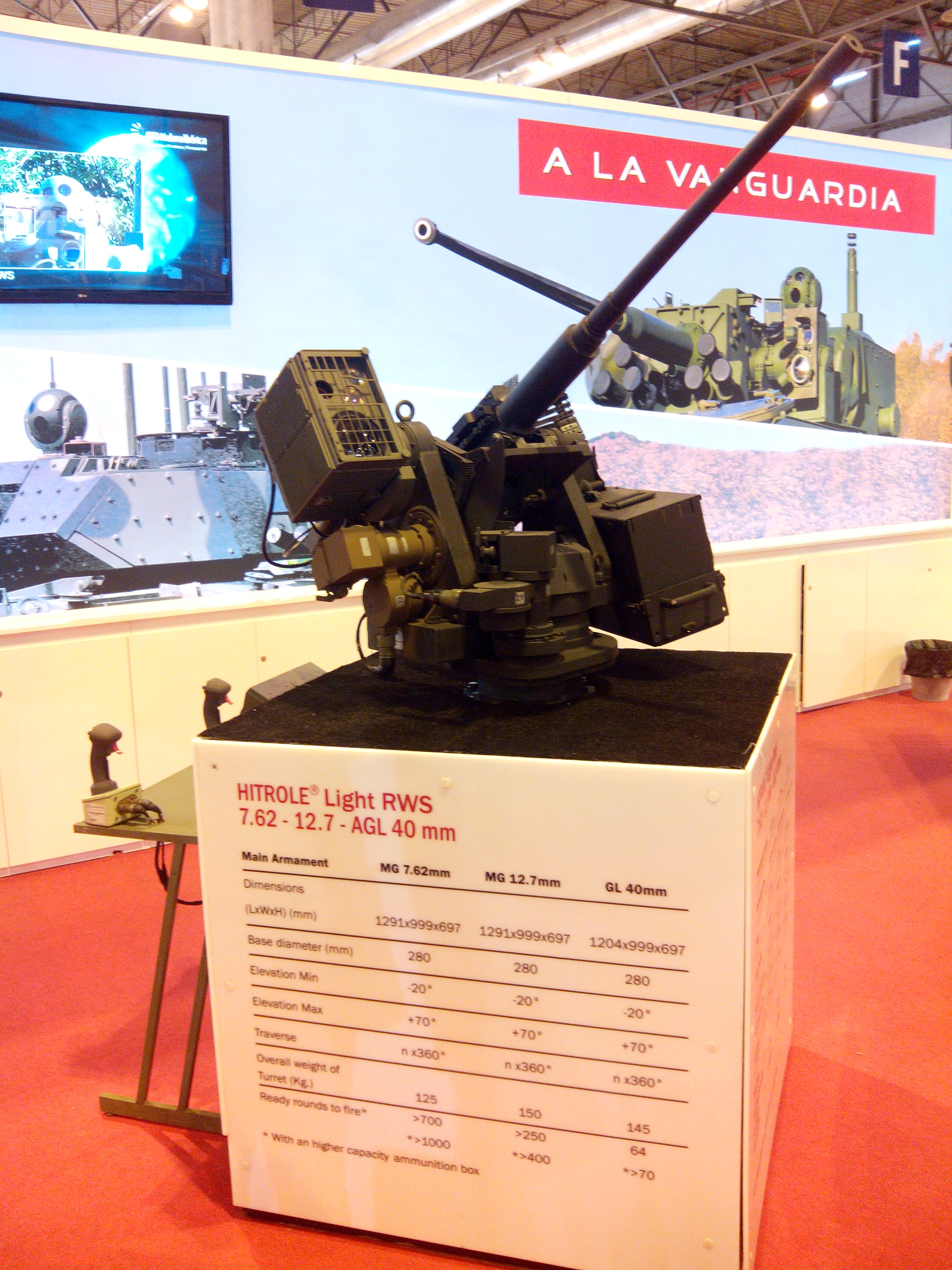
A light remote weapon system made by OTO Melara Iberica

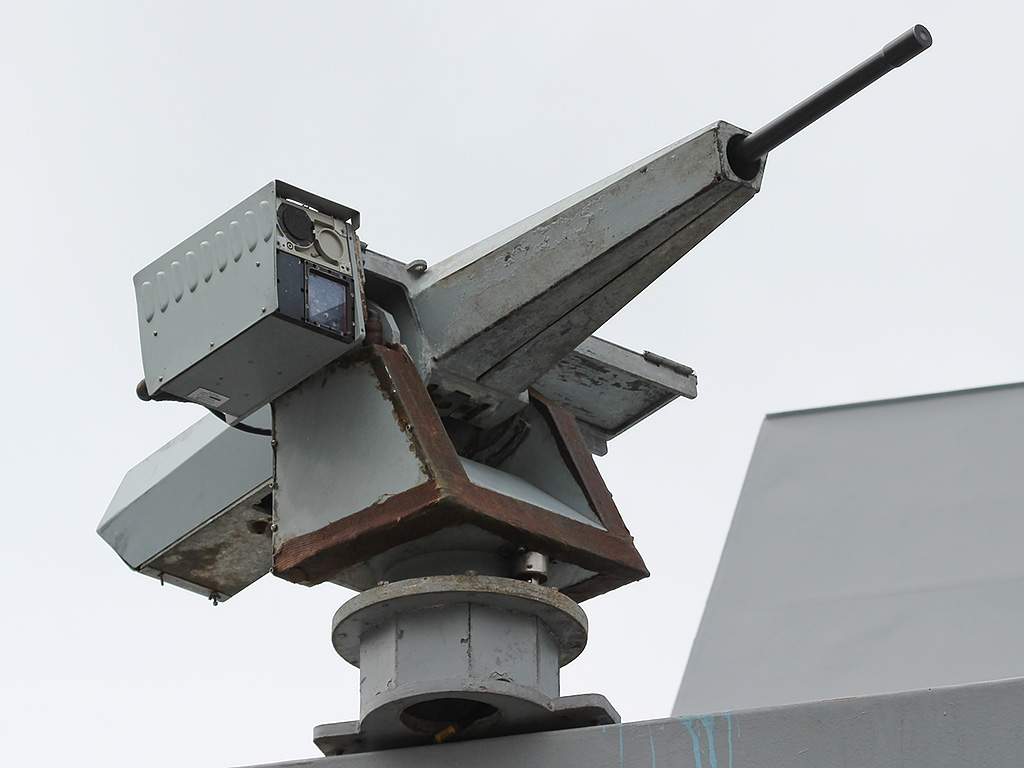
A Sea Rogue fitted with a 12.7 mm machine gun mounted on a Valour class frigate of the South African Navy

A remote controlled weapon station (RCWS), remotely operated weapon system (ROWS), or remote weapon system (RWS), is a remotely operated light or medium-caliber weapon system, often equipped with a fire-control system, that can be installed on a ground combat vehicle or sea- and air-based combat platform.

Such equipment is used on modern military vehicles, as it allows a gunner to remain in the relative protection of the vehicle. It may be retrofitted onto existing vehicles, for example, the CROWS system is being fitted to American Humvees.

== Examples ==
- Australia
  - Electro Optic Systems: Slinger
  - R400S
- Belgium
  - FN Herstal: deFNder Family
- Brazil
  - REMAX
- Canada
  - Rheinmetall Canada: Fieldranger
- China
  - UW4A
  - CS/LK4
  - H/PJ17
- Egypt
  - X-29
  - Eagle 1
  - Eagle 2
- France
  - Hornet
  - Hornet Lite
  - Hornet S
- Finland
  - Patria: PML 127 OWS
- Georgia:
  - DRWS-1
  - DRWS-2
  - RWS-23
- Germany:
  - FLW 100, FLW 200 and FLW 200+
  - Rheinmetall MSSA
- India:
  - BEL RCWS
  - MDSL RWS
  - SHARANG RWS
- Indonesia
  - RESPATI Mk. III
  - Pindad RCWS
- Iran
  - ARIO-H762
  - Raad – 30mm remote control turret
- Israel:
  - Typhoon Weapon System
  - Samson Remote Controlled Weapon Station
  - Rafael Overhead Weapon Station
- Italy:
  - Hitfist
  - Hitfist OWS
  - Hitrole
- Japan:
  - Surface vessels weapon station (remote-controlled)
- South Korea:
  - Hyundai Wia KR-6
- Mexico
  - Saraf Balam I
  - Saraf Balam II
- Norway
  - Kongsberg Defence Systems: Protector (RWS)
- Philippines
  - Controller Operated Battle Ready Armament
- Poland
  - ZSMU Kobuz
  - ZSSW-30
- Romania
  - Pro Optica Anubis
- Russia
  - Bumerang-BM – 30mm remote control turret
  - AU-220M – 57mm remote control turret
  - Arbalet-DM
  - Serval
- South Africa
  - BAE Systems Land Systems South Africa: TRT-25 remote weapon station
  - Reutech Solutions: Rogue
- Spain
  - Land:
    - Escribano: Guardian ASPIS (M240 machine gun)
    - Escribano: Guardian 1.5
    - Escribano: Guardian L-Hit (M230 chain gun)
    - Escribano: Guardian 2.0 (M2 Browning, M134D)
    - Escribano: Guardian 30 (Mk44 Bushmaster II, Shipunov 2A42)
  - Naval:
    - Escribano: Sentinel ASPIS
    - Escribano: Sentinel 1.5
    - Escribano: Sentinel 20 (Oerlikon KAA)
    - Escribano: Sentinel ROCKET
    - Escribano: Sentinel 2.0
    - Escribano: Sentinel 30 (Mk44 Bushmaster II)
- Sweden
  - Saab: Trackfire
- Taiwan
  - XTR-101/102 – 20mm remote control turret
  - NCSIST 2.75in rockets remote weapon station
- Turkey
  - Aselsan SMASH: It is a stabilized weapon station manufactured by Aselsan and fitted with 30mm Mk44 Bushmaster II autocanon.
  - Aselsan STOP : It is fitted with either a 25 mm Oerlikon KBA or a M242 Bushmaster autocanon.
  - Aselsan STAMP, Aselsan STAMP-2: These can be fitted with either a 7.62 mm / 12.7 mm machine gun or a 40 mm grenade launcher.
  - Aselsan STAMP-G: It can be fitted with either a 12.7 mm GAU-19 gatling gun or a 7.62 mm / 12.7 mm machine gun or a 40 mm Mk 19 grenade launcher.
  - Aselsan SARP: It can be fitted with either a 7.62 mm / 12.7 mm machine gun.
- Ukraine
  - SPYS-SYNTEZ, NATO nomenclature code: 2510-61-015-0429
  - Parus
  - Doublet
  - Taipan
  - Shturm-M
  - Kastet
- United Kingdom
  - MSI-Defence Systems: Seahawk DS Remote
  - Thales: SWARM
- United States
  - CROWS
  - Typhoon Weapon Station: Typhoon models designated MK38 MOD 2 and later MK 38 MOD 3, and the Mini-Typhoon models designated MK49 MOD 0 ROSAM (Remote Operated Small Arms Mount) and later MK49 MOD 1.

== See also ==
- Gun turret
- Sentry gun
- Close-in weapon system
