= List of military rotorcraft in production and in development by the European defence industry =

This list of military rotorcraft in production and in development by the European defence industry aims at summarising the current status of the aerospace defence industry in Europe. This list focuses on the Western European military block industry, and excludes Russia, Belarus and Serbia.

Some of the systems included have foreign participation, some others are 100% European. The main participants in the systems are mentioned.

== Armed helicopters ==
=== Armed helicopters in production ===
| Model | Variant | Origin | Type | Role | Notes |
Land attack helicopter
| Agusta A129 Mangusta | TAI / AW T129ATAK | Italy / Turkey | Helicopter | Attack | |
| Airbus H155 / KAI LCH; Military AS365 Dauphin | KAI LAH; Korea Aerospace Industries; Light Armed Helicopter | France / South Korea | Light helicopter | Light combat helicopter | |
| Eurocopter EC 665 Tiger | Tiger Mk.II / Mk.III | France / Germany / Spain | Stealthy helicopter | Attack | |
Multi-role helicopters used for scout / attack missions
| AgustaWestland AW159 Wildcat | AW159 Wildcat AH1 | UK | Light helicopter | Scout | |
| Airbus H125M | — | France / Germany | Light helicopter | Scout | Armed with HForce system. |
| Airbus H145M | — | Germany | Light helicopter | Scout | Armed with HForce system. |
| Airbus H225M | — | France / Germany | Medium-lift helicopter | Scout | Armed with HForce system. |

=== Armed helicopters in development ===
| Model | Variant | Origin | Type | Role | Notes |
Land attack helicopter
| Airbus H215 / KAI KUH-1 Surion; Formerly known as AS332 Super Puma | MAH Marineon; Marine Attack Helicopter | France / South Korea | Medium-lift helicopter | Medium combat helicopter | |
| Leonardo Helicopters AW249 Fenice | — | Italy | Stealthy helicopter | Attack | |
Multi-role helicopters used for scout / attack missions
| AgustaWestland AW109 | AW109M | Italy | Light helicopter | Scout / armed escort | |
| AgustaWestland AW139 | AW139M | Italy | Light helicopter | Scout / armed escort | |
| AgustaWestland AW149 | — | Italy / Poland | Light helicopter | Scout | |
| AgustaWestland AW169 | AW169MA Lion | Italy | Light helicopter | Scout | |
| Airbus H160 | HIL - H160M Guépard; Helicoptère interarmées léger | France | Light helicopter | Scout | |

== Land-based helicopters ==
=== Land-based helicopters in production ===
| Model | Variant | Origin | Type | Role | Notes |
Multi-role helicopters
| Airbus H125; Formerly AS350 Écureuil | (1 engines) | France | Light helicopter | Air defence / surveillance / mission support | |
| Airbus H125M; Formerly AS550 Fennec | (2 engines) | France | Light helicopter | Transport / ISTAR / special forces | |
| Airbus H135M; Formerly EC635 | — | Germany | Light helicopter | Utility / transport / VIP transport / ISTAR / special operations / disaster response / SAR / MEDEVAC | |
| Airbus H145M; Formerly EC145 | — | Germany | Light helicopter | Utility / transport / VIP transport / ISTAR / special operations / disaster response / SAR / MEDEVAC | |
| Airbus H145M; Formerly EC145 | UH-72 Lakota | Germany / USA | Light helicopter | Utility / operations support / homeland security / counter-drug / disaster response / SAR / MEDEVAC | |
| Airbus H215M | — | France | Medium-lift helicopter | Utility / troop transport / special operations / disaster response / SAR / CSAR / CASEVAC | |
| Airbus H225M | — | France | Medium-lift helicopter | Utility / troop transport / tactical transport / special operations / fire support / disaster response / CASEVAC | |
| NHIndustries NH90 | NH90 TTH (TTH Caïman / TTH Caïman Mk2 / UH-90A / MH-90A / HT-29 Caimán / Hkp 14) | Co-founders: France / Germany / Italy / Netherlands; Partners: Finland / Spain | Medium-lift helicopter | Utility / troop transport / tactical transport / special operations / fire support / disaster response / SAR / MEDEVAC / CASEVAC | |
| AgustaWestland AW-101 | — | UK / Italy | Medium-lift helicopter | Utility / troop transport / tactical transport / artillery transport / infiltration / special operations / fire support / disaster response / SAR / CSAR / MEDEVAC / CASEVAC | |
| Airbus H215 / KAI KUH-1 Surion; Formerly known as AS332 Super Puma | KUH-1 Surion | France / South Korea | Medium-lift helicopter | Utility / troop transport / tactical transport | |
| Airbus H215 / KAI KUH-1 Surion; Formerly known as AS332 Super Puma | KUH-1M | France / South Korea | Medium-lift helicopter | MEDEVAC | |
| Eurocopter AS565 Panther | AS565K (HM-1 Pantera) | France / Brazil | Light helicopter | Utility / troop transport / tactical transport | |
| AgustaWestland AW109 | AW109 TrekkerM | Italy | Light helicopter | Utility / troop transport / infiltration / special operations / C2 / SAR / MEDEVAC / CASEVAC | |
| AgustaWestland AW139 | AW139M | Italy | Medium-lift helicopter | Utility / troop transport / infiltration / special operations / C2 / SAR / CSAR / MEDEVAC / CASEVAC | |
| AgustaWestland AW149 | AW149M | Italy | Medium-lift helicopter | Utility / troop transport / infiltration / special operations / C2 / SAR / CSAR / MEDEVAC / CASEVAC | |
| AgustaWestland AW169 | AW169M | Italy | Medium-lift helicopter | Utility / troop transport / infiltration / special operations / ISTAR / SAR / CSAR / MEDEVAC / CASEVAC | |
| AgustaWestland AW139 | Boeing MH-139A Grey Wolf | Italy / USA | Medium-lift helicopter | Nuclear security missions (convoy escort, emergency response), government officials transport / operation support / SAR / MEDEVAC | |
| PZL Mielec / Sikorsky S-70 | — | USA / Poland | Bla Bla | Utility / troop transport / infiltration / special operations / C2 / SAR / CSAR / MEDEVAC / CASEVAC | Licence built |

=== Land-based helicopters in development ===
| Model | Variant | Origin | Type | Role | Notes |
Tracked vehicles
| AgustaWestland AW169 | AW169MA Lion | Italy | Light helicopter | Utility / troop transport / tactical transport / fire support / disaster response / SAR / MEDEVAC | |
| AgustaWestland AW609 | — | Italy | Medium-lift tiltrotor | Multirole | |
| Airbus H160 | HIL - H160M Guépard; Helicoptère interarmées léger | France | Light helicopter | Utility / surveillance / reconnaissance / C2 / infiltration / special operations / ISTAR / air defence / SAR | |
| Airbus H175 | H175M | France / Germany / China | Medium-lift helicopter | Utility / transport / VIP transport / reconnaissance / special forces / ISTAR / SAR / MEDEVAC | |
| Boeing CH-47 Chinook | Boeing / Airbus H-47F Block II | USA / Germany | Heavy-lift helicopter | Cargo / transport / tactical transport | Potential German production. |
| Kopter AW09 | — | Switzerland | Light helicopter, high altitude | Utility / transport / VIP transport / reconnaissance / special forces / ISTAR / SAR / MEDEVAC | |
| NHIndustries NH90 | NH90 SF | France / Germany / Italy / Netherlands | Medium-lift helicopter | Special operations / counter-terrorism / infiltration / ISTAR | |
| NHIndustries NH90 | NH90 Block 2 | France / Germany / Italy / Netherlands | Medium-lift helicopter | Multirole | |

== Maritime helicopters ==
=== Maritime helicopters in production ===
| Model | Variant | Origin | Type | Role | Notes |
Anti-surface / anti submarine warfare helicopters
| AgustaWestland AW159 Wildcat | AW159 Wildcat HMA2 | UK | Light helicopter | ASW / ASuW | |
| AgustaWestland AW-101 | EH-101A (or known as Model 110) | Italy | Medium-lift helicopter | ASW / ASuW | |
| AgustaWestland AW-101 | Merlin HM1 / HM2 (or known as Model 111) | UK | Medium-lift helicopter | ASW / ASuW | |
| Airbus AS565 Panther | Airbus AS565 MBe Panther | France | Light helicopter | ASW / ASuW | |
| Airbus H215 | Airbus H215M Cougar (or known as AS532 Cougar) | France | Medium-lift helicopter | ASW / ASuW | |
| Airbus H225M | — | France / Brazil | Medium-lift helicopter | ASW / ASuW | |
| NHIndustries NH90 | NH90 NFH (NFH Caïman / Sea Lion / Sea Tiger / HSPN) | Co-founders: France / Germany / Italy / Netherlands; Partners: Finland / Spain | Medium-lift helicopter | ASW / ASuW / SAR / VERTREP | |
Early warning helicopter
| AgustaWestland AW-101 | Model 112 | Italy | Medium-lift helicopter | AEW&C | |
| AgustaWestland AW-101 | Merlin HM2 (Crowsnest (ASaCh)) | UK | Medium-lift helicopter | AEW&C | |
Search and rescue helicopters
| AgustaWestland AW-101 | Model 512 SAR / 610 SAR / CSAR / 614 | UK / Italy | Medium-lift helicopter | SAR, CSAR | |
| AgustaWestland AW-101 | Model 612 (SAR Queen) | UK / Italy | Medium-lift helicopter | SAR | |
| AgustaWestland AW-101 | CH-149 Cormorant | UK / Italy / Canada | Medium-lift helicopter | SAR | |
| AgustaWestland AW109 | AW109M | Italy | Light helicopter | SAR / MEDEVAC / Surveillance | |
| AgustaWestland AW139 | — | Italy | Light helicopter | SAR / utility | |
| Airbus AS565 Panther | Airbus AS565 MBe Panther | France | Light helicopter | SAR / disaster elief | |
| Airbus H160 | H160B | France | Light helicopter | SAR | |
Minesweeper
| AgustaWestland AW-101 | Kawazaki Heavy Industries MCH-101 (or known as Model 518) | UK / Italy / Japan | Medium-lift helicopter | Transport / minesweeper | |
| Airbus H215 / KAI KUH-1 Surion; Formerly known as AS332 Super Puma | MUH-1 Marineon | France / South Korea | Medium-lift helicopter | Transport / minesweeper / amphibious operations support | |
Utility
| Airbus H135 | — | France / Brazil | Light helicopter | Utility | |

=== Maritime helicopters in development ===
| Model | Variant | Origin | Type | Role | Notes |
Anti-surface / anti submarine warfare helicopters
| Airbus H215 / KAI KUH-1 Surion; Formerly known as AS332 Super Puma | KAI KUH-1 ASW | France / South Korea | Medium Helicopter | ASuW / ASW | |
Multi-role helicopters
| NATO NGRC; NATO Next Generation Rotorcraft Capability | — | France / Germany / Greece / Italy / Netherlands / UK | Medium Helicopter | ASW / ASuW / SAR / VERTREP / transport | |
| Airbus H160 | HIL - H160M Guépard; Helicoptère interarmées léger | France | Light helicopter | ASuW / SAR / Reconnaissance | |

== Training helicopters ==
=== Training helicopters in production ===
| Model | Variant | Origin | Type | Role | Notes |
|---|---|---|---|---|---|
| AgustaWestland AW109 | AW109 TrekkerM | Italy | Light helicopter | Training | |
| AgustaWestland AW119 | AW119T / TH-73A | Italy / USA | Light helicopter | Training | |
| AgustaWestland AW119 | AW119Kx Koala | Italy | Light helicopter | Training | |
| AgustaWestland AW119 | AW119T | Italy | Light helicopter | Training | |
| AgustaWestland AW169 | AW169B Lion / AW169M | Italy | Light helicopter | Training | |
| Airbus H125; Formerly AS350 Fennec | — | France | Light helicopter | Training | |
| Airbus H125M; Formerly AS550 Fennec | — | France | Light helicopter | Training | |
| Airbus H135M; Formerly EC635 | TH135 | Germany | Light helicopter | Training | |
| Airbus H145M; Formerly EC145 | — | Germany | Light helicopter | Training | |
| Airbus H145M; Formerly EC145 | UH-72 Lakota | Germany / USA | Light helicopter | Training | |
| Guimbal Cabri G2 | — | France | Light helicopter | Training | |
| PZL SW-4 Puszczyk | — | Poland | Light helicopter | Training | |

=== Training helicopters in development ===
| Model | Variant | Origin | Type | Role | Notes |
|---|---|---|---|---|---|
| Kopter AW09 | — | Switzerland | Light helicopter, high altitude | Training | |

== See also ==
- List of weapon systems in production and in development by the European defence industry
  - List of land weapon systems in production and in development by the European defence industry
    - European tanks in production and in development
    - European indirect fire systems in production and in development
    - European armoured vehicles in production and in development
  - List of naval weapon systems in production and in development by the European defence industry
    - European naval weapons in production and in development
  - List of aerial weapon systems in production and in development by the European defence industry
    - European military fixed wing aircraft in production and in development
    - List of military drones in production and in development by the European defence industry
    - European military aircraft mechanical systems in production and in development
    - List of military aircraft electronic systems in production and in development by the European defence industry
    - European aircraft weapons in production and in development
    - List of air defence systems and radars in production and in development by the European defence industry
    - List of aerospace defence companies in Europe
