= List of naval weapons in production and in development by the European defence industry =

This llist of naval weapons in production and in development by the European defence industry aims at summarising the current status of the naval defence industry in Europe. This list focuses on the Western European military block industry, and excludes Russia, Belarus and Serbia.

Some of the systems included have foreign participation, some others are 100% European. The main participants in the systems are mentioned.

== Torpedoes ==
=== Heavy torpedoes ===
==== Heavy torpedoes in production ====
Weapon	Variant	Manufacturer	Origin	Type (role)	Clients	Notes
Black Shark Advanced	–	WASS (Leonardo)	Italy	Heavyweight torpedo (ASW and ASuW)	Chile, Ecuador, India, Indonesia,, Italy, Malaysia, Portugal, Singapore	
DM2A4 Seehecht	–	Atlas Elektronik	Germany	Heavyweight torpedo (ASW and ASuW)	Egypt, Germany, Greece, Israel, Pakistan, Spain, Turkey, UAE	
F21 Artemis	–	Naval Group, Thales, Atlas Elektronik	France / Germany	Heavyweight torpedo (ASW and ASuW)	Brazil, France, Netherlands	
Spearfish torpedo	Mod 1	BAE Systems Underwater Systems	United Kingdom	Heavyweight torpedo (ASW and ASuW)	United Kingdom	
Torped 2000	Tp 62 steg 2	Saab Dynamics AB	Sweden	Heavyweight torpedo (ASW and ASuW)	Sweden	

==== Heavy torpedoes in development ====
Weapon	Variant	Manufacturer	Origin	Type (role)	Clients	Notes
DM2A5 (CHWT) Common Heavy Weight Torpedo	–	Atlas Elektronik	Germany; Norway	Heavyweight torpedo (ASW and ASuW)	Germany, Norway	
Torped 63	Tp 63; Torped 63	Saab Dynamics AB	Sweden	Heavyweight torpedo (ASW and ASuW)	Sweden, Poland	

=== Lightweight torpedoes ===
==== Lightweight torpedoes in production ====
Weapon	Variant	Manufacturer	Origin	Type (role)	Clients	Notes
A244	A244 Mk4 - Black Arrow	WASS (Leonardo)	Italy	Lightweight torpedo (ASW)	Italy	
Black Scorpion	–	WASS (Leonardo)	Italy	Very lightweight torpedo (ASW and ASuW)	Italy, Cyprus, United Kingdom, UAE	Used for asymetric engagements.
MU90 Impact	MU90 Mk2	Eurotorp (WASS / Naval Group / Thales)	Italy {France	Lightweight torpedo (ASW)	Australia, Denmark, Egypt, France, Germany, Greece, Indonesia, Italy, Morocco, Poland, Singapore, UAE, Ukraine	
SLWT; Saab Lightweight Torpedo	Tp 47; Torped 47	Saab Dynamics AB	Sweden	Lightweight torpedo (ASW)	Finland, Sweden	
Sting Ray	Sting Ray Mod 1	BAE Systems Underwater Systems	United Kingdom	Lightweight torpedo (ASW)	Norway, Romania, Thauland, United Kingdom	

Note: the client list only includes the countries using it from surface ships and from submarines.

==== Lightweight torpedoes in development ====
Base vehicle	Model	Manufacturer	Origin	Type	Clients	Notes
Sting Ray	Sting Ray Mod 2	BAE Systems Underwater Systems	United Kingdom	Lightweight torpedo (ASW)	United Kingdom	

Note: the client list only includes the countries using it from surface ships and from submarines.

=== Anti-torpedo torpedoes ===
==== Anti-torpedo torpedoes in development ====
Base vehicle	Model	Manufacturer	Origin	Type	Clients	Notes
SeaSpider ATT; Anti-Torpedo Torpedo	–	Atlas Elektronik, Magellan	Germany, Canada, Netherlands	Anti-torpedo torpedo (rocket engine)	Germany, India, Netherlands	

== See also ==
- List of weapon systems in production and in development by the European defence industry
  - List of land weapon systems in production and in development by the European defence industry
    - European tanks in production and in development
    - European indirect fire systems in production and in development
    - European armoured vehicles in production and in development
  - List of naval weapon systems in production and in development by the European defence industry
  - List of aerial weapon systems in production and in development by the European defence industry
    - European military fixed wing aircraft in production and in development
    - European military rotorcraft in production and in development
    - List of military drones in production and in development by the European defence industry
    - European military aircraft mechanical systems in production and in development
    - List of military aircraft electronic systems in production and in development by the European defence industry
    - European aircraft weapons in production and in development
    - List of air defence systems and radars in production and in development by the European defence industry
    - List of aerospace defence companies in Europe
