= List of military fixed wing aircraft in production and in development by the European defence industry =

This list of military fixed wing aircraft in production and in development by the European defence industry aims at summarising the current status of the aerospace defence industry in Europe. This list focuses on the Western European military block industry, and excludes Russia, Belarus and Serbia.

Some of the systems included have foreign participation, some others are 100% European. The main participants in the systems are mentioned.

== Combat aircraft ==
=== Combat aircraft in production ===
Model	Variant	Origin	Type	Role	Notes
Jet fighters
Aero L-39 Skyfox	—	Czechia	Light combat fighter	Attack aircraft	
Aero L-159 ALCA	—	Czechia	Light combat fighter	Attack aircraft	
Aermacchi M-345	M-345 Dual role	Italy	Light combat fighter	Attack aircraft	
Alenia Aermacchi M-346	M-346 FA (Fighter Attack)	Italy	Light combat fighter	Multi-role fighter	
Alenia Aermacchi M-346	M-346FGA (Ground Attack)	Italy	Light combat fighter	Attack aircraft	
Dassault Rafale	Rafale C (1-seat), Tranches F3R, F4.1, F4.2	France	4++ gen fighter	Swing-role fighter	
Dassault Rafale	Rafale B (twin-seat), Tranches F3R, F4.1, F4.2	France	4++ gen fighter	Swing-role fighter	
Dassault Rafale	Rafale M (Marine), Tranche F4.2	France	4++ gen fighter, carrier-based / catapult	Swing-role fighter	
Eurofighter Typhoon	Tranche 3A	Germany / Italy / Spain / UK	4++ gen fighter	Swing-role fighter	
Saab JAS 39 Gripen	Gripen C (1-seat)	Sweden	4++ gen fighter	Swing-role fighter	
Saab JAS 39 Gripen	Gripen D (twin seat)	Sweden	4++ gen fighter	Swing-role fighter	
Saab JAS 39 Gripen	Gripen E (1-seat)	Sweden	4++ gen fighter	Swing-role fighter	
Saab JAS 39 Gripen	Gripen F (twin seat)	Sweden	4++ gen fighter	Swing-role fighter	
F-35 Lightning II	F-35A	Programme co-founders: USA / UK; Tier 2 partners: Italy / Netherlands; Tier 3 partners: Australia / Canada / Denmark / Norway / Turkey	5th gen fighter, land-based	Swing-role, fighter	
F-35 Lightning II	F-35B	Programme co-founders: USA / UK; Tier 2 partners: Italy / Netherlands; Tier 3 partners: Australia / Canada / Denmark / Norway / Turkey	5th gen fighter, carrier-based / STOVL	Swing-role, fighter	
F-35 Lightning II	F-35C	Programme co-founders: USA / UK; Tier 2 partners: Italy / Netherlands; Tier 3 partners: Australia / Canada / Denmark / Norway / Turkey	5th gen fighter, carrier-based / catapult	Swing-role, fighter	
Gunships
Alenia C-27J Spartan	MC-27J	Italy	Twin-engine turboprop	Gunship, C3-ISR	
CASA CN-235	AC-235	Spain	Twin-engine turboprop	Gunship	
EADS CASA C-295	AC-295	Spain	Twin-engine turboprop	Gunship	
EADS CASA C-295	C295 Armed / ISR	Spain	Twin-engine turboprop	CAS / ISR	

=== Combat aircraft in development ===
Model	Variant	Origin	Type	Role	Notes
Current aircraft modernised
Aero Vodochody F/A-259 Striker	—	Czechia / Israel / Ukraine	Light combat fighter	Multirole fighters	Development supported by IAI.
Dassault Rafale	Rafale C (1-seat), tranche F5	France	4++ gen fighter	Swing-role fighter, MUM-T (manned-unmanned teaming)	
Dassault Rafale	Rafale B (twin-seat), tranche F5	France	4++ gen fighter	Swing-role fighter, MUM-T (manned-unmanned teaming)	
Dassault Rafale	Rafale M (Marine), tranche F5	France	4++ gen fighter	Swing-role fighter, MUM-T (manned-unmanned teaming)	
Eurofighter Typhoon	Tranche 4	Germany / Italy / Spain / UK	4++ gen fighter	Swing-role fighter	
Eurofighter Typhoon	EK / ECR	Germany / Italy / Spain / UK	4++ gen fighter	Electronic warfare, SEAD / DEAD Suppression / Destruction of Enemy Air Defences)	
Eurofighter Typhoon	Tranche 4+ / 5	Germany / Italy / Spain / UK	4++ gen fighter	Swing-role fighter, MUM-T (manned-unmanned teaming)	
Future aircraft
GCAP Global Combat Air Programme	—	Italy / Japan / UK	6th gen fighter	Swing-role fighter, MUM-T (manned-unmanned teaming)	
SCAF Système de combat aérien du futur	—	Partners: France / Germany / Spain; Observer: Belgium	6th gen fighter	Swing-role fighter, MUM-T (manned-unmanned teaming)	
SCAF Système de combat aérien du futur	—	Partners: France / Germany / Spain; Observer: Belgium	6th gen fighter Carrier-based aircraft	Swing-role fighter, MUM-T (manned-unmanned teaming)	
Swedish future fighter concept	—	Sweden	6th gen fighter	Swing-role fighter, MUM-T (manned-unmanned teaming)	
Unmanned fighters
Dassault wingman	—	France	Stealthy UAV	Loyal wingman, MUM-T (manned-unmanned teaming)	, Based on the nEUROn
Airbus / Helsing wingman concept	—	Germany	Stealthy UAV	Loyal wingman MUM-T (manned-unmanned teaming)	

== Trainers fixed-wing aircraft ==
=== Trainers in production ===
Model	Variant	Origin	Type	Role	Notes
Ab initio
Diamond DA20 Katana	DA20-C1	Austria	Single-engine turboprop	Ab initio training	
Diamond DA40 Diamond Star	—	Austria	Single-engine turboprop	Ab initio training	
Grob G 115	—	Germany	Single-engine turboprop	Ab initio training	
Grob G 120	G 120A	Germany	Single-engine turboprop	Ab initio training	
Grob G 120	G 120TP	Germany	Single-engine turboprop	Ab initio training	
Sonaca 200	—	Belgium	Single-engine turboprop	Ab initio training	
Zlín Z 42	Zlín 242	Czechia	Single-engine turboprop	Ab initio training	
Zlín Z-143	Zlín 143 LSi	Czechia	Single-engine turboprop	Ab initio training	
Basic training
Aermacchi M-345	T345A	Italy	Light jet aircraft	Basic training	
Diamond DA42 Twin Star	—	Austria	Twin-engine turboprop	Basic training, (for multi-engine aircraft)	
Diamond DART	DART 450	Austria	Single-engine turboprop	Basic training	
Diamond DART	DART 550	Austria	Single-engine turboprop	Basic training	
Diamond DART	DART 750	Austria	Single-engine turboprop	Basic training	
Grob G 520	G 520NG	Germany	Single-engine turboprop	Basic training	
Pilatus PC-7	PC-7 WE	Switzerland	Single-engine turboprop	Basic training	
Pilatus PC-7	PC-7 MKX	Switzerland	Single-engine turboprop	Basic training	
Pipistrel Virus	—	Slovenia	Piston engine or electric	Basic training	
Advanced training
Aermacchi M-345	T345A	Italy	Light jet aircraft	Advanced training	
Aermacchi M-346 Master	—	Italy	Light jet aircraft	Advanced training	
Aero L-39 Skyfox	—	Czechia	Light jet aircraft	Advanced training	
Aero L-159 ALCA	—	Czechia	Light jet aircraft	Advanced training	
Piaggio P.180 Avanti	P.180 Avanti EVO+	Italy	Twin-engine turboprop	Advanced training, (for transport aircraft pilots)	
Pilatus PC-21	—	Switzerland	Single-engine turboprop	Advanced training	
Saab / Boeing T-7 Red Hawk	T7A	Sweden / USA	Light jet aircraft	Advanced training	
Aggressor / combat training
Aermacchi M-346 Master	—	Italy	Light jet aircraft	Aggressor	
Aero L-39 Skyfox	—	Czechia	Light jet aircraft	Aggressor	
Aero L-159 ALCA	—	Czechia	Light jet aircraft	Aggressor	
Saab JAS 39 Gripen	Gripen Aggressor	Sweden	Fighter training aircraft	Aggressor	

=== Trainers in development ===
Model	Variant	Origin	Type	Role	Notes
Advanced training
Aeralis	Aeralis Trainer single engine	UK	Light jet aircraft	Advanced training	
Aeralis	Aeralis Trainer twin engine	UK	Light jet aircraft	Advanced training	
Aggressor / combat training
Aeralis	Aeralis Aggressor	Germany	Light jet aircraft	Aggressor	

== Transport aircraft ==
=== Transport aircraft in production ===
Model	Variant	Origin	Type	Role	Notes
Strategic / tactical transport
Airbus A400M Atlas	—	Belgium / France / Germany / Italy / Luxembourg / Spain / Turkey / UK	Quad-engine turboprop	Strategic and tactical transport	
Alenia C-27J Spartan	C-27J Spartan NG	Italy	Twin-engine turboprop	Tactical transport	
Antonov An-132	—	Ukraine	Twin-engine turboprop	Tactical transport	
Antonov An-178	—	Ukraine	Twin-engine turboprop	Tactical transport	
CASA CN-235	CN-235-300	Spain	Twin-engine turboprop	Tactical transport	
EADS CASA C-295	C-295W	Spain	Twin-engine turboprop	Tactical transport	
Light transport aircraft
Britten-Norman BN-2 Islander	—	UK	Twin-engine turboprop	Light tactical transport / Paratroopers training	
Let L-410 Turbolet	L 410 NG	Czechia	Twin-engine turboprop	Light tactical transport / Paratroopers training	
PZL M28 Skytruck	—	Poland / Ukraine	Twin-engine turboprop	Light tactical transport / Paratroopers training	
Airliners / VIP transport
Airbus A319	A319CJ	France / Germany / UK	Twin-engine airliner	VIP transport / troops transport	
Airbus A321	A321-200	France / Germany / UK	Twin-engine airliner	VIP transport / troops transport	
Airbus A321	A321neo LR	France / Germany / UK	Twin-engine airliner	Troops transport / MEDEVAC	
Airbus A330	A330-200 MRTT	France / Germany / Spain / UK	Twin-engine airliner	Cargo transport / troops transport / MEDEVAC	
Airbus A350	ACJ350-900	France / Germany / UK	Twin-engine airliner	VIP transport / troops transport	
ATR 42	ATR 42-600	France / Italy	Twin-engine turboprop	VIP transport / troops transport	
ATR 72	ATR 72-600	France / Italy	Twin-engine turboprop	VIP transport / troops transport	
Dassault Falcon	Falcon 900 / 900EX / 900LX	France	Three-engine aircraft	VIP transport / troops transport	
Dassault Falcon	Falcon 2000EX / 2000LX / 2000LXS	France	Twin-engine aircraft	VIP transport	
Dassault Falcon	Falcon 6X	France	Twin-engine aircraft	VIP transport	
Dassault Falcon	Falcon 7X	France	Three-engine aircraft	VIP transport	
Dassault Falcon	Falcon 8X	France	Three-engine aircraft	VIP transport	
Piaggio P.180 Avanti	—	Italy	Twin-engine turboprop	VIP transport / troops transport	
Piaggio P.180 Avanti	P.180 Avanti EVO+	Italy	Twin-engine turboprop	VIP transport / troops transport	
Pilatus PC-12	PC-12NGX	Switzerland	Single-engine turboprop	VIP transport / troops transport	
Pilatus PC-24	—	Switzerland	Twin-engine aircraft	VIP transport	
SOCATA TBM	Multiple variants	France	Single-engine turboprop	VIP transport / troops transport	

=== Transport aircraft in development ===
Model	Variant	Origin	Type	Role	Notes
Strategic / tactical transport
FMTC; Future Mid-size Tactical Cargo	—	Programme developers: France / Germany / Poland / Spain; Industrial partners: Austria / Belgium / Finland / Greece / Italy / Romania / Sweden	Twin-engine turboprop	Tactical transport aircraft	FASETT programme
D328eco	—	Germany	Twin-engine turboprop	Tactical transport aircraft	
Light transport aircraft
LUS 222	—	Portugal	Twin-engine turboprop	Light tactical transport aircraft	

== Tankers aircraft ==
=== Tankers in production ===
Model	Variant	Origin	Type	Role	Notes
Airbus A330-200	A330 MRTT	France / Germany / Spain / UK	Twin-engine airliner	Aerial refueling	
Airbus A400M Atlas	—	Belgium / France / Germany / Italy / Luxembourg / Spain / Turkey / UK	Quad-engine turboprop	Aerial refueling	
EADS CASA C-295	KC-295	Spain	Twin-engine turboprop	Aerial refueling	
Dassault Rafale	Rafale M (Marine)	France	Jet fighter	Aerial refueling	

=== Tankers in development ===
Model	Variant	Origin	Type	Role	Notes
Airbus A330-800 neo	A330neo MRTT+	France / Germany / Spain / UK	Twin-engine airliner	Aerial refueling	
Aeralis	Aeralis Tanker	UK	Light jet aircraft	Aerial refueling	

== AEW&C aircraft ==
=== AEW&C aircraft in production ===
Model	Variant	Origin	Type	Role	Notes
Saab 2000	Saab Erieye AEW&C	Sweden	Twin-engine turboprop	AEW&C	
Bombardier Global 6000	Saab GlobalEye AEW&C	Canada / Sweden	Twin-engine aircraft	AEW&C	

=== AEW&C aircraft in development ===
Model	Variant	Origin	Type	Role	Notes
Airbus A321	A321-211 Netra Mk 2	France / Germany / UK / India	Twin-engine airliner	AEW&C	
EADS CASA C-295	C-295 AEW	Spain / Israel	Twin-engine turboprop	AEW&C	

== Maritime patrol and anti-submarine warfare aircraft ==
=== MPA / ASW aircraft in production ===
Model	Variant	Origin	Type	Role	Notes
Anti-submarine warfare
ATR 72	ATR 72-600 ASW	France / Italy	Twin-engine turboprop	ASuW, maritime patrol, ISR, SAR, C4 (command, control, communications, computers)	ATR 72-600 MAR with ASW capabilities added
EADS CASA C-295	C-295 ASW	Spain	Twin-engine turboprop	Maritime patrol / ASW / ASuW / ISR	
Maritime patrol aircraft
ATR 42	ATR 42MP	France / Italy	Twin-engine turboprop	Maritime patrol, ISR, SAR C2 (command and control)	
ATR 72	ATR 72-600 MAR / MPA	France / Italy	Twin-engine turboprop	Maritime patrol, ISR, SAR, C4 (command, control, communications, computers)	
Dassault Falcon	Falcon 2000LXS Albatros MPA	France	Twin-engine aircraft	Maritime patrol, ISR, SAR	
EADS CASA C-295	C-295 MPA	Spain	Twin-engine turboprop	Maritime patrol, ISR, SAR C2 (command and control)	
Other maritime aircraft types
Alenia C-27J Spartan	EADS HC-144 Ocean Sentry	Italy	Twin-engine turboprop	Maritime surveillance, SAR	
Alenia C-27J Spartan	HC-27J	Italy / USA	Twin-engine turboprop	Maritime surveillance, SAR	
CASA / IPTN CN-235	CN-235-220 MSA	Indonesia / Spain	Twin-engine turboprop	Maritime surveillance, ISR, SAR C2 (command and control)	
Dassault Falcon	Falcon 900 MSA	France	Three-engine aircraft	Maritime surveillance, SAR	
Dassault Falcon	Falcon 2000 MSA	France	Twin-engine aircraft	Maritime surveillance, SAR	
EADS CASA C-295	C-295 MSA	Spain	Twin-engine turboprop	Maritime surveillance, SAR	
EADS CASA C-295	C-295 SAR	Spain	Twin-engine turboprop	SAR	
Tecnam P2006T	P2006T MRI	Italy	Twin-engine turboprop	Maritime reconnaissance intelligence	
Vulcanair P.68	Observer 2	Italy	Twin-engine turboprop	Maritime observation and survaillance	

=== MPA / ASW aircraft in development ===
Model	Variant	Origin	Type	Role	Notes
Airbus A321neo	A321XLR MPA	France / Germany / UK	Twin-engine aircraft	Maritime patrol / ASW / ASuW / ISR / C4 (command, control, communications, computers)	
Global 6000	Saab Swordfish MPA	Sweden / Canada	Twin-engine aircraft	Maritime patrol / ASW / ASuW / ISR / C4 (command, control, communications, computers)	
Global 6500	Maritime MMA	Italy / Canada	Twin-engine aircraft	Maritime patrol / ASW / ASuW / ISR / C4 (command, control, communications, computers)	
Alenia C-27J	C-27J MPA	Italy / USA	Twin-engine turboprop	Maritime patrol / ASW / ASuW / ISR / C4 (command, control, communications, computers)	

== Electronic warfare aircraft ==
This section includes the SIGINT, ELINT, COMINT and electronic warfare aircraft.

=== Electronic warfare aircraft in production ===
Model	Variant	Origin	Type	Role	Notes
Alenia C-27J Spartan	EC-27 JEDI (jamming and electronic defence instrumentation)	Italy	Twin-engine turboprop	Electronic warfare	
Dassault Falcon	Falcon 2000/ Baekdu-I	France / South Korea	Twin-engine aircraft	ELINT	
Diamond DA42	DA42 MPP	Austria	Twin-engine turboprop	SIGINT / ELINT	
Diamond DA62	DA62 MPP	Austria	Twin-engine turboprop	SIGINT / ELINT	
SHARK	SHARK EW	Czechia / Slovakia	Sincle-engine turboprop	C-UAS Electronic warfare	

=== Electronic warfare aircraft in development ===
Model	Variant	Origin	Type	Role	Notes
Dassault Falcon	Falcon 8X Archange	France	Twin-engine aircraft	SIGINT / electronic warfare	Thales new-generation payload CUGE (universal electronic warfare capability)
Global 6000	Hensoldt Pegasus	Germany / Canada	Twin-engine aircraft	SIGINT and reconnaissance	
EADS CASA C-295	C-295 SIGINT	Spain	Twin-engine turboprop	SIGINT	

== Reconnaissance and surveillance aircraft ==
=== Reconnaissance and surveillance aircraft in production ===
Model	Variant	Origin	Type	Role	Notes
Airbus A319	A319OH	France / Germany / UK	Twin-engine airliner	Open Skies reconnaissance	
Diamond DA42	DA42 MPP	Austria	Twin-engine turboprop	ISR	
Diamond DA62	DA62 MPP	Austria	Twin-engine turboprop	ISR	
Dornier 228	General Atomics Do228 NXT	Germany	Twin-engine turboprop	ISR	
Let L-410 Turbolet	L-410 FG	Czechia	Twin-engine turboprop	ISR	
Pilatus PC-12	PC-12 NGX Spectre	Switzerland	Single-engine turboprop	ISR	
Pilatus PC-12	UH-28A Draco	Switzerland / USA	Single-engine turboprop	ISR	
Piaggio P.180 Avanti	P.180 Avanti EVO+	Italy	Twin-engine turboprop	ISR	
CASA CN-235	—	Spain	Twin-engine turboprop	ISR	

=== Reconnaissance and surveillance aircraft in development ===
Model	Variant	Origin	Type	Role	Notes
Aeralis	Aeralis ISTAR	UK	Light jet aircraft	Intelligence, surveillance, target acquisition, reconnaissance	
Dassault Falcon	Falcon 2000/LXS Baekdu-II	France / South Korea	Twin-engine aircraft	Intelligence, surveillance, reconnaissance	
D328eco	—	Germany	Twin-engine turboprop	Reconnaissance	

== See also ==
- List of weapon systems in production and in development by the European defence industry
  - List of land weapon systems in production and in development by the European defence industry
    - European indirect fire systems in production and in development
    - European tanks in production and in development
    - European armoured vehicles in production and in development
  - List of naval weapon systems in production and in development by the European defence industry
    - European naval weapons in production and in development
  - List of aerial weapon systems in production and in development by the European defence industry
    - European military rotorcraft in production and in development
    - List of military drones in production and in development by the European defence industry
    - European aircraft mechanical systems in production and in development
    - List of military aircraft electronic systems in production and in development by the European defence industry
    - European aircraft weapons in production and in development
    - List of air defence systems and radars in production and in development by the European defence industry
    - List of aerospace defence companies in Europe
