= M69 mortar =

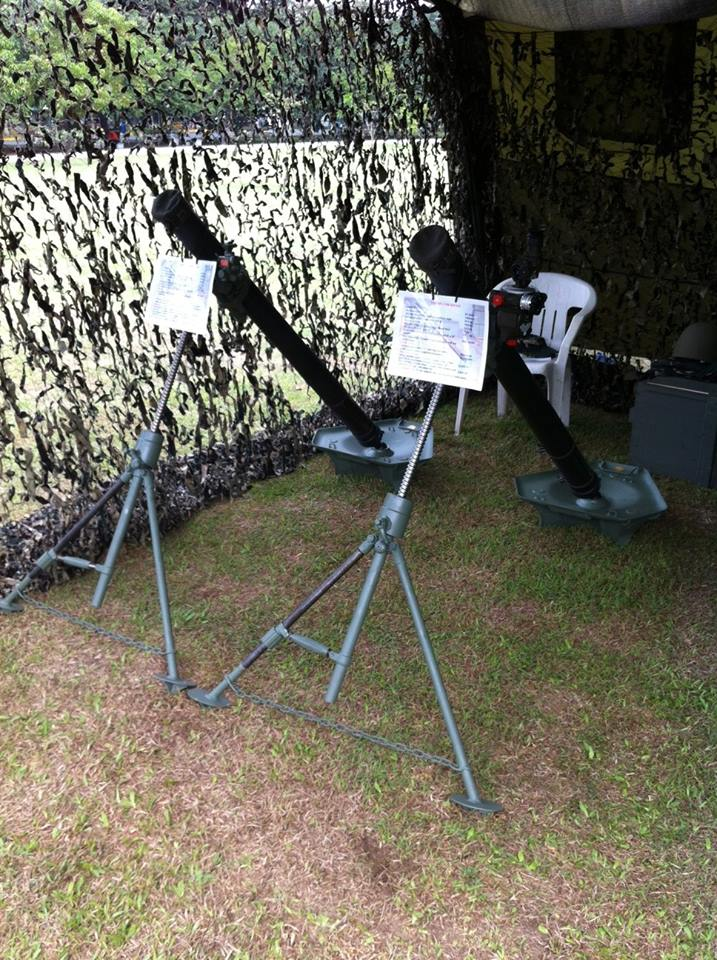
- M69B mortar M69B 81mm mortar of the Philippine Army
- Type: Mortar
- Place of origin: Yugoslavia

Production history
- Designer: Military Technical Institute

Specifications
- Mass: 47.1 kilograms (104 lb)
- Length: 1,324 millimetres (52.1 in)
- Crew: 4
- Caliber: M69/M96: 82 millimetres (3.2 in), M69B: 81 millimetres (3.2 in)
- Elevation: 45°–85°
- Traverse: 5.6°
- Rate of fire: 8–15 rpm sustained
- Maximum firing range: 4,943 metres (16,217 ft)
- Feed system: muzzle-loaded
- Sights: NSB-3

The M69 81 mm/82 mm medium weight mortar is a Yugoslavian-designed smooth bore, muzzle-loading, high-angle-of-fire weapon used for long-range indirect fire support to light infantry.

== Variants ==
- M69 & M69A - original variant in 82mm caliber
- M69B - NATO version using 81mm caliber
- M96 - improved version of the M69 in 82mm caliber

== Operators ==
- Afghanistan − M69 82mm mortar
- Armenia − M69 82mm mortar
- Bosnia and Herzegovina − M69 82mm mortar
- Croatia − M96 82mm mortar
- Iraq − M69A 82mm mortar
- Kosovo − M69 82mm mortar
- Malaysia − M69 81mm
- North Macedonia − M69 82mm mortar
- Philippines − M69B 81mm mortar
- Saudi Arabia − M69BK 81mm mortar
- Serbia − M69 and M69A 82mm mortars
- Slovenia − M69 82mm mortar
- Syria − M69A 82mm mortar
- Turkey − M69B 81mm mortar
- Ukraine − M69A 82mm mortar
- United Arab Emirates − M69A 82mm mortar

== See also ==
- Artillery
- Military technology and equipment
- List of artillery

== Bibliography ==
- International Institute for Strategic Studies (February 2023). The Military Balance 2023. Routledge, Chapman & Hall, Incorporated. ISBN 978-1-032-50895-5.
