= Escribano Mechanical & Engineering =

- Founder: Ángel Escribano
- Headquarters: Spain

Escribano Mechanical & Engineering is a Spanish armaments company founded by Ángel Escribano in 1989 having its headquarters in Alcalá de Henares.

== Description ==
The company is active in the aerospace and defense sectors.

== History ==
At the end of the 2010s the company began development and manufacturing of the turret of the VCR Dragón, an infantry fighting vehicle based on the Mowag Piranha V. In 2023, it acquired a 3% shareholding in Indra Sistemas.

== Products ==
=== Remote weapon systems ===
==== Land ====
- GUARDIAN ASPIS, 1.5, 2.0, L-HIT, and 30

==== Naval ====
- SENTINEL ASPIS, 1.5, 2.0, 20, and 30
- SENTINEL ROCKET

=== Electro-optical systems ===
- VTC DUAL
- APOLO
- OTEOS

=== Guidance systems ===
- Alkon Mortar 120
- Alkon Rocket 122
- Alkon 155

=== Robotic systems ===
- aunav.ROCS
- aunav.CID Light
- aunav.NEXT
- aunav.NEO HD

== Projects ==
- VAC (gun turret)
- SILAM (LRM)
- Dragon (gun turret)
- THeMIS, integration of its OTEOS electro-optical system on this land drone
- Sigilar program.
- C-295 Armed (Door Gun System electro-optical turret)

== See also ==
- Santa Bárbara Sistemas
