= Eurodrone =

European remotely piloted military aircraft system

European MALE RPAS
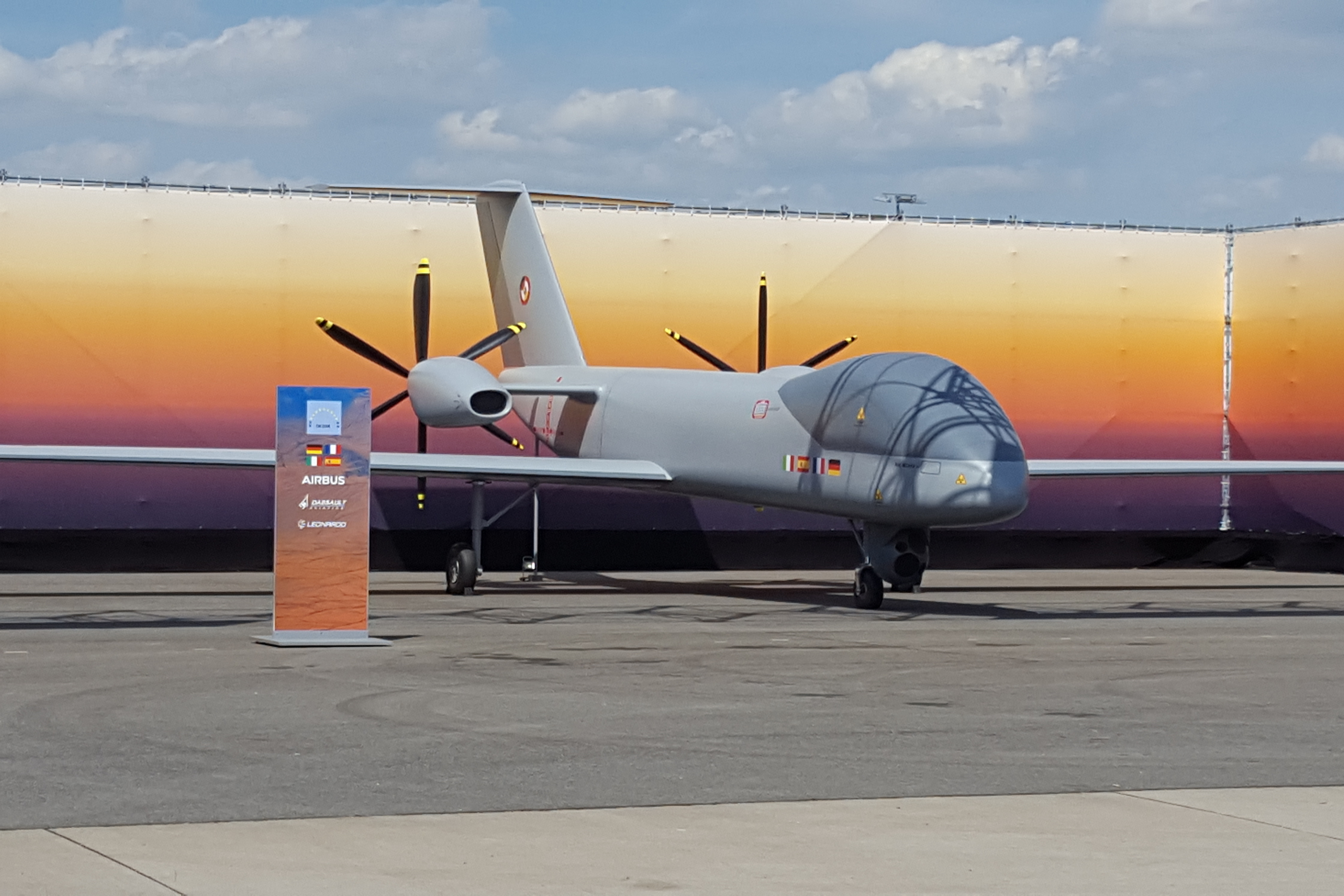

General information
- Type: Unmanned combat aerial vehicle
- National origin: Multinational
- Manufacturer: Airbus, Dassault Aviation, Leonardo S.p.A.
- Primary users: German Air Force: Italian Air Force; French Air and Space Force; Spanish Air Force

History
- Introduction date: expected 2028
- First flight: expected mid-2027

The European Medium Altitude Long Endurance Remotely Piloted Aircraft System (MALE RPAS), or Eurodrone, is a twin-turboprop MALE UAV under development by Airbus, Dassault Aviation and Leonardo with a first flight expected by mid-2027. Orders for the system have been placed by Germany, France, Italy and Spain.

== Development ==
On 18 May 2015, France, Germany and Italy launched a two-year European MALE RPAS study to define its operational capabilities, system requirements and preliminary design. Spain later joined the study. In November 2015, the program management was assigned to the European defence procurement agency OCCAR, with European Defence Agency support for air traffic integration and certification. The definition study was to be contracted in the first half of 2016, with potential development and production then aiming for a first delivery in 2025.

A two-year definition study was launched in September 2016. Airbus, Dassault Aviation and Leonardo unveiled a full-scale mock-up at the April 2018 ILA Berlin Air Show. In October 2018, OCCAR invited Airbus Defence and Space to submit a tender for the program, to coordinate the major sub-contractors, Dassault and Leonardo. In November 2018, the system preliminary design review was completed, allowing the stakeholders to align their requirements and contract in 2019.

In late May 2019, Airbus submitted its offer. In the summer, the French Senate criticised the platform as "too heavy, too expensive and therefore, too difficult to export" due to "German specifications". The first flight was then scheduled for 2024, with first deliveries planned for 2027.

Due to the impact of the COVID-19 pandemic on the aviation industry, contract signing slipped to 2021. The Airbus site at Manching was selected for final assembly and ground testing. The maiden flight was then scheduled for 2025, with first deliveries planned for 2028. The contract is for 20 Eurodrone systems, each of which includes three aircraft, resulting in a total of 60 drones.

In February 2022, the development and production contract was approved. The prototype first flight is now expected by mid-2027. In March 2022, Airbus Defence and Space confirmed the selection of the General Electric Catalyst turboprop engine over the Safran Ardiden 3TP.

== Design ==
The Eurodrone is intended for long-endurance intelligence, surveillance and reconnaissance and ground support missions with precision-guided weapons. The twin-turboprops are mounted in a pusher configuration behind the wing, similar to the smaller BAE Systems Mantis, and one-third larger than the MQ-9.

The drone's dual engines were a demand of Germany, which intended to use the UAV for surveillance over domestic urban areas and was concerned that an engine failure in a single-engine drone could lead to the drone crashing into a house. France, which intends to use the system over conflict zones such as the Sahel, has been critical of its cost and weight. At 11,000 kg (24,000 lb), it is over twice as heavy as an MQ-9 Reaper. A French politician overseeing the RPAS project, Christian Cambon, criticized it as suffering from "obesity."

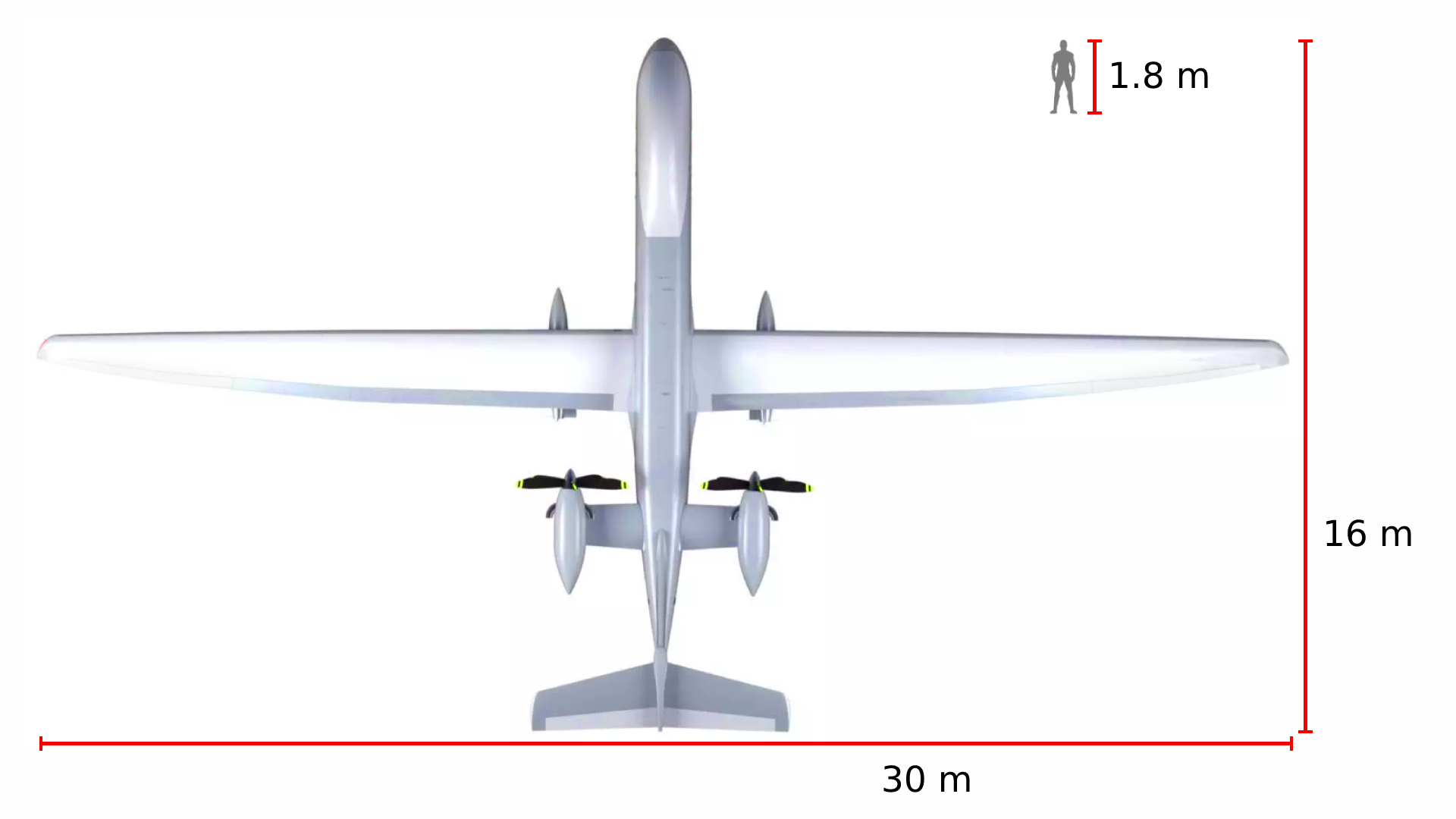
The dimensions of the Eurodrone

== Operators ==
=== Future operators ===
France

- French Air and Space Force - 12 drones (4 systems) on contract

Germany

- German Air Force - 21 drones (7 systems) on contract

Italy

- Italian Air Force - 15 drones (5 systems) on contract

Spain

- Spanish Air Force - 12 drones (4 systems) on contract

=== Potential operators ===
Japan

On 30 November 2023, Japan joined the Eurodrone programme as an observer.

India

On 21 January 2025, India joined the Eurodrone programme as an observer.

== Specifications ==
General characteristics

- Capacity: 2,300 kg (5,070 lb) payload
- Length: 16 m (52 ft 6 in)
- Wingspan: 26 m (85 ft 4 in)
- Height: 6 m (19 ft 8 in)
- Max takeoff weight: 13,000 kg (28,660 lb)
- Powerplant: 2 × General Electric Catalyst turboprop
- Propellers: MT-Propeller

Performance

- Maximum speed: 500 km/h (310 mph, 270 kn)
- Endurance: up to 40h
- Service ceiling: 12,000 m (40,000 ft)

Armament

- Hardpoints: 5 with a capacity of up to 650 kg (IB) and 375 kg (OB/centre)
- Missiles: Akeron LP, Brimstone
- Bombs: GBU-49 Enhanced Paveway II

Avionics

- Radar: Leonardo Gabbiano AESA
- FLIR: Safran Euroflir 610 electro-optical and infrared sensor
- Data link: wide band LoS Ku data link (Hensoldt and Sener)

== See also ==
- Unmanned aerial vehicle

Aircraft of comparable role, configuration, and era

- BAE Systems Mantis
- EADS Talarion
- General Atomics MQ-9 Reaper
- Piaggio Hammerhead
- Aarok
- Bayraktar Akıncı
- TAI Aksungur

Related lists

- List of unmanned aerial vehicles
