= List of tanks in production and in development by the European defence industry =

This list of tanks in production and in development by the European defence industry aims at summarising the current status of the land defence industry in Europe. This list focuses on the Western European military block industry, and excludes Russia, Belarus and Serbia. The systems mentioned are at least partially European.

== Main battle tanks ==
=== Main battle tanks in production ===
Model	Manufacturer	Origin	Base vehicle	Gun	Gun calibre	Clients	Notes
New tanks
Leopard 2A7A1	KNDS Deutschland	Germany	Leopard 2	Rheinmetall Rh120 L55A1	120 mm L/55	German Army	
Leopard 2A8	KNDS Deutschland	Germany	Leopard 2	Rheinmetall Rh120 L55A1	120 mm L/55	German Army; Lithuanian Army; Netherlands Army; Norwegian Army; Swedish Army	
Modernisation
Ariete C2	CIO (Iveco, OTO Melara)	Italy	Ariete	Leonardo 120/44	120 mm L/44	Italian Army	
Challenger 3	RBSL (Rheinmetall UK and Germany, BAE Systems Land)	United Kingdom Germany	Challenger 2	Rheinmetall Rh120 L55A1	120 mm L/55	British Army	
Leclerc XLR	KNDS France	France	Leclerc	GIAT CN120-26	120 mm L/52	French Army	
Leopard 2PL M1	ZM Bumar-Łabędy	Poland	Leopard 2A4	Rheinmetall Rh-120 L44	120 mm L/44	Polish Army	Polish modernisation
Stridsvagn 123A	KNDS Deutschland	Sweden Germany	Leopard 2	Rheinmetall Rh120 L55A1	120 mm L/55	Swedish Army	

=== Main battle tanks in development ===
This list includes the MBT in development and also the MBT that are available for sale.

Model	Manufacturer	Origin	Base vehicle	Gun (gun calibre)	Gun calibre	Clients	Notes
New tanks
CAPINT	KNDS Deutschland KNDS France	Germany France	Leopard 2	ASCALON 120	120 mm L/55	—	
CAPINT	KNDS Deutschland KNDS France	Germany France	Leopard 2	ASCALON 140	140 mm L/48	—	
E-MBT ADT140 "Euro main battle tanks - ASCALON demonstrator turret"	KNDS Deutschland KNDS France	Germany France	Leopard 2	ASCALON 140	140 mm L/48	—	
MGCS "Main Ground Combat System"	MGCS Project Company GMBh (KNDS Deutschland, KNDS France, Rheinmetall, Thales Group)	Germany France	—	ASCALON 140	140 mm L/48	—	
MGCS "Main Ground Combat System"	MGCS Project Company GMBh (KNDS Deutschland, KNDS France, Rheinmetall, Thales Group)	Germany France	—	Rheinmetall Rh130 L51	130 mm L/51	—	
Leclerc Evolution	KNDS France	France	Leclerc	ASCALON 120	120 mm L/55	—	
Leopard 2 A-RC 3.0	KNDS Deutschland	Germany	Leopard 2	ASCALON 120	120 mm L/55	—	
Leopard 2 A-RC 3.0	KNDS Deutschland	Germany	Leopard 2	ASCALON 140	140 mm L/48	—	
Leopard 2 A-RC 3.0	KNDS Deutschland	Germany	Leopard 2	Rheinmetall Rh120 L44, L55, or L55A1 (120 mm L/44 or L/55)	120 mm L/44 or L/55	—	
Leopard 2 A-RC 3.0	KNDS Deutschland	Germany	Leopard 2	Rheinmetall Rh130 L51	130 mm L/51	—	
Leopard 2AX / Leopard 3	KNDS Deutschland	Germany	Leopard 2	Rheinmetall Rh130 L51	130 mm L/51	—	
Panther Evolution Upgrade	Rheinmetall	Germany	Leopard 2A4	Rheinmetall Rh120 L55A1	120 mm L/55	—	Panther KF51 turret (for Leopard 2A4 chassis)
Panther Evolution Upgrade	Rheinmetall	Germany	Leopard 2A4	Rheinmetall Rh130 L52	130 mm L/52	—	Panther KF51 turret (for Leopard 2A4 chassis)
Panther KF51	Rheinmetall	Germany	Leopard 2A4	Rheinmetall Rh130 L52	130 mm L/52	—	
Panther KF51 EVO	Rheinmetall N7 Leonardo	Germany Hungary Italy	Leopard 2A4	Rheinmetall Rh120 L55A1	120 mm L/55	—	
Modernisation
Leopard 1A5 - C3105	John Cockerill	BelgiumGermany	Leopard 1	Cockerill 105 HP Gun	105 mm L/53	—	Belgian modernisation available
Leopard 1A5 - Hitfact Mk2	Leonardo (former OTO Melara)	Italy Germany	Leopard 1	Leonardo 105/52	105 mm L/52	—	Italian offer for Greece
Leopard 1A5 - Hitfact Mk2	Leonardo (former OTO Melara)	Italy Germany	Leopard 1	Leonardo 120/45	120 mm L/45	—	Italian offer for Greece

== Fire support vehicle ==
=== Fire support vehicles in production ===
Model	Manufacturer	Origin	Base vehicle	Turret	Gun	Gun calibre	Clients	Notes
Medium and light tanks
KAPLAN Medium Tank	FNSS Defence PT Pindad CMI Defence	Turkey Indonesia Belgium	KAPLAN MT	Cockerill 3105	Cockerill 105 HP Gun	105 mm L/53	Indonesian Army	
Sabrah light tank - ASCOD 2	Elbit Systems GDELS Austria Tatra	Israel Austria Czechia	ASCOD 2	Elbit 105	Elbit Systems Land 105/52	105 mm L/52	Philippine Army	
Zorawar	Larsen & Toubro John Cockerill	India Belgium	Zorawar	Cockerill 3105	Cockerill 105 HP Gun	105 mm L/53	Indian Army	
Wheeled fire support vehicles
Centauro II	CIO (Iveco, OTO Melara)	Italy	Centauro	Hitfact Mlk2	Leonardo 105/52	105 mm L/52	—	
Centauro II	CIO (Iveco, OTO Melara)	Italy	Centauro	Hitfact Mlk2	Leonardo 120/45	120 mm L/45	Brazilian Army Italian Army	
LAV 700 AG	GDLS Canada John Cockerill	Canada Belgium	LAV 700	Cockerill 3105	Cockerill 105 HP Gun	105 mm L/53	Saudi Arabia National Guard	
Sabrah light tank - Pandur II	Elbit Systems GDELS SBS GDELS Austria	Israel Spain Austria	Pandur II (8×8)	Elbit 105	Elbit Systems Land 105/52	105 mmL/52	Philippine Army	

=== Fire support vehicles in development ===
This list includes the FSV in development and also the FSV that are available for sale.

Model	Manufacturer	Origin	Base vehicle	Turret	Gun	Gun calibre	Clients	Notes
Medium and light tanks
Boxer tracked RCT120	KNDS Deutschland	Germany	Boxer (tracked Mk1)	RCT120 (unmanned)	Rheinmetall Rh-120 L44	120 mm L/44	—	
CV90	BAE Systems AB John Cockerill	Sweden Belgium	CV90 Mk III	Cockerill 3105	Cockerill 105 HP Gun	105 mm L/53	—	
CV90	BAE Systems AB Rheinmetall	Sweden Germany	CV90 Mk III	—	Rheinmetall Rh120 LLR/47 "Light Low Recoil"	120 mm L/47	—	
CV90	BAE Systems AB RUAG	Sweden Switzerland	CV90 Mk III	—	RUAG CTG "Compact Tank Gun"	120 mm L/50	—	
Hunter light tank	ST Engineering CMI Defence	Singapore Belgium	Hunter AFV	Cockerill 3105	Cockerill 105 HP Gun	105 mm L/53	—	
K21-105 Light tank	Hanwha CMI Defence	South Korea Belgium	K21	Cockerill 3105	Cockerill 105 HP Gun	105 mm L/53	—	
Lynx FSV 120	Rheinmetall	Germany	Lynx KF41	Panther KF51 turret	Rheinmetall Rh-120 L44	120 mm L/44	—	
Lynx FSV - Hitfact	Rheinmetall Leonardo	Germany Italy	Lynx KF41	Hitfact Mk II	Leonardo 105/52	105 mm L/52	—	Variant for the Italian Army.
Lynx FSV - Hitfact	Rheinmetall Leonardo	Germany Italy	Lynx KF41	Hitfact Mk II	Leonardo 120/45	120 mm L/45	Italian Army	Variant for the Italian Army.
Otokar Tulpar light tank	Otokar CMI Defence	Turkey Belgium	Otokar Tulpar	Cockerill 3105	Cockerill 105 HP Gun	105 mm L/53	—	
Otokar Tulpar light tank	Otokar Leonardo	Turkey Italy	Otokar Tulpar	Hitfact Mk2	Leonardo 120/45	120 mm L/45	—	
Wheeled fire support vehicles
Boxer CMI 105	ARTEC GmbH CMI Defence	Germany Belgium	Boxer A3	Cockerill 3105	Cockerill 105 HP Gun	105 mm L/53	—	
KTO Rosomak	Patria CMI Defence	Finland Poland Belgium	KTO Rosomak	Cockerill 3105	Cockerill 105 HP Gun	105 mm L/53	—	
KTO Rosomak	Patria PGZ CMI Defence	Finland Poland Belgium	KTO Rosomak	Cockerill XC-8	Cockerill 120 HP Gun	120 mm	—	
Piranha V	Mowag CMI Defence	Switzerland Belgium	Piranha V	Cockerill XC-8	Cockerill 120 HP Gun	120 mm	—	

== Tank guns ==
=== Tank guns in production ===
Model	Variant	Manufacturer	Origin	Turret / Gun type (calibre)	Currently used with	Notes
2A46	—	ZTS – ŠPECIÁL	Slovakia	— / Smoothbore (125 mm L/48)	T-72 (several variants)	Barrel production / refurbishment.
2A46	2A46MS	ZTS – ŠPECIÁL	Slovakia	— / Smoothbore (125 mm L/48)	PT-91M2	Barrel production / refurbishment.
CN120-26 Modèle F1	—	EFAB de Bourges (design) KNDS France (production)	France	— / Smoothbore (120 mm L/52)	Leclerc Leclerc XLR	
CT-CV 105HP	—	CMI Defence	Belgium	Cockerill 3105 / Rifled (105 mm L/50)		
D10	—	ZTS – ŠPECIÁL	Slovakia	— / Rifled (100 mm L/53.5)	T-54 / T-55	Barrel production / refurbishment.
Leonardo 105/52	—	Leonardo (Formerly OTO Breda)	Italy	HITFACT Mk I / Mk II Rifled, low-recoil (105 mm L/52)	Centauro II OF-40	
Leonardo 120/44	—	Leonardo (Formerly OTO Breda)	Italy	— / Smoothbore (120 mm L/44)	Ariete	
Leonardo 120/45	—	Leonardo (Formerly OTO Breda)	Italy	HITFACT Mk II Smoothbore, low-recoil (105 mm L/52)	Centauro II	
Rh120	Rh120 L44	Rheinmetall (designer and manufacturer)	Germany	— / Smoothbore (120 mm L/44)	Leopard 2A4 Leopard 2A5 Stridsvagn 122 Boxer RCT120	
Rh120	Rh120 L44	HSW (licence production of barrels)	Germany Poland	— / Smoothbore (120 mm L/44)	Leopard 2PL	
Rh120	JSW 120mm	Japan Steel Works (licence production of barrels)	Germany Japan	— / Smoothbore (120 mm L/44)	Type 90	
Rh120	M256	Watervliet Arsenal (licence production of barrels)	Germany United States	— / Smoothbore (120 mm L/44)	M1A1 AbramsM1A2 Abrams M60-2000 M60A3 SLEP	
Rh120	KM256	Poongsan Corporation (licence production of barrels)	Germany South Korea	— / Smoothbore (120 mm L/44)	K1A1 K1A2	
Rh120	Rh120 L55	Rheinmetall (designer and manufacturer)	Germany	— / Smoothbore (120 mm L/55)	Leopard 2A6 Leopard 2A7	
Rh120	Rh120 L55	GDELS SBS (licence production)	: Spain	— / Smoothbore (120 mm L/55)	Leopard 2E	
Rh120	Rh120 L55A1	Rheinmetall (designer and manufacturer)	: Germany	— / Smoothbore (120 mm L/55)	Leopard 2A7V Leopard 2A7+ Leopard 2A8 Stridsvagn 123 Panther KF51 EVO	
Rh120	Rh120 L55A1	Rheinmetall (foreign production of barrels)	United Kingdom	— / Smoothbore (120 mm L/55)	Challenger 3	For 2027

=== Tank guns in development ===
This list includes the tank guns in development and also the tank guns that are available for sale.

Model	Variant	Manufacturer	Origin	Turret / Gun type (calibre)	Intended and/or demonstrator platforms	Notes
ASCALON 120	—	KNDS France	France	— / Smoothbore (120 mm L/58)	Leclerc Evolution Leopard 2 A-RC 3.0	
ASCALON 140	—	KNDS France	France	— / Smoothbore (140 mm L/48)	E-MBT ADT140 MGCS Leopard 2 A-RC 3.0	
CTG "Compact Tank Gun"	—	RUAG	Switzerland	— / Smoothbore (120 mm L/52)	CV90120-T	
Leonardo 120 L/55	—	Leonardo	Italy	Hitfact MkII/ Smoothbore (120 mm L/55)	Panther-IT KF51 Ariete C2 Lynx KF41	
Rh120	Rh120 LLR L47 Light-Low Recoil	Rheinmetall	Germany	— / Smoothbore (120 mm L/47)	CV90120-T	
Rh130	Rh130 L51	Rheinmetall (designer and manufacturer)	: Germany	— / Smoothbore (130 mm L/51, barrel of 6630 mm)	MGCS Leopard 2 A-RC 3.0	
Rh130	Rh130 L52 FGS "Future Gun System"	Rheinmetall (designer and manufacturer)	: Germany	— / Smoothbore (130 mm L/52, barrel of 6760 mm)	Panther KF51 Leopard 2A4 with Panther Evolution Upgrade turret	

== See also ==
- List of weapon systems in production and in development by the European defence industry
  - List of land weapon systems in production and in development by the European defence industry
    - European indirect fire systems in production / development
    - European armoured vehicles in production / development
  - List of naval weapon systems in production and in development by the European defence industry
    - European naval weapons in production and in development
  - List of aerial weapon systems in production and in development by the European defence industry
    - European military fixed wing aircraft in production / development
    - European military rotorcraft in production / development
    - List of military drones in production and in development by the European defence industry
    - European military aircraft mechanical systems in production / development
    - List of military aircraft electronic systems in production and in development by the European defence industry
    - European aircraft weapons in production / development
    - List of air defence systems and radars in production and in development by the European defence industry
    - List of aerospace defence companies in Europe
