= ASCALON (tank gun) =

French tank gun

- Type: Smoothbore tank gun
- Place of origin: France

Production history
- Designer: Nexter
- Designed: 2021–present
- Manufacturer: Nexter Systems

Specifications
- Mass: 3500 kg
- Length: 7.3 m (23 ft 11 in)
- Barrel length: 7 m (23 ft 0 in) or 50 calibers
- Shell: 140 mm telescoped or 120×570mm NATO
- Calibre: 140 mm or 120 mm
- Action: automatic vertical sliding-wedge breech
- Breech: vertical sliding-wedge
- Traverse: 360°
- Muzzle velocity: 1750 m/s (APFSDS)
- Feed system: autoloader

The Autoloaded and SCALable Outperforming guN or ASCALON is a French smoothbore 140 mm tank gun of 50 calibers designed by Nexter. This gun is currently mounted on the latest prototype of the EMBT, the Leclerc Evolution prototype and is proposed for the MGCS project.

== History ==
ASCALON origins date back to the FTMA (Future Tank Main Armament) NATO programme, a joint venture formed in 1988 by then GIAT Industries, Royal Ordnance Factories and Rheinmetall. The Watervliet Arsenal joined them in 1997 and the joint venture was renamed the RGR Armament GmbH group. The outcome of this collaboration was the creation of the NATO-standard 140 mm two-piece ammunition designed to succeed the 120×570mm NATO. The French, for their part, funded the construction of a lengthened Leclerc turret armed with a 140 mm smoothbore gun. The T4 turret was unveiled in 1996. In September 2016, the T4 turret was mounted on a former Leclerc MARS recovery vehicle and christened with the name of Terminateur (Terminator). Firing trials of Terminateur were conducted by Nexter Systems and the DGA in summer 2018 at the firing range of Alcochete. The 140 mm gun was modified to use new, one-piece telescoped ammunition. In April 2021, Nexter unveiled a modified version of its 140 mm weapon system under the acronym ASCALON and the gun was later displayed at the 2022 edition of Eurosatory. In May 2024, firing trials demonstrated that the 140 mm gun tube can be replaced by a 120 mm gun tube in less than an hour.

== Description ==
The ASCALON has been designed to be integrated into an armoured vehicle with a combat mass of less than 55 tonnes. The barrel is covered by a faceted thermal sleeve and to reduce the recoil effort, the gun is fitted with a pepperpot muzzle brake. The 140 mm APFSDS is 1.3 meters long and weighs around 30–35 kg. The muzzle energy on target, at 2000 m, is 10 MJ with a growth potential up to 13 MJ. A 140 mm NLOS sub-caliber guided ammunition has also been developed.

== See also ==
- XM291 – (United States)
- Rh-130 – (Germany)
