= Panther KF51 =

German Main Battle Tank

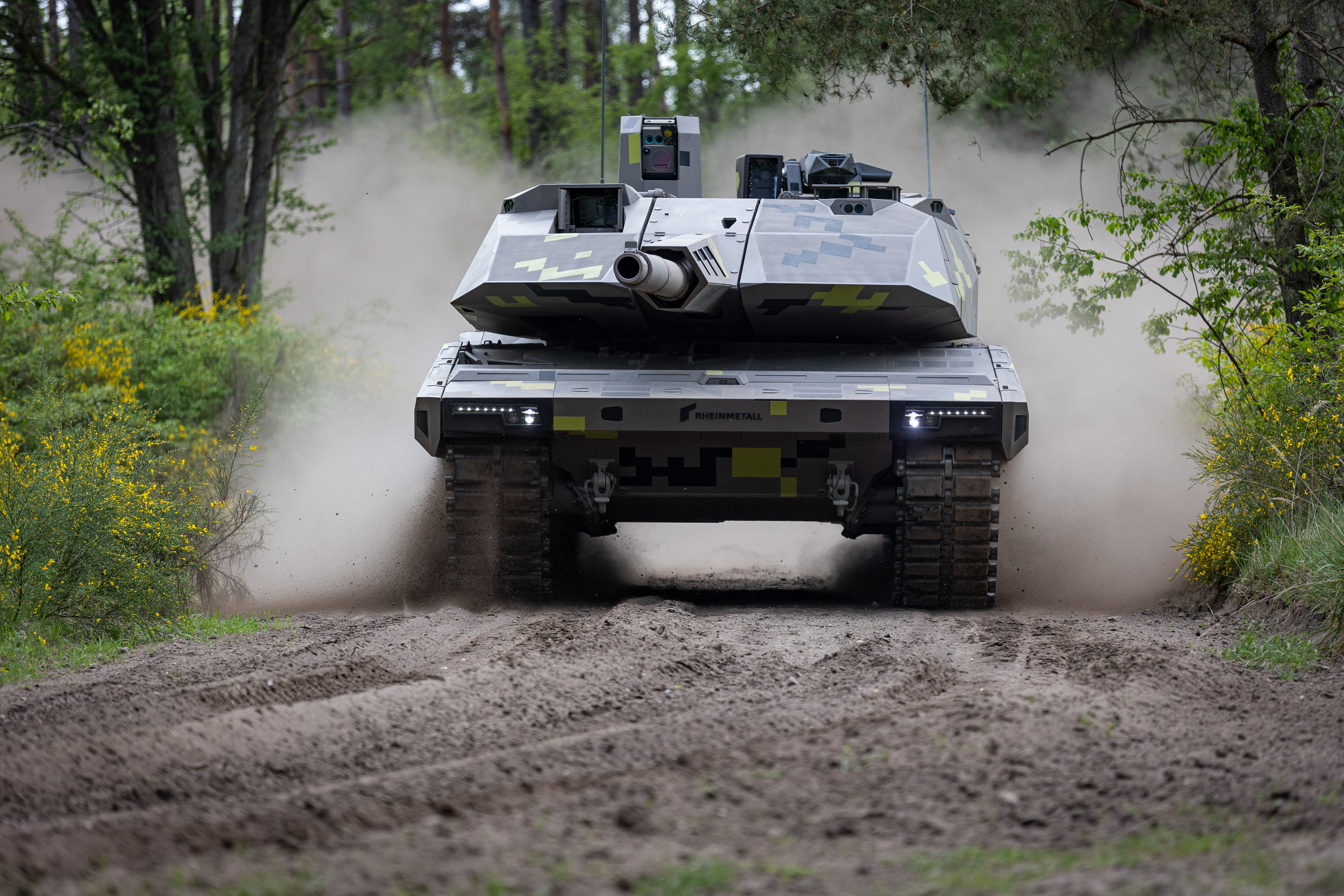
- Rheinmetall Panther KF51
- Type: Main battle tank
- Place of origin: Germany

Service history
- In service: Not yet in service

Production history
- Designer: Rheinmetall
- Designed: Commenced 2016

Specifications (Hull)
- Mass: approx. 65 tonnes (64 long tons; 72 short tons)
- Length: approx. 11 m with tank gun
- Width: approx. 3.8 m
- Height: 3.2 m (overall)
- Crew: 3–4: Commander (turret); Gunner (turret); Driver (hull); Optional: special operator (hull)
- Armour: Composite armour, StrikeShield based active protection system and sensor-fused reactive armour
- Main armament: Rh-130 L/52 130 mm Future Gun System smoothbore cannon (20 rounds in autoloader)
- Secondary armament: 7.62 mm or 12.7 mm coaxial machine gun RCWS or MSSA with 7.62 mm, 12.7 mm or 40 mm weapon
- Engine: To be determined, power pack either from mtu or Iveco

The Panther KF51 (KF is short for German "Kettenfahrzeug" lit. 'tracked vehicle') is a German main battle tank (MBT) that is under development by Rheinmetall. It was unveiled publicly at the Eurosatory defence exhibition on 13 June 2022. Different variants of the Panther KF51 are being co-developed by Rheinmetall with N7 in Hungary and Leonardo in Italy.

The KF51 is based on the hull of the Leopard 2A4, but with a new turret mounting an autoloaded 130 mm main gun. On 5 December 2022, Rheinmetall announced its plans to target mostly existing Leopard 2 operators with the KF51.

== Development ==
Rheinmetall began the development of major subsystems for the Panther in 2016, with system-level design commencing in 2018. The Panther was developed as a private venture by Rheinmetall to demonstrate by 2026 the potential for increasing the lethality, mobility, survivability, and networking capabilities of MBTs without incurring a significant increase in weight. To reduce the weight of the Leopard 2A4 platform on which the development vehicle was based, Rheinmetall prioritised active over passive protection.

Further developments under consideration for the vehicle include measures to make it more environmentally friendly during peacetime operations; the installation of a more powerful and more efficient engine; the integration of AI into the fire control system for automated target detection and identification; mounting an unmanned turret on the vehicle; and the creation of an unmanned version of the Panther. Efforts to make the tank more environmentally friendly could result in an alternative hull being developed for the Panther.

In August 2023, Viktor Orban announced in a TikTok video that the Hungarian government would join in the development of the KF51. He stated, "We are producing Lynxes, purchasing Leopards, and participating in the development of the Panther." According to some news agencies, the Hungarian government was planning to invest €300 million into the development and production of the KF51 Panther tank. According to Armin Papperger, the CEO of Rheinmetall AG, the development contract was signed with the Hungarian government in early September 2023, with production of the KF51 Panther possibly planned in the newly constructed Rheinmetall factory in Zalaegerszeg.

On 9 October 2025, Rheinmetall announced that the Hungarian Investment Promotion Agency would invest €1.4 million in the company's Zalaegerszeg facility. The money would be used to increase production and development capacity for the KF41 Lynx and KF51 Panther.

== Concept and design ==
The current KF51 demonstrator is based on the hull of the Leopard 2A4 and thus has a conventional MBT layout, with the driver at the front, the turret in the middle and the engine at the rear. The driver is seated in the front right of the hull and is provided with a single-piece hatch above their position in the roof of the glacis plate. A separate crew station can be provided in the left front of the hull for either a dedicated systems operator or a unit commander. Colour cameras for the driver are installed in the centre of the front and rear of the hull.

The Panther provides all crew members except the gunner with standardized crew stations, each featuring a large central 23-inch display screen and two smaller 10-inch displays below that. Two further screens are mounted to the left and right of the operator respectively, displaying the view from the left and right situational awareness cameras. Due to the demonstrator turret utilizing a version of the Leopard 2's EMES 15 gunner's sight, the gunner's place is slightly different. The use of standardized crew stations and drive-by-wire technology means that every crew member can take over every role, e.g. in theory the tank can also be driven by the commander and the gun can be fired by the driver.

Where the design of the KF51 departs from that of the preceding generation of most Western MBTs is by the introduction of a new two-person turret fitted with an autoloaded main gun. The rear of the turret houses the magazines for the main gun's automatic loader and pods for loitering munitions if these have been equipped. There are housings for cameras on all four corners of the turret and in the middle of each side of the turret.

The Panther is not intended to be a competitor to the Main Ground Combat System (MGCS) but meant to bridge the gap until the MGCS becomes available Being designed to be more affordable, Rheinmetall also believes that it will find a market besides the MGCS. Should the KF51 enter production, a new hull would be designed by Rheinmetall. Meanwhile, the Panther turret can be fitted onto a Leopard 2 tank as upgrade option.

=== Hull and mobility ===
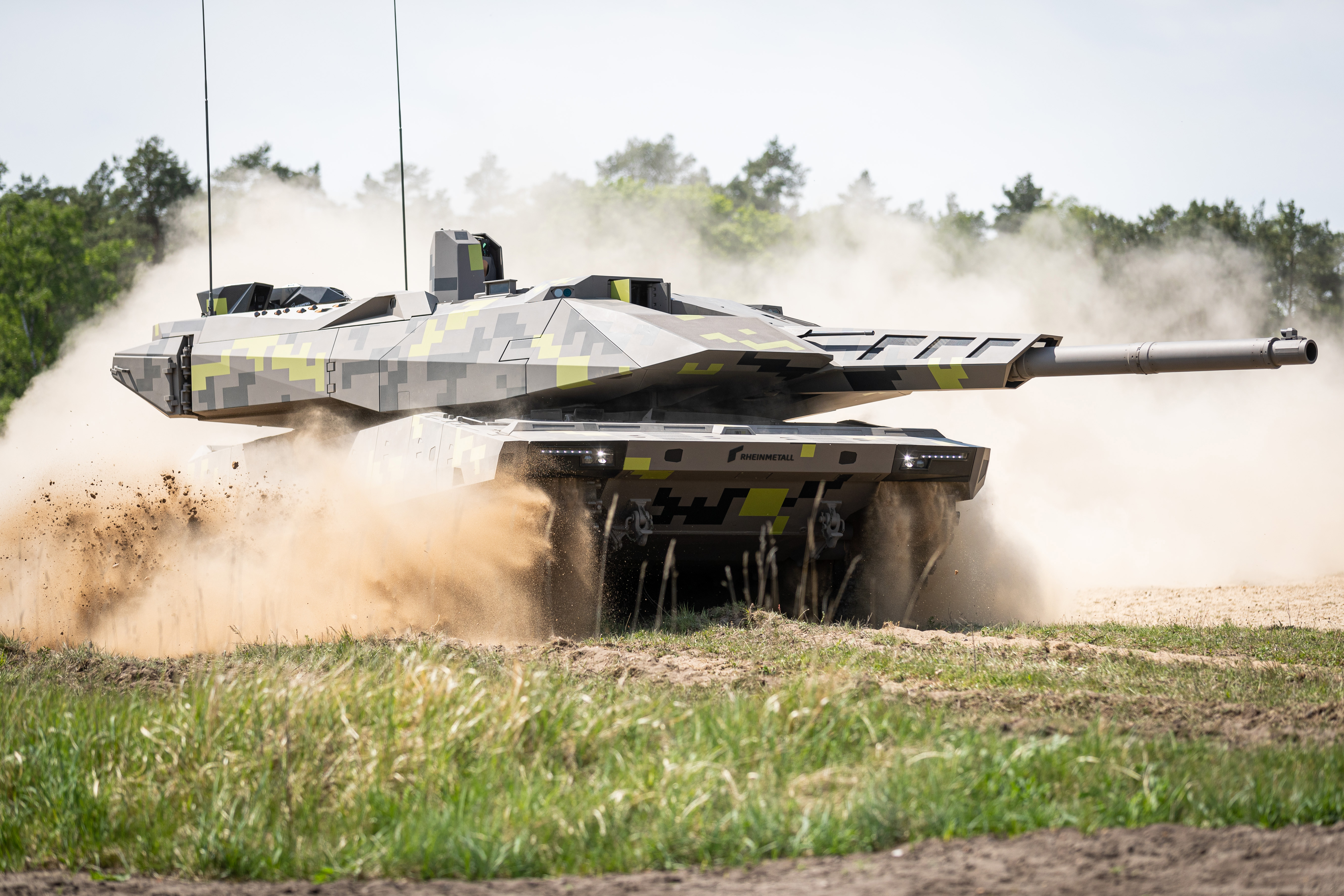
The Rheinmetall Panther KF51

The current KF51 demonstrator is based on the hull of the Leopard 2A4 and thus has a conventional MBT layout, with the driver at the front, the turret in the middle and the engine at the rear. The driver is seated in the front right of the hull and is provided with a single-piece hatch above their position in the roof of the glacis plate. A separate crew station can be provided in the left front of the hull for either a dedicated systems operator or a unit commander. Colour cameras for the driver are installed in the centre of the front and rear of the hull.

The engine, tracks and most of the running gear of the vehicle are also believed to have been derived from those of the Leopard 2. The Leopard 2's engine is an MTU MB 873 Ka-501 water-cooled V12 diesel engine producing 1,100 kilowatts (1,500 hp) at 2,600 rpm, coupled to a Renk HSWL 354 four-speed automatic transmission. The running gear of Leopard 2A4 consists of seven dual-tired rubber road wheels and four rubber-tired offset track return rollers on each side, with the idler at the front and the drive sprocket at the rear. The road wheels are supported by torsion bar suspension with advanced friction dampers. The first, second, third, sixth, and seventh road wheels feature advanced friction dampers and hydraulic bump stops to dampen oscillations, with the fourth and fifth fitted with solid bump stops. The KF51 is fitted with an 82-link Defence Service Tracks 570F track of 635 mm width with rubber-bushed end connectors on each side.

The KF51 Panther uses a Leopard 2 hull structure, running gear and power pack, to make the switch from Leopard 2 easier. At a weight of 59 tons, the Panther has a top speed of 70 kilometres per hour (43 mph) forward and 30 kilometres per hour (19 mph) backward. It can accelerate from 0 to 40 kilometres per hour (25 mph) in 8 seconds. It has a maximum range of 500 km. The Panther has a combat weight of 59 tonnes, making it lighter than most Western MBTs. Due to its lower weight and physical size, the KF51 Panther fits within the railroad tunnel profile AmovP-4l.

The production variants of the Panther will utilize new hull designed by Rheinmetall. For the Hungarian Panther EVO variant, it was announced that the new hull would be derived from the Bergepanzer 3 Büffel. Rheinmetall has apparently developed its own version of the Leopard 2 hull, free of KNDS intellectual property, for the Bergepanzer 3A2 Büffel variant. By using this new hull for the Bergepanzer 3A2, it would be tested and qualified by the German Bundeswehr.

=== Optics and electronics ===
During the development of the KF51 Panther, a main goal of Rheinmetall's engineers was to minimize the sensor-to-shooter time gap; hence the Panther employs an AI-powered pixel change algorithm to automatically detect targets when static and on the move. The Panther demonstrator turret is fitted with the SEOSS 300 commander's sight and a variant of the EMES 15 gunner's sight also found on the Leopard 2 tank. The EMES sight has a new, fixed digital binocular sight, while work on integrating a dual thermal channel operating in both the long-wavelength and mid-wavelength infrared spectrums was being carried out in 2023.

Six SCM60 day and night digital see-through-armour system modules are mounted around the turret, providing a 360° situational awareness for the crew members. The system is already fielded on the Boxer CRV, Lynx and Puma IFV. For further situational awareness, an acoustic shooter locating system and laser warning receivers are installed on the KF51 Panther as well. All information is fused in a central computer system and provided to the crew. To detect drones, flat AESA radar panels could be installed on the turret.

The KF51 Panther is equipped with a battlefield management system and digital radios for controlling UAVs and UGVs. It is designed with an open digital architecture implementing the NGVA standard Each customer of the Panther has great influence on the selection of sub-components such as BMS, radio, RCWS and others. In these aspects, the Panther was designed to be modular to be adaptable to customer requirements.

For additional short range reconnaissance purposes, the KF51 Panther demonstrator turret includes launching bays for two small Stinger quadcopter, i.e. short-range UAVs, developed in cooperation with BärDrones. They have a 20–30 minute flight time and could be fitted with a small 200 grams (7.1 oz) warhead for combat purposes.

=== Armament ===
==== Primary armament ====
The primary armament of the KF51 is a stabilised Rheinmetall Rh-130 L/52 130 mm smoothbore gun that can be elevated from −9˚ to +20˚. Rheinmetall claims that this is capable of delivering between 18 and 20 megajoules (13,000,000 and 15,000,000 foot-pounds force) of energy onto a target and has a 50% longer effective range than Rheinmetall's 120 mm tank guns. The Rh-130 can fire armour-piercing fin-stabilized discarding sabot (APFSDS) ammunition, programmable air burst high-explosive (HE) rounds and practice projectiles.

The main gun is fed by an autoloader that consists of two conveyor-based magazines with a capacity of ten rounds each. Up to 10 further rounds can be carried on the tank. During a test firing in April 2022, the Rh-130 mounted on a test rig was able to fire three rounds in 16 seconds, though this included the time to perform safety checks. Two hatches are located in the turret sides to allow the autoloader's magazines to be replenished within five minutes. An option is available to carry an additional 10 rounds on the back of the vehicle outside of the hull and turret.

The autoloader was designed by the Swiss subsidiary of Rheinmetall, Rheinmetall Air Defence in Oerlikon, Zurich. The turret drive stabilisation system and the hand controllers will be supplied by the Swiss subsidiary of Curtiss-Wright, the system was selected by Rheinmetall in August 2025.

==== Secondary armament ====
The secondary armament consists of a coaxially mounted 12.7 mm machine gun. Rheinmetall's 'Natter' remote controlled weapon station (RCWS) with a 7.62 mm machine gun (can be elevated from −15˚ to +85˚ and can carry 2,500 rounds of ammunition) can be mounted on the rear of the turret roof to provide close-in defence and a counter-unmanned aircraft system (C-UAS) capability. The combination of commander's sight and RWS enables so-called hunter-killer and killer-killer operations.

The Panther's Advanced Mission Pod concept allows replacing either one or both magazines of the autoloader with specialized mission pods. These pods have the same size as the RAMP anti-tank missile launcher used on the Lance 2.0 turret used on the Lynx KF41 and Boxer CRV. At Eurosatory 2022, Rheinmetall showcased two options for mission pods: a quadruple launcher for the HERO 120 loitering munition from UVision and a mission pod carrying 13 UAVs.

The UAV pod mission pod was developed in cooperation with BärDrones. It carries a larger reconnaissance quadcopter that has a flight time of 50 minutes and automatically connects its battery for recharging after landing on the Panther. The bottom of the pod contains hydropneumatic launch tubes for twelve smaller Stinger drones. Those are micro-UAVs and have 20–30 minute flight time, 90 kilometres per hour (56 mph) top speed and the capacity to carry a 200 grams (7.1 oz) warhead.

=== Protection systems ===
In order to stay at a low mass, the KF51 Panther utilizes a hybrid protection concept, combining passive, reactive and active protection systems. The innermost layer consists of the all-welded steel structure covered by passive composite armour modules. The second layer comprises sensor-fused reactive armour, while the final layer consists of active protection system.

As hard-kill active protection system, Rheinmetall uses its StrikeShield system, which is capable of defeating anti-tank guided missiles, rocket-propelled grenades and kinetic energy penetrators, using an "energy blade". The KE penetrators are usually broken into 2 to 4 pieces when hit by the StrikeShield APS, dispersing the kinetic energy over a larger impact area and thus significantly reducing their penetration capacity.

As shaped charge threats can be defeated more easily by active protection systems, while KE penetrators retain a larger amount of residual penetration, the Panther's passive armour is optimized for defeating KE rounds. In 2023, Rheinmetall considered the integration of a second, launcher-based APS to given the high potential of such a system to defeat top-attack threats. The company stated that in a future iteration, the Panther could receive such a system. On the KF51-U demonstrator, the Iron Fist hard-kill system and the MUSS 2.0 soft-kill system are fitted to the turret, while StrikeShield modules are installed on the hull.

As soft-kill measures, the Panther is fitted with eight Rheinmetall Rapid Obscuring System (ROSY) smoke grenade launchers mounted in staggered rows of two behind the central camera housing on each side of the turret. The Panther's sensors can detect the launch signature of ATGMs and anti-tank missiles and cue the crew towards the threat.

To defeat drones and other source of top-attack threats, the Panther features the Top Attack Protection Systems (TAPS). TAPS uses different soft-kill and hard-kill effectors and sensors. As of 2023, the core of the TAPS was developed, but the exact choice of effectors was still open.

== Variants ==
=== Main battle tanks variants ===
==== KF51-U ====
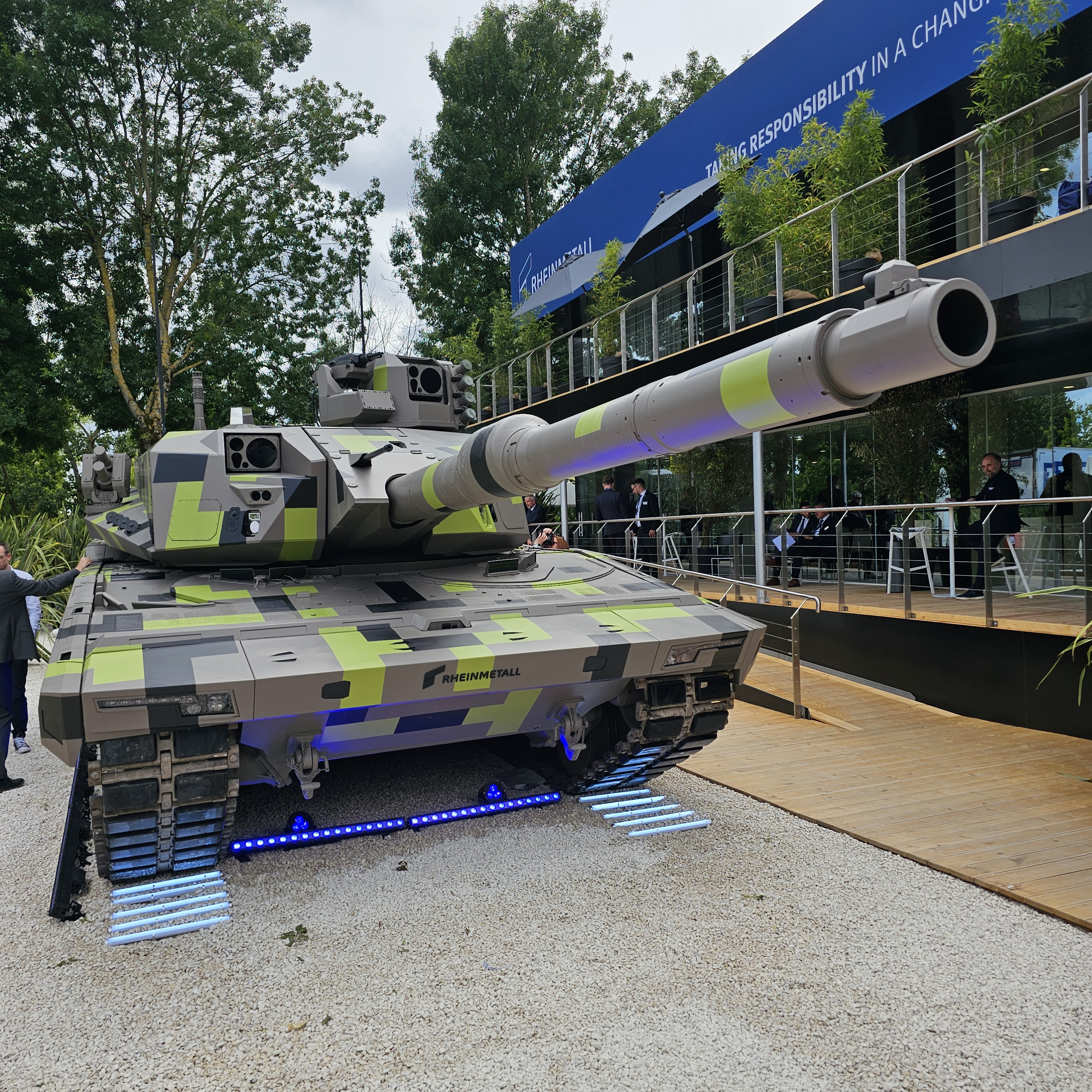
The Panther KF51-U has an unmanned turret

In June 2024, Rheinmetall presented the KF51-U at the Eurosatory defence fair. It uses a modified version of the original Panther demonstrator hull fitted with the Concept Unmanned Turret (CUT). Its three-men crew sits in the hull just in front of the turret. The KF51-U retains the 130 mm smoothbore gun and 20 round autoloader from two magazines, but can carry a further 5 spare rounds in the turret. As secondary armament, the KF51-U has a coaxial 12.7 mm heavy machine gun and a 7.62 mm RMG as Main Sensor Slaved Armament (MSSA). The main gun has a maximum depression of −9° and a maximum elevation of +20°.

Unlike other unmanned turrets, the KF51-U's CUT is understood to feature 'good' protection while being 10 to 20% lighter than the manned Panther turret, which accounts for more than 1,000 kilograms (2,200 lb) lower weight. The combat weight of the tank is somewhere between 50 and 60 tonnes. In addition to the StrikeShield system mounted on the hull, the KF51-U is also fitted with the Iron Fist and MUSS 2.0 active protection systems. Additionally, the ROSY_VL system is installed on top of the turret for protection against top-attack missiles and drones.

Both the gunner and commander are provided with newer SEOSS 400 sights, which offer improved performance and greater detection ranges than the previous SEOSS 300 and EMES 15 sights used in the Panther demonstrator turret. The SEOSS 400 sight was presented in detail at the DSEI 2025 exhibition. It features larger, 5 megapixel CCD and MWIR sensors, increasing identification range of tank-sized targets to above 6 kilometres (3.7 mi). The commander's SEOSS 400 sight acts as optic for the MSSA system, which also includes a counter-UAS radar to detect and track drones.

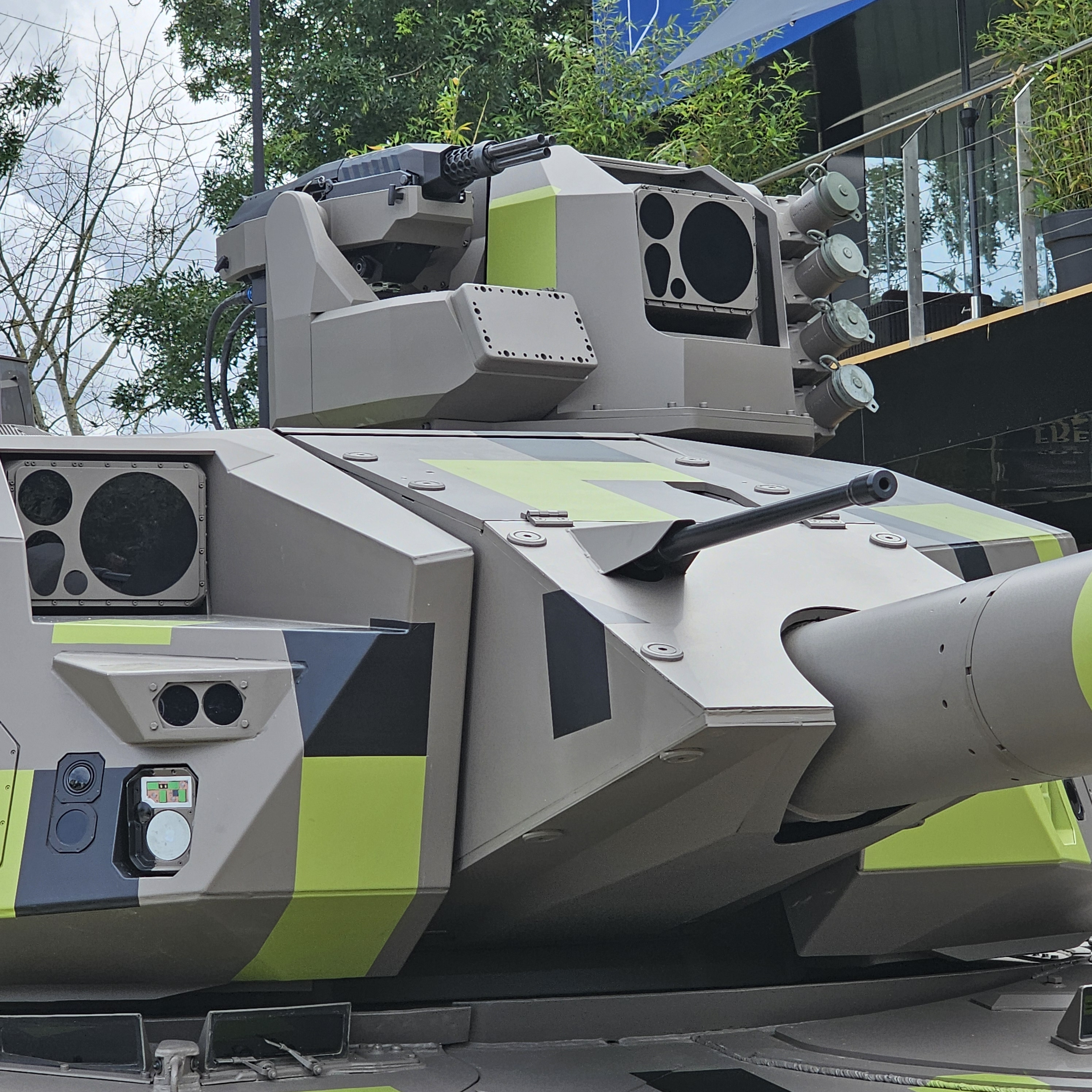
View of the 12.7 mm coaxial machine gun, gunner's sight and commander's sight

Close-up view of the commander's sight with MSSA system, RMG 7.62 machine gun and C-UAS radar

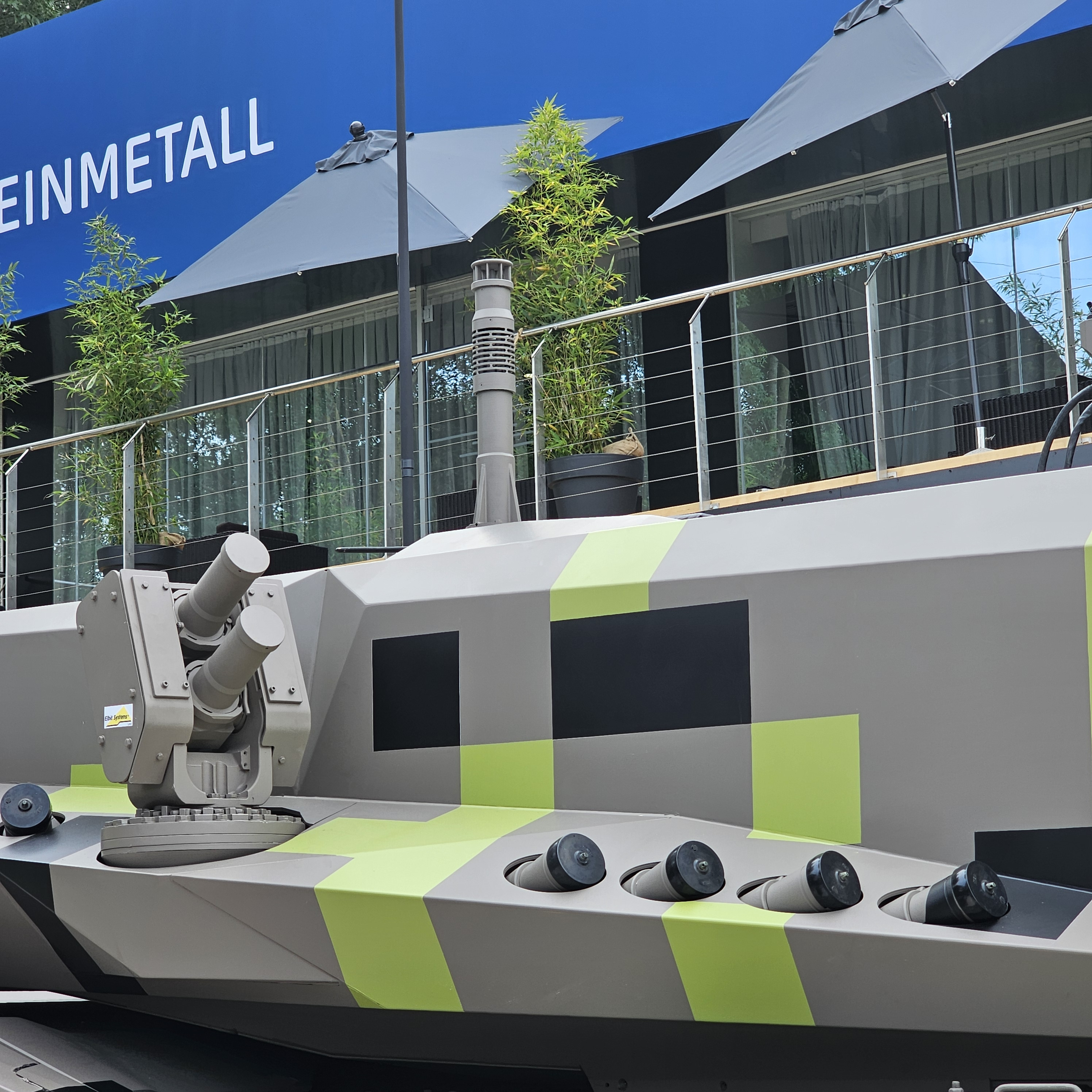
KF51-U turret side with Iron Fist launcher

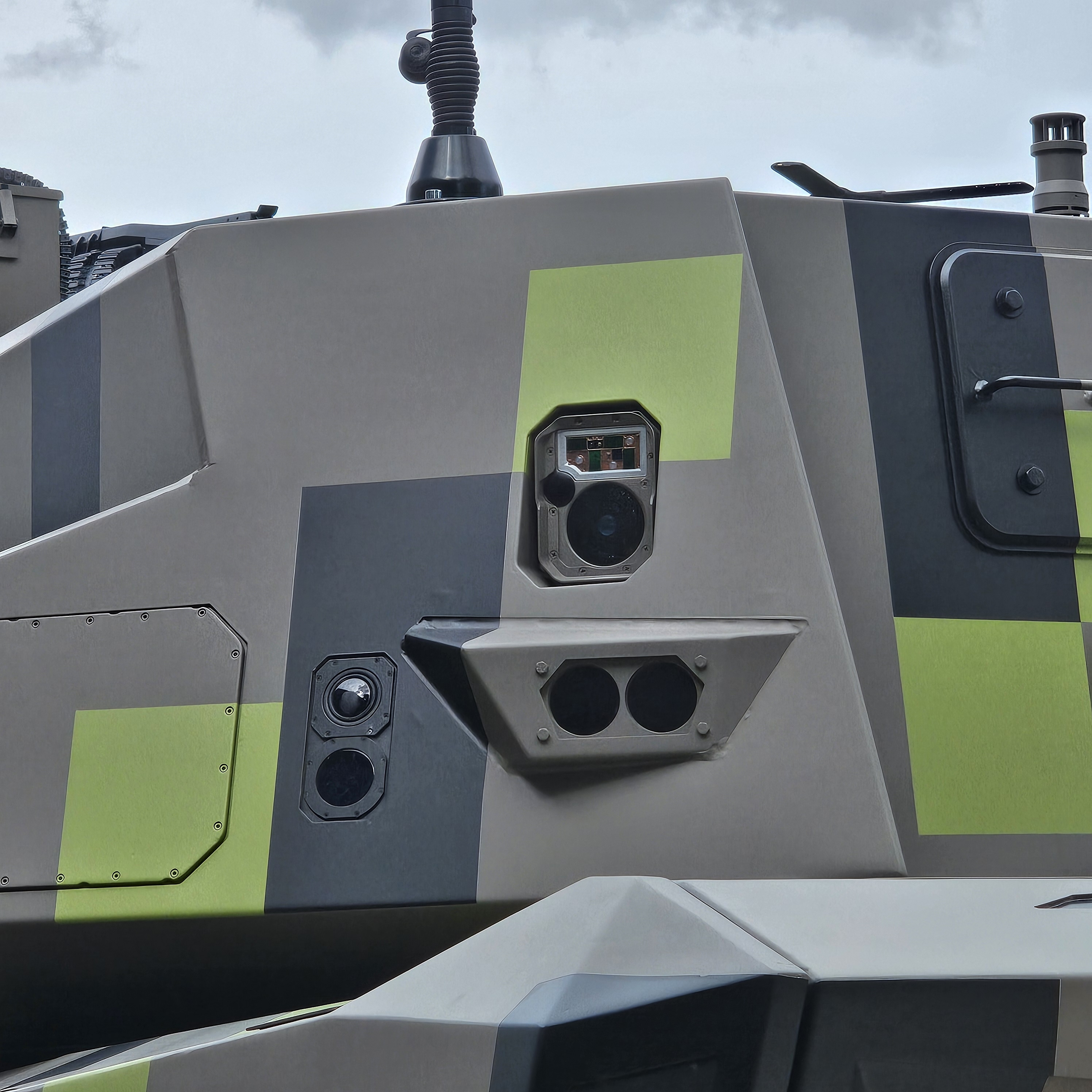
View of the sensors on the KF51-U turret

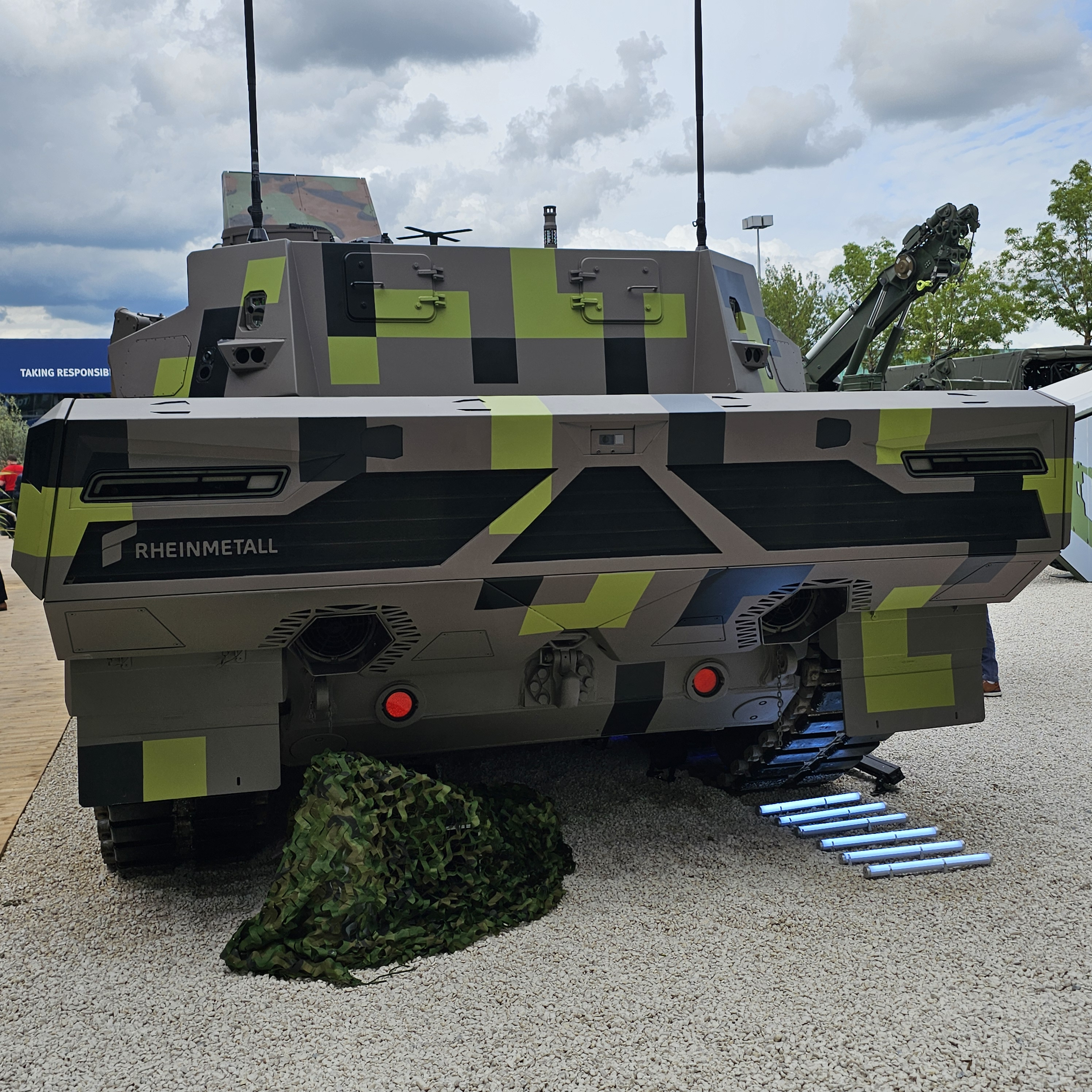
Panther KF51-U rear view

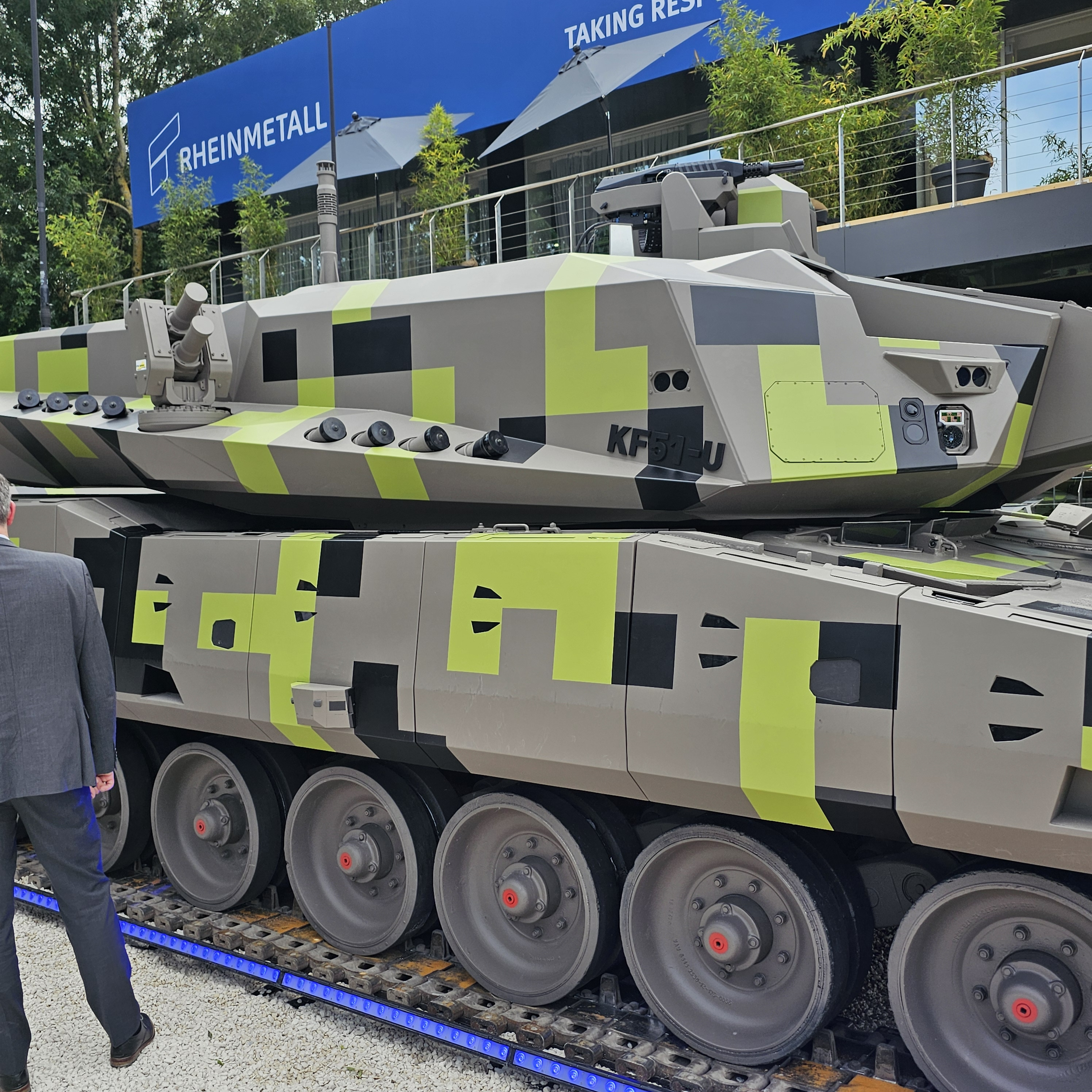
Side view of the KF51-U

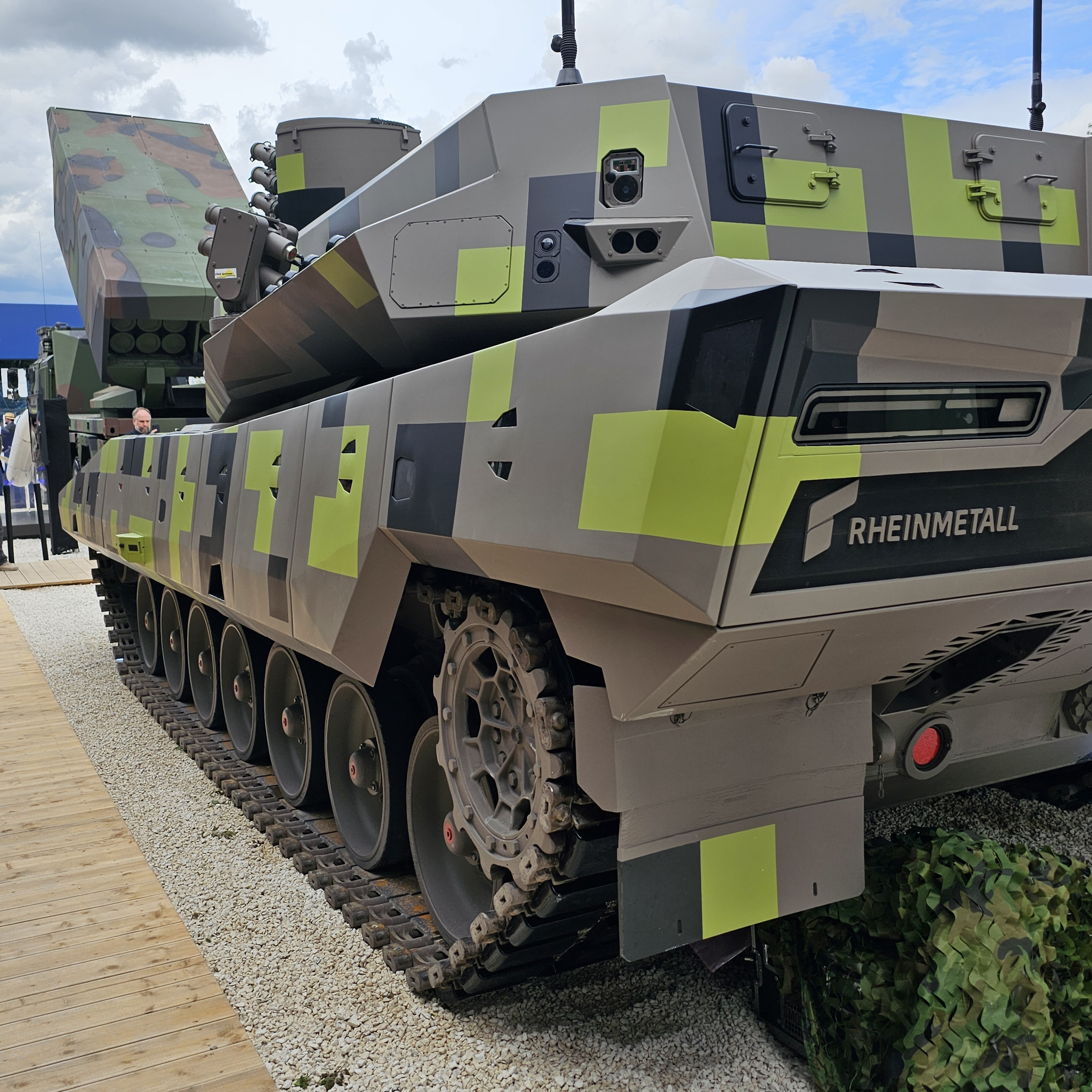
KF51-U side skirts with StrikeShield APS

==== New Main Battle Tank ====
The New Main Battle Tank (NMBT), formerly known as Italian Main Battle Tank (IMBT), is a variant of the KF51 Panther developed by Leonardo Rheinmetall Military Vehicles (LRMV) for the Italian Army. A NMBT demonstrator based on a Leopard 2A4 hull was presented at Eurosatory 2026. The production version of the NMBT will utilise a new hull, which is currently under development by Rheinmetall.

The NMBT has a four-person crew, consisting of a commander, a driver, a gunner and a specialist unmanned systems operator. Its primary armament consists of a 120 mm L/55A1 smoothbore gun, but the turret is designed in such a way that it can be upgraded with Rheinmetall's 130 mm FGS in under twelve hours. A twenty-round autoloader located in the turret bustle reloads the main gun.The secondary armament consists of a 12.7 mm coaxial machine gun mounted on the gun mantlet and a Leonardo Hitrole C-UAS remotely controlled weapon station armed with a 30 x 103 mm Blaze 30 autocannon with 150 rounds. The NMBT will be able to fire Leonardo's new Vulcano 120 beyond line-of-sight round with a range of up to 30 kilometres (19 mi).

Depending on the configuration, the NMBT weighs between 61 and 67 tonnes with a maximum gross vehicle weight of 69.5 tonnes (68.4 long tons; 76.6 short tons). It utilises a combination of active, hybrid and passive protection systems. In particular the prominent front of the turret is fitted with a hybrid protection system that can defeat kinetic energy projectiles. Unlike the previous KF51 and KF51-U Panther demonstrators that were showcased at earlier Eurosatory expositions, the Strike Shield APS is mounted on the turret rather than the hull. ROSY smoke grenade dischargers, including the ROSY_VL system, are mounted on the turret roof.

The NMBT implements the NATO Generic Vehicle Architecture standards and is outfitted with wide range of sensors, including laser warning receivers (the MSH from the MUSS 2.0 system), acoustic sensors and a 360° electro-optical day-and-night situational awareness system. The main sights for commander and gunner are upgraded versions of Leonardo's ATTILA sight.

As of Eurosatory 2026, the power pack for the NMBT has yet to be decided; engine options from both MTU and Iveco Defence Vehicles being under consideration. LRMV expects the series production variant to reach a top speed of 70 kilometres per hour (43 mph) and accelerate from 0 to 40 kilometres per hour (25 mph) within eight seconds. The road range is expected to be 450 kilometres (280 mi). Unlike the earlier KF51 Panther concepts, the NMBT will not feature an APU. Instead it will utilise a lithium-ion battery power pack that will enable it to drive up to eight hours without using its combustion engines.

==== Panther EVO Upgrade and Leopard 2A4 Panther Upgrade ====
The Panther EVO Upgrade consists of the KF51 turret mounted on a Leopard 2A4 hull

The Panther EVO Upgrade was first presented to the public at the Eurosatory in June 2024. While the hull of the Panther demonstrator was re-used for the KF51-U variant, the Panther KF51 turret was fitted to a Leopard 2A4 chassis. This showcases the potential to upgrade existing Leopard 2 tanks with the Panther turret. It is armed with Rheinmetall's 120 mm L55A1 smoothbore gun but can be up-gunned with the 130 mm Future Gun System (FGS) instead. Coaxial armament consits of a 12.7 mm heavy machine gun. The 'Natter' RCWS was removed from the turret.

At the MSPO 2024 international defence exhibition in Kielce, Poland, the same tank was showcased under the name Leopard 2A4 Panther Upgrade, again armed with a 120 mm L/55A1 gun.

==== Panther KF51 EVO ====
The variant to be built in Hungary, with the 120 mm L/55A1 cannon (found also on the Leopard 2A7HU tank) and a hull derived from the Bergepanzer 3 'Büffel' chassis.

At Eurosatory 2026, Rheinmetall presented a scale model of the Panther EVO. While it its design is largely identical with the NMBT, it differs in a number of key details. Notably, components such as the communication systems, fire control system, including the main optics, and the remotely controlled weapon station, which will be supplied by Italian companies for the NMBT, will be replaced with components manufactured by German companies.. For example, instead of an improved version of Leonardo's ATILLA sights, the Panther EVO will utilise sights from Rheinmetall's own SEOSS product line.

=== Engineering and support variants ===
==== Panther KF51 ARV ====
Among the requirements of the Italian Army are 140 support tanks, of which some will be armoured recovery vehicles that will replace the Bergepanzer 2 based on the Leopard 1.

==== Panther KF51 AEV ====
Among the requirements of the Italian Army are 140 support tanks, of which some will be armoured recovery vehicles that will replace the Pionierpanzer 1 based on the Leopard 1.

==== Panther KF51 AVLB ====
Among the requirements of the Italian Army are 140 support tanks, of which some will be armoured recovery vehicles that will replace the Biber based on the Leopard 1.

== Collaborations ==
=== Hungary ===
On 15 December 2023, Rheinmetall announced that the company had signed a contract worth €288 million with the Hungarian government to develop the Panther KF51 EVO variant with the 120 mm L/55A1 cannon and a hull based on the Bergepanzer 3 chassis.

=== Italy ===
After failing to reach an agreement with KNDS over the procurement and domestic production of new Leopard 2A8 tanks and support vehicles, on 3 July 2024, Rheinmetall and Leonardo announced they would establish a 50:50 joint venture to produce KF51 tanks and infantry fighting vehicles as part of the Italian Army Main Battle Tank (MBT) and Armoured Infantry Combat System (AICS) programs. The joint venture would also assist in defining a roadmap for future involvement of both companies in the Main Ground Combat System project.

On 16 January 2025, the Italian Ministry of Defence announced at the IAV 2025 conference plans to procure up to 380 new vehicles based on the KF51 Panther platform, including recovery, rescue, and engineering variants, to improve the lethality, mobility, and survivability of its mechanized forces. To replace the aging C1 and C2 Ariete tanks, the KF51 will be adapted to meet the specific operational requirements of the Italian Army. Additionally, over 1,000 infantry fighting vehicles (IFVs) based on Rheinmetall's KF41 Lynx platform will be acquired as part of an extensive modernization program and partnership with Rheinmetall. The overall budget for this initiative is expected to exceed €10 billion.

At Eurosatory 2026, a demonstrator of the Italian KF51 Panther version known as the New Main Battle Tank was presented by LRMV.

=== Ukraine ===
In February 2023, Rheinmetall revealed they were in talks with Ukraine to supply KF51s Panthers (and KF41 Lynx IFVs) to the Ukrainian military. Rheinmetall's CEO Armin Papperger said that a new factory could be built in the country (with Rheinmetall estimating the cost of constructing a Ukrainian plant to be around €200 million) and the first delivery could be in 15 to 18 months, producing annually up to 400 Panther tanks.

In October 2023, a joint venture was formally signed between Rheinmetall and Ukroboronprom to establish an armoured vehicle repair and construction facility first to produce Fuchs vehicles within 6–7 months and Lynx IFVs within 12–13 months, with production of Panther KF51 to begin afterwards. The facility began production of the first KF41 Lynx vehicles in October 2024, consistent with initial timeline estimates. It is unclear whether Ukraine will produce the same KF51 EVO version being developed in Hungary, or a new domestic variant.

By November 2025, supply of KF51 to Ukraine had fallen through.

== Operators ==
Operators Future Potential

=== Future ===
Italy
Orders:
- October 2026: 30 Panther KF51.

=== Potential ===
Hungary
Following the development order, Hungary is likely to purchase a certain number of Panther KF51 EVO.

=== Failed bids ===
Romania
Rheinmetall proposed the KF51 for the second phase of Romania's tank program valued at €6.5 billion, which included the acquisition of 216 tanks. The other participants in the program are the K2 Black Panther offered by Hyundai Rotem and the Leopard 2A8 offered by KNDS Deutschland. Later Romania's Ministry of Defense announced they had opted to purchase M1 Abrams tanks from the United States instead.
Ukraine
In 2023, Ukraine considered purchase and even manufacture of some variants of the Panther KF51, but the deal fell through in 2025.

== See also ==
- EMBT ADT140, Franco-German main battle tank demonstrator
- Main Ground Combat System, Franco-German project for a new generation main battle tank and other tactical military vehicles
