= European multilateral defence procurement =

How the continent collectively obtains its weapons

The Eurofighter was developed, produced and procured by several European nations

European multilateral defence procurement refers to the collective armaments purchasing policies of European nations.

European countries hope to establish a profitable export competing the American one.

== Industry ==
In 2015, the German Krauss-Maffei Wegmann (KMW) and French Nexter merged under a joint holding company KMW+Nexter Defense Systems. Both companies are major producers of military land systems.

Other major European defence contractors include:

- Airbus Defence and Space — (Europe)
- Airbus Helicopters — (Europe)
- BAE Systems — (UK)
- Dassault Aviation — (France)
- Damen Group — (Netherlands)
- Diehl Defence — (Germany)
- Kongsberg Defence & Aerospace — (Norway)
- Leonardo S.p.A., including the former AgustaWestland — (Italy)
- Naval Group — (France)
- Navantia — (Spain)
- Rheinmetall — (Germany)
- Rolls-Royce — (UK)
- Saab Group — (Sweden)
- Safran — (France)
- Thales Group — (France)
- ThyssenKrupp Marine Systems — (Germany)

== Products ==
Then British Prime Minister Tony Blair came under pressure from President Bill Clinton to select Raytheon's future missile to arm the Eurofighter, however the UK government selected the European Meteor air-to-air missile.

Former Airbus Group CEO Tom Enders had called the difficulties in coordinating European investment in the A400M program a "horror", and said "I am determined, at least for my company, not to ever again walk into such a program".

French President Emmanuel Macron and former German Chancellor Angela Merkel signaled their countries intention to co-operate on the development of a future combat aircraft to be produced as a replacement for Dassault Rafale and Eurofighter Typhoon.

== Code of Conduct on Defence Procurement ==
The European Union has adopted a code of conduct with the objective to inject transparency and competition into the military procurement. It is administered by the EDA and under its scope are contracts under Article 346 of TFEU, of at least €1 million and with the exclusions of weapons of mass destruction, cryptographic equipment and other procurements.

As of 2009 the code is adopted by Norway and all EDA members except Romania, who may join later.

== See also ==
- OCCAR
- European Border and Coast Guard Agency
- Common Security and Defence Policy
  - European Defence Fund
  - Permanent Structured Cooperation
  - European Defence Agency
