= Leclerc XLR =

Fourth-generation main battle tank

- Type: Main battle tank
- Place of origin: France

Production history
- Manufacturer: KNDS France
- Produced: 2021–present
- No. built: 15 (200 ordered total)

Specifications
- Main armament: 120 mm tank gun
- Secondary armament: 12.7 mm machine gun; 7.62 mm machine gun

The Leclerc XLR is a French fourth-generation main battle tank (MBT) developed and manufactured by the KNDS France. It is a modernization of the third-generation Leclerc tank with the addition of a turret-mounted remotely-operated 7.62mm caliber machine gun manufactured by Belgian company FN Herstal, additional modular armour on the turret and hull, and rear wire cage armour to protect the engine compartment against rocket propelled grenades.

The components that mark this tank as fourth-generation are mostly electronic: networked architecture allowing an interface between the Thales tactical radio system, the NBC protection system, night vision equipment and the Atos-brand SCORPION Information and Command System (SICS) and associated display screens. The upgraded Leclerc comes with a counter-IED jammer, new man-machine interfaces for commander and gunner, redesigned main system computers, and a battle health monitoring system. The inertial navigation system and GPS navigation system are fused.

== History ==
The fourth-generation upgrade of 200 Leclercs was announced in March 2015, with the first two XLR prototypes planned for 2018 and the remaining 198 slated for completion over eight years, starting in 2020. The contract was valued at approximately €330 million. By 2025, 122 tanks are planned to be upgraded to the XLR version.

== Operators ==
=== Current operators ===
- France: 15 (200 ordered total)

=== Potential operators ===
- India: In January 2022 Nexter officials were contacted by India on participating in the Future Ready Combat Vehicle program with the proposal of the Leclerc XLR MBT. On 1 January 2022, the Indian Army was rumored to have invited the French to bid for a contract to supply 1,000 units of the Leclerc XLR to replace the aging Indian T-72 fleet.
- Croatia: In April 2022 talks were held between Nexter representatives and Croatian delegation about possible acquisition of Leclerc XLR tanks for Croatian Army.

== See also ==
- Leclerc Evolution, French project of fourth generation main battle tank
- EMBT ADT140, French-German project of fourth generation main battle tank
- Main Ground Combat System, French-German project of new generation main battle tank and other tactical military vehicles
