= Leopard 3 =

- Type: Main battle tank
- Place of origin: Germany

Production history
- Designer: KNDS Deutschland, Rheinmetall and Hensoldt
- Designed: Since 2025
- Developed from: Leopard 2A8
- Produced: Expected in the 2030s

Specifications
- Crew: 3 (driver, gunner, commander)
- Shell: DM11, DM13, DM23
- Shell weight: 30 kg (66 lb)
- Caliber: 130mm
- Effective firing range: 10 km (6.2 mi)
- Main armament: 130mm Rheinmetall L/51 smoothbore gun

The Leopard 3, also known as the Leopard 2AX, is a fourth-generation German main battle tank (MBT).

Germany plans to purchase the Main Ground Combat System (MGCS) as a successor to the Leopard 2 (current variants 2A5, 2A6 and 2A7 and upcoming variant 2A8). This tank will not be ready before the 2040s. The German Army expressed new needs for an interim solution. Early 2025, the development of this Leopard 3 was kicked off, and it is expected to enter production in the early 2030s.

It is designed with a service life of 25 years.

As of July 2025, the German Army expressed a need for 1,000 additional tanks that would be made up of Leopard 2A8, Leopard 3 and MGCS.

== Design ==
=== Early design information ===
The changes that were mentioned from the Leopard 2A8 include:

- A new tank gun: Rheinmetall Rh-130 L/51 with a 50% increased kinetic energy compared to the Rh-120.
- Munitions:
  - DM11 (130 mm variant), a multifunctional combat ammunition (HE) for fire support
  - DM13, standard APFSDS (Armour-piercing fin-stabilized discarding sabot)
  - DM23, higher energy APFSDS
- A new engine from Liebherr. KNDS Deutschland received a contract to offer an alternative engine with the project OLYMP, with the aim to improve the mobility. The project OLYMP also includes a transmission, steering, and cooling systems.
- Hensoldt would supply the MUSS 2.0 countermeasure system against modern ATGM.
- Remote turret with an automatic loader and a crew of three people.

== Operators ==
=== Potential operators ===
Germany
The German Army operates 312 tanks as of 2026:
- 19 Leopard 2A5 KWS II
- 68 Leopard 2A6
- 34 Leopard 2A6A3
- 20 Leopard 2A6M
- 50 Leopard 2A6MA3
- 104 Leopard 2A7V
- 17 Leopard 2A7A1
The German Army ordered:
- 123 Leopard 2A8, with an additional 75 planned to be ordered in 2026
Future plans:
- As of July 2025, the German Army plans to order up to 1,000 additional MBTs. This would likely include a mix of Leopard 2A8 (of which production has started), the intermediate solution of the Leopard 2AX / Leopard 3 and the MGCS.

== See also ==
- Leopard 1
- Leopard 2
- Panther KF51
- Tanks in the German Army
- List of main battle tanks by generation
