= EMBT =

French-German tank

Enhanced Main Battle Tank (EMBT)
- Type: Main battle tank
- Place of origin: France; Germany

Production history
- Manufacturer: KNDS
- No. built: 2 (technology demonstrators)

Specifications
- Mass: 61.5 tonnes (60.5 long tons; 67.8 short tons)
- Length: 10.45 metres (34.3 ft)
- Width: 3.85 metres (12.6 ft)
- Height: 3.24 metres (10.6 ft)
- Main armament: EMBT: 120 mm CN120-26 (EMBT) or Ascalon 120 mm tank gun (alternatively) EMBT ADT140: Ascalon 140 mm tank gun
- Secondary armament: ARX30 30 mm RCWS EMBT: coaxial 12.7 mm machine gun EMBT ADT140; 20 mm × 102 autocannon
- Engine: MTU MT883; 1500 hp
- Transmission: Renk HSWL 295
- Suspension: torsion-bars
- Ground clearance: 470 millimetres (19 in)
- Operational range: 460 kilometres (290 mi) (road)
- Maximum speed: 65 kilometres per hour (40 mph)

The Enhanced Main Battle Tank (EMBT, also E-MBT) is a French-German technology demonstrator for an enhanced main battle tank (MBT) developed and manufactured by KNDS. It combines features of the Leclerc and the Leopard 2, the two MBTs made by the French and German parts of KNDS respectively.

The Enhanced Main Battle Tank was first showcased in 2022. It was preceded by the European Main Battle Tank, a prototype which was presented during the Eurosatory 2018. A new version of the EMBT was presented during the Eurosatory 2024.

== Design and development ==
=== European Main Battle Tank ===
A first technology demonstrator known as EMBT or European Main Battle Tank was presented in 2018, combining a Leopard 2A7 hull with a Leclerc turret using a special turret ring adapter. It was sometimes nicknamed Leo-Clerc and was designed to symbolize the cooperation of Nexter (the later KNDS France) and Krauss-Maffei Wegmann (the later KNDS Deutschland), i.e. the two companies forming KNDS. Compared to the Leopard 2 turret, the Leclerc turret is operated by only 2 crew members instead of 3 thanks to the autoloader. Since the Leclerc's turret is therefore lighter compared to that of the manually loaded Leopard 2A7, the EMBT is lighter and has a greater growth potential of around 6 tonnes (5.9 long tons; 6.6 short tons).

As per KMW, full contract with a potential buyer was required to turn the European Main Battle Tank into a real product.

=== Enhanced Main Battle Tank ===
At Eurosatory 2022, a second technology demonstrator was presented as Enhanced Main Battle Tank, featuring a modified hull and a new turret fitted with the 120-millimeter CN120-26 main gun. As per KNDS, the goal of the Enhanced Main Battle Tank development was to "show to the market what a modern MBT produced with available technologies might look like" The hull of the EMBT is based on the Leopard 2A7's, but modified in a few key areas: the power pack is replaced with the EuroPowerPack, consisting of the MTU MT883 engine and Renk HSWL 295TM transmission. As the EuroPowerPack is smaller in size, this allows moving back the turret ring by about 0.2 metres. This enabled KNDS' engineers to lengthen the glacis plate, making enough space for a fourth crew member (sitting in the same location where the hull ammo rack is in the Leopard 2). The fourth crew member can operate the remote weapon station or drones. Drive-by wire technology has been implemented in the hull; an additional 23 cameras provide improved situational awareness at day and night.

The turret of the EMBT is completely new and has a reduced profile with an 80 millimetres (3.1 in) lower roof height than the Leclerc. It is not fitted with actual armour as this would only be developed upon contract, but enough weight and space were reserved to install an armour package. The EMBT's main armament is the 120 mm CN120-26 L/52 gun from the Leclerc, but its architecture is designed to be compatible with the ASCALON gun system under development by KNDS France. It is loaded by a 22-round conveyor-belt type autoloader located in the turret bustle. Secondary armament consists of a co-axial 12.7 mm machine gun with 680 rounds, a 30 mm x 113 mm ARX30 remote controlled weapon station with 150 rounds and a 7.62 mm machine gun with 800 rounds, which is attached to the commander's sight.

The EMBT uses vetronics derived from the EBRC Jaguar and is fitted with the Trophy-MV hardkill active protection system for protection against ATGMs and rocket-propelled grenades. Unlike on older tanks retrofitted with Trophy, the EMBT's turret was designed with the system in mind from the onset, hence the sensors are directly embedded into the turret structure. Additionally, the EMBT is fitted with the ELAWS laser warning system from Elbit Systems.

==== EMBT ADT140 ====
At Eurosatory 2024, a new configuration of the Enhanced Main Battle Tank was presented as EMBT ADT140, featuring a mock-up Ascalon Demonstrator Turret (ADT140) with autoloaded 140-millimeter Ascalon main gun, a coaxial 20 × 102 mm autocannon and the ARX30 remote controlled weapon station. The hull of the earlier EMBT demonstrator was reused, while its turret was mounted on a modified Leclerc hull, creating the Leclerc Evolution. The EMBT ADT140 features six anti-drone radars, four laser and missile warning sensors, an acoustic gunshot detection system and provides 360-degree coverage of the surroundings for enhanced situational awareness. It was also fitted with a mock-up of the Prometheus active protection system and features a AI-enabled “SAFE” fire control system, an internally developed solution designed to assist the autonomous selection and queuing of weapon systems on board the platform to successfully prosecute targets in order of priority.

The 2024 version will be further developed; it might be used to demonstrate technologies for the Main Ground Combat System. Expected to enter service in 2035, the MGCS will replace the European Leopard 2 and Leclerc XLR tanks.

== See also ==
- Leclerc XLR, French upgraded main battle tank (in production)
- Leclerc Evolution, French upgraded main battle tank (prototype)
- Panther KF51, German main battle tank (preparation for series production)
- Main Ground Combat System, French-German project of new generation main battle tank and other tactical military vehicles
