= Bourget =

Bourget may refer to:

== People ==
- Barbara Bourget (born 1950) Canadian artistic director
- Claude Marc Bourget (born 1956) Canadian musician, writer and journalist
- Ignace Bourget (1799–1885), French-Canadian Roman Catholic priest and bishop of the Diocese of Montreal.
- Maurice Bourget (1907–1979) Canadian politician
- Paul Bourget (1852–1935), French novelist and critic
- Robert Bourget-Pailleron (1897–1970), French novelist

== French communes ==
- Le Bourget, Seine-Saint-Denis département
- Le Bourget-du-Lac, Savoie département
- Bourget-en-Huile, Savoie département
- Villarodin-Bourget, Savoie département

== Other ==
- Le Bourget Airport, an airport near Paris
- Lac du Bourget, the largest lake in the French Alps
- Bourget, Ontario
- Bourget (electoral district), a provincial electoral district in Quebec
