= Leclerc Evolution =

French tank

- Type: Main battle tank
- Place of origin: France

Production history
- Manufacturer: Nexter Systems
- Produced: 2024–
- No. built: 1 (prototype)

Specifications
- Crew: 4
- Main armament: Ascalon 120 mm or 140 mm tank gun; ARX30 30 mm RCWS
- Secondary armament: 12.7 mm machine gun; 7.62 mm machine gun

Leclerc Evolution is a French prototype of the enhanced fourth-generation main battle tank (MBT) developed and manufactured by the KNDS France.

The project was presented during the Eurosatory 2024. The tank is equipped with a turret armed with the ASCALON (Autoloaded and SCALable Outperforming guN) gun, capable of firing 120 or 140 mm shells, an ARX30 turret, a PASEO sight coupled with a 7.62 mm machine gun, a "Trophy" active protection system and the ability to use remotely operated ammunition. According to BFM TV, Leclerc Evolution will be operational in 2030 and KNDS France is said to be in discussions with several countries. KNDS France explained that the Leclerc Evolution is not intended to compete with the latest versions of Leopard 2 or future joint offerings (EMBT ADT140). The idea is to offer it in markets where the Leopard is not considered the appropriate solution.

== See also ==
- Leclerc XLR, French fourth-generation main battle tank (in production)
- EMBT ADT140, French-German enhanced fourth-generation main battle tank
- Main Ground Combat System, French-German project of new generation main battle tank and other tactical military vehicles
