= Future Ready Combat Vehicle =

Indian main battle tank programme

The Future Ready Combat Vehicle (FRCV), also designated as Project Ranjeet (lit. 'Victorious in Battle'), is a design and development programme to develop a next generation main battle tank to replace the T-72 fleet of the Indian Army. As of 2024, T-72 is the mainstay of the Indian Army Armoured Corps. Around 1,770 units shall be inducted in three phases (approx. 590 each).

== History ==
On 22 June 2015, it was reported that the Indian Army has released a Request for Information (RFI) to global tank manufacturers to submit proposals to design a "new generation, state-of-the-art combat vehicle platform". The design would serve as the "base platform" for the development of 10 other variants including bridge laying and trawl tanks, self-propelled artillery and air defence gun, a combat engineering vehicle and tracked ambulance. The initiative, from the Directorate General of Mechanised Forces, was named Future Ready Combat Vehicle (FRCV). This was a parallel development with the Defence Research and Development Organisation (DRDO) Future Main Battle Tank (FMBT) which, as of 2010, was expected to be completed by 2020. The FMBT project was worth around ₹25,000 crore (equivalent to ₹560 billion or US$5.8 billion in 2023) for designing, development and testing followed by production at a rate of ₹50 crore (equivalent to ₹112 crore or US$12 million in 2023) per tank. The total project would be worth ₹1.5 lakh crore (equivalent to ₹3.4 trillion or US$35 billion in 2023).

FRCV would proceed in three stages - design stage, prototype development stage and production stage. The RFI is open to both domestic and international firms. The prototypes of the competing manufacturers would be tested and evaluated. The "best" prototype would be chosen and then produced by a "nominated developing agency". By July 2015, Tata Motors responded to the FRCV RFI that was released in June 2015.

As per the Ministry of Defence, the FMBT and the FRCV are two parallel projects and FRCV is meant for "futuristic requirements beyond 2027" and "not in conflict with the current MBT Arjun programme and its future orders". The Army had been against the further ordering of 118 units of Arjun MkII variant (now, Arjun Mk1A) as it has a weight of around 67 tonnes in spite of successfully demonstrating 53 of the 73 upgrades over Arjun Mk1. Army officers stated that, "Many bridges and culverts in Punjab will not be able to take its weight. Moreover, our rail tank transporters will find it tough to carry the Arjuns from one sector to another".

== Design ==
The tank will have a weight of less than 60 tonnes, carry 4 troops and will feature superior mobility, all terrain ability, multilayered protections, precision and lethal fires, and real-time situational awareness along with artificial intelligence, drone integration, active protection system, network centric operation capabilities. It should be transportable by existing infrastructure of rail, road and aircraft.

== Current status ==
The programme worth ₹57,000 crore (US$5.9 billion) was approved by Defence Acquisition Council (DAC) of the MoD on 3 September 2024. The project will follow Make I procedure of defence procurement, through which the government will fund 70% of the project and the industry partner(s) will fund the remainder. As the Acceptance of Necessity (AoN) has been granted by DAC, the Army will roll out an Expression of Interest (EoI) in which all the necessary parameters required by the Army will be published. When interested industry partner(s) respond to it, Request for Proposal (RFP) will be issued. Then, 2 developing agencies shall be shortlisted (most likely private sector companies) to whom project sanction order will be extended. This process is expected to take 6–8 months post-DAC approval. The developing agencies shall roll out their prototypes within 3–4 years followed by user trials and induction by 2030. The order will be split between the selected companies. The FRCV project is renamed as Project Ranjit as reported in November 2024.

As of August 2025, Russia has reportedly offered the technology transfer of the T-14 Armata tank to India to allow its local production under the latter's Make in India programme. Uralvagonzavod, the tank's designing agency, has also offered to modify as well as design and develop an Indian variant of the Armata, in collaboration with the Combat Vehicles Research and Development Establishment (CVRDE), in order to serve the unique requirements of the Indian Army. While, the per unit cost of the base variant of the tank is reported to be between ₹30 crore (US$3.1 million)–₹42 crore (US$4.4 million), the potential Indian-specific variant is expected to be at least ₹10 crore (US$1.0 million) lesser. If realised, the agreement will be on lines with India's local production of T-90 Bhishma.

In September 2025, the Technology Perspective and Capability Roadmap (TPCR) 2025 outlined the procurement of 1,700–1,800 tanks over a period of 10–15 years to replace the existing T-72 fleet of the Indian Army. The FRCV is expected to serve for 40 years and, hence, be integrated with a wide range of modern equipment to remain relevant on the battlefield. The FRCV should incorporate a fully digitised Human-Machine Teaming and Intelligence, Surveillance and Reconnaissance (ISR) capabilities with controls for onboard and offboard unmanned systems like Unmanned Ground Vehicles (UGVs), Unmanned Aerial Vehicles (UAVs) and Loitering Munitions (LMs). The vehicle is also expected to efficiently function in a network-centric warfare with Integrated Battlefield Management System (BMS) and Identification of Friend or Foe (IFF) Systems in order to operate against cyberattacks and electronic warfare environment. They should also be capable of striking beyond line of sight (BLOS) targets using loitering munitions and in-service surveillance drones which would be operating from the platform as a system. The tank would be equipped with day-night sensors throughout the hull and turret to provide the tank crew and C4I with a stitched, 360° mosaic, panoramic view. The platform must also incorporate a Defence Series Maps (DSM)-compatible Hybrid Navigation System which integrates the existing satellite navigation (including IRNSS) and inertial navigation system (INS).

== See also ==
- List of main battle tanks by generation
- Arjun (tank) – (India)
- Zorawar (tank) – (India)
- Future Main Battle Tank – (India)
