= Eurosatory =

International weapons trade fair

- Begins: June 15, 2026
- Ends: June 19, 2026
- Frequency: Biennial: Even years
- Venue: Paris-Nord Villepinte Exhibition Centre
- Location: Paris France
- Inaugurated: 1967; 59 years ago
- Previous event: 2026
- Next event: 2028
- Participants: 2,032 exhibitors (2024)
- Attendance: 76,285 visitors (2024)
- Organiser: Coges Events
- Website: eurosatory.com

Eurosatory is a military industry exhibition held since 1967 in Paris, France. It is the largest international exhibition for the land and air-land defence and security industry in the world. The event takes place on even years, alternating with the Paris Air Show, and is currently held in the Paris-Nord Villepinte Exhibition Centre. It is organised by COGES Events, a subsidiary of GICAT.

In 2024, it had over 2000 exhibitors from 61 countries, 334 official delegations from 93 countries, and over 75,000 professional visitors from around the world. > Attendance and participation at the exhibition is for professionals only.

== Description ==
This exhibition presents products from the entire land and air-land defence and security industries, from raw materials to sub-assemblies and operational systems.

Vehicle products include tanks, armoured vehicles, and trucks. Small arms coverage ranges from guns to missiles to knives. There are exhibitors of communications systems, uniforms, logistics services, simulation, operational medicine, and disaster response. Security has been a major theme during recent shows, with monitoring, alert, and emergency responses solutions as well as civil security with the presence of firemen, among other institutions.

The exhibition is the largest of its kind worldwide. It is closed to the general public and reserved for professionals: exhibitors, institutions, government officials, industry professionals, all ranks of members of armed and security forces, and police and emergency units. Access is prohibited for people under the age of 16.

There are two parts of the exhibition: indoor and outdoor. A dynamic live demonstration zone has been created to show the real-life use of several devices such as vehicles, drones, and technical interventions. These demonstrations are organised twice a day and attract about 1,000 visitors.

== History ==
The first event was organised in 1967 by the French military procurement agency at Camp Satory in Versailles with 30 exhibitors. All the editions from Satory I to Satory X were held there.

In 1992 the exhibition became pan-European, taking the name Eurosatory, European Land Defence Exhibition, and moved to the Bourget Exhibition Centre, next to the Paris–Le Bourget Airport. In 1994, the United States exhibited for the first time, and most participants were from NATO countries. It went fully international in 1996 when manufacturers from the Russian Federation joined the exhibition.

In 2000, Eurosatory was renamed to "International Land and Air Defence Exhibition". From 2002 onward, it has been held in the Paris-Nord Villepinte Exhibition Centre.

The 2006 event had 1,083 exhibitors and 48,000 participants, 50% of which were international, according to the official website. According to the same source, 110 official delegations from 71 countries came to the event, including 450 VIPs, and 24 ministers. The 2008 event was one of the most successful in the history of the show, with 117 delegations, 52,500 visitors and 1,210 exhibitors and an exhibition space of 125,000m^{2}. Some delegates then had a dinner at the Louvre museum.

In 2010, emphasis was on operational medicine, UASs, and ground robots. It was attended by 1,327 exhibitors from 54 countries and 53,566 professionals. The 2012 event was dedicated to "Land Defense and Security". It placed an emphasis on cybersecurity by organizing the first forum Cyberdef-Cybersec. There were 1,432 exhibitors and 53,480 visitors.

In 2014, the Eurosatory exhibition brought together 1,507 exhibitors from 59 countries, more than 55,700 visitors and 172 official delegations. In 2016, the exhibition hosted 1,571 exhibitors from 57 countries, 65.5% of which were international. There were 57,024 professional visitors from 140 countries, 212 official delegations with 821 delegates, and 723 journalists from all around the world.

In 2018, Eurosatory presented a number of novelties: the opening of a third exhibition hall, the Eurosatory LAB presenting 65 French and foreign start-ups, the presence of institutions in the live demonstrations (GIGN, French Army, Prefecture de Police inter-services, and more), and a career day. The event had 1,802 exhibitors (65% international), 57,056 visitors including 227 official delegations.

After a four-year hiatus due to the COVID-19 health crisis, the 2022 International Exhibition for Land and Air-land Defence and Security took place on June 13–17, 2022. It was one of the most significant in the history of the exhibition, with the background of the Russia's war on Ukraine. 1,743 companies attended the event. There were 250 delegations from 96 countries, senior executives, public and private decision-makers and project leaders. For the first time, Emmanuel Macron, the President of France, inaugurated the show. Exhibitors and attendees from Russia and China were banned.

During the 2024 edition, France banned Israeli defence companies from exhibiting at the arms fair due to the Gaza war. The Jerusalem Post reported that the District Court in France then prohibited "any Israeli citizen or intermediary of an Israeli business" from visiting the exhibit. The Times of Israel said the ban would affect anyone working for or representing Israeli firms. The ban was overturned after Eurosatory 2024 started on June 18, 2024. French-German KMW+Nexter Defense Systems (KNDS) presented prototype of the "Enhanced Main Battle Tank (E-MBT)" of EMBT ADT140. and Leclerc Evolution.
