= KNDS =

French-German defence company

KNDS N.V.

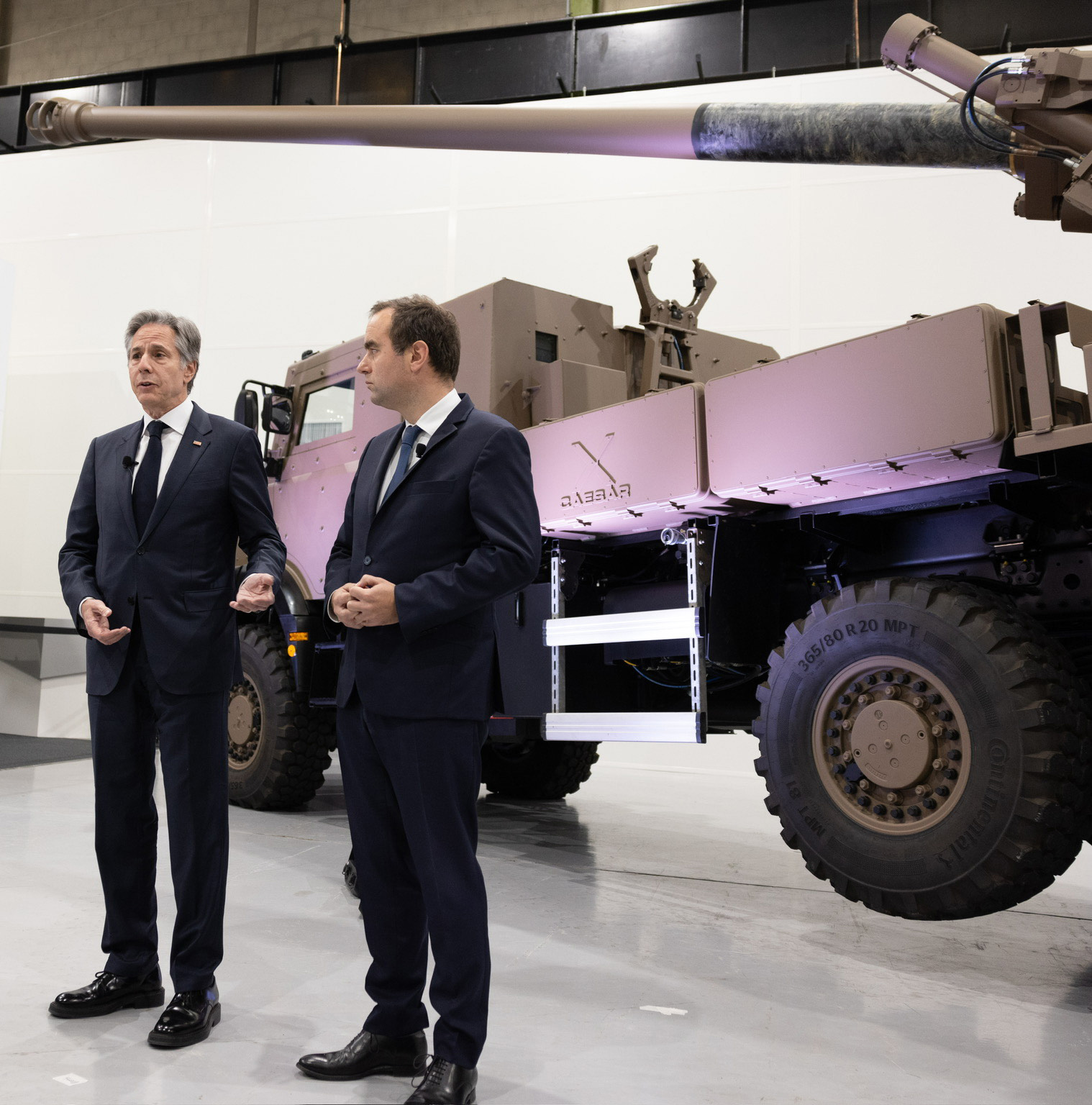
- Type: Private
- Industry: Defence
- Founded: December 15, 2015; 10 years ago
- Headquarters: Amsterdam, Netherlands
- Key people: Tom Enders (chairman); Jean-Paul Alary (CEO)
- Revenue: €3.8 billion (2024)
- Owners: Agence des participations de l'État (APE) (50%); Wegmann-Gruppe (50%)
- Number of employees: 11,000 (2025)
- Subsidiaries: KNDS Deutschland; KNDS France; KNDS UK
- Website: knds.com

KNDS N.V., (Note: According to the trade register maintained by the Dutch Chamber of Commerce, the company's legal name was KMW + Nexter Defense Systems N.V. from 6 July 2016 to 14 June 2023, and Honosthor N.V. from 2 October 2015 to 6 July 2016.) is a European defence industry holding company, which is the result of a merger between Krauss-Maffei Wegmann and Nexter Systems. The joint holding company is headquartered in Amsterdam, Netherlands.

== History ==
KNDS is the joint holding company formed by German family-controlled defence company Krauss-Maffei Wegmann (KMW) and the French government-owned weapons manufacturer Nexter, two of the leading European manufacturers of military land systems.

Negotiations between the companies and the German and French governments started in Summer 2014. Support for a merger was building in both Germany and France. Presenting the project to French lawmakers in January 2015, CEOs of both companies assumed that the new holding would boost production for both manufacturers by avoiding export restrictions, especially in Germany. In July 2015 the French National Assembly voted in favour of a measure that permits the privatisation of state-owned defence companies, paving the way for KMW and Nexter to join forces.

On 29 July 2015, the merger between the two companies was signed in Paris, in the presence of Ursula von der Leyen and Jean-Yves le Drian. It was remarked in 2015 that the corporate culture of Nexter led to outsourcing components, while that of KMW preferred to manufacture in-house. KMW made the PzH 2000, while Nexter made the CAESAR. The two merger firms complemented each other, instead of competing with each other. KMW brought along to the merger its subsidiary WFEL, a British company.

In December 2015, the merger was completed, when the supervisory board appointed the new CEO of Nexter Systems, Stéphane Mayer, and the chairman of the executive board of KMW, Frank Haun, as CEOs of the holding company.

In July 2016, the French press seemed content with the merger of the manufacturers of the Leopard 2 and Leclerc tanks, although it was disappointed that the combined company was still 25% of the size of General Dynamics or BAE Systems.

Prior to November 2018, the lead of the new Main Ground Combat System MBT was awarded to the German half of the firm, by decision of politicians in both France and Germany.

In November 2018, Rheinmetall was thinking of taking over the 50% share of the German holding company, after the death of Manfred Bode. In December 2018, it became apparent that Rheinmetall was seeking 75% of the whole KNDS company.

In 2020, the number of employees at KNDS and its subsidiaries was 8,270, with a turnover of €2.4 billion, an order backlog of around €10.6 billion and an order intake of €3.3 billion. Its products include main battle tanks, armored vehicles, artillery systems, weapons systems, ammunition, military bridges, customer services, battle management systems, training, protection and a wide range of equipment.

In 2023, KNDS decided to rename British subsidiary from WFEL (formerly Williams Fairey Engineering Limited) to KNDS UK.

As the Wegmann family decided to sell its stake in KNDS, the company management decided in 2025 to list the company in Frankfurt and Paris, through an IPO (initial public offering). In May 2026, the German government announced that it would acquire a 40% stake in KNDS when the company goes public and that the French and German government plans to reduce their stakes to 30% in the following years, in order for Germany and France to hold equal voting rights in KNDS.

In October 2026, Reuters reported that the government of Germany is in talks to acquire 50% stake in KNDS.The initial public offering has been put on hold.

== Products ==
In June 2018, the German and French ministries of defence signed a letter of intent for KNDS to develop the Main Ground Combat System (MGCS), a common main battle tank, and the Common Indirect Fire System, a common 155 mm self-propelled artillery gun.

KNDS tanks were able, as of 2024, to operate jointly with other ground, aerial and robotic vehicles through the use of multi-layer data networks. The main interface backbone is fully digital, via dual data bus and dual Ethernet, with a modular design, fully scalable and with an open upgradable architecture. All its functions are implemented in software. Thanks to the latest generation computing systems (hardware) high-performance calculations are implemented in real time, while there is availability of services in the whole range of high-speed data networks.

=== Leopard 2 upgrade ===
One of KNDS's first projects was upgrading the Leopard 2, with a focus on increasing effectiveness against contemporary threats like anti-tank guided missiles and the Russian T-14 Armata tank.

=== CAPINT ===
CAPINT (CAPacité INTermédiaire / Intermediary Capability) is a Main Battle Tank. Built on an enhanced chassis based on a Leopard 2 A8 latest version and a KNDS France ASCALON unmanned turret; CAPINT serves as KNDS’ proposal for France’s new armoured combat system. Unveiled at Eurosatory 2026, CAPINT is envisioned as an intermediate capability to bridge the gap between France's Leclerc XLRs and the eventual MGCS. It is envisioned as operating alongside unmanned ground vehicle 'wingmen', with notional roles including the counter-UAV and beyond line-of-sight attack missions.

=== Boxer AFV ===
Manufacture of the British Boxer AFV with an 8x8 chassis was sublicensed from WFEL, now KNDS UK, to MTL Advanced.

=== Military bridges ===
KNDS UK is able to build portable Dry Support Bridges, that can support the weight of a Challenger 3 MBT.
