= Trial of Strength =

Strategy board wargame

War on the Eastern Front, 1941 - 45
- Designers: David O'Connor; Steve Barnes; Peter Wyche
- Illustrators: Christopher Storey
- Publishers: Panther Games
- Publication: 1985
- Players: 2 or 2 teams
- Playing time: 5+ Hours – scenario; 50+ hours – campaign
- Age range: 16 and up
- Skills: Dice rolling Strategic thought Team play
- Website: www.panthergames.com

Trial of Strength, subtitled "War on the Eastern Front 1941–45", is a strategic level board wargame published by Australian company Panther Games in 1985 that is simulates combat on the Eastern Front of World War II by employing a novel and sophisticated integrated movement and combat system called CLIMACS.

== Background ==
On 22 June 1941, less than two years after signing the non-aggression Molotov–Ribbentrop Pact with the Soviet Union, Germany attacked across a wide front, with several strategic goals in mind: the capture of Moscow, Leningrad and Stalingrad, and the acquisition of the Caucasus oilfields and agricultural lands. Although the Germans exploited the element of surprise and quickly realized large geographical gains through the summer and fall of 1941, their offensive thrusts came to a halt short of their objectives due to their long supply lines and the oncoming winter. Although the German offenses picked up in 1942, Soviet counterattacks once again brought the German advances to a halt. By 1943, the tide turned with a major Soviet offensive that threw the Germans into a long retreat. In April 1945, Soviet forces occupied Berlin, bringing the war in Europe to an end.

== Description ==
Trial of Strength is a turn-based board wargame for two players, one controlling German forces and the other Soviet forces.

=== Components ===
The game box holds 800 counters; a 48-page rulebook; two 26" x 24" hex grid maps scaled at 72 kilometres (45 mi) per hex that run from Hannover in the west to Astrakhan in the east, and Baku in the south to North Cape, Norway in the north; and various player aids.

=== Gameplay ===
There are three turns per calendar month, representing about 10 days per turn. Designer David O'Connor's new game system, CLIMACS (Conventional Land-warfare, Integrated Movement and Combat System) integrates movement, combat, command and control, national morale, terrain, and supply and logistics..

=== Scenarios ===
In addition to a campaign game covering the entire Eastern Front from 1941 to 1945, the game includes three shorter scenarios, as well as a "mini-scenario", "Operation Blau", that simulates the Germans' 1942 summer offensive.

== Publication history ==
In 1985, Australian company Panther Games published their first game, Trial by Strength, a boxed set designed by David O'Connor, Steve Barnes and Peter Wyche. O'Connor, tired of other wargames' separate systems for movement, combat, command and control, etc., designed a system called CLIMACS to control everything, saying it "would simulate the interaction of forces and pay credence to the role of momentum." Panther published two more board games the following year — Warlords and Shanghai Trader, — before turning their attention to computer games like Fire Brigade.

== Reception ==
Issue 49 of Fire & Movement featured the game on its cover. Critic Peter Perla commented, "[Game designer O'Connor] has significantly advanced the state of the art of modeling the dynamics of warfare at the operational and strategic level. He has also created perhaps the most comprehensive and coherent treatment of the [Eastern] theater yet produced, Fire in the East not withstanding." However, after a thorough analysis, Perla concluded, "Trial of Strength is not for everyone. It is not an evening's entertainment nor a weekend's diversion ... It will almost certainly revolutionize boardgame approaches to this level of warfare. It is, quite simply, the best game ever produced on its subject."

Don Towers, writing for The V.I.P. of Gaming #2, warned that "ToS is not for beginners ... ToS edges into advanced [complexity]." Towers concluded, "The system looks good. The components of the system are not 'new', however, using the same ingredients, with different levels and types of spices and an original touch or two: ToS does show a strong promise."

The Australian wargaming magazine Breakout! featured two official extensions to the game, scenarios covering the Balkans in 1941 and Poland in 1939.

In a retrospective review in Issue 13 of Simulacrum, Michael Junkin commented, "So why is Trial of Strength special? Well, it comes from the land/air system ... This is, in my opinion, the revolutionary aspect of the game." After analysing the game, Junkin wrote, "All of this results in a very dynamic situation on the board, giving this strategic game a terrific operational feel." Junkin warned, "The game forces you to be flexible and anticipate failure; if you don't do this, you will often find yourself unable to exploit a promising result, or out of position to respond to adversity." Junkin concluded, "There's much more to talk about with this game ... but rather than spoil the surprise I'd like instead to recommend that you just pick up a copy of your own – you won't regret it."

== Awards ==
Trial of Strength was named "Australian Game of the Year" by Breakout! in 1985.

== Other recognition ==
A copy of Trial of Strength is held in the collection of the National Library of Australia (object 10524074).
