= Fire brigade (disambiguation) =

Fire brigade is an organization that provides firefighting services.

It may also refer to:

- Fire Brigade, a song
- Fire Brigade SC, a football club
- Fire-Brigade, a video game
