= Warlords: China in Disarray, 1916–1950 =

Wargame published in 1986

Warlords
- Cover art by Janet Patterson
- Designers: Steve Barnes; Dave O'Connor
- Publishers: Panther Games
- Publication: 1986
- Genres: 20th century Chinese civil war

Warlords: China in Disarray, 1916–1950 is a board wargame published by Panther Games in 1986 that simulates the series of civil wars that wracked China during the first part of the 20th century.

== Background ==
In 1912, after a century of foreign interference and puppet governments in China, Sun Yat-sen overthrew the Qing dynasty and established the Republic of China (ROC). But after the death of President Yuan Shikai in 1916, the country fractured, resulting in the Warlord Era, where feuding regional warlords and governors took power across China. In the 1920s, the Kuomintang under Chiang Kai-shek took control of much of the country, while the Chinese Communist Party (CCP) under Mao Zedong retreated to the north. After Japan invaded in the 1930s, the Kuomintang and the CCP became temporary allies against Japan. Following the war, the two enemies once again went to war against each other.

== Description ==
Warlords is a three- to seven-player wargame (depending on the scenario) where each player controls one of the factions vying for power.

=== Components ===
The game box holds a 16-page rulebook, a glossy four-colour 48 cm x 57 cm map showing China divided into its various provinces, 330 counters, and several players' aids.

=== Scenarios ===
The game offers three scenarios:

- 1916–1925: Four players control the four dominant warlords of the period (Wu, Feng, Sun and Chang).
- 1926–1935: Five or six players control the dominant factions of this period; if five players, then Kuomintang, Wu, Feng, Sun and Chang; if six players, then CCP enters the game in 1927.
- 1937–1950: Three players control the dominant powers of the period: CCP, Kuomintag, and Japanese. Starting in March 1944, a "6" on a die roll determines if the Japanese immediately surrender and withdraw from the game. Surrender is automatic in January 1947.

In addition, a campaign game combines all three scenarios and can be played by either six players (Kuomintang, Wu, Feng, Sun, Chang, Kuomintang and CCP), or by seven players (the seventh player controls the Japanese.)

=== Setup ===
Players agree on a scenario, then choose a faction.

=== Gameplay ===
Players must use a combination of diplomacy, supply management and military operations to win the game. Each game turn represent a year of game time, and is divided into a "Cycle Turn" and three Operations Turns.

==== Cycle Turn ====
Each Cycle Turn uses the following sequence:

1. Diplomacy Phase: Players gain political points for making an alliance, but lose them for breaking an alliance. Each player can only have one ally at a time, and cannot be allied with the Japanese player. Allies are able to utlilise combined operations by moving their units at the same time, and are not forced to fight each other if their units occupy the same province.
  1. Negotiations Segment: Like Diplomacy, players meet privately with other players.
  2. Declarations Segment: Each player then announce their alliance for the turn.
2. Famine Phase: The province suffering from famine is determined randomly, and its value is reduced.
3. Revolt Phase: Which provinces go into revolt is determined randomly.
4. Production Phase: Players gather resources from the provinces they control, and then spend them to maintain units and create new ones. Unspent resources are accrued and may be used during the Operations Phase to keep armies in supply.

==== Operations Turn ====
There are three Operations Turns each game turn, which all use the following sequence:

1. Events may occur.
2. Initiative order is determined by a faction's position on the political status track. If the Japanese are operational, they always are first in initiative. The faction with the highest initiative may choose to go anywhere in the turn order.
3. Player turn: Each player, in initiative order (or when the player with the highest initiative decides to go), does the following:
  1. Checks the supply status of their armies. (The player can spend excess resources to move and fight. Otherwise units must stay where they are to forage, and then might be able to move and fight.)
  2. Movement
  3. Combat

=== Victory conditions ===
There are two ways to win:

1. If one player controls 16 provinces including the province containing Peking, victory is immediate.
2. At the end of the game, each player is given an ordinal ranking (1st, 2nd, 3rd, etc.) in Economic (total of controlled provinces and money), Political (placement on the Political Track), and Military (total number of troops on hand). These three numbers are totalled, and the player with the highest total is the winner.

== Publication history ==
Panther Games was founded in 1985 by David O'Connor in Canberra, Australia in order to publish Connor's board wargame Trial of Strength. Panther then published two other wargames the following year: Warlords, with cover art by Janet Patterson, and Shanghai Trader. Panther then turned to publishing computer games.

== Reception ==
In Issue 28 of the Australian game magazine Queensland Wargamer, Timo Nieminen noted "It looks quite good — how can you go wrong for $10?" Nieminen concluded, "If you like that kind of strategic level game, or are interested in the period, try it."

Nigel Slater, writing for the Australian wargaming magazine Breakout!, liked the "eye-catching" cover by Janet Patterson. Slater found that combat was "quite volatile ... it can cause a very rapid turnover in the fortunes of players" and warned "The first few games will be marred by mistakes and fumbles — the rules are a little fuzzy in places and careful reading is mandatory." Slater concluded, "If you like multi-player games, then this will be enjoyable. If you are into heavy historical recreations, this will not provide it."

The full tournament rules for Warlords were printed in the inaugural issue of Battleplan, as well as the announcement about a contest: The winner of the Warlords tournament at the GAMES '87 convention in Melbourne, Australia would win a trip to Origins '87 in Baltimore to participate in a second Warlords tournament. The winner of the second tournament would win a trip the following summer to GAMES '88 in Australia to play in a third Warlords tournament.
