= Panther Games =

Australian video game developer

Panther Games Pty Ltd
- Type: Proprietary company
- Industry: Video games
- Founded: 1985
- Founder: David O'Connor
- Headquarters: Canberra, Australia
- Key people: David O'Connor, President; Paul Scobell, UI Developer
- Products: Trial of Strength; Fire Brigade; Airborne Assault: Conquest of the Aegean; Command Ops: Battles from the Bulge
- Website: www.panthergames.com

Panther Games Pty Ltd (Panther Games) is an Australian games developer, best known for the WWII Airborne Assault and Command Ops PC video game series. Panther Games specialises in developing operational level wargames for the PC Wargame market.

== History ==
Panther Games was founded in 1985 by David O’Connor in Canberra, Australia.

In the early years Panther Games initially focused on developing and producing board games and released three in the mid-1980s: Trial of Strength, Shanghai Trader, and Warlords.

The company shifted their focus to developing video games in the late 1980s with the release of the computer wargame, Fire Brigade, in 1988 for Mac, MS-DOS, Atari ST, and Amiga.

Following the success of Fire Brigade, Panther Games released of sci-fi adventure Alien Drug Lords and puzzle video game Cubit in 1991.

In 1996 Panther Games decided to return to its wargame roots and instigated development of a new real-time computer game engine for a novel operational wargame series to be called Airborne Assault (AA).The use of a real-time engine without a hexagon grid for a wargame was novel as traditional computer wargames run on a turn-based system where there are dedicated phases for planning, movement and engagement. The AA engine (later rebranded Command Ops) allowed for planning, movement and engagement to be played in continues time and the hexagon grid was no longer needed to determine movement capabilities of units. Panther Games' AA game engine and the associated AI capabilities has notably been referenced in publications by Peter Perla at Center for Naval Analyses (CNA), Michael Peck at Defence News and the Digital Humanities at King's College London.

The first title to be produced in the series was Airborne Assault: Red Devils over Arnhem (RDOA) and was released in 2002 through wargame publisher battlefront.com. However, in Europe, Panther Games used a different publisher, CDV Software Entertainment AG, and the title for the game was simply Airborne Assault.

The second and third instalments of the AA series were released through a new publisher, Matrix Games, with Airborne Assault: Highway to the Reich (HTTR) coming out in 2003 and Airborne Assault: Conquest of the Aegean (COTA) in 2006.

In 2010, Panther Games rebranded their long running games series to Command Ops and released their latest title, Command Ops: Battles from the Bulge (BFTB).

In 2012, the first official expansion pack Panther Games has ever released came out titled, Command Ops: Highway to the Reich. This is an expansion pack for BFTB and covers content from the original two AA games.

18 October 2014, Panther Games in conjunction with Lock 'n Load publishing jointly announce Panther Games' move to Lock 'n Load publishing following the split between Panther games and Matrix Games. Following the announcement it was revealed Panther Games through Lock n' Load would be re-releasing Panther Games' successful 1985 board game Trial of Strength with a new edition. it would be the first time the board game has been re-released since its initial release in 1985. In addition, it was revealed Panther Games' new game engine, Command Ops 2, would be released through the publisher along with all subsequent data packs for the engine. This represented a new method of content delivery for the company.

June 2015, Command Ops 2 goes public beta and the "Commander Pack" consisting of all five modular data packs for Command Ops 2 goes on sale 16 June 2015.

=== Professional services to the military ===
Parallel to its commercial wargame development, Panther Games also provides professional services to the military. Simulation Australia (part of the Australian Department of innovation, Industry, Science and Research) describe Panther Games' professional services capabilities to include wargame design and development; artificial intelligence; user interface; programming; scenario development (including for JSAF); Puckstering (for JSAF) and a wide range of Analysis.

In 2007, Panther Games was a team partner along with Booz Allen Hamilton, Ball Solutions, CAE and Calytrix Technology in the successful Joint Decision Support and Simulations Centre (JDSSC) project for the Australian Department of Defence.

In 2009, Panther Games became an associate member of the joint Defence-Industry initiative, Rapid Prototyping, Development and Evaluation Program (RPDE).

In October 2010, Panther Games began a four-month scoping study for the Australian Defence Simulation Office (ADSO) to determine the Defence requirements for a course of action analyser simulation tool.

== Games ==
=== Board Games ===
- Trial of Strength (1985)
- Warlords: China in Disarray, 1916–1950 (1986)
- Shanghai Trader (1986)

=== Computer Games ===
- Fire Brigade (1988)
- Alien Drug Lords (1991)
- Cubit (1991)
- Airborne Assault: Red Devils over Arnhem (2002)
- Airborne Assault: Highway to the Reich (2003)
- Airborne Assault: Conquest of the Aegean (2006)
- Command Ops: Battles from the Bulge (2010)
  - Command Ops: Highway to the Reich (2012) – expansion to BFTB
  - Command Ops: Battles for Greece (2013) - expansion to BFTB
- Command Ops 2 (2015)
  - Command Ops 2: Bastogne (2015)
  - Command Ops 2: Foothills of the Gods (2015)
  - Command Ops 2: Highway to the Reich (2015)
  - Command Ops 2: Knock On All Doors (2015)
  - Command Ops 2: Ride of the Valkyries (2015)
  - Command Ops 2: The Cauldron (2015)
  - Command Ops 2: Westwall (2015)
