= Deployable Virtual Training Environment =

The Deployable Virtual Training Environment (DVTE) is a laptop based platform for a wide variety of training simulations in the USMC. DVTE consists of two main components, the Combined Arms Network (CAN) and the Infantry Tool Kit (ITK). A typical DVTE suite consists of 32 laptops and a modified NVisor SX Head-mounted display (HMD).

The current version of the CAN was developed by the ONR VIRTE program as part of its Demo 3 and is based on the JSAF simulation. It uses the Open Source Delta3D toolkit for visualization. Each laptop can be reconfigured to simulate a variety of USMC platforms including the M1 Abrams, Amphibious Assault Vehicle (AAV), LAV-25, AV-8 Harrier II, and the AH-1 Cobra.

The Infantry Tool Kit consists of a number of stand-alone games and simulations. The main simulation is a first-person shooter called VBS2. Other applications include: the DARPA-developed DARWARS Tactical Iraqi (part of the Tactical Language & Culture Training System family) and the ONR developed Close Combat: Marines, MAGTF XXI, and TacOps MC. The Pointman user interface has recently been integrated with VBS to enhance infantry training.
