= Advanced Concept Technology Demonstration =

Type of testing program by the United States military

Advanced Concept Technology Demonstration program
- Active: 1994–2006 (or FY95–FY07) (Note: FY07 ACTD planning had happened two years in advance, from candidacy in Dec. 2005 to Sept 2006 approval, in time for activation just before FY07 (i.e. Oct. 2006 to Sept 2007).)
- Branch: Used by United States Army, Marine Corps, Navy, and Air Force
- Type: Defense acquisition program
- Role: Reduce time to field improved technology, incorporate user into development process

The Advanced Concept Technology Demonstration (ACTD) program was a Department of Defense research and evaluation initiative for mature, advanced technology for United States military usage. These demonstrations allowed for cheaper and earlier evaluation of technology and systems than the formal acquisition process.

An ACTD must be sponsored by an operational user, with approval and oversight from the now-terminated role of Deputy Under Secretary of Defense for Advanced Systems and Concepts, or DUSD(AS&C), previously titled the Deputy USD for Advanced Technology, or DUSD(AT).

The follow-on Joint Capability Technology Demonstration (JCTD) program was initiated by the deputy under-secretary in 2005. The new JCTD framework emphasized multiservice technology development and improvements in planning. ACTDs were replaced by JCTDs during about a three-year span from 2005 to 2008. During 2006, the final round of ACTDs were up for selection, and in September 2006 the winning projects received their formal approval. All remaining ACTDs continued to be funded, though, and were expected to conclude by 2008.

== Lists of selected programs ==
The following lists of ACTDs are separated into which year they were selected and approved during.

=== Fiscal year 1995 ===
ACTDs Selected in Fiscal Year 1995
Fiscal Year	#	Title	Class*	Total Expected Cost (1995–2003: mil, K)	User/Sponsor	Lead Service or Agency
Oct. 1994 (FY 1995)	1	Advanced Joint Planning	I	40.5m (Note: Includes $5.2 million added from fiscal year 1996 funds, i.e. the next year.)	US Atlantic Command	Defense Information Systems Agency
Oct. 1994 (FY 1995)	2	Cruise Missile Defense, Phase I	III	74.2m	US Pacific Command	Navy
Oct. 1994 (FY 1995)	3	High-Altitude Endurance UAV	II	922.6m	US Atlantic Command	Air Force
Oct. 1994 (FY 1995)	4	Joint Countermine	III	402.1m	US Atlantic Command	Navy
Oct. 1994 (FY 1995)	5	Kinetic Energy Boost- Phase Intercept	II	40.0m	Air Combat Command	Air Force
Oct. 1994 (FY 1995)	6	Low-Life-Cycle-Cost Medium-Lift Helicopter	II	800K	Military Sealift Command	Navy
Oct. 1994 (FY 1995)	7	Medium-Altitude Endurance UAV (Predator)	II	128.4m	US Atlantic Command	Air Force
Oct. 1994 (FY 1995)	8	Precision/Rapid Counter-MRL	III	86.3m	US Forces Korea	Army
Oct. 1994 (FY 1995)	9	Precision SIGINT Targeting System	I	45.4m	US Forces Korea	Navy
Oct. 1994 (FY 1995)	10	Rapid Force Projection Initiative	III	567.8m	XVIIIth Airborne Corps	Army
Oct. 1994 (FY 1995)	11	Synthetic Theater of War	I	174.2m (Note: Excludes an additional $4.6 million to be provided by the United Kingdom.)	US Atlantic Command	None
Oct. 1994 (FY 1995)		*Class I = software development projects; class II = traditional platforms; class III = systems-of-systems Abbreviations: UAV - Unmanned aerial vehicle; MRL - Multiple rocket launcher; SIGINT - Signals intelligence				

=== Fiscal year 1996 ===
ACTDs Selected in Fiscal Year 1996
Fiscal Year	#	Title	Class*	Total Expected Cost (1995–2003: mil, K)	User/Sponsor	Lead Service or Agency
Oct. 1995 (FY 1996)	1	Air Base/Port Biological Detection	III	19.7m	US Central Command, US Pacific Command	Army
Oct. 1995 (FY 1996)	2	Battlefield Awareness and Data Dissemination	I	113.4m	US Atlantic Command	Defense Information Systems Agency
Oct. 1995 (FY 1996)	3	Combat Identification	II	92.7m	US Atlantic Command	Army
Oct. 1995 (FY 1996)	4	Combat Vehicle Survivability	II	48.6m	III Corps	Army
Oct. 1995 (FY 1996)	5	Counterproliferation I	III	123.3m	US European Command	Air Force, Defense Special Weapons Agency (DSWA)
Oct. 1995 (FY 1996)	6	Counter Sniper	II	1.0m	US Army Infantry School	Army
Oct. 1995 (FY 1996)	7	Joint Logistics	I	168.3m	US Atlantic Command, US European Command	Navy
Oct. 1995 (FY 1996)	8	Miniature Air-launched Decoy	II	45.0m	Air Combat Command	Air Force
Oct. 1995 (FY 1996)	9	Navigation Warfare	II	83.4m	US Atlantic Command	Air Force
Oct. 1995 (FY 1996)	10	Semi-Automated IMINT Processing	I	123.2m	US Atlantic Command	Army, Air Force, DARPA, National Imagery and Mapping Agency (NIMA)
Oct. 1995 (FY 1996)	11	Tactical High-Energy Laser	II	117.1m (Note: Excludes an additional $64.7 million to be provided by Israel.)	Israeli Ministry of Defense	Israel
Oct. 1995 (FY 1996)	12	Tactical UAV program	II	131.3m	Army, Navy, Marine Corps	Army
Oct. 1995 (FY 1996)		*Class I = software development projects; class II = traditional platforms; class III = systems-of-systems Abbreviations: UAV - Unmanned aerial vehicle; IMINT - Imagery intelligence				

=== Fiscal year 1997 ===
ACTDs Selected in Fiscal Year 1997
Fiscal Year	#	Title	Class*	Total Expected Cost (1995–2003: mil, K)	User/Sponsor	Lead Service or Agency
Oct. 1996 (FY 1997)	1	Chemical Add-On to Air Base/Port Biological Detection	III	3.2m	US Central Command, US Pacific Command	Army
Oct. 1996 (FY 1997)	2	Consequence Management	II	3.2m	Army, Marine Corps	Army, Marine Corps
Oct. 1996 (FY 1997)	3	Counter- proliferation II	III	303.0m	US European Command	Air Force, Navy
Oct. 1996 (FY 1997)	4	Extending the Littoral Battlespace	III	137.7m	US Pacific Command	Marine Corps
Oct. 1996 (FY 1997)	5	Information Operations Planning Tool	I	55.1m	US Central Command	Air Force
Oct. 1996 (FY 1997)	6	Integrated Collection Management	I	12.2m	US Atlantic Command	Defense Intelligence Agency (DIA)
Oct. 1996 (FY 1997)	7	Joint Advanced Health and Usage Monitoring System	II	15.5m	n.a.	Navy
Oct. 1996 (FY 1997)	8	Military Operations in Urban Terrain	III	71.9m	US Special Operations Command (USSOCOM)	Army
Oct. 1996 (FY 1997)	9	Rapid Terrain Visualization	II	54.6m	XVIIIth Airborne Corps	Army
Oct. 1996 (FY 1997)		*Class I = software development projects; class II = traditional platforms; class III = systems-of-systems Abbreviations: n.a. - not applicable				

=== Fiscal year 1998 ===
ACTDs Selected in Fiscal Year 1998
Fiscal Year	#	Title	Class*	Total Expected Cost (1995–2003: mil, K)	User/Sponsor	Lead Service or Agency
Oct. 1997 (FY 1998)	1	Adaptive Course of Action	I	19.3m	US Atlantic Command, US Pacific Command	Defense Information Systems Agency
Oct. 1997 (FY 1998)	2	C4I for Coalition Warfare	I	20.0m	US European Command	Army
Oct. 1997 (FY 1998)	3	High Power Microwave	II	2.0m	US European Command	Army
Oct. 1997 (FY 1998)	4	Information Assur- ance: Automated Intrusion Detection Environment	I	75.1m	US Strategic Command	Defense Information Systems Agency
Oct. 1997 (FY 1998)	5	Joint Biological Remote Early Warning System	III	125.7m	US European Command	Army
Oct. 1997 (FY 1998)	6	Joint Continuous Strike Environment	I	15.9m	US European Command	Defense Information Systems Agency
Oct. 1997 (FY 1998)	7	Joint Modular Lighter System	II	26.5m	US Atlantic Command	Navy
Oct. 1997 (FY 1998)	8	Line-of-Sight Anti- tank	II	257.9m	US Central Command	Army
Oct. 1997 (FY 1998)	9	Link 16 (tactical data network for NATO)	I	3.3m	US Atlantic Command	Navy
Oct. 1997 (FY 1998)	10	Migration Defense Intelligence Threat Data System	I	11.4m	US European Command	Defense Intelligence Agency (DIA)
Oct. 1997 (FY 1998)	11	Precision Targeting Identification	II	23.0m (Note: Excludes an additional $2.4 million to be provided by the United Kingdom.)	JIATF East (Joint Inter- agency Task Force East)	Navy
Oct. 1997 (FY 1998)	12	Space-Based Space Surveillance Operations	I	21.5m	US Space Command	Air Force
Oct. 1997 (FY 1998)	13	Theater Precision Strike Operations	I	93.4m	US Forces Korea	Army
Oct. 1997 (FY 1998)	14	Unattended Ground Sensors	II	20.8m	US Central Command, US Special Operations Command (USSOCOM)	Air Force
Oct. 1997 (FY 1998)		*Class I = software development projects; class II = traditional platforms; class III = systems-of-systems Abbreviations: C4I - command, control, communication, computers, and intelligence				

Although not represented in this section, additional ACTDs indeed followed those listed above (during FY 1999–2006).

== Congressional Budget Office assessments ==
Some of the Congressional Budget Office assessments, such as the CBO 1998 Memorandum, reviewed the ACTD program's progress since its initiation in 1994 up until the 1998 assessment. The memorandum summarized the results as "From 1995 through 1998, DoD has spent $3.2 billion on 46 ACTDs. The $3.2 billion represents about 2 percent of DoD’s entire budget for research and development during that time." The memorandum provided some details about the 46 ACTDs as of 1998, and highlighted the Medium-Altitude Endurance UAV (the Predator drone) as on its then successes, having transitioned into a formal DOD Acquisition Program.

== Outcomes ==
The following programs were completed under the Advanced Concept Technology Demonstration framework:

- Global Hawk
- JSTOW ACTD as part of Joint Semi-Automated Forces
- DarkStar
- JPADS

== See also ==
- The Technical Cooperation Program (TTCP) – An international defense science and technology collaboration between Australia, Canada, New Zealand, the United Kingdom and the United States.
