= VIRTE =

VIRtual Training and Environments (VIRTE) was an Office of Naval Research Science and Technology program that ran from at least the late 90's to 2007, led by CDR Dylan Schmorrow. It was funded under the Capable Manpower Future Naval Capability (FNC) and produced research in Virtual Environments. The VIRTE program was divided into three related demonstrations. Demo 1 developed virtual simulators for the LCAC, the EFV, and the Osprey. Demo 2 concentrated on technologies to support Immersive Infantry Training. Demo 3 developed laptop based simulators for a wide variety of USMC platforms and was fielded as part of the Deployable Virtual Training Environment (DVTE). The VIRTE program aimed to produce a variety of simulation levels, from basic simulations that utilized low cost widely available components, and high end simulators that allowed for complex simulation. By the end of the program however, the technology of the time only allowed for certain skills to be practiced on certain simulators, for example the marksmanship simulator was separate from simulators intended more for movement around an environment, owing to the difficulty in combining precision with accurate locomotion simulators.

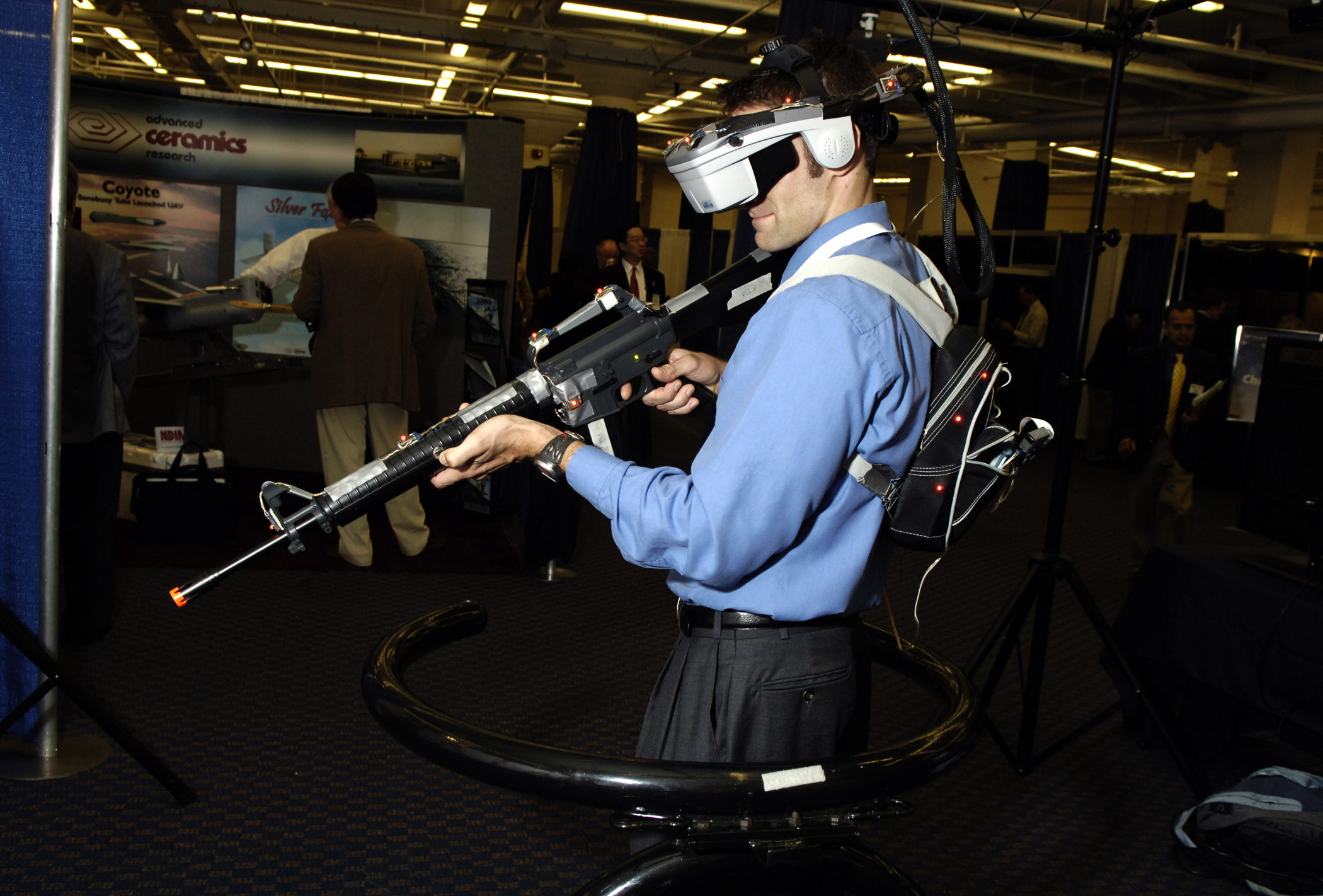
Joe Coyne, an engineer research psychologist at the Naval Research Laboratory (NRL), demonstrates the Infantry Immersive Trainer (IIT), one of several Virtual Training Environment projects.

== Facts ==
It was funded under the "Capable Manpower Future Naval Capability (FNC)" initiative. Developed virtual simulators for specific military vehicles, including the Landing Craft Air Cushion (LCAC), the Expeditionary Fighting Vehicle (EFV), and the Bell Boeing V-22 Osprey.

== Demo 2 ==
Demo 2 was the demo focused on creating immersive training environments for infantry. Since the 1980's, the U.S. military had been conducting "interactive Videodisc instruction" and found this to be more effective and less costly than solely traditional instruction. By the early 2000's, this technological approach to training had evolved with the times, and training was now being conducted in virtual environments. While by that point technology now allowed for realtime simulated environments, with head mounted displays in particular, it was noted that there were particular challenges in creating simulations that reached effective levels of resolution, frame rate, and field of view while still allowing for a sensorimotor component. Lag, spatial jitter, and decreased frame rate could all create issues that would impact the effectiveness of the virtual training, so particular care was given to address and control when possible these issues.
