= Command Ops: Battles from the Bulge =

2010 video game

- Developer: Panther Games Pty Ltd
- Publisher: Matrix Games
- Designer: David O'Connor
- Programmers: Paul Scobell (UI); David O'Connor (AI); Miquel Ramirez (AI)
- Engine: Command Ops
- Platform: Microsoft Windows
- Release: 26 May 2010 (worldwide)
- Genre: Computer Wargame
- Modes: Single player Multiplayer

Command Ops: Battle from the Bulge (commonly abbreviated BFTB) is a strategic command level computer wargame developed and by Panther Games in Australia and published by Matrix Games in 2010. The game is set around the historical WWII Western Front German offensive and Allied counter-offensive of 1944-45 launched through the Ardennes mountain region of Belgium, France and Luxembourg.

== Synopsis ==
During the bitter cold of winter just before Christmas, 1944, Nazi Germany launched their last major Western Front offensive of the Second World War, Unternehmen Wacht am Rhein ("Operation Watch on the Rhine"). The goal was to break the Allied line and push to Antwerp, Belgium. This would cut off the Allied forces to the north and force the Allied commanders to consider peace terms, allowing Nazi Germany to concentrate on the war on the Eastern Front with the Soviet Union.

The offensive caught the Allied forces by surprise as they too were developing and in the stages of implementing their own offensive plans to break the German line. The Allies had to re-evaluate and re-deploy their armies from the north shoulder to counter the offensive without air-support initially as poor weather conditions grounded the air force until conditions improved a few days later. Once the Allied air force was operational the Allied counter-offensive overwhelmed the German supply-lines, crippling the offensive and ensuring a German retreat.

== Gameplay ==
Command Ops: Battle from the Bulge is an operational Command level wargame played through a pausable real-time game engine that puts the player in the shoes of a Corps, Division and Brigade commander as you examine your intelligence and operational information, make your plans and deliver your orders to your subordinates.

The game stretches over twenty seven scenarios and maps that cover events and battles from the original German offensive right through to the Allied counter-offensive. The game allows for endless re-playability with a number of changeable scenario options including multiple random reinforcement schedules.

Players have the choice to micromanage their units or utilise the game's AI to macro-manage their armies as the game's AI can manage subordinate commanders and handle micromanagement for you. This sophistication enables you more time to strategies and assess your situation and to formulate the best plans going forward to achieve your objectives and claim ultimate victory over your enemy. However, if micromanagement is your thing you can still issue orders to individual battalions (units). Units have a number of can be adjustable parameters, including aggressiveness, rates of fire, loss tolerance, frontage and depth, as well as eight different adjustable formations, from road column to arrowhead attack.

The menu of commands a player has at their disposal is simple enough for a player to get right into the action: move, fire, bombard, seize bridge crossings and so on. Set the objective and the waypoints, and then sit back and watch the action as your plans are put through their paces. The AI will assemble and move troops according to historical (and sensible) doctrine for both the Allies and the Germans.

Game functionality such as timing controls for coordinated tasks; realistic orders delay; automated bridge building; multiple re-supply priority settings; order of battle display; adjustable automated units and a whole lot more provides the player with an arsenal of tools and information to defeat your enemy on the battlefield, either the computer AI in single player mode or your mate in multiplayer head to head.

== Reception ==
BFTB has received favourable reviews from online and print media publications as well as a number of awards:

Eurogamer.dk (3 June 2010) 9/10 – [Translated from Danish] ...a competent and flawless release that makes an already excellent war game even better.

Cyberstratège (29 June 2010) 8/10 – [translated from French] ...it manages to be extremely innovative and has no real competition in its field with its innovative design choices.

Gamers Hall (9 June 2010) 88% (Silver Award) – [Translated from German] "From The Bulge" is an intricate and comprehensive strategy... and a clear recommendation for hardcore gamers.

PC Gamer (10 August 2010) 84% – Serious military strategy games don't come any better than this.

PC4WAR magazine (August – September 2010, N°45 edition) 9.5/10 – [translated from French] ... Battles from the Bulge is the best wargame on the actual market!

Armchair General (27 September 2010) 97% – Many games have the various elements Command Ops: Battles from the Bulge has such as, detailed unit features, timed objectives, issuing orders in a queue to upper echelon entities. However, Panther Games integrates them in such a way that this game sets the standard for all World War II tactical games

=== Awards ===
2010 – Wargame of the Year Gold – Usenet's War-Historical newsgroup
2010 – Best 20th Century Computer Game finalist – Charles S. Roberts Awards

== Expansions ==
=== Command Ops: Highway to the Reich ===
On 26 January 2012, Panther Games released the first official expansion pack for BFTB. Command Ops: Highway to the Reich consists of thirteen scenarios and content covered in the original two Airborne Assault titles Panther Games released (RDOA & HTTR), with these scenarios being upgraded to take advantage of the new Command Ops engine. This expansion pack covers all the major engagements along Hell's Highway during the Market Garden Campaign in the Netherlands, September 1944.

Command Ops: Highway to the Reich has won:

2012 – Wargame of the Year Silver – Usenet's War-Historical newsgroup

=== Command Ops: Conquest of the Aegean ===
On 22 April 2013, Panther Games revealed on their forum that they will be splitting the development of their new planned expansion pack for BFTB that will cover Conquest of the Aegean into two scenario packs covering the two theatres of war for the region.

Pack one will consist of twenty scenarios and will cover Greece, and pack two will consist of fifteen scenarios and will cover the Mediterranean.

On 20 June 2013, the second expansion pack was officially released worldwide for digital download and boxed editions. Command Ops: Battles for Greece features nineteen historical and what-if scenarios covering the major battles of the early Italian invasion of Greece and the German invasion, Operation Marita, in 1941.
