= Airborne Assault: Highway to the Reich =

2003 video game

- Developer: Panther Games
- Publisher: Matrix Games
- Platform: Windows
- Release: July 2003
- Genre: FPS

Airborne Assault: Highway to the Reich is a video game released in 2003.

== Release ==
Airborne Assault: Highway to the Reich was released by Panther Games and Matrix Games on 1 December 2003.

== Reception ==
Reception

Review scores
Publication	Score
GameSpy	4/5
Computer Gaming World	4.5/5
GameSpot	8.1/10
PC Gamer	89%

Its unit-level artificial intelligence was praised as allowing "competent execution by groups of forces in pursuit of terrain-based objectives".

The editors of Computer Gaming World nominated Highway to the Reich's computer version for their 2003 "Wargame of the Year" award, which ultimately went to Decisive Battles of WWII: Korsun Pocket. They wrote, "Highway to the Reich shows that war gaming is moving in exciting new directions".
