= Dylan Schmorrow =

Chief Science Officer, SOAR Technology

Personal details
- Education: Naval Postgraduate School; Western Michigan University; Georgetown University

Dylan Schmorrow is an American scientist and retired United States Defense Official. He is currently the chief scientist at Soar Technology, Inc.. He is a retired US Navy captain, and served as the deputy director of the Human Performance, Training, and BioSystems Research Directorate at the Office of the Assistant Secretary of Defense, Research & Engineering (ASD(R&E)) at Office of the Secretary of Defense. He was also specialty leader of the Aerospace Experimental Psychologist community and an acquisition professional in the Naval Acquisition Corps.

He has previously served as the executive assistant to the Chief of Naval Research at the Office of Naval Research. He was instrumental in expanding the field of Augmented Cognition as a DARPA program manager. He was also a key developer of Virtual Environment Technology as PM of the VIRTE (Virtual Technologies and Environments) program. He led the development of the Amphibious Assault Vehicle Turret Trainer project.

Schmorrow was the recipient of the first Leland S. Kollmorgen Spirit of Innovation award presented by the Human Factors and Ergonomics Society (HFES) which was presented at the Fourth Augmented Cognition International Conference in Baltimore on October 2, 2007 on May 29, 2008, at a ceremony at the Pentagon, CAPT Schmorrow was awarded the Department of the Navy Top Scientists and Engineers of the Year Awards for 2007 for his work on the Infantry Immersion Trainer Navy Top Scientist. He has published numerous papers in the scholarly literature, chaired multiple DoD conferences, and given a TedX talk on the future of Augmented Cognition.

== Early life and education ==
Schmorrow grew up in Michigan. Following high school, Schmorrow enrolled in Western Michigan University (WMU) where he graduated in 1989 with degrees in both economics and psychology. After completing his undergraduate work, Schmorrow enrolled in the graduate school at WMU, where he completed two master's degrees (experimental psychology, 1990; philosophy, 1993) and a PhD (experimental psychology, 1993). His primary research interests were understanding behavior, schedules of reinforcement, and the philosophy of science. His doctoral dissertation examined research and theory on the housing and care of laboratory pigeons and rats. He defended his dissertation and joined the U.S. Navy in May 1993. In addition to his primary graduate work, Schmorrow has also earned degrees in Modeling, Virtual Environments, and Simulation (M.S., Naval Postgraduate School, 1998) and Operations Research (M.S. Naval Postgraduate School, 1998). He also completed postdoctoral fellowships at both the Naval Postgraduate School (Jenkins Postdoctoral Fellow, 1998) and Georgetown University (Experimental Psychology, 1992).

== Early career ==
Schmorrow joined the U.S. Navy's Medical Service Corps Aerospace Experimental Psychology (AEP) community in 1993 and was directly commissioned as a Lieutenant (O-3). Upon his accession Schmorrow attended Officer Indoctrination School (OIS, now Officer Development School) in Newport Rhode Island. He was immediately made the company division officer and won academic, military and physical fitness honors by the conclusion of this initial training. After OIS, Schmorrow moved to Pensacola Florida for flight training where he was a distinguished student completing flight training with a 93.14% cumulative grade point average and won the highly competitive Medical Service Corps' "Fox Flag" award in recognition of demonstrated excellence in leadership, cooperation, flight aptitude and scholastic achievement during the course in Aerospace Experimental Psychology. During his time in Pensacola, Schmorrow also completed a cockpit assessment of the T-39 Intermediate Flight Trainer for the local training air wing. His assessment earned him a Flag Letter of Commendation from the training wing.

After completing flight training in Pensacola, Schmorrow was assigned to Naval Air Station Patuxent River, where he worked at Naval Air System Command (NAVAIR). Schmorrow conducted research on and within the human centrifuge (which often spun him to 10gs). This experience brought Schmorrow into close proximity with the history of U.S. space exploration. He once explained that during his work he opened a storage unit and found himself in the presence of a substantial amount of equipment from the original Mercury Space Program. Schmorrow was described by his then NAVAIR commanding officer as "a superior performer with unparalleled productivity, adaptability, and career trajectory." Schmorrow served as the Branch head of the biomedical support branch and as an acceleration research project officer in the crew systems department where he executed human system integration acceleration research that focused on human factors, human performance, aviation safety, physiology, and general human system integration research. During this time he also deployed to the USS Dwight D. Eisenhower in support of Operations in the Former Yugoslavia and performed field research involving the scientific collection of work, rest, stress, and fatigue data from flight deck crew-members to support optimal manning and crew management decisions.

Schmorrow's next post was at the Naval Postgraduate School (NPS) where he was both an assistant professor and a student. In addition to teaching graduate level courses on topics such as aviation safety, C4ISR, and National Security Affairs he served as the John G. Jenkins Postdoctoral Fellow in applied cognitive research where he explored the use of advanced quantitative assessment techniques including stochastic processes, computational programming, optimization, mathematical modeling, and simulation for military applications. His activities included integrating and applying advanced quantitative methods with current technologies to study human behavior and examined the relationship between people and technology. In his student role, Schmorrow completed two additional master's degrees (see above: Operations Research, 1998; Modeling, Virtual Environments, and Simulation, 1998). In 2012, the Naval Postgraduate School awarded him the NPS Distinguished Alumni Award in recognition of demonstrated leadership in the international scientific community as well as for a continued pursuit of excellence and academic prowess in advancing human performance research and establishing numerous collaborations between government organizations.

Not long after completing his time at NPS, Schmorrow was transferred to the U.S. Naval Research Laboratory (NRL) in Washington D.C. NRL is the corporate laboratory of the U.S. Navy and Marine Corps and operates under the Office of Naval Research. Within the AEP community, NRL is one of the premier assignments for Junior Officers and is generally awarded to top performers. While at NRL, Schmorrow not only conducted bench level research, he also ran research programs out of both the Office of Naval Research and the Defense Advanced Research Projects Agency (DARPA). AT NRL, he served as chief scientist for Human-Technology Integration in the Information Technology Division. He conducted human systems and information science and technology research focused on advancing virtual environments, modeling and simulation and decision analysis tools and methodologies. His efforts included the development and implementation of initiatives that resulted in the rapid transition of information technologies to operational users. He also advised and evaluated Naval Science and Technology programs and served as strategy planner and program reviewer.

== Defense Advanced Research Projects Agency (DARPA) ==
After his time at NRL Schmorrow moved to a permanent position at DARPA. In that billet Schmorrow executed multiple programs. He served as a program manager in the Information Technology Office and the Information Processing Technology Office where he was focused on creating information processing technology for new generations of intelligent systems to transform US national infrastructure that would enhance global stability. He also advanced new human computer interaction technologies to enable leap-ahead human information processing capabilities. As the Department of Defense's premier research and development agency, DARPA is responsible for creating and fostering imaginative, innovative, and often high-risk research ideas yielding revolutionary technological advances in science and technology in support of the US military. His duties included the management and acquisition program oversight of $200M+ of high-risk basic and applied research and development programs in support of human-technology integration; this included conceptualizing, planning, budgeting, staffing, directing, monitoring and execution. In this role Schmorrow also published dozens of papers in refereed journals and was awarded the Defense Superior Service Medal.

Schmorrow's main focus at DARPA was the Augmented Cognition (AugCog) program. AugCog was primarily designed to create revolutionary human computer interactions. The creation of such interactions stemmed from the ability of technology to measure human information processing and a user's cognitive state. Various research projects were designed to evaluate in real time the cognitive state of a user by using either EEG or fNIR systems. Another main concept of AugCog was to design closed-loop systems to modulate information flow with respect to the user's cognitive capacity. This work earned Schmorrow the title of the biggest "cockeyed optimist" in the agency by Esquire Magazine. Esquire suggested that his AugCog program could usher in the next phase "in the evolution of the American Soldier." His work at DARPA, from their perspective, was "the future."

== Office of Naval research ==
As his time at DARPA came to a close in 2005, Schmorrow was noticed by the Chief of Naval Research (CNR), Admiral Jay Cohen. Schmorrow had been simultaneously serving at ONR as a program officer and as the director of the Warfighter Enhancement Program Office and Human Systems S&T program manager since 1999 while formally assigned at NRL and DARPA. At ONR he had been directing cognitive, neural, bio-molecular, and biomedical science and technology research, as well as guiding training and distributed simulation technology programs focused on advancing basic science and transforming promising technologies into operational capabilities and applications.

Schmorrow went to the Office of Naval Research to serve as the CNR's executive assistant (EA). He subsequently became the CNR. Upon his exit from ONR, Cdr. Schmorrow was awarded both the Legion of Merit and the Navy Top Scientists and Engineers award (becoming the first military officer to ever receive this award).

== Office of the Assistant Secretary of Defense for Research and Engineering ==
Prior to retiring from the navy, Schmorrow was within the Office of the Assistant Secretary of Defense. In this role he functioned as the acting director, and military deputy director.

Schmorrow's additional duties included serving as the program manager of the Human Social Culture Behavior Modeling program. He led this program for five years.

== Post Naval career ==
Schmorrow retired from the U.S. Navy in the summer of 2013 and subsequently took a position as chief scientist at Soar Technology, Inc.(SoarTech). SoarTech builds intelligent systems for defense, government, and commercial applications that emulated human decision making in order to enhance user abilities. Schmorrow works to advance research and technology tracks, expand cross-collaboration among internal and external team members, and identify science and technology transition opportunities. He also serves as a Potomac Institute for Policy Studies Senior Fellow, an editor of the Taylor and Francis Group's Theoretical Issues in Ergonomics Journal, and the scientific and technical advisor for the Applied Human Factors and Ergonomics Conference Series.

== Awards and decorations ==
Schmorrow's awards include:

Legion of Merit	Defense Superior Service Medal
Meritorious Service Medal (with 2 award star)
Navy Commendation Medal
Navy Achievement Medal

== Selected publications ==
- Schmidt, J., Schmorrow, D., and Hardee, M., "A Preliminary Human Factors Analysis of Naval Aviation Maintenance Related Mishaps," SAE Technical Paper 983111, 1998, doi:10.4271/983111
- Fuchs, S., Hale, K., Stanney, K., Juhnke, & Schmorrow, D. (2007). Enhancing Mitigation in Augmented Cognition. Journal of Cognitive Engineering and Decision Making. 1(3), 309–326.
- Schmorrow, D. (2011). Sociocultural behavior research and engineering in the Department of Defense context. Office of the Secretary of Defense (Research and Engineering): Washington D.C.
- Schmorrow, D., Cohn, J., & Nicholson, D. (2009). The PSI handbook of virtual environments for training and education: Developments for the military and beyond. Praeger Security International.
- Schmorrow, D. (2009). Why Virtual? Taylor and Francis: Clermont.
- Schmorrow, D., Estabrooke, I., Grootjen, M. (2009). Foundations of Augmented Cognition. Neuroergonomics and Operational Neuroscience, 5th International Conference, FAC 2009 Held as Part of HCI International 2009 San Diego, CA, US, Proceedings Springer 2009.
- Schmorrow, Dylan; McBride, Dennis (2004). "Introduction". International Journal of Human-Computer Interaction 17 (2): 127–130. doi:10.1207/s15327590ijhc1702_1 ISSN 1044-7318. Retrieved 2015-04-19.
- Stanney, Kay M.; Schmorrow, Dylan D.; Johnston, Mathew; Fuchs, Sven; Jones, David; Hale, Kelly S.; Ahmad, Ali; Young, Peter (2009). "Augmented cognition: An overview.". Reviews of human factors and ergonomics 5 (1): 195–224. doi:10.1518/155723409X448062
- Reeves, Leah M.; Schmorrow, Dylan D.; Stanney, Kay M. (2007). Schmorrow, Dylan D., ed. "Augmented Cognition and Cognitive State Assessment Technology – Near-Term, Mid-Term, and Long-Term Research Objectives". Lecture Notes in Computer Science. Springer Berlin Heidelberg. pp. 220–228. ISBN 978-3-540-73215-0.
