= Infantry Immersion Trainer =

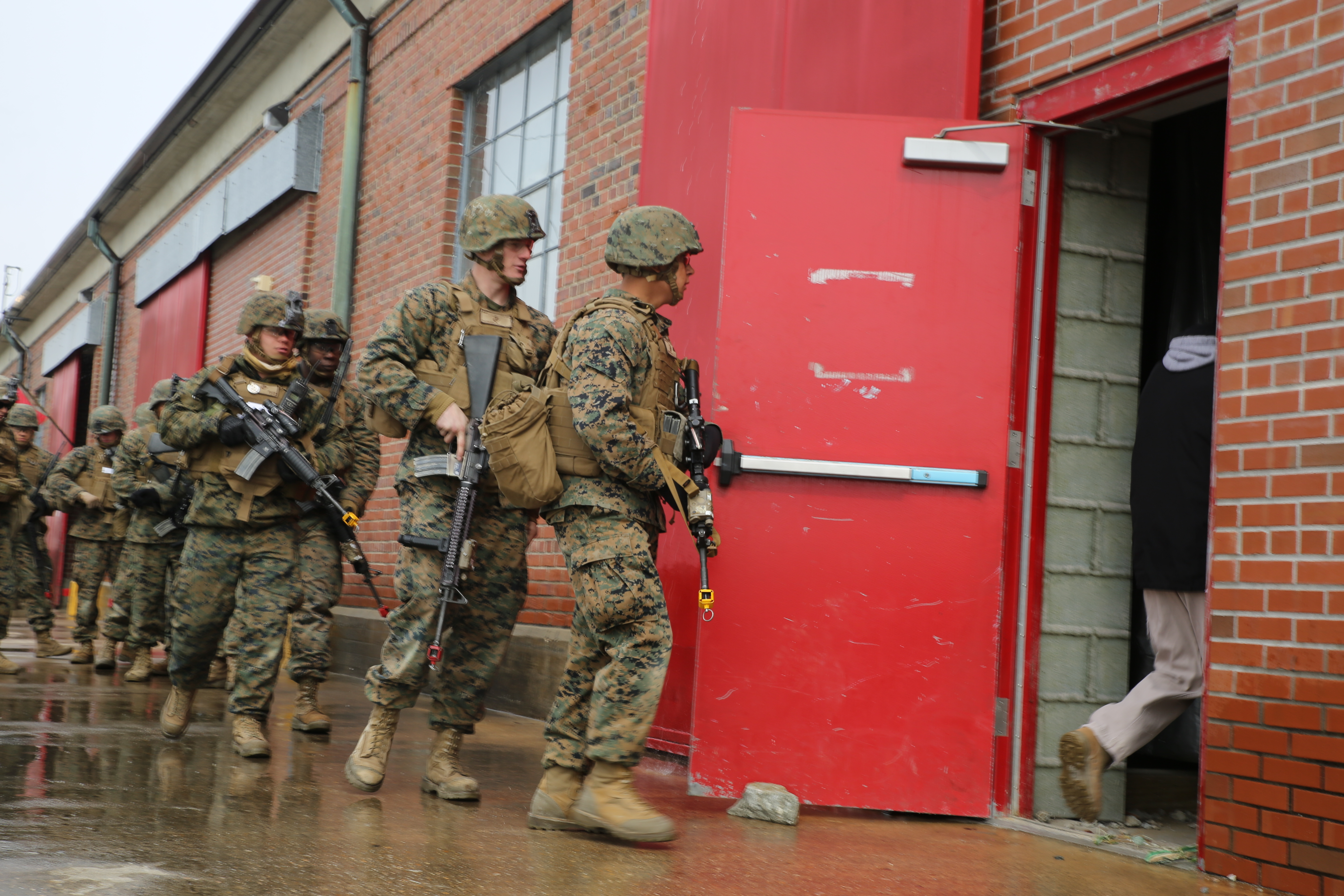
Marines with 2nd Combat Engineer Battalion enter the Infantry Immersion Trainer to begin their mock village clearing exercise aboard Camp Lejeune, N.C., Feb. 25, 2015. The Infantry Immersion Trainer is a facility that prepares Marines and sailors for deployments and improves overall mission readiness. The facility offers an authentic village experience with realistic smells, sounds and live role-players.

The Infantry Immersion Trainer (IIT) is a mixed reality training facility prototype for small unit Infantry located in a 32,000-square-foot (3,000 m^{2}) former tomato packing plant in Marine Corps Base Camp Pendleton, California. It has been in operation since November 2007. The original IIT is now known as IIT Phase I. A purpose built IIT was built adjacent to Phase I in Camp Pendleton. A second IIT was built in a historic warehouse in Camp Lejeune, NC and a third was built in MCB Hawaii.

== Description ==
The interior of an abandoned warehouse has been turned into an embattled Middle Eastern town through the use of sets, and special effects such as projections, pyrotechnics, sounds, and smells. The combination of live and virtual training is what makes this an example of immersive training.

== Purpose ==
The IIT facility is designed to be a decision house for the Marine Rifleman and the Small Unit Leader (SUL); focusing on increasing the tempo of the OODA Loop during which an individual Observes a situation, Orients to it and develops courses of action (COA), makes a Decision, and Acts. Stress inoculation is conducted at the facility where a rifleman is put into multiple situations that in turn replicate the stressors and physiological responses faced in combat, thus building the individuals stress-immune system.

During a visit to the IIT, Chairman, Joint Chiefs of Staff, Admiral Mike Mullen, said, "It's a reminder of what simulation can do. It certainly is great preparation for the marines as they prepare to go to Iraq. Very impressive, very realistic and in the end hopefully, we'll contribute significantly to a better way to execute the mission and save lives."

== History ==
The IIT facility was built by the Office of Naval Research and PMTRASYS at the request of the Commanding General, I Marine Expeditionary Force (MEF), then LtGen James Mattis, and by elements of the I MEF TEG (Training and Experimentation Group) to include the Battle Simulation Center, to serve as a way to inoculate the Marine Rifleman with the sights, sounds, and smells of the chaotic environment experienced in close quarters urban warfare.

Although it was built quickly, it was based on more than 10 years of training and simulation research.

Three trainers were built, one at Camp Pendleton, second at Camp Lejeune, and another on Hawaii. In 2015, the Hawaii location will take on a Southeast Asia setting, and the ones on the continental United States will be changed to "generic third-world" settings.

== Technology ==
Technology elements of the facility were pioneered by the Tech Solutions program at the Office of Naval Research under the leadership of CDR Dylan Schmorrow.

Special Effects Small Arms Marking System (SESAMS), computer-generated avatars, and other technologies combine with real sets and objects. It is this combination of the virtual and live worlds that allows the Marines to go through the training scenario wearing their standard combat gear.

In 2009 a second IIT-like facility was opened at the Marine Corps Systems Command Gruntworks facility in Stafford, Virginia. The Gruntworks Research for Infantry Integration Testing (GRIIT) provides a realistic environment to test infantryman's combat equipment so it can be further optimized.

The Future Immersive Training Environment (FITE) Joint Capability Technology Demonstration (JCTD) upgraded many of the technologies in IIT Phase I. In addition to avatar upgrades, there were significant upgrades to tracking and after action review. Animatronics of Afghan civilians were added to the marketplace. The FITE JCTD concluded in FY 11.

== Developers ==
- Potomac Training Corporation: Program Management and Systems Engineering.
- Naval Air Systems Command Orlando: Developed government-owned protocol allowing small weapon-mounted lasers to interact with the avatars.
- Strategic Operations: Set development and construction, pyrotechnics and other simulated elements.
- Institute for Creative Technologies at the University of Southern California: FlatWorld technology and avatars.
- Game Production Services: Designed and installed the Joint Fires and Effects Training System (JFETS) and other hardware including computers and projectors.
- Lockheed Martin, Simulation and Training Systems: Software and Systems Engineering.
- Design Interactive: Scenario Development
