= Joint Semi-Automated Forces =

Joint Semi-Automated Forces (JSAF) is a U.S. government owned and developed simulation system. It is widely used in training and experimentation. Current users include the Joint Forces Command, the Navy Warfare Development Command (NWDC), and the USMC DVTE program. JSAF was developed as part of the DARPA Synthetic Theater of War (STOW) Advanced Concept Technology Demonstration (ACTD).
