= Assault Amphibious Vehicle =

American tracked amphibious landing vehicle

AAVP7A1 RAM/RS
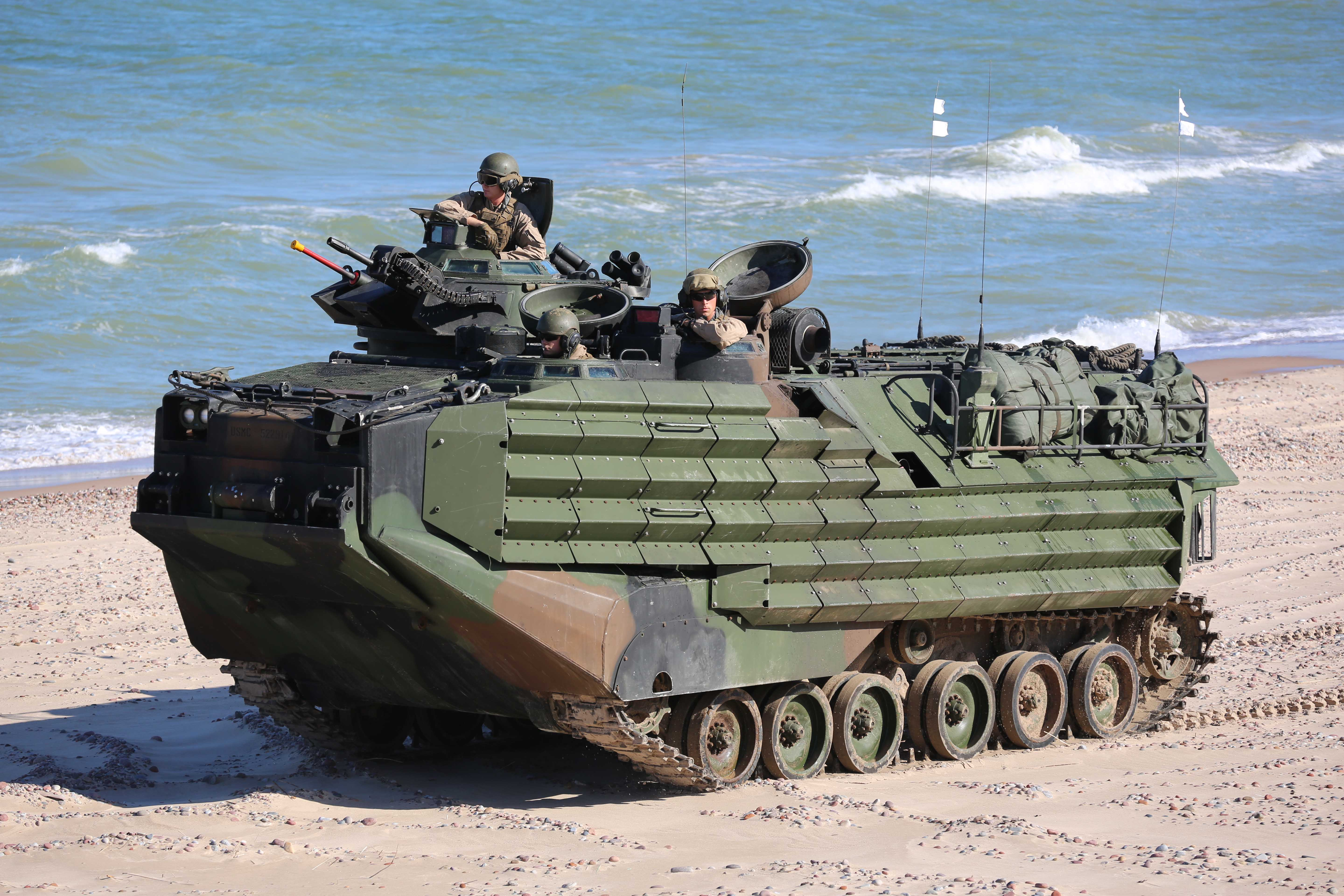
- An Assault Amphibious Vehicle of the U.S. Marines, assigned to the 1st Battalion, 23rd Infantry Convoy, conduct a simulated amphibious assault during exercise BALTOPS 2017 in Latvia.
- Type: Amphibious armored personnel carrier
- Place of origin: United States

Service history
- In service: 1972–2025 (United States Marine Corps)
- Used by: See Operators
- Wars: Falklands War; Lebanese Civil War; Invasion of Grenada; Persian Gulf War; Somali Civil War; Iraq War; 2025 Cambodia–Thailand conflict

Production history
- Designer: FMC Corporation
- Designed: 1964–1969
- Manufacturer: United Defense (until 2005); BAE Systems Platforms & Services (from 2005)
- Produced: 1972–present

Specifications
- Mass: 29.1 t (64,000 lb)
- Length: 7.94 m (26 ft 1 in)
- Width: 3.27 m (10 ft 9 in)
- Height: 3.26 m (10 ft 8 in)
- Crew: 3+21
- Armor: 45 mm (1.8 in)
- Main armament: Mk 19 40 mm automatic grenade launcher (rounds: 96 ready; 768 stowed) and 12.7 mm M2HB heavy machine gun(rounds: 200 ready; 1,000 stowed)
- Engine: Detroit Diesel 8V-53T (AAV7), 300 kW (400 hp); Cummins VTA-903T (AAV7A1), 390 kW (525 hp)
- Suspension: torsion-bar-in-tube (AAV7A1); torsion bar (AAV7A1 RAM-RS)
- Operational range: 480 km (300 miles); 20 NM in water, including survival in Sea State 5
- Maximum speed: 24–32 km/h (15–20 mph) off-road, 72 km/h (45 mph) surfaced road, 13.2 km/h (8.2 mph) water

The Assault Amphibious Vehicle (AAV)—official designation AAV7 (Assault Amphibious Vehicle, Model 7), formerly known as LVT7 (Landing Vehicle, Tracked, Model 7)—is a fully tracked amphibious landing vehicle manufactured by BAE Systems Platforms & Services (previously by United Defense, a former division of FMC Corporation).

The AAV7 was the primary amphibious troop transport of the United States Marine Corps from the 1970s until the first half of the 2020s. It was used by U.S. Marine Corps Amphibious Assault Battalions to land the surface assault elements of the landing force and their equipment in a single lift from assault shipping during amphibious operations to inland objectives and to conduct mechanized operations and related combat support in subsequent mechanized operations ashore. It is also operated by other forces. Marines call them "amtracs", a shortening of their original designation, "amphibious tractor".

In June 2018, the Marine Corps announced they had selected the BAE Systems/Iveco wheeled SuperAV for the Amphibious Combat Vehicle (ACV) program to supplement and ultimately replace the AAV. The AAV7 was eventually retired from U.S. Marine Corps service in May 2025.

== History ==
=== Development ===
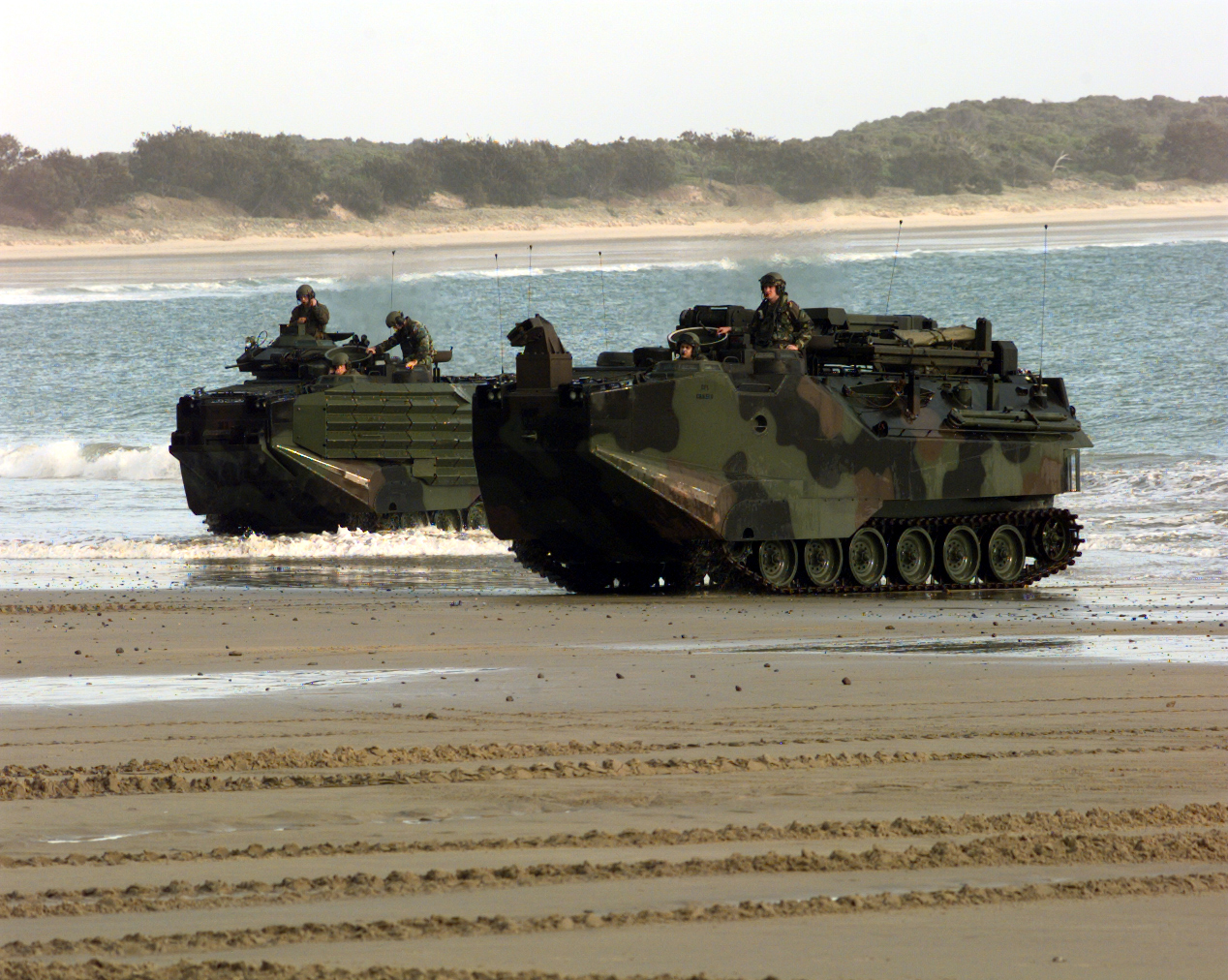
A pair of U.S. Marine Corps Assault Amphibious Vehicles emerge from the surf onto the sand of Freshwater Beach, Australia. The one on the left has an applique armor kit installed, the one on the right does not.

The U.S. Marine Corps became interested in replacing the LVTP-5 due to its limited range, slow water speed and the difficulty of maintaining the aging platform. In 1964, the Marine Corps solicited proposals to replace meet its requirement. The request was met by proposals from Chrysler and FMC, with the latter being awarded the contract in February 1966. Twelve prototypes of the new vehicle, designated LVTPX12, were delivered by FMC in summer 1967. It was also proposed in four variants, including the LVTCX2 command vehicle, LVTRX2 recovery vehicle, LVTEX3 engineering vehicle, and LVTHX5 fire-support vehicle. Of the four variants, only three were constructed: one LVTCX2 in 1969, and two LVTRX2s and two LVTEX3s in 1970.

The prototypes were powered by a Detroit Diesel 8V53T engine coupled to an FMC HS-400 transmission. The engine developed 400 gross horsepower at 2,800 rpm and could propel the vehicle at speeds of up to 40 mph on land, or up to 8.4 miles per hour in water using two water jets. All three variants had a crew of 3, while the LVTPX12 personnel carrier could carry a further 24 troops plus a troop commander. The LVTPX12, LVTCX2, and LVTEX3 were each armed with a weapon station containing a 20 mm M139 cannon and 7.62 mm M73E1 machine gun, although some of the prototypes were later re-armed with a weapon station consisting of a single .50 caliber M85 machine gun. The LVTEX3 was further equipped with three rocket-propelled line charges mounted within the rear of the vehicle and was also fitted with a dozer blade. The LVTRX2, meanwhile, was unarmed, replacing the weapon station with a cupola with vision blocks, and was equipped with a 30,000-lb winch and 6,000-lb crane. The LVTHX5 was proposed with a 105 mm howitzer in a turret but was never built.

Marine Corps testing occurred at Aberdeen Proving Ground, Yuma Proving Ground, Fort Greely, and in Panama, from 1967 through June 1970. A $10.4 million contract for low-rate initial production (LRIP) was awarded to FMC in May 1970 for 38 vehicles, which was followed in June by a $78.5 million contract for full-scale production of 942 vehicles.

Four of the five models were type-classified: The LVTPX12 became the LVTP7, the LVTCX2 became the LVTC7, the LVTRX2 became the LVTR7, and the LVTEX3 became the LVTE7, although the latter never entered production. The first production models of the LVTP7 were delivered in August 1971 and the first units became operational in March 1972. Production models were largely similar to their prototypes, with the most notable change being the .50 caliber M85 weapon station being standardized in favor of the 20 mm M139. A total of 942 or 971 LVTP7s, 84 or 85 LVTC7s, and 55 or 58 LVTR7s were constructed by FMC starting in 1971. Production of the LVT7 family of vehicles ended in April 1974.

Compared to the LVT5/6 family, the LVT7 family was far more maneuverable and faster in water in large part due to the use of water jets instead of tracks for propulsion. It also featured a rear-opening ramp, unlike the front ramp on the LVT5, and was constructed from 5083 aluminum armor, offering comparable protection to the M113. It also used a conventional torsion bar suspension instead of the Torsilastic suspension found on previous LVT models dating back to WWII.

=== Service Life Extension Program ===
The planned service life of the LVT7 family of vehicles was only 10 years. However, it was understood that a completely new vehicle would not be ready until the late 1990s or early 2000s. As such, the LVT7's Service Life Extension Program (SLEP) was initiated in 1982 to keep the vehicle in service until at least 1994. Upgraded SLEP models were given the designations LVTP7A1, LVTC7A1, and LVTR7A1, respectively.

The LVT7A1 SLEP program included:

- A new Cummins VT-400 liquid-cooled turbocharged V8 diesel engine, developing 400 hp at 2,800 rpm
- The improved FMC HS-400-3A1 transmission
- A new electrically-driven weapon station for the M85 machine gun
  - The new weapon station also featured eight M257 smoke grenade launchers
  - On the LVTC7A1, the weapon station was replaced by an unarmed cupola, as on the LVTR7/A1
- Upgraded suspension, featuring more and improved shock absorbers
- Replaced integral fuel tanks with non-integral fuel tanks, reducing the risk of damage from hull flexion
- A new instrument panel for the driver
- Added an exhaust smoke generation system
- Allowed for the tracks to be engaged while water jets were in operation, improving trim
- New communication systems for the LVTC7A1
- A night vision device for the driver
- A new ventilation system
- Improved seals and drains

The SLEP program was primarily focused on the rebuild of existing vehicles. A total of 853 LVTP7s (according to another source, all LVTP7s), 77 LVTC7s, and 54 LVTR7s were converted to A1 standard. Furthermore, from 1983 to 1985, 333 new LVT7A1s were built as part of the program (294 LVTP7A1, 29 LVTC7A1, and 10 LVTR7A1) and purchased at a unit cost of $850,000 each. New-production AAV7A1s are distinguishable by their new headlight arrangement in a rectangular recess instead of the circular design of the original.

In 1984, the LVT7 family of vehicles was redesignated to AAV7, creating the AAVP7A1, AAVC7A1, and AAVR7A1.

=== Mine-clearance systems ===
In the early 1980s, the AAVP7A1 also received mine-clearance systems which could be installed in the troop compartment or towed behind the vehicle. These matched the engineering abilities of the LVTE7, which had not entered production.

Mine-clearing line charges (MICLICs), namely the AAV-mounted Mk 154 and trailer-mounted Mk 155, were the primary mine clearance system used by the AAVP7A1. The Mk 154 contains three rocket-propelled line charges which are installed in the troop compartment of the AAVP7A1. The line charges contain 1,750 pounds of C-4 explosive and are capable of clearing a 100-meter long, 16-meter wide lane through a minefield.

MICLIC-equipped AAVP7s are found within the Mobility/Countermobility (MCM) Platoon of the Headquarters and Service (H&S) Company of an Assault Amphibian Battalion. Twelve vehicles are accompanied by 12 standard variants acting as support.

In 2013, the system was deadlined following the death of a marine during a training accident, but was returned to service in 2017 as the Mk 154 Mod 1 variant, which incorporated significant safety improvements.

==== CATFAE ====
In the late 1980s, the Catapult-Launched Fuel-Air Explosive (CATFAE) surf zone mine clearance system was also developed. Operating on a similar principle to the earlier MICLIC, the CATFAE fitted 21 fuel-air explosive rounds in the troop compartment that could be launched to destroy mines or other obstacles, particularly in shallow water. The system was capable of breaching a 20 m by 300 m area through a minefield while moving up to 6 knots (in water) or 15 mph (on land).

CATFAE entered Full Scale Engineering Development on 30 March 1989, with Initial Operating Capability scheduled for Q4 FY1995. The project was ultimately terminated before it entered service.

==== Mine plow ====
In conjunction with the acquisition of explosive mine clearance systems, mine plows were also procured for the AAV. In early 1989, Caterpillar won a $1.4 million contract to develop four prototype track-width mine plows. The plow could be controlled by a panel in the driver's compartment, with which it could be raised, lowered, and jettisoned. Developmental testing was scheduled for Q3 FY1990, operational testing in Q4, and Initial Operating Capability (IOC) in 1993. As of 1990, the acquisition objective (AO) was 168 units. However, it appears this project was also terminated before any examples entered service.

=== Product Improvement Program ===
Immediately following the SLEP, a Product Improvement Program (PIP) was initiated in 1985 in order to extend the AAV7's service life until 2004. Upgrades were done progressively from the late 1980s into the end of the 1990s by FMC.

Upgrades funded by the PIP included:

- The Up-Gunned Weapon Station (UGWS) designed by Cadillac Gage, featuring a 40 mm Mk 19 Mod 3 automatic grenade launcher alongside a .50 caliber M2 HB machine gun
  - The system retained the improved electrical drive and smoke grenade launchers first installed during the SLEP upgrade
- The P900 appliqué armor kit (AAK), ordered in 1987
- The Enhanced Appliqué Armor Kit (EAAK), produced from 1991 to 1993, provided additional protection against 14.5 mm armor-piercing munitions fired from 300 meters and overhead 155 mm airburst artillery from 30 meters
  - A bow plane to improve handling in water with EAAK equipped
- Improved radios
- A magnetic heading system
- Automatic Fire Sensing and Suppression System (AFSSS)
- Improved Transmission (I-TRANS)
- Improved suspension
- Day/Night Range Sight (DNRS)

The first type of appliqué armor developed was known as P900. In 1987, the Majestic Metal Fabrication Co. was awarded a $2.84 million contract to produce 189 P900 kits for the AAV7A1. This armor consisted of perforated armor plates attached to the hull, improving protection against small arms. It did not see widespread adoption.

The second type of appliqué armor developed became known as the Enhanced Appliqué Armor Kit. Developed by Rafael Armament Development Authority, delivery of 1,137 sets took place from 1991 to 1993. The EAAK added nearly 2 tons to the vehicle, necessitating the installation of a bow plane to maintain the vehicle's handling characteristics in water Unlike P900, EAAK saw widespread adoption and gave the AAV7 its recognizable "corrugated" appearance.

=== RAM/RS ===
The Assault Amphibious Vehicle Reliability, Availability, Maintainability/Rebuild to Standard (AAV RAM/RS) (or sometimes "Return to Standard") program was initiated in 1997 in order to even further extend the lifespan of the AAV7 family of vehicles and restore the vehicle's performance to its original specifications, offsetting the weight gains and degradations resulting from decades of use. Many of the automotive improvements in the RAM/RS program were sourced from the Bradley Fighting Vehicle, namely the engine and suspension.

The RAM/RS upgrades included:

- A new Cummins VTA-903T diesel engine developing 525 horsepower
  - Horsepower-to-ton ratio increased to original 17:1
- A new HS-525 transmission
- New "Big Foot" tracks
- Suspension and running gear from the Bradley
  - Ground clearance restored to 16 inches

The contract for the upgrades was awarded to United Defense (now part of BAE Systems) in 1997. Upgrades began in 1998, with deliveries of 680 vehicles taking place from 1999 through 2004. The program was completed in 2007 after a further 391 vehicles were modified.

=== C2 Upgrade ===
The AAVC7 C2 Upgrade focused on improving the command and control (C2) capabilities of the AAVC7A1. Communications upgrades included HF, VHF, and UHF Line-of-Sight (LOS) and UHF Satellite Communications (SATCOM). Control upgrades included six redesigned workstations, a data network for managing Marine Air-Ground Task Force (MAGTF) command and control (C2), and Blue Force Situational Awareness (BFSA) capability. Furthermore, the C2 upgrade added an auxiliary power unit (APU) to support the vehicle's C2 mission for extended periods without having to idle the engine.

The AAVC7 C2 Upgrade Program was designated as an Acquisition Category IV (T) program in Q4 FY2007, with preliminary design review being completed in Q4 FY2008 and critical design review completed in Q2 FY2009. The USMC partnered with SPAWAR Atlantic for design, development, testing, and production/deployment. Initial Operational Capability (IOC) was planned for FY2011, with 58 units procured, followed by an additional 10 in FY2012. Full Operational Capability (FOC) was scheduled for FY2013.

=== Thermal sight system ===
Demand for modern sighting systems for the AAV7 became a pressing issue as the AAVs faced combat in theaters like Iraq. Starting in 2006, contracts were awarded to L-3 Communications Cincinnati Electronics and Raytheon Network Centric Systems for the AAV Thermal Sight Systems (TSS), the M36E3-T1 thermal gunner's sight. AAV7s equipped with thermal sights began to be fielded in February 2008, with the program completed in December.

=== Survivability Upgrade Program ===
Desires to further upgrade the AAV7's survivability had existed since the mid-2000s, with a particular emphasis on the IED threat faced in Iraq and Afghanistan. Ideally, such an upgrade would provide, at minimum, the same level of protection as EAAK, but with more coverage and reduced weight.

In October 2013, a request for proposal for Assault Amphibious Vehicle Survivability Upgrade (AAV SU) was made, with a focus on force protection and platform survivability. The initial specifications called for improved armor protection on the vehicle's belly and sponsons, blast-mitigating seats, and spall liners. Additional upgrades may have included protection for the fuel tanks as well as general automotive and suspension upgrades to keep the vehicle's performance up to specification. Of the 1,063 AAV7s of all types in service by early 2014, 392 Personnel variants were slated to receive the upgrade.

In March 2015, SAIC was awarded a contract to perform the AAV SU. Marine Corps and SAIC officials unveiled the AAV SU prototype in January 2016, with survivability enhancements including replacing the angled EAAK with 49 advanced buoyant ceramic armor panels, a bonded spall liner, armor-protected external fuel tanks, an aluminum armor underbelly providing Mine Resistant Ambush Protected (MRAP)-equivalent blast protection, and blast mitigating seats as well as a more powerful engine, new suspension system, and increased reserve buoyancy. The AAV SU program was intended to upgrade 392 vehicles to keep them operational through 2035 as the ACV gradually entered service. In August 2017, the Marine Corps awarded SAIC a low-rate initial production for 21 vehicle upgrades. However, in August 2018 the Marine Corps terminated the AAV upgrade program, citing other budgetary priorities.

=== Other upgrades ===
In FY2014, AAVs began to be fitted with Emergency Egress Lighting Systems (EELS) to aid troops in exiting the vehicle during emergencies. Additional safety and reliability changes also began around this time, including upgrades to the throttle linkage, a Tow Pintle safety upgrade, Plenum Contact Indicator, Electric Bilge Pump, and new servers, laptops and radios on the AAVC7A1 variant.

In 2021, the United States Marine Corps started to install the M153 Common Remotely Operated Weapon Station (CROWS) on their AAVP7A1s. The M153 CROWS is a stabilized mount that contains a sensor suite and fire control software. It allows on-the-move target acquisition and first-burst target engagement. Capable of target engagement under day and night conditions, the CROWS sensor suite includes a daytime video camera, thermal camera and laser rangefinder. It can be fitted with the Mk-19 grenade launcher, M2 .50 Caliber Machine Gun, or M240B Medium Machine Gun.

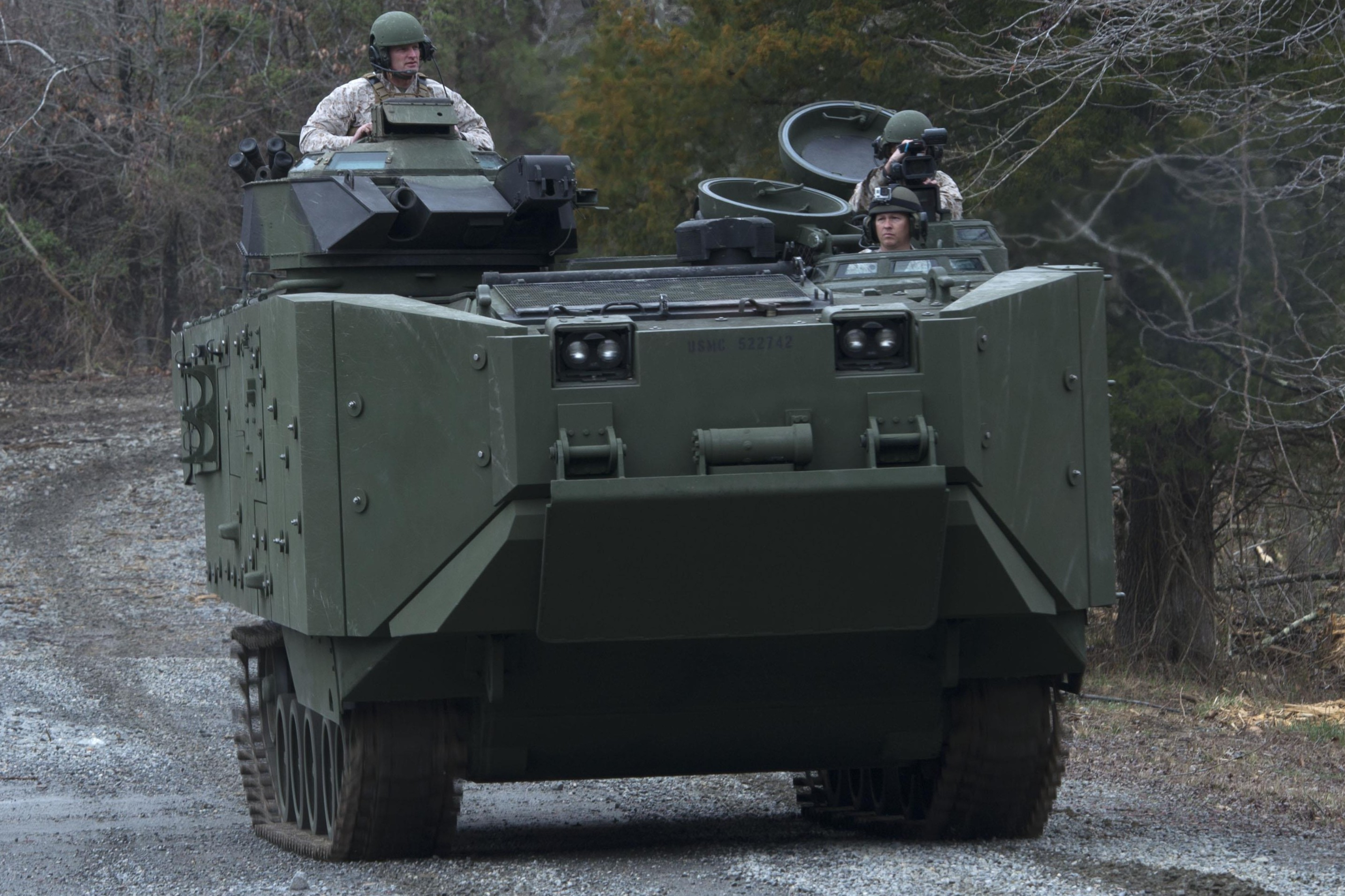
AAV Survivability Upgrade (SU)

A USMC officer in 2016 explaining the features of the since-cancelled AAV Survivability Upgrade

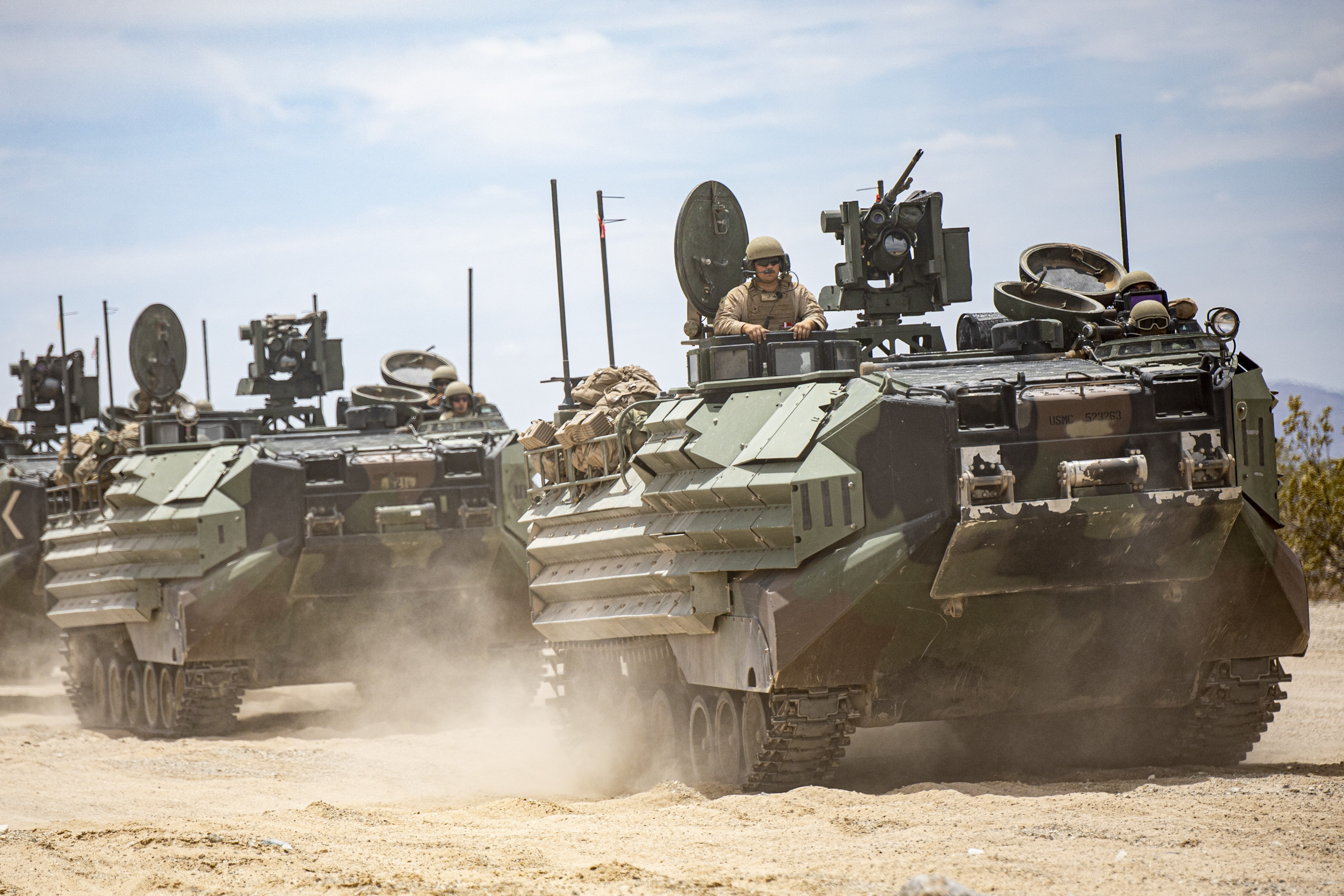
AAVP7A1 with a CROWS

== Service history ==
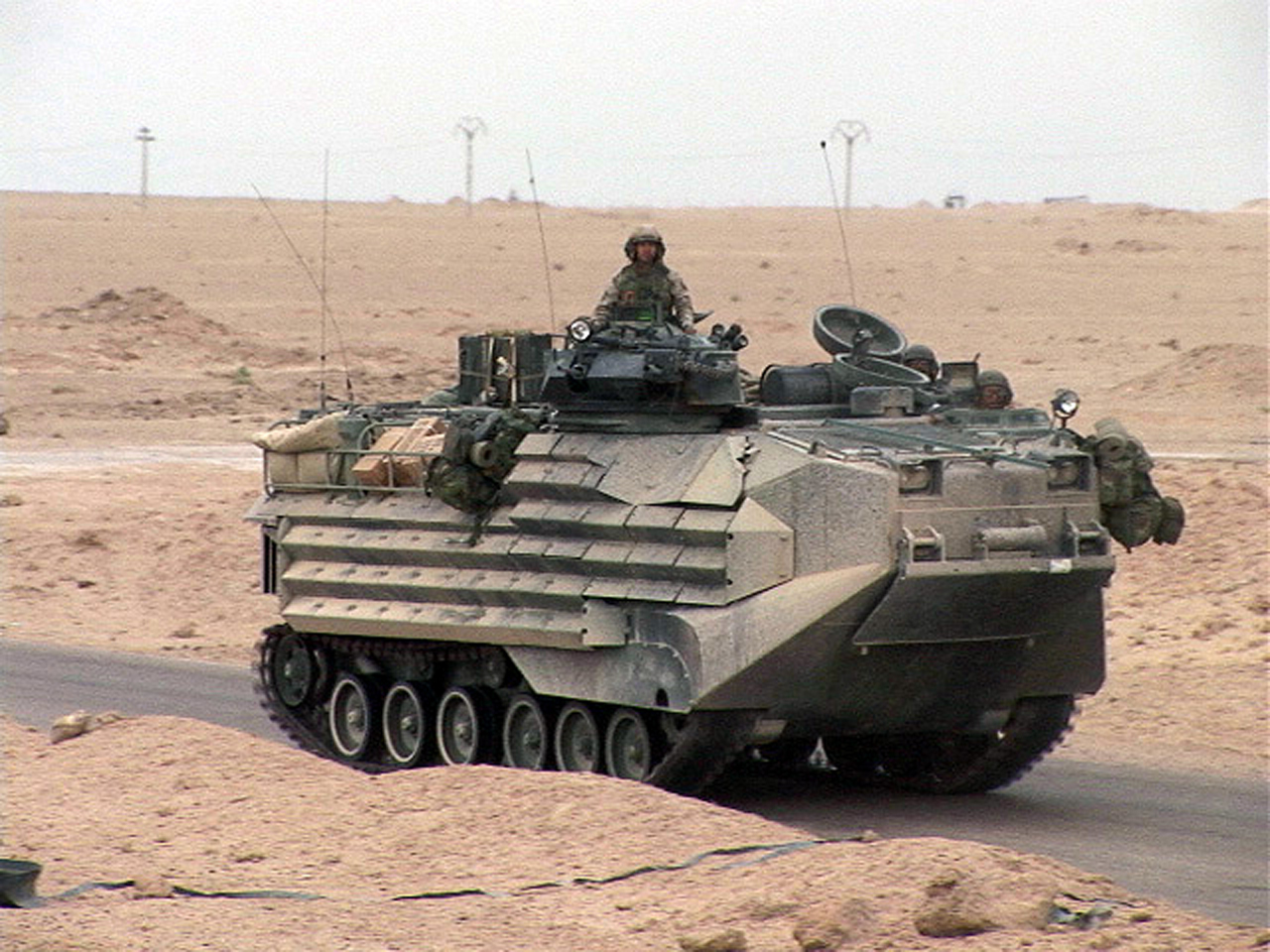
A US Marine Corps AAV during the First Battle of Fallujah, April 2004

Twenty U.S.-built LVTP7s were used by Argentina during the 1982 invasion of the Falkland Islands with most returning to the Argentine mainland before the war ended.

From 1982 to 1984, LVTP7s were deployed with U.S. Marines as part of the multi-national peacekeeping force in Beirut, Lebanon. As Marines became increasingly involved in hostilities, several vehicles sustained minor damage from shrapnel and small arms fire.

On October 25, 1983 U.S. Marine LVTP7s conducted a highly successful amphibious landing on the island of Grenada as part of Operation Urgent Fury.

It was heavily used in the 1991 Gulf War and Operation Restore Hope.

After the 2003 invasion of Iraq, AAV7A1s were criticized for providing poor protection for the crew and passengers compared with other vehicles, such as the M2 Bradley. Eight were disabled or destroyed during the Battle of Nasiriyah, where they faced RPG, mortar, tank and artillery fire. At least one vehicle was hit by fire from friendly A-10 Warthog aircraft.

On 3 August 2005, 14 U.S. Marines and their Iraqi interpreter were killed when their AAV struck a roadside bomb in the city of Haditha in the Euphrates river valley in western Iraq.

During the 2010 Rio de Janeiro security crisis, the Brazilian Naval Fusiliers used AAV7A1s in support of their operations to occupy the Complexo da Penha and Complexo do Alemão favelas, where the vehicles were used to clear barricades left by the Red Command.

Eight U.S. Marines and one U.S. Navy sailor died on 30 July 2020, when their AAV sank in the Pacific Ocean off the coast of San Clemente Island, California, during a training exercise, ahead of an upcoming deployment. As a result of the incident, on 15 December 2021 the U.S. Marine Corps announced that it has banned its fleet of amphibious armored personnel carriers from maritime operations except in emergencies.

In May 2025, the U.S. Marine Corps retired the AAV7 from active service.

== Replacement Attempts ==
=== Landing Vehicle, Assault ===
The LVT7 did not meet all the demands of the Marine Corps, particularly lacking in speed and lethality. As such, the Landing Vehicle, Assault (LVA) program was initiated provide high-speed amphibious firepower for the Marine Corps. In particular, there was a desire for over-the-horizon launches to increase the standoff distance to the shore of an Amphibious Task Force delivering an assault. This elevated mobility would be achieved through new powertrains and higher-strength, low-weight materials. In 1976, design contracts were issue to Bell Aerospace, FMC, and PACCAR for development of the LVA, and in 1977, a contract was awarded to Curtiss-Wright for development of a stratified-charge rotary engine. The requirements issued were for water speeds between 25 and 40 mph, land speeds of 40 to 55 mph, a range of 75 mi on water and 250 mi on land, maximum dimensions of 33 ft by 11 ft by 11 ft, a cargo capacity of 8,000 lbs, a troop capacity of 18 to 22 (or 25-30), and provisions for a turret armed with a 25 mm autocannon and 7.62 mm machine gun.

Initial design considerations were diverse, including inverted-vee hulls, planing hulls, and air cushions. Emphasis was placed on a tracked, flat-bottomed planing hull design, for which a full-scale hydrodynamic vehicle (FSHV) was constructed in late 1978 or early 1979. The planing hull design, however, still needed to overcome significantly greater hydrodynamic pressures and loading compared to a conventional planing hull vessel due to the size constrains and cargo capacity of the LVA, with bottom loading reaching nearly 100% greater than conventional designs. Additional trim flaps and retractable chin flaps were incorporated into the design to facilitate the transition from low to high speeds.

The FSHV was constructed with the aforementioned flat-bottomed hull, a front-mounted pilot house, and a troop capsule in the center of the vessel. It was powered by four 8V71T engines with two mounted ahead of the crew capsule and two mounted behind, with the front two angled inward and the rear two angled outward. It also incorporated a "transform" flap at the rear to improve the transition from low to high speeds.

The FSHV model underwent testing at Camp Pendleton, including evaluations of personnel performance, which gave promising results. However, the project was cancelled in 1979. This was in part due to the realization that high water speed and over-the-horizon launches (from ranges exceeding 15 to 25 miles) were simply not necessary, which, combined with the technical complexity of the project, made it no longer worth pursuing.

=== Landing Vehicle, Tracked (Experimental) ===
The Landing Vehicle, Tracked (Experimental) (LVT(X)) was developed concurrently with the LVA as a more conventional amphibious vehicle fulfilling a similar role to the LVTP7. Armament was to be at least a 25 mm autocannon plus a 7.62 mm machine gun. Initial Operating Capability (IOC) was originally planned for 1986, but, by 1983, this had been pushed back to 1997. Following the cancellation of the LVA in 1979, contracts were awarded to GDLS, FMC, and Bell Aerospace, with proposals submitted by the end of 1984.

During the 1984 Marine Corps System Acquisition Review Council Milestone I review, the validity of the LVT(X) concept was called into question, but it was allowed to move on to the Concept Demonstration and Validation phase. However, these questions still lingered, and under recommendation from the Commandant of the Marine Corps (CMC), the Secretary of the Navy (SECNAV) officially cancelled the LVT(X) in March 1985. The LVT(X) was determined to not offer a sufficiently meaningful improvement to firepower or armor to warrant the $9 billion cost of the program. Moreover, the Advanced Amphibious Assault Vehicle (AAAV) had been identified as the replacement vehicle for the AAV7, while in the meantime, the AAV7A1 PIP was approved.

=== Expeditionary Fighting Vehicle ===
Renamed from the Advanced Assault Amphibious Vehicle (AAAV) in late 2003, the Expeditionary Fighting Vehicle (EFV) was designed to replace the aging AAV. Able to transport a full Marine rifle squad to shore from an amphibious assault ship beyond the horizon with three times the speed in water and about twice the armor of the AAV, and superior firepower as well it was the Marine Corps' number one priority ground weapon system acquisition. The EFV was intended for deployment in 2015. However, in 2011, United States Defense Secretary Robert Gates cancelled the Expeditionary Fighting Vehicle.

=== Amphibious Combat Vehicle ===
In June 2018, the Marine Corps announced they had selected the BAE Systems/Iveco wheeled SuperAV for the Amphibious Combat Vehicle (ACV) program to supplement and ultimately replace the AAV.

== Variants ==
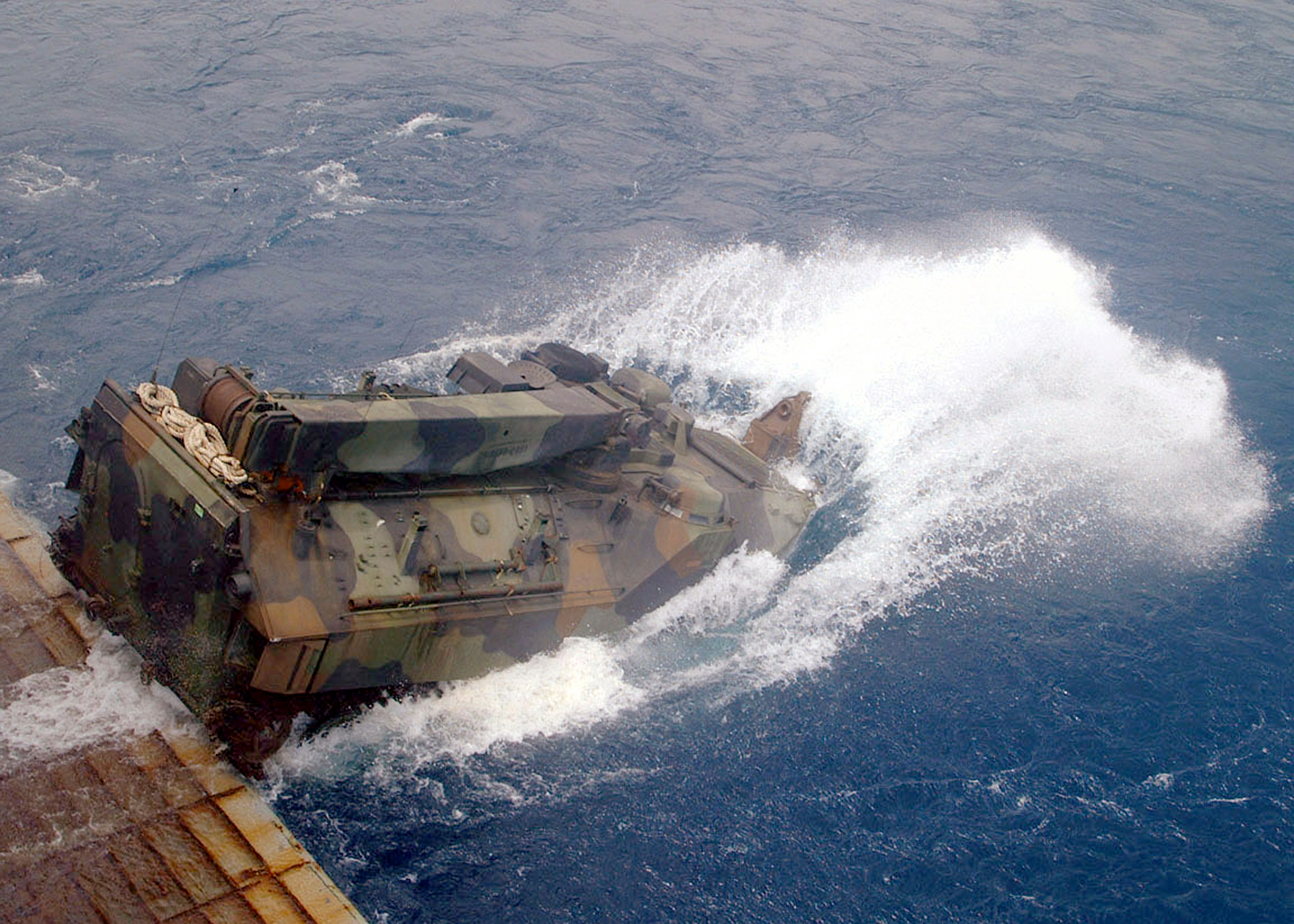
An AAVR7A1 (recovery vehicle) attached to the 31st Marine Expeditionary Unit splashes into the Pacific Ocean from the well deck of USS Juneau before heading to a beach.

- Prototypes
  - LVTPX12 (1967): Personnel carrier prototype, armed with a 20 mm M139 autocannon and 7.62 mm M73E1 machine gun. Evolved into LVTP7.
  - LVTCX2 (1969): C2 (command & control) prototype, same armament as LVTPX12. Later became LVTC7.
  - LVTRX2 (1970): Recovery prototype, unarmed, equipped with winch and crane. Type-classified LVTR7.
  - LVTEX3 (1970): Engineer variant, similar to LVTPX12 but equipped with mine-clearance line charge launchers in the troop compartment. Type-classified as LVTE7, but not serially produced. Later, an M551 Sheridan turret with a 105 mm gun was installed on a modified LVTEX3 hull.
  - LVTHX5 (Unbuilt): Fire-support variant with 105 mm howitzer turret.
- LVT7: Original production model
  - LVTP7: Personnel carrier, introduced to service in 1972. Armed with an M85 12.7 mm (.50cal) machine gun. The most common version of the LVT7.
  - LVTC7: C2 variant, also armed with an M85 machine gun.
  - LVTR7: Recovery variant, without armament and equipped with a winch and crane.
- LVT7A1 (AAV7A1) (1982): Upgraded under the LVT7 Service Life Extension Program (SLEP). The program introduced a new VT-400 engine, improved transmission, weapon drives, fuel tanks, smoke grenade launchers and smoke generation system, and night vision for the driver, among other systems. Redesignated AAV7A1 in 1984. Later, LVT7A1s were upgraded under the PIP, introducing numerous systems such as the Up-Gunned Weapon Station (UGWS) for the Personnel variant, as well as appliqué armor kits and bow planes.
  - LVTP7A1 (AAVP7A1): Initially armed with single M85 machine gun, the PIP of the 1980s introduced a new UGWS incorporating a .50 caliber M2 HB machine gun and Mk 19 40 mm automatic grenade launcher. It carries four crew radios as well as the AN/VIC-2 intercom system. It is capable of carrying 21 combat equipped Marines in addition to the crew of 4: driver, crew chief/vehicle commander, gunner, and rear crewman.
  - LVTC7A1 (AAVC7A1 ): During the SLEP upgrade, the LVTC7 had its armament removed and replaced by a simple vision cupola. Much of the cargo space of the vehicle is occupied by communications equipment. This version only has two crew radios, and in addition to the VIC-2, it also carries two VRC-92s, a VRC-89, a PRC-103 UHF radio, a MRC-83 HF radio and the MSQ internetworking system used to control the various radios. This AAV has a crew of 3, and additionally carries 5 radio operators, 3 staff members, and 2 commanding officers. Recently, the C7 has been upgraded to use Harris Falcon II class radios, specifically the PRC-117 for VHF/UHF/SATCOM, and the PRC-150 for HF.
  - LVTR7A1 (AAVR7A1): This vehicle also does not have a turret. The R7 is considered the "wrecker", as it has a crane as well as most tools and equipment needed for field repairs. It is by far the heaviest of the three, and sits considerably lower in the water. Crew of three, plus the repairmen.
- AAV7A1 (RAM/RS) (1998): From 1998 to 2007, the AAV7A1 family of vehicles was upgraded according to the Reliability Availability Maintainability/Rebuild to Standard program. This included automotive components from the Bradley Fighting Vehicle, namely the VTA-90T engine as well as the suspension and running gear.
  - AAVP7A1 (RAM/RS): AAVP7A1 upgraded to RAM/RS configuration
  - AAVC7A1 (RAM/RS): AAVC7A1 upgraded to RAM/RS configuration
  - AAVR7A1 (RAM/RS): AAVR7A1 upgraded to RAM/RS configuration

All AAVP7A1 variants can also be equipped with a Mk 154 Mine Clearance Launcher. The linear mine clearance (LMC) kits were used in the 1991 Persian Gulf War and again in Operation Iraqi Freedom in 2003.

In the 1970s, the U.S. Army used an LVTP7 as the basis for their Mobile Test Unit (MTU), a ground-based high-energy anti-aircraft laser. After several successful test firings at Redstone Army Arsenal, the laser was reportedly transferred to NASA.

=== Foreign Variants ===
- KAAV7A1: KAAV7A1 amphibious vehicle series based on AAV7A1 by Samsung Techwin (now Hanwha Defense) and BAE systems developed and manufactured in South Korea by Samsung Techwin.

== Training systems ==
The Office of Naval Research (ONR) under the Virtual Training and Environments (VIRTE) program, led by then LCDR Dylan Schmorrow, developed a prototype training system called the AAV Turret Trainer. The system consists of an actual surplus turret mounted with ISMT (Indoor Simulated Marksmanship Trainer) weapons firing on a projected screen displaying the VIRTE Virtual Environment. A total of 15 systems were produced for the USMC and one system for Taiwan.

Early pre-production prototype of the AAV TT

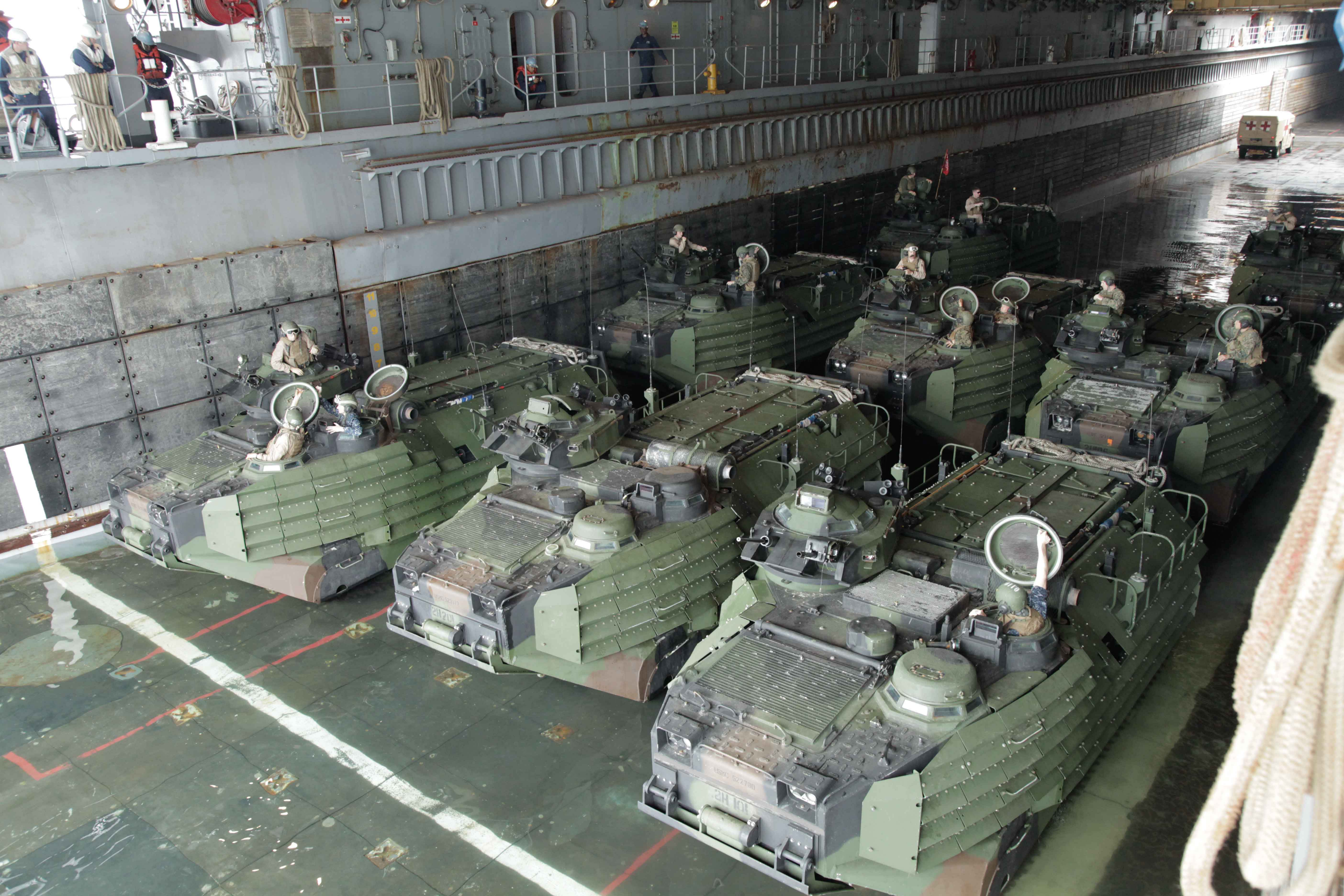
Well deck with AAVs

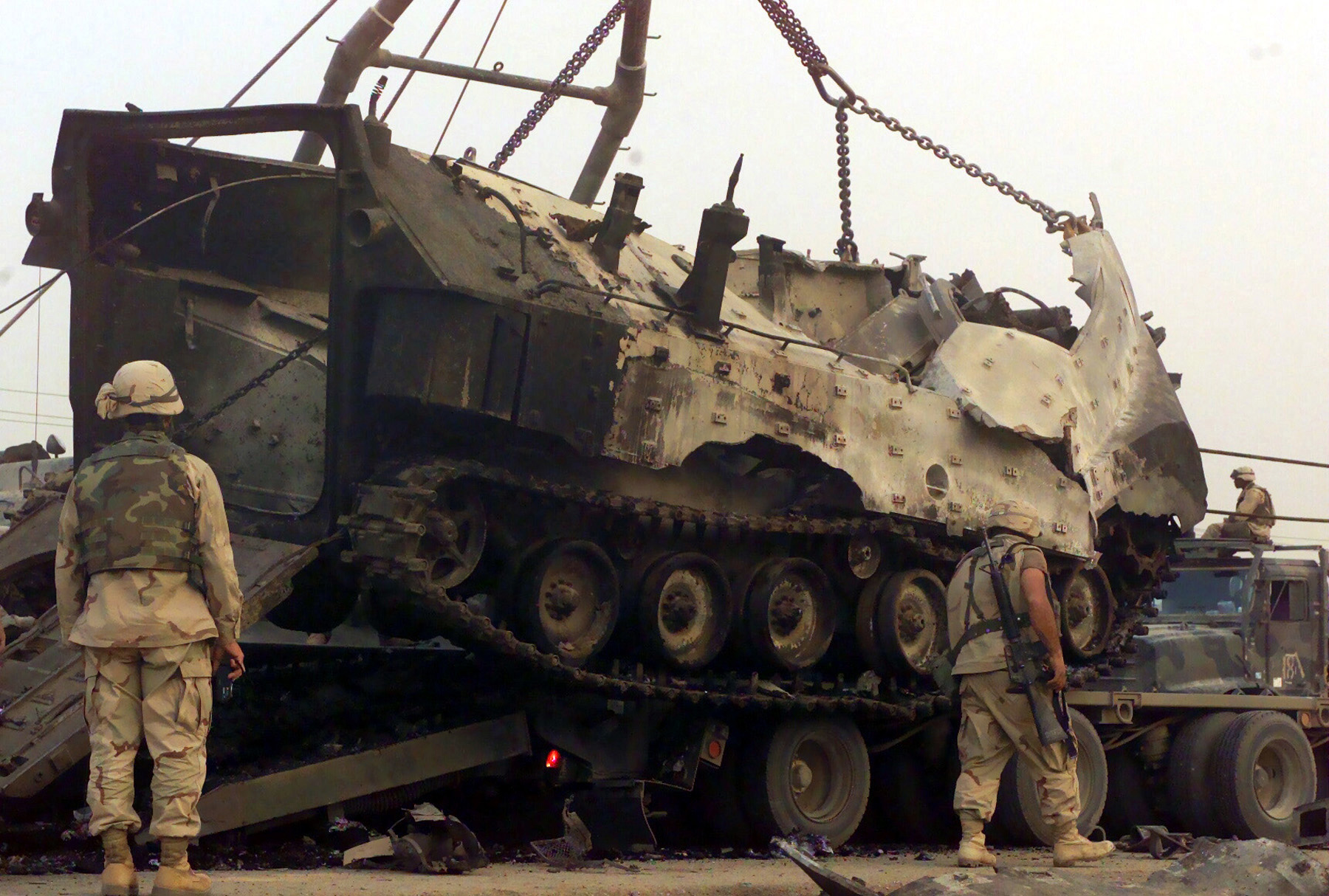
A USMC AAV destroyed near Nasiriyah in 2003

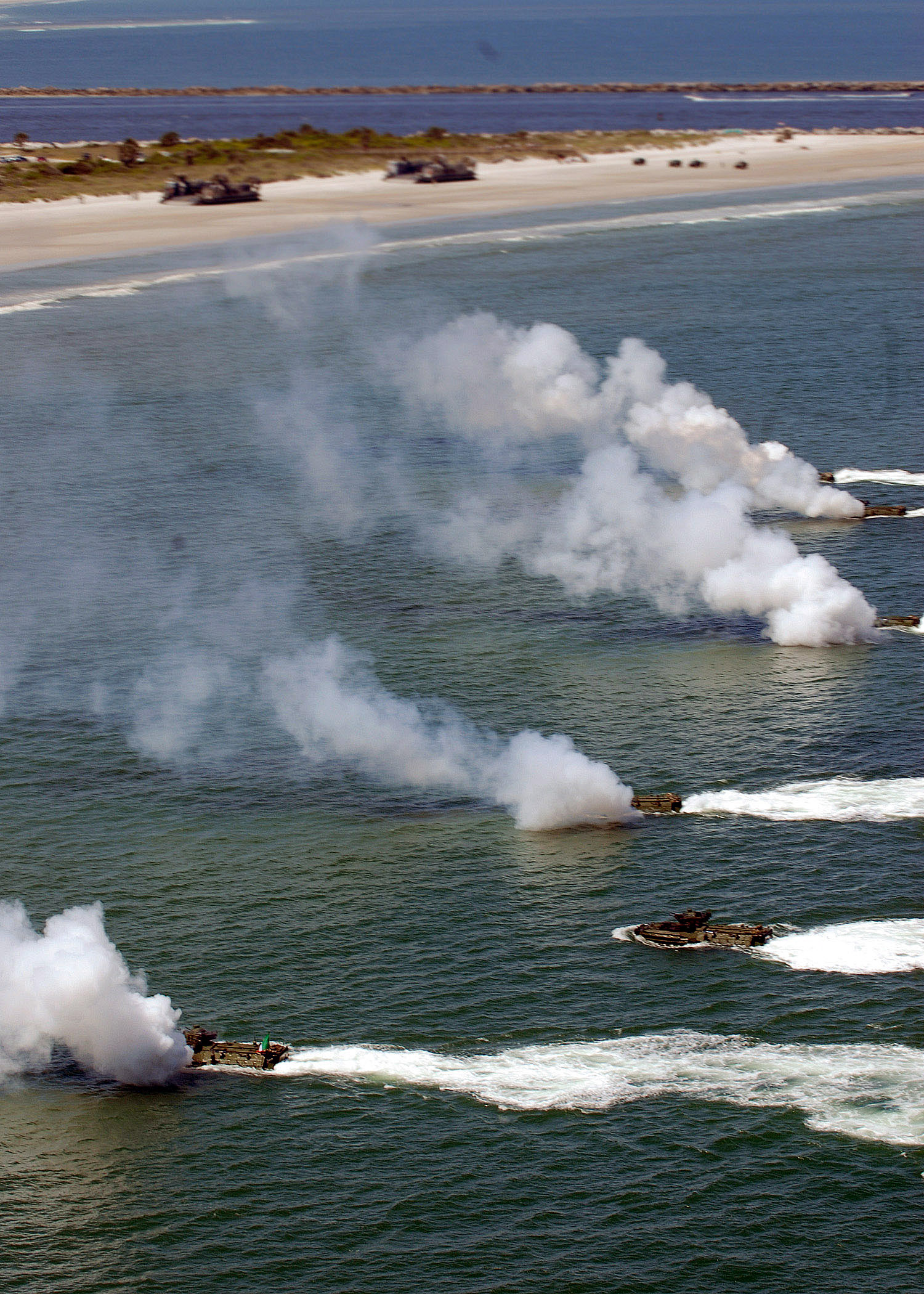
Landing force demonstration

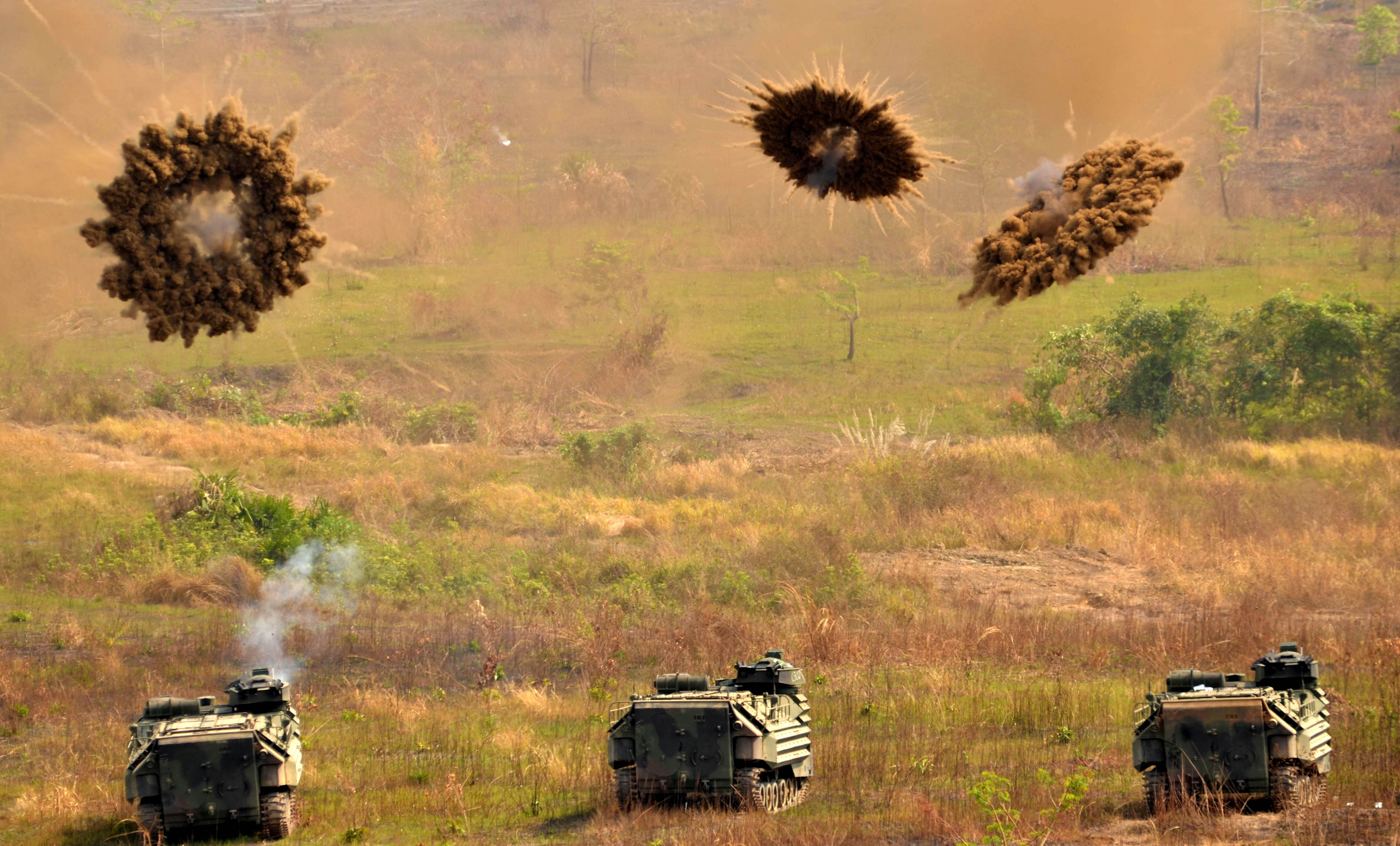
USMC AAVs firing smoke grenades during a training exercise

== Operators ==
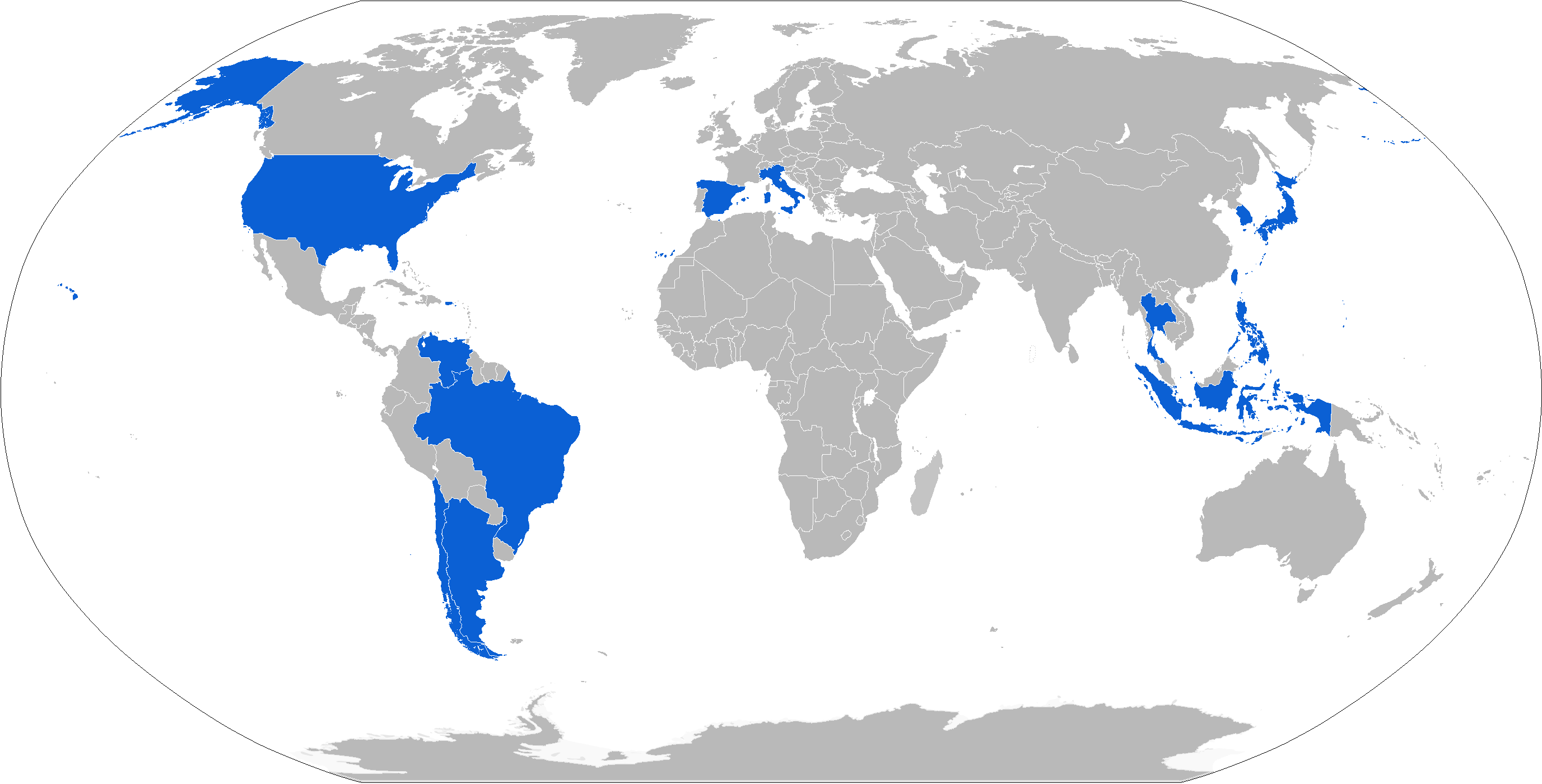
Map with AAVP7 operators in blue

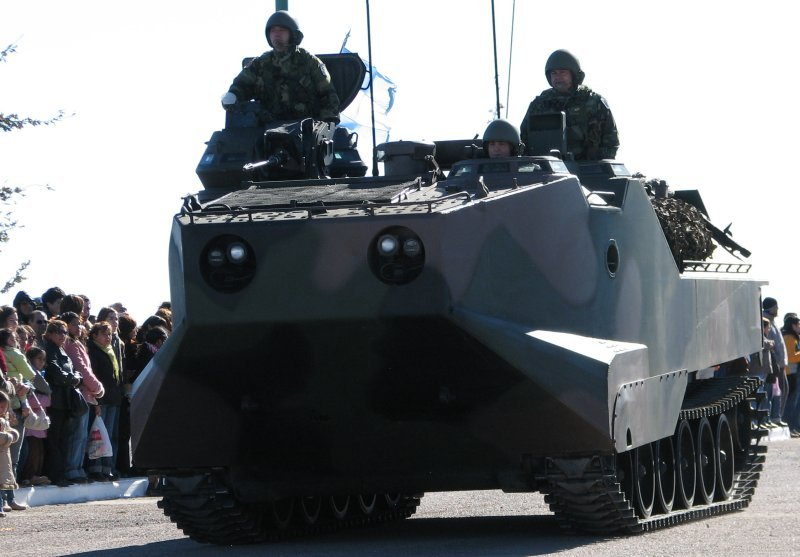
Argentine Navy LVTP7

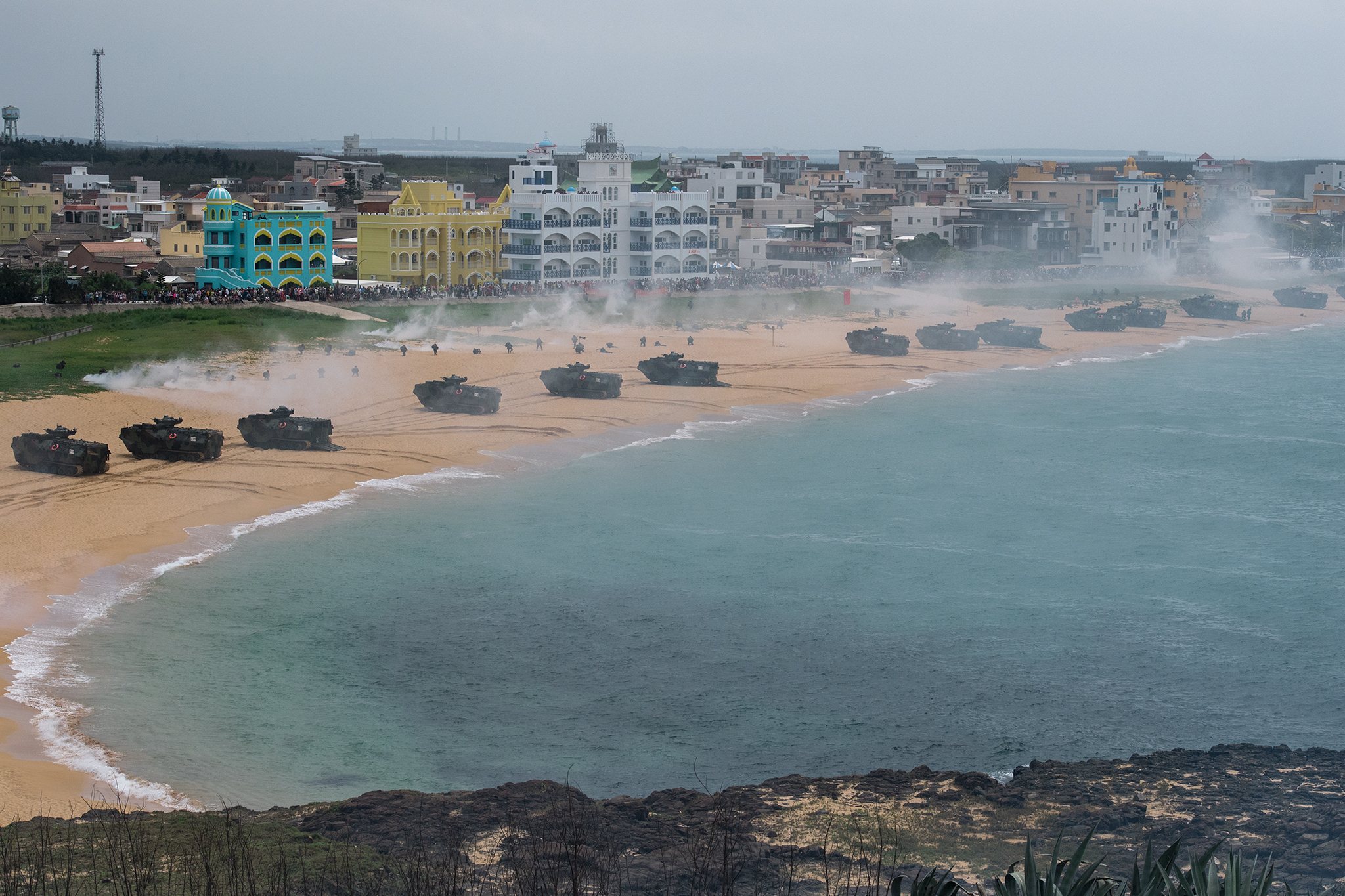
Republic of China Marine Corps AAVs during a training exercise

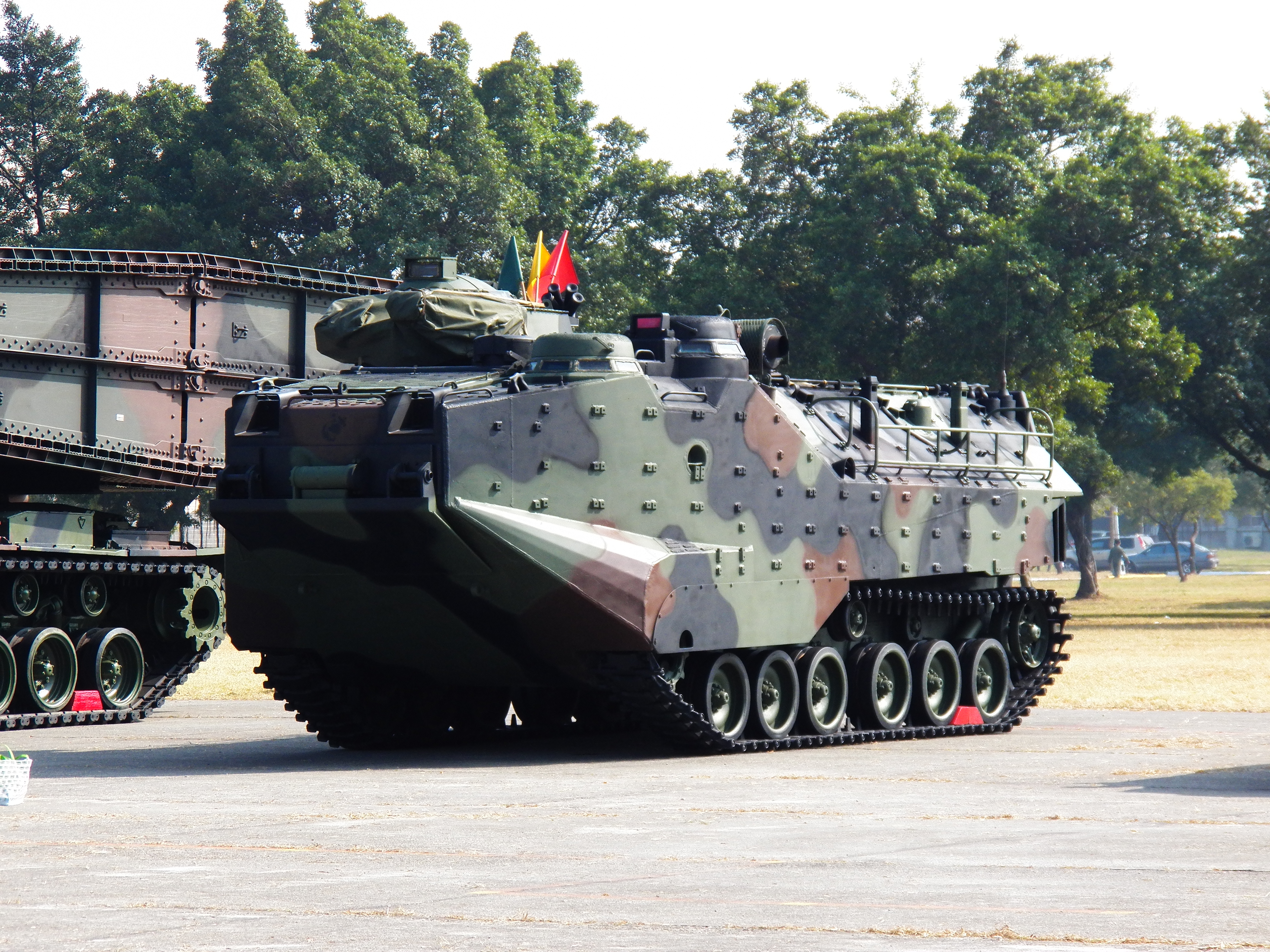
Republic of China Marine Corps AAV7

=== Current ===
- Argentina: Naval Infantry Command originally received 21 vehicles (19 LVTP7, 1 LVTC7 and 1 LVTR7), 11 of them (9 LVTP7, 1 LVTC7 and 1 LVTR7) were upgraded locally by MECATROL with Caterpillar C7 diesel engines and minor changes to running gear and other components
- Brazil: Brazilian Marine Corps has 49
- Indonesia: 15 in service with the Indonesian Marine Corps; donated by South Korea, In mid-2026 the Indonesian government approved a government-to-government (G2G) agreement with the United States to acquire approximately 35 units of ex-US Marine Corps (USMC) AAV7A1 amphibious assault vehicles. The procurement is aimed at modernizing and bolstering the amphibious lift and mechanized capabilities of the Indonesian Marine Corps (Korps Marinir - Kormar), supplementing their existing fleet of amphibious tracked vehicles. Under the terms of the agreement, the delivery of the vehicles is structured in multiple phases. The first batch, consisting of around 10 units, is scheduled to arrive in Indonesia between late September and early October 2026. The remaining units are expected to be delivered in subsequent phases to undergo inspection, refurbishment, and integration into active service.
- Italy: Due to be replaced by the Italian Marines.
- Japan: Amphibious Rapid Deployment Brigade has 58 (46 personnel, 6 command and 6 recovery) After a period of testing 6 AAVP7A1s, Japan on 7 April 2016 announced it would purchase 30 systems. Vehicles are AAV7A1 RAM/RS versions, with a more powerful engine and drive train and an upgraded suspension system, providing improved mobility, command, control and repair capabilities. Deliveries to take place in mid to late 2017.
- Philippines: Philippine Marine Corps All 8 AAV vehicles that have arrived in the Philippines are part of a PHP2.42 billion (USD46 million) contract that was signed between the Philippine government and South Korean defence firm Hanwha Techwin in April 2016.
- Romania: 307th Marine Infantry Regiment Romania purchased 65 AAV7A1 in three configurations: AAVP7A1, AAVC7A1, AAVR7A1. The vehicles are divided in two batches, one of 21 and one of 44, and will enter service with the naval infantry.
- Taiwan: Republic of China Marine Corps has 90 (78 personnel, 8 command and 4 recovery) and 1 AAV Turret Trainer.
- Spain: 19 (16 personnel, 2 command and 1 recovery)
- South Korea: Republic of Korea Marine Corps 61 as of 2011 (personnel, command and recovery).
- Thailand: 12 as of 2011.
- Venezuela: Venezuelan Marine Corps

=== Former Operators ===
- United States: United States Marine Corps retired 26 September 2025

== See also ==
- 3rd Assault Amphibian Battalion
- WWII/Korea LVT Museum
- ZAHA Marine Assault Vehicle
- M116 Husky
