= Breakout (magazine) =

Gaming magazine

Breakout was a gaming magazine first published in 1981, published by Conflict Simulations of Australia.

The final edition (Volume 12 No 2, not numbered, but effectively No 45) was published in the second quarter of 1992.

== Contents ==
Breakout was a magazine focusing on the wargaming hobby.

== Reception ==
Steve Jackson reviewed the first issue of Breakout in The Space Gamer No. 41. Jackson commented that "On the whole, it's a credible effort. The mix of materials is good for the hobby at large, and the general quality is high. The reviews are perceptive. Some of the articles are overwritten - a little more editing was called for - and the pages are gray. No illustrations - just ads, one map, and lots of small type."
