= Fire-Brigade: The Battle for Kiev - 1943 =

1988 video game

- Developer: Panther Games
- Publisher: Panther Games
- Designer: David O'Connor
- Programmers: Tony Oliver; Ben Freasier; Hugh Fisher; Steve Adam
- Platforms: MS-DOS, Mac OS, Atari ST, Amiga
- Release: Version one - 1988; Version two - 1989
- Genre: Computer wargame
- Modes: Single-player, multiplayer

Fire-Brigade: The Battle for Kiev - 1943 is a computer wargame developed and published by Panther Games in Australia in 1988. The game is set around the historical WWII Eastern Front Battle of Kiev in 1943.

Fire-Brigade was one of the first wargames to take advantage of the new graphical mouse driven interfaces on computers like the Macintosh and IBM PC compatibles. It was also one of the first wargames with network game-play for head to head multiplayer battles.

== Gameplay ==
Fire-Brigade is a turn-based strategic and tactical wargame that allows players flexibility and advanced functions. The player can play either alone against the AI or against another person in any of four scenarios networked via modem or cable. The player can play either as the Germans or the Soviet Union in any of the scenarios. At their command is a comprehensive reporting system and realistic staff support.

Players can set combat, logistics and air commitment support values to direct the allocation of supplies; reinforcements and combat support assets. Gather intelligence on enemy forces and assess information on friendly forces before issuing movement and attack orders to units in either a micro (individual units) or macro level (subordinate headquarters). You can then set the frontage of your unit's formation to either narrow, medium or broad, all while you 'confer' with the games' AI which will use artificial intelligence routines to execute the orders within set variable parameters such as morale, troop quality, fatigue etc.

Players are given a 15 step recommended sequence of play list in the game manual for Fire-Brigade.

== Reception ==
Apple Developer Award 1989 for Best Entertainment Package for Fire-Brigade

Computer Gaming World called the game "a milestone for computing wargames in terms of sophistication" and "Fire-Brigade is meant for the thinking man, the sophisticated player who wants to learn and make the absolute most out of his computer playing time". A 1991 survey by the magazine of strategy and war games gave it three and a half stars out of five, and a 1993 survey of wargames gave the game two-plus stars. The magazine gave Fire-Brigade a score of 70 out of 100 and ranked the game the "4th Top Sleeper of All Time" in its November 1996 15th anniversary issue.

Mike Siggins reviewed Fire-Brigade for Games International magazine, and gave it 5 stars out of 5, and stated that "Fire Brigade offers plenty of fascinating depth as a game system and creates something of a watershed in simulation design."

The editors of Game Player's PC Strategy Guide gave Fire-Brigade their 1989 "Best PC Military Strategy Game" award. They wrote, "Although numerous games have tried to simulate the war on the Eastern Front, none has succeeded as well as Fire Brigade".

Fire-Brigade forms part of the historical collection of software; hardware; trade and promotional materials that document the history of Apple Inc. and its contributions to the computer industry and society. This collection is housed at Museum Victoria, Melbourne.

=== Awards ===
Fire-Brigade won the 1988 Charles S. Roberts Award for Best 20th Century Computer Game
Fire-Brigade won the 1989 Apple Developers Award for Best Entertainment Package
