= Amphibious Combat Vehicle =

American/Italian wheeled design program

Amphibious Combat Vehicle (ACV)
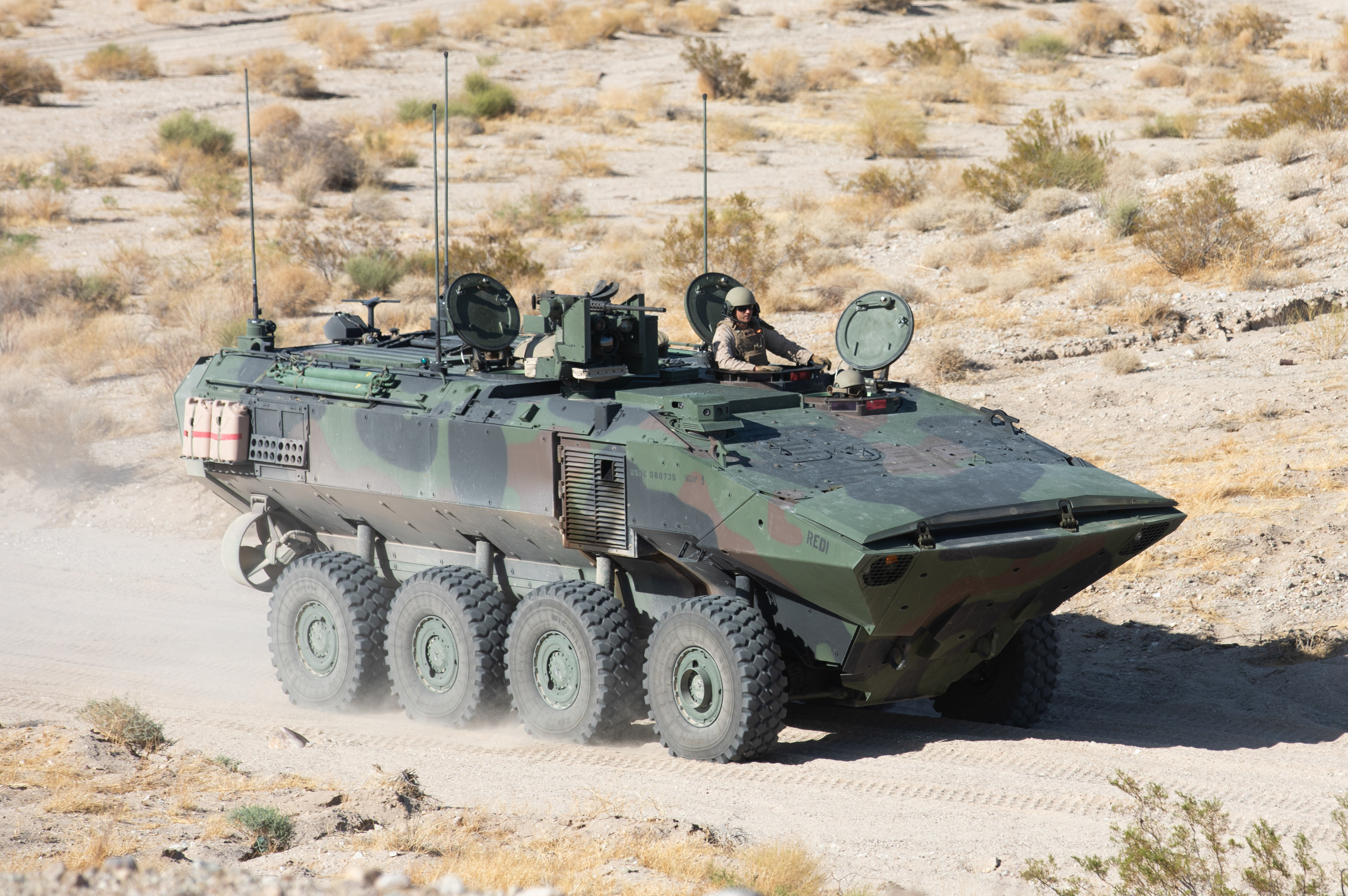
- An Amphibious Combat Vehicle assigned to the US 3rd Assault Amphibian Battalion in 2021
- Type: Amphibious assault vehicle
- Place of origin: United States, Italy

Service history
- Used by: United States Marine Corps

Production history
- Designer: Based on Iveco SuperAV
- Manufacturer: Iveco and BAE Systems
- Developed from: Iveco SuperAV
- Unit cost: ACV-P: USD $5.275 million (November 2023); ACV-C: USD $7.44 million (March 2023)
- Produced: Since 2018
- Variants: ACV-P (APC), ACV-C (C2), ACV-R (ARV), ACV-30 (IFV)

Specifications (ACV-P)
- Mass: 32 t (71,000 lb)
- Length: 361 in (9.2 m)
- Width: 124 in (3.1 m)
- Height: 114 in (2.9 m) (hull)
- Crew: 3
- Passengers: 13
- Main armament: M2 Browning or Mk 19 grenade launcher with Remote controlled weapon station (RCWS)
- Engine: Iveco Cursor 16; 700 hp (520 kW); 3,000 N⋅m (2,200 ft⋅lb)
- Power/weight: 21.56 hp/t (16.08 kW/t)
- Payload capacity: 3.3 t (7,300 lb)
- Transmission: Allison 4800SP (automatic, 7 forward, 2 reverse)
- Operational range: 325 mi (523 km) (land only); 12 nmi (14 mi) (water) + 250 mi (400 km) (land)
- Maximum speed: 65 mph (105 km/h) (paved road); 6 kn (11 km/h) (water)

The Amphibious Combat Vehicle (ACV) is a program initiated by Marine Corps Systems Command to procure an amphibious assault vehicle for the United States Marine Corps to supplement and ultimately replace the aging Assault Amphibious Vehicle (AAV). The program replaces the Expeditionary Fighting Vehicle (EFV) program canceled in 2011. Originally a plan to develop a high-water-speed vehicle, the program has expanded into a multi-phased approach to procure and develop several types of amphibious-capable vehicles to address near and long-term requirements.

The competition for the project ended in 2018 with the birth of an eight-wheel drive armored fighting vehicle, based on the Italian Iveco SuperAV. Production by BAE Systems and Iveco started in 2020 with 36 units, and 80 vehicles per year from 2021, for five years.

== Design requirements ==
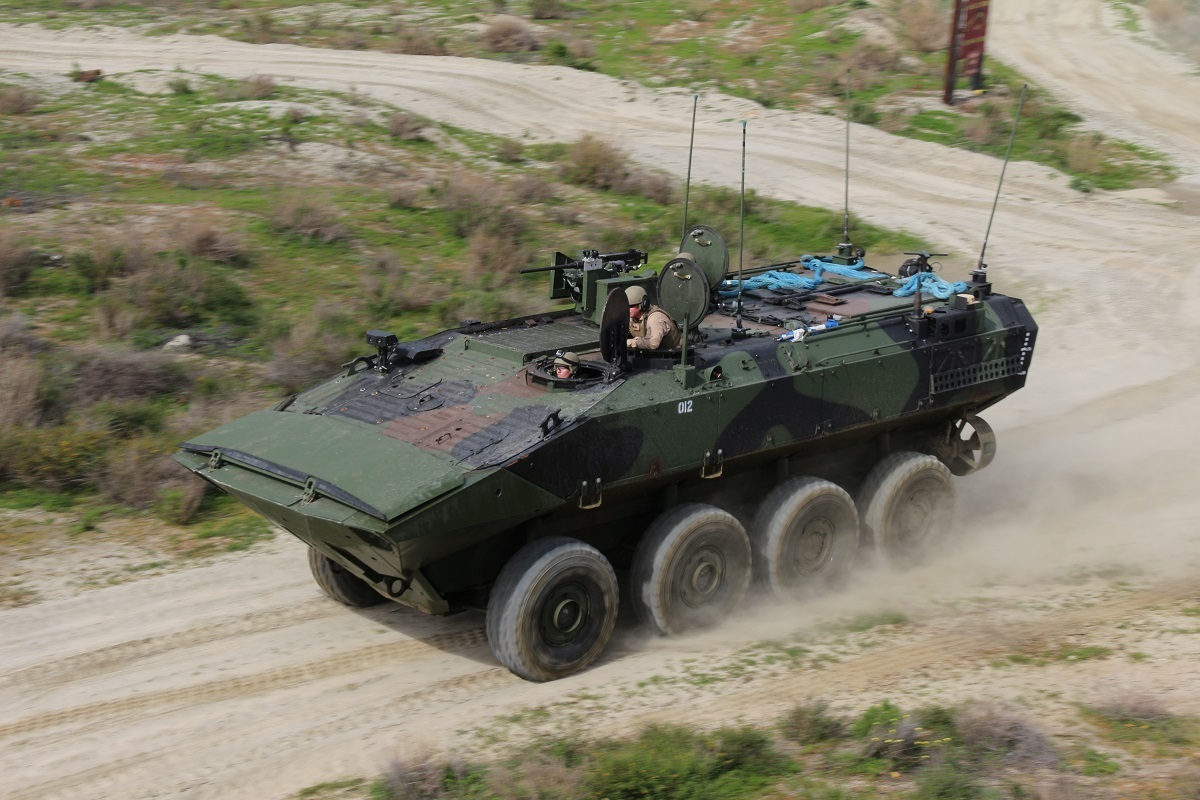
Marines from the Amphibious Combat Vehicle new equipment training team complete an operator course in the vehicle.

=== Original requirements ===
The ACV should have countermeasures able to contend with a full range of direct fire, indirect fire and land mine threats. Visible and thermal signature reduction technologies will be used. Modular protection can be applied as necessary.

The vehicle must have the capability to transition from water to ground operations without tactical pause. It must be able to maneuver with the M1A1 Abrams in a mechanized task force. It must have the capability to destroy combat vehicles similar to itself. Weapons must have sufficient range to engage targets from a standoff distance. Weapons will apply precision fire from a stabilized system. It must provide direct fire support for dismounted infantry in an attack.

The Marine Corps identified speed on water as a top requirement, even at the cost of troop carrying capacity. The ACV must be able to self-deploy from an amphibious assault ship at least 12 miles from shore with 17 Marines aboard. It has to be able to travel 8 knots or faster through seas with waves up to three feet.

Initially, the objective of the USMC was to order 1,122 vehicles. As of March 2023, the objective is to procure 632 vehicles.

=== Revised requirements ===
Given the budget environment and the technological challenges involved, the ACV program was split into two separate phases. The first phase is for immediate upgrade to existing equipment types while testing and trying out new concepts. The second phase is to develop then field a single, ultimate vehicle using new technology and the lessons learned operating the improved vehicles to replace the equipment from the first phase.

==== Phase 1 ====
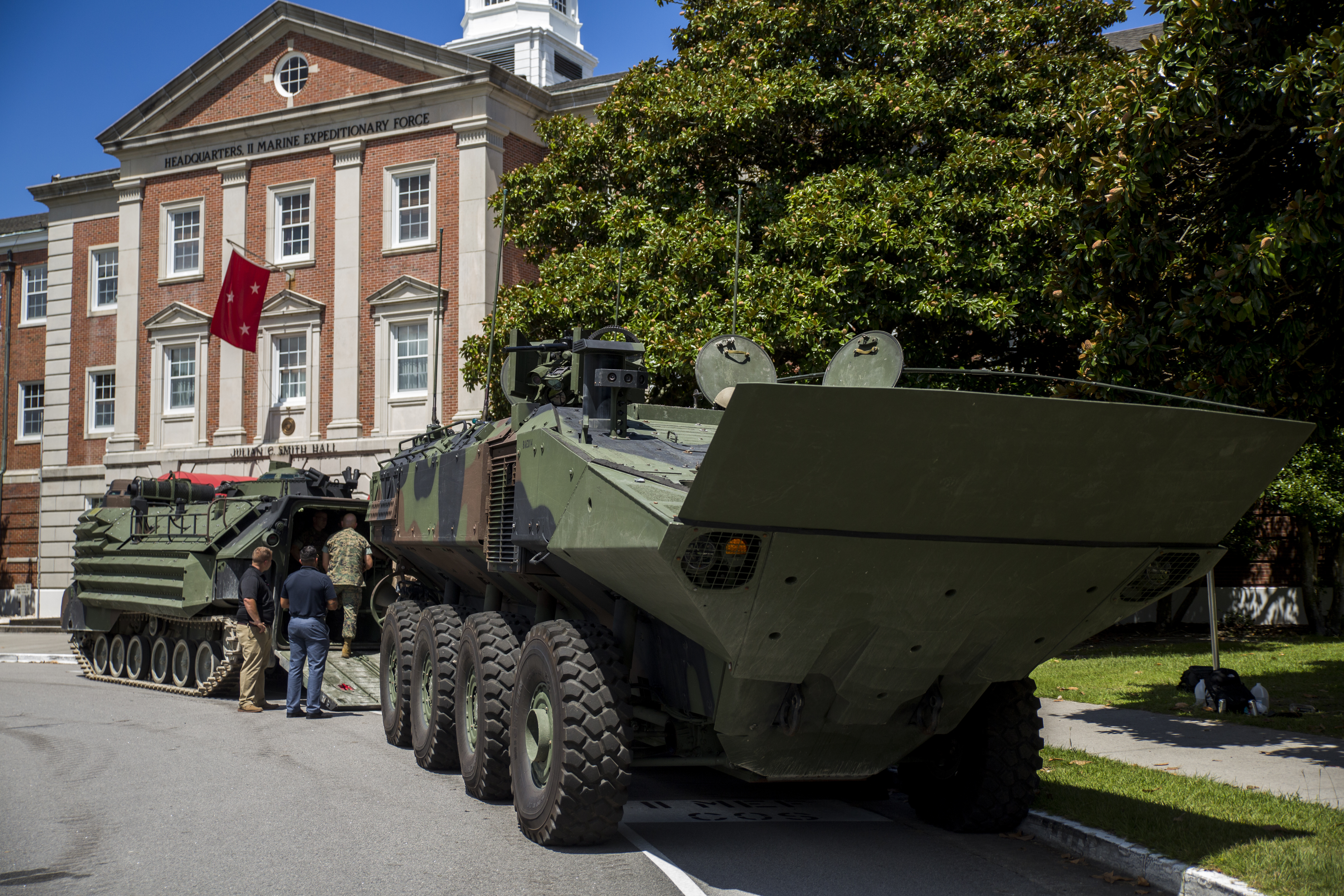
A U.S. Marine Corps Amphibious Combat Vehicle (right) and an Amphibious Assault Vehicle (left) outside the II Marine Expeditionary Force Headquarters Building at Camp Lejeune, N.C., Aug. 2018.

The first phase, will consist of several hundred, commercial off-the-shelf wheeled armored vehicles, each costing $3–$4.5 million. It will rely on connectors to get it from ship-to-shore, like the Landing Craft Air Cushion (LCAC) and Joint High Speed Vessel. Relying on connectors to bring the vehicle to a beach allows the sea base to be located 100 miles from enemy threats. The less ambitious Phase 1 ACV will be fielded in the interim, while research and development will begin to refine the features of the Phase 2 ACV.

Phase 1.1, the first increment of Phase 1 of procurement, will buy wheeled personnel carriers. Phase 1.2, the second increment of Phase 1, will include mission-role variants like command-and-control, logistics and weapons variants. These iterations may reintroduce tracks or stay wheeled. ACV 1.1 vehicles will be an operational and commercially available design that is "good enough" to operate. Its water performance will be comparable to the AAV and will have survivability attributes of a Mine-Resistant Ambush Protected (MRAP) vehicle, including high-ground clearance and a V-shaped hull, with the ability to drive with a wheel blown off. For the second lot buy (1.2), engineering and design changes will be made to meet roughly half of desired amphibious vehicle fleet size requirements.

The ACV 1.1 is to carry 10–13 Marines, have a swim capability similar to the AAV and have equal or greater mobility to the M1 Abrams tank. Although tracks are traditionally considered better for all-terrain mobility, the Marines believe wheeled vehicle technology has advanced enough to enhance survivability and mobility in a 35-ton-class platform. The Marine Personnel Carrier technology demonstrator used "in-line" drive technology that enabled all four wheels on each side to pull together much like the way a track does. This demonstrated ability when combined with a higher ground clearance and central tire inflation system, substantially closes the maneuverability gap for wheeled vehicles and results in equal or better maneuverability than the M1A1 and better performance over the AAV, both of which are tracked.

ACV firing its M2 .50-caliber machine gun Remote Weapon Station (RWS)

Improved technology used to inform requirements to build ACV 1.2 vehicles will later be applied to delivered 1.1 versions to upgrade them to 1.2 standard. Each ACV 1.1 vehicle will have a 3-man crew and two vehicles will carry a reinforced rifle squad. Armament will consist of an M2 .50-caliber machine gun in a remote weapons station, with the potential to install a stabilized dual-mount M2/Mark 19 grenade launcher turret. Potential water speeds are for a 12 nmi (14 mi; 22 km) ship-to-shore capability, at 8 kn (15 km/h).

==== Phase 2 ====
The second phase is the original high-water-speed effort to develop a vehicle capable of self-deployment from ships, and travel at speeds of 13–15 kn (24–28 km/h) on water, each costing $12–$14 million. This last phase of ACV procurement would be purchasing a high-water-speed vehicle, but only if technologies make it achievable without sacrificing armor and weapons.

== History ==
=== Request for Information ===
A Request For Information (RFI) was issued to industry in February 2011. The document outlined expected requirements and asked industry for informal design proposals and program methodology feedback. Responses were due by 22 April 2011. An industry day was held on 6 April 2011.

In August 2012, General Dynamics was awarded an ACV Hull Survivability Demonstrator contract for the design, fabrication and test support of a full-scale hull to demonstrate crew-protection technologies. In November 2012, they conducted simulated mine-blast tests on their ACV ballistic hull design, successfully meeting mine-blast survivability requirements. Work concluded by May 2013 and will be used to refine requirements for effective protection against under-vehicle threats.

In April 2013, Defense Advanced Research Projects Agency (DARPA) awarded a $1 million prize to a team in the Fast Adaptable Next-Generation Ground Vehicle (FANG) contest. The team beat out 1,000 other competitors to submit their design for a drivetrain for the ACV. The FANG initiative was to demonstrate a way to procure working systems better than the current defense acquisition process, which frequently leads to delays and cost overruns. The Marines are in charge of the ACV program, so there was no guarantee that the DARPA-crowdsourced mobility drivetrain would result in a vehicle bought by the Corps.

At a roundtable discussion in June 2013, Marine Corps General Jim Amos told the media that the program was still being pursued and that a Request For Proposals (RFP) would be issued in early 2014. The Corps has secured and saved a "moderate amount" of money for early development. With the previous EFV cancelled from cost overruns, the Marines are being cautious to identify trade-offs between requirements and cost for the platform. Amos noted that they were working with contractors to see which type of vehicle would meet requirements without proving too costly.

In January 2013, the ACV team was created and tasked to evaluate the feasibility of building an affordable, survivable amphibious high water speed vehicle. The team includes representatives from over six Department of Defense commands. Their initial requirements and engineering analysis evaluated 198 requirements for the platform.

From July 9–11, 2013, 25 Marines gathered at Marine Corps Base Quantico, Virginia for a Warfighter Requirements Workshop to review the team's capabilities analysis and determine the value of various capabilities. 30 requirements with cost and weight implications were considered "tradable," including armament and armor protection. Safety and design-specific capabilities, like fitting on an amphibious ship, were considered non-tradable. The point of the workshop was to get input from fleet Marines about what capabilities they wanted to prioritize with current financial pressures. Over the next month, the team ordered the preferences and applied actual cost and weight data to determine feasibility recommendations for Marine Corps leaders by the fall.

=== Single vehicle ===
In March 2015, the Marines revealed that the separate ACV 1.1 and 1.2 increments may be merged into a single vehicle. Given that the winner of phase 1.1 will likely be awarded the 1.2 contract, industry is already planning to make their submissions meet the later requirements early. The main differences between the phases is the 1.2's greater self-deploying capability and more seating capacity. Merging the two phases to meet higher requirements earlier could speed up the acquisition timeline and drive down price, since the quantities for both would be bought in bulk. The Marines released the final RFP for ACV 1.1 in March 2015.

In July 2015, Lockheed Martin revealed it had ended its association with Finnish company Patria on their previous collaborative Havoc offering for the program. Lockheed unveiled their new ACV offering in September 2015.

In October 2017 deputy Marine commandant Lt. Gen. Brian Beaudreault stated "We have to find a solution to getting Marines to shore, from over the horizon, at something greater than seven knots (8 mph)," the swimming speed of the existing Amphibious Assault Vehicle (AAV) and its Amphibious Combat Vehicle (ACV) replacement. Continuing, he said "we must find a high-water-speed vehicle on the surface. We must."

The Deputy Commandant's statements seemly contradict the phased approach to having a non-self deploying vehicle in the ACV 1.1 and then a fully amphibious vehicle in ACV 1.2. The question remains if the Marines are still interested in procuring a high speed connector vehicle after merging ACV 1.1 and 1.2.

In May 2018 a former Marine officer, Jeff Groom, published an article concerning the ACV. Both BAE System's and SAIC's ACV 1.1 test vehicles could self-deploy and swim from a ship, in contradiction to General Dunford's testimony in March 2015. However, there is apparently no longer a need for speed on water as both test vehicles move through the water at 7 knots using traditional water propellers, the same speed as the legacy 1970s AAV. The article questioned the acquisition decision of a vehicle that swims at the same speed as the vehicle it replaces, carries fewer troops and is more expensive.

=== Engineering and Manufacturing Development (EMD) phase ===
On 24 November 2015, the Marines selected the BAE Systems and Iveco with Iveco SuperAV vehicle and the SAIC Terrex vehicle to move on to the Engineering and Manufacturing Development (EMD) phase of the ACV 1.1 program, beating out the vehicles from Lockheed Martin, General Dynamics and Advanced Defense Vehicle Systems. The Marine Corps valued swim operations, land operations, carrying capability and force protection equally in the selection process, but the two winners were chosen for emphasis focused on amphibious swim capability since the ACV is "fundamentally an amphibious vehicle". Each company was awarded a contract to build 16 vehicles by late 2016, 13 initially and three more when funding becomes available, with testing beginning in early 2017 and lasting one year. A winner is planned to be selected in 2018 to build 204 vehicles, with the first entering service in 2020 and all delivered by 2023.

=== Selection and contract ===
ACV demonstration at Amphibious Vehicle Test Branch facility, Marine Corps Base Camp Pendleton, ca. 2019 (2:13)

ACV open ocean testing with Marine Corps operators off the coast of Marine Corps Base Camp Pendleton, ca. 2020 (1:23)

In June 2018, the BAE design was selected, with an initial order of 30 ACVs. In June 2019, BAE Systems and Iveco were awarded a contract to develop Command and 30mm gun armed variants.

In October 2020, Iveco announced that the first fleet of 18 ACVs had been delivered to a platoon of Marines after five years of testing development.

In December 2020, the Marine Corps and BAE Systems announced the commencement of full-rate production, with an initial batch of 36, expected to grow to 72 in early 2021, with an option for 80 vehicles per year thereafter. The subcontract for the ACV's remote turret went to Kongsberg Defence Systems with the Protector RT20.

A January 2021 report from the Department of Defense's Director of Operational Test & Evaluation (DOT&E) pointed to several problems with the ACV, including cramped quarters, difficult egress and frequent breakdown.

In August 2022, the U.S. Marine Corps awarded BAE Systems an $88 million contract to build multiple ACV-30 Production Representative Test Vehicles (PRTVs).

== Variants ==
The ACV Family of Vehicles is made of what was initially, the ACV 1.1 and ACV 1.2.

- ACV 1.1: it was designed with the requirement for a swim capability of at least 3 nautical miles from its ship to the shore.
- ACV 1.2: The requirement for its capability is set to be increased to 12 miles from the ship to the shore, and additional improvements are expected to be made. Communication and recovery variants are also expected.

Both generations were merged to make a common basis for various variants in January 2019.

=== Variants in production and in service ===
==== ACV-C ====
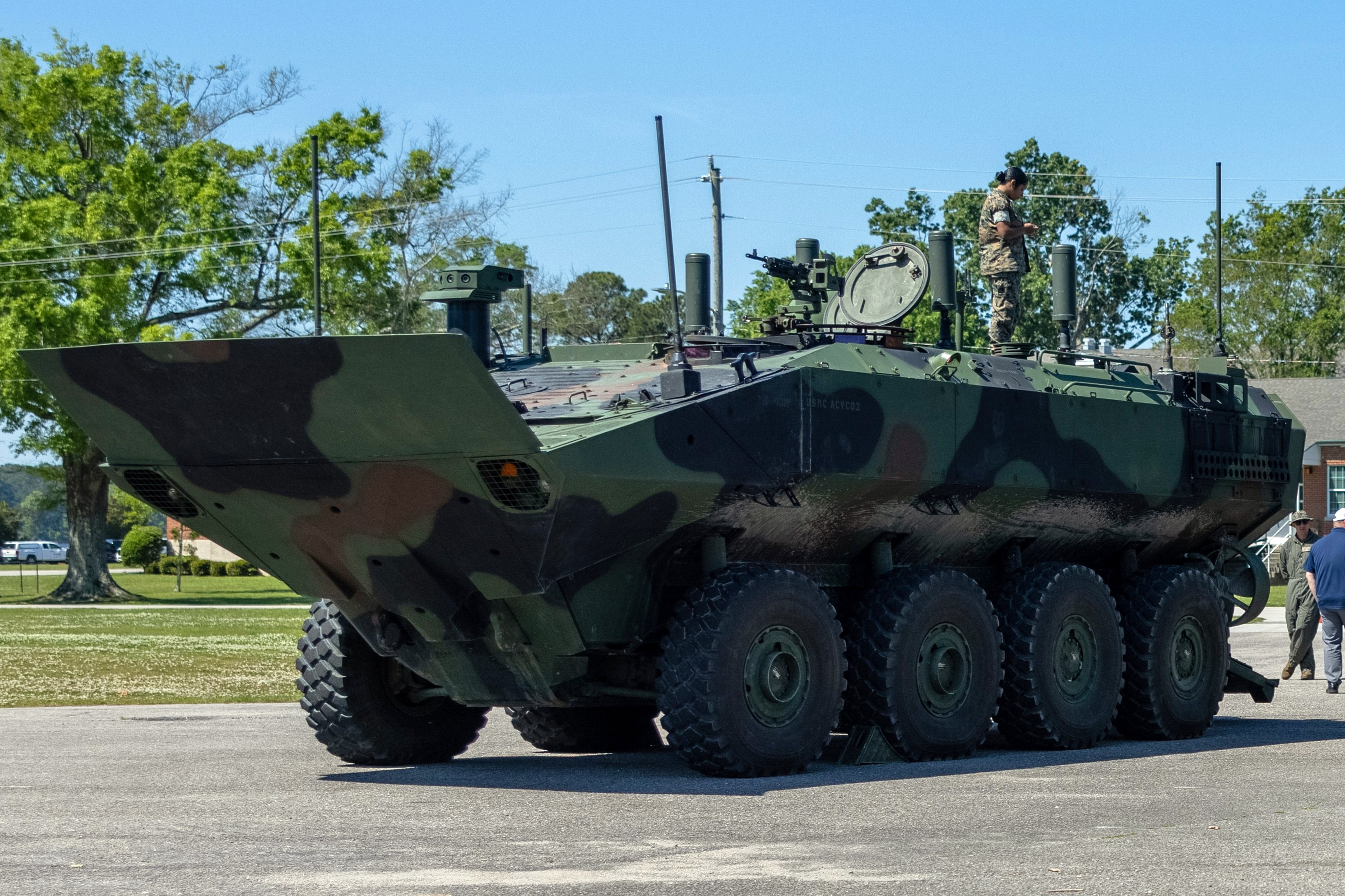
ACV-C

The Amphibious Combat Vehicle – Command and Control (ACV-C) is a variant of the ACV designed to serve as a mobile command post. It shares the same hull, powertrain, drivetrain, and survivability suite as the ACV-P (Personnel variant) but is equipped with seven radios, additional antennas, and an expanded battery pack to support silent watch operations. The vehicle enables secure voice and data communications, supports operational planning, intelligence processing, fire support coordination, and logistics management.

The first production vehicle of this variant was delivered in January 2024. It has an AAO (approved acquisition objective) of 33 vehicles.

==== ACV-P ====
The ACV-P is the personnel carrier variant of the ACV. It carries a crew of three and can transport a squad of thirteen Marines, along with two days' worth of combat equipment and supplies. The ACV-P is equipped with the M153 Protector Remote Weapon Station (RWS), which can be fitted with either the M2 .50 Caliber machine gun, ready to fire with 400 rounds, or a Mk-19 grenade launcher, ready to fire with 96 rounds. The M153 is a stabilized mount that contains a sensor suite and fire control software. It allows on-the-move target acquisition and first-burst target engagement. Capable of target engagement under day and night conditions, the M153's sensor suite includes a daytime video camera, thermal camera and laser rangefinder. The ACV-P has an AAO (approved acquisition objective) of 390 vehicles, it reached its IOC in 2020.

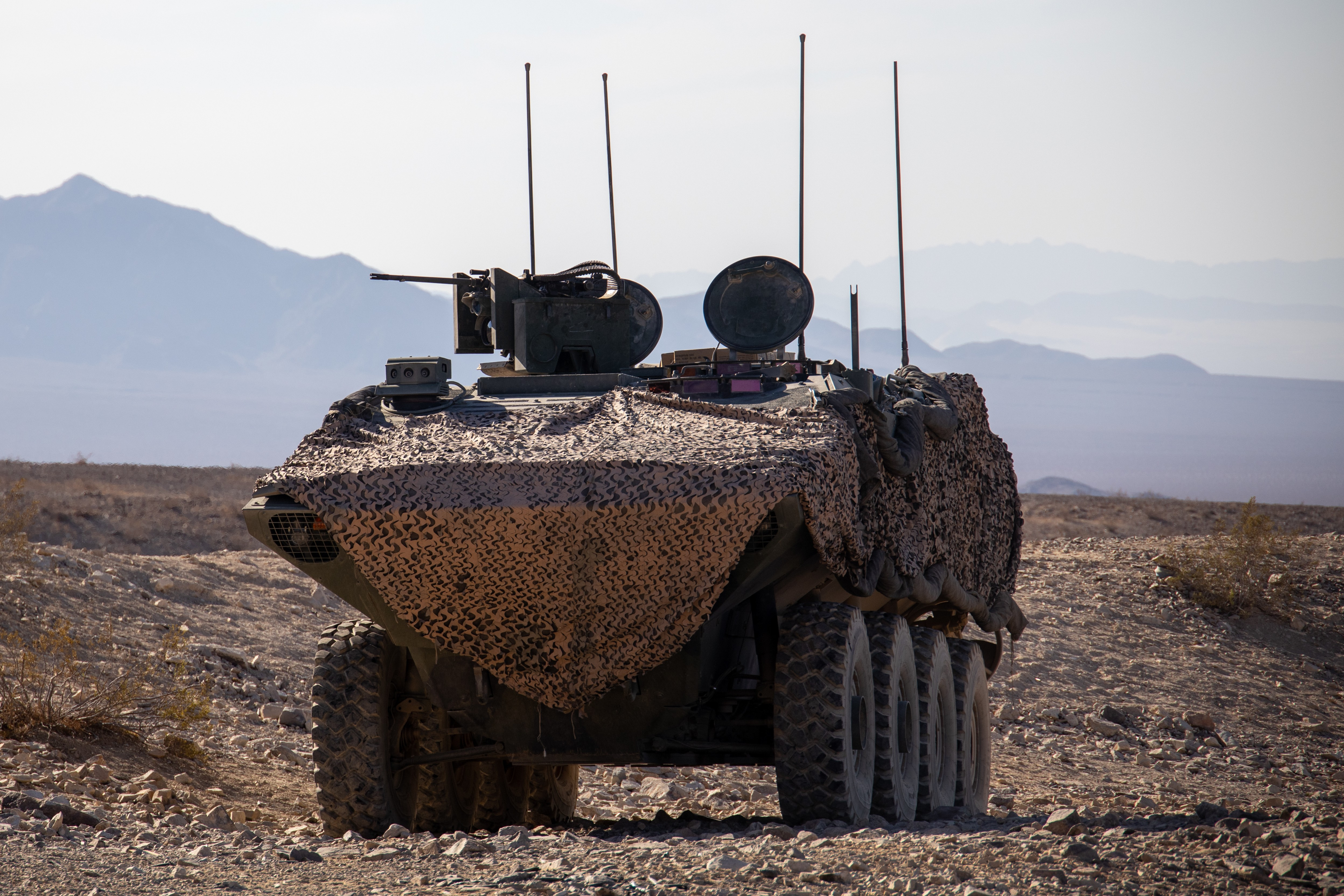
ACV-P

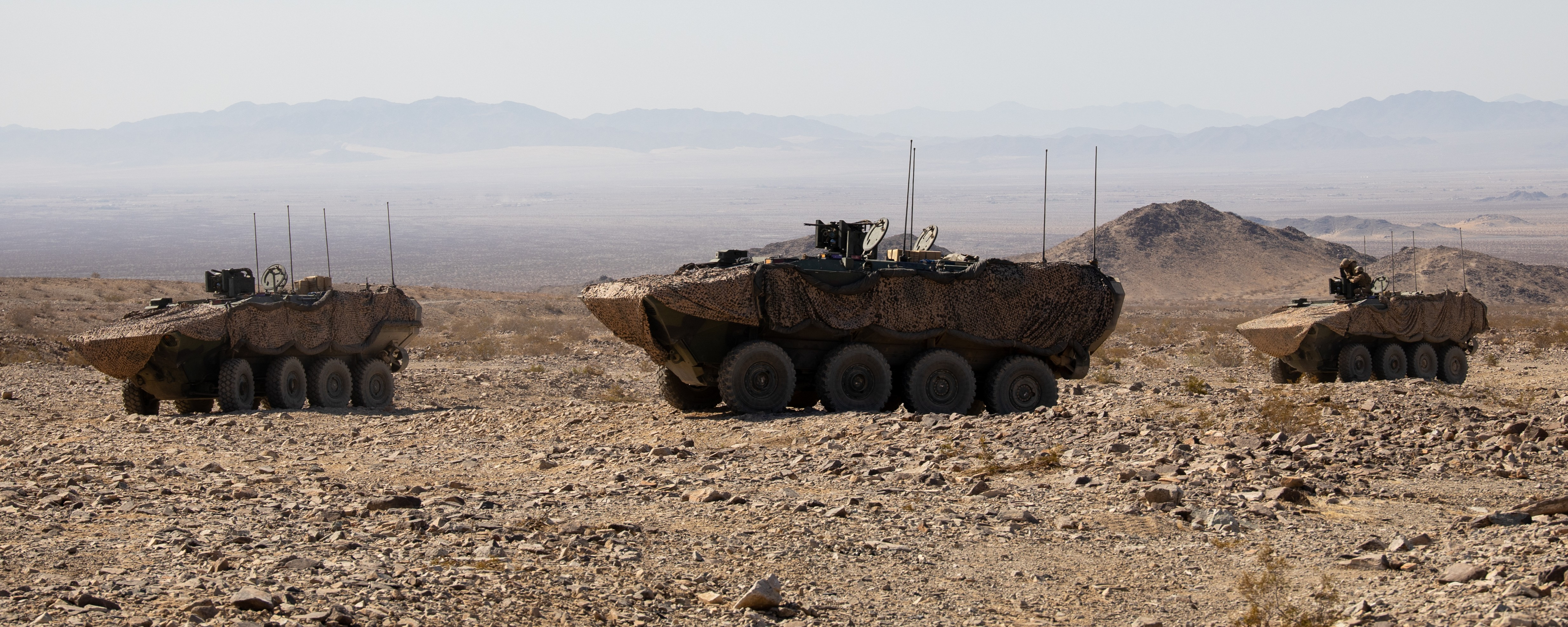
ACV-Ps armed with Mk-19s and an M2A1 Browning

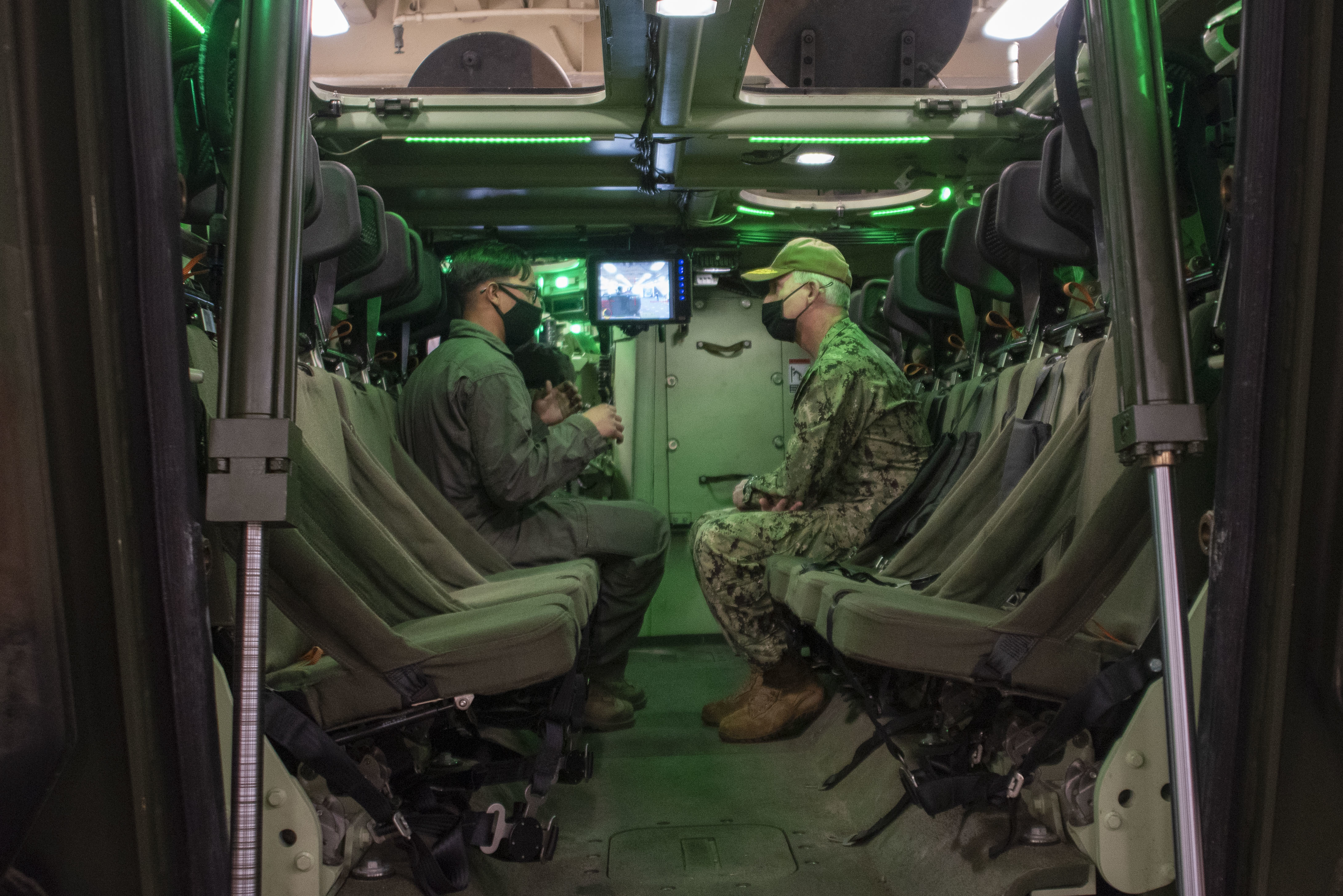
Interior of the ACV-P

==== ACV-R ====
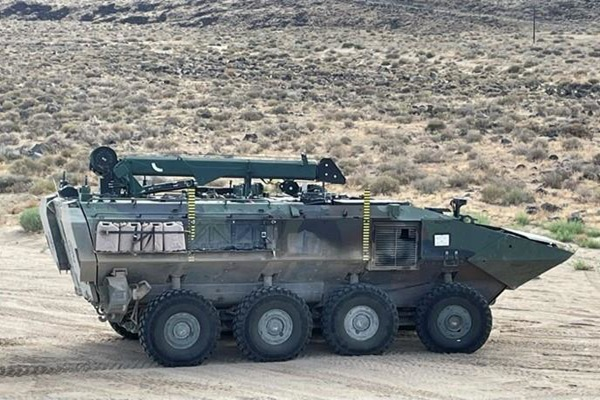
ACV-R

The ACV-R is the recovery variant of the ACV This variant provides field maintenance, recovery, and repair capabilities to the assault amphibian (AA) companies and battalion in support of the Marine division.

The contract for the design and development of this variant was signed in March 2022 for US$34.9 million. In April 2024, a contract to build and deliver production representative test vehicles (PRTV) of the ACV-R for US$79 million was signed. In September 2026, 32 vehicles were ordered from BAE Systems.

==== ACV-30 ====
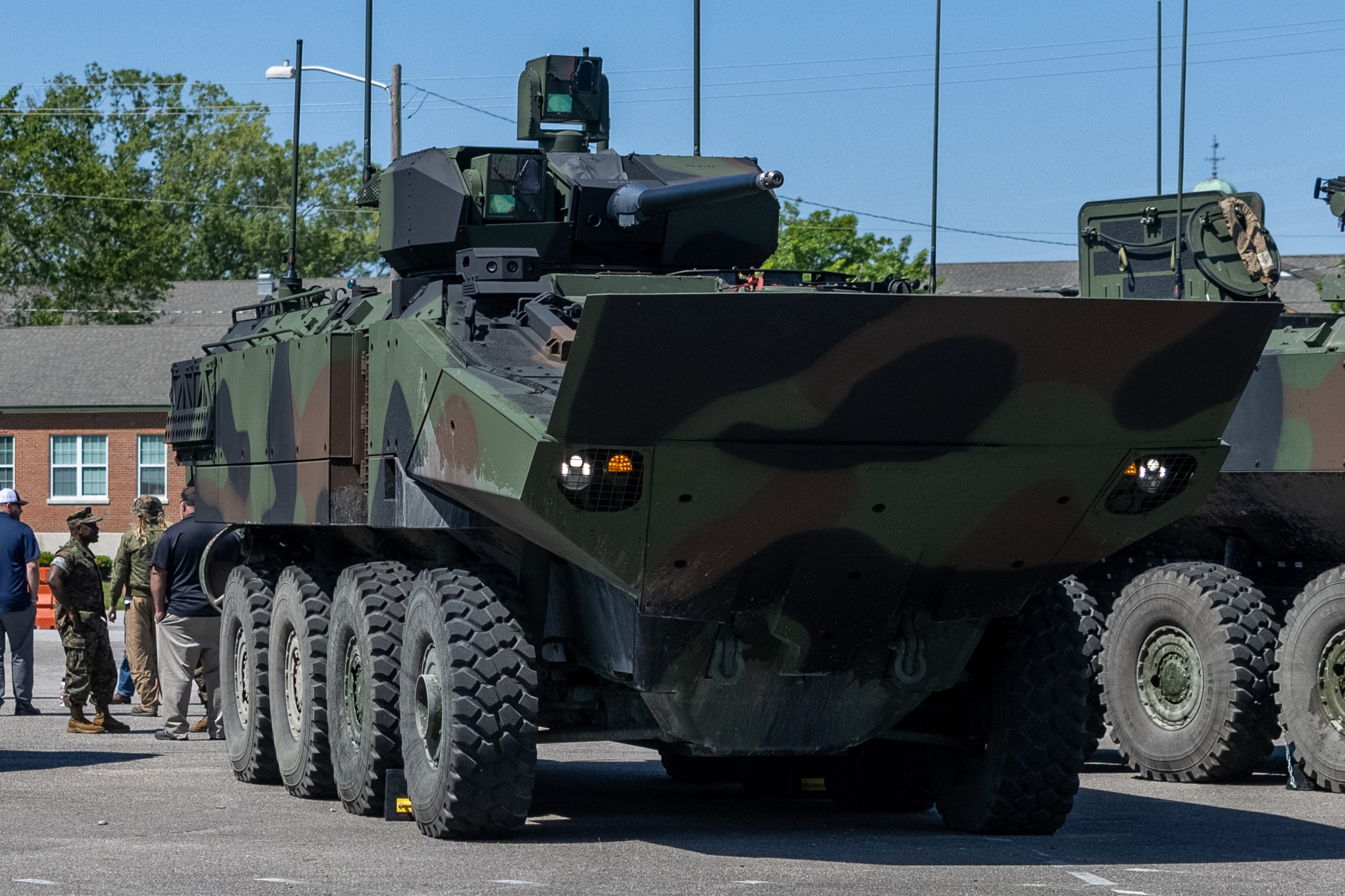
ACV-30

The ACV-30 is the Infantry Fighting variant of the ACV vehicle. It mounts a stabilized, medium-calibre weapon system to provide lethality and protection the Marines need while leaving ample room for troop capacity and payload. 175 of those vehicles are planned, with an Initial Operational Capability set for 2026.

This variant weight 35 t (77,000 lb), and has a payload of 3.30 t (7,300 lb). It is equipped with a Kongsberg RT-20 remote turret using the Mk44 Bushmaster II (XM813) chain gun, with a calibre of 30×173mm, and an M240 7.62mm coaxial machine gun. The ACV-30 can carry up to eight embarked marines, in addition to a three-person crew (driver, gunner, and vehicle commander). It also holds two days of supplies (food, water, and ammunition), up to 300 rounds for its autocannon, and up to 800 rounds for its machine gun.

In August 2022, the USMC awarded BAE Systems with a contract to manufacture multiple production-ready test vehicles (PRTV) for US$88 million.

In April 2025, USMC awarded BAE Systems a contract for the full-rate production of ACV-30. 30 vehicles were ordered.

=== Experimental variants ===
==== ACV C4/UAS ====
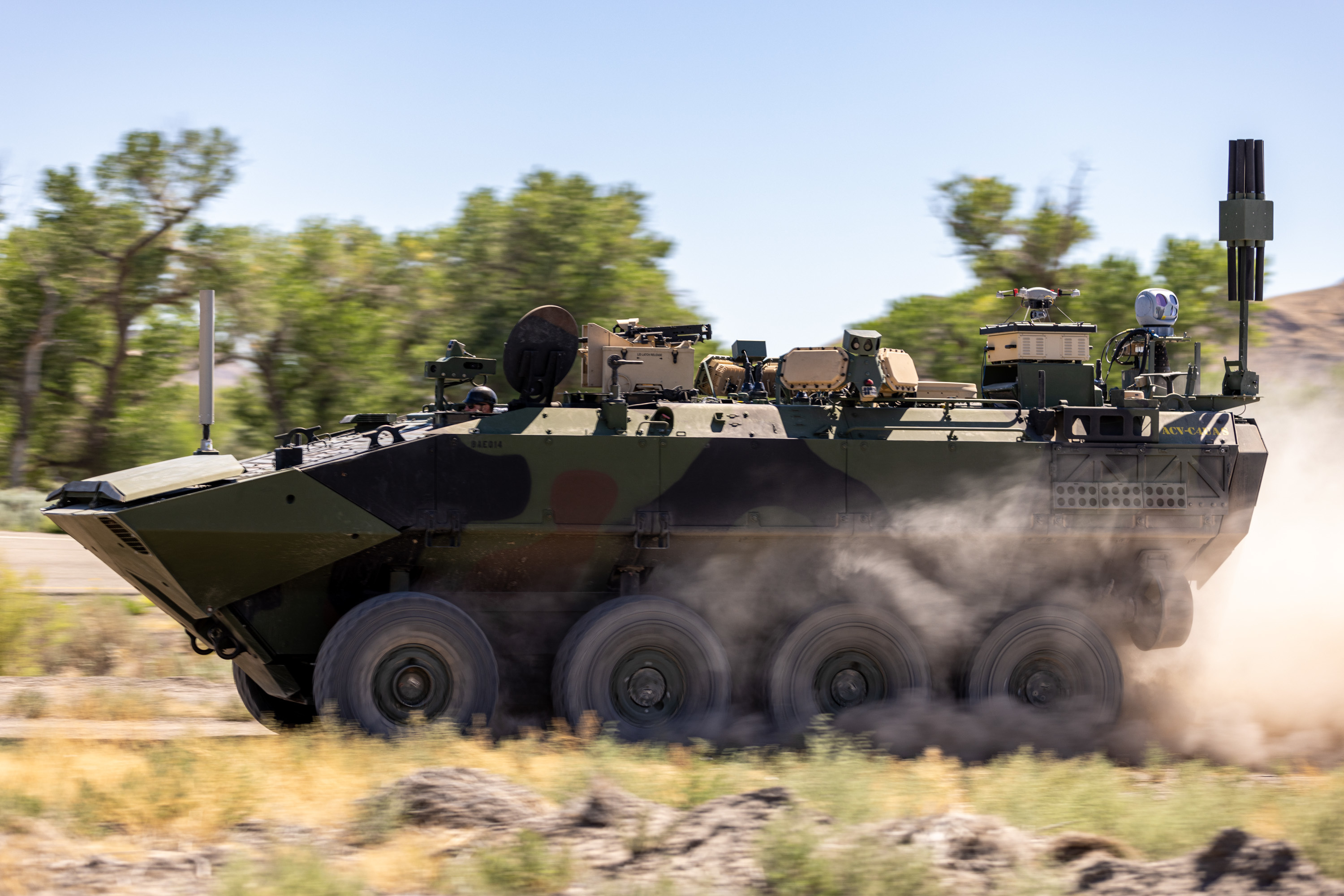
ACV C4/UAS

This variant is developed by Lockheed Martin Skunk Works. It is equipped with LM Stalker and Indago small UAS. This variant was also tested with a land drone, the IAI/ELTA Rex MkII unmanned infantry combat support system.

It aims at evaluating solutions for the Advanced Reconnaissance Program with a Government Off The Shelf (GOTS) solution. It focuses especially on the technological demonstration of the manned-unmanned teaming (MUM-T) capability.

=== Planned variants ===
==== ACV 2.0 ====
For this generation, it is planned as being a "true ship-to-shore connector", with a higher range at sea, and an increased speed. Some other variants are planned, and optionally manned ones are expected.

== Orders ==
=== Prototypes ===
United States (16 ACV 1.1)
In May 2015, BAE Systems signed a contract to deliver 16 ACV 1.1 prototypes under an engineering, manufacturing and development (EMD) contract for US$103.7 million.

=== LRIP (Low Rate Initial Production) ===
United States (116 ACV-P ordered)
Low Rate initial production
- Lot 1, June 2018, 30 ACV-P ordered for a value of US$198 million, with an option to deliver up to 204 vehicles for US$1.2 billion
- Lot 2, December 2018, 30 ACV-P ordered
- Lot 3, approved in July 2019
  - Lot 3a, October 2019, 30 ACV-P ordered
  - Lot 3b, February 2019, 26 vehicles ordered

=== FRP (Full Rate Production) ===
United States (206 ACV-P ordered + 29 ACV-C + 30 ACV-30 + 32 ACV-R)
The Full Rate Production was approved on 8 December 2020
- Lot 1 approved in December 2020
  - Lot 1a awarded in December 2020, 36 ACV-P ordered for US$184 million with Continuing Resolution funds
  - Lot 1b awarded in February 2021, 36 ACV-P ordered for US$183.8 million
- Lot 2
  - Lot 2a awarded in December 2021, 33 ACV-P ordered for $169 million with Continuing Resolution funds
  - Lot 2b awarded in March 2022, 36 ACV-P ordered for US$173.6 million
  - Lot 2c awarded in May 2022, 14 ACV-C ordered
- Lot 3
  - Lot 3a awarded in November 2022 with Continuing Resolution funds 30 ACV-P ordered
- Lot 4
  - March 2023, 40 vehicles ordered for US$256.8 million
    - 25 ACV-P for $145.3 million
    - 15 ACV-C for $111.5 million
  - November 2023, 40 vehicles ordered for US$211 million
    - 40 ACV-P for US$211 million
- April 2025, 30 ACV-30 for $188.5-million
- September 2026, 32 ACV-R for $230 million

=== Orders for Turrets ===
United States (175 Protector RT20)
Contract announced in November 2024 for 175 remote controlled turrets for a value of USD $329 million for the ACV-30 variant.
The contract is to arm the ACV-30 of the Lot 5 and Lot 6.
Final contract for 101 RT-20 turrets for ACV-30 in August 2025 for $118-million.

== See also ==
=== Comparable vehicles ===
- Stryker/LAV AFV/ASLAV/LAV III – (Canada)
- TATA Kestrel – (India)
- K808 White Tiger – (South Korea)
- Freccia IFV – (Italy)
- BTR-90 – (Russia)
- VPK-7829 Bumerang – (Russia)
- Boxer AFV – (Germany, Netherlands)
- CM-32 armoured vehicle – (Taiwan)
- ZBL-08 – (China)
- Type 96 armored personnel carrier – (Japan)
- Patria AMV – (Finland)
- BTR-4 – (Ukraine)
- Saur 2 – (Romania)
- VBCI – (France)
- KTO Rosomak – (Poland)
- FNSS Pars – (Turkey)
- Mowag Piranha – (Switzerland)
- Terrex ICV – (Singapore)
