= Terrex ICV =

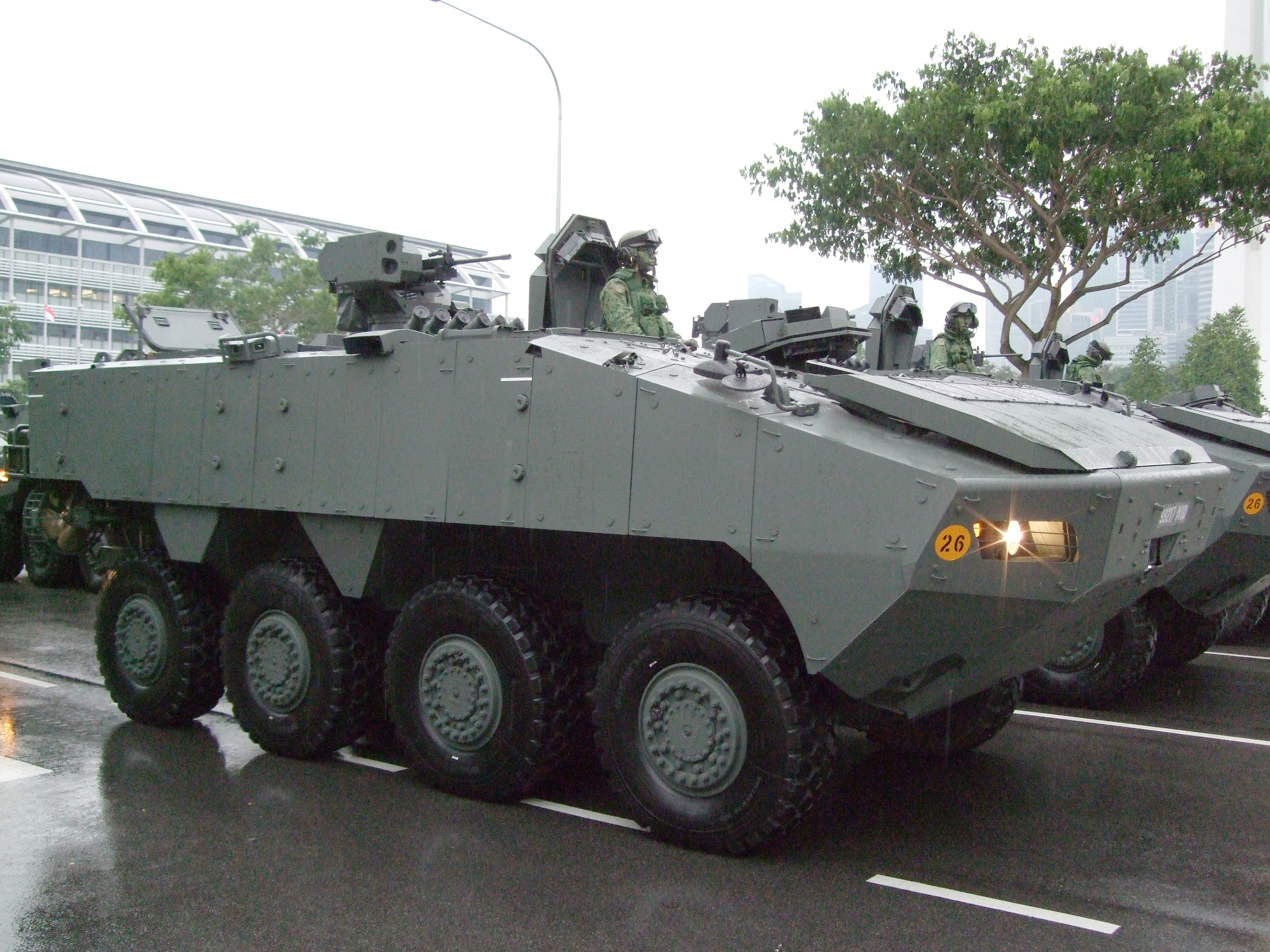
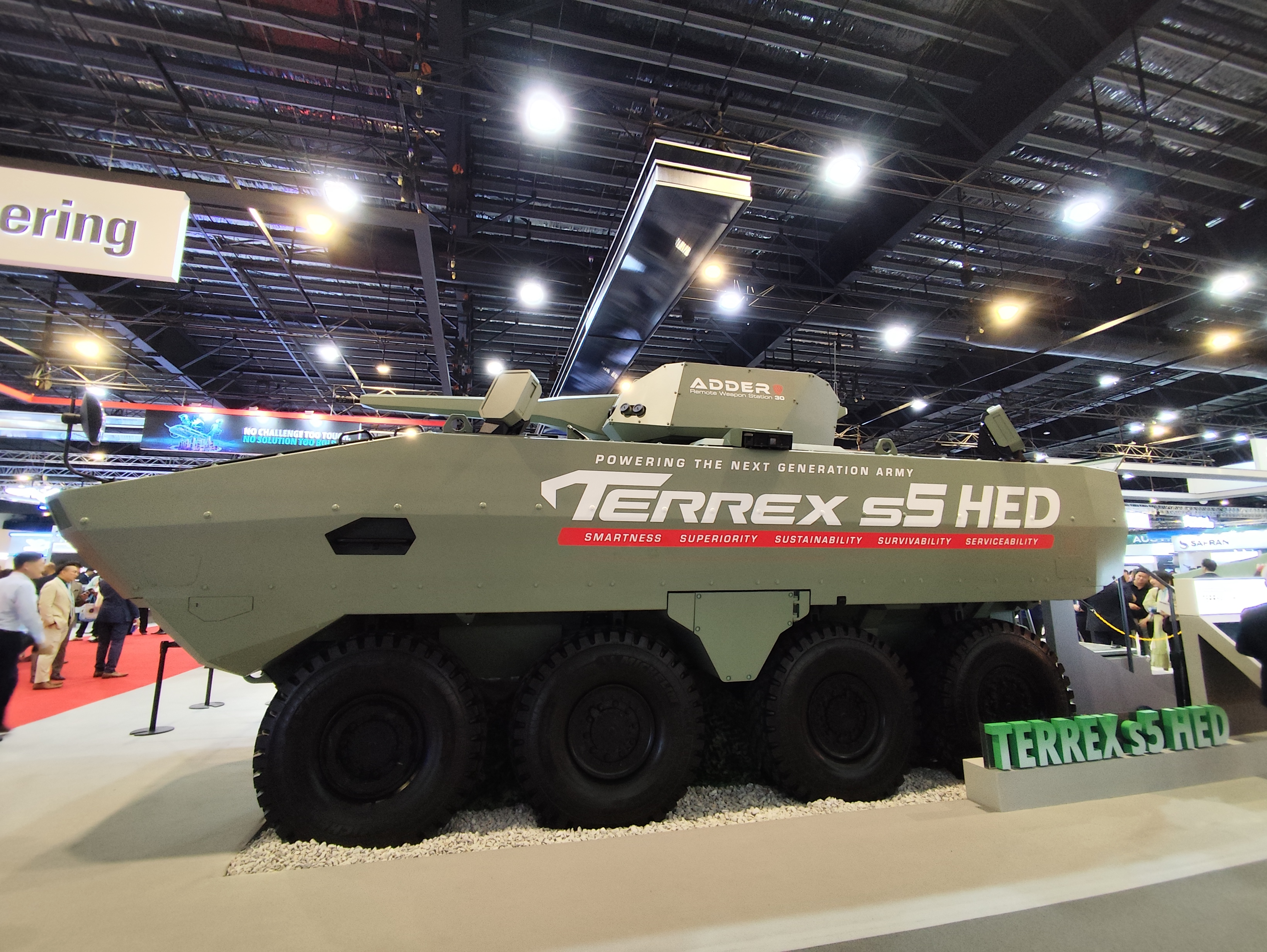
- (Top) Terrex 1 ICV in service with the Singapore Army (Bottom) Terrex s5 Hybrid Electric Drive (HED) exhibited at the 2026 Singapore Airshow.
- Type: Armoured combat vehicle
- Place of origin: Singapore

Service history
- Used by: Singapore Army

Production history
- Designer: ST Kinetics (formerly); ST Engineering; Timoney of Ireland
- Designed: 2004
- Manufacturer: ST Kinetics (formerly); ST Engineering; Kazakhstan Paramount Engineering
- Produced: 2006
- Variants: See variants

Specifications
- Mass: 24 tonnes (53,000 lb)
- Length: 7.8 metres (25 ft 7 in)
- Width: 3 m (9 ft 10 in)
- Height: 2.5 m (8 ft 2 in)
- Crew: 2 (Commander, Driver) + 11 troops
- Armour: Classified, Modular
- Main armament: STK 40 AGL with 60 rounds
- Secondary armament: 7.62 mm Co-axial with 250 rounds, CIS SGL with 5 rounds
- Engine: Caterpillar Inc. C9 inline-six diesel engine 400 horsepower (300 kW)
- Power/weight: 16 hp/tonne
- Suspension: 8×8 Hydropneumatic Double wishbone suspension
- Operational range: 800 kilometres (500 mi)
- Maximum speed: 110 kilometres per hour (68 mph) on road, 10 kilometres per hour (6.2 mph) on water

The Terrex Infantry Carrier Vehicle (ICV) is an 8×8 armoured fighting vehicle (AFV) developed by the former ST Kinetics (presently part of ST Engineering) of Singapore and Timoney Technology of Ireland, and produced by ST Engineering and by Kazakhstan Paramount Engineering (KPE) under license as the Barys-A.

Built on a 8×8 wheel chassis with modern military vehicle armour, the Terrex is approximately 25 to 30 tonnes, and is amphibious in certain configurations. Multiple-type weapon platforms are supported, including both remote and overhead weapon stations. The vehicle has a double V-shaped hull which deflects mine and IED blasts, and is fitted with NBC protection system and battlefield management system for better awareness.

ST Engineering Land Systems is marketing the Terrex to potential buyers in Asia, South America and the Middle East.

== Production history and development ==
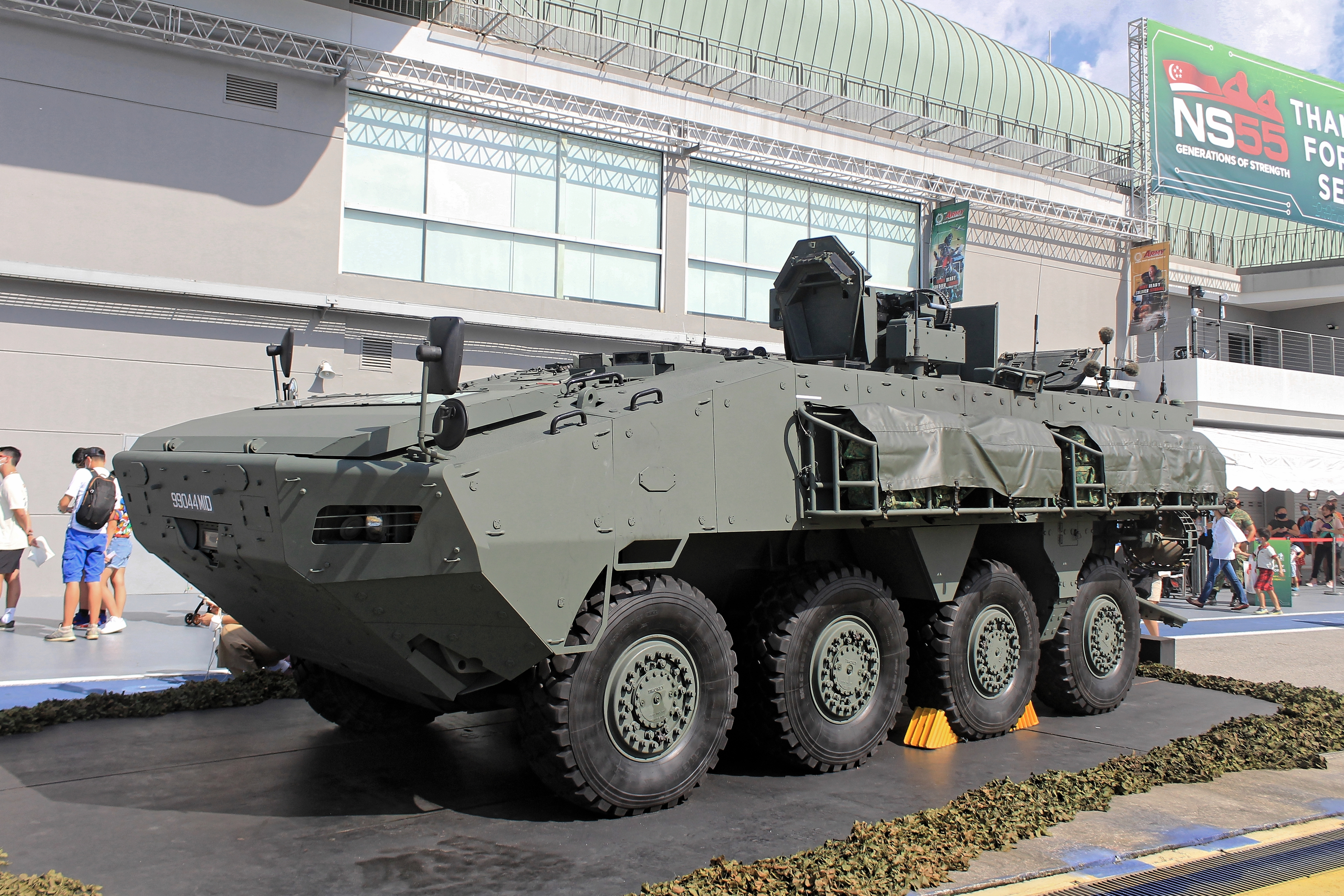
Terrex ICV at the Army Open House 2022

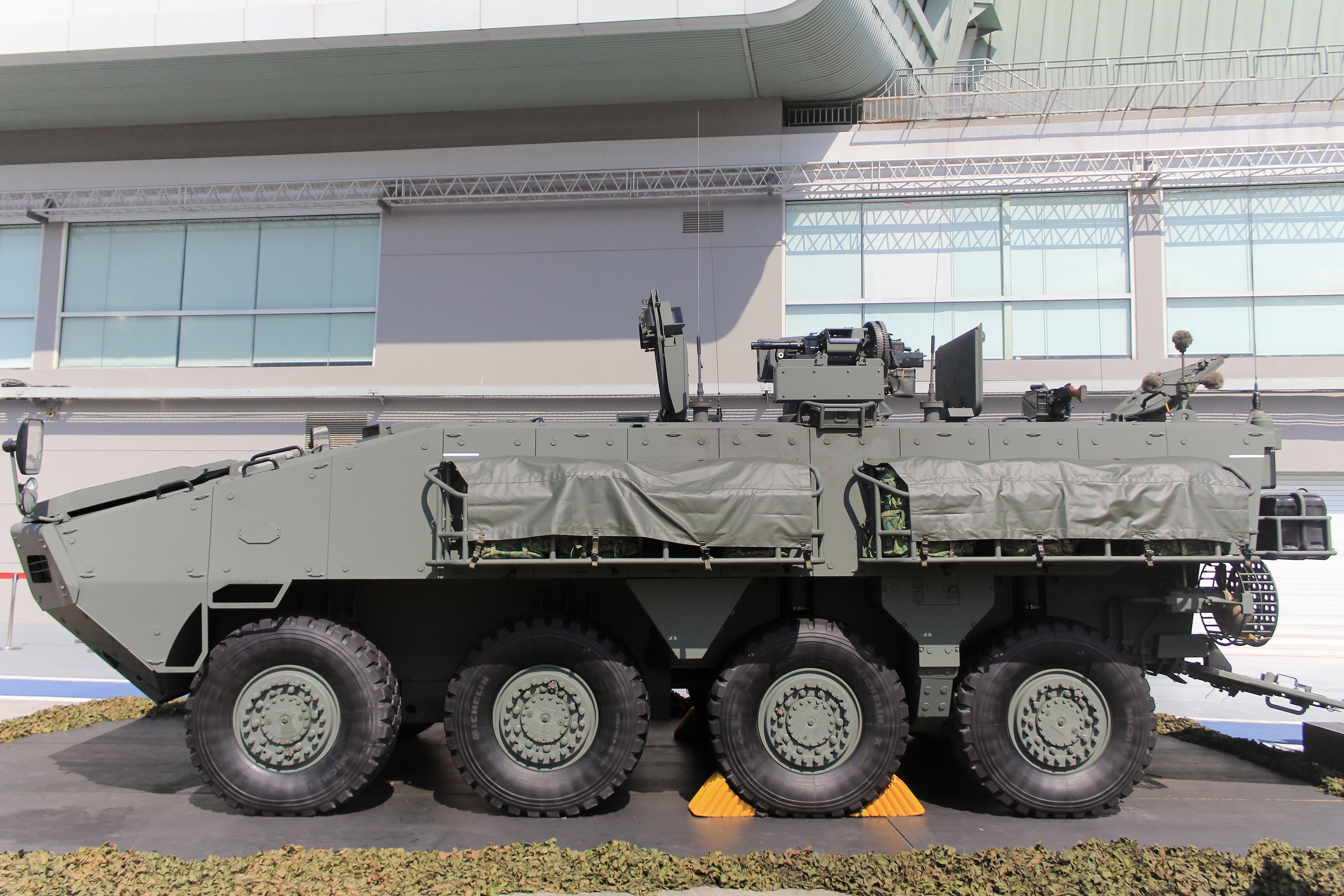
Side profile of the Terrex ICV

=== Terrex AV-81/82 ===
The Terrex project started as a government-funded project to help develop a new generation of armoured personnel carriers for the Singapore Armed Forces (SAF). Singapore Technologies Kinetics (now Singapore Technologies Engineering Land Systems) was chosen to design and manufacture the vehicle. The prototype Terrex AV-81 armoured fighting vehicle was exhibited for the first time at DSEi 2001. The initial AV-81 design utilised conventional coil-spring shock absorbers, but later variants introduced of hydro-pneumatic struts with real-time damping control. An electric-hybrid drive system was also developed.

By mid-2004, one prototype and one pre-production model had been built and both were evaluated throughout Asia and Europe, where the vehicle was offered for a number of emerging wheeled armoured vehicle requirements. This was further influenced by the U.S. Army's emerging Interim Brigade Combat Team (IBCT) concept, which called for the need of wheeled armoured fighting vehicles (AFV) as opposed to tracked AFVs.

Following an agreement in 2002 between ST Engineering and Turkish automotive manufacturer Otokar Otobus Karoseri Sanayi A.S., an improved Terrex prototype, Yavuz, was developed in conjunction with Otokar in 2005. Intended for production by Otokar for the Turkish Land Forces and possible export customers, it was equipped with a more advanced driveline and hydro-pneumatic suspension system and a number of changes from the AV-81, including a flat underbody instead of a V-shaped hull and revised rear suspension. While the Yavuz received no production orders, it attracted the attention of the SAF, which provided funding for the further development of the prototype as the Terrex AV-82.

In 2009, the SAF announced it would acquire at least 135 Terrex ICVs to replace its V-200 armoured vehicles, with all active Infantry and Guards battalions to begin training to operate from the vehicle in February 2010. The Second Battalion, Singapore Infantry Regiment, was the first unit to receive the Terrex as part of its shift into a motorised infantry battalion.

=== Terrex 2: MPC/ACV ===
In August 2012, the U.S. Marine Corps awarded SAIC a developmental contract for the Terrex for the Marine Personnel Carrier program. The Marine Personnel Carrier was put on hold in June 2013, restarted in February 2014, and then restructured as Phase 1 of the Amphibious Combat Vehicle (ACV) program, which includes the previous MPC competitor entries.

On 18 July 2013, SAIC, along with ST Engineering Land Systems and Armatec Survivability Corporation, successfully completed two weeks of evaluations of the Terrex at Camp Pendleton. The tests included a series of water performance demonstrations in various sea conditions and an evaluation of human factors and stowage capacity. The Terrex completed all required surf transit and ocean swim maneuverability tests at its fully loaded combat weight. It demonstrated load capabilities through successful stowage of gear and supplies that Marines would require for three days of operations, with space available for additional equipment. The human factors evaluation demonstrated the spacious interior by accommodating the specified number of combat-equipped Marines and enabling rapid tactical and emergency egress through a quick-release hatch. The Terrex repeated ocean swim and maneuverability results were achieved in a March 2013 rehearsal event. SAIC began ballistic and blast tests at the Nevada Automotive Test Center in May 2013, and was scheduled to complete all ballistic and mine blast demonstrations in July.

The Terrex submitted for the ACV program, called the Terrex 2, was publicly unveiled in September 2015 at the DSEI 2015 convention. The Terrex 2 was designed to enhance situational awareness, with the troop commander's station equipped with a screen covering all aspects outside the vehicle, also visible to the squad to enable them to see what they would be exiting to. The driver's station was equipped with several screens with obstacle avoidance, situational awareness sensor feeds, and other features. The Terrex's V-over-V hull creates a crush zone to reduce the impact of a blast on the floor; footrests attached to seats across the aisle keep the Marines' feet from absorbing blast energy. Although specialised in ground operations, it also meets the minimum requirements for safe sea operation. The vehicle uses a central tire inflation system, can swim 7 mph (11 km/h; 6.1 kn) in water, and has excess buoyancy of 23 percent. It weighs 32.5 tons (65,000 lb (29,000 kg)), carries three crew and 11 embarked Marines, and can reach 55 mph (89 km/h) on paved roads.

On 24 November 2015, the Marines selected the SAIC Terrex, along with the BAE Systems/Iveco SuperAV, to move on to the engineering and manufacturing development phase of the ACV 1.1 program. SAIC was awarded a $121.5 million contract to build 16 vehicles by late 2016 for testing. In June 2018, the Marine Corps selected BAE Systems for the ACV program.

=== Sentinel 2: L400-2 MCRC ===
The Sentinel 2 was jointly designed and developed by ST Engineering and Elbit Systems of Australia (ELSA) to meet the Australian Army's LAND 400 Phase 2 Mounted Combat Reconnaissance Capability (MCRC) requirement for an armored reconnaissance vehicle. A further development of the Terrex 2 using hull and powerpack components, it is better protected and carries a much more powerful armament but lacks amphibious capability due to its 35 tonne weight. Designed with Elbit Land System's MT30 modular turret, the vehicle is operated by a crew of 2 and can carry 11 dismounts. It was outbid by the Rheinmetall Boxer CRV in early 2018. 19 Sentinel 2s were later supplied by Elbit Land Systems to Ghana in 2020.

=== Terrex s5 (TITAN) ===
At the 2024 Singapore Airshow, ST Engineering unveiled the Terrex s5 (Smartness, Superiority, Sustainability, Survivability and Serviceability). The Terrex s5 is the latest iteration of the Terrex ICV lineage, intended to be a new 8×8 family competitive on the export market. It features considerable digital technologies and systems, able to project a stereoscopic view of the surrounding environment to its crew and also features waypoint driving, obstacle detection, a 360° prismatic camera system, and coupling with UGVs and UAVs. The chassis has enhanced protection, stated to be STANAG Level 4, and comes with independent suspension for each of the eight wheels. The suspension can be upgraded to active suspension and the wheels upgraded to run-flat tires. Furthermore, it features a hybrid-electric drive that helps push the vehicle to 120 km/h on roads (~75 mph) and also features a "Silent Mode" with a running radius of 50 km using on-board Li-ion batteries.

The Terrex s5 is intended to be modular to suit a variety of missions. Six variants have been revealed: the Trooper, a command vehicle, an ATGM vehicle, a Fire Support Vehicle fitted with either a 105 mm or 120 mm cannon, a mortar vehicle, and an amphibious variant. The variant shown at the 2024 Singapore Airshow is the Trooper, utilizing ST Engineering's ADDER Remote Weapon Station, armed with a 30 autocannon that is likely a Mk44 Bushmaster II, as on the Hunter AFV.

ST Engineering was awarded a contract by the Ministry of Defence (MINDEF) in December 2025 for the acquisition of the Terrex s5 as the SAF’s next-generation TITAN Infantry Fighting Vehicle (IFV). The delivery of TITAN is scheduled to begin in 2028.

== Design ==
As with a number of other recent wheeled armoured vehicles, the Terrex is of modular design with various levels of armour protection and weapon systems being marketed up to a gross vehicle weight of 24,000 kg. Despite its size, the Terrex is air-portable by C-130 or other similar cargo aircraft.

The Terrex's layout is conventional: the driver sits front left and the power pack is to the right. This leaves the rest of the vehicle clear for the troop compartment, which is provided with a power-operated ramp and roof hatches.

Various weapon systems can be fitted on the roof, including a remote weapon station armed with a 40mm automatic grenade launcher and a 7.62mm coaxial machine gun or a complete stabilized turret armed with a 25mm M242 Bushmaster cannon and 7.62mm coaxial machine gun. Additional 7.62mm machine guns can be mounted over the rear troop compartment. In addition, the vehicle can be configured to carry varying combat payloads, from turret-based weapon stations (including 105 mm tank guns) to rocket launchers, with a reduced number of personnel carried. The modular top deck allows for quick configuration changes to be carried out.

The Terrex uses a patented independent double wishbone suspension, which greatly improves ground mobility and ride comfort over rough terrain. The use of automatic traction control and the capacity for large footprint off-road tires enables it to travel at unprecedented speeds in soft ground conditions.

The Terrex is designed with a modular protection system with all-round protection against 7.62 mm NATO rounds and artillery shell splinters, front arc withstands 12.7 mm armor piercing-rounds at the most basic armor package. Ceramic-composite armor package are available for a higher level of protection. Maximum level of all-round protection is against 14.5 mm armor-piercing rounds.

The vehicle has a double hull with an external V-hull that improves mine blast survivability and can withstand up to 12 kg TNT explosion under the hull with the vehicle still able to move. Add-on armour provides further protection for troops. It is also capable of providing full NBC (nuclear, biological, chemical) protection in extreme operational conditions.

The standard equipment includes a powered steering on four wheels at the front, a central tyre-pressure inflation system, an anti-lock braking system and an NBC defensive/protective system but there are also many other options for fitted equipment and vehicle gear available.

In its baseline configuration, the AV-81 Terrex is fully amphibious: two water jets mounted on either side at the back of the hull propel the vehicle through water at 10 km/h.

== Variants ==
The following known variants are in service:

- Command Variant
- 40mm AGL/7.62mm Coaxial MG Variant
- .50 calibre HMG Variant
- SPIKE ATGM Variant
- Pioneer Variant
- Medical Variant
- Reconnaissance, Surveillance, and Target Acquisition (RSTA) Variant
- STORM Variant

== Incidents ==
On 23 November 2016, nine Terrex vehicles used by the SAF for a military exercise in Taiwan were seized while in port at Hong Kong, resulting in heightened political tensions between Singapore and China. They were initially impounded at an outdoor storage yard of a Hong Kong Customs and Excise Department storage facility in Tuen Mun, but by 6 December, they had been moved indoors. On 24 January 2017, the Hong Kong government stated that it would allow the detained Terrexes to return to Singapore. The vehicles were returned to Singapore on 30 January 2017.

== Operators ==
=== Current operators ===
Ghana

- Ghana Army – 19 Sentinel 2s in total, 6 Sentinel IIs in 8×8 equipped with Elbit Systems UT30 turrets with 10 Sentinel IIs in 6×6 for recon missions

Singapore

- Singapore Army – 435

=== Potential operators ===
Chile (> 200)

- The Terrex ICV is among the competitors being considered by the Chilean Army as a successor to its 160 Piraña I 6×6 and 30 Piraña I 8×8. More than 200 vehicles are expected to be purchased, with the first phase of the replacement including a tender for 82 8×8 armoured vehicles.

Kazakhstan

- In December 2024, ST Engineering announced that it had secured a strategic partnership with Kazakhstan Paramount Engineering (KPE) to set up production capabilities for a new amphibious combat vehicle based on the Terrex 2, the Barys-A 8×8, in Kazakhstan. Up to 500 vehicles will be manufactured by KPE from 2025, and will undergo trials later in the year.
