= Iveco SuperAV =

SuperAV
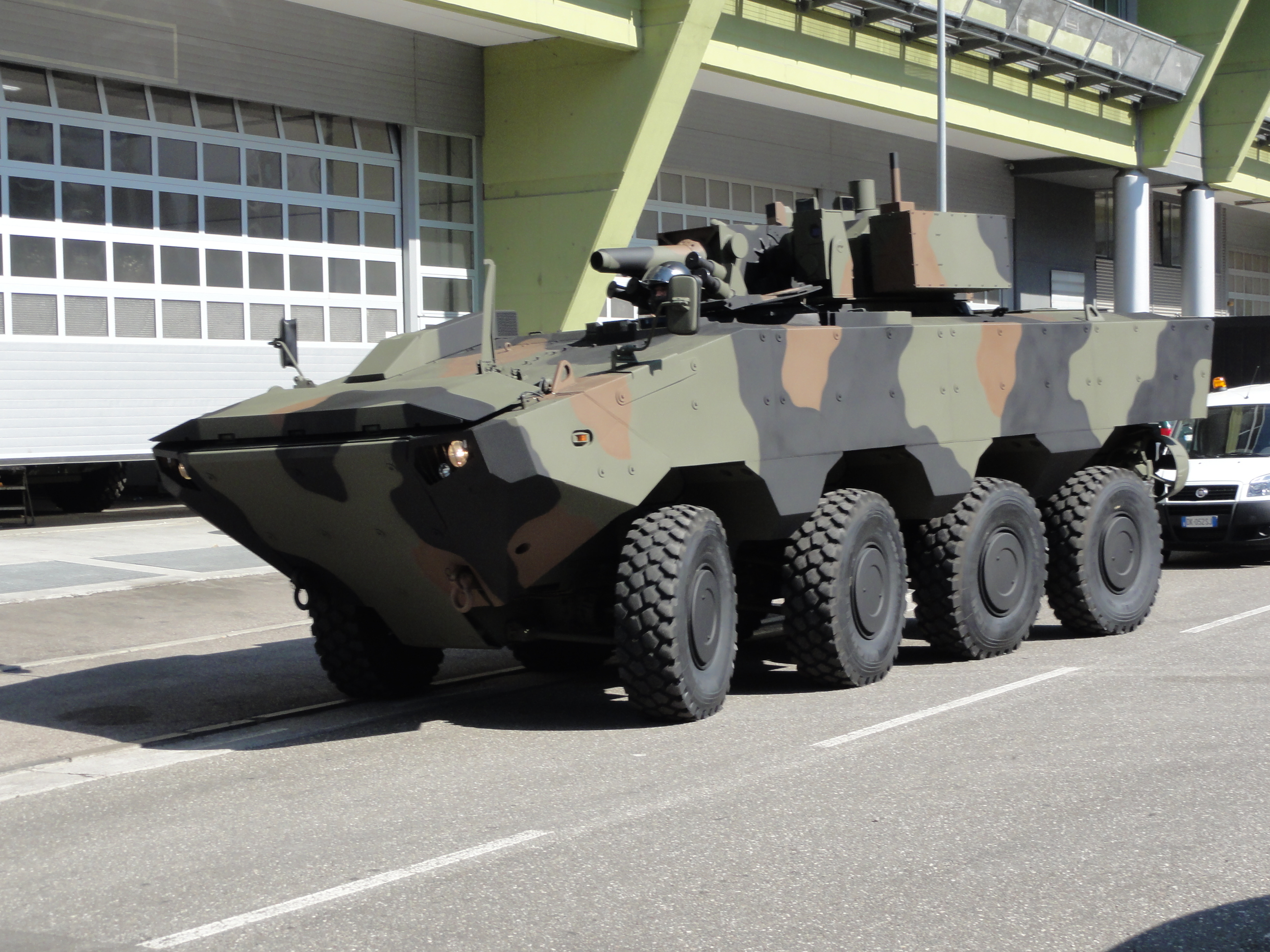
- SuperAV
- Type: Armored personnel carrier
- Place of origin: Italy

Production history
- Manufacturer: Iveco
- Developed into: Amphibious Combat Vehicle

Specifications
- Mass: 15-24 short tons
- Length: 7.9 m
- Width: 2.7 or 3.0 m
- Height: 2.3 m
- Crew: 1
- Passengers: 8-12
- Main armament: Varies
- Engine: Iveco Cursor 13 6L turbocharged multifuel diesel engine 500-560 hp
- Power/weight: 21.5 hp/t
- Suspension: hydro-pneumatic independent
- Operational range: 500 mi (800 km) on land; 40 mi (64 km) in water
- Maximum speed: 105 km/h (65 mph) on land; 10 km/h (6.2 mph) in water

The Iveco SuperAV is an eight-wheel drive tactical vehicle developed by the Italian commercial vehicle company Iveco. A version made in collaboration with BAE Systems was selected by the United States Marine Corps for the Amphibious Combat Vehicle program.

== Design ==
=== Mobility ===
The SuperAV is an 8x8 wheeled amphibious vehicle. It is powered by an Iveco Cursor 13 6L turbocharged multifuel diesel engine coupled with a ZF 7HP902 gearbox (seven forward and one reverse). It has a top speed of 105 km/h (65 mph) on land and 10 km/h (6.2 mph) on water. The vehicle's range is 500 mi (800 km) on land and 40 mi (64 km) on water.

The wheels have a central tire inflation system and run-flat tires. The SuperAV is fully amphibious, able to operate in and over sea state 3. It can be air transported by a C-130 Hercules or an Airbus A400M.

=== Protection ===
Iveco claims the SuperAV has the highest protection level in its class. It incorporates a high hardness monocoque steel hull, able to protect the crew from small arms fire, artillery shell splinters, landmines, and IEDs. Add-on armor kits are available. The vehicle has NBC protection and automatic fire suppression systems.

=== Armament ===
The SuperAV can be fitted with weapons systems up to 40 mm in remote weapons stations or turrets. If a two-man manned turret is installed, troops capacity is reduced from 12 to 8. If a remote turret is installed, troops capacity is only reduced to 10.

=== Versions ===
==== Iveco SuperAV ====
The SuperAV is available as an armoured personnel carrier, anti-tank vehicle, mortar carrier, engineer vehicle, recovery vehicle, ambulance, and command post vehicle.

==== Iveco SuperAV Land ====
A land variant is being developed by Iveco.

==== ACV variants ====
- ACV personnel carrier (ACV-P)
- ACV command (ACV-C)
- ACV 30 mm cannon (ACV-30)
- ACV recovery (ACV-R)

== History ==
In 2010, the SuperAV was offered to the Italian Army for their requirement for an amphibious vehicle to replace the AAVTP-7A1 and was selected.

=== ACV ===
In 2011, Iveco entered an agreement with BAE Systems to offer the SuperAV to the United States Marine Corps in their Marine Personnel Carrier program. In August 2012, the SuperAV was selected along with three other vehicles for further demonstration and study. BAE had to redesign the original SuperAV to make it compatible with the Marine Corps mandate that any designs be based on existing platforms.

The MPC submission was modified to carry three crew and nine 1.90 m (6 ft 3 in) tall marines standing, each weighing 220 lb (100 kg) with gear. It had a V-shaped hull to withstand strong bomb blasts and could travel up to 10 nmi (12 mi; 19 km) from a dock landing ship to shore and back. The unit cost was $3.5 million. The vehicle swam through the water using two counter-rotating propellers, each with 284 kN (65,000 lb (29,000 kg)) of thrust.

On 8 May 2013, BAE and Iveco successfully completed 12 days of evaluations on the SuperAV for the MPC program at Camp Pendleton. The evaluations included a water performance demonstrations in various sea conditions, as well as human factors and stowage capacity. The SuperAV, weighing 26 tons, exceeded all vehicle requirements, performing personnel exit drills in less than 17 seconds and showcasing advanced interior layout and compartmentalization that allowed for the stowage of more than three days of supplies without jeopardizing the survivability of the vehicle and personnel. Similar tests conducted by Iveco confirmed the vehicle's ability to be launched and recovered from ships and transition in surf zones. BAE and Iveco then prepared for survivability demonstrations in the summer.

The Marine Personnel Carrier was put on hold in June 2013, restarted in February 2014, and then restructured as Phase 1 of the Amphibious Combat Vehicle (ACV) program, which includes the previous MPC competitor entries. BAE submitted the SuperAV as their ACV 1.1 entry on 20 May 2015.

The BAE/Iveco version of the SuperAV submitted to the Marines carries a crew of three with 11 embarked Marines; key to the design is its ability to already meet ACV 1.2 requirements, being configured for 13 seats, having the ability to launch and recover from a well deck, and being able to integrate an unmanned turret with a heavy cannon. Iveco's H-Drive System provides power to individual wheels, simulating a tracked vehicle, so it can continue operating if any wheels are damaged or blown off and has better mobility in soft soil or sand.

Since the H-Drive System eliminates axles through use of a string of three shafts on each side, a V-shaped hull is able to be used for blast protection, and the floor is also not connected to the hull, instead bolting onto the bottom of the seats, creating less headroom for occupants but absorbing more energy from an underbody blast. Space in the interior is taken up by pipes, wires, and things needed to make systems run, but that is because the space behind the seats is reserved for Marines' gear.

Fuel tanks are external for passenger protection, and unlike the AAV, the SuperAV doesn't expel black smoke upon engine start and has a quietly running engine. The SuperAV uses a 690 hp engine to propel the vehicle at 6 knots (6.9 mph; 11 km/h) in water and up to 65 mph (105 km/h) on land; reserve buoyancy is 21 percent. It weighs 29 tonnes (63,000 lb) with a 6,000 lb (2,700 kg) payload capacity, and has a range of 10 nmi (12 mi; 19 km) at sea followed by 200 mi (320 km) on land, or 350 mi (560 km) entirely on land.

On 24 November 2015, the Marines selected the BAE Systems/Iveco SuperAV, along with the SAIC Terrex, to move on to the engineering and manufacturing development phase of the ACV 1.1 program. BAE was awarded a $103.8 million contract to build 16 vehicles by late 2016 for testing, which will begin in early 2017 and last one year. The company plans to build its ACV prototypes at its York, Pennsylvania facility. A final winner is planned to be chosen in 2018 to build 204 vehicles, with the first entering service in 2020 and all delivered by 2023.

On 19 June 2018, the Marine Corps announced that BAE Systems had been selected to deliver vehicles for the ACV 1.1 program to begin replacing the Amphibious Assault Vehicle; 30 low-rate production vehicles will be built with deliveries beginning in late 2019. The Marine Corps plans to buy 204 ACV 1.1 vehicles in this first phase of the effort with initial operating capability planned for early 2020, fielding in late 2020, and full operational capability scheduled for 2023. The design will be upgraded before moving on to the ACV 1.2 phase.

On 15 October 2020, Iveco announced that the first fleet of 18 ACVs had been delivered to a platoon of Marines after five years of testing development. They were officially introduced into Marine Corps service on 4 November. Initial Operational Capability (IOC) was declared on 13 November, and full-rate production was approved on 10 December.

== Operators ==
=== Current operators ===
United States (objective of 632)
Variants ordered:
- BAE ACV-P
- BAE ACV-C
- BAE ACV-30
- BAE ACV-R

=== Future operators ===
Italy (36)
Italian Navy: 36 Iveco SUPERAV ordered in 2023.

Spain
Selected to be the successor to the AAV-7A1 in a first phase, and it could replace the Piranha IIIC 8×8. It would be produced under licence in Spain.

=== Potential operators ===
Chile (500)
Potential orders of the Chilean Armed Forces:
- Chilean Army: Between 450 and 500 units Iveco SUPERAV.
- Chilean Navy
  - Chilean Marine Corps: 30 Amphibious Combat Vehicle.
Italy (110)
Planned complementary orders of the Italian armed forces:
- Italian Navy: 28 Iveco SUPERAV
- Italian Army: 64 Iveco SUPERAV
- Italian Army Engineer Corps: 18 Iveco SUPERAV
Qatar (hundreds)
The Qatar Armed Forces are looking to purchase hundreds of 8×8 armoured fighting vehicles. The existing competitors are:
- Iveco SUPERAV Land
- BMC ALTUG
- Boxer
- LAV-700 "Desert Viper"
- VBCI-2
