= Expeditionary Fighting Vehicle =

Cancelled American amphibious assault vehicle

Expeditionary Fighting Vehicle, Advanced Amphibious Assault Vehicle (AAAV)
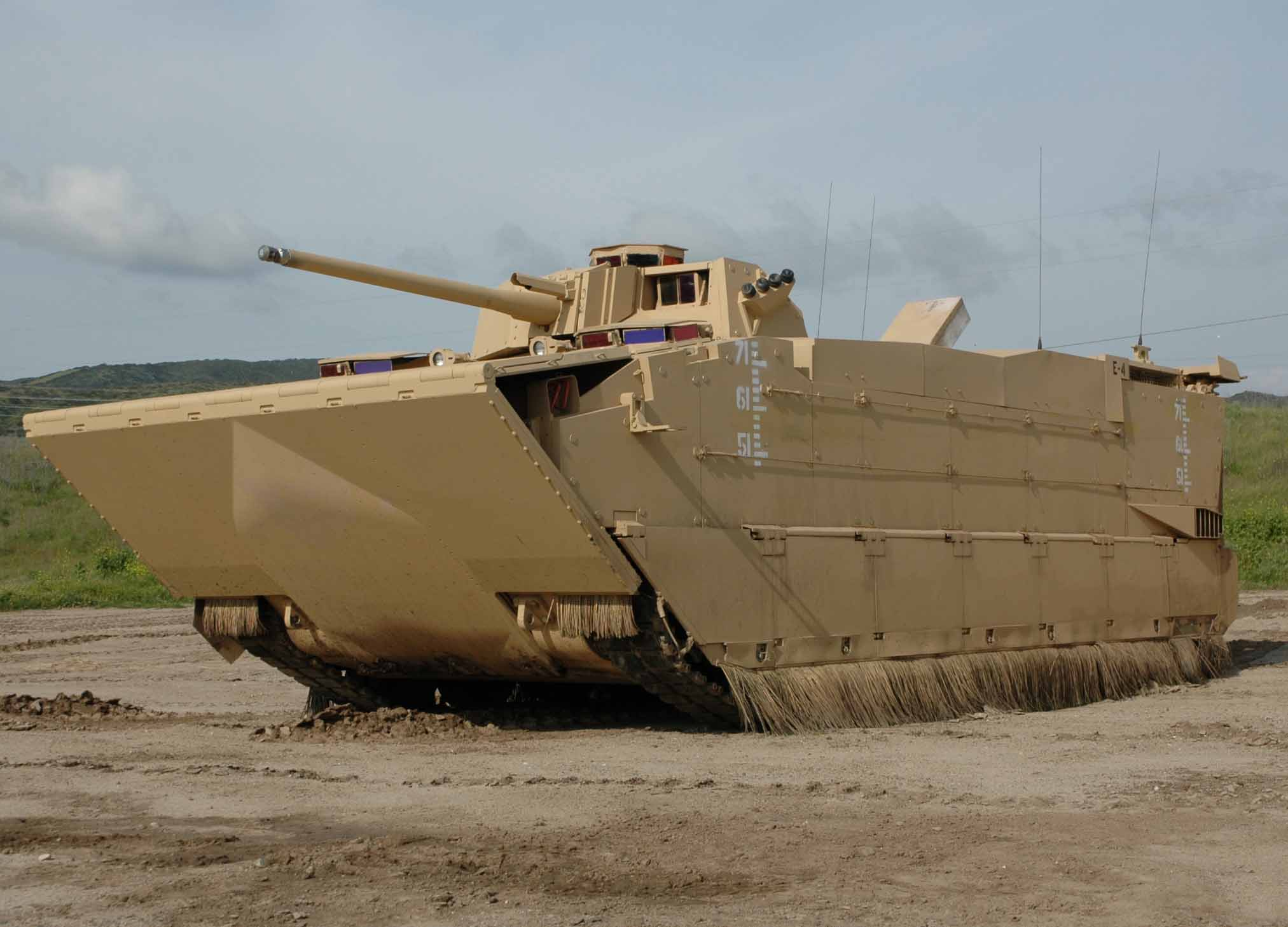
- General Dynamics Expeditionary Fighting Vehicle, Advanced Amphibious Assault Vehicle (AAAV)
- Type: Amphibious assault vehicle
- Place of origin: United States

Service history
- In service: Project cancelled
- Used by: United States Marine Corps

Production history
- Manufacturer: General Dynamics
- Unit cost: US$22.3 million
- Variants: EFVP; EFVC

Specifications
- Mass: Empty: 67,300 lb (30,500 kg); Fully loaded: 79,300 pounds (36,000 kg)
- Length: 35 ft 0 in (10.67 m)
- Width: 12 ft 0 in (3.66 m)
- Height: 10 ft 9 in (3.28 m) (turret roof); In water: 115 in (2.9 m)
- Crew: 3 crew
- Passengers: 17 fully equipped marines (EFVP); 7 command crew (EFVPC)
- Armor: armor panels made of ceramic, S-2 fiberglass, and a Kevlar-like woven fabric in three separate layers, armor offers protection against machine gun and artillery fragments weighs 20 pounds per square foot (960 Pa), 14.5 mm AP at 300 meters, 155/152 mm fragments at 15 meters
- Main armament: fully stabilized and digitally controlled Mk44 Bushmaster II Mod 0 30 mm cannon (EFVP); M240 machine gun, 7.62 mm coax (EFVPC)
- Engine: MTU Friedrichshafen MT 883 Ka-524 90-degree V-12 diesel engine 2,702 hp (2,015 kW) (water), 1,200 hp (890 kW) (transition) 850 hp (630 kW) (land)
- Power/weight: 34.48 hp/t (25.71 kW/t)
- Payload capacity: 9,150 pounds (4,150 kg)
- Transmission: Allison X4560 six speed transmission; water propulsion through two 23-inch (0.58 m)-diameter water jets
- Suspension: 14 retractable independent hydraulic suspension units with two nitrogen gas charges
- Fuel capacity: 325 US gallons (1,230 L)
- Operational range: land: 325 mi (523 km) water: 75 mi (120 km)
- Maximum speed: road: 45 mph (72 km/h) water: 28.6 mph (46.0 km/h; 24.9 kn) transition: 11 mph (18 km/h; 9.6 kn)

The Expeditionary Fighting Vehicle (EFV) (formerly known as the Advanced Amphibious Assault Vehicle (AAAV)) was an amphibious assault vehicle developed by General Dynamics during the 1990s and 2000s for use by the US Marine Corps. It would have been launched at sea, from an amphibious assault ship beyond the horizon, able to transport a full marine rifle squad to shore. It would maneuver cross country with an agility and mobility equal to or greater than the M1 Abrams.

The EFV was designed to replace the aging AAV-7A1 Assault Amphibious Vehicle (AAV), which entered service in 1972, and was the Marine Corps' number one priority ground weapon system acquisition. It was to have had three times the speed in water and about twice the armor of the AAV, as well as superior firepower. The vehicle was to be deployed in 2015; however, on 6 January 2011, Secretary of Defense Robert Gates recommended the EFV program be canceled. The program, which was projected to cost $15 billion, had already cost $3 billion.

The Marines asked for the EFV to be canceled in favor of the Assault Amphibian Vehicle Service Life Extension Program and the Marine Personnel Carrier, which itself became phase one of the Amphibious Combat Vehicle.

== History ==
In the 1980s, the US Marine Corps developed an "over the horizon" strategy for ocean-based assaults. The intention was to protect naval ships from enemy mines and shore defenses. It included the MV-22 Osprey, the Landing Craft Air Cushion (LCAC), and the EFV.

Development for the AAAV began in August 1974 with Landing Vehicle Assault (LVA) prototypes that continued in the early 1980s at the command at Marine Corps Base Camp Pendleton. The AAAV's predecessor, the LVTP-7, had its life expectancy extended in 1983–84 by use of a service life extension program, which modified and upgraded many of the key systems, creating the LVTP7A1 and re-designated it the AAVP7A1. At the time these vehicles were released, the USMC had anticipated and communicated delivery of the AAAV by 1993. As a result of delays, the AAVP7A1 received another service life extension-type upgrade in the mid 1990s while the USMC still awaited final development and delivery of the AAAV, 14 years behind original projected time frames.

In 1988, defense officials authorized the concept exploration and definition phase. In 1995, the program entered into the definition and risk reduction phase, where it won two Department of Defense awards for successful cost and technology management. In June 1996, a contract was awarded to General Dynamics Land Systems to begin full-scale engineering development of their design. Based on the early success of the program, the Marine Corps awarded a cost-plus contract to General Dynamics in July 2001 for the systems development and demonstration phase of the program, expected to be completed by October 2003. The AAAV was renamed "EFV" in September 2003. The Government Accountability Office later stated that the development phase of three years was insufficient, causing delays and prototype failures, particularly in reliability. After the 2006 operational assessment was plagued by reliability issues and maintenance burdens, the Corps began a redesign of the EFV, requiring a new contract for an additional US$143.5 million in February 2007. That June, a reset of the development phase delayed completion by an additional four years. Instead of initiating production as planned, the corps asked for seven new prototypes, to address the current deficiencies, which had caused an average of one failure for every four and a half hours of operation.

On 7 April 2009, Defense Secretary Gates said that the EFV program would "continue as-is", pending an amphibious review in the 2010 Quadrennial Defense Review. The vehicle was called "exquisite", which Gates usually reserved for programs he intended to cancel. He later questioned the EFV as the proper ship-to-shore platform on 3 May 2010, the day before the initial prototype was rolled out at a ceremony at Marine Corps Base Quantico.

The USMC had reduced the number to be purchased from 1,013 to 573 AAAVs by 2015 due to escalation in unit cost estimated at $22.3 million in 2007. The EFV might be a baseline vehicle for the US Army's BCT Ground Combat Vehicle Program, however it is more likely that the army will start a new program.

Low rate initial production (LRIP) was projected to begin in January 2012. Projected total program development cost of the type until first quarter of 2010 was estimated at 15.9 billion dollars.

=== Controversy ===
Robert O. Work, while Undersecretary of the Navy, sketched out a future for amphibious warfare in which either the Marines will land unopposed or it will take a major effort using all the long range weapons of the United States armed forces to clear out ship-killing missiles, so that amphibious ships can safely approach the hostile beach and neither scenario sees much use for the EFV. New families of guided anti-ship weapons have extended target ranges of well past 75 miles (121 km) making the EFV's capabilities less of a game-changer than originally hoped.

In a joint report, the US Public Interest Research Group and the National Taxpayers Union called the EFV program wasteful spending and asked for its cancellation along with the F-35 Joint Strike Fighter and the V-22 Osprey aircraft. The co-chairs of the National Commission on Fiscal Responsibility and Reform have also supported the cancellation of the EFV. During a Pentagon briefing, on 6 January 2011, revealing budget efficiencies and reinvestment possibilities, Secretary of Defense Gates announced his intention to cancel the EFV program. In a statement released after Gates' press conference, Commandant of the Marine Corps General Amos said that he supported the cancellation of the EFV:

Today the Secretary of Defense announced the termination of the Expeditionary Fighting Vehicle (EFV) program. I support his decision. After a thorough review of the program within the context of a broader Marine Corps force structure review, I personally recommended to both the Secretary of Defense and the Secretary of the Navy that the EFV be cancelled and that the Marine Corps pursue a more affordable amphibious tracked fighting vehicle.
Despite the critical amphibious and war-fighting capability the EFV represents, the program is not affordable given likely Marine Corps procurement budgets. The procurement and operations/maintenance costs of this vehicle are onerous. After examining multiple options to preserve the EFV, I concluded that none of the options meets what we consider reasonable affordability criteria. As a result, I decided to pursue a more affordable vehicle.

— James F. Amos, 35th Commandant of the Marine Corps

Loren B. Thompson, of the Lexington Institute, said that Amos had been ordered to give this statement, which did not reflect his actual feelings on the issue.

In an interview on 5 January 2011 with Bloomberg Businessweek, Duncan D. Hunter, a member of the House Armed Services Committee, anticipated the cancellation announcement by Gates. However, Hunter predicted that his committee would reject the cancellation.

According to Lieutenant General George J. Flynn of the Marine Corps Combat Development Command, the USMC was to use funding from the cancelled EFV for other tactical ground vehicles over the next five years. The EFV program was cut from a 2012 proposed budget by the White House.

General Dynamics offered a cut down version of the EFV without the hydroplaning or weapons. Ray Mabus has said that new defensive systems will allow navy ships to close to within 12 miles (19 km) off hostile shores so a 25-knot (46 km/h) amphibious tracked vehicle is no longer needed.

Deputy Commandant George Flynn has said that the analysis of alternatives to replace the EFV will be accelerated to complete in six to nine months. In the 2012 appropriations bill, Congress ordered that the EFV be one of the alternatives considered in the study.

== Design ==
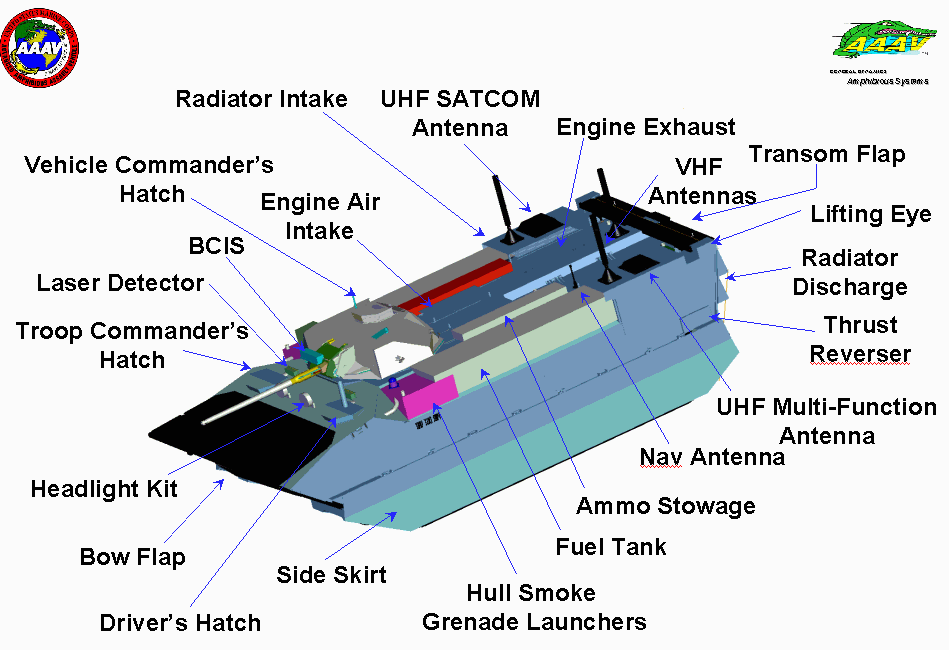
Diagram of EFVP1 variant

The EFV, designed by General Dynamics Land Systems, was an amphibious armored tracked vehicle with an aluminum hull. The engine is a custom MTU Friedrichshafen diesel (MT883) with three modes of operation; a high power mode for planing over the sea, a lower speed transition mode when approaching shallow water, and a low power mode for land travel. It has a crew of three and can transport 17 marines and their equipment. The EFV would have been the first heavy tactical vehicle with a space frame structure.

The hull had a hydraulically actuated bow flap to aid planing with a maximum waterborne speed of 25 knots (46 km/h). Shrouded Honeywell waterjet propulsors are integrated into each side of the hull, which create over 2,800 horsepower (2,100 kW) of power. It was also outfitted with hydraulically actuated chines to cover the tracks while in seafaring mode.

The vehicle uses an Ethernet network connected by the Tactical Switch Router, based on the COTS DuraMAR Mobile IP router for its internal and external communications.

=== Armament ===
The electrically powered two-man MK46 turret on the personnel variant accommodated the commander on the right and gunner on the left, a fire control system, and the main and coaxial weapons.

The standard version was to have had a Mk44 Bushmaster II 30 mm (1.18 in) cannon, which fired up to 200 rounds per minute with single, burst, and fully automatic capabilities up to 2,200 yards (2,000 m) in all weather conditions. A general purpose M240 7.62 mm (0.300 in) machine gun with 600 rounds of ready-to-use ammunition was to be mounted coaxially with the main gun.

=== Countermeasures ===
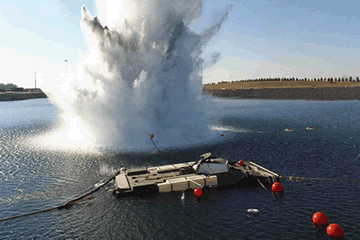
EFVP1 engineering prototype undergoing shock testing

The EFV was fitted with composite armor, mine-blast protection, and a nuclear, biological and chemical defense system. Although aluminum hulls have been used for decades in military ground vehicles and watercraft, they have caused some concern due to protection issues.

In June 2007 members of the House Armed Services Subcommittee on Seapower and Expeditionary Forces sent a letter to the Commandant of the Marine Corps urging that the EFV be redesigned to give troops better protection against roadside bombs. The Marines suggested that underbelly armor appliqué could be applied after the EFVs come ashore and before they encounter IEDs. The limited protection the EFV offers is an improvement on that offered by the AAV so the replacement is an advantage, given the current doctrine of using landing craft for land patrols.

However, tests in January and February 2010 at Aberdeen Test Center demonstrated that the EFV offers blast protection equal to a category-2 Mine Resistant Ambush Protected vehicle, including two simulated improvised explosive devices under its belly and tracks. Tests also show that it has superior protection from direct and indirect fire. The flat hull, which has endured persistent criticism for not being the more blast-resistant V-shape, was necessary for the EFV to plane across the surface of the water and reach its high speed, while dealing with sea states of Category 4.

On 13 October 2010 the navy awarded M Cubed Technologies a contract to develop new armor for the EFV to offer better protection and lighter weight.

=== Mobility ===
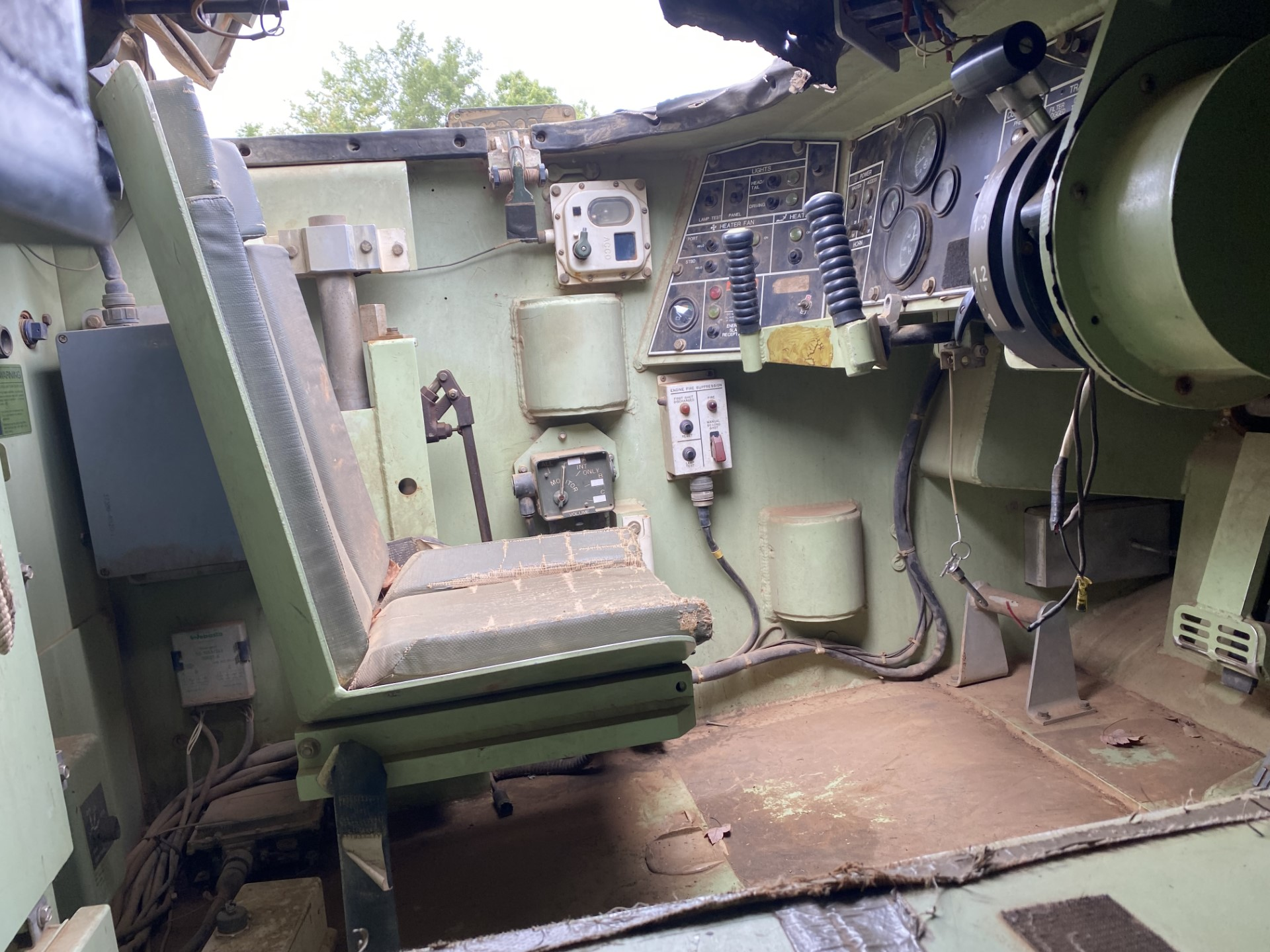
AAAV Automotive Test Rig (ATR) driver's compartment

Given the increasing ranges of shore launched anti-ship missiles, the EFV's 29-mile (46 km) range for amphibious landing may no longer provide the anticipated protection predicted for an over the horizon launch. The US Navy began reconsidering the over the horizon approach, and is considering 10 to 18 miles (16 to 29 km) appropriate for amphibious launches. This shift in doctrine has made the EFV's high water speeds unnecessary. The EFV's need for high water speed has resulted in an engine that is 1,200 hp (890 kW) more powerful than the M1 Abrams, even though the EFV weighs far less.

== Variants ==
=== Personnel variant ===
The EFVP1 with a three-man crew would have conducted the signature mission of the United States Marine Corps, expeditionary maneuver warfare from seabases by initiating amphibious operations from 20 to 25 miles (32 to 40 km) over-the-horizon and transporting 17 combat-equipped Marines to inland objectives. The fully armored, tracked combat vehicle would have provided firepower to disembarked or mechanized infantry with its own fully stabilized MK46 weapon station with the 30 mm cannon and 7.62 mm machine-gun.

=== Command variant ===
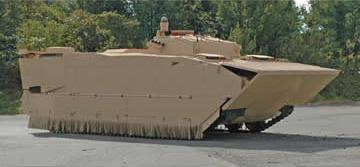
EFVC1

The EFVC1 was to have provided the same survival and mobility capabilities found in the EFVP1. The EFVC1 would have been employed as a tactical command post for maneuver unit commanders at the battalion and regimental level. The EFVC1 would have provided the supported commander and selected staff with the ability to communicate, via on-board communications, with senior, adjacent, and subordinate maneuver units. The EFVC1 was to be armed with only a 7.62 mm machine gun.

== See also ==
Related development

- Assault breacher vehicle
- Amphibious Combat Vehicle
- Armored Systems Modernization
- Marine Personnel Carrier
- Ground Combat Vehicle
- Stryker

Comparable ground systems

- Type 05 AFV – (China)
