= Marine Personnel Carrier =

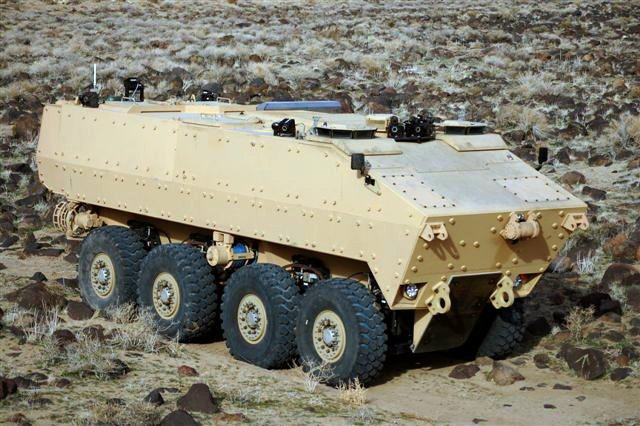
- Technology Demonstrator of the Marine Personnel Carrier
- Type: Wheeled armored personnel carrier
- Place of origin: United States

Production history
- Designer: U.S. Marines

Specifications
- Crew: 2
- Passengers: _{MPC-Personnel:8-9}

The Marine Personnel Carrier (MPC) is a wheeled armored personnel carrier under development for acquisition by the United States Marine Corps. The program was canceled in 2013 but resurrected in 2014 as part of phase one of the Amphibious Combat Vehicle.

== Role ==
The United States Marine Corps is preparing to acquire a new fleet of wheeled armored vehicles to meet the attributes and metrics of the Marine Personnel Carrier (MPC) requirement. The MPC will serve as a medium weight personnel carrier and complements the capabilities offered by the Joint Light Tactical Vehicle (JLTV – light weight personnel carrier category) and the Expeditionary Fighting Vehicle (EFV – heavy weight personnel carrier category). This triad of capabilities EFV – MPC – JLTV comprises the USMC ground mobility portfolio and the means by which expeditionary, scalable, and networked armored protected seats will be provided to the Marine Air-Ground Task Force in the future.

The Marine Personnel Carrier (MPC) will serve as a medium lift personnel carrier and complements the capabilities offered by the Joint Light Tactical Vehicle (JLTV) for light lift purposes and the Expeditionary Fighting Vehicle (EFV) for heavy lift purposes. The MPC will provide landward lift to infantry battalions. One infantry battalion can be lifted by one MPC company along with the infantry battalion's organic wheeled assets. Two MPC-Personnel Carriers can lift a reinforced Infantry squad. An Initial Capabilities Document (ICD) has already been approved and the Capability Development Document (CDD) is in development.

The MPC is a new capability that will be a multi-wheeled, armored personnel carrier designed to operate across the range of military operations but focused on an irregular warfare operating environment characterized by operations in constrained and urban terrain. Required to carry 8-9 combat loaded Marines and 2-man crew, the MPC will enable high-speed land maneuver as well as substantial ballistic protection to embarked Marines.

== Design ==
The MPC will possess a balance between the performance, protection and payload attributes and shall be designed to accomplish a broad array of missions across the range of military operations in a variety of operating environments in which expeditionary operations take place.

== Variants ==
The MPC family of vehicles will consist of a basic vehicle and two role-specific variants.

MPC-Personnel

The MPC-Personnel will be the basic vehicle, two of which carry and support a reinforced rifle squad of 17 marines. Each vehicle would carry 8–9 combat-equipped marines and a two-man crew. This meets the need to transport more marine infantrymen than the existing Light Armored Vehicle (LAV) or Humvee platforms while providing greater protection.

MPC-Command

The MPC-Command will be equipped to serve as a mobile command-echelon/ fire-support coordination center for the infantry battalion headquarters.

MPC-Recovery

The MPC-Recovery will be the maintenance and recovery variant of the MPC.

== Development ==
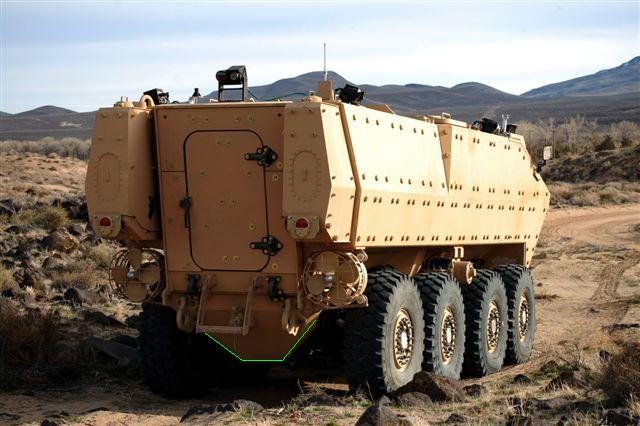
Rear hatch, with V-hull highlighted in green

The Marine Corps deferred Milestone A (MS A) for the Marine Personnel Carrier (MPC) program by two years to FY10. The two-year investment period allowed for the maturation of Government Furnished Equipment and armoring technologies the Marine Corps plans to integrate onto the vehicles once produced.

In addition, an MPC Technology Demonstrator vehicle effort will be initiated to inform CDD development on achievable capabilities and integration risks at the Nevada Automotive Test Center. This is the location that hosted the Combat Tactical Vehicle (CTV) test bed for the JLTV program. The MPC-Technology Demonstrator (MPC-TD) vehicle will address all major functional areas and specifically the following:

- Mobility (Powerpack, drivetrain, suspension system)
- Survivability (Weight affects mobility)
- Electrical power generation, management and distribution
- C4ISR
- Vehicle Health Monitoring

The initial Analysis of Alternatives (AoA) included "legacy" Stryker and the MPC AOA identified a medium armored personnel carrier as the solution to the MPC requirement. The MPC Program Office is pursuing jointness with the Army and including Stryker MOD in the revised MPC AoA. It is scheduled to begin Engineering, Manufacturing and Development in 2012, with initial operational capability in 2018. The acquisition objective is approximately 630 vehicles.

=== Competitors ===
IVECO Defence Vehicles teamed with BAE Systems Global Combat Systems to offer its Superav 8x8 amphibious armored personnel carrier.

In 2007, Lockheed Martin teamed up with Patria to offer the Patria AMV

In August 2012, the Marines awarded development contracts to four companies for their vehicles: the Lockheed Martin Havoc, the BAE Systems Superav, the SAIC Terrex, and an unspecified General Dynamics vehicle. Winners each received $3.5 million contracts for a demonstration and study vehicle for water performance evaluation, survivability testing, and an analysis of human factors and stowage capacity starting in fall 2012.

=== Testing ===
==== Amphibious tests ====
On 3 April 2013, the Lockheed Havoc successfully completed amphibious testing as part of its evaluation for the MPC program. Trials were conducted at Camp Pendleton with the vehicle loaded to its full combat weight. The Havoc demonstrated its resistance to water penetration and ability to negotiate all surf and wave conditions while accommodating a full complement of Marine Corps battle gear for the crew. It maintained 100 percent operational readiness throughout the test.

On 8 May 2013, BAE and Iveco successfully completed 12 days of evaluations on the Superav for the MPC program at Camp Pendleton. The evaluations included a water performance demonstrations in various sea conditions, as well as human factors and stowage capacity. The Superav exceeded all vehicle requirements, performing personnel exit drills in less than 17 seconds and showcasing advanced interior layout and compartmentalization that allowed for the stowage of more than three days of supplies without jeopardizing the survivability of the vehicle and personnel. Similar tests conducted by Iveco confirmed the vehicle's ability to be launched and recovered from ships and transition in surf zones. BAE and Iveco then prepared for survivability demonstrations in the summer.

On 6 June 2013, General Dynamics successfully completed water performance swim and human factors testing at Camp Pendleton. The General Dynamics MPC entry is based on their LAV III APC with a Double V-hull, making it the first vehicle with the hull design to have swim capabilities. The General Dynamics MPC demonstrated swim capabilities at its fully armored combat weight, along with the required ability to carry 12 Marines and their equipment. Rapid tactical and emergency egress through the vehicle’s large roof hatches and rear ramp was also demonstrated. The vehicle was buoyant at its full combat weight, which included two days of supplies to support 12 marines. It also maneuvered safely through varying sea levels up to four feet deep and reached water speeds of over six knots.

On 18 July 2013, SAIC, along with ST Kinetics and Armatec Survivability Corporation, successfully completed two weeks of evaluations for the Terrex at Camp Pendleton. The tests included a series of water performance demonstrations in various sea conditions and an evaluation of human factors and stowage capacity. The Terrex completed all required surf transit and ocean swim maneuverability tests at its fully loaded combat weight. It demonstrated load capabilities through successful stowage of gear and supplies that Marines would require for three days of operations, with space available for additional equipment. The human factors evaluation demonstrated the spacious interior by accommodating the specified number of combat-equipped Marines and enabling rapid tactical and emergency egress through a quick-release hatch. The Terrex repeated ocean swim and maneuverability results achieved in a March 2013 rehearsal event. SAIC began ballistic and blast tests at the Nevada Automotive Test Center in May 2013, and was scheduled to complete all ballistic and mine blast demonstrations in July. The Marines are to deliver a final report in September 2013.

==== Survivability tests ====
During the summer of 2013, the Havoc successfully completed protection systems testing during a series of blast tests. The vehicle completed all threshold and objective protection system testing, with instrumentation indicating that no disabling injuries would have resulted to any of the three crew members and nine dismounted Marines. Lockheed also delivered a report demonstrating the high degree of commonality between the Havoc and other Marine Corps vehicles, aimed at reducing cost, training requirements, and logistics needs.

=== Deferment ===
In June 2013, days after General Dynamics completed water performance swim and human factors testing, the Marine Corps officially put the MPC program on hold. The program was delayed by budget cuts and prioritization of the Amphibious Combat Vehicle by the Marines. Although the MPC's primary role is to carry troops once ashore, it is amphibious like the ACV, and Congress has expressed concerns about funding two vehicle programs to fulfill the role. Marine officials promised to maintain contact with interested vehicle manufacturers so that if the decision was made to restart the MPC program, it could be done in an expeditious and cost-efficient manner. Procurement of the planned 579 MPC vehicles was on "indefinite hold," and it could have been 10 years before development was restarted. It would have taken several years for the vehicle to be designed, built, and fielded. Given technological advancements as well as emerging threat weapons systems and the constantly changing geo-strategic environment, the MPC developmental requirements may not have been valid or relevant over the next five to ten years.

=== ACV Increment 1.1 ===
Shortly after the Marine Corps submitted their FY 2015 budget request in February 2014, General Jim Amos decided to postpone development of the Amphibious Combat Vehicle program and return funding to the Marine Personnel Carrier. Originally, the Marines planned to buy both the ACV and MPC to replace outdated vehicles to complement each other for different missions. During an amphibious assault, a limited number of ACVs would carry the initial landing force from ship to shore and further inland. After the beach was secured, a larger number of MPCs would be landed by landing craft to reinforce the first wave. When budgets tightened, the ACV was taken as the priority and funding was removed from the MPC, with the service figuring they could buy an off-the-shelf wheeled troop transport later when money was available. Technical challenges to the proposed ACV continued to mount as funds kept getting constrained, so the decision was made that wheeled APC advancements were significant enough to address needs quicker. Marines still want a high-speed fully amphibious vehicle to move troops from the ocean to a beach with enough armor, mobility, and firepower to fight while on land, so a phased approach was decided for the ACV. Phase 1 would be the procurement of an interim vehicle to replace the aging Amphibious Assault Vehicle, while Phase 2 would develop desired capabilities for the platform. There was some suggestion of incorporating the MPC into ACV Phase 1, and combining it with a high-speed watercraft that can bring it to the landing area, or close enough that it can use its own limited amphibious capabilities. If the MPC had funding restored in 2015, time spent on holding a competition and evaluations would lead to operational quantities being available around 2020.

ACV Phase I is a restructured version of the MPC, which will be the procurement of a modified U.S. or foreign wheeled armored troop transport. 200 basic transports will be bought as part of ACV 1.1, following which ACV 1.2 will buy an additional 400 vehicles in other variants including command and fire support. Phase I ACV submissions are likely to include the previous contenders for the MPC program. The vehicle will need a higher swim capability standard than the MPC, with the ability to move 5 mi (8.0 km) to shore from water after being dropped off by a connector. It will travel that distance in one hour, roughly the same time and distance the AAV deploys and travels at.

== See also ==
- Assault breacher vehicle
- Amphibious Combat Vehicle
- M1128 mobile gun system
- Stryker
- Ground Combat Vehicle, U.S. Army infantry fighting vehicle program canceled in 2014
- Expeditionary Fighting Vehicle a heavier tracked infantry fighting vehicle that was being developed for the U.S. Marine Corps but has been cancelled
- Future Combat Systems
- Future Combat Systems manned ground vehicles, a canceled American family of tracked vehicles
- Stryker, a recent American family of wheeled vehicles
- Joint Light Tactical Vehicle, a future American family of light vehicles
- Combat Vehicle Reconnaissance (Tracked), an earlier but similar British family of vehicles
- Combat Vehicle Reconnaissance (Wheeled), an earlier but similar British family of vehicles
