= V-hull =

Vehicle armor design

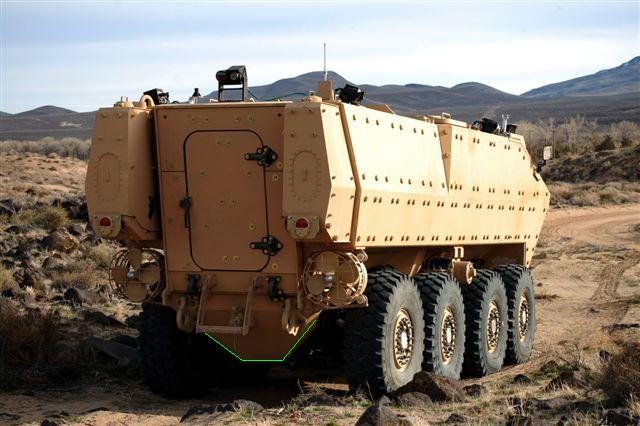
The V-hull on the Marine Personnel Carrier (highlighted in green) protects well against IEDs, but raises the center of mass, increasing the likelihood of rollovers.

The V-hull is a type of vehicle armor design used on wheeled armored personnel carriers (APCs), infantry mobility vehicles, infantry fighting vehicles (IFVs) and MRAPs. The design originated in the 1970s with vehicles such as the Casspir used extensively during the South African Border War, Leopard security vehicle used in the Rhodesian Bush War and South African armored vehicle company Land Systems OMCs and Buffels.

== Design ==
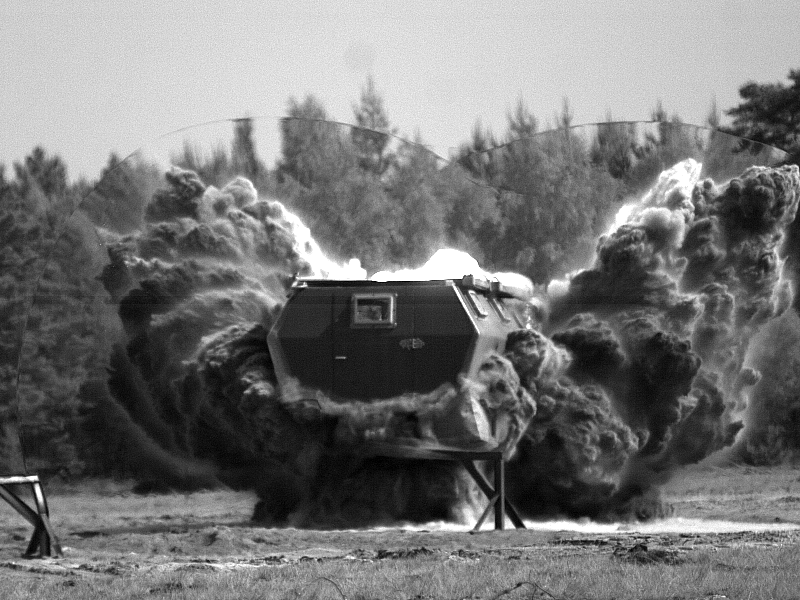
Field test of a V-hull vehicle

The purpose of V-hulls is to increase vehicle and crew survivability by deflecting an upward directed blast from a landmine (or Improvised Explosive Device) away from the vehicle, while also presenting a sloped armor face. By presenting its armor at an angle, it increases the amount of material a ballistic projectile must pass through in order to penetrate the vehicle, and increases the chance of deflection.

V-hulls are incorporated in armored vehicle designs in several different ways. Many vehicles, such as the BAE Systems RG-33 incorporate the V-hull into a monocoque chassis, while others, such as the ATF Dingo and International MaxxPro use a body-on-frame chassis, with an armored V-hull crew compartment, and an additional V or semicircular shaped piece protecting the driveline. Others, such as the Cougar H have a V-hull crew compartment, and allow the driveline and suspension components to be sacrificed in an attack, while maintaining the safety of the crew.

== Gallery ==
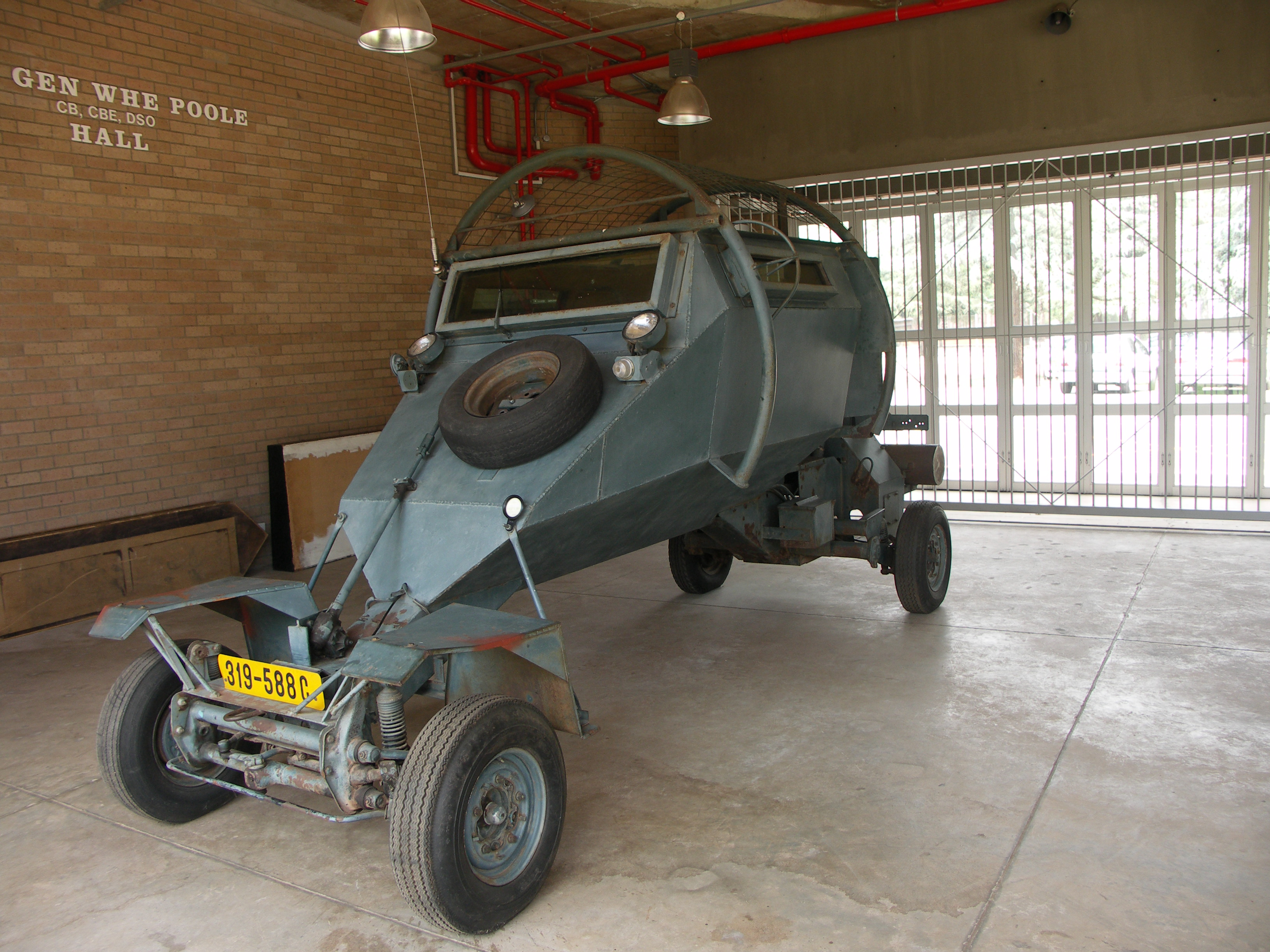
The Rhodesian Leopard security vehicle, one of the first V-hull vehicles.

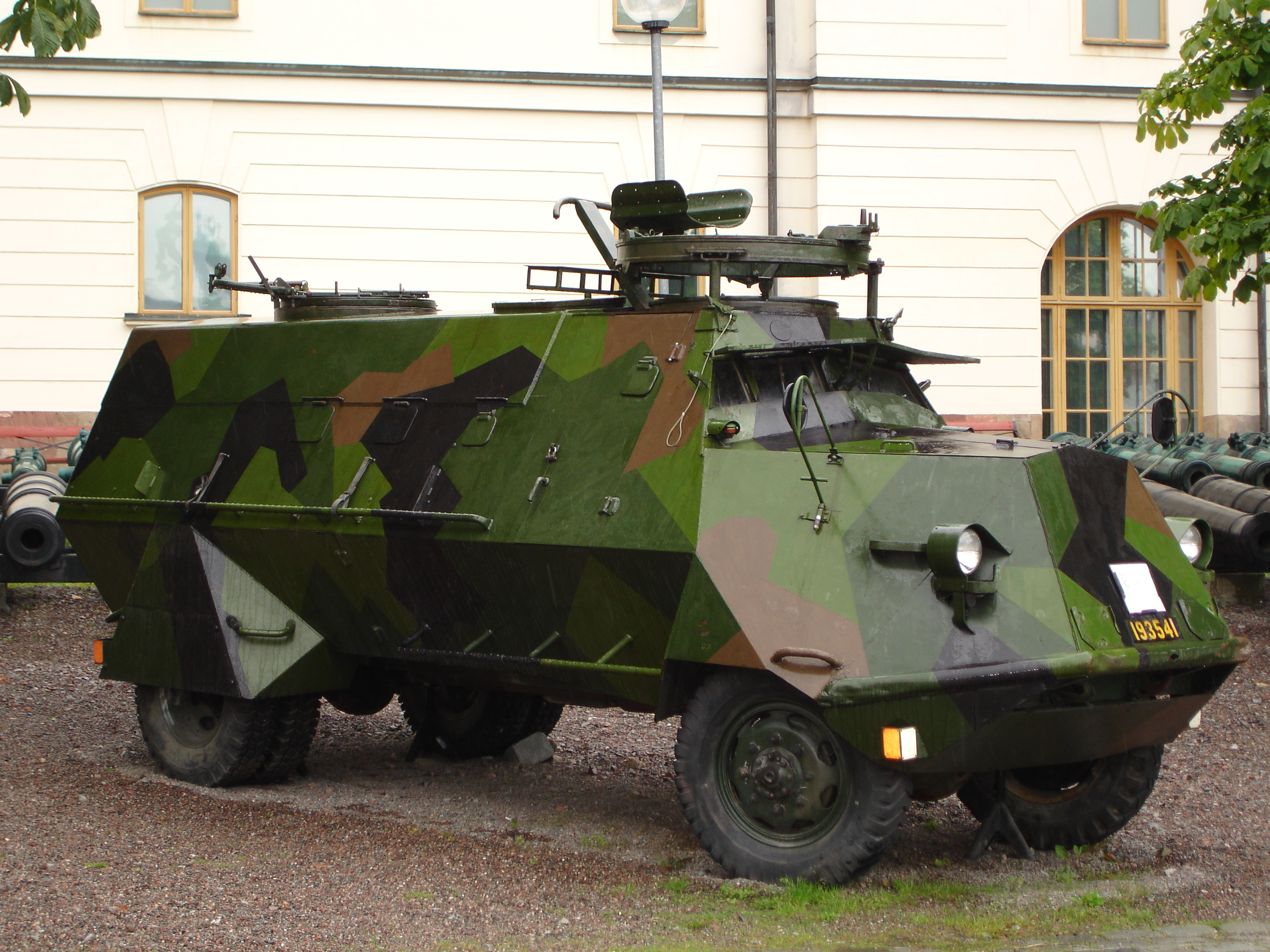
Terrängbil m/42 KP early V-hull vehicle and the first APC in the Swedish armed forces, in use 1942–1990. It saw combat during the Congo crisis.

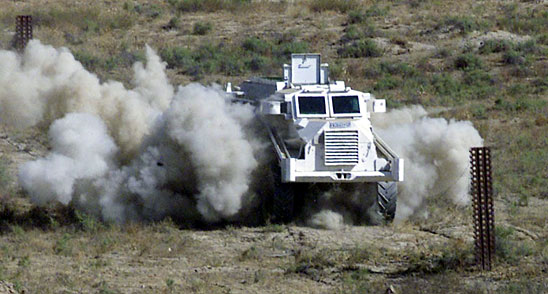
A Casspir de-mining vehicle in the vicinity of the Bagram Airfield in Afghanistan.

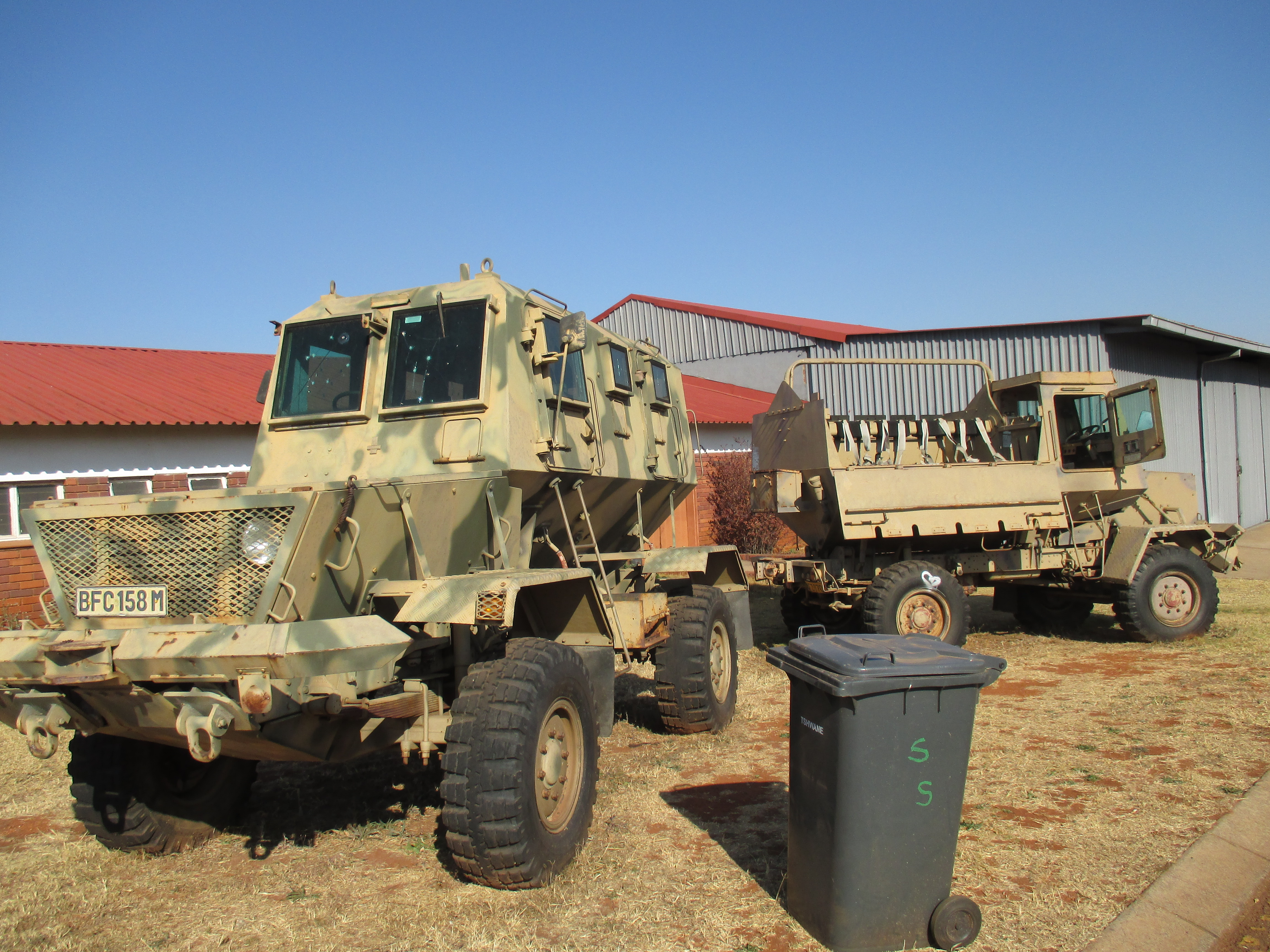
Buffel variants at Air Force Base Swartkop, South Africa.

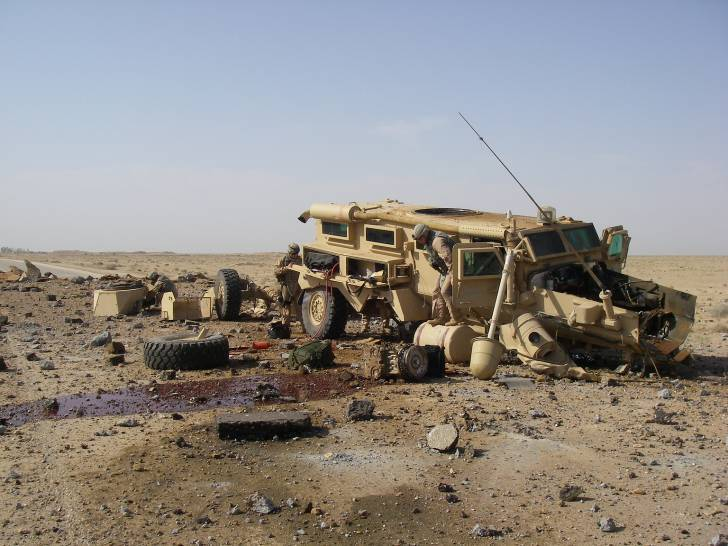
Force Protection's Cougar hit by an Improvised explosive device (IED) in Iraq; all crew survived.

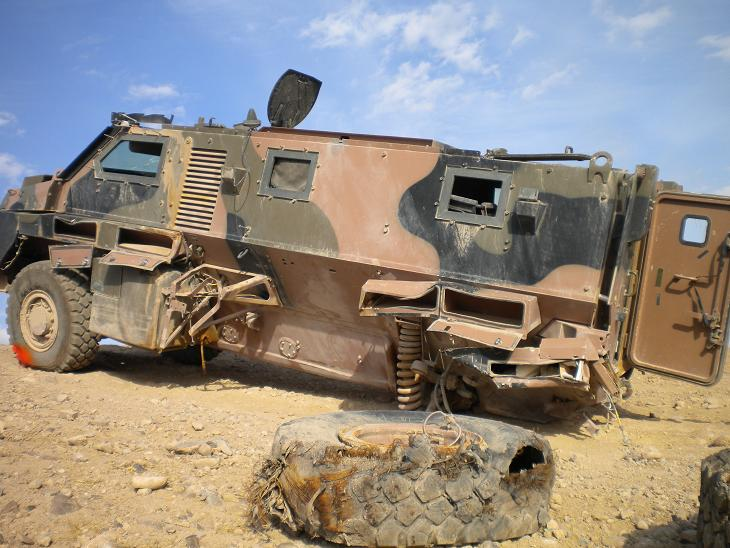
A Bushmaster IMV after encountering an IED; the drive train and utility bins were destroyed, but the hull is intact and the crew survived with only minor injuries.

== See also ==
- MRAP
