= Cardom =

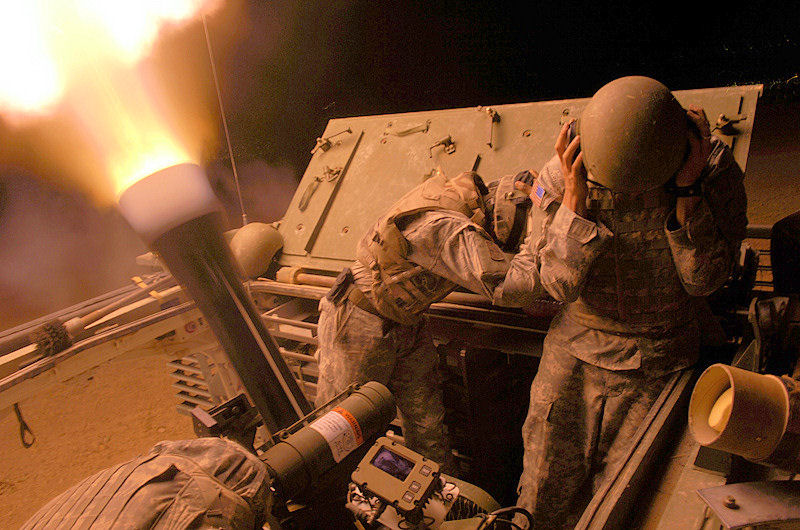
- Cardom 120 mm recoil mortar system
- Type: Recoil mortar system
- Place of origin: Israel

Service history
- In service: 2003-present
- Used by: US army, IDF, NATO forces and more
- Wars: List of Conflicts: War in Afghanistan (2001–2021); Iraq War; Syrian civil war; 2020 Nagorno-Karabakh conflict

Production history
- Manufacturer: Soltam Systems

Specifications
- Caliber: 81 mm or 120 mm
- Rate of fire: 16 rounds per min, 4 rpm sustained

The Cardom (English: Hatchet, stands for Computerized Autonomous Recoil Rapid Deployed Outrange Mortar) is an Israeli 81 mm/120 mm recoil mortar system (RMS), manufactured by Soltam Systems. It is used by the United States Army, the Israel Defence Forces (IDF), NATO countries, and others. The Cardom is an autonomous, computerized system for mounting on light and medium armored carriers. The system provides accurate and effective fire support.

== Overview ==
The system uses a new computerized integrated navigation and self-positioning and aiming systems. Its modern target acquisition devices, together with a specially designed recoiling mortar system, attenuate the firing loads and enables mounting the systems on wheeled and tracked armoured fighting vehicles, or even soft-skinned vehicles such as trucks. The system's aiming mechanisms are linked to state-of-the-art command, control and communication systems, to achieve quick response automatic laying mode. The Cardom system takes target-acquisition data including range, bearing and position from an observation point and transmits it directly to the Cardom system. Using electrical servo motors, the mortar barrel is then set at the exact traverse and elevation angles to fire upon the target. The 120 mm Cardom has a burst rate of 16 rpm, followed by a 4 rpm sustained rate of fire.

== Foreign Use ==
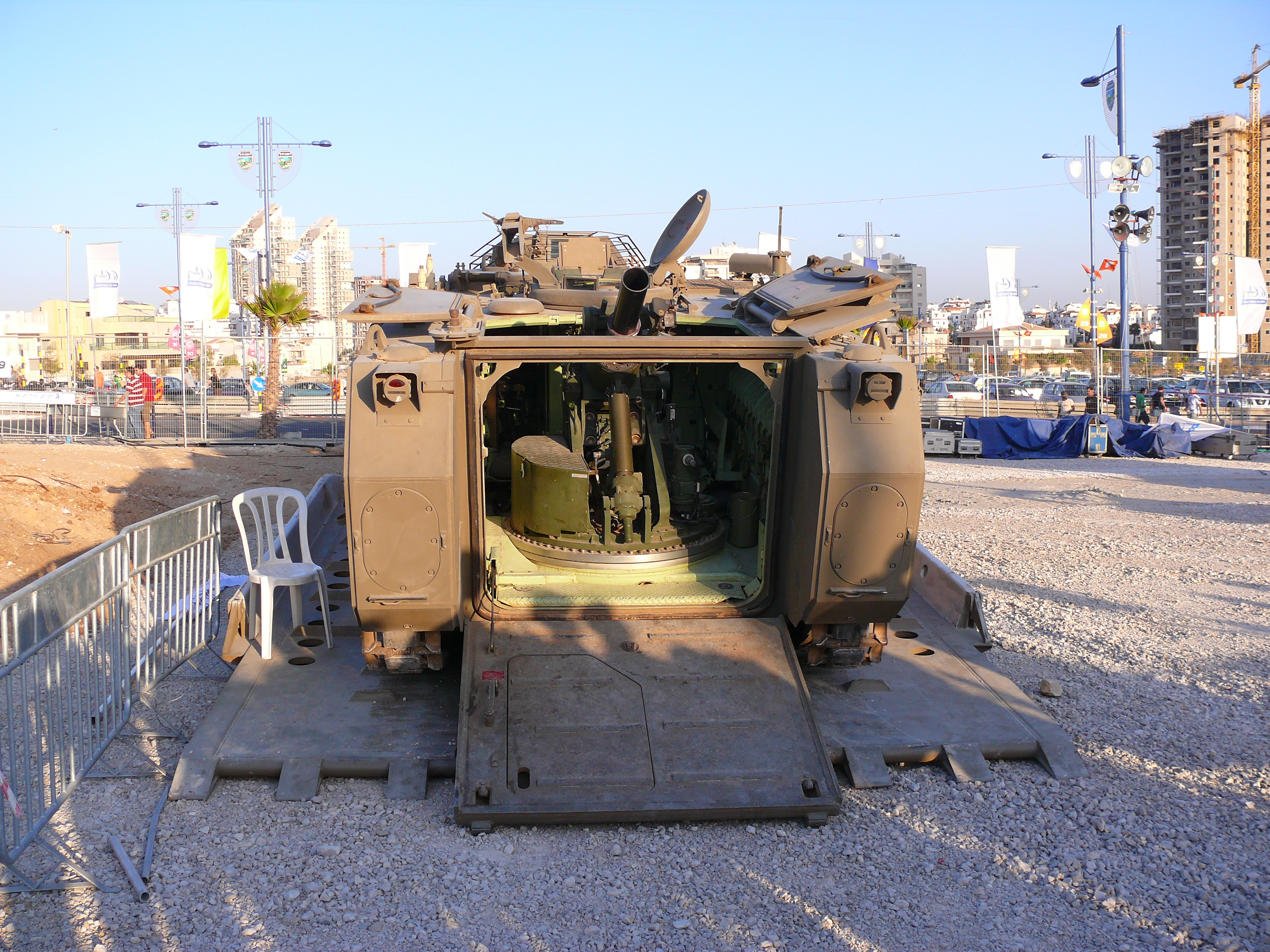
IDF "Keshet" 120mm mortar

The Cardom recoil mortar system has been qualified for fielding with the 3rd US Army Stryker brigade, and will be coupled with the M95 mortar's fire control system on the M1129 mortar carrier. So far, over 320 mortar systems have been manufactured for the U.S. Army.

== Performance ==
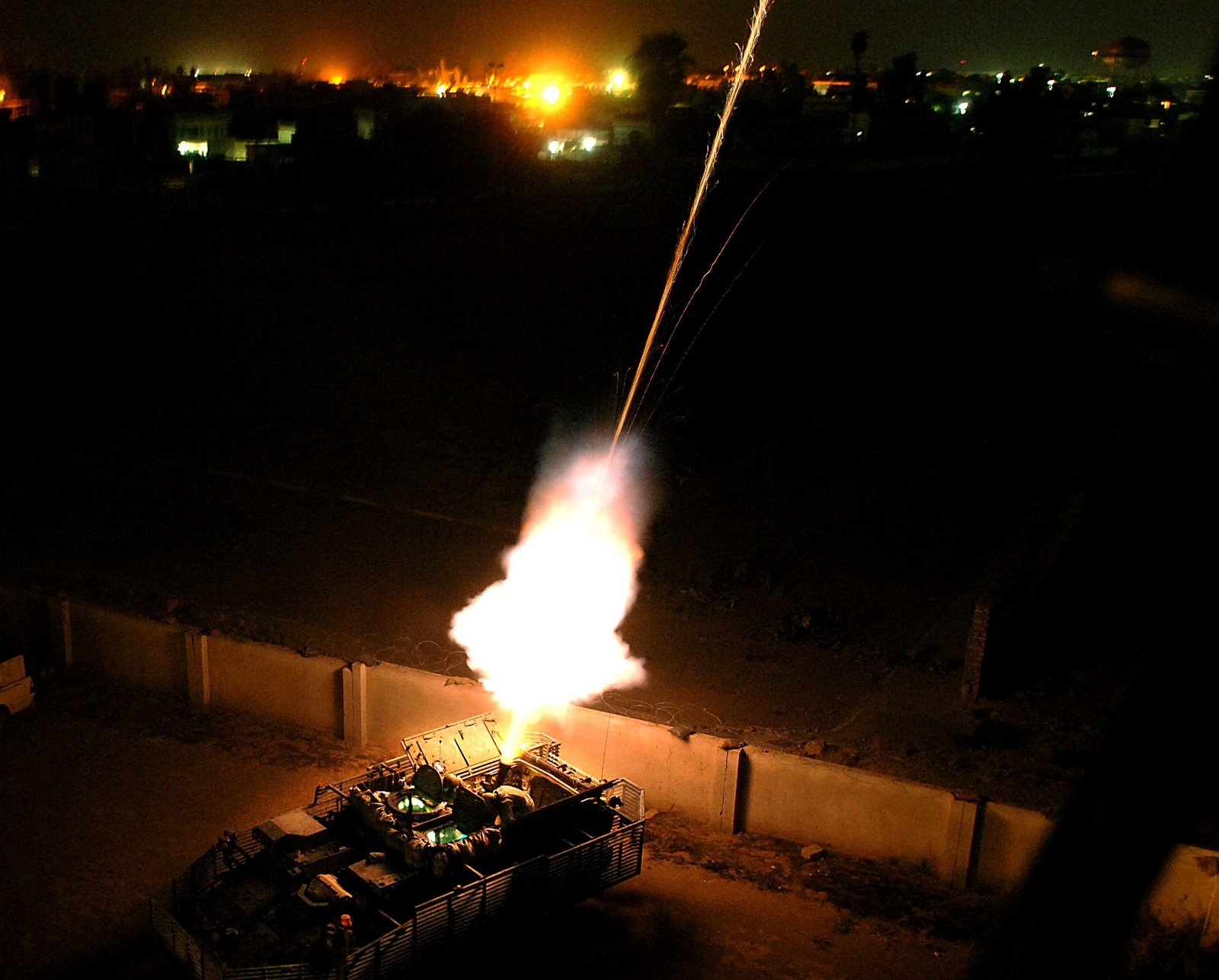
Cardom on a US M1129 mortar carrier in operation in Iraq

- Range: 7,000-8,000 meters
- Calibre: 120/81mm smoothbore and rifled
- Max rate of fire: 16 rounds per minute
- Traverse (deg): 360
- Shoot of first round: less than 30 sec
- Crew: 2-4 dependent on carrier
- Dual mode: mounted and dismounted

== Operators ==
120 mm Cardom 10 recoil mortar system fired from Piranha V of the Royal Danish Army

Azerbaijan

- Azerbaijani Land Forces

Bahrain

- Royal Bahraini Army special forces (purchased to Spain, fitted on the URO VAMTAC)

Chile

- Chilean Army

Cameroon

- Cameroon Army

Denmark

- Royal Danish Army (also known as M/10 or Cardom 10)

Israel

- Israeli Army

Kazakhstan

- Armed Forces of the Republic of Kazakhstan

Portugal

- Portuguese Army

Philippines

- Philippine Army

Spain

- Spanish Army

Thailand

- Royal Thai Army

Uganda

- Uganda Army

United States

- United States Army

Zambia

- Zambian Army

== See also ==
- M1129 mortar carrier
- AMOS – (Finland)
- Patria NEMO – (Finland)
- Soltam 120 mm mortar system – (Israel)
- Soltam 155 mm mobile howitzer – (Israel)
- Light-weight combat vehicle – (Japan)
