= LCV =

LCV can stand for:

== Organizations ==
- League of Conservation Voters

== Vehicles and transport ==
- Airport code of Lucca, Italy
- Low-carbon vehicle, used in the context of the Low Carbon Vehicle Event
- Landing craft, vehicle
- Landing Craft Vehicle Personnel
- Light commercial vehicle
- Amtrak station code of Lincolnville, Maine, United States
- Long combination vehicle
- Light-weight combat vehicle, a wheeled self-propelled artillery system of the Japan Ground Self-Defense Force

== Science and technology ==
- Legionella containing vacuole
- Leuco Crystal Violet, or Crystal Violet Leuco dye
- Lower Calorific Value, synonymous to Lower Heating Value

== Business ==
- Customer lifetime value, in marketing, a prediction of the net profit attributed to the entire future relationship with a customer. Same as customer lifetime value (CLV) or user lifetime value (ULV).
