= M120 =

M120 or M-120 may refer to:

- M120 mortar, a mortar in United States Army infantry and armor units
- M120 Rak, Polish self-propelled gun
- M-120 (Michigan highway), a state highway in Michigan
- Mercedes-Benz M120 engine, a V12 automobile piston engine
- M120 (Cape Town), a Metropolitan Route in Cape Town, South Africa
