= X18 =

X18 may refer to:

- X18 (New York City bus)
- Antasena-class combat boat
- Hiller X-18, an American experimental aircraft
- Onomichi Station, in Hiroshima Prefecture, Japan
