= Antasena-class combat boat =

Combat boat

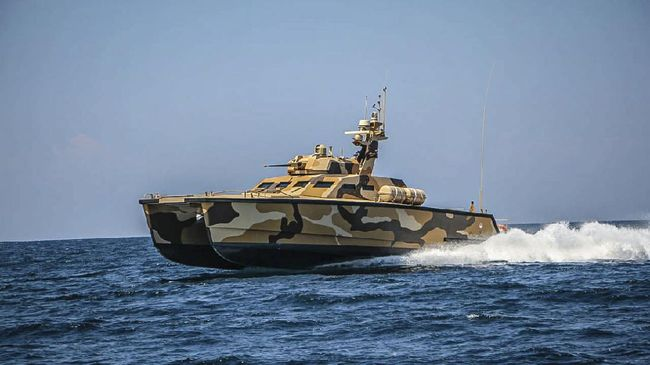
- X18 combat boat APC 30 version

Class overview
- Builders: North Sea Boats
- Cost: €10 million–€15 million (November 2016) or US$12.25 million–US$19.23 million (January 2021)
- In commission: 2021–present
- Completed: 1

General characteristics
- Type: Catamaran-type combat boat
- Displacement: 43 tons
- Length: 18.75 m (61.5 ft) overall
- Beam: 7.5 m (24 ft 7 in)
- Draught: 0.9 m (2 ft 11 in)
- Ramps: 1 × Forward landing ramp
- Propulsion: 2 × MTU V12 2000M86 1700 hp engine; 2 × MJP550 waterjet
- Speed: 50 knots (93 km/h) maximum, 40 knots (74 km/h) cruise speed
- Range: 600 nmi (1,110 km) at 9 knots (17 km/h)
- Boats & landing craft carried: 1 × RHIB (optional), 1 × Jet Ski (optional)
- Troops: 20–60 special forces or marines
- Crew: 5–6 person
- Armament: Cockerill 3000 series turret; 1 × high-pressure low recoil-force 105 mm gun; 1 × 30 mm cannon; Cockerill Falarick 105 Gun Launched Anti-Tank Guided Missile (GLATGM); Lemur RWS mounting 12.7 mm HMG to 30 mm autocannon on top of the turret; 2 × 12.7 mm heavy machine gun
- Armour: NATO Stanag 4569 Ballistic armor/armor plating covering the whole outside part of bridge/control room.
- Aircraft carried: 1 × North Sea Drones 6Y six-rotor VTOL drone (optional)
- Notes: References

Antasena-class combat boat is a combat boat built by North Sea Boats and designed by LOMOcean Marine for the Indonesian armed forces. The manufacturer designated it as Combat Boat X-18 / CB X-18. Initially, this class of ships was developed from a tank boat program from a consortium consisting of PT Lundin (North Sea Boats), Pindad, PT LEN, and PT Hariff Daya Tunggal Engineering, with John Cockerill as the turret supplier.

== History and development ==
Lundin first announced the tank boat concept in 2014. This concept was launched after the company succeeded in building a stealth warship called KRI Klewang. This tank boat made in Indonesia is claimed to be one of the first tank boat in the world.

In the 2015 Armored Vehicle Asia Conference, the President Director of Lundin, John Lundin, said that this boat is a "combination of boat and tank" that can be used for amphibious operations in the sea and rivers. In the Defense & Security 2015 exhibition which took place from 2–5 November 2015 in Bangkok, Thailand, Lundin again promoted the concept of this tank boat. A full-scale imitation of the X18 tank boat is shown at the 2016 Indo Defense military exhibition.

The tank boat was first unveiled in Indo Defence 2016 in the form of full size mockup. The mockup was equipped with Cockerill 3105 turret. The design used catamaran type hull with shallow draught, suitable for maneuvering in shallow areas such as swamps, mangroves and rivers. The tank boat was formally named by vice president Jusuf Kalla as "Antasena". The name comes from a wayang character who has the ability to fight on water and immune to all types of weapons. Antasena is a Javanese wayang character, the youngest son of Bimasena and another relative of the mother of Antareja and Gatotkaca. In 2018, the Ministry of Defense ordered one X18 tank boat to add to the TNI AD facilities as well as evaluate the boat's performance.

On March 11, 2020, Pindad signed a consortium contract in a tank boat development project. In the consortium, Pindad acts as the lead integrator responsible for providing weapon systems and monitoring specifications according to user requirements. In addition, the consortium is also joined by Len Industry as a communication system provider, Hariff Daya Tunggal Engineering who is responsible for the Battlefield Management System (BMS), and Lundin Industry Invest as the ship platform provider. The Ministry of Defense stated that the investment in the development of X18 will cost 10.9 million Euros or around IDR 184 billion in an exchange rate of IDR 16,800.

The first prototype had begun sea trials on April 28, 2021. Then on May 22, 2021, the X18 Antasena tank boat ordered by the Ministry of Defense underwent a sea trial from the dock in Banyuwangi to the waters of Paiton, Probolinggo. After arriving at the Indonesian Navy's firing range in Paiton, the tank boat underwent a firing test using its main weapon, the 30 mm cannon. The X18 tank boat then returned to Banyuwangi. The total distance covered by the X18 Antasena in this trial was 170 nautical miles (310 km). This trial was also witnessed by the Director General of Pothan of the Ministry of Defense, Maj. Gen. Dadang Hendra Yudha, Dirtekindhan of the Directorate General of Pothan, Laksma TNI Sri Yanto, and company directors who are members of the X18 boat development project consortium. It is not certain when this boat will be handed over to the Indonesian Army. However, the handover is likely to take place in September 2021.

Apart from Indonesia, X18 has garnered some interest from Egypt, India, Greece, the Philippines, Russia and the United Arab Emirates.

== Technical details ==
The X18 uses a two-hull design with a composite material that is claimed to be ten times stronger than steel, but ten times lighter than the same material. This makes the X18 able to perform agile maneuvers and save fuel. The President Director of PT Lundin, John Lundin, also revealed that the material problem that occurred in the X18 predecessor, KRI Klewang, had been resolved so that the material used by X18 was fire resistant.

The X18 tank boat uses the main engine in the form of two MTU V12 2000M86 diesel engines with a power of 1700 horsepower. The X18 is also equipped with the MJP 550 Waterjet propulsor. With a fuel tank capacity of around 6000 liters, the X18 is able to reach destination as far as 600 nautical miles (1,100 km) without refueling.

The main armament of the X18 boats relies on the Cockerill 3030 turret supplied from Belgium's Cockerill Maintenance & Ingenierie SA Defense in collaboration with Pindad. This gun dome uses aluminum and is able to position the weapon with an elevation of -10 degrees to 60 degrees. The main weapon system can be used during the day and night and is capable of firing the Cockerill Falarick 105 Gun Launched Anti-Tank Guided Missile (GLATGM) towards targets as far as 5000 meters away. The X18 is also equipped with the RWS Lemur secondary armament.

Unlike the 2016 mockup, the first prototype is APC 30 variant. It is equipped with Cockerill 3030 unmanned turret (mounting 30 mm autocannon) and two 12.7 mm machine guns. This boat will be able to carry up to 60 troops, 5 tons of cargo, and is manned by a crew of 5. A drone is integrated with the boat for surveillance and reconnaissance task. The boat is intended for use by Indonesian army. The integrated drone is North Sea Drones 6Y (NSD-6Y) which could loiter for 40 minutes with a line-of-sight range of 10 km. It can fly up to 90 km/h with 1.5 kg payload. The drone is optional, it is not included in the Antasena program.

The X18 uses a communication system supplied by Len Industry. The system includes LenHDR100-V radio, high frequency radio (HF) for long-distance voice communication with other combat vehicles, and LenMDR50-V radio, V/UHF radio for tactical data communication with other combat vehicles. The X18 is also equipped with a LenCavysys intercom for internal communication between crew and passengers.

The X18 navigation system uses one radar station, two GPS devices, an AIS device, and other devices. VHF and SBB radios are used in ship communication systems.

== Variants ==
The Antasena-class combat boat is offered in 3 variants:

- Tank boat caliber 105 mm (manufacturer designation: X18 tank boat), the original "tank boat" program, mounting 105 mm cannon. Carried 20 troops with 6 crew. Mockup only.
- APC 30 (manufacturer designation: X18 ATC), mounting 30 mm autocannon and could carry 60 troops with 5 crew. Currently under sea trial.
- Missile version, carrying anti-ship missiles. Not yet developed.

== Operators ==
=== Current operators ===
- Indonesia: Indonesian Navy.

=== Potential operators ===
- Russia: The order was confirmed by the Indonesian Ambassador to Russia, Wahid Supriyadi.
- United Arab Emirates: Signed MOU with Indonesia.
- Poland: Expressed interest.
- India: Expressed interest.
- Greece: Expressed interest.
- Philippines: Expressed interest.
- Egypt: Expressed interest.

== See also ==
- Patria NEMO mortar boat, armed with single-barelled Patria NEMO 120 mm mortar
- Combat Boat 2010, armed with twin 120 mortar in AMOS turret
