= Patria 6×6 =

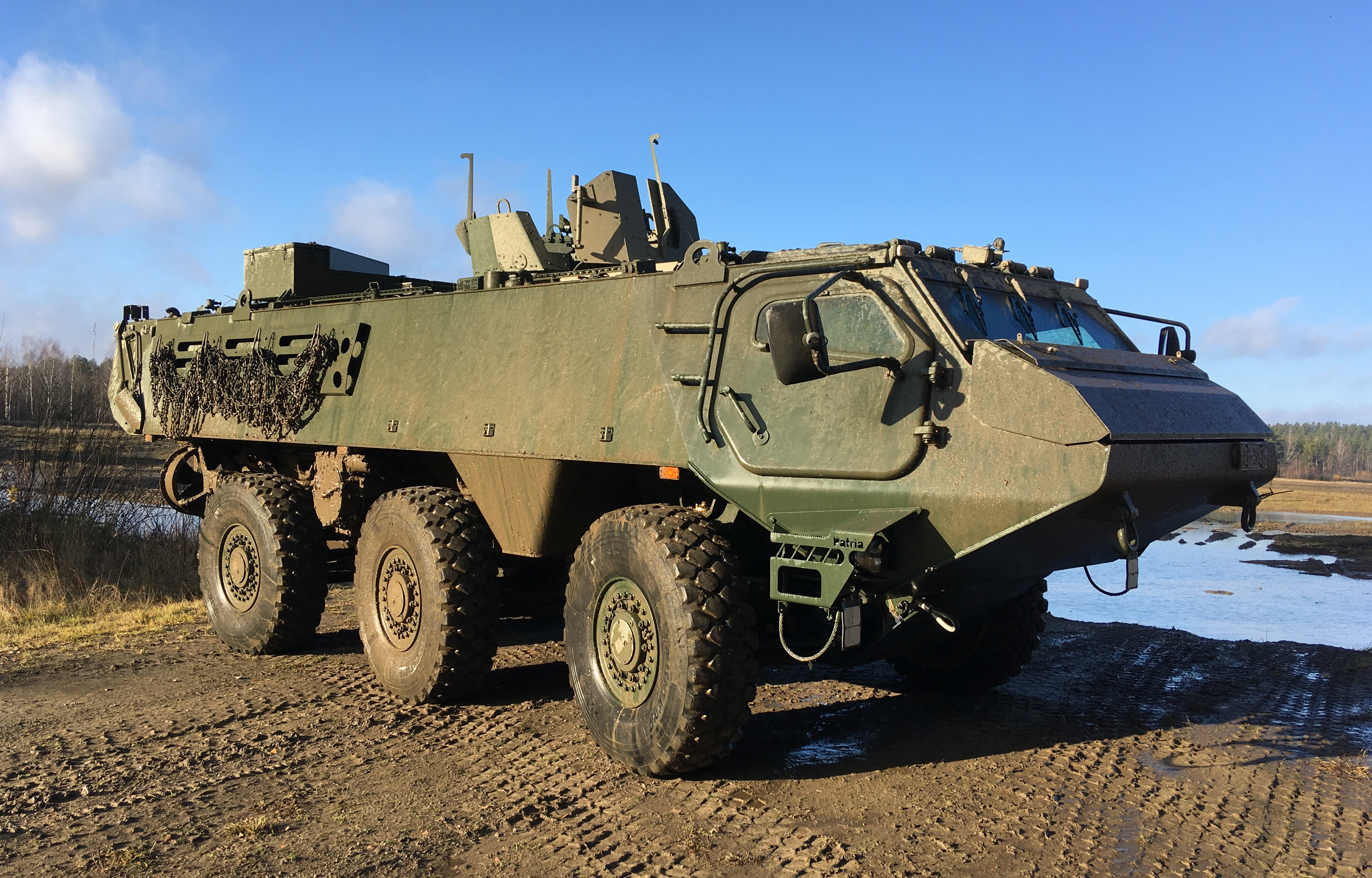
- Type: Armoured personnel carrier
- Place of origin: Finland

Service history
- In service: 2021–present
- Used by: See Operators below
- Wars: Russo-Ukrainian War

Production history
- Designer: Patria
- Manufacturer: Patria Under licence: In Latvia at Valmiera; In Germany by Patria, DSL (part of KNDS Deutschland) and FFG
- No. built: 300 (as of February 2026)

Specifications
- Mass: Empty: 15.5 t (34,000 lb); Maximum for amphibious operations: 21.5 t (47,000 lb); Maximum with coil springs suspensions: 22.0 t (48,500 lb); Maximum with hydropneumatic suspensions: 24.0 t (52,900 lb)
- Length: 7.5 m (25 ft)
- Width: 2.9 m (9 ft 6 in)
- Height: 2.5 m (8 ft 2 in)
- Crew: 2–3 (commander, driver, optional gunner); 8–10 passengers
- Armor: STANAG 4569 level K2, M2a/b (Optional level K4, M4a/b)
- Engine: DC 09 Scania AB, an in-line 5 diesel engine 294 kW (394 hp); 1,870 N⋅m (1,380 lbf⋅ft)
- Power/weight: 18.3 to 12.25 kW/t (24.88 to 16.66 PS/t)
- Payload capacity: 8.5 t (19,000 lb)
- Drive: 6×6 wheeled
- Transmission: ZF Friedrichshafen, 7 gears forward, 2 gears backwards
- Suspension: independent coil springs (optional hydropneumatic suspension)
- Operational range: 700 km (430 mi)
- Maximum speed: over 100 km/h (60 mph) on land up to 8 km/h (5.0 mph) in water

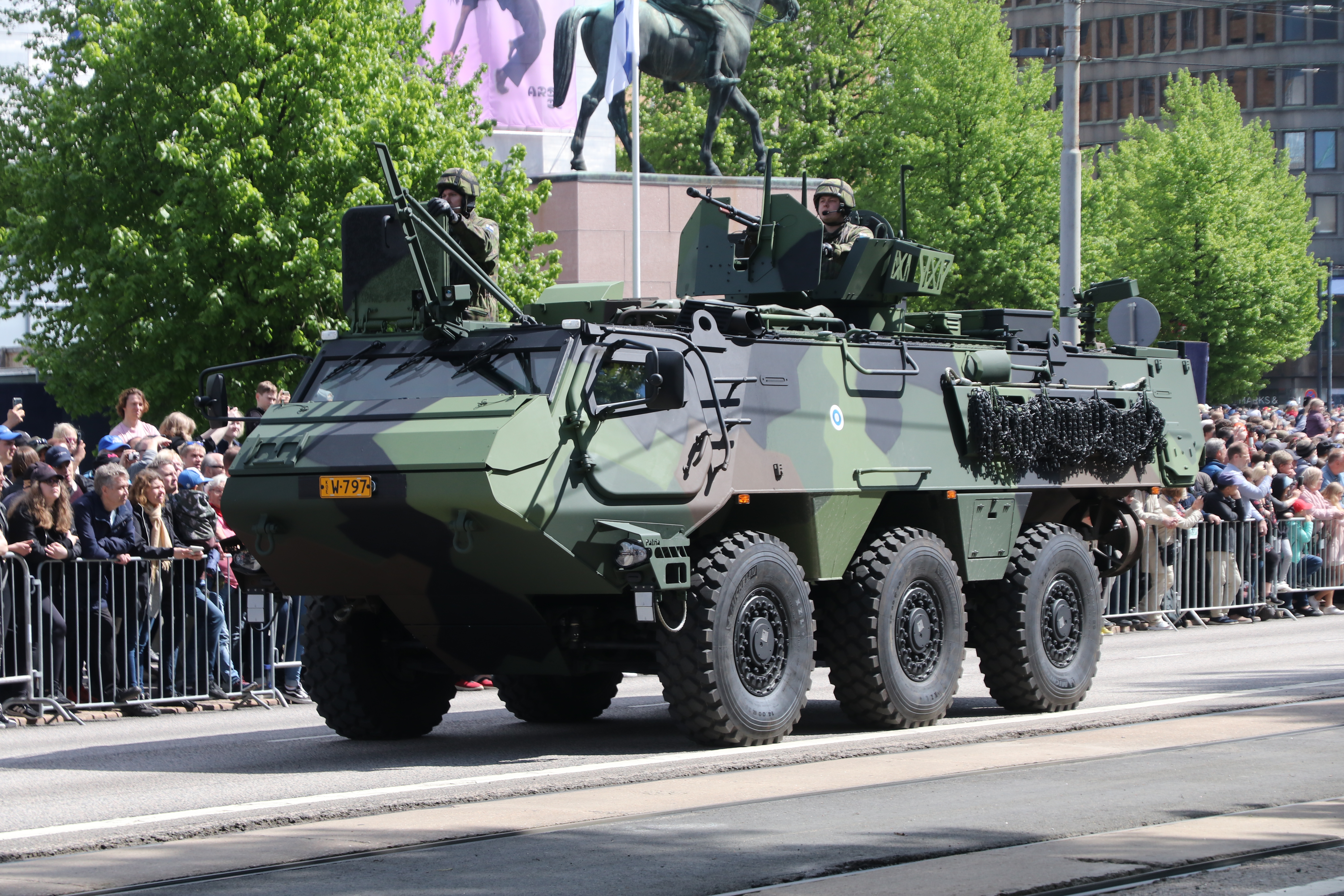
Patria 6×6 in Finnish Army

The Patria 6×6 (Patria XA-300) is a six-wheeled armoured personnel carrier produced by the Finnish defence industry company Patria.

Patria 6×6 is primarily designed for troop transport but can be configured for other roles as well. The basic platform can be tailored to meet varying user requirements by many optional features e.g. swimming system, winch, upgraded armour protection and diverse weapon systems. Available weapons range from machine gun up to 25/30 mm medium calibre direct fire weapon systems and Patria Nemo 120 mm turreted mortar system.

The layout has driver and commander in front, engine compartment behind the driver and rear compartment for troop and role specific equipment. A passage in right side allows moving between front and rear compartments.

Patria 6×6 chassis is based on Patria AMV^{XP} structures and components. The expected service life of the vehicle is more than 30 years.

== History ==
Patria 6×6 was launched at Eurosatory 2018 exhibition in June 2018. A variant with Patria Nemo turreted mortar system was exhibited in DSEi 2019 and a Heavy Armoured Personnel Carrier variant with 25 mm remote weapon system in DSEi 2021.

== Common Armoured Vehicle System programme ==
=== CAVS programme history ===
In early 2020 Finland, Estonia and Latvia agreed a joint development programme for Common Armoured Vehicle System (CAVS) based on Patria 6×6. The programme remains open for other nations to join it. As a result of CAVS programme, Latvia announced an order for over 200 vehicles. First vehicles were delivered in October 2021.

On 24 May 2024, the "Defence Partnership Latvia" production facility in Valmiera was opened, which has the capacity to produce up to 160 "Patria 6×6" armored vehicles per year. Finland followed with a letter of intent to procure 160 vehicles in 2023.

The Finnish Defence Forces signed an agreement with Patria to acquire three pre-series vehicles delivered by summer 2022 for test use before the final serial order.

=== Further nations joining the programme ===
In 2022, Sweden and Germany joined the CAVS programme. On 30 January 2025 Patria published that Germany is now a full member of the procurement program.
In November 2025, the Swedish Armed Forces have commissioned the procurement agency FMV to purchase a further 94 Patria 6×6 vehicles through the CAVS programme. Sweden already ordered 321 Patria 6×6 vehicles in 2024, which are known in Sweden as Pansarterrängbil 300. The total of 425 CAVS vehicles are to be delivered by 2030.

In September 2025, Norway and the United Kingdom joined the programme.

The Netherlands joined the CAVS programme in November 2026.

== Operators ==
=== Current operators ===
==== CAVS framework ====
Denmark (130)
Danish Army
- Denmark announced on 1 April 2025 its intention to purchase 130 vehicles, which are to be used in a variety of roles, including supporting its light infantry regiment. The first batch of the order is expected to be delivered later in 2025.This variant will be equipped with a M18 ring turret from Sima Innovation, equipped with a M2 Browning and 4 smoke-grenade dischargers on each side of the turret. This turret is already in use on the Piranha V APC of the Danish Army. The Danish Army received the first delivery on 1 December 2025.
Finland (165)
Finnish Army
- 3 pre-series vehicles ordered in January 2022
- 91 vehicles ordered in June 2023 + 70 in option deliveries to start in 2023
- In January 2024, 41 additional vehicles ordered from the 70 in option
- In April 2024, one pre-series Heavy APC variant ordered + 18 in option
- In September 2024, the last 29 vehicles ordered from the 70 in option
Germany (349 + option for 527)
Germany selected the Patria 6×6 as the successor of the TPz Fuchs (around 1,000 vehicles in 30 variants). Germany joined the CAVS programme in June 2022. In January 2025, the German Armed Forces asked Patria to submit a binding offer for an initial order of 300 vehicles of the 1,000 required..
Framework agreements signed:
- December 2025: 876 TPz NG
Orders:
- December 2025:
  - Firm order for 349 vehicles (€747 million)
    - 10 APC (like the Swedish variant)
    - 48 PzAufklGrp (armoured reconnaissance group transport)
    - 170 PiGrp (Pioniergruppe, engineer group transport)
    - 69 Patria NEMO
    - 52 fire control vehicles
  - Options for 527 vehicles:
    - 14 PzAufklGrp
    - 54 PiGrp
    - 61 Patria NEMO
    - 398 fire control vehicles
Germany received the first five vehicles in February 2026.
Latvia (256)
Latvian Land Forces
- Procured 200 vehicles (to be delivered between 2021 and 2029)
- 56 Patria 6×6 C2 command and control vehicles ordered in November 2024
Sweden (34 delivered, + 401 on order)
The Swedish Army joined the R&D phase of the program in June 2022.
- 20 vehicles ordered in April 2023 for the Lifeguard Regiment, with a delivery after the summer 2023. The local designation was revealed, "Pansarterrängbil 300". It is a pre-serie production.
  - Follow-up orders (serial production):
    - 321 in March 2024, to be produced in multiple variants (troop transport, command and control, medical transport). Delivery from 2025 to 2029. By December 2025, 14 were delivered.
    - 94 in December 2025, to be delivered by 2030.

==== Other operators ====
Ukraine (42)
42 vehicles ordered in February 2025, first deliveries in July 2025. On 10 February 2025 Latvian Ministry of Defence ordered 6 additional vehicles, meant to be delivered to Ukraine. Delivery of the final batch took place in early November 2025.

=== Potential orders ===
Germany (3,500 planned)
As of July 2025, the government announced an intent to purchase 3,500 of the vehicles.
Lithuania (936 planned)
In May 2026, the State Defense Council approved the acquisition of Patria 6×6 armored personnel carriers, a total of 936 vehicles.
Netherlands
The Netherlands joined the CAVS programme in November 2026.
Norway
In September 2025 Norway joins the CAVS programme.
In August 2026, Norway ordered 20 vehicles in a command configuration, with an option for 40 vehicles. The vehicles will be equipped with a Protector RS4 weapon station.
United Kingdom
In January 2025, Babcock UK and Patria signed a MoU to supply this vehicle to the UK Army.

=== Failed bid ===
Estonia
The Estonian Land Forces joined the CAVS Programme with Finland and Latvia in 2019, but later dropped out of the program.
Estonia ordered 230 vehicles for €200 million from Turkish defence companies: Otokar ARMA (6×6) and Nurol Makina NMS (4×4).
Germany
SpähFz NG program (Spähfahrzeug Next Generation):
Replacement of the Fennek scout vehicle, program launched in October 2023, in competition against the Piranha V 6×6 and the Iveco SuperAV. The vehicles will have to be armed with a 25 mm gun, to use the Thales D-LBO systems, potentially to be amphibious. 2 prototypes to be delivered in 2026, 90 in 2027–2028, and 160 in option.
In 2024, the Piranha V 6×6 was pre-selected.

== See also ==
- Patria NEMO
- Patria AMOS
- Patria AMV - Larger and more heavily armored 8x8 vehicle
- Patria Pasi - Predecessor to Patria 6×6
- Protolab Misu

Comparable 6×6 APC

- TPz Fuchs – (West Germany)
- Pandur I – (Austria)
- Pegaso BMR – (Spain)
- Iveco Puma – (Italy)
- LAV I – (Canada)
- VBTP-MR Guarani – (Brazil)
- Otokar Arma – (Turkey)
- Ratel – (South Africa)
- Type 87 RCV – (Japan)
- WZ-551 – (China)
- Anoa – (Indonesia)
