= Low Carbon Vehicle Event =

Annual exhibition in the UK

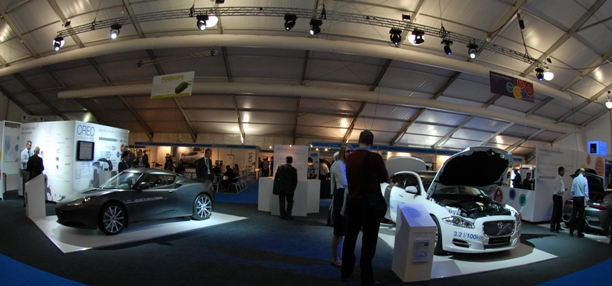
The Low Carbon Vehicle Event 2013 Internal Exhibition

The Low Carbon Vehicle Event (LCV), is the United Kingdom's premier low carbon vehicle event. It is held annually since 2008 at Millbrook Proving Ground at the beginning of September. The show consists of a technological exhibition, seminars sessions and Ride & Drive (of latest research and development and commercial available low emission vehicles) activities. LCV is a business-to-business free-to-attend event organised by Cenex and whose main aim is promoting the UK supply chain of the low carbon vehicle industry.

== LCV history ==
The Low Carbon Vehicle Event has been organised annually from 2008 by Cenex and supporting partners include: The Department for Business, Energy and Industrial Strategy, The Centre for Connected and Autonomous Vehicles, The Office for Low Emission Vehicles, The Department for International Trade, The Advanced Propulsion Centre, The Automotive Council UK, Innovate UK, The Low Carbon Vehicle Partnership, Millbrook, The Society of Motor Manufacturers, and Transport Systems Catapult.

== LCV 2016 ==
The event attracts a range of customers (Automotive 53%, Energy & Infrastructure 8%, Government & Local Authority 7%, Academia 8%) and senior managers including those at board level [38%] and middle management [27%].

LCV2016 set a new record attendance with 3,137 visitors, 226 exhibitors and 1180 organisations represented.
