= Combat Boat 2010 =

Swedish coastal combat vessel

Class overview
- Operators: Swedish Navy

General characteristics
- Tonnage: 56 long tons (57 t)
- Length: 24.1 m (79 ft 1 in)
- Beam: 5.24 m (17 ft 2 in)
- Draft: 1.17 m (3 ft 10 in)
- Propulsion: 2 × waterjets, 2.65 MW (3,550 hp)
- Speed: 37 knots (43 mph; 69 km/h)
- Armament: 1 × SSG120 twin-barreled 120 mm (4.7 in) mortar turret; 1 × 12.7 mm (0.5 in) Browning machine gun in Lemur turret

The Combat Boat 2010 also known as the "Stridsbåt NY" was a large coastal combat vessel designed to carry the SSG120 dual 120 mm mortar system in order to provide naval gunfire support to the Swedish Amphibious Forces. Development began in 2005 and progressed until specifications and blueprints were largely finished. In 2008, Genomförandegruppen decided that Sweden would not be buying the AMOS mortar system, and the project was cancelled.

== See also ==
- CB90-class fast assault craft
- Antasena-class combat boat

== Sources ==
- Protec Magazine nr 1 - 2007
