= Energy Technologies Institute =

UK Energy research institute

The Energy Technologies Institute (ETI) was a public-private partnership between global energy and engineering companies and the UK Government that was established in the United Kingdom in 2007. The government set up the ETI following an announcement in the 2006 budget speech. The purpose of the ETI is to “accelerate the development, demonstration and eventual commercial deployment of a focused portfolio of energy technologies, which will increase energy efficiency, reduce greenhouse gas emissions and help achieve energy and climate change goals”. The institute works with a range of academic and commercial bodies.

Deployment of the technologies involved, which are expected to contribute to the reduction of the UK's carbon emissions, is expected to begin around 2018.

Commentators generally welcomed the new body as likely to make a positive contribution in the efforts to minimise climate change. At the same time, they pointed to the slow pace of government action in promoting energy conservation and implementing existing low-carbon technologies, compared to progress in a number of other European countries.

== Funding ==
In addition to initial funding for the ETI, the Department for Business will provide £50 million a year over a period of 10 years starting in 2008–09. When establishing the ETI, the government expected the separate Energy Research Partnership to raise matching funding from commercial organisations.

As of September 2006 EDF Energy, Shell, BP and E.ON UK had committed to providing funds. By 2014, this had grown to include Caterpillar and Rolls-Royce.

== Objectives ==
Five objectives were set for the institute:

- To increase the level of research and development funding to meet the UK's energy policy goals.
- To deliver research and development that facilitates the rapid commercial deployment of cost-effective, low-carbon energy technologies.
- To provide better strategic focus for commercially applicable energy related research and development in the UK.
- To connect and manage networks of the best scientists and engineers to deliver focussed energy research and development projects to accelerate eventual commercial deployment.
- To build research and development capacity in the UK in the relevant technical disciplines to deliver the UK's energy policy goals.

The ETI describes as its vision: "Affordable, secure, sustainable energy for present and future generations."

== Research focus ==
The institute set out to focus research on a mixture of technologies.

As of 2014, the ETI states that typically it supports projects that:

- Develop and demonstrate system level capabilities based on novel low carbon energy technologies or services
- Create additional value through the capabilities of the ETI Industry Members and Project Partners
- Create new partnerships - improving skills, knowledge, capabilities and supply chain capacity
- Create benefit in the UK and globally - through deployment, skills, knowledge base or exports
- Reduce risk associated with novel energy systems and supply chains
- Identify barriers requiring “next generation” science and technology support
- Inform development of regulations, standards, and policy

At the same time, the institute focuses on a mix of technologies to increase security of supply, and solutions to address fuel poverty.

In 2017 the ETI started the Nuclear Cost Drivers Project, which aims to identify cost reductions in nuclear power plant design, construction and operation, so enabling more widespread deployment of new nuclear.

== Background ==
Historically, since the privatisation of the country's energy industries, public sector support for energy research and development in the UK has come from a variety of bodies with little co-ordination between them. Problems experienced as a result of this included poor continuity of funding, and the availability of funding for certain parts of the research-development-commercialisation process but not others. Funding levels have also been low by international standards.

== Location ==
In September 2007, it was announced that the Midlands Consortium had been chosen to host the ETI. The consortium comprises the Universities of Birmingham, Loughborough and Nottingham with financial support from Advantage West Midlands and the East Midlands Development Agency. The hub of the ETI is based at Loughborough University, on the Holywell Park area of the campus, at the heart of the university's Science and Enterprise Park.

== Closure ==
In December 2019, after 12 years in operation, the ETI was closed. Data and findings from the ETI will continue to be available online through the programme pages until 2025.

== See also ==
- Cenex, also at Loughborough
- UK Energy Research Centre
- Energy Systems Catapult
