= Patria NEMO =

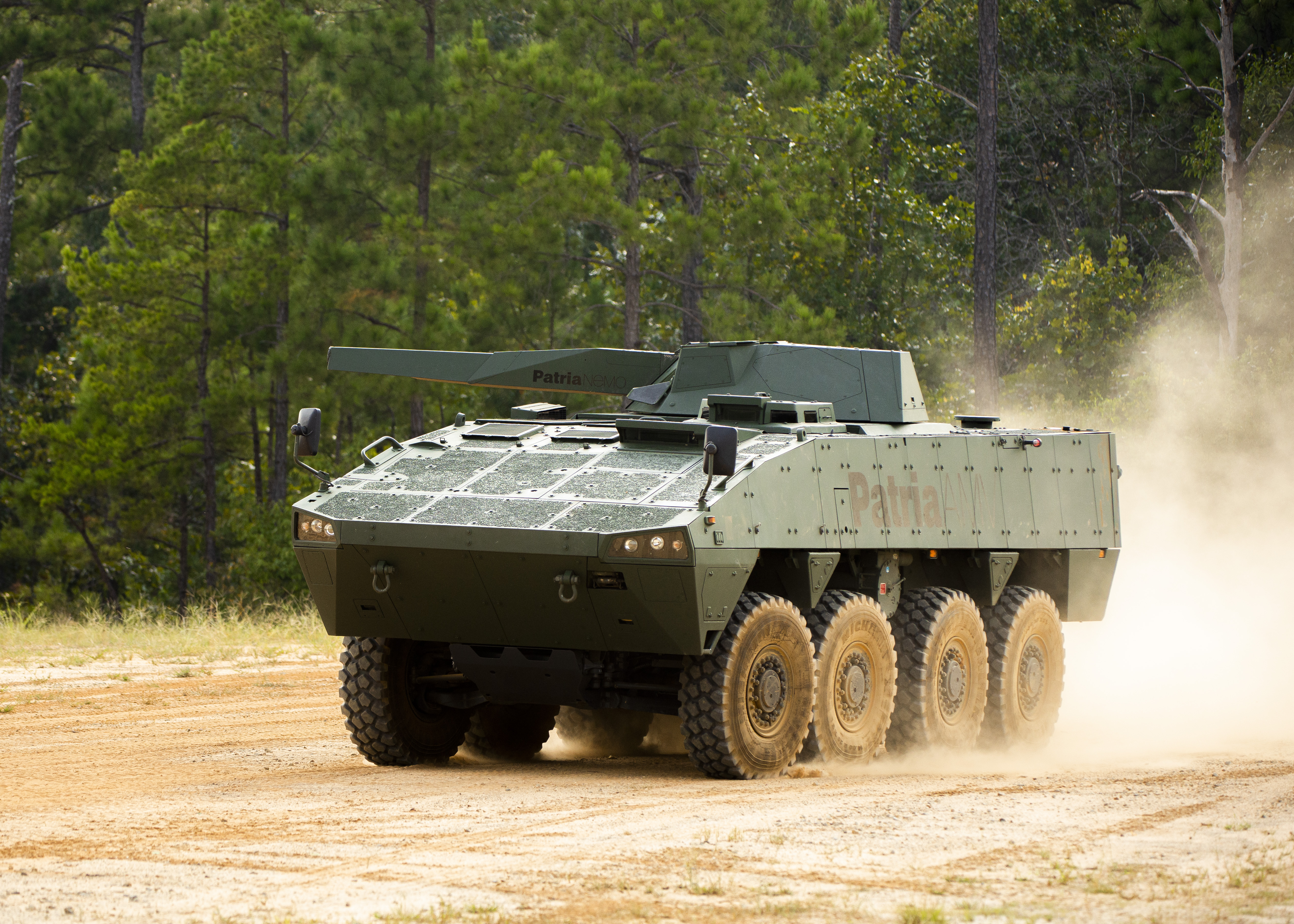
- Patria NEMO AMV
- Type: Single-barrel, remote-controlled self-loading mortar system
- Place of origin: Finland

Production history
- Designer: Patria Land Oy
- Designed: 2005–2008
- Manufacturer: Patria

Specifications
- Mass: 1,900 kg (4,200 lb)
- Barrel length: 3,000 mm (9.8 ft)
- Crew: Unmanned turret, 3 in vehicle + driver
- Shell: Standard mortar smoothbore + stub case or smart guided ammunition. Typically HE
- Caliber: 120 mm (4.7 in) smoothbore
- Breech: Half-automatic wedge
- Recoil: Hydro-pneumatic suspension
- Elevation: −3° to +85°
- Traverse: 360°
- Rate of fire: 10 rounds/minute (max); 6 rounds/minute (sustained)

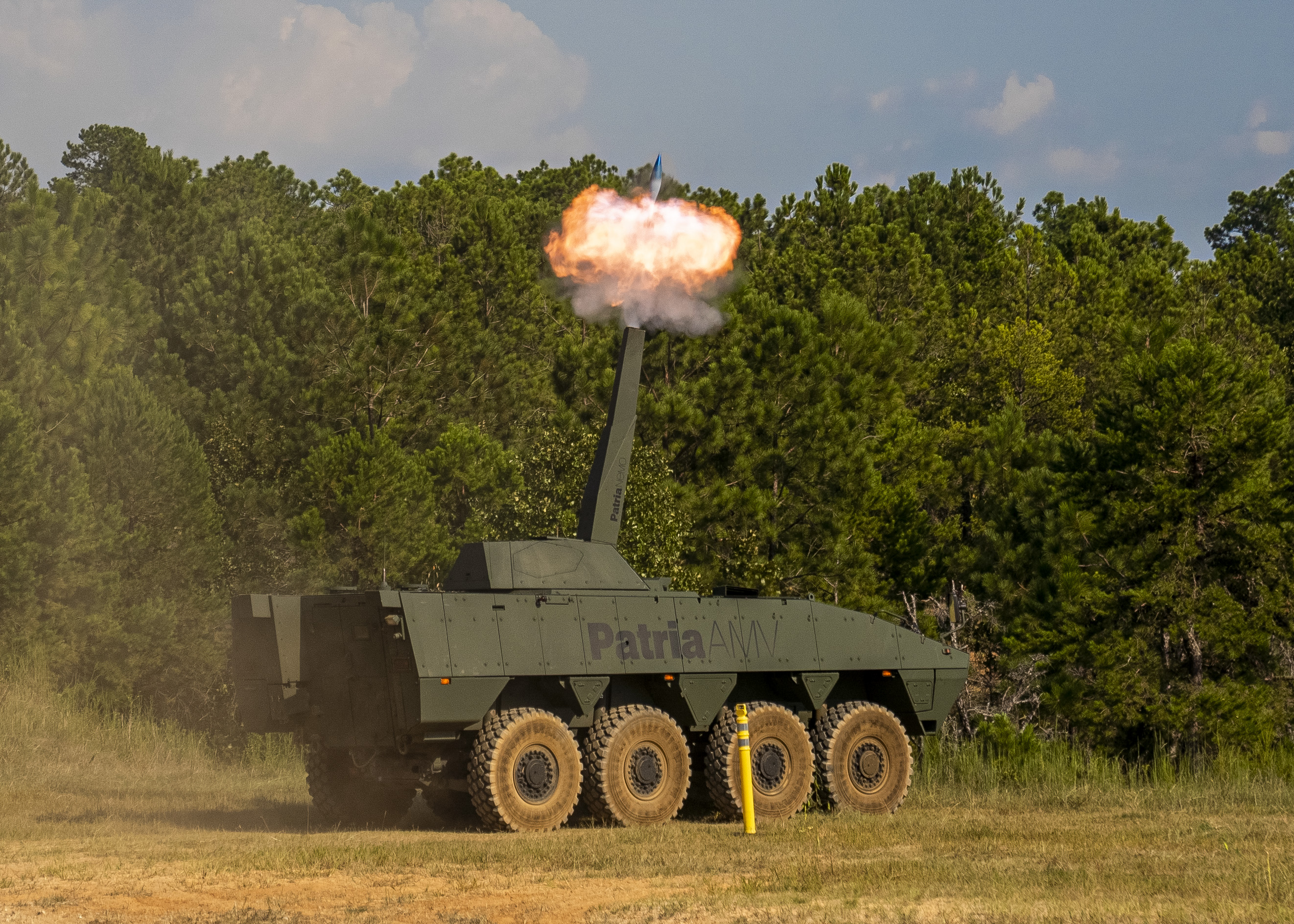
Patria NEMO AMV firing indirect fire.

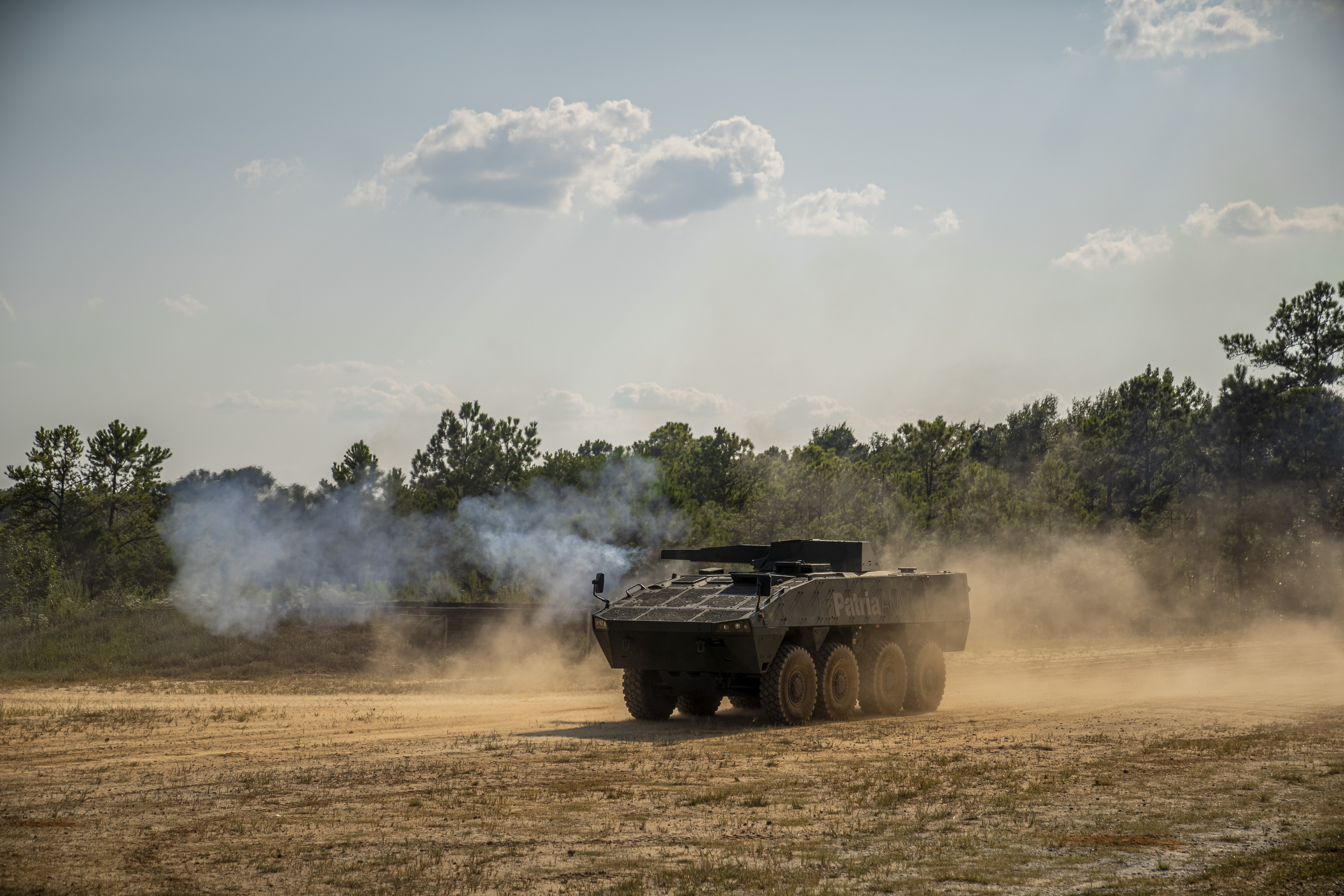
Patria NEMO AMV firing direct fire.

NEMO (from "NEw MOrtar") is a single barrelled 120 mm remote-controlled mortar turret currently being developed by Patria Land Oy in Finland. It is a lighter version of the AMOS mortar system, which has been in use within the Finnish Defence Forces since 2013. The NEMO can be fitted to most APCs and also to smaller landing craft, such as the Finnish Jurmo-class landing craft.

== History ==
The first customer of the weapon system was the Slovenian Army, which ordered 12, while the United Arab Emirates Naval Forces bought 12 patrol boats, where some were to be equipped with NEMO mortars. Saudi Arabia bought 36 turrets to equip its LAV II vehicles. Recently, Patria is offering the NEMO system fitted into standardised 27 ft (8.2 m) containers to increase flexibility: the mortar container can be lifted with and fired from a truck or a boat or can be set on the ground, e.g. as base defense. Training simulators are also available.

=== Variants ===
Three variants exist as of 2023:

- Patria NEMO Land Turret Vehicles presented with this turret:
  - Artec Boxer
  - Patria AMV
  - Patria 6×6
  - AMPV
  - BvS10
  - GD UK Ajax
  - KF41 Lynx
  - Patria TRACKX
- Patria NEMO container
- Patria NEMO Navy

== Operators ==
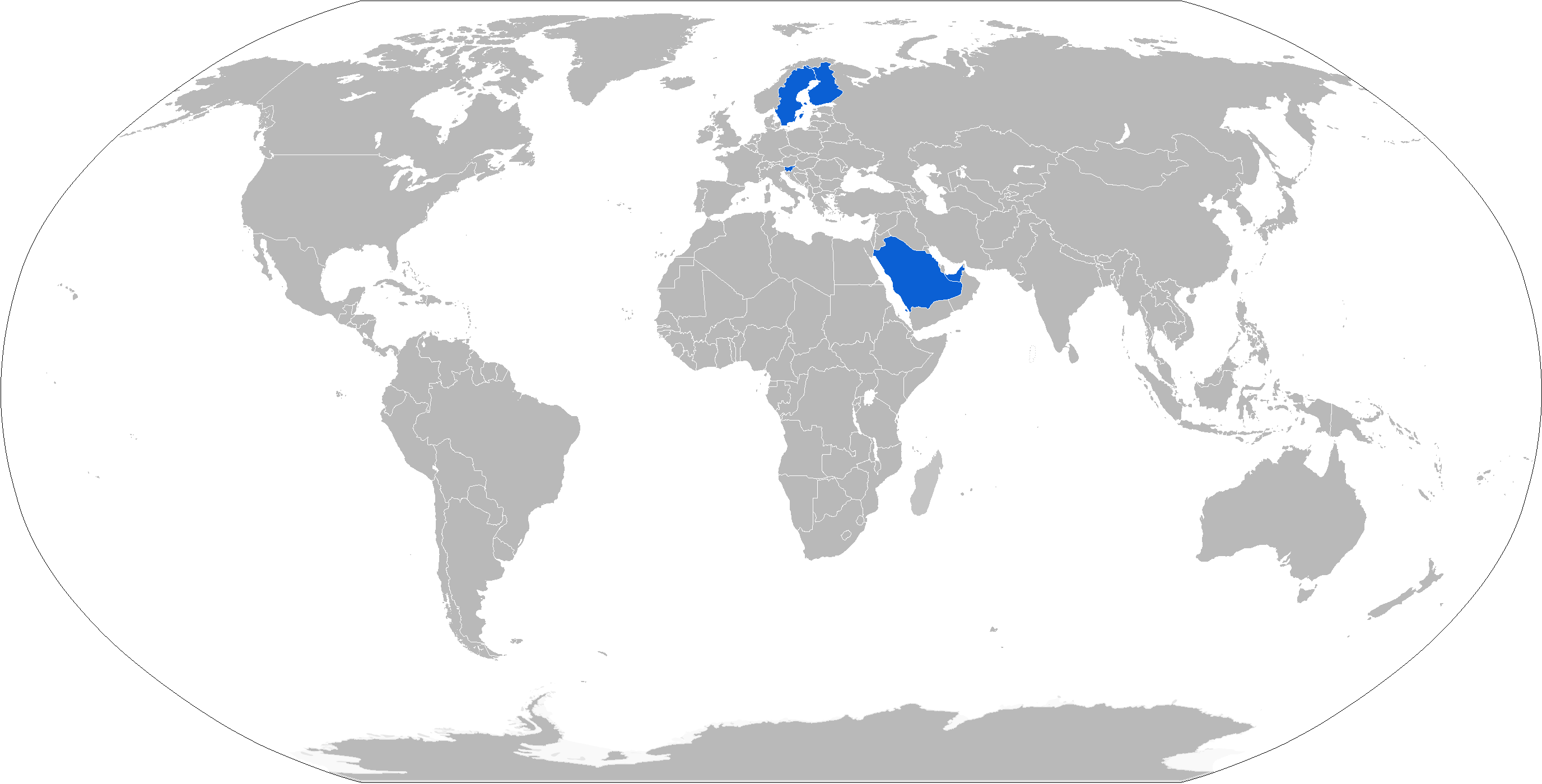
Map of NEMO operators in blue

=== Current operators ===
Saudi Arabia (36 NEMO Land Turrets)
Ordered in September 2010, installed on the LAV II, and operated by the Saudi Arabian National Guard.
Slovenia (NEMO Land Turrets)
In 2006, Slovenia ordered 24 Patria NEMO and 135 Patria AMV on which the turrets would be installed. This contract was the first export success of this weapon system. In the end, only 30 Patria AMV were delivered as Slovenia decided to reduce the order. The contract was scrapped in 2012 for financial reasons, but this cancellation was also supported by the corruption case against Patria. It is unclear how many turrets are in service as sources contradict each other, from none to 12 in service.

Sweden (2 NEMO container systems)
2 "NEMO container systems" ordered by the FMV (Försvarets materielverk, the Swedish Defence Materiel Administration) for the Swedish Army. The containers have been use for trial in combination with the Fast Supply Vessel.

United Arab Emirates (NEMO container systems + 6 NEMO Navy)
The UAE Navy uses the NEMO system on Ghannatha vessels are high-speed, aluminium multi-role ships manufactured by Abu Dhabi Ship Building, ADSB and designed by Swede Ship Marine. In 2015, the phase II of this program included the completion of:
- the construction of 12 Ghannatha 27 m (89 ft) vessels
- the retrofit of 12 Ghannatha 25 m (82 ft) vessels already in service, among which, 6 were retrofitted with a Patria NEMO turret.
- 2 turrets that can be installed on containers, or used to perform a rotation for maintenance.

=== On order ===
Germany (69 NEMO Land Turrets)
The German Army was looking for a new mortar carrier to replace its M113 as part of the programme ZukSysIndF kRw (Zukünftiges System Indirektes Feuer kleiner Reichweite). From the existing information, it would be equipped installed on the successor of the TPz Fuchs 1, where the potential candidates are the Patria 6×6, the Pandur Evo 6×6 and the TPz Fuchs 2. In January 2025 the Patria 6x6 was selected.
As of September 2024, the NEMO turret seems to have been selected, and the procurement would be presented to the Bundestag in 2024.
In January 2025, a €50 million deal was signed to develop the Patria 6×6 equipped with the turret.
In December 2025: 69 were ordered, with an option for 61 systems.
Hungary (24 NEMO Land Turrets)
In April 2025, Hungary selected the NEMO mortar turret to be installed on the Lynx platform. At least 24 are on order.
Sweden (8 NEMO Navy)
In 2009, the Swedish navy cancelled the order for the AMOS which was supposed to equip an attack vessel. Initially, the expected vessel to be used was the CB90, but it was discovered to be too small to carry the AMOS. A new ship was therefore planned, the Combat Boat 2010. But because of financial reasons, this program was cancelled. In 2023, following the invasion of Ukraine, the budget of the armed forces increased, enabling the purchase of 8 "Fast Mortarboats" from Swede Ship Marine.

=== Potential orders / Interest ===
Czech Republic (62 NEMO Land Turrets)
The Army is looking for 62 self-propelled mortars, capable of indirect, semi-direct and direct fire and most likely on the Pandur II (8×8). The competitors are the Patria NEMO and the M120 Rak. The NEMO is the most likely winner.
Spain (NEMO Land Turrets)
Spain is looking for a heavy mortar system for the Dragon VCR and the ASCOD VAC. The NEMO is a potential candidate.
United Kingdom (NEMO Land Turrets)
Patria and Rheinmetall unveiled a mission module for the Boxer equipped with a NEMO mortar system at the Defence Vehicle Dynamics 2024. It aims at providing a solution for the British Army’s new Armoured Mortar Variant.
United States (NEMO Land Turrets)
The US Army has been studying potential 120 mm mortar turrets to replace its M1064 mortar carrier (M113 variant) and M1129 mortar carrier (Stryker variants), and to equip its AMPV. Demonstration and trials have been ongoing since October 2020. In 2024 BAE systems delivered to the US army a prototype variant of the AMPV that fielded the Patria NEMO mortar turret. As of May 2024, it is unknown whether or not the US army will be moving forward with this prototype. In September 2024, trials of the AMPV equipped with a Patria NEMO mortar turret took place in Fort Moore, Georgia.

== See also ==
- Light-weight combat vehicle – (Japan)
- AMOS – (Finland)
- M120 Rak – (Poland)
