= Genomförandegruppen =

Genomförandegruppen ("The Implementation group") was the name of an internal work group that in 2008, within the Reinfeldt Cabinet Office, in Sweden was formed, which, according to a press release later issued by the Cabinet office, had been tasked to "produce decision basis for continued effectivisation of the [Swedish] defence force's materiel procurement".

The Group was also claimed to have been tasked to propose how a "purposive materiel supply adapted to needs of the new intervention defence" could be achieved. The proposal aimed to reduce costs, aligning with the cabinet's policy favoring market-based solutions, moving from domestic development to '"buy off the shelf' purchasing options, despite criticism that there was no 'Panzermarkt' readily available for such acquisitions. Genomförandegruppen was led by the secretary of state from the Defence Department Håkan Jevrell, the other participants were state secretary Hans Lindblad (Finance Department), state secretary Jöran Hägglund (Enterprise Department), the members of parliament Holger Gustafsson (KD), Anders Svärd (C) och Allan Widman (Fp). To their assistance, they had a secretariat of public servants from the Defence Department at their disposal.

The group which did not consult military experts within the armed forces, wrote a report made public in 2008 where they presented an extensive list of procurements, projects and studies that were to either be reduced or eliminated. Critics, including prominent military bloggers WisemanWisdoms and Skipper, strongly disapproved of the report, referring to it as the result of "amateur's night", not least because the abrupt terminations often resulted in higher costs than to complete the projects. The Riksrevision's inquiry concluded that the cuts affected defense capabilities significantly and that actual savings were lower than Genomförandegruppen had initially predicted due to unforeseen costs.

Among the cancelled:

- Air defence missiles for the Visby-class corvette.
- REMO (renovation/modification) for CV90 and strv 122.
- Purchase of the newly developed AMOS-turret to mount in the 40 CV90 chassis already built for the specific purpose.
- Materiel for CAS to Swedish forces in international service.
- Purchase of tactical UAV for forces on international missions.
- Halflife REMO for HSwMS Orion (A201). This later resulted in the vessel having to be replaced as no longer seaworthy.
