= Cenex =

British non-profit research consultancy

Centre of Excellence for Low Carbon and Fuel Cell Technologies
- Abbreviation: Cenex
- Formation: April 2005; 19 years ago
- Type: Private Limited by guarantee without Share Capital Exempt from using Limited
- Purpose: Promotion of low carbon vehicle transport
- Headquarters: Cenex, Holywell Building, Holywell Park Loughborough, Leicestershire, LE11 3UZ
- Coordinates: 52.762°N 1.250°W
- Chief Executive: Robert Evans
- Website: Cenex

Cenex, the Low Carbon and Fuel Cells Centre of Excellence, is an independent non-profit research and consultancy that helps private and public sector organisations devise ULEV strategies. Founded in 2005, Cenex is headquartered in Loughborough, United Kingdom.

== History ==
Cenex was established in April 2005 with support from the Automotive Unit of the British Department of Trade and Industry, Its goal was to assist British automakers in responding to the transition to low carbon and fuel cell technologies.

In 2008, Cenex founded the low Carbon Vehicle Event (Cenex-LCV). The event includes exhibitions, seminars, networking, and opportunities to ride and drive prototype vehicles.

== Transport Team ==
The Cenex Transport Team helps clients to implement low and ultra-low emission vehicle technologies into fleet, freight and logistics operations. These include hydrogen, gas and electric vehicles.

Cenex created the VC3 tool to calculate and compare the whole life costs and carbon emissions of diesel, electric, gas and stop-start van technologies. The Cenex CLEAR Capture (Cost-effective Low Emissions Analysis from Real-world Date Capture) plug obtains drive cycle data information from a vehicle.

The Transport Team has worked with British Gas on an EV Deployment Risk Assessment, reducing construction carbon emissions in logistics, and Hydrogen Van trials.

== Energy Systems Team ==
The Energy Systems Team works with developers of infrastructure to integrate vehicles with the National Grid. Cenex also supports and advise on the installation of low emission vehicle infrastructure across the UK and Europe.

Cenex chairs the UK Electric Vehicle Supply Equipment Association (UKEVSE).

== Innovation Support Team ==
The Innovation Support Team runs programmes on behalf of Central and Local Governments to develop the UK supply chain of low emission vehicle technology.

Cenex has worked with Nottingham City Council, and led the InclusivEV project, which investigated the potential for electric vehicles to be used to tackle transport poverty.

== See also ==
- Energy Technologies Institute, also at Loughborough
