= TPz Fuchs =

Amphibious armoured personnel carrier

TPz Fuchs 1
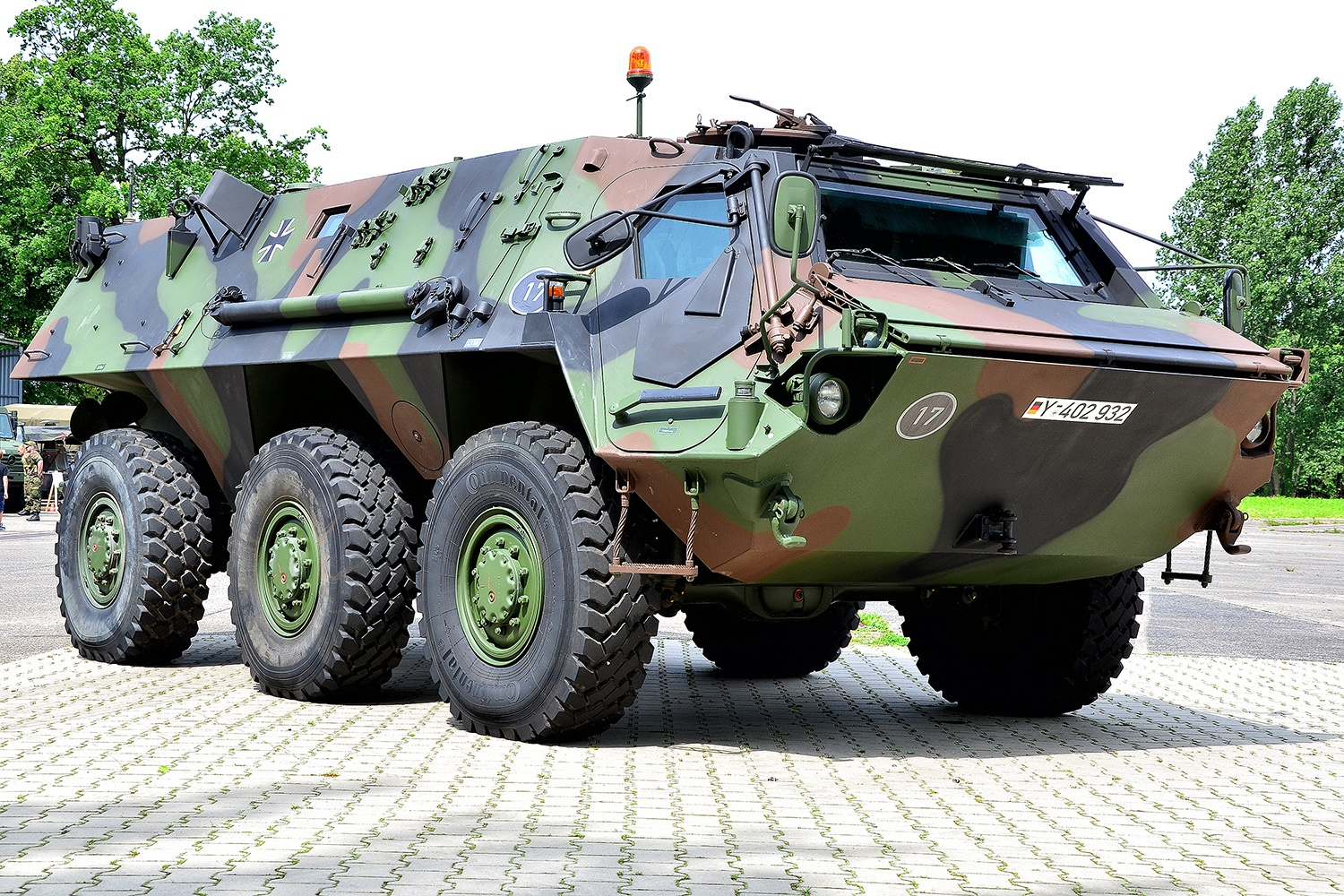
- TPz 1 Fuchs
- Type: 6x6 Amphibious armoured personnel carrier
- Place of origin: West Germany

Service history
- In service: 1979–present
- Used by: Bundeswehr and other (see Operators)

Production history
- Designer: Daimler-Benz
- Designed: 1961–1979
- Manufacturer: Rheinstahl Wehrtechnik (original)
- Produced: 1979 - 2004
- No. built: 1,236 (estimate)
- Variants: German Army variants: TPz 1/Standard, 504 delivered; TPz 1A1/EloKa, 87 delivered (not amphibious); TPz 1A2/Funk, 265 delivered fitted with a Rüstsatz (installation kit for various roles); TPz 1A3/ABC or Spürpanzer Fuchs, 140 delivered (NBC reconnaissance vehicle); TPz 1A7 (upgrade); TPz 1A8 (upgrade)

Specifications (TPz 1A8)
- Mass: 17,000 kg (37,000 lb) unladen 23,500 kg (51,800 lb) combat
- Length: 6.8 m (22 ft)
- Width: 2.98 m (9.8 ft)
- Height: 2.5 m (8.2 ft)
- Crew: 2 + 10
- Armor: Steel armour (various upgrades and applique kits developed)
- Main armament: Varies, 1x Rheinmetall MG3 machine gun
- Secondary armament: Smoke grenade launchers
- Engine: Mercedes-Benz Model OM 402A V-8 liquid-cooled diesel engine 320 hp (240 kW) at 2,500 rpm
- Payload capacity: 6,500 kg (14,300 lb)
- Transmission: ZF 6HP500 automatic transmission with 6 forward and 1 reverse gears coupled to a single-speed transfer case to all axles
- Suspension: coil springs and shock absorbers
- Fuel capacity: 390 L (86 imp gal; 100 US gal)
- Operational range: 800 km (500 mi)
- Maximum speed: 105 km/h (65 mph); 10 km/h (6.2 mph) in water

TPz Fuchs 2
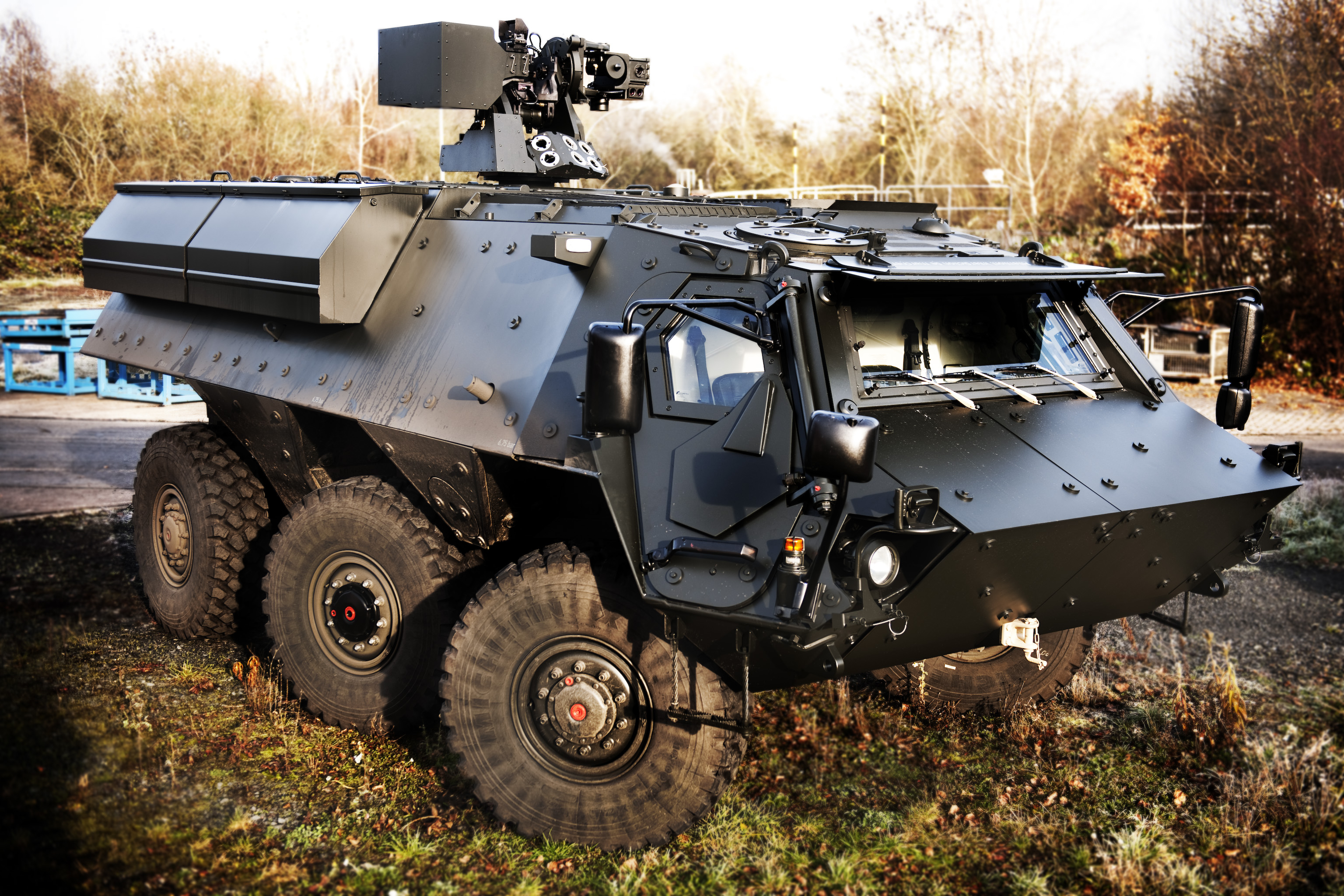
- TPz 2 Fuchs
- Type: 6x6 Wheeled armoured personnel carrier
- Place of origin: Germany

Service history
- In service: 2007 (first deliveries) to date
- Used by: Algeria, Kuwait, United Kingdom and United Arab Emirates

Production history
- Designer: Daimler-Benz (original Fuchs 1); Fuchs 2 is a development of Fuchs 1 by the now RMMV
- Designed: Overarching project for a complete vehicle range from 1964
- Manufacturer: Rheinmetall MAN Military Vehicles (RMMV)
- Produced: Since 2005
- No. built: 564 (1,800 for TPz Fuchs 1 and 2)

Specifications (TPz Fuchs 2)
- Mass: 17,000 kg (unladen approx.); 23,000 kg (combat)
- Length: 6.83 m (22.4 ft)
- Width: 3.04 m (10.0 ft)
- Height: 2.54 m (8.3 ft)
- Crew: 2 + 9
- Armor: Steel armour (various upgrades and applique kits developed)
- Main armament: Varies, 2 x MG 3 general purpose machine guns
- Engine: MTU 6V 199 TE20 V6 turbocharged water-cooled 4-stroke EURO 3 compliant diesel 456 hp (340 kW) at 1,800 rpm
- Payload capacity: 6000 kg
- Transmission: ZF 6HP 602 fully automatic with 6 forward and 1 reverse gears coupled to a STU single-speed transfer case
- Suspension: coil springs and shock absorbers
- Fuel capacity: 390 L
- Operational range: 800 km (500 mi)
- Maximum speed: 105 km/h (65 mph); 10 km/h (6.2 mph) in water

The TPz Fuchs from Transportpanzer Fuchs is a German armoured personnel carrier originally developed by Daimler-Benz, and manufactured and further developed by Rheinmetall MAN Military Vehicles (RMMV). Fuchs was the second wheeled armoured vehicle to enter service with the Bundeswehr (West German military). It can be used for tasks including troop transport, engineer transport, bomb disposal, nuclear, biological and chemical reconnaissance and electronic warfare. RMMV and its predecessors manufactured 1,236 Fuchs 1, mostly for the German Army.

Further development of the design resulted in the Fuchs 2, first shown in 2001. The enhanced Fuchs 2 is currently in production. Known customers include the Algerian Army, the Kuwait Army and the United Arab Emirates Army (UAE).

== Development ==
In 1977, Rheinstahl Wehrtechnik (which in 1996 became Henschel Wehrtechnik, then Rheinmetall Landsysteme and now Rheinmetall MAN Military Vehicles (RMMV), under licence from Daimler-Benz, was awarded a contract by the German Army for 996 Transportpanzer Fuchs 1. The first production vehicle was handed over in December 1979, with deliveries running at 160 per year and concluding in late 1986.

German Army designations for Fuchs 1 as delivered were:

- TPz 1/Standard, 504 delivered (TPz 1 Standard could be fitted with various installation kits for different battlefield missions)
- TPz 1A1/EloKa, 87 delivered (electronic warfare variant, not amphibious)
- TPz 1A2/Funk, 265 delivered (command vehicle, fitted with a Mission Kit (installation kit) for various roles)
- TPz 1A3/ABC or Spürpanzer Fuchs, 140 delivered (NBC reconnaissance vehicle).

By early 1998 the German Army had upgraded 55 Fuchs 1 with additional protection, for use in the former Yugoslavia.

In 1997, as a further development of the Fuchs 1, two pre-production Fuchs KRK (Krisenreaktionskräfte - German: "Crisis Reaction Forces") were built, with production vehicle options for 50 units expected in 1999. The type never entered quantity production.

In 2002, the German BWB awarded a €45 million contract to upgrade 123 Fuchs 1 APCs. The work was carried out between 2004 and 2007 at Kassel, where the vehicles were originally built. Vehicles upgraded under this contract were given the TPz A7 designation.

The latest upgraded Fuchs 1 are given the TPz A8 designation. Deliveries of these to the German Army began in March 2008. It introduced improved protection against mines and IEDs, specially for German units stationed in Afghanistan. The most recent TPz A8 upgrade award brought totals to 168 vehicles. Late in 2013, it was stated that, in the long term, the German Army planned to retain a fleet of up to 728 Fuchs 1 upgraded to TPz A8 standard.

Continued development of the Fuchs 1 resulted in the Fuchs 2. It was shown to the public for the first time at the 2001 MSPO in Poland. In 2005, the first order for Fuchs 2 was for Nuclear, Biological and Chemical (NBC) reconnaissance variants for the United Arab Emirates (UAE).

In 2014, the German Ministry of Economic Affairs and Energy confirmed that it had approved the transfer of production equipment to Algeria to enable local production of the Fuchs 2.

Kuwait ordered a batch of Fuchs 2 in 2015. These will be manufactured in Germany.

== Description ==
The hull of the Fuchs is constructed of all-welded armoured steel. The driver sits at the front on the left, with the vehicle commander to his right. There are doors for both the driver and commander. The door windows and windscreen have metal shutters that can be closed up. When closed up, the periscopes fitted in the roof of the vehicle, to the front of the driver's hatch, allow visibility out of the cabin. The commander has a circular roof hatch.

The troop/cargo compartment, which is at the rear of the vehicle, is 3.2 m (10 ft) long, 1.25 m (4.1 ft) high and 1.5 m (4.9 ft) wide at its widest point. On the Fuchs 2, the roof height has been raised by 145 mm (5.7 in) for greater internal volume. Two assisted doors are fitted at the rear. On the Fuchs 2, a ramp is an option.

There are three or four hatches in the roof of the troop compartment. In APC configuration, the ten infantrymen carried by Fuchs 1 are seated on individual bucket-type seats, five on each side. These seats can be folded up when not required. Fuchs 2 seats up to nine on much-improved blast-resistant seating.

The normal amphibious payload for Fuchs 1 is 4,000 kg (8,800 lb). Depending on configuration and protection options, up to 5,000 kg of cargo can be carried on land. The Fuchs 2 has a maximum payload of 6,000 kg.

Motive power for the Fuchs 1 is provided by a Mercedes-Benz Model OM 402A V8 12.8-litre water-cooled diesel engine, with 320 hp (240 kW). This is coupled in a powerpack set-up, to a six-speed planetary gear torque converter transmission. In the Fuchs 2, the powerpack is upgraded to a MTU 6V 199 TE20 V6 11.9-litre water-cooled EURO 3 emissions compliant diesel producing 456 hp (340 kW). This is coupled to a ZF 6HP 602 fully automatic six-speed transmission with integrated retarder. For test purposes, the power pack of the Fuchs can be run outside the vehicle.

The rigid Mercedes-Benz drive axles are of the hub-reduction type, fitted with differential locks and are sprung by progressively acting coil springs and shock-absorbers. Power-steering is on the front four wheels. The Fuchs 2 offers the option of a central tyre inflation system (CTIS). The 1400 R20 tyres are of the run-flat type. On land the maximum speed is 105 km/h (65 mph). The operational range is 800 km.

The Fuchs was designed as an amphibious vehicle. Water propulsion is provided by two four-bladed propellers mounted one either side of the hull at the rear. Maximum water speed is approx. 8 km/h. For steering, the propellers can be swivelled through 360°. Before entering the water, a trim vane, which is stowed on the glacis plate when travelling, is hydraulically erected. Bilge pumps are fitted. As part of the TPz A8 upgrade, the amphibious capability is removed, but the vehicles can wade up to 1.3 m.

The welded steel hull of the Fuchs was designed to protect the crew from armor-piercing small arms fire and shell splinters. For service with the United Nations Implementation Force (IFOR) operating in Bosnia, a higher level of protection was required and a batch of Fuchs 1 were upgraded with passive fibre compound add-on armour package developed by IBD-Deisenroth. This armour package includes an add-on armour mounted externally on the sides of the hull; internal spall liners fitted to the hull sides, rear and roof to reduce the secondary effects of particles having penetrated the main armour; additional elements in the floor area of the front and rear compartments to provide increased protection against mines; new windows with increased protection and modification of the window protective shields.

The TPz A7 upgrade included protection enhancements, as does the current TPz A8 upgrade. For the TPz A7 and A8 upgrades, additional elements protect the underside and lower part of the hull against blast and IED threats.

The baseline Fuchs 2 provides protection against small arms armour-piercing attack through a full 360°. To meet different threat levels, the Fuchs 2 has been designed to be fitted with enhanced passive armour packages developed by IBD.

To enhance survivability while conducting Military Operations in Urban Terrain (MOUT), Rheinmetall has developed a modular upgrade package for installation on tracked and wheeled armoured vehicles. A MOUT demonstrator vehicle was completed in 2008, based on the Fuchs 1.

Armament varies according to mission requirements. The Fuchs 1 can mount a 7.62 mm Rheinmetall MG3 general-purpose machine gun over the commander's position. Vehicles of the Armoured Reconnaissance Battalion, Panzergrenadiers mechanized infantry, the Franco-German Brigade, the mountain infantry and the Jägers of the German Army have previously been fitted with the MILAN anti-tank guided missile, but these are no longer in service. All vehicles have six 76 mm grenade dischargers mounted to fire forwards. Vehicles deployed to Afghanistan were equipped with a GMG grenade launcher or an M2 Browning heavy machine gun instead of an MG3.

The Fuchs 2 can be fitted with a wide range of weapon systems up to and including a 30 mm cannon and 7.62 mm MG, as well as various missile installations, such as anti-tank missiles.

Standard equipment for the Fuchs 2 includes an NBC system and an air conditioning system. Numerous options available include an automatic fire detection and suppression system, winch, global positioning system and an auxiliary power unit (APU).

== Variants ==
The TPz Fuchs has been spotted in a number of variants, which, if anything, speaks to its great versatility.

Some of the variants discovered so far are listed below:

- TPz Fuchs APC - Unarmed Transport version
- TPz Fuchs APC - Armed with 7.62mm MG
- TPz Fuchs Milan - Armed with a single Euromissile Milan launcher
- TPz Fuchs EM MCT - (Euromissile Milan compact turret). Was equipped with a twin Milan Launcher mounted on top of the Fuchs vehicle.
- TPz Fuchs PARS 3 MR - Was armed with a single PARS 3 MR launcher
- "JgdPz" Fuchs - Was equipped with a quad turret of PARS 3 MR launchers
- Wildcat 30 - A twin 30mm Self-Propelled-Anti-Air-Gun system
- Fuchs with Cockerill 90mm gun turret
- Fuchs JAGM - Tank Destroyer version.

== Operators and export sales ==
=== Current operators ===
==== Fuchs 1 ====
Germany (1,041)
996 Fuchs 1 delivered from 1979, 45 additional Fuchs 1 were ordered in 1991. Various upgrades undertaken including 124 to TPz A7 standard and 168 to latest TPz A8 standard (728 required).

Israel (8)
8 Fuchs NBC were loaned from German Army stocks during the first Gulf War. These are thought to remain in use.

Kuwait (11)
11 Fuchs 1.

Netherlands (24)
24 electronic warfare Fuchs 1 variants delivered. In 2006 12 of these were converted to an NBC role.

Norway (8)
8 Fuchs 1 NBC.

Saudi Arabia (36)
36 Fuchs 1 were delivered (exact date unknown). 14 APC, 8 ambulance, 4 command post, 10 NBC.

United Arab Emirates (32)
Fuchs 2 NBC reconnaissance vehicles ordered in February 2005 under a contract valued at €160 million (US$205 million). The order comprises 16 NBC reconnaissance vehicles, eight bio vehicles and eight command post vehicles, which will provide the UAE with a complete NBC detection capability linked to a command-and-control system.

United Kingdom (11)
Eleven Fuchs 1 NBC variants (ex-German Army) delivered in 1990. These vehicles were put into storage in 2011. A regeneration project was launched in February 2014. Eight vehicles are used by Falcon Squadron, Royal Tank Regiment, 22 Engineer Regiment with one attrition reserve and two training vehicles. The Fuchs Regeneration and Availability Service contract secured the vehicle's service life until 2019. The UK used a small number of electronic warfare versions during the 1991 Gulf War In October 2020, RBSL (Rheinmetall BAE Systems Land) announced a £16 million sustainment contract award for the UK MoD's Fuchs fleet and training simulator. The award will address equipment-related obsolescence issues and upgrade the system with the latest generation of sensing capabilities. The new support contract includes technical support, provision of spares and repairs, maintenance, training, and design services.

United States (123)
123 (current estimate) Fuchs 1, designated M93 Fox. The General Dynamics Land Systems (GDLS) M93 Fox NBCRS (Nuclear Biological Chemical Reconnaissance System) vehicle is the US variant of the Fuchs 1 NBC reconnaissance vehicle. The requirement for an NBC reconnaissance vehicle, for use by US Forces in the European theatre, was first recognised and a three-phase program initiated in the late 1980s. The first phase of the project involved the evaluation of three vehicles types. The Fuchs (M93) was selected in July 1989. Phase II of the program, the Interim System Production (ISP) phase, resulted in the purchase of 48 vehicles. The Phase II vehicles were provided in two batches, one of eight vehicles and the other of 40. Phase II was completed in 1993. Phases III and IV would have included the US-licensed production of an additional 210 vehicles, supplementing the 48 already produced. In mid-1995, it was announced that the US Army had already received a previously unannounced batch of 60 ex-German Army vehicles for Operation Desert Storm. When in use by the US Army in the first Gulf War these were known by the XM93 designation. Due to downsizing of the US Army, the 210 vehicles to be purchased in Phases III and IV were not ordered. Under a number of contract awards from 1991 until around 2002, and through an interim XM931 designation, at least 128 vehicles were upgraded to M93A1 standard. From 2005, 31 vehicles were further upgraded in support of Operation Iraqi Freedom to M93A1P1 standard. To support operations in the Southwest Asia (SWA) region, an Urgent Material Requirement (UMR) was issued covering various upgrades to P2 standard for the M93A1P1. The exact number of M93 Fox NBCRS in service with the US Armed Forces is not clear. It is thought that the fleet comprised 122 vehicles, though the exact mix of M93A1, M93A1P1 and M93A1P2 variants is unknown. The previous mix, as of May 2010, was 86 M93A1, 22 of the M93A1P1 and 14 M93A1P2, with upgrades from the earlier variants to the M93A1P2 standard ongoing. The M93 is expected to be replaced in US service by the Stryker NBCRV.

Venezuela (20)
Ten Fuchs 1 were ordered and delivered in 1983. These vehicles did not have the standard NBC system installed but had 76 mm smoke grenade dischargers, an 8,000 kg capacity winch, an air conditioning system and two roof-mounted weapon systems. To the rear of the engine compartment is a Rheinmetall Landsysteme one-person turret, with an externally mounted 12.7 mm heavy machine gun. Behind this and facing the rear is a 7.62 mm light machine gun. These vehicles have full amphibious capability. Venezuela has fitted the US 106 mm M40A1 recoilless rifle to the roof of several vehicles. In February 2021 it was reported that these vehicles would be repaired and updated.

Fuchs 2
Algeria (> 500)
Algeria is one of the only user of the TPz Fuchs 2. As Rheinmetall mentions having produced more than 1,800 TPz Fuchs, and a total of 1,236 Fuchs 1 was produced, it would mean that at least 564 Fuchs 2 were manufactured. As for the background, the German Ministry of Economic Affairs and Energy confirmed that it had approved the transfer of production equipment to Algeria for production of the Fuchs 2 (6 × 6) family of vehicles. 980 Fuchs 2 were required by the Algerian Army. The first export licence for the Fuchs 2 for Algeria was approved in 2011 followed by approval for production sets to Algeria in August 2013. In June 2014 Rheinmetall confirmed that the contract was worth €2.7 billion (US$3.7 billion) and covered the supply of 980 units. The first batch of 54 Fuchs 2 for Algeria have come from the German production line and will be followed by progressive transfer of production to Algeria, but with major subsystems such as power packs and drive lines continuing to come from Germany.
In 2024, an export contract was signed by Rheinmetall for the export of parts for the production of the Fuchs 2 until 2028.

Kuwait (12)
12 Fuchs 2 ordered in mid-2015. These will be in NBC reconnaissance configuration, and deliveries will start in 2017. The contract covers training, service and spare parts.

=== Former operators ===
Turkey (2)
Two Fuchs 1 were loaned during the first Gulf War and later returned.

=== Potential operators ===
==== Fuchs 2 ====
Germany (around 1,000 in total)
Several programmes are ongoing to select new vehicles in the German Army that might see the TPz Fuchs 2 as the selected one:
- Programme Spähfahrzeug Next Generation, vehicle to be named "Korsak", the replacement of the Fennek scout vehicle. The competitors are planned to be around 20 tons and 6×6 vehicles: Mowag Piranha 6×6, Patria 6×6, and the TPz Fuchs Evolution (Rheinmetall),
- Replacement of the TPz Fuchs 1 APC: The main role of the successor would be an Armoured Personnel Carrier. The competitors are the Patria 6×6, the Pandur Evo 6×6 and the TPz Fuchs 2. Although the German government signed an agreement to develop in common the Common Armored Vehicle System" (CAVS), the Patria 6×6, the replacement of the Fuchs APC remains in competition.
- Programme ZukSysIndF kRw (“Zukünftiges System Indirektes Feuer kleiner Reichweite"): The goal of the programme is to have up to 120 mortar carriers based on the TPz Fuchs successor.

Ukraine (20)
Rheinmetall announced that they want to start to produce KF-41 and TPz Fuchs 2 in Ukraine as soon as 2024. There is uncertainty around the project.

== Gallery ==
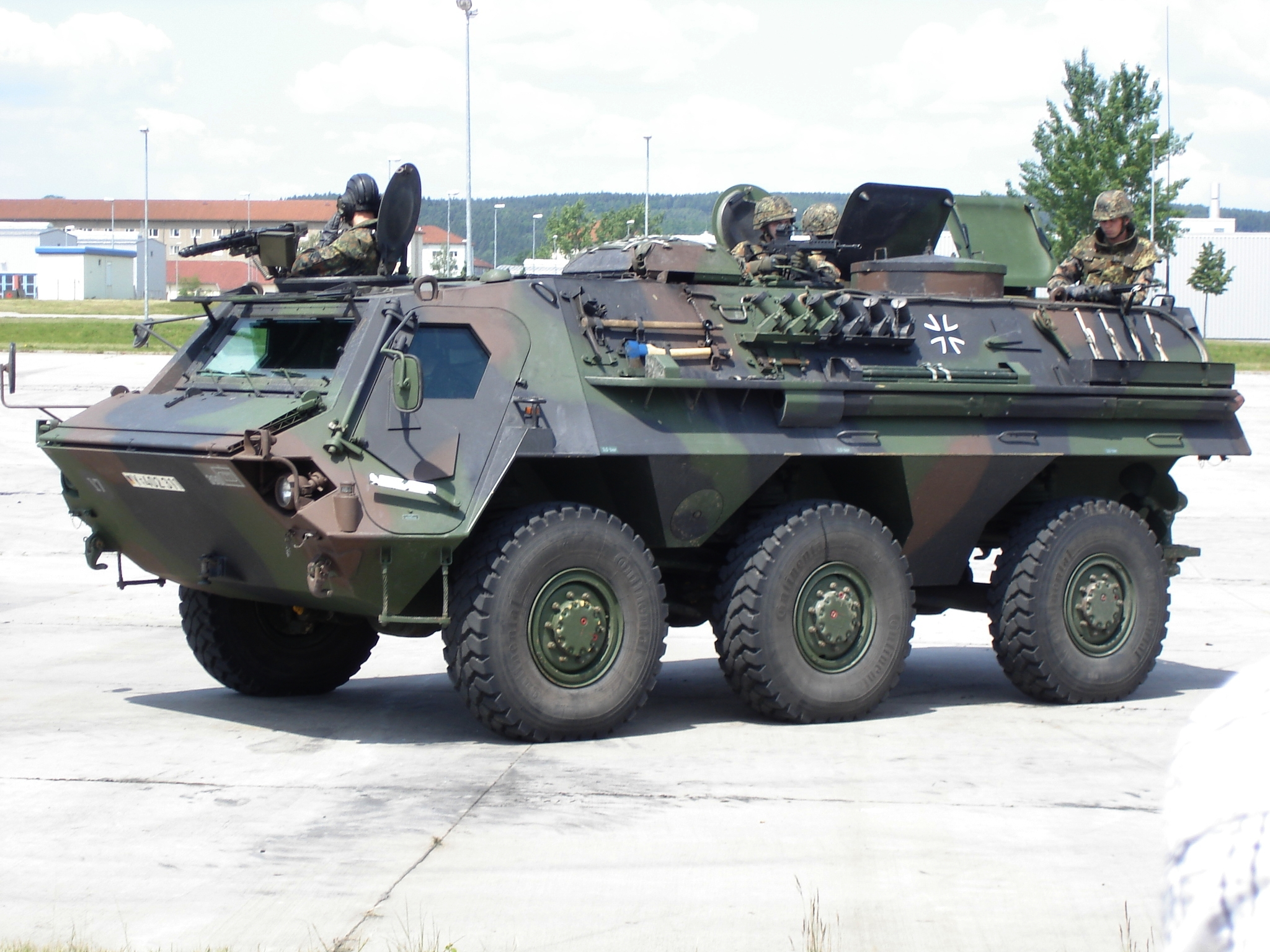
A TPz1 Fuchs Pionier.

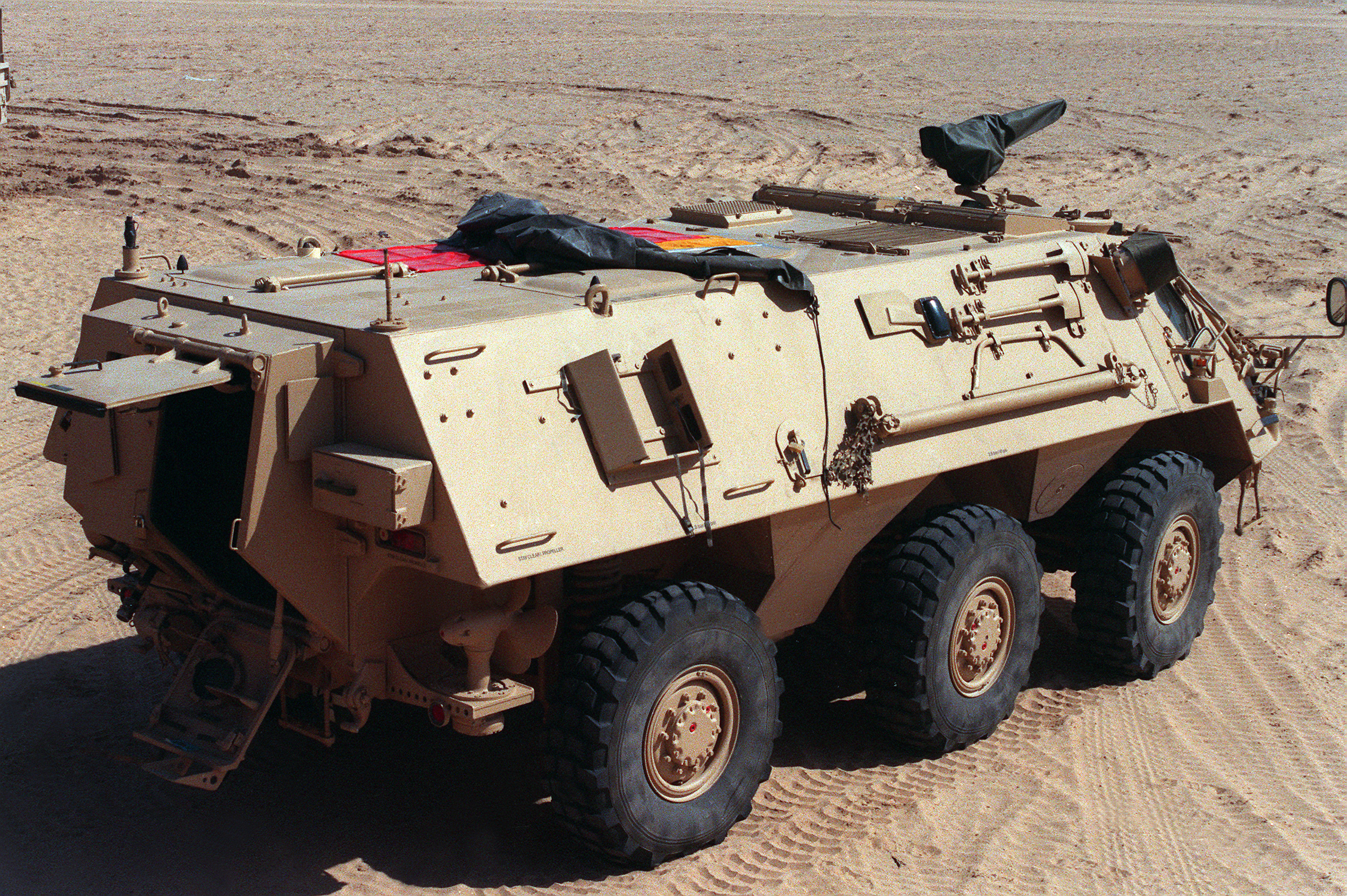
An M93 Fox

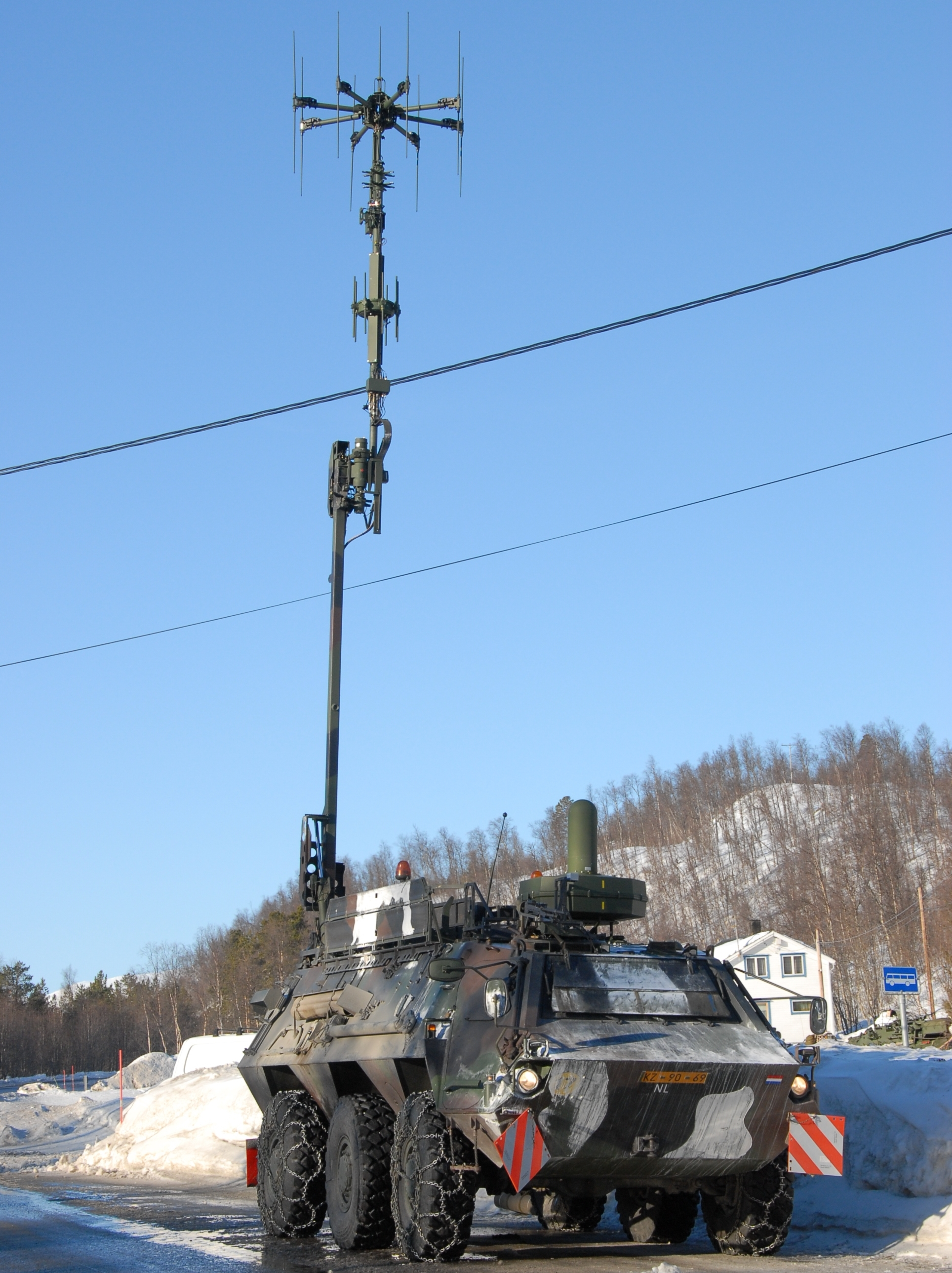
A TPz FUCHS 1 of the Dutch army in electronic warfare configuration.

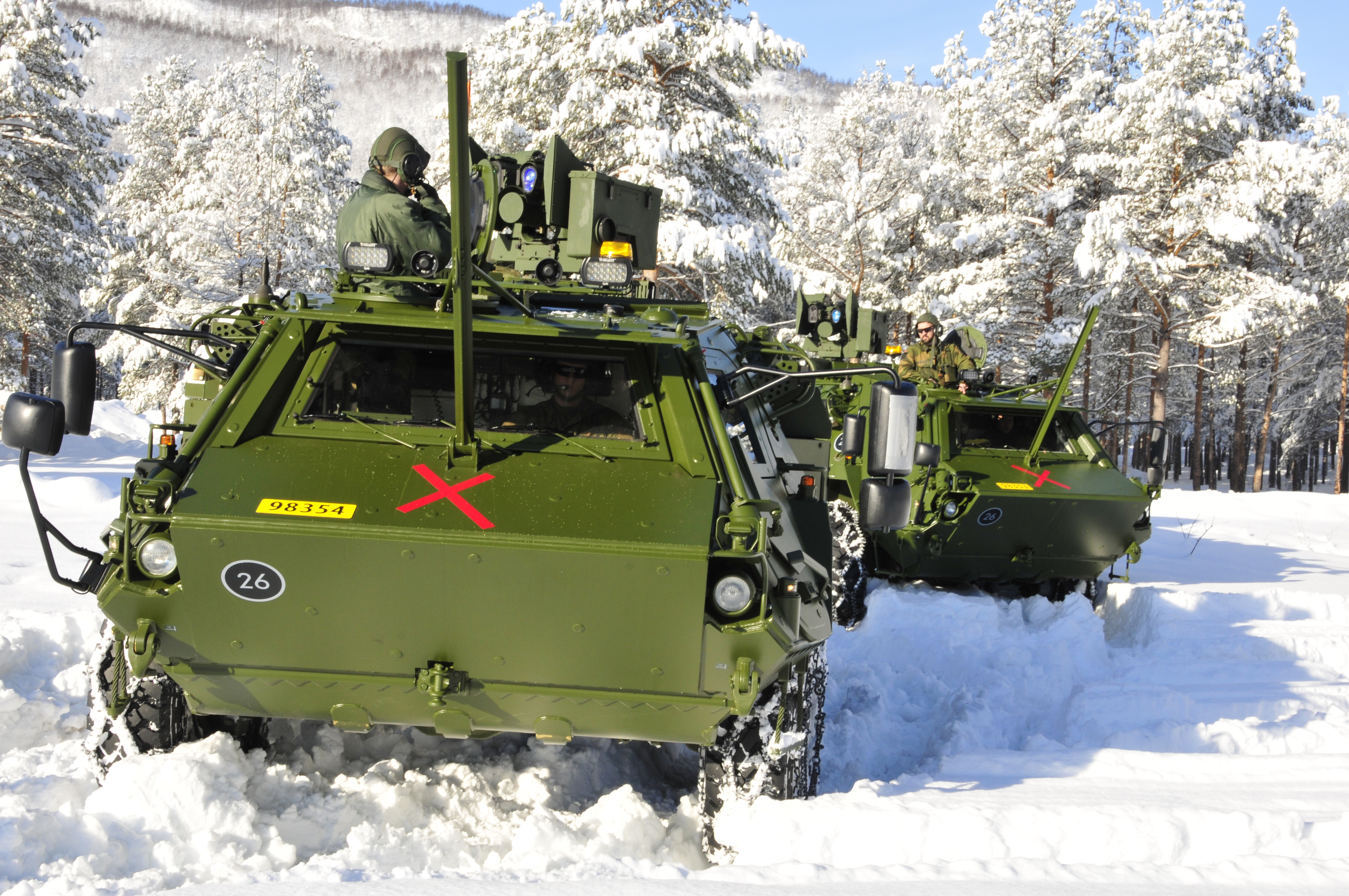
TPz FUCHS 1A8 NBC variants of Norwegian armed forces.

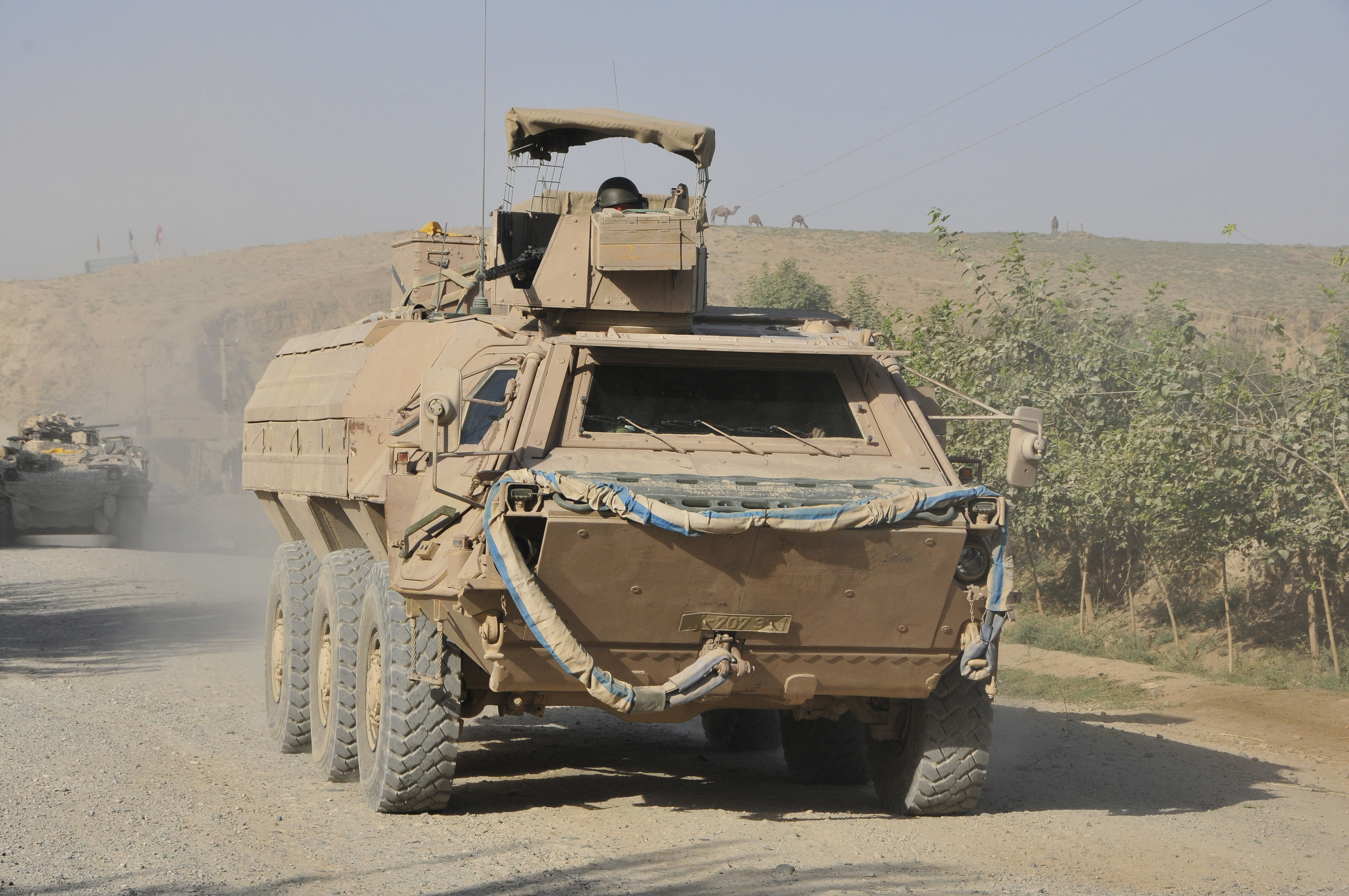
A TPz FUCHS 1A8A3 PzAufkl Bw of the German army.

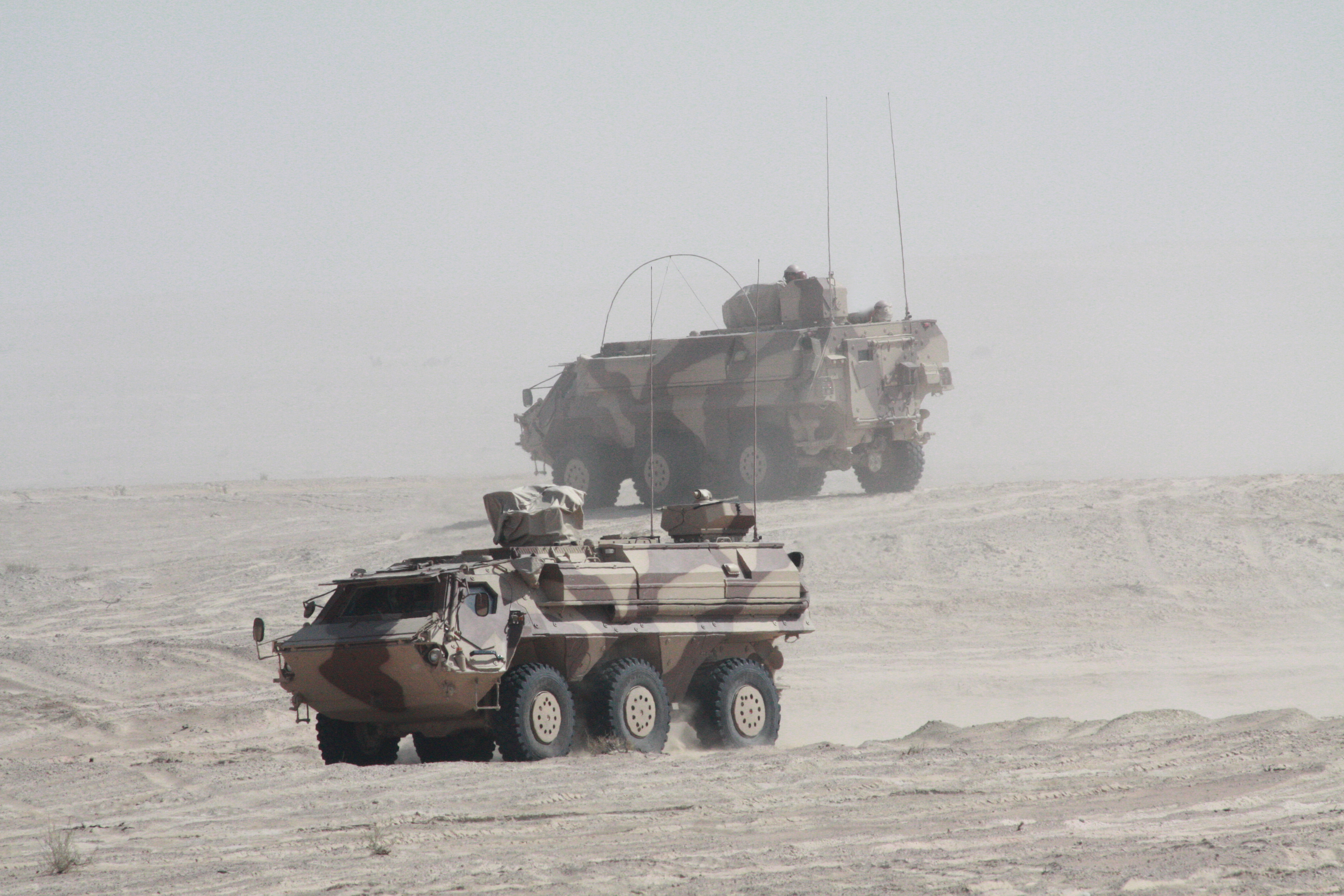
TPz FUCHS 2 NBC variants of the Emirati military.

== See also ==
- Boxer IFV – (Germany, Netherlands)

Comparable 6x6 systems

- Pandur I – (Austria)
- Patria Pasi – (Finland)
- Patria 6x6 – (Finland)
- VEC-M1 – (Spain)
- LAV I – (Canada)
- VBTP-MR Guarani – (Brazil)
- Otokar Arma – (Turkey)
- Ratel IFV – (South Africa)
- Type 87 RCV – (Japan)
- WZ-551 – (China)
- Anoa (armoured personnel carrier) – (Indonesia)

== Bibliography ==
- RMMV Fuchs 2 military brochure (2014)
- Rheinstahl Wehrtechnik Fuchs military sales literature (1980s)
- Jane's Armour & Artillery 2011/2012 ISBN 0710629605 Jane’s Land Warfare Platforms: Armoured Fighting Vehicles
- Tank Recognition Guide (Jane's) (Jane's Recognition Guide) ISBN 0007183267
