= Light-weight combat vehicle =

Light-weight combat vehicle (LCV)
- Type: Wheeled self-propelled artillery
- Place of origin: Japan

Specifications
- Mass: 16,000 to 20,000 kg (35,000 to 44,000 lb)
- Main armament: "Dual-recoil gun (mortar) system"
- Engine: diesel
- Suspension: Wheel 6×6

The light-weight combat vehicle (LCV) (軽量戦闘車両システム, keiryō-sentō-sharyō) is a wheeled self-propelled artillery vehicle under development by the Japan Ground Self-Defense Force.

== Overview ==
Many armies are looking into lighter, air-transportable vehicles that can perform many of the functions of tanks or medium artillery. Japan recently adopted the Type 16 maneuver combat vehicle which is similar to the US M1128 mobile gun system. Both are 8-wheeled lightly armored tank destroyers designed to be flown into a battle situation and keep up with fast moving infantry while providing direct fire support. Current thinking is that using the same or similar wheeled vehicle chassis carrying light artillery or heavy mortars would be useful for indirect artillery fire.

== Development ==
Research on the future multi-functional wheeled combat vehicle (light-weight combat vehicle, LCV) is ongoing. LCV has a remote turret with line-of-sight (LOS) and non-line-of-sight (NLOS) firing capabilities, and a dual recoil gun system providing adequate internal layout for combat crews. The LCV also has a hybrid power system with in-wheel motors. By raising and lowering the chassis the LCV provides both resistance against the blast effect of IEDs (improvised explosive devices) and improves driving stability.

=== Dual-recoil gun system ===
To satisfy such contrary requirements, namely that a light-weight vehicle carry and fire repeatedly a large caliber gun, LCV has introduced breakthrough technology; the so-called: dual-recoil gun system. In this system, the primary recoil brake reduces the firing reaction, followed by the secondary recoil brake which reduces the force even more. With this technology, the LCV can carry a large caliber gun on a light-weight vehicle.

== See also ==
- Armored car (military)
- AMOS – (Finland)
- Cardom – (Israel)
- M1129 mortar carrier
- Patria NEMO – (Finland)
- M120 Rak – (Poland)
