= M120 Rak =

Self-propelled mortar from Poland

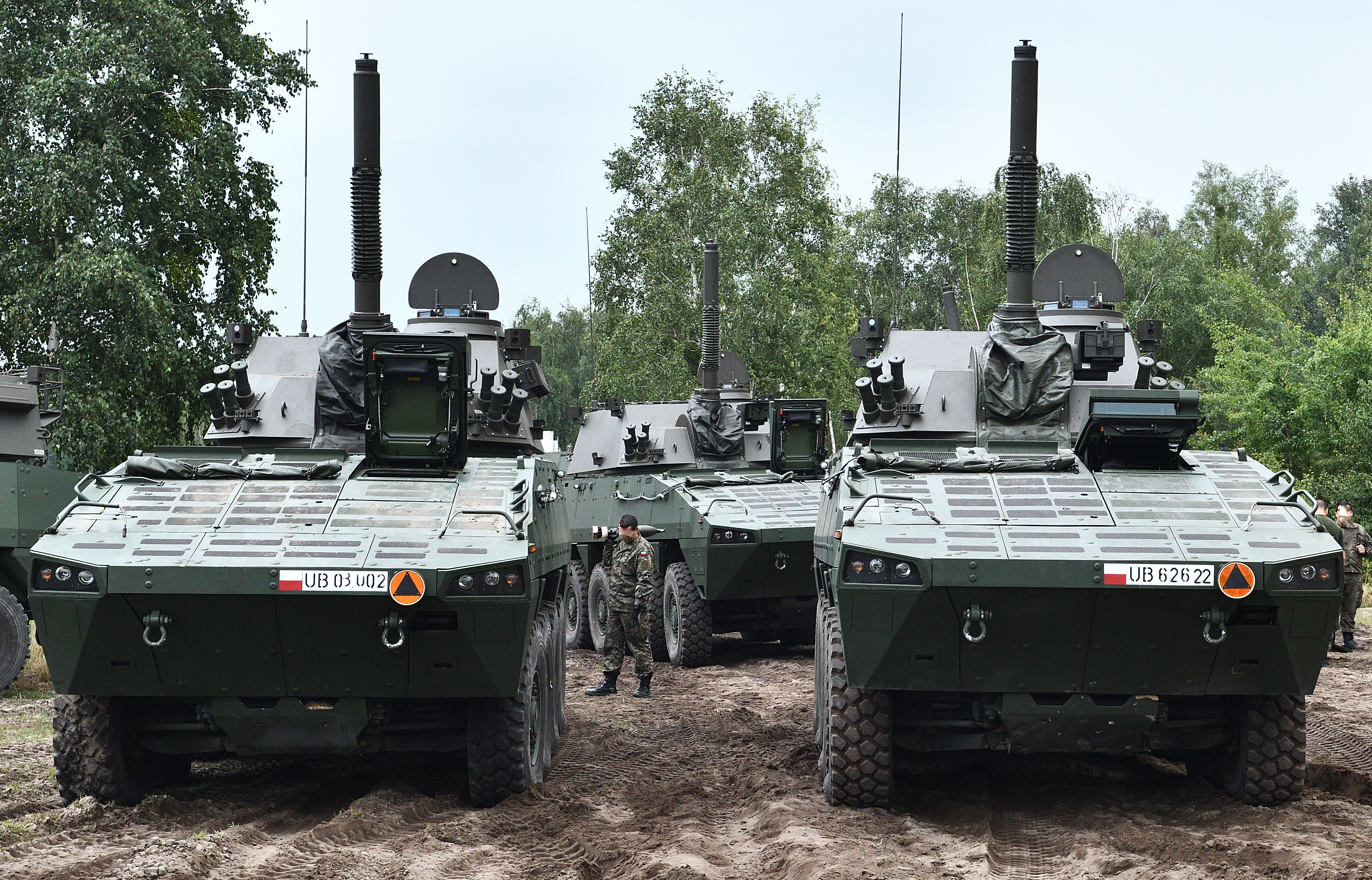
- Place of origin: Poland

Service history
- In service: 2017–present
- Used by: See operators
- Wars: Russo-Ukrainian War

Production history
- Designed: 2008
- Manufacturer: Huta Stalowa Wola
- Produced: 2016–present
- No. built: 92/122 (M120K version)

Specifications
- Mass: 24,500 kg (54,000 lb)
- Length: 7,700 mm (300 in)
- Width: 2,800 mm (110 in)
- Height: 2,150 mm (85 in) (hull)
- Crew: 4
- Armor: ARMOX 500T 8 mm thickness, STANAG 4569A Level 1
- Main armament: 120 mm mortar
- Secondary armament: 1 × UKM-2000P
- Engine: Scania D1 12 56A03PE
- Operational range: 500 km (310 mi)
- Maximum speed: 80 km/h (50 mph)

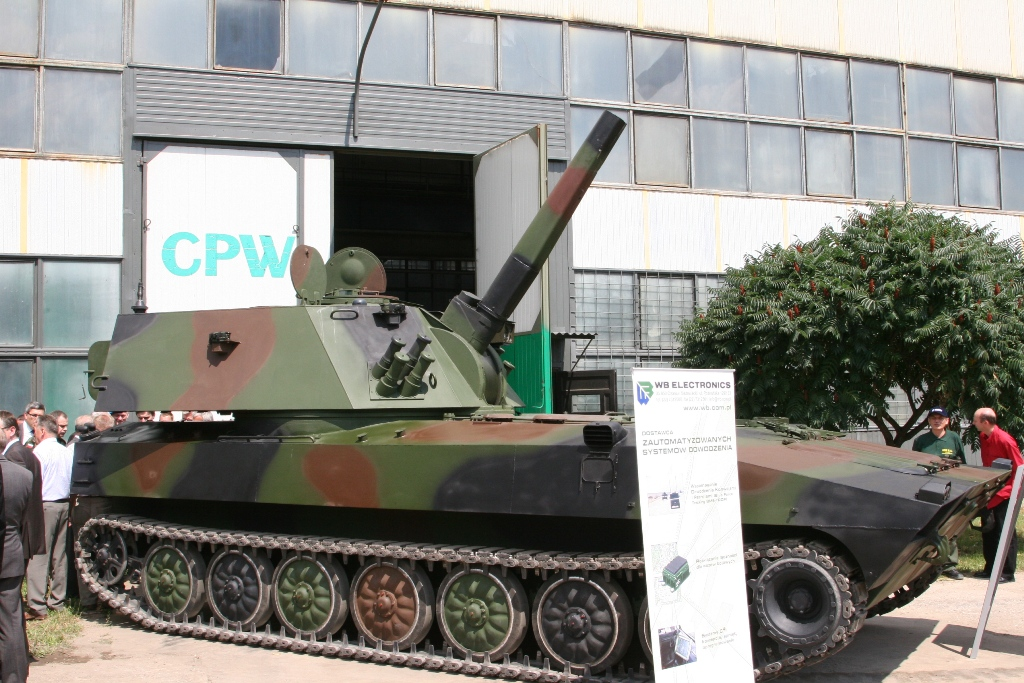
A M120G Rak prototype, 2010

M120 Rak is a self-propelled wheeled gun-mortar equipped with an automatically loaded 120 mm mortar mounted on a tracked (SMG 120 / M120G) and wheeled (SMK 120 / M120K) chassis, designed by Huta Stalowa Wola (HSW). It is produced in Poland, and used by Polish Land Forces. Serial production and the first delivery started in 2017.

== History ==
Work on the Rak mortar started in 2006, and the first prototypes were presented in 2009. It was initially designed by HSW, later with co-financing from the Ministry of Science and Higher Education. Most of the mortar elements are produced in Poland. HSW has received several patents for the construction of individual mortar solutions.

In April 2016, with the consortium of HSW and ROSOMAK S.A., a contract was signed for the supply of eight KMO Rak systems (64 M120K mortars and 32 artillery command vehicles (AWD)) in 2017–2019. In October 2019, another contract was signed for the supply of two KMO Rak systems (18 M120K mortars and 8 AWD) and two mortars for training at the Centrum Szkolenia Artylerii i Uzbrojenia (Artillery and Armament Training Center) in Toruń. In May 2020, the Inspektorat Uzbrojenia (Armaments Inspectorate) signed a contract with the consortium for the delivery of another 5 KMO Rak systems (40 RAK mortars and 20 AWD).

== Description ==
The Rak Mortar can be built on a variety of chassis. The tracked chassis version is based on the lightweight HSW tracked chassis (which was developed from the Opal APC), while the wheeled chassis is based on the Rosomak APC. In 2013, as part of the MSPO exhibition, the manufacturer presented the implementation of the mortar on the chassis of the German Marder infantry fighting vehicle. The fire set of the 120 mm self-propelled mortars, Rak, consists of eight cannons, used to throw mortar bombs at a distance.

It can shoot accurately at distances from 8 to 12 km. In addition to standard bombs, it can fire shells with a HEAT warhead for armored targets like combat vehicles, smoke shells, and illumination ammunition. The time to transition from march to the combat position is 30 seconds maximum. The combat position can be left within 15 seconds of the last shot being fired.

The complete Rak mortar system, apart from the latter, includes accompanying vehicles: artillery command vehicles (AWD), reconnaissance vehicles, technical and logistic support (ammunition) vehicles and armament repair vehicles (AWRU). The vehicle is equipped with a digital fire control system, including a thermal camera and a laser rangefinder, so it can work effectively during the day or night. The data may, inter alia, draw from the FlyEye unmanned aerial vehicle.

The Rak mortar can fire remotely as an unmanned weapon, using commands and data transmitted electronically to the vehicle's computer. Initially, until the implementation of modern ammunition with a range of 10,000 m, Polish Rak mortars use old OF843B bombs for towed mortars, modernized with special fittings, with a weight of 16.02 kg and a range of 6,900 m, intended for training.

== Operational history ==
The mortar system was spotted in Ukraine in December 2023 in the ongoing Russian invasion of Ukraine.

== Technical and tactical data ==
- Caliber – 120 mm
- Number of barrels – 1
- Ammunition capacity – 46 rounds
- Maximum range – 12,000 m
- Time to be ready to fire – 30 s
- Time to leave the firing position – 15 s

== Operators ==
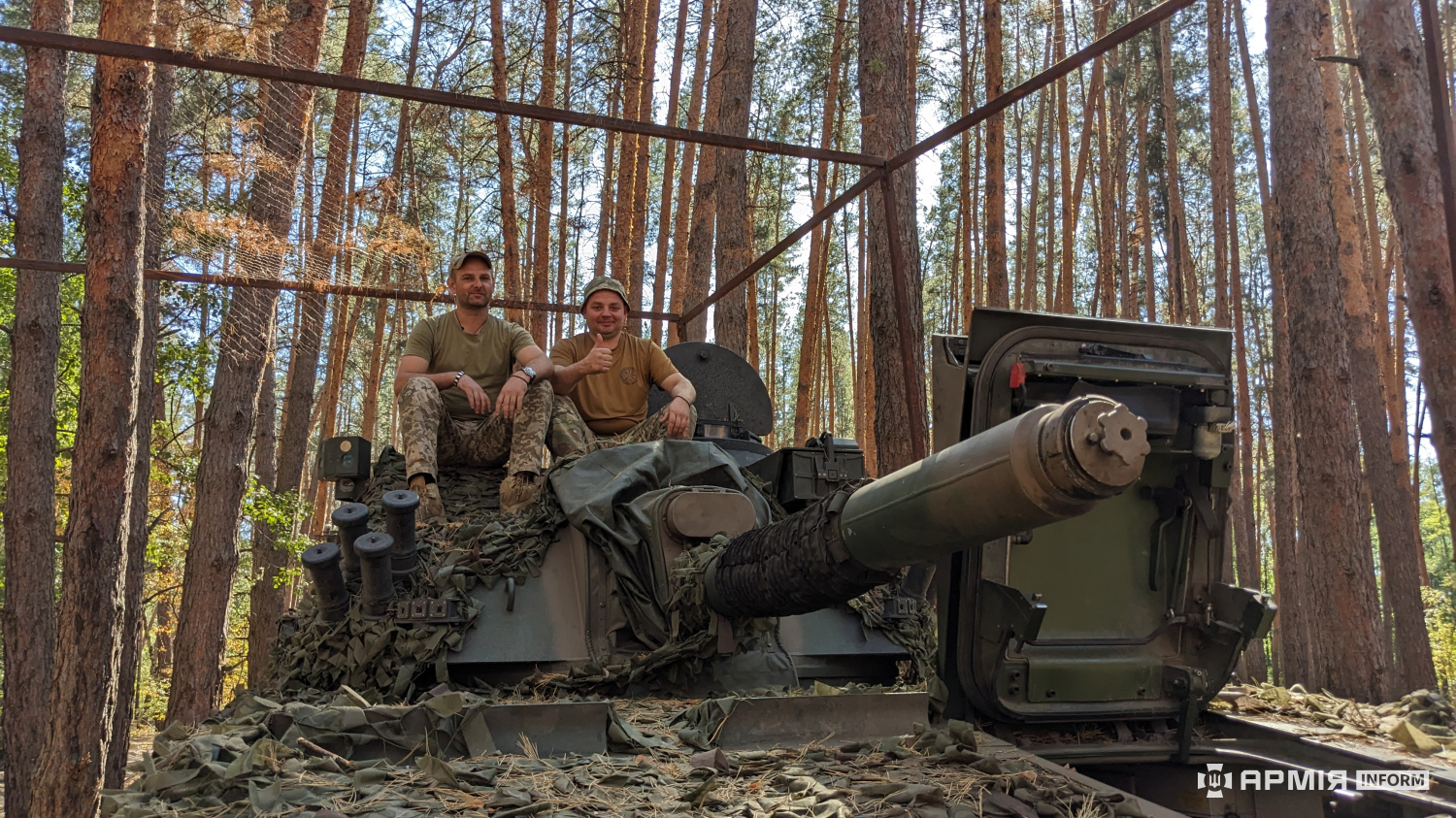
Rak Self-Propelled Mortar of the Ukrainian 44th Mechanized Brigade

Poland – 124
Ukraine – At least 24 vehicles were pledged by Poland in March 2023. At least 2 were destroyed by 7 November 2025.

== See also ==
- 2S9 Nona – (Soviet Union)
- AMOS – (Finland)
- Patria NEMO – (Finland)
- Light-weight combat vehicle – (Japan) (LCV)
