= AMOS =

Patria AMOS
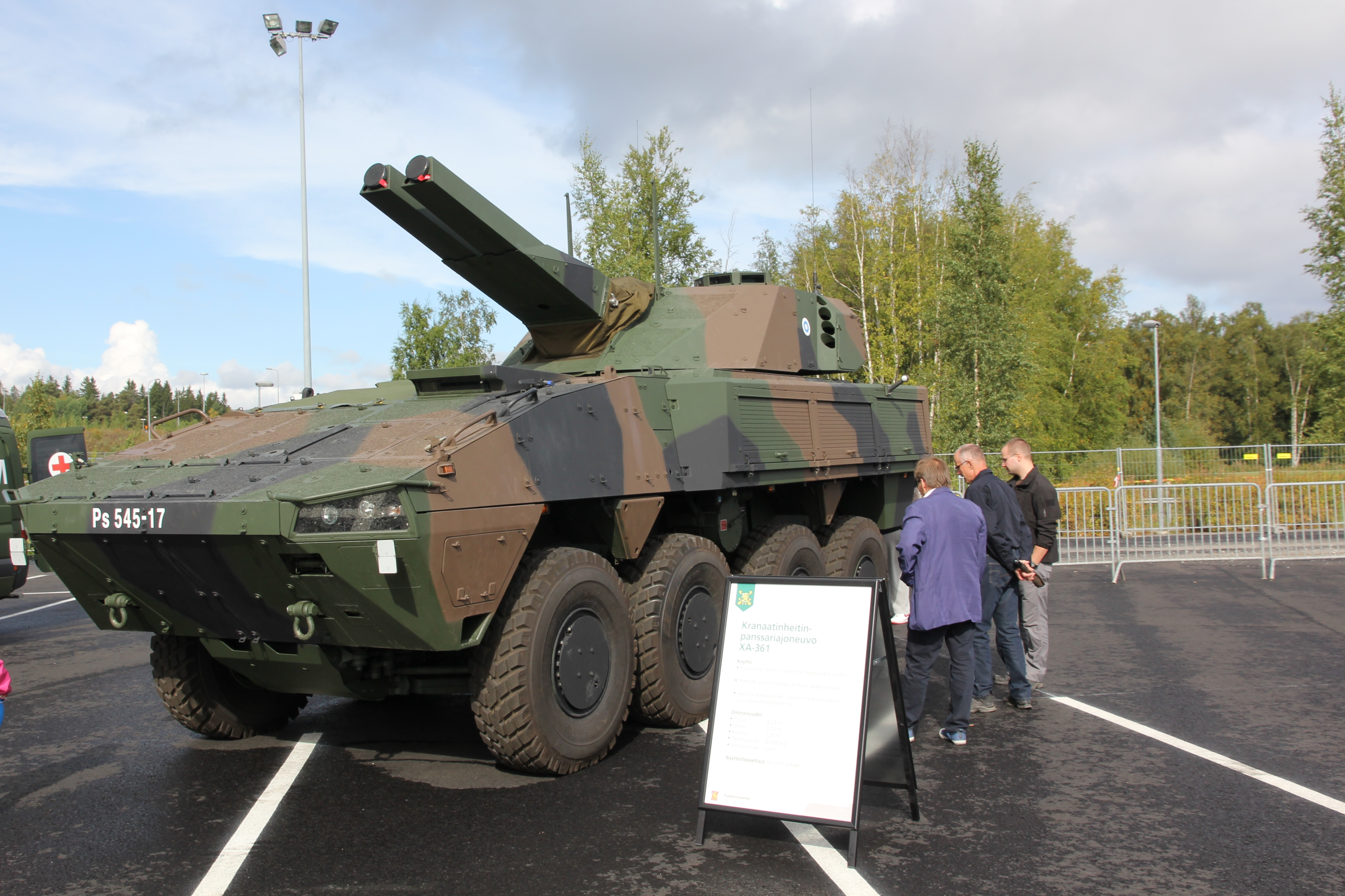
- Finnish Patria XA-361 AMV with AMOS mortar turret, designated 120 KrhPsAjon XA361
- Type: Twin-barrel, self-loading mortar system
- Place of origin: Finland/Sweden

Service history
- In service: 2007
- Used by: Finnish Army

Production history
- Designer: 50 % Patria Vammas Oy; 50 % Alvis Hägglunds AB
- Designed: 1994–2006
- Manufacturer: Patria Hägglunds Oy

Specifications
- Mass: 4,445 kg (9,800 lb)(turret only)
- Barrel length: 3,000 mm (9 ft 10 in) L/25
- Crew: 1+3 (vehicle-fit, 2 in turret)
- Shell: Standard mortar smoothbore + stub case or smart guided ammunition. Typically HE
- Caliber: 2 × 120 millimetres (4.72 in) smoothbore
- Barrels: 2
- Breech: yes
- Recoil: hydro-pneumatic suspension
- Carriage: 48 rds
- Elevation: −3° to +85°, electrical/manual
- Traverse: ± 360°, electrical/manual
- Rate of fire: 16 rds/min maximum 12 rds/min sustained
- Effective firing range: 6–10 km (3.7–6.2 mi) (ammo dependent)
- Maximum firing range: 10 km (6.2 mi) (indirect fire); 150–1,550 m (0.093–0.963 mi) (direct fire)

The Advanced Mortar System (AMOS), or SSG120 (Swedish: splitterskyddad Granatkastare 120 mm, "fragmentation protected mortar") in Swedish system-development, is semi-automatic twin barrelled, breech loaded mortar turret. AMOS has been fitted to a wide range of armoured vehicles, such as the Sisu Pasi, Patria AMV and Combat Vehicle 90. The Swedish Navy originally planned to fit AMOS to the CB90 assault craft, but found that it was too small to carry it. Instead, a project to develop the larger Combat Boat 2010 was launched specifically to carry AMOS. Sweden cancelled its acquisition of the AMOS in 2009 due to budget regulations by recommendations from Genomförandegruppen. In 2016 a new self propelled mortar system called Mjölner based on a CV90 hull was ordered by the Swedish armed forces, it is based on the AMOS and has many visual similarities but is not as advanced.

== Design ==
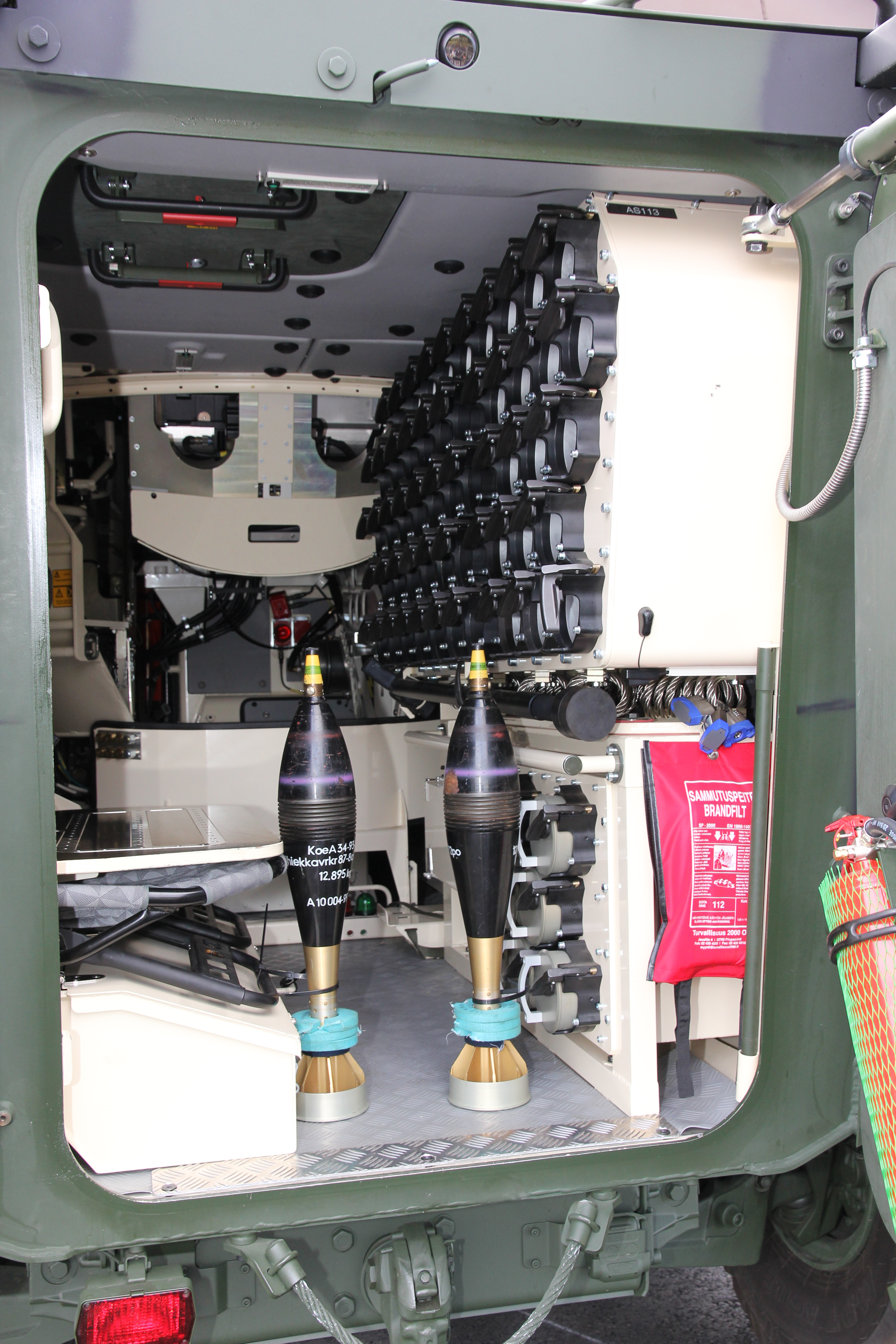
AMOS ammunition storage compartment

When fitted to a vehicle, both GPS- and inertia positioning are used. The electronic fire-control system utilizes digital maps. The twin barreled AMOS is able to keep up rate of fire of 12 rounds per minute. Using its computer-controlled Multiple round simultaneous impact (MRSI) feature it is possible to set up a burst of up to 10 rounds that hit the target simultaneously. The first rounds are fired at higher angles with more propellant so that the rounds fly in a high arc. The next rounds are shot later with a slightly smaller angle and less propellant so that they fly a lower arc to the same target. This can be done seven times in a row, always adjusting the angle and power. The adjustment between shots is done by a computer. The strike of one AMOS unit roughly equals one strike of an artillery battery.

An AMOS turret has a full 360-degree field of fire at elevations of −3 to +85 degrees. AMOS is capable of both conventional indirect fire and direct fire for self-protection. In a typical installation, mounted on a Patria AMV or a similar vehicle, the vehicle can dash to the next position roughly 30 seconds after initiating the 14-round salvo, leaving minimal time for detection and counter-attack by enemy; evasion is the primary means of self-protection.

AMOS is manufactured and marketed by Finnish/Swedish Patria Hägglunds, a joint venture between Finnish Patria and Swedish BAE Systems Hägglunds. The system was known as the SSG120 in Swedish development. Ammunition for AMOS includes the Strix guided round and a modification of the Spanish Instalaza MAT-120 120 mm Mortar Cargo Round (although the latter is restricted from the Finnish inventory because of Finnish partnership in the Ottawa Treaty abolishing landmines). AMOS is capable of firing standard muzzle-loaded mortar rounds, but due to the breech-load design in the AMOS, the rounds have to be equipped with a short stub case at the base of the fins, similar to a sabot. When the round is fired, the case exits the breech system automatically.

== Operators ==
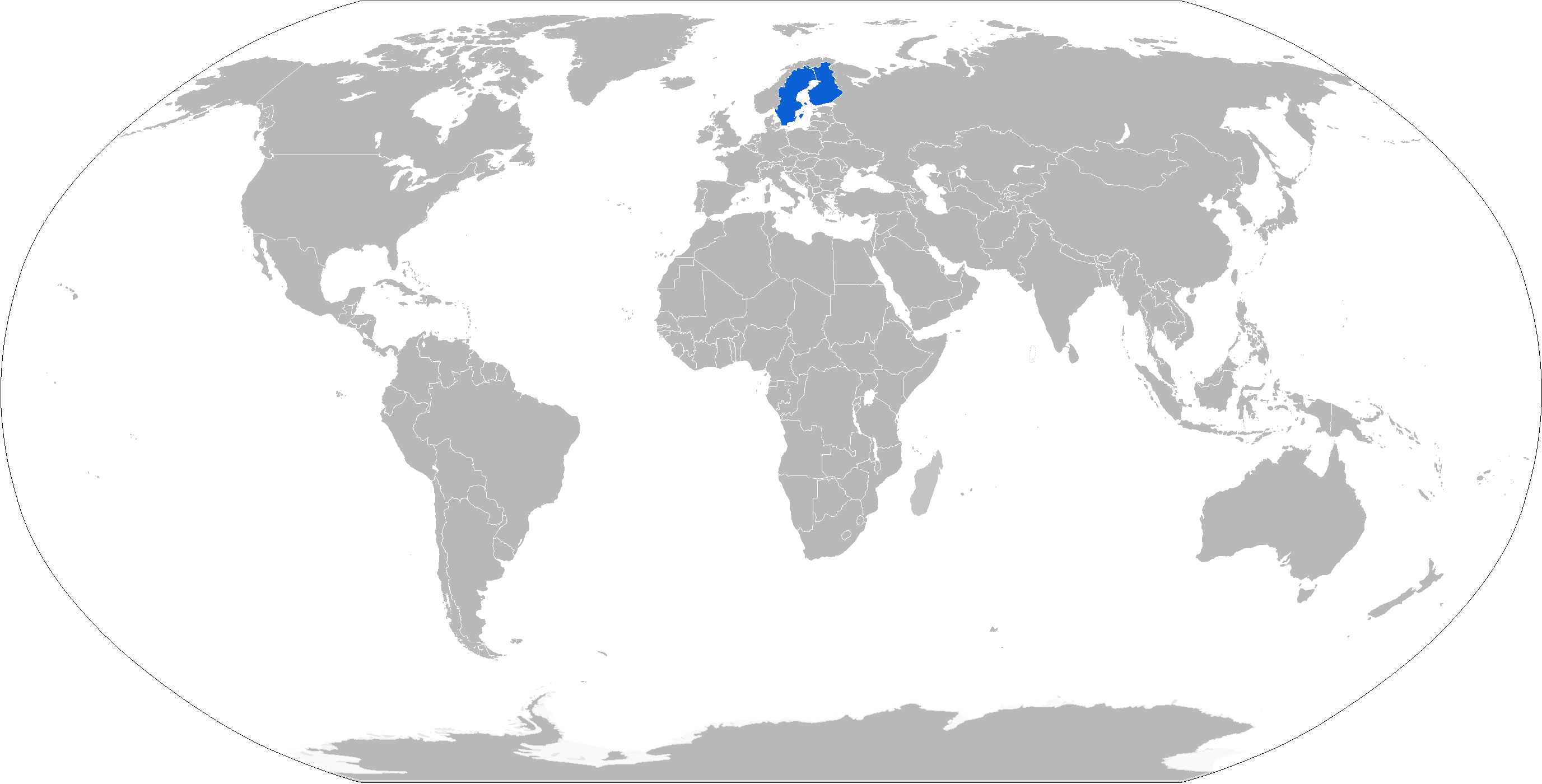
Map of AMOS operators in blue

=== Current operators ===
- Finland
  - 18 AMOS ordered in 2010 for fitment to Patria AMV "XA-361" chassis (120 kranaatinheitinpanssariajoneuvo (KrhPsAjon) XA361, "armored mortar vehicle"), delivered from 2013, all in service

=== Potential orders ===
- Czech Republic
  - The Army is looking for 62 self-propelled mortars, capable of indirect, semi-direct and direct fire and most likely on the 8x8 Pandur II. The competitors are the Patria NEMO and the M120 Rak. The NEMO is the favorite.

=== Cancelled orders ===
- Finland
  - 6 AMOS were in the end not ordered as 24 were initially ordered, but only 18 were purchased and supplied.
- Sweden
  - Swedish Army 40 AMOS was cancelled in 2009 due to financial reasons. It was expected to be installed on the CV90 (granatkastarpansarbandvagn (grkpbv) 90120, "mortar armored tracked motor carriage"). In 2016, the Mjölner was selected to take over the role of the AMOS. 80 Mjölner turrets have been ordered so far.
  - Swedish Navy The AMOS purchase was cancelled in 2009 after studies finding out that fitting it to the Combat Boat 2010 was too expensive. Initially, the CB90 was the platform planned, but it was discovered to be too small to carry the AMOS in practice (after testing with a fully functional prototype). In 2023, Sweden decided to manufacture such a ship, but with the Patria Nemo as a turret, 8 were ordered.

== See also ==
- Patria NEMO – (Finland)
- Light-weight combat vehicle – (Japan)
- M120 Rak – (Poland)
