= List of equipment of the Belgian Army =

This is a list of the equipment used by the Belgian Army and Belgian Medical Service.

== Individual equipment ==
=== Camouflage pattern ===
Model	Image	Origin	Pattern type	Environment	Notes
MultiCam		United States	Disruptive pattern camouflage / woodland	Universal	Standard issued camouflage have been entering service since 2022 in the Belgian Armed Forces (except for the Belgian Navy). The MultiCam was already in service since 2016 with the Special Forces Group.
Jigsaw		Belgium	Jigsaw	Temperate / central Europe	Third variant, the M1999, of the Jigsaw pattern that entered service in 1999. Fourth iteration, the M2005, that entered service around 2005, the white bits were removed. Being phased out of the active forces, but is still used with some accessories.
Jigsaw		Belgium	Jigsaw	Arid / desert	Reused Jigsaw pattern, and entered in service in the Belgian contingent in Afghanistan (ISAF). Phased out of the active forces, but is still used with some accessories.
M19 (NFP-Navy)		Netherlands	Flecktarn	Naval	The Belgian Navy selected the M19 (NFP-Navy), the same camouflage as the Royal Netherlands Navy.

=== Clothing ===
Model	Images	Origin	Type	Notes
G4 Combat Gear	–	Belgium; United States	Field uniforms	The SSC Consortium (Sioen, Seyntex, Crye Precision) was selected in 2022 to provide the new combat gears of the Belgian Land Component for the following 15 years, worth €410 million. The purchase includes: Clothing (compatible and integrated multilayer system), with male and female specific variants; Planned future purchases: Wool underwear (anti-bacterial properties); Rain gears; CBRN protection (clothing / mask); Ballistic vest; Helmets; Backpacks

=== Other equipment ===
Model	Images	Origin	Type	Notes
Combat helmet
Ops-Core FAST		United States	Combat helmet	8,650 ordered in 2020.
Hazmat
M50 / M51 JSGPM		United Kingdom; United States	Protective mask	Adopted by the Belgian Army
Night Vision
THEON MIKRON BNVD		Greece; Germany	Night vision	8,509 ordered by Belgium as of December 2024.

== Weapons ==
=== Small arms ===
Model	Images	Origin	Type	Calibre	Notes
Handguns
FN Five-seven mk2		Belgium	Semi-automatic pistol	FN 5.7×28mm NATO	Standard issue sidearm, ordered in 2014 in replacement of the Browning GP. Initial contract for 12,065 pistols
Glock 19		Austria	Semi-automatic pistol	9×19mm Parabellum	Used by: SOBU (Special Operations Boat Unit); SOED (Special operations engineer detachment); DAS (Détachement d’Agents de Sécurité).
Submachine guns
FN P90		Belgium	PDW	FN 5.7×28mm NATO	Personal defence weapon used by medical personnel and SFG - Special Operations Boat Unit. Initial contract in 2014 for 865 P90.
B&T MP9-N		Switzerland	Submachine gun	9×19mm Parabellum	Used by the DAS (Détachement d’Agents de Sécurité).
Rifles
FN F2000		Belgium	Bullpup assault rifle	5.56×45mm NATO	Used by SOR Pathfinders in limited quantities to serve alongside the FN SCAR.
FN FNC M2		Belgium	Assault rifle	5.56×45mm NATO	Still in use as a secondary rifle for training.
FN FNC M3		Belgium	Carbine	5.56×45mm NATO	Still in use as a secondary rifle for training.
FN SCAR-L (STD)		Belgium	Assault rifle	5.56×45mm NATO	Standard issue assault rifle for the Belgian army. SCAR-L MK2 in use as the new standard service rifle for all combat units. Older SCAR-L MK1 are transferred to support units to replace the FN FNC.
FN SCAR-L (CQC)		Belgium	Carbine	5.56×45mm NATO	Standard issue assault rifle for the Belgian army. SCAR-L MK2 in use as the new standard service rifle for all combat units. Older SCAR-L MK1 are transferred to support units to replace the FN FNC.
FN SCAR-H (CQC)		Belgium	Battle rifle	7.62×51mm NATO	63 SCAR-H CQC ordered for special forces combat divers.
Precision rifles
FN SCAR-H PR/ FN SCAR-H TPR/MK20 SSR		Belgium	DMR	7.62×51mm NATO	287 SCAR-H PR rifles. MK20 SSR used by the Belgian Military after the US Military adopts it.
Accuracy International AX338		United Kingdom	Bolt action sniper rifle	8.6×70mm	
Barrett M107A1		United States	Anti materiel sniper rifle	12.7×99mm NATO	59 delivered by the end of 2014.
Machine guns
FN EVOLYS		Belgium	Ultra LMG	5.56×45mm NATO / 7.62×51mm NATO	20 ordered for evaluation.
FN Minimi 5.56 Mk3 Tactical SB		Belgium	LMG	5.56×45mm NATO	Standard issue LMG. Currently being updated to 'Mk3 Tactical SB' standards, featuring a shorter barrel, adjustable buttstock with shoulder rest, ergonomic railed handguard, new bipod assembly and cocking handle.
FN Minimi 7.62 Mk3		Belgium	LMG	7.62×51mm NATO	The Belgian government signed a 2 million euro contract to replace all man portable MAG's with 242 Minimi's chambered in 7.62×51mm.
FN MAG		Belgium	GPMG	7.62×51mm NATO	Standard general-purpose machine gun. To be replaced with 242 7.62×51mm chambered Minimi's. Stay in use only as vehicle mounted machine gun.
M2HB QCB		United States; Belgium	HMG	12.7×99mm NATO	Standard issue heavy machine gun. Built by FN Herstal.
Shotguns
Remington Model 870		United States	Pump action shotgun	12 gauge	In service since 2008.
Benelli M4		Italy	Semi-automatic combat shotgun	12-gauge	Adopted on November 17, 2023, for counter-UAS operations by the Belgian Air Force.
Grenade launchers
FN40GL		Belgium	Under barrel grenade launcher	40×46mm LV	Used by special forces mounted under FN SCAR rifles. 507 on order to replace the F2000 on a squad based level.
Heckler & Koch GMG		Belgium	AGL	40×53mm HV	Mounted on the army's Jankel FOX Rapid Reaction Vehicles.
Grenades
Mecar M72 HE		Belgium	Hand grenade	N/A	Fragmentation hand grenade.
M18		United States	Smoke Grenade	N/A	Smoke hand grenade.
Miscellaneous
HAFLA		Germany	Hand-held flame-cartridge	N/A	Single-shot, disposable incendiary weapon.

=== Anti-tank weapons ===
Model	Images	Origin	Type	Calibre	Notes
Unguided anti-tank / material weapons
M72 LAW		Norway; United States	Light rocket launcher	66 mm	Standard short-range AT weapon on a squad based level.
RGW 90 HH		Germany	Recoilless guns	90 mm	Supplements the M72 LAW as the medium-range AT weapon on a squad based level. Orders: 111 RGW90 AS in 2013; 509 RGW90 AS in 2016; 390 in 2018; 1450 delivered in 2020.; 4002 ordered in 2022
Anti tank guided missiles
Spike-LR		Israel; Germany	ATGM	130 mm	66 anti-tank missile systems are currently in use. Replaced the army's older MILAN ATGM. Will be replaced by the French Akeron MP. Will remain in service until 2030.
Land mines
M6A2 Mine	–	United States	Anti-tank Landmine	N/A	Anti-tank mine

== Indirect fire ==
=== Artillery cannon ===
Model	Images	Origin	Type	Calibre	Quantity	Notes
GIAT LG1 - Mark II		France	Towed howitzer	105 mm L/30	14	14 ordered in 1996, delivered in 1997. As of 2024, 14 remain in use.

=== Mortars ===
Model	Images	Origin	Type	Calibre	Quantity	Notes
Mortars
Expal M-08		Spain	Light infantry mortar	60 mm	65	The variant selected has an asymmetric bipode. 126 purchased (69 delivered in 2012, 57 delivered in 2013) As of 2020, 65 remain in service.
Expal 81 MX2-KM		Spain	Mortar	81 mm	14	Mortars ordered in 2016 to Expal to replace the M1 Mortar. The contract amounted to €3.7 million. Used by: 6 for the 2nd Commando Battalion; 6 for the 3rd Paratroopers Battalion; 2 for the Stockem Technical Department for the training
Mo-120 RT Mortier 120 mm Rayé Tracté		France	Heavy mortar	120 mm	28	As of 2024, 28 remain in service. 32 were in service the previous years, 4 were donated to Ukraine in November 2022. To be replaced by the Griffon MEPAC (VBMR equipped with the 2R2M mortar system).
Ammunition
Mecar 120 mm ammunition	–	Belgium	Heavy mortar shells	120 mm	–	Mecar (KNDS Belgium) produces 120 mm mortar shells for the Belgian Army.

== Vehicles ==
=== Armoured vehicles ===
Model	Images	Origin	Type	Quantity	Notes
Armoured fighting vehicle
Piranha IIIC APC		Switzerland	APC	64	Will be replaced by the VBMR Griffon from 2025 Belgium converted to an all-wheeled force, and replaced their Leopard 1s with 242 Piranha IIIC in 7 variants.(138 vehicles from first fixed batch delivered,second and final batch cancelled) These numbers include the second cancelled batch: 99 FUS APC; 32 DF30 fire support version with MK44 Bushmaster II in an ORCWS-30; 18 DF90 fire support version with a 90 mm cannon; 24 command post serving as a mobile command post; 17 repair and recovery variants; 18 engineer variants; 12 ambulances; In 2025, a total of 127 Piranha armed vehicles are in service, primarily within the army, with some also deployed in the medical service.
Piranha IIIC - DF30		Switzerland	IFV	19	
Piranha IIIC - DF90		Switzerland	Assault gun	18	
Piranha IIIC - AEV		Switzerland	AEV	8	
Piranha IIIC - ARV		Switzerland	ARV	9	
Piranha IIIC - Ambulance		Switzerland	Armoured Ambulance	6	
Piranha IIIC - C2		Switzerland	Armoured command post	14	
EBRC Jaguar		France	AFV / Reconnaissance	1 (+59 to be delivered)	60 vehicles ordered to replace the Piranha DF30 & DF90. The contract was signed in July 2019, for a delivery starting in 2025. The first delivery took place in November 2026. The 1st/3rd Lancers and 2nd/4th Lancers battalions will receive 30 Jaguars each.
Multirole armoured vehicle
VBMR Griffon	VBMR_Griffon	France	APC	> 60 (474 ordered in total)	Ordered through the belgian and french CaMo partnership. Griffons will replace Pandur I and ATF Dingo 2 MPPV vehicles as a multirole armoured vehicle. Orders: 382 in 2022 as part of the CaMo 1 phase.; 92 as part of the CaMo 3 phase.; Variants ordered: VTT - Armoured personnel carrier; SAN - Medical Evacuation (35); EPC/VOA - Forward observer & Command and control.; Genie variant - Combat engineering and recovery.; The vehicles are assembled in Belgium via Mol Cy, a belgian company. First vehicles delivered in July 2025. Note: the MEPAC variant is included in the Indirect Fire section.
Armoured personnel carriers
Pandur I		Austria	APC	31	44 vehicles went through a mid-life update to extend the service-life until 2035, the vehicle received a ballistic armour upgrade, mine protection, Slat armour, a 12.7mm remote weapon station and an engine upgrade.: 39 reconnaissance variants; 9 ambulance variants; 4 maintenance variants; Between 1996 and 1998, 60 examples were built under license in Belgium. 7 were sold to Austria in 2016 (6 reconnaissance variants, 1 ambulance) In 2025 only 31 are operational.
Infantry mobility vehicle
ATF Dingo 2 MPPV		Germany	IMV, MRAP	218	Will be replaced by the VBMR Griffon from 2025. 2 vehicles destroyed by IED in Mali in 2019.: 156 FUS variants for troop transport; 52 command post; 10 ambulance variants
LMV Lynx		Italy	IMV, MRAP	80	~ 360 sent to Ukraine.
Oshkosh CLV Falcon		United States	IMV, MRAP	322	322 vehicles ordered to replace the Iveco LMV as the new command and liaison vehicle. Named CLV 'Falcon' in Belgian service. First deliveries will arrive in 2023 until 2024. The first units were delivered in January 2024 and are now in use with the IStar Battalion.: 135 vehicles armed with FN DeFNder light RWS armed with a 7.62mm machine gun; 22 ambulance variants

=== Unarmoured fighting vehicles ===
Model	Images	Origin	Type	Quantity	Notes
Special operations regiment
Jankel FOX RRV "Rapid Reaction Vehicle"		United Kingdom; Japan	Light rapid response vehicle - SOF	108	Contract for 108 RRV signed in January 2016, introduced in July 2017. The vehicle is based on the Toyota Hilux chassis. It is equipped with a 360° ring-mount and pintle mounts for machine guns and automatic grenade launchers. Protection: 38 modular kits for up to STANAG 4569 Level 1 against small arms and shell splinters. It also has a belly plate with some IED protection.
NP Aerospace - Jankel WOLF LTTV Light Tactical Transport Vehicles		United Kingdom; Germany	Light troop transport vehicle - SOF	112 (+ remaining 87 delivered by end of 2026)	Contract in April 2018 for 199 LTTV, the deliveries began in 2018. In 2024, Jankel went bankrupt. The assets were taken over by NP Aerospace, and the contract for the remaining 87 vehicles to be produced was signed in December 2024. The LTTV is based on the Mercedes-Benz UNIMOG U5000. It succeeds to the UNIMOG 1350 of the SFG and paracommando units. The LTTV features a removable mission modules: 27 special forces modules, 140 troop transport modules. 8 ambulance body modules, 24 logistics modules. The equipment includes an integrated suite of military sub-systems: a removable ballistic protection kit, a Roll-Over-Protection-System (ROPS), weapon mounts and communications fit.
Achleitner Toyota Landcruiser 200		Austria; Japan	Civilian armoured vehicles	42	
Specialised vehicles
Mercedes-Benz Unimog U1350L Unimog 1.9T 4×4		West Germany; Germany	Light truck	61	In service since 1995 in the Belgian Army.: 10 JACAM: In service since 2010, transformed from the transport variant; 4 SVB: Surveillance trucks, equipped with an EL/M-2130A battlefield surveillance radar.; 47 Mistral: SHORAD trucks.; Replacement ongoing with the DAF 4×4 and the Jankel WOLF LTTV.

=== Logistics vehicles ===
Model	Images	Origin	Type	Quantity	Notes
Transport vehicles
DAF CF Military 4×4		Czech Republic; Netherlands	Light truck	636	636 4×4 ordered in December 2020 for general transport tasks. First delivery in December 2022. It includes: 410 for 10-foot containers with a HIAB hoolift system; 174 flatbed trucks with tarpaulin produced by Porgest; 52 flatbed trucks with tarpaulin (by Porgest) and a crane (by HIAB); Vehicles based on Tatra chassis, using a PACCAR MX-11 engine (410 hp). 352 ballistic cabs for the 4×4 and 8×8 trucks.
DAF CF Military 8×8		Czech Republic; Netherlands	Heavy truck	243	226 8×8 ordered in December 2020 for general transport tasks. First delivery in December 2022. It includes: 171 for 15-foot containers with a HIAB hoolift system; 52 flatbed trucks; 20 tipper trucks (tipper system by VS-Mont); Vehicles based on Tatra chassis, using a PACCAR MX-13 engine (460 hp). 352 ballistic cabs for the 4×4 and 8×8 trucks.
Iveco EuroTrakker MP 41OE 44H ALC 8×4 Autonomous load carrier		Italy	Hooklift truck	148	In service since 2004. Replacement ongoing with the DAF 8×8.
Iveco M250.45W		Italy	Medium heavy truck	400	400 ordered in 2003 to succeed to the MAN 11.136 H/HA 4×4, deliveries starting in 2005. Variants: trucks with hooklift system for 15-foot containers; trucks with tarpaulin; trucks for troop transport (20 passengers); Truck with a 8-ton capacity, and 350 ballistic protection kits. Replacement ongoing with the DAF 8×8.
Semi-truck
Mercedes-Benz Actros 6×4		Germany	Semi-truck	60	In service since 2002. Variants purchased: 2643 LS; 2643 LS 980 LT; 2643 LS high coupling; 4 semi-trailer types: Broshuis E2190-27 for engineering equipment transport; Van Hool 2×20 ft (container transport); Van Hool 20 tons (covered); Van Hool Thermo King, refrigerated trailer; Replacement ongoing with the DAF 8×8.
DAF CF 8×8 PEV Protected evacuation vehicle	–	Czech Republic; Netherlands	Armoured heavy transport truck	22	Combination 8×8 tractor with an armoured cabin and a Broshuis semi-trailer (3-axle, flatbed, extendable). Orders: 9 in December 2021; 13 in July 2025
Scania T144		Sweden	Heavy transport truck	16	In service since 2000. 26 purchased, Partial sale of 10 trucks to Finland in 2017, 16 remain in service as of 2025. The Scania T144 is towing a 6-axle Lohr tank-transport trailer. Replacement ongoing with the DAF CF 8×8 PEV.
Handling equipment
Climax Forklift		United Kingdom	military forklift	–	Used by 29th Logistic Battalion.

=== Miscellaneous Vehicles ===
Model	Images	Origin	Type	Quantity	Notes
All-terrain vehicles
JCB Groundhog		United Kingdom	ATV	38	In service since 2009.
M-Gator		United States	Military light utility vehicle	–	Used for medical evacuation.
Polaris MRZR D4		United States	Buggy	93	In service with the Special Operations Forces Regiment. The parliament approved the purchase of 93 buggies in December 2025. Deliveries in 2026.
Utility vehicles
Ford Ranger		Mexico; United States	Pick-up	99 (+ 11 on order)	The Ford Ranger XLT and the Volkswagen Tiguan Life are the new 4x4 vehicles for Defense. They replace the current 4x4 fleet of 132 KIA Sportage and 50 Volkswagen Amarok.
Volkswagen Tiguan		Germany	Sports utility vehicle	30 (+ 67 on order)	The Ford Ranger XLT and the Volkswagen Tiguan Life are the new 4x4 vehicles for Defense. They replace the current 4x4 fleet of 132 KIA Sportage and 50 Volkswagen Amarok.
Medical
BIONEAR		Belgium	Mobile lab	1 (+ 2 on order)	A total order of three fully-equipped vehicles was placed, two of which were donated to Ukrainian Armed Forces in an effort to offer medical support to patients, hit by the war.

== Engineering equipment ==
=== Bridging equipment ===
Model	Images	Origin	Type	Quantity	Notes
Leopard 1 Leguan		Germany	AVLB	–	Originally 9, all in reserve & mothballed by 11th Engineer Battalion (Belgium).

=== Recovery vehicles ===
Model	Images	Origin	Type	Quantity	Notes
Soframe CRV Taurus "Combat recovery vehicle"		France; Germany	ARV	15	System specifications: Mercedes-Benz Arocs 8×8, 30 tons; Crew: 3 soldiers; Passive protection, ballistic and anti mine armour, CBRN protection; Active protection: deFNder Light RCWS (with FN MAG machine gun and Rheinmetall ROSY 3×2×5EA smoke grenade discharger) and jamming system available, Towing arm with 12 to 7 tons capacity at 2.3 meters; Main winch: 20 tons capacity; It replaces the Volvo Manumat, and is replacing the Renault Kerax.
Soframe PRV Aurus "Protected recovery vehicle"		France; Germany	ARV	13	System specifications: Mercedes-Benz Arocs 8×8, 35 tons; Crew: 3 soldiers; Passive protection, ballistic and anti mine armour, CBRN protection; Active protection: deFNder Light RCWS (with FN MAG machine gun and Rheinmetall ROSY 3×2×5EA smoke grenade discharger) and jamming system available; Crane: Miller with 13 tons capacity; Towing arm with 12 to 7 tons capacity at 2.3 meters; Main winch: 20 tons capacity; It replaces the Volvo Manumat, and is replacing the Renault Kerax.
Renault Kerax		France	Recovery vehicle	27	In service since 2001, being replaced by the Soframe CRV and PRV. System specifications: Renault Kerax 8×8; Crew: 5 soldiers; Unarmoured and unarmed; Crane: Palfinger, with 20 tons of maximal capacity, and 6.35 tons at full length; Towing arm with 20 tons of maximal capacity, and 8 tons at 2.9 meters.; Main winch: 19.9 tons capacity

=== Engineering machines ===
Model	Images	Origin	Type	Quantity	Notes
JCB HMEE		United Kingdom	AEV	4	First vehicles arrived in 2022.
Leopard 1 AEV		West Germany	AEV	–	Originally 17, currently unknown. Still in use in 2025 by the 4th Engineer Battalion.

== Reconnaissance and surveillance equipment ==
Model	Images	Origin	Type	Quantity	Notes
Thales Squire Block 2		Netherlands	Man-portable ground surveillance radar	9	Purchased in 2018 to succeed to the EL-1205. Used by Jagers te Paard Battalion.

== Unmanned aerial vehicles ==
Model	Images	Origin	Type	Role	Quantity of UAV	Notes
Insitu X-300 (US Navy designation: Boeing RQ-21 Blackjack)		United States	UAV, fixed-wing	ISTAR	4 (2 × 2)	2 systems ordered by the Belgian Army, in March 2021 with Luxembourg (2) and the Netherlands (3). Composition of the system for Belgium: 2 drones; 1 launcher; 1 command and control station; 1 data analysis station; 1 "skyhook" to recover it; 1 simulator
AeroVironment RQ-20 Puma LE Long endurance		United States	UAV, fixed-wing	ISR	8 (2 × 4)	4 systems RQ-20 Puma LE ordered in 2020, delivered in 2021. Each system is made of 2 drones and 1 Crysalis control station. Notes: some were leased temporarily from the US Army in 2017 during the Belgian mission in Iraq against ISIS.; 8 additional systems RQ 20 Puma LE were planned to be purchased by 2025, the status of this programme is unclear.
AeroVironment RQ-11 Raven		United States	UAV, fixed-wing	ISR	24 (8 × 3)	8 systems RQ-11 acquired in December 2016. Each system is made of 3 drones and 1 control station.

== Air defence ==
=== Short range air defence ===
Model	Images	Origin	Type	Quantity	Notes
Piorun		Poland	MANPADS launcher	40	Letter of intent for the Piorun signed in May 2025 to purchase 200 to 300 Piorun missiles for the Special Operations Regiment. Order signed in July 2025 worth €137 million for hundreds of missiles with 40 launchers. The first units arrived in December 2025.
Piorun		Poland	MANPADS missile	Hundreds	Letter of intent for the Piorun signed in May 2025 to purchase 200 to 300 Piorun missiles for the Special Operations Regiment. Order signed in July 2025 worth €137 million for hundreds of missiles with 40 launchers. The first units arrived in December 2025.

=== Anti-drone weapons ===
Model	Images	Origin	Type	Notes
Portable anti-drone weapon
DroneGun Tactical	–	Australia	Handheld RF jammer	The DroneGun Tactical and SkyWall Patrol systems were both visibly deployed by the Belgian Federal Police during high-profile international events such as the 2021 NATO Summit in Brussels, where they were used as part of the layered counter-UAV defense strategy protecting visiting dignitaries, including the President of the United States. Photographs and video clips of soldiers of the Belgian army carrying these systems circulated on social media.
Skywall Patrol		United Kingdom	Anti-drone capture system	The DroneGun Tactical and SkyWall Patrol systems were both visibly deployed by the Belgian Federal Police during high-profile international events such as the 2021 NATO Summit in Brussels, where they were used as part of the layered counter-UAV defense strategy protecting visiting dignitaries, including the President of the United States. Photographs and video clips of soldiers of the Belgian army carrying these systems circulated on social media.

== Intervention and emergency equipment ==
=== Fire vehicles ===
Model	Images	Origin	Type	Quantity	Notes
Renault D14 280E6 CCF 4×4	(illustration)	France	Wildfire engine	1	Vehicle used at the Elsenborn military range. It is maintained by Fire Technics.

=== Explosive ordnance disposal ===
Equipment operated by the Explosive Ordnance Disposal and Destruction Service (known in Flemish as the DOVO, Dienst voor Opruiming en Vernietiging van Ontploffingstuigen).

Model	Images	Origin	Type	Role	Quantity	Notes
SEDEE / DOVO Intervention vehicles
TT URO K6-26.16 Todo Terreno		Spain	Off-road truck with crane	–	Unknown	Vehicle supplied by TT URO Special. It is equipped with: Truck mounted crane: HIAB X-HiDuo 138; Winch
Iveco Daily (3rd gen - Daily VI 70C18 4×4)		Italy; Belgium	Off-road capable, 7-tons van	–	6	Modified by Cammaert Trucks.
Mercedes-Benz Sprinter (2nd generation, NCV3)		Germany	Utility van	–	4	4 purchased in 2013.
Mercedes-Benz Sprinter (2nd generation facelift)		Germany	Utility van	–	Unknown	Latest variant, equipped with a winch.
Volkswagen Transporter (T6 gen)		Germany	Utility van	–	Unknown	
Ford Ranger XLT (T6 gen - 1st facelift)		Mexico; United States	Pickup vehicle	–	Unknown	
Ford Ranger XLT (T6 gen - 1st facelift)	–	Mexico; United States	Pickup vehicle	–	Unknown	Second variant, with a special cabin for robots and equipment, equipped with a winch.
Protection equipment
Med-Eng EOD-9N		Canada	Bomb suit	–	Unknown	
EOD robots
Exail Cameleon LG -E UGV	–	France	Mini tracked UGV	Demining / EOD	8	Robot ordered in 2024, it is used now by the Belgian Combat Engineers and the Engineering School. The robot is equipped with a manipulator arm.
Foster-Miller TALON (engineer variant)		United States	Mini tracked UGV	Demining / EOD	Unknown	Part of the 3 robot types purchased in 2017 for €5 million.
iRobot PackBot 510 EOD		United States	Mini tracked UGV	Demining / EOD	Unknown	Part of the 3 robot types purchased in 2017 for €5 million.
Telerob Telemax		Germany	Mini tracked UGV	Demining / EOD	Unknown	Part of the 3 robot types purchased in 2017 for €5 million.
Telerob tEODor I		Germany	Mini tracked UGV	Demining / EOD	3	Ordered in the 2000s.
Telerob tEODor II	2	Germany	Mini tracked UGV	Demining / EOD		Ordered in the 2000s.
Telerob tEODor III	6	Germany	Mini tracked UGV	Demining / EOD		Ordered in the 2000s.
Neutralisation systems
RE70 M3+ (Chemring Group)		United Kingdom	Non-recoiling disruptor system	Bomb disposal	Unknown	Used to neutralise IED. explosive systems and ammunition.
BREACH MC (Chemring Group)		United Kingdom	VHF / UHF initiator	Bomb disposal	Unknown	Used to neutralise IED. explosive systems and ammunition.

== Research projects ==
=== Unmanned ground vehicle ===
Model	Images	Origin	Type	Role	Quantity of UAV	Notes
Milrem THeMIS Tracked Hybrid Modular Infantry System		Estonia	Tracked UGV	Multirole / R&D	Unknown	Robot used for a R&D programme known as iMUGS (Integrated modular unmanned ground system). The programme is under Estonian coordination, it is financed by PESCO, and other European countries contribute to the project.

== Future equipment ==
=== Equipment ordered ===
Model	Images	Origin	Type	Quantity ordered	Planned to enter service in	Notes
Small weapons
Akeron MP		France	ATGM	761	2026	The Akeron MP was ordered in August 2023. It will be used with: Infantry ATGM: With a CLU (command launch unit), a man portable anti-tank launch unit It will replace the Spike MR which will retire by 2030.; EBRC Jaguar: 2 on launchers of the EBRC Jaguar.
Indirect fire
CAESAR NG		France	Self-propelled artillery	28	2027	Orders: 9 ordered in May 2022 as part of the CaMo 2 programme for €62 million.; 19 additional approved for purchased in December 2023, signed in February 2024.; 28 Caesar to equip: 2 battalions - 12 Caesar per battalion in 2 batteries; 4 Caesar for training
Mecar 155mm ammunition		France; Belgium	155mm artillery shells	–	2026	Mecar (now KNDS Belgium) will supply 155mm ammunition to the Belgian Army for the CAESAR NG.
Griffon MEPAC		France	Mortar Carrier	24	2028	February 2024, purchase of 24 Griffon MEPAC as part of the CaMo programme (phase 2). The purchased was approved in December 2023 by the Belgian Council of Ministers to replace the Mo-120 RT. Equipment of the MEPAC mortar carriers: VBMR Griffon vehicle; 2R2M mortar system; Artillery command and control system; Thales BARAGE jammer; The MEPAC systems will equip two batteries with two platoons each from 2028.
Mortar ammunition	(illustration)	TBD	Mortar ammunition	–	2025 - 2031	Tender launched in 2025 for the purchase of mortar ammunition.
Armoured vehicles
VBMR-L Serval		France	Multirole armoured vehicle	123	–	The parliament approved the purchase of 123 VBMR-L Serval in December 2025 as part of the CaMo 3 phase. The potential variants planned are: V/SHORAD (mentioned under the section "Air defence" in this table); Command vehicles for the general staff; Command vehicle for indirect fire; Communication vehicle for the transmissions
Unarmoured fighting vehicles
Can-Am Outlander Max Pro HD7	(illustration)	Canada	ATV	62		The parliament approved the purchase of 62 ATV in December 2025. The purchase is for the SOR (Régiment des opérations spéciales).
Logistics vehicles
PANAV 3-axle trailer	(illustration)	Czech Republic	Full trailer	204	2026	
Engineering vehicles
KNDS Leguan Tatra Phoenix 10×10	(illustration)	Germany; Czech Republic	AVLB	8	TBA	Contract signed in January 2026 for 8 bridge layers based on a truck. The contract also includes 17 26-metre bridges, transport trucks, and special tools.
Emergency vehicles
Fire Technics NV (based on Renault K-truck 4×4)	(illustration)	France	Multi-role fire truck	5	2025	In addition to firefighting, the vehicles also support demining exercises, shooting drills, and the testing of new weapons.
UGV / robot
L3Harris Technologies T4	(illustration)	Australia	EOD radar	14	2026	Robot selected and ordered in June 2025, to equip the DOVO.
Short range air defence
Senhive	–	Belgium	Drone detection radar	–	–	Emergency order worth €10 million, in December 2025, for anti-drone defence.
Saab Giraffe 1X	–	Sweden	Short-range, AESA, 3D radar	–	–	Emergency order worth €9 million, in December 2025, for anti-drone defence.
MBDA Mistral 3		France	MANPADS	–	–	Letter of intent signed in June 2023 to purchase the Mistral 3 with multiple other countries (Cyprus, Estonia, France and Hungary). Thie intention is for a framework agreement for the acquisition of 1,000 missiles, with a first firm order of 500 missiles. In June 2024, the framework agreement for the order of the Mistral 3 was signed by the DGMR. In November 2025, additional countries joined the agreement for a total of 1,500 missiles (Denmark, Romania, Slovenia, Spain). In March 2026, Belgium ordered 465 Mistral missiles for €226.7.
Skyranger 30		Switzerland	Air defence cannon	20	–	Order of 20 air defence cannons. The variant selected is the palletised one, which is on a hooklift system to be transported by vehicle.
Medium range air defence
NASAMS 3		Norway; United States	Short to medium range air-defence fire unit	10 (fire units)	1 fire unit on lease from Norway from 2027	10 fire units ordered via the Netherlands, contract signed on July 8th 2026.
Thales GM200 MM/C		Netherlands	Mobile, S-band (IEEE), multi-mission, AESA, GaN, 4D radar	14	–	To be used for air surveillance and air defence, also capable of performing counter-battery and artillery location missions.
Iveco vehicle	–	Italy	Vehicle	54	–	54 command and support vehicles ordered to Iveco in July 2026.

=== Planned investments ===
Model	Images	Origin	Type	Quantity planned	Notes
Artillery
MLRS programme		TBD	MLRS	–	Needs for a MLRS system, to be selected / purchased in 2026. Likely to be purchased in collaboration with France. Both countries are looking for two competing sovereign consortiums for this programme, or off-the-shelf solutions. Potential systems: (Germany) / (Israel) EuroPULS; (Germany) / (United States) GMARS; (South Korea) / (Poland) K239PL Chunmoo; (Belgium) / (France) Consortium 1, to be defined; (Belgium) / (France) Consortium 2, to be defined
Deep Strike programme	RCM^{2}: JFS-M: CTM-290:	TBD	Surface-to-surface missile	–	The Deep Strike programme looks to get the capacity to hit strategic targets from a distance. Several missiles could fit that expectation, some already in service, some in development, and some concepts proposed. Among the possible candidates: (France) / (Germany) / (Italy) / (Poland) / (Sweden) / (United Kingdom) ELSA (2,000 km (1,200 mi)); (United States) Typhon missile system with BGM-109M Tomahawk Block Vb (> 1,000 mi (1,600 km)); (France) MBDA LCM (1,000 km (620 mi)); (Germany) RCM^{2} (> 500 km (310 mi)); (United States) PrSM (60 to 500 km (37 to 311 mi)); (Germany) JFS-M (499 km (310 mi)); (Norway) / (Germany) NSM (> 300 km (190 mi)); (United States) ATACMS (300 km (190 mi)); (Israel) Predator Hawk (300 km (190 mi)); (South Korea) CTM-290 (290 km (180 mi)); (France) FLP-T Thundart (150 km (93 mi))
Summarised CaMo needs
CaMo armoured vehicles	–	France; Belgium	AFV	+ 819	474 VBMR Griffon, 60 EBRC Jaguar, 24 Griffon MEPAC, 123 VBMR-L Serval. Together with the VBAE and the four vehicles mentioned above, the Belgian Army expects to receive a total of 1,500 armoured vehicles.
Armoured vehicles
VBAE Véhicule blindé d’aide à l'engagement	–	France; Belgium	IMV	–	Vehicle in development in collaboration between France (Arquus, KNDS France) and Belgium (John Cockerill Defence), and supervised by OCCAR. The cooperation agreement was signed in December 2023.
Logistics vehicles
Logistics vehicles	–	TBD	Trucks	1,199	Logistics fleet to grow from 901 vehicles to 2,100 vehicles.
Engineering vehicles
EGC Engin du Génie de Combat	–	France; Belgium	AEV	30	Part of the CaMo collaboration framework, approved by both countries in June 2024. Project led by OCCAR, 200 to be manufactured in total, 30 expected for Belgium. Likely system based on the CNIM Auroch (8×8), and to be developed in collaboration with KNDS France, Texelis.
Boats
DRHIB Droppable Rigid Hull Inflatable Boats		TBD	RHIB	6	Open tender launched in June 2025 with an option for 3 additional boats for the Netherlands Maritime Special Operations Forces.
Air defence
SAMP/T - NG Système sol-air moyenne portée terrestre - new generation		France; Italy	Medium to long range air-defence system / Anti-medium range ballistic defence system	3	3 fire units expected to be ordered.
MIM-104 Patriot PAC3+		United States	Medium to long range air-defence system / Anti-medium range ballistic defence system	3	3 fire units expected to be ordered.
VBMR-L Serval - V/SHORAD Véhicule blindé multi-rôle léger	–	France; Italy	SPAAW - V/SHORAD	–	Short range air defence based on 2-3 vehicles: 1 VBMR-L Serval equipped with a remote turret with Mistral-3 missiles; 1 VBMR-L Serval equipped with a Saab Giraffe 1X radar; 1 SPAAG with a 30mm canon (likely the Skyranger 30 as mentioned above).

== Former equipment ==
Extended content

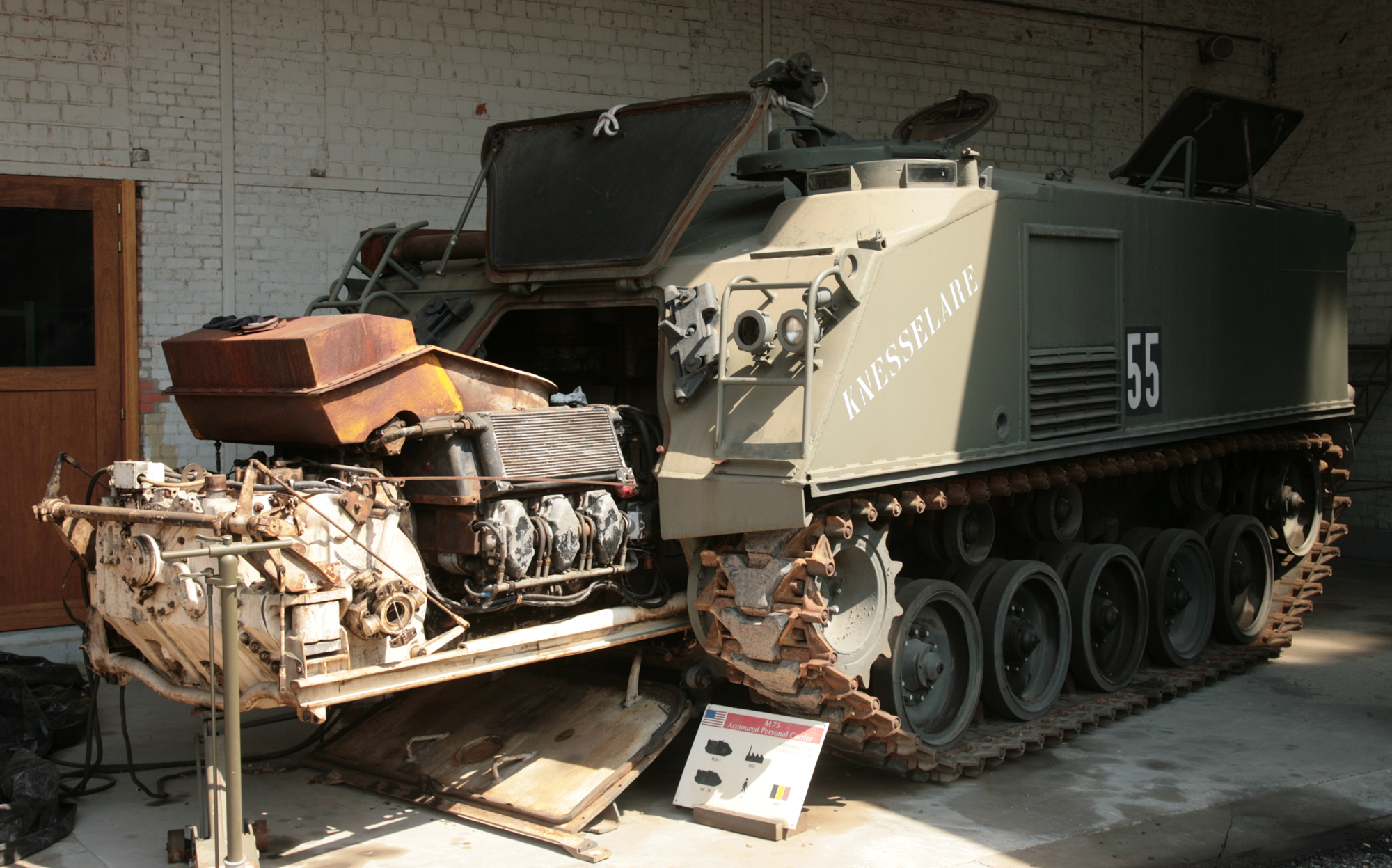
An M75 APC at the Brussels Army Museum

- MAP - NATO :
  - Armor
    - (United Kingdom) Sherman Firefly
    - (United States) M4 105 mm
    - (United States) M24 Chaffee
    - (United States) M26 Pershing
    - (United States) M46 Patton
    - (United States) M47 Patton
    - (United States) M41 Walker Bulldog
    - (Germany) Leopard 1
    - (United States) M22 Locust
  - Armoured fighting vehicles
    - (United States) M75
    - (France) AMX-VCI
    - (United Kingdom) CVR(T)
    - (United States) AIFV
    - (United States) M113 including indigenous variants
    - (United States) Various types of M3 Half-track
  - SP artillery
    - (United States) M7 Priest
    - (United States) M44 155 mm Howitzer Motor Carriage
    - (Germany) Jagdpanzerkanone JPK
    - (Germany) Flakpanzer Gepard
    - (United States) M108
    - (United States) M109
  - Others
    - (United States) M74 Armored Recovery Vehicle
    - (Sweden) Volvo Fassi N10
    - (Germany) Bergepanzer 2A1
  - Aircraft and helicopters
    - (France) Aérospatiale Alouette II
    - (Italy) AgustaWestland AW109
    - (United Kingdom) Airspeed Horsa
    - (United Kingdom) Britten-Norman BN-2 Islander
    - (Germany) Dornier Do 27
    - (United States) Piper PA-18 Super Cub
- See Belgian aircraft registration and serials
  - Unmanned aerial vehicles
    - (United States) Northrop KD2R Shelduck
    - (Belgium) MBLE Épervier
