= London Bridge Trading Company =

American manufacturer of bags and tactical gear

London Bridge Trading
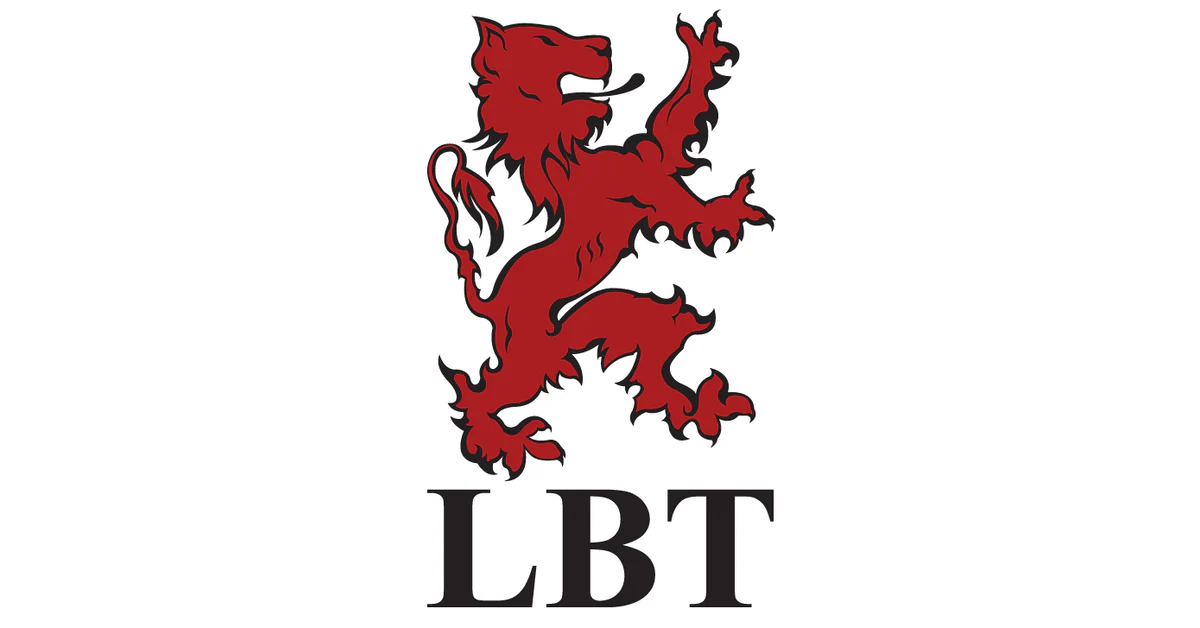
- Founded: November 1985; 40 years ago in Virginia Beach, Virginia
- Founder: Doug McDougal
- Headquarters: 2861 Guardian Ln, Virginia Beach, VA 23452
- Subsidiaries: LBX Tactical
- Website: lbtinc.com

Beaufort, DBA London Bridge Trading is an American manufacturer of backpacks, bags and tactical gear.

== History ==
London Bridge Trading Company was founded in November 1985 by Doug McDougal after leaving his career as a professor at Eastern Virginia Medical School in Norfolk, Virginia.

In 2023 the company was accused in the United States District Court for the Southern District of Ohio of deliberately deceiving their customers in breach of the Buy American Act, the Trade Agreements Act and the Berry Amendment, after the company falsely claimed that more than one of its products were made in the US, and sold them to the US Department of Defense. In November 2023, the company settled with the U.S. Immigration and Customs Enforcement (ICE) for $2.1 million over one of these falsely labeled product lines. The company had replaced foreign country of origin labels with labels purporting that the product was made in the US.

After the settlement, in Dec 2023, LBT was acquired by Survitec Group, a private equity-backed organization that also owns: RFD, SurvitecZodiac, DSB, RFD Toyo, Elliot, Maritime Protection, Novenco Fire Fighting, Crewsaver, Yak, Eurovinil, Helippe, and Biardo Survival Suits
