= Crye Precision =

American tactical apparel company

- Industry: Apparel and accessories
- Headquarters: Brooklyn, New York City, US
- Key people: Caleb Crye and Gregg Thompson
- Number of employees: 150 (2013)
- Website: cryeprecision.com

Crye Precision is an American apparel and accessories company based in New York City. They are a major manufacturer of Berry Amendment compliant items for the US military. Crye created the common camouflage pattern MultiCam in 2002.

== History ==
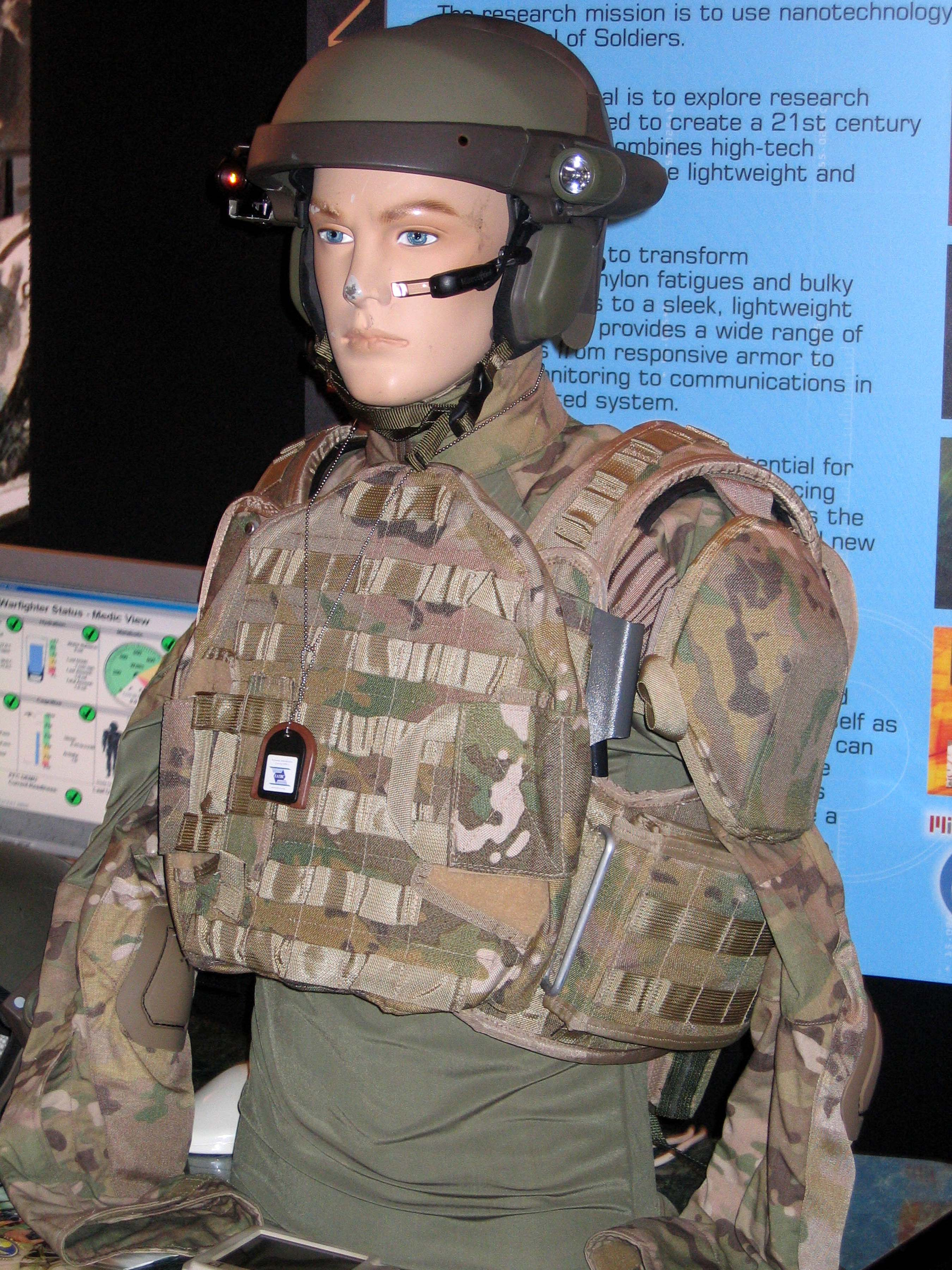
A mannequin wearing an early prototype of a MultiCam combat shirt in July 2004

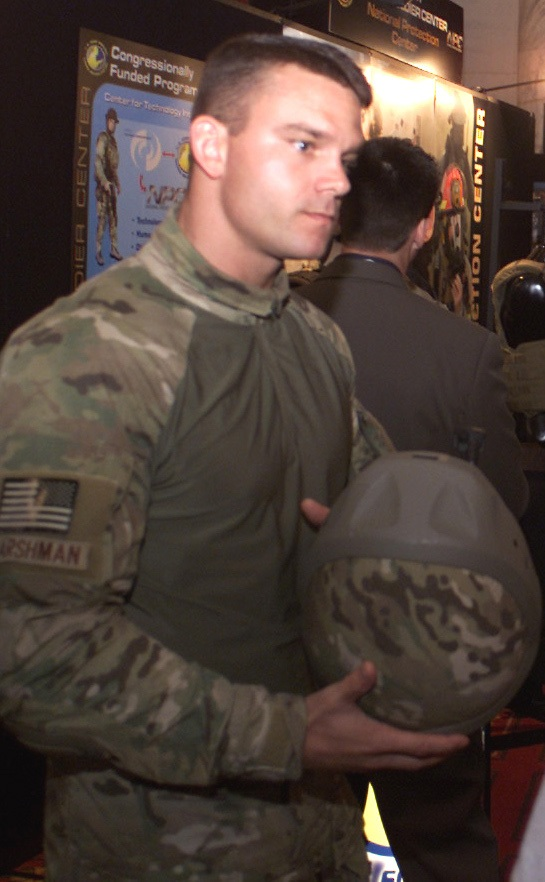
A U.S. Army soldier at the U.S. Capitol in June 2005, modelling an early prototype MultiCam combat shirt at a military technology convention

Crye Precision was founded in New York City in 1999 by Caleb Crye and Gregg Thompson, both graduates of Cooper Union. Its original office/production studio was in Chelsea Market. They expanded rapidly following 9/11 and the passage of the Berry Amendment which required the Department of Defense to give purchasing preference to apparel and accessories made in America from American components.

First unveiled in 2002, MultiCam was designed for the use of the U.S. Army in varied environments, seasons, elevations, and light conditions. It is a seven-color, multi-environment camouflage pattern developed by Crye Precision in conjunction with the United States Army Soldier Systems Center.

The pattern was included in the U.S. Army's move to replace the 3-Color Desert and Woodland patterns. In 2004, the U.S. Army chose the Universal Camouflage Pattern that came to be used in the Army Combat Uniform. It remained in limited use by the U.S. Army special forces in the mid-to-late 2000s in Iraq and Afghanistan. MultiCam was also continually trialed for its "Future Force Warrior" program demonstrations.

In 2010, multiCam was re-commissioned by the U.S. Army, replacing UCP for units deploying to fight in the war in Afghanistan, under the designation "Operation Enduring Freedom Camouflage Pattern0 (OEF-CP). It had already been used by some American special operations units and civilian law enforcement agencies.

In November 2013, Crye Precision unveiled a family of MultiCam variants, which they claim can reduce the visual and near-IR signature of a person operating in different environments.

In 2013, the company had 150 employees spread over 56,000 square feet in New York and New Jersey.

The U.S. Army discontinued the use of UCP in October 2019.

In 2020, Crye was awarded a contract to produce a new family of uniforms for the British Royal Marines.

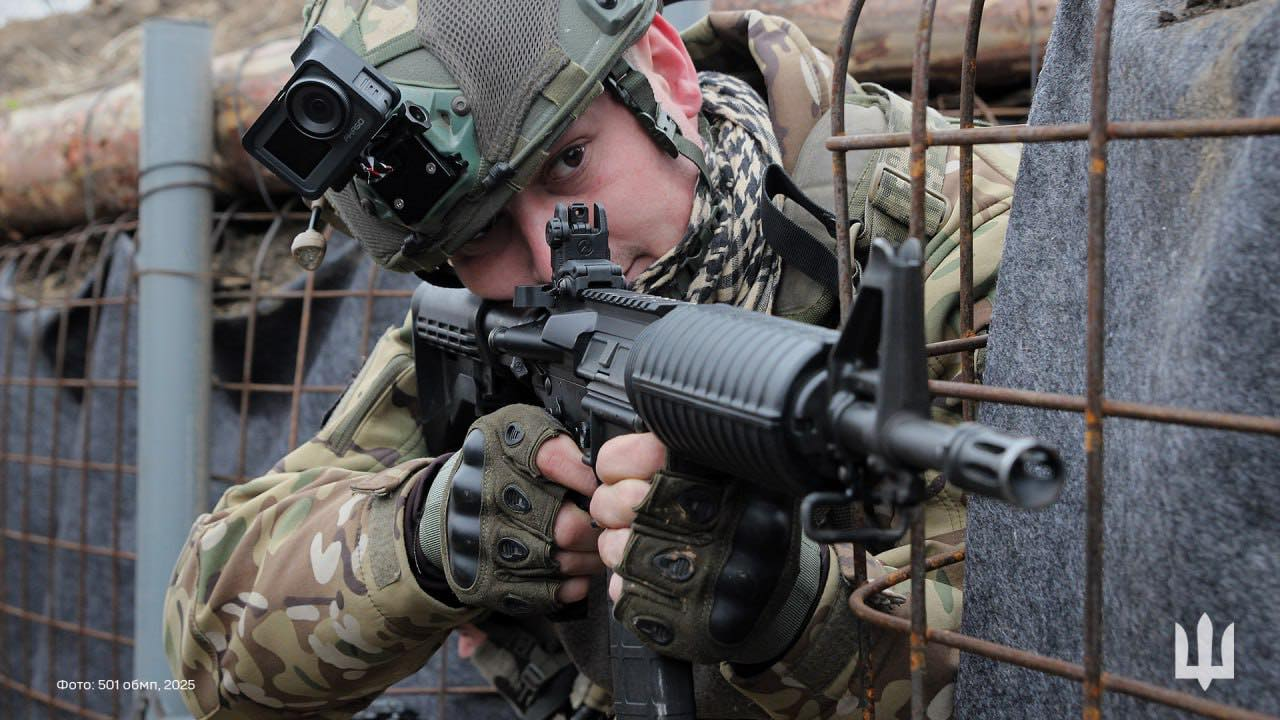
A Ukrainian serviceman in a Crye uniform in 2025

In April 2020, Crye collaborated with the Brooklyn Navy Yard, the NY Economic Development Council (NYEDC) and fashion house Lafayette 148 to manufacture surgical gowns for New York's front line medical workers during the coronavirus pandemic.

As part of the introduction of the Belgian Defence Clothing System, it was announced that the Jigsaw camouflage pattern would be phased out by the Belgian Armed Forces in favour of Multicam from November 2022. The contract was awarded to Sioen and Seyntex with Crye Precision under a budget of €410 million.

In 2024, Crye and another defense contractor's operations at the Brooklyn Navy Yard were the subject of protests from pro-Palestinian groups.

== Legal issues ==
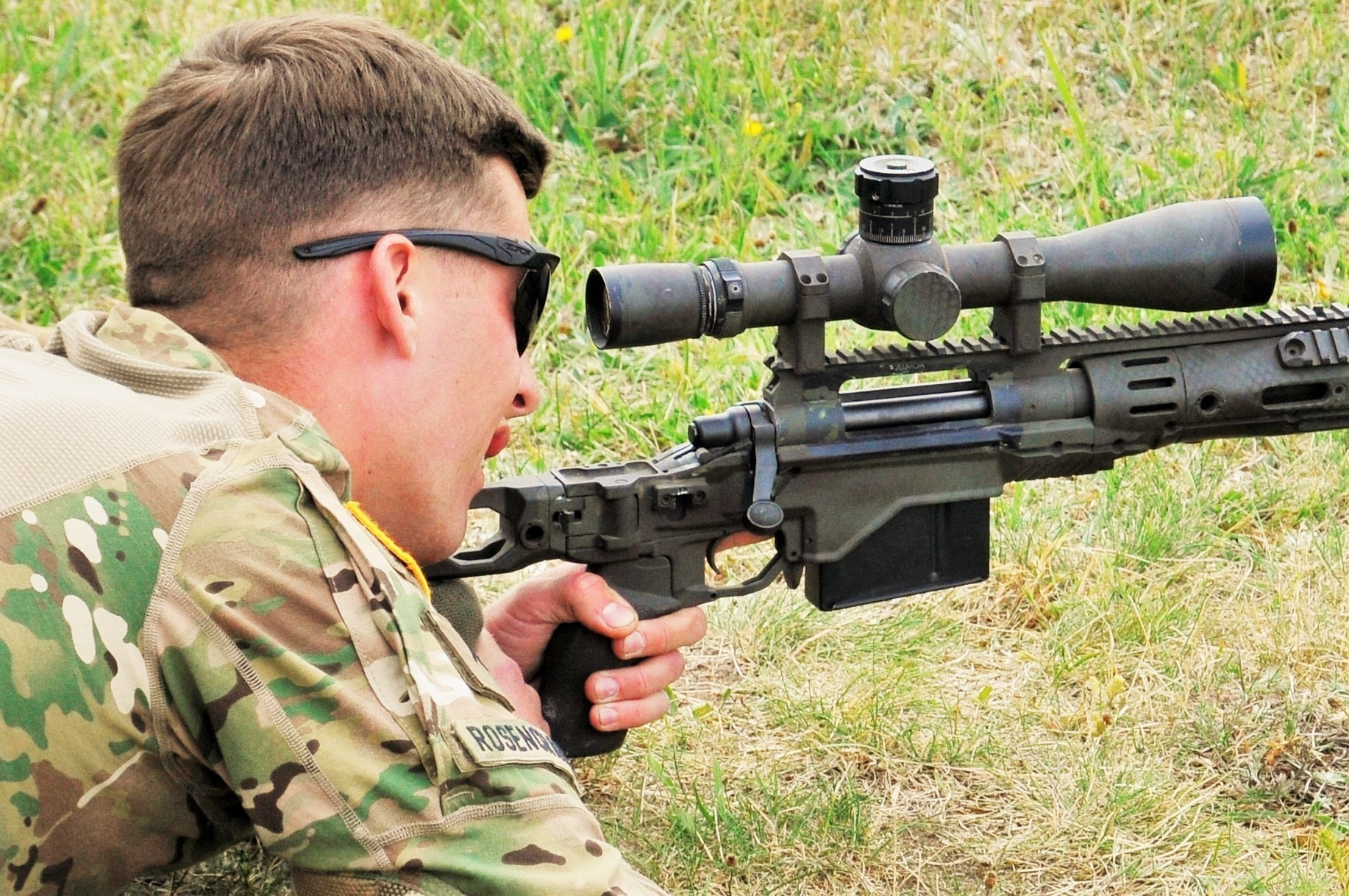
A Battle Group Poland US Army soldier wearing OCP camo, fires the M2010 Enhanced sniper rifle near the Bemowo Piskie Training Area during Saber Strike 17, June 2017.

In 2014, the company was engaged in a dispute over intellectual property related to the Operational Camouflage Pattern project with the US Army.

Crye has been targeted by Chinese counterfeiters. These products are often sold internationally on online retail platforms like Aliexpress. In 2018 an operation in California selling counterfeit Crye products made in China was taken down by American authorities.

== Products ==
- Combat Pants/Shirts
  - G1
  - G2
  - G3
  - G3.5
  - G4
- Magazine pouches etc.
- Plate carriers/Armor systems
  - JPC
  - SPC
  - MBAV
  - AVS
  - LV MBAV
  - R series

=== Limited editions ===
In 2024 Crye produced a limited edition acid washed denim version of its G3 combat uniform. The limited edition uniforms were to be auctioned off by veteran's charities.

== Awards and recognitions ==
In 2012, Crye were selected by New York Magazine as one of their annual "Reasons to Love New York."
