= Demining robot =

Robotic mine removal device

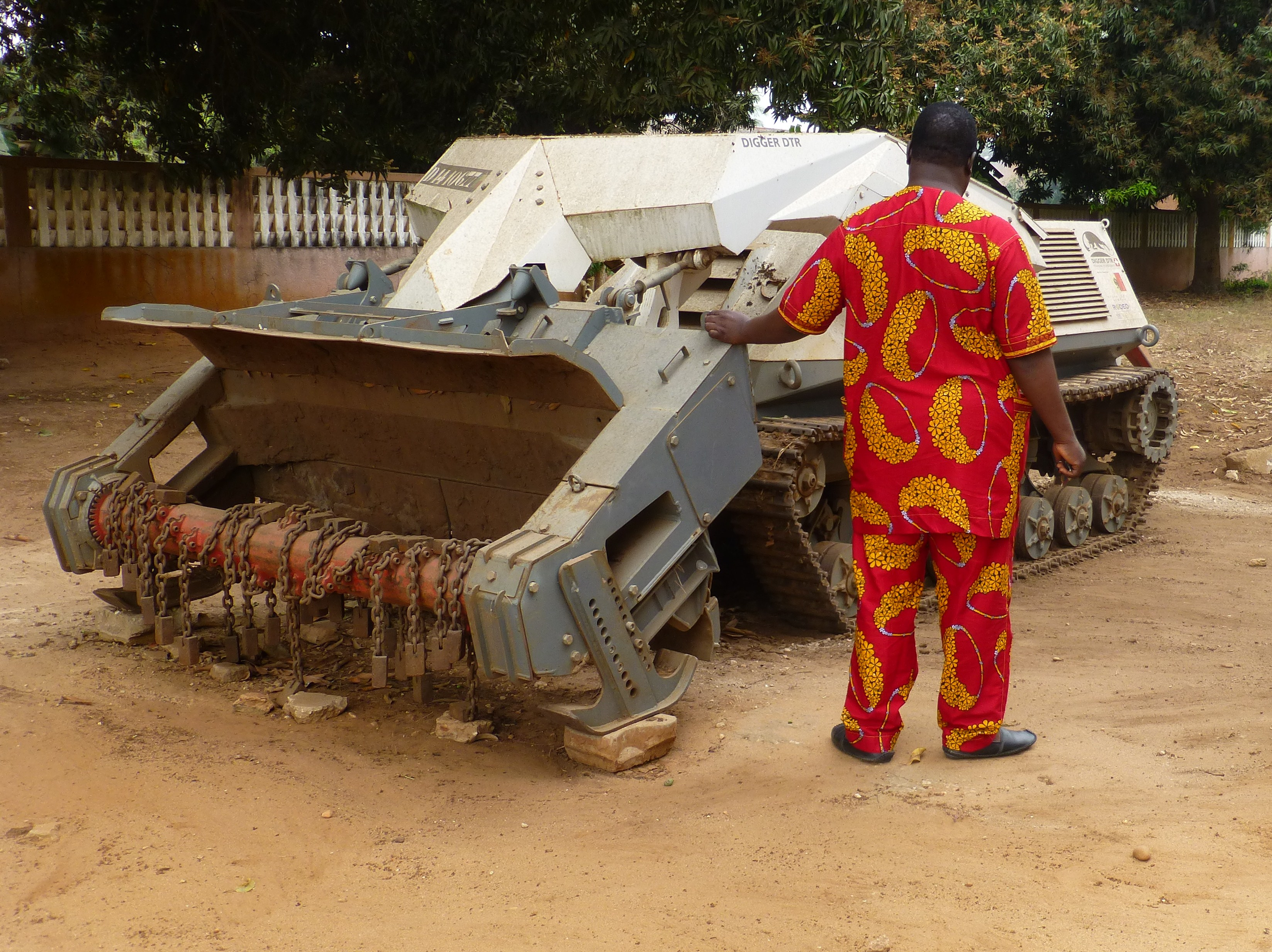
A large demining robot

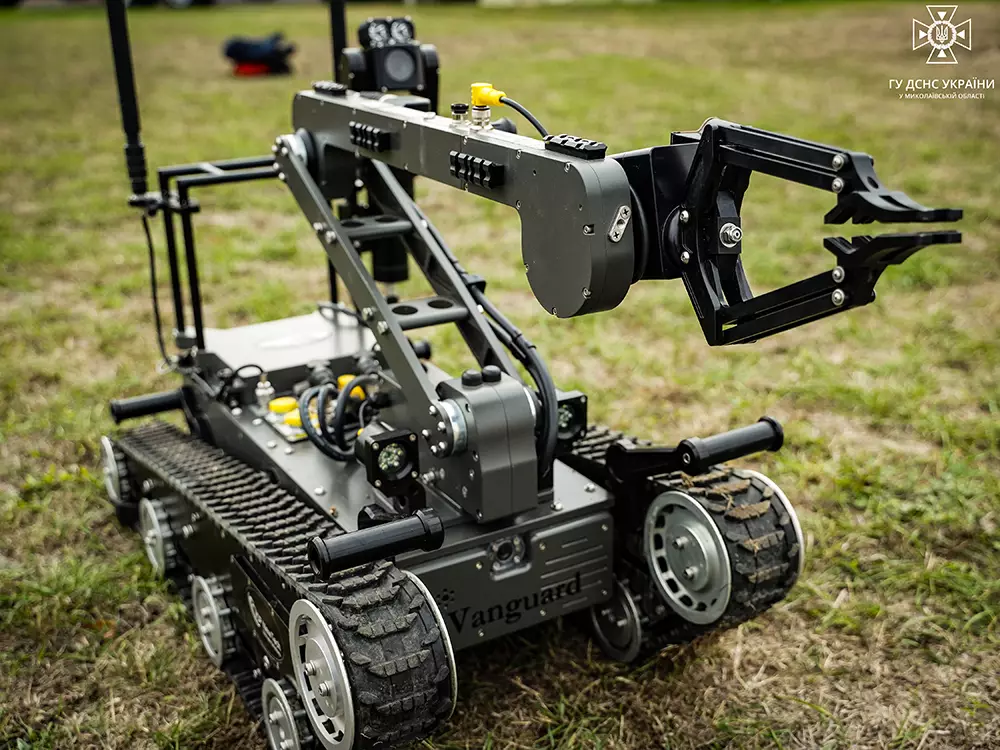
A small demining robot

A demining robot is a robotic land vehicle that is designed for detecting the exact location of land mines and clearing them. Demining by conventional methods can be costly and dangerous for people. Environments that are dull or dirty, or otherwise dangerous to humans, may be well-suited for the use of demining robots.

== Models ==
=== Uran-6 ===
Uran-6 is a demining robot model used by Russian Federation in Syria and Ukraine. The Uran-6 is a short-range and remotely piloted robot. Limitations of this robot include the need for human operators to be within a few hundred feet.

=== MV-4 Dok-Ing ===
MV-4 Dok-Ing is a demining robot model used by Republic of Croatia.
