= Jigsaw camouflage =

Military camouflage patterns

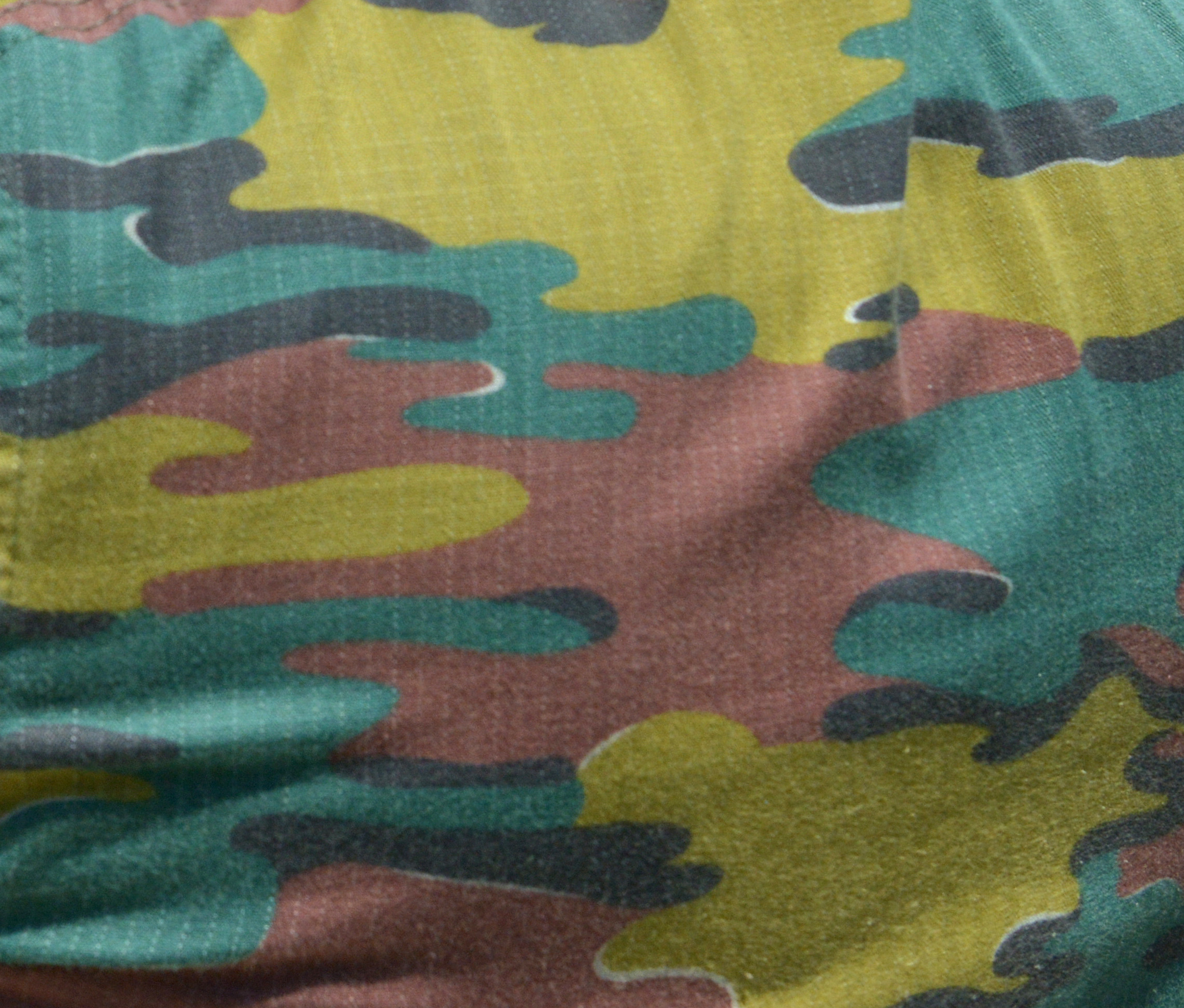
- Closeup of a swatch of Belgian Jigsaw camouflage-patterned ripstop fabric.
- Type: Military camouflage pattern
- Place of origin: Belgium

Service history
- In service: 1956–2022

Production history
- Manufacturer: Seyntex
- Variants: See Patterns

Jigsaw camouflage is the colloquial term for a series of camouflage patterns used by the Belgian Armed Forces between 1956 and 2022 and subsequently adapted in several other countries.

== History ==
After its adoption by the Belgian military in 1956, it was originally mainly used by Paracommandos. It was subsequently adopted across the Belgian Armed Forces underwent several variations from the original design. The final temperate variation was implemented in 2016.

A distinct jigsaw camouflage pattern inspired by the Belgian precedent was adopted by certain units of the Forces Armées Zaïroises in Zaire, a former Belgian colony, into the 1990s. Similar variants were also produced elsewhere in Africa.

As part of the introduction of the Belgian Defence Clothing System, it was announced that the pattern would be phased out by the Belgian Armed Forces in favour of Multicam from November 2022. The contract was awarded to Sioen and Seyntex with Crye Precision under a budget of €410 million. The pattern is held by an American patent.

== Patterns ==
A Belgian drill platoon wearing jigsaw camouflage uniforms in 2006

The main Belgian four-tone temperate version was officially designated as "Woodland". A desert version was also produced.

A number of jigsaw camouflage patterns inspired on the Belgian original have been adopted by foreign militaries. A Burundian variant with darker colors and a version with blue colorways were used by the Burundian military and police.

== Users ==
=== Current ===
- Belgium: Standard camouflage of the Belgian Armed Forces. Being replaced from November 2022 by Multicam in G4 clothing style.

=== Former ===
- Burundi: Known to be used by "certain local units" under Belgian colonial rule and briefly after independence by Burundian National Army.
- Chad: Belgian-based jigsaw camouflage was used by the Chadian Army in the 1980s.
- Democratic Republic of Congo: Formerly used by Force Publique and Armée Nationale Congolaise.
- Luxembourg: Belgian woodland and desert versions used by the Luxembourg Armed Forces during the War in Afghanistan.
