= Mercedes-Benz A-Class (W176) =

German hatchback (2013–2018)

Mercedes-Benz A (W176)
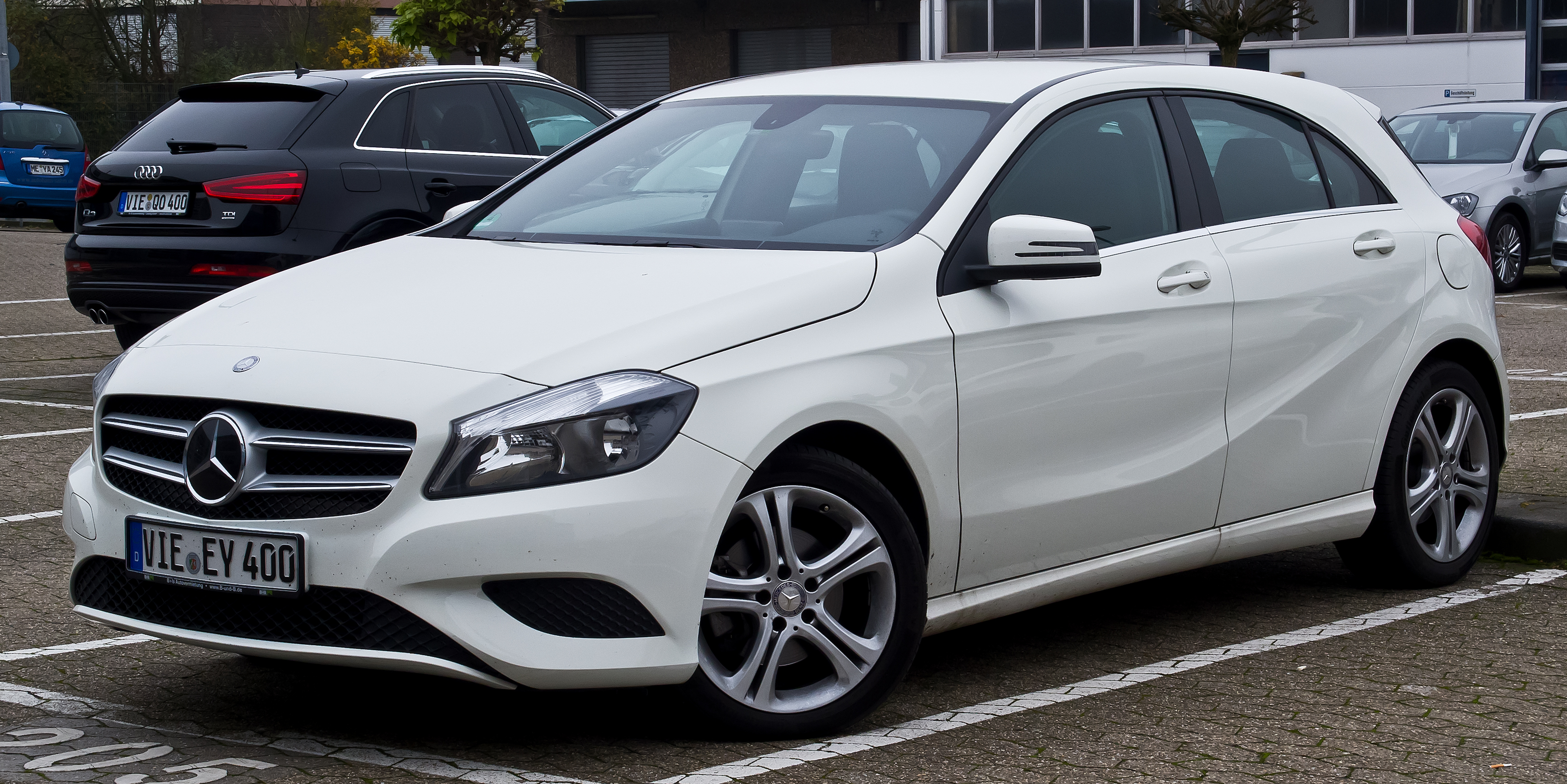
- 2014 Mercedes-Benz A 180 Urban 5-door hatchback pre-facelift (Germany)

Overview
- Manufacturer: Daimler AG
- Production: July 2012 – May 2018 (Germany); August 2013 – May 2018 (Finland)
- Model years: 2013–2018
- Assembly: Germany: Rastatt; Finland: Uusikaupunki (Valmet)
- Designer: Mark Fetherston (2009)

Body and chassis
- Class: Subcompact executive car (C)
- Body style: 5-door hatchback
- Layout: Front-engine, front-wheel-drive; Front-engine, all-wheel-drive (4MATIC)
- Platform: MFA
- Related: Mercedes-Benz B-Class (W246); Mercedes-Benz CLA-Class (C117); Mercedes-Benz GLA-Class (X156); Infiniti Q30; Infiniti QX30

Powertrain
- Engine: Petrol: 1.6 L M270 BlueEFFIENCY I4 turbo; 2.0 L M270 BlueEFFIENCY I4 turbo; Diesel: 1.5 L OM607 BlueTEC I4 turbo; 1.8 L OM651 BlueTEC I4 turbo; 2.2 L OM651 BlueTEC I4 turbo
- Transmission: 6-speed manual 7-speed automatic 7G-DCT

Dimensions
- Wheelbase: 2,699 mm (106.3 in)
- Length: 4,292–4,367 mm (169.0–171.9 in)
- Width: 1,780 mm (70.1 in)
- Height: 1,417–1,433 mm (55.8–56.4 in)
- Curb weight: 1,295–1,555 kg (2,855–3,428 lb)

Chronology
- Predecessor: Mercedes-Benz A-Class (W169)
- Successor: Mercedes-Benz A-Class (W177)

W176 is the internal designation for the third-generation of the Mercedes-Benz A-Class, which is a range of 5-door hatchbacks produced by Daimler AG under the Mercedes-Benz brand from July 2012 to May 2018. The model was introduced at the 2012 Geneva Motor Show officially as a subcompact executive / C-segment model for the first time after being a supermini / B-segment for fifteen years. This model does not offer a 3-door model, due to the decreasing popularity of 3-door models and its larger size. The W176 was available in some markets from September 2012. Models in the Japanese market went on sale in January 2013.

The A-Class is generally seen as a sportier and smaller alternative to the more practical and larger B-Class. Additionally, the W176 is the second vehicle to use the global, front-wheel-drive MFA platform (Modular Front Architecture), after the W246 which had arrived in November 2011, and before the C117, which had arrived in January 2013. Unlike the B-Class, which was available in a range of petrol, diesel, battery electric, and fuel cell, the A-Class is available only in petrol and diesel configurations. It is intended to be more dynamic than its predecessor and is focused primarily on younger owners, adopting a more sportier and upmarket design and a lower height.

The design for the third generation of A-Class was based on the 2011 Concept A-Class and was unveiled at the 2012 Geneva Motor Show. The facelifted model of the W176 was presented in Q3 2015. Orders for the facelifted model had started in July 2015, and mass production started in September. The facelift had added updated lights, technology, and models. The model was initially built exclusively in Rastatt, however from late 2013 was built in Uusikaupunki, Finland, for specific countries.

Production of the W176 had ended in May 2018. It was replaced by the heavily related W177 which was presented on 2 February 2018, and was later released in May of that year. The new model was available in sedan form for the first time.

== History of development ==
The Concept A-Class is a 3-door concept car that previewed the design of the third generation A-Class and was unveiled at the 2011 New York Auto Show. It featured the M270 four-cylinder petrol engine rated at 211 PS (155 kW; 208 hp), radar-based collision warning system with adaptive brake assist, and exterior design language from Mercedes-Benz's F800 concept.

In mid-2011, patent images of the W176 were leaked. The structural innovation was made by the chief developers for the body in white and safety at Mercedes-Benz. Jorg Prigl, Mercedes' head of development and design, states "the MFA also gives us the package room to fit a battery pack, fuel cell stack, hydrogen tanks and CNG tanks," stated Prigl. "It will allow us to build either an internal combustion or electrically driven vehicle, as well as a number of body styles." The brand additionally describes the A- and B-Class as "the first cars of the next chapter". The brand had also announced that three initial grades would be available: the "Urban", the "Style," and the range-topping "AMG Sport", and that it would go on sale in September 2012.

The base model as well as the AMG model were both spied in 2012. The spied AMG model had the grille and the logo being covered by a large appendage. It was announced by Mercedes that the AMG A 45 model would feature a straight-four engine with an all-wheel drive powertrain. American magazine Car and Driver had guessed an A 25 AMG model would be available, although this prediction had never came to fruition. A 4,290 mm (169 in) 5-door hatchback, the model belongs to the C-segment category and is collectively referred to as the W176.

By July 2012—a few days before its production start—the W176 had already received 40,000 pre-orders in Europe, even before its September launch. By late August 2012, 50,000 pre-orders had already been made, while by mid-November 90,000 orders had already been made, according to Daimler CEO Dieter Zetsche. This number, according to news agency Reuters, is double what the VII VW Golf had received, which was released at around the same time. This makes the A-Class' launch the brand's most successful one of all time.

The official series manufacture of this model began on 17 July 2012 at the Rastatt plant, while it had become available in most countries from September of that year. The MFA platform which the W176 utilizes, was used on the Infiniti Q30 and QX30.

Mercedes-Benz signed an agreement with the Finnish supplier Valmet Automotive to expand A-Class vehicle production, where Valmet would produce more than 100,000 units for Daimler from 2013 through 2016, the agreement was later continued to cover the rest of the production time of the third version which came to an end when production of the fourth version began in 2018. It's predicted that no less than 202,149 of the A-Class W176, B-Class W246, and the CLA C117 have been delivered in the first seven months of 2013, which is a 62.7 per cent raise from 2012. In 2017 Mercedes-Benz signed a new agreement with the Finnish supplier for the fourth version.

During the A-Class production period, former CEO Tim Reuss intended to market the third-generation A-Class in Canada, motivated by the success of the best-selling B-Class, which was unavailable in the United States. The recent free-trade agreement between Canada and the EU was signed in the autumn of 2016; however, there were no initiatives undertaken to implement the UNECE regulations, which ultimately did not take effect.

Production of A-series BlueDirect 4-cylinder engines took place at Mercedes-Benz engine production plant in Kölleda, Germany.

== Design and specifications ==
=== Exterior ===
In terms of length and width, the W176 has grown by 490 mm (19 in) and 16 mm (0.63 in) respectively, while its height has lowered by up to 7 cm (2.8 in) and its wheelbase has enlarged by 132 mm (5.2 in). The production model follows the design of the concept model which Gorden Wagener states "translating the new dynamic style of Mercedes-Benz into the compact class was a challenge that was great fun to tackle". Wagener also states that "no other car in this segment is as progressive as the A-Class" and that "the character lines, in particular on its sides, lend the A-Class structure and terseness." The W176 features the characteristic V-shape and the typical radiator grille with twin slats to either side of the car. The light modules and LEDs behind the headlamp cover glass were designed to create to cue called the "flare effect" for the daytime running lamps and indicators. The roof spoiler hides the aerials of the vehicle, giving the W176 a sportier look, as well as structure to the roof. A line is positioned right in front of the rear wheel arch, which slowly fades away. Its drag coefficient had reached 0.26, down from the 0.31 figure of the previous model. Its drag coefficient is relatively good for the small family hatchback class, in comparison to the 8V Audi A3 and the F20 BMW 1 Series, which both have a 0.32 figure. The center of gravity and seating position were lowered by 24 mm (0.94 in) and 174 mm (6.9 in) respectively. Its lower center of gravity was possible, thanks to the brand's decision to ditch the sandwich construction. For the first time, the A-Class is a available in optional full-LED lamps.

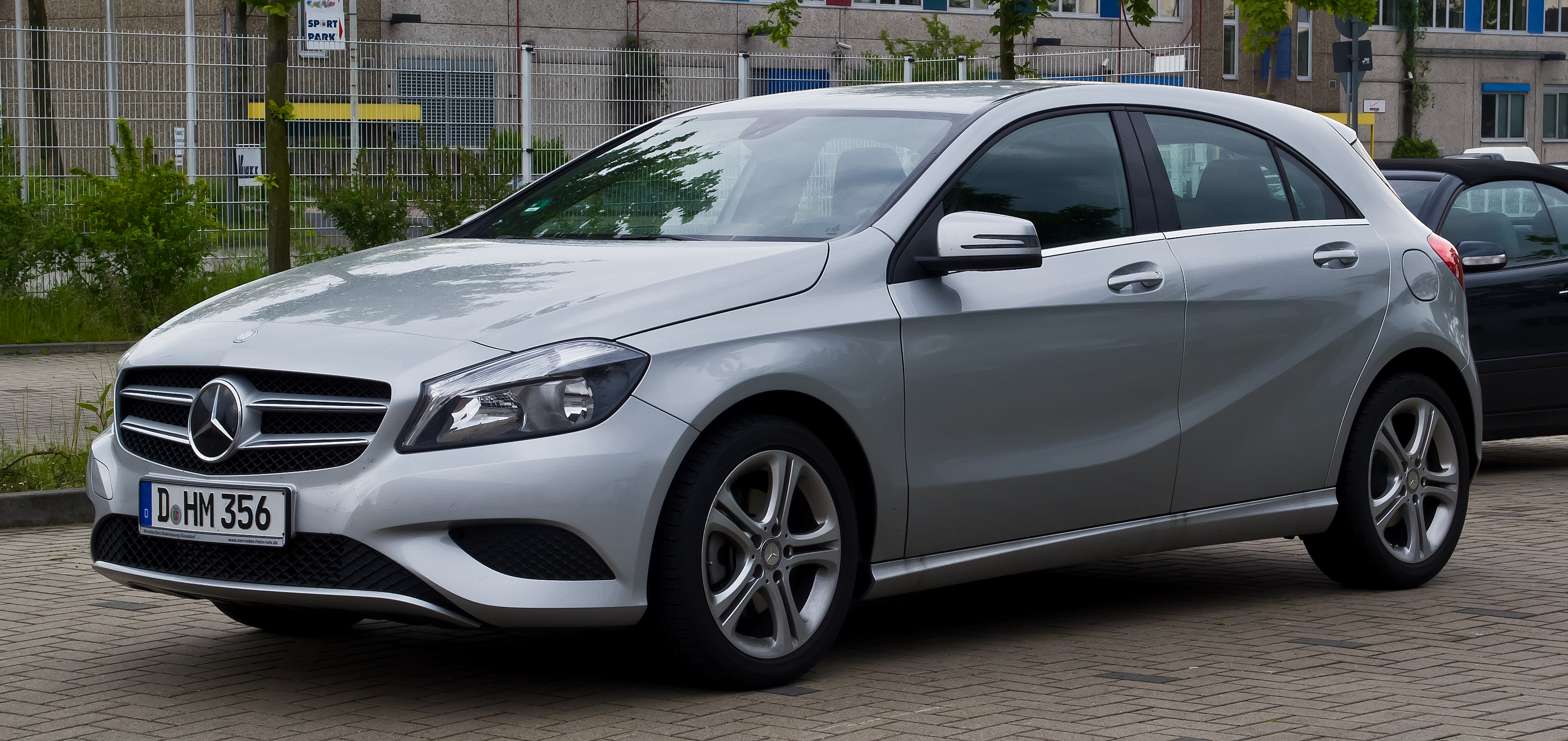
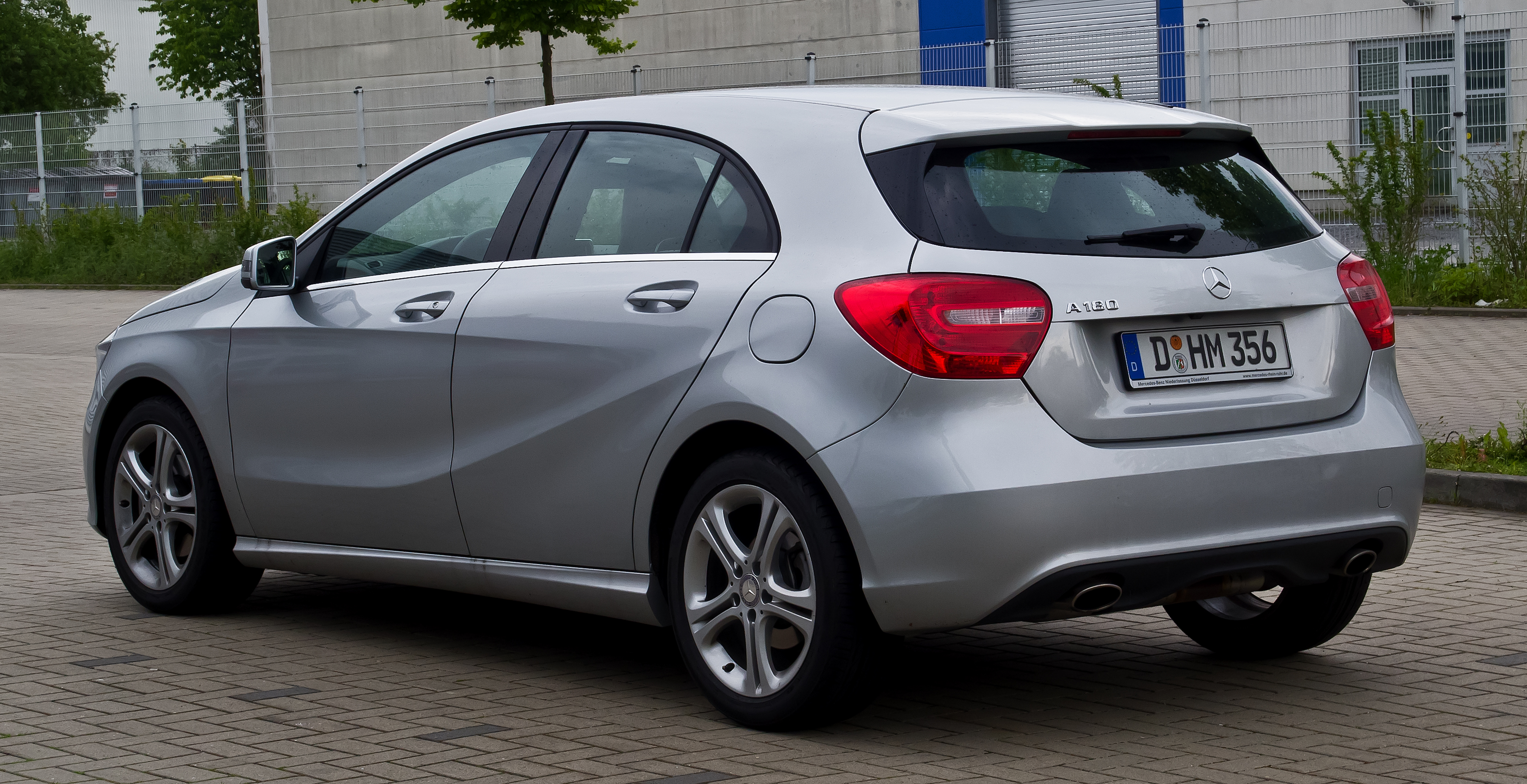
2013 Mercedes-Benz A 180 Urban (pre-facelift; Germany)

=== Features and practicality ===
Standard features include: climate control air-conditioning, cruise control with adjustable speed limiter function, automatic windscreen wipers, and automatic headlights. Standard interior luxuries include Nappa leather trim on the steering wheel, multimedia system with a CD player, digital radio, USB input, 8.0-inch colour display, and around six speakers. Other assistance systems include satellite navigation, Bluetooth connectivity for phone calls and audio streaming. Apple CarPlay is featured and MirrorLink can project the phone's display unto the car's screen.

Safety systems include: reversing camera, parking sensors front and rear, active parking assist, and hill start assist. On the A45, the Sport+ mode replaces the Eco. The model features nine airbags (standard in Australia), electronic stability control, autonomous braking, driver drowsiness detection (Attention Assist), and blind-spot alert. The W176 was also equipped with the Pre-Safe function which is activated by emergency braking, Collision Prevention Assist, which is operated at speeds between 7 and 250 km/h (4.3 and 155.3 mph), can detect a collision at speeds of between 30 and 250 km/h (19 and 155 mph), and can detect stationary objects at up to 70 km/h (43 mph). The model also features a redesigned electromechanical power steering (EPS) system in which the electric motor of the servo assistance system is located on the steering gear serving as a dual pinion system. The EPS featured systems consisting of: Countersteering, corrective steering, and Active Park Assist. The Euro NCAP tested model had received a rating of five stars.

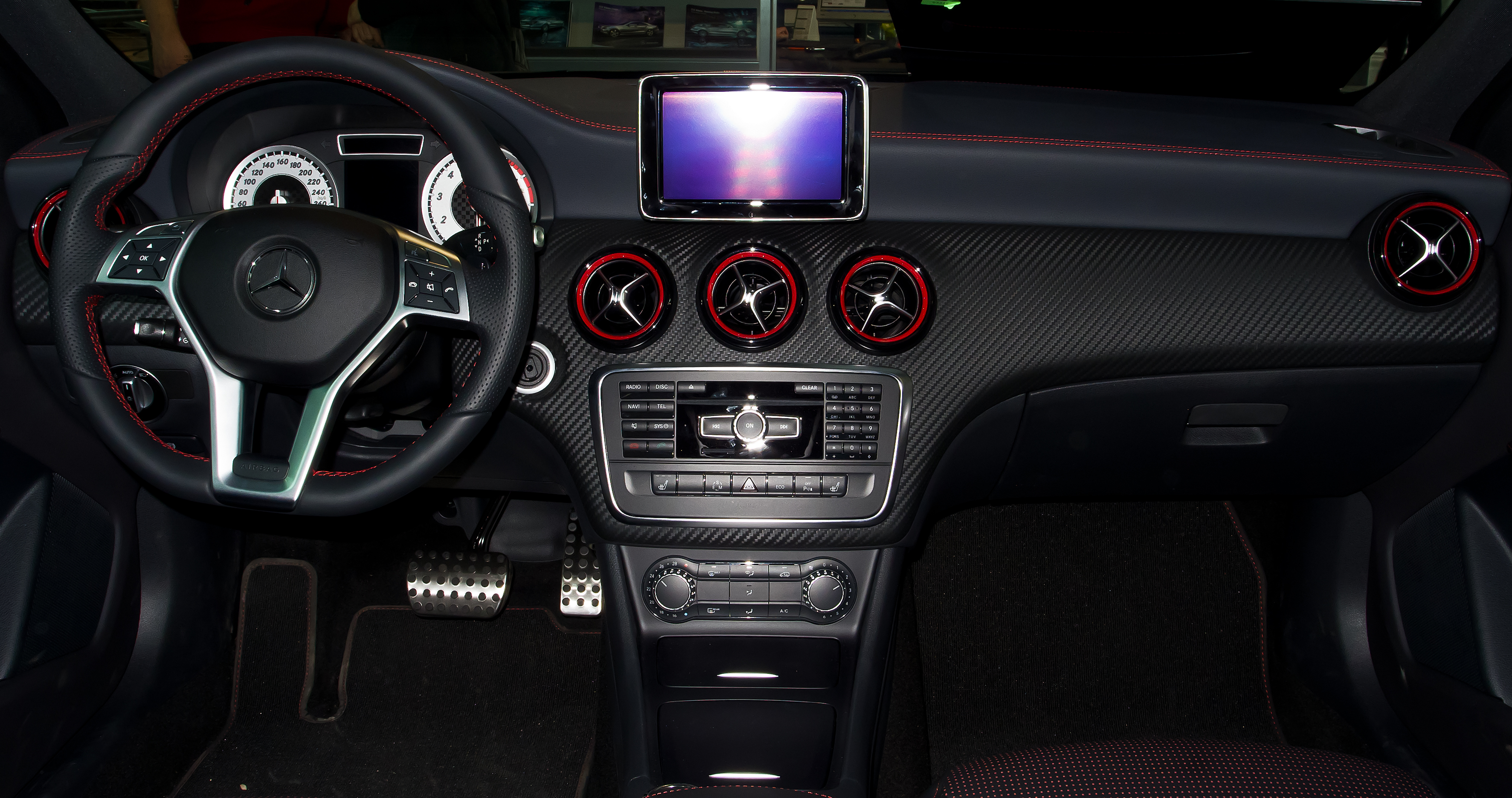
Interior of the A 250 Sport (pre-facelift)

Like the W246 B-Class which the A-Class shares its platform with, the W176 has MacPherson strut front suspension, while featuring a four-link setup at the rear. The BlueEFFICIENCY is featured on the third-generation A-Class, which is a series of measures which reduce fuel consumption and CO_{2} emissions. These features include: start/stop function which switches off the engine temporarily when the vehicle is stationary, alternator management for regenerative braking, and optimised tyres for rolling resistance which have low energy requirements while driving and also help to reduce fuel consumption. The A 180 BlueEFFICIENCY model was available from launch.

The W176 offers 341 litres (12.0 cu ft) of boot space with seats up, 1,157 litres (40.9 cu ft) with rear seats down. Seats fold in a 60/40 split. The W176 features a three-spoke multi-function steering wheel, adjustable in both width and height, and three-point seat belts on all seats. Additionally the W176 features a folding rear seat. The A 180 models feature steel 195/65R15 wheels with covers in a 10-hole design, while the A 200 feature steel 205/55R16 wheels with covers in 10-hole design. The high-spec models feature 10-spoke 225/45R17 wheels with light alloy rims.

== Trim levels ==
=== Europe ===
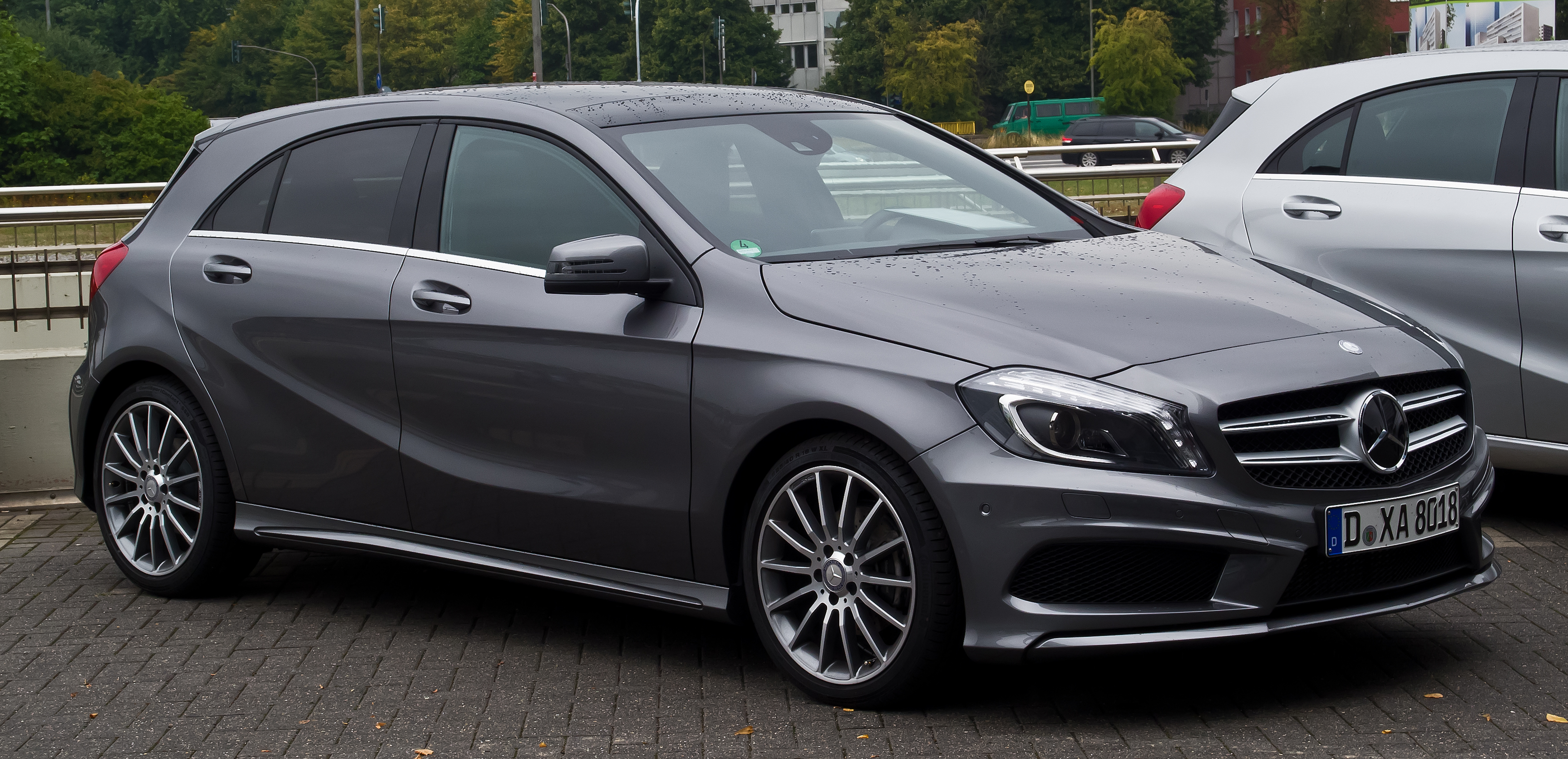
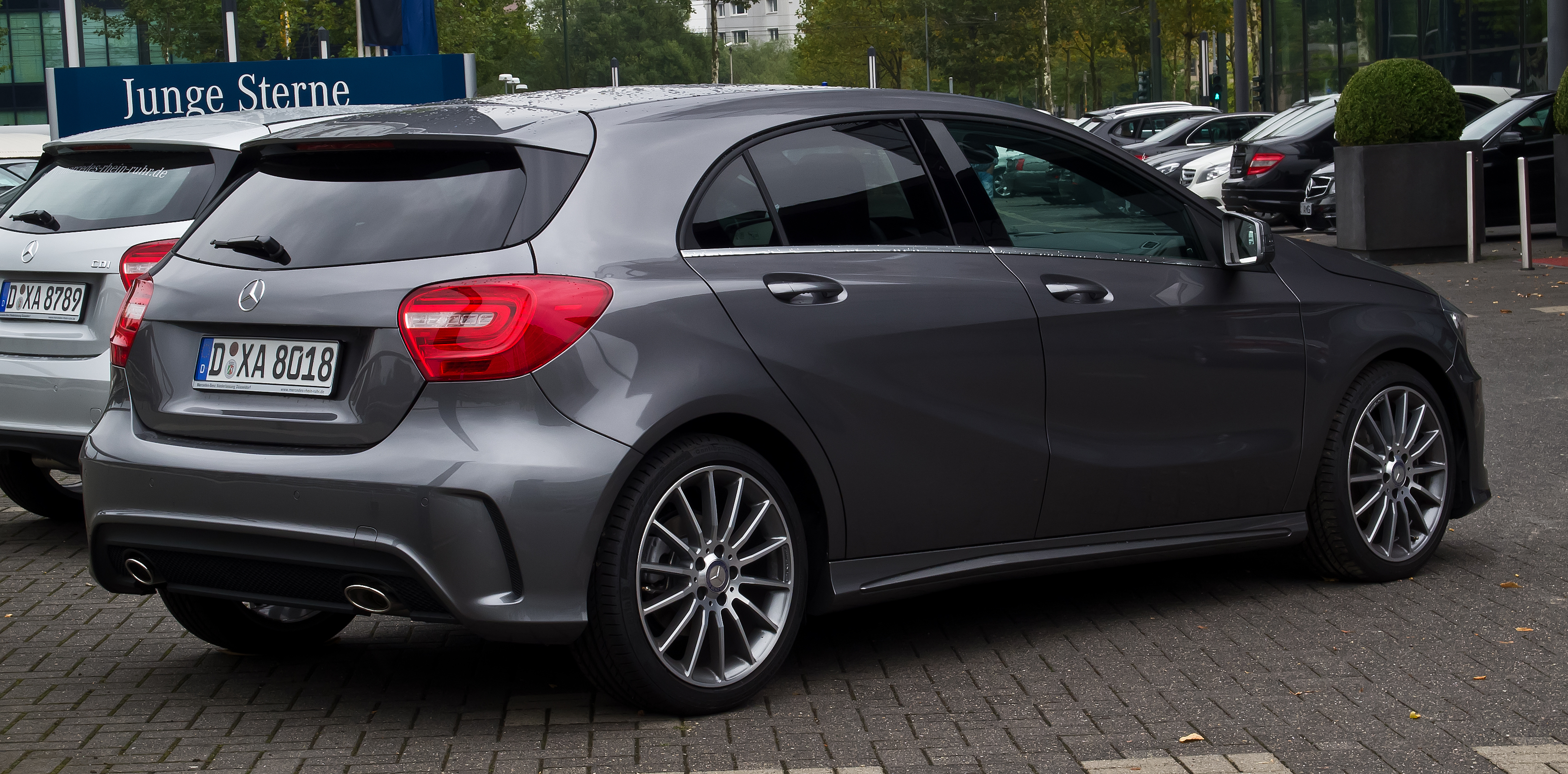
2013 Mercedes-Benz A 180 CDI AMG Line (Germany; pre-facelift)

From launch in the UK and other countries, trim levels were similar to those of the B-Class, which had consisted of the SE, Sport, AMG Sport, and the range topping AMG model. The AMG Sport model was later replaced by the AMG Line. The SE A-Class features 16-inch alloy wheels, comfort suspension, reversing camera, a 7-inch infotainment system, Garmin satellite navigation, smartphone integration via Apple CarPlay, supportive leather seats, fabric upholstery, CD radio sound system, USB port and Bluetooth. Adding to the SE model, the Sport model features 17-inch wheels, restyled upholstery and cruise control, while the AMG Sport / AMG Line models add firmer suspension, which improve the cornering capability, meaning decreased ride comfort. The AMG Line and Sport models also feature upgraded brakes, 18-inch alloy wheels and an overall sporty design. The A 250 Sport model was designed by Mercedes-AMG, and featured a diamond grille and one single slat. It features red elements, red brake calipers, and Sport badges on the fenders. In Germany and a few other countries, trim levels consisted of the Urban, Style and AMG Line. The base-level Style grade features 10-spoke 16-inch alloy wheels as standard, integral sports seats at the front, optionally made in fake leather, and contrasting topstitching and silver chrome in specific places. The mid-level Urban level features a dual exhaust system, 17-inch, five-twin spoke light-alloy wheels, multi-function leather steering wheel as well as a leather gear shift, a different instrument cluster, and contrasting topstitching placed in specific areas. The AMG Line (AMG Sport until 2015) remains the same as the UK-spec model.

=== Australia ===
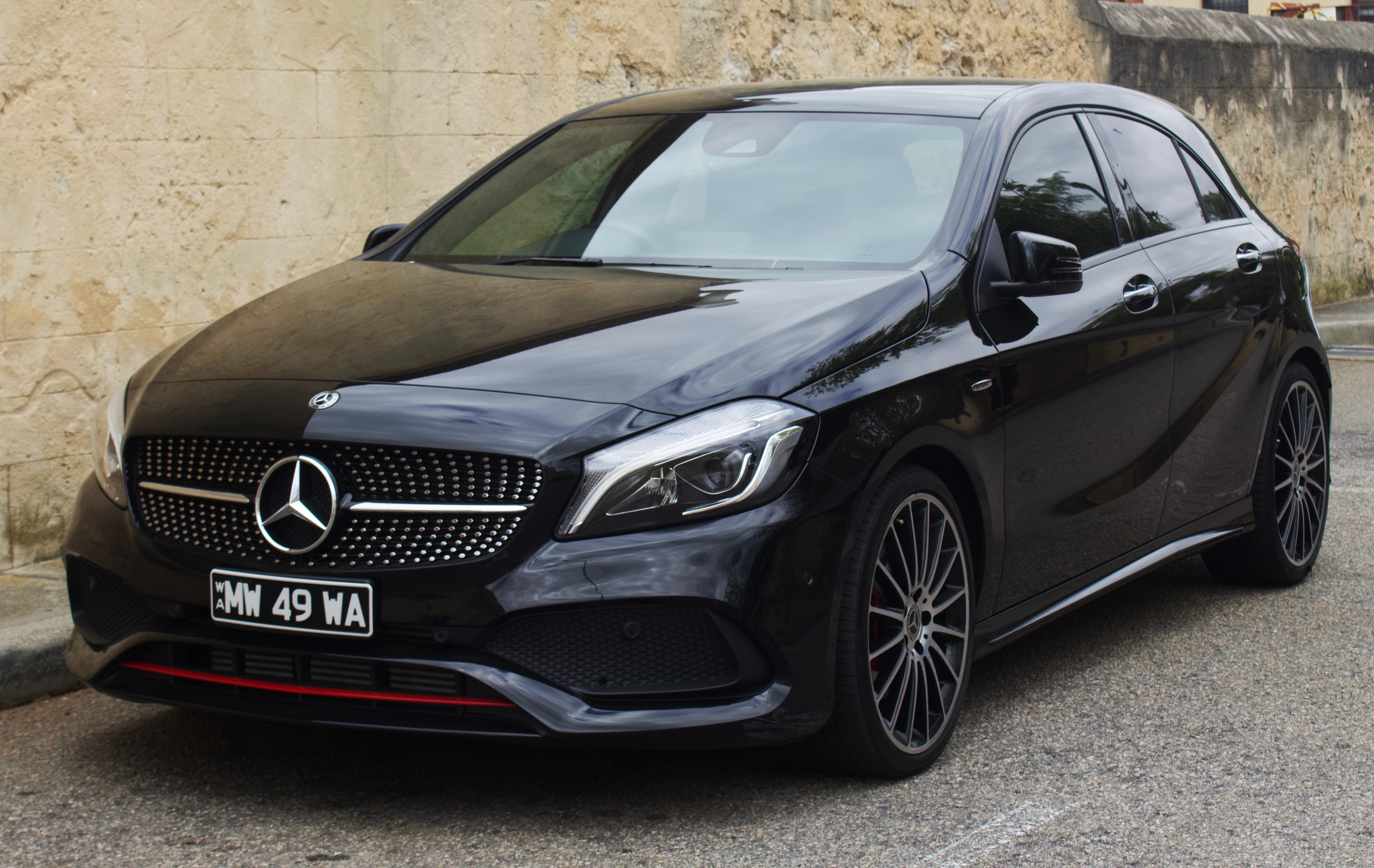
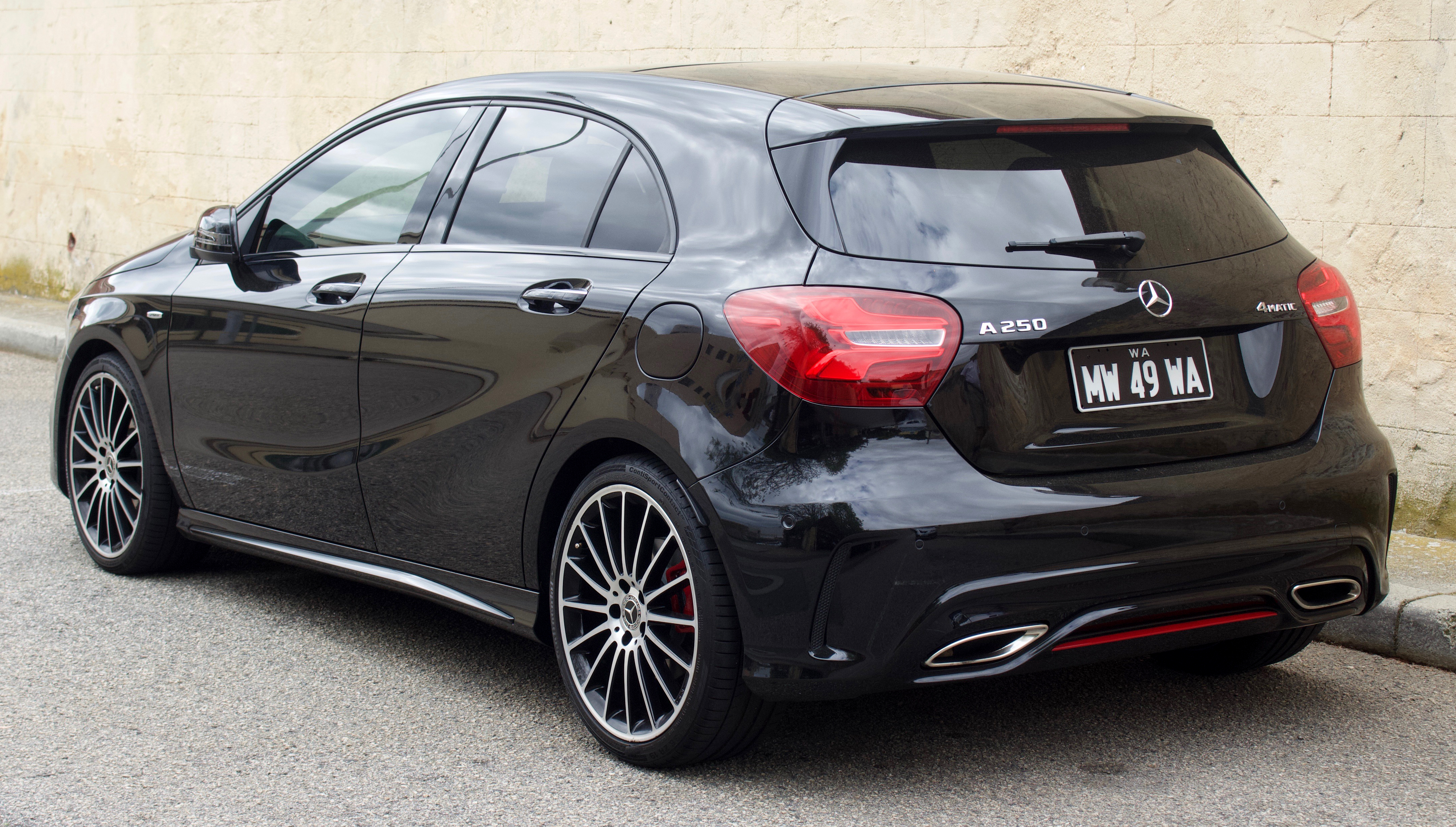
2015-2017 Mercedes-Benz A 250 Sport (Australia; facelift)

In Australia, trim levels are sold as models (A 180, A 200, A 200 CDI, A 250 Sport). The A 180 which is powered by a 1.6-litre M270 DE16 engine, features 17-inch five-twin spoke alloy wheels with 225/45R17 run-flat tires, six speaker sound system, six-disc CD changer, 14.7 cm (5.8 in) colour display, auxiliary USB inputs and Bluetooth audio streaming, climate control A/C, cruise control, Messancy fabric with Artico synthetic leather, front and rear parking sensors, automatic headlights, Bluetooth mobile phone connectivity, remote central locking, power windows and heated mirrors, ambient lighting and tinted windows. The A 200, powered by the M270 DE16, as well as the diesel-powered A 200 CDI, powered by either a 1.8-litre OM651, or the higher-spec 2.1-litre OM651 DE22, adds 18-inch five twin-spoke alloy wheels in a bi-colour black paired with 225/40R18 tires, four-way power adjustable rear seats, Larochette and Artico seat upholstery, Nappa leather steering wheel, power folding door mirrors, automatically dimming rear and door mirrors. The range-topping A 250 Sport powered by the 2.0-litre M270 DE20, adds 18-inch five twin-spoke AMG-style wheels paired with 235/40R18 tires, Artico and Dinamica microfiber seats, perforated front brake discs, AMG sport suspension, and a panoramic power sunroof and privacy glass.

== A 45 AMG ==
The A 45 AMG is a performance version of the A-Class, fitted with a 2-litre four-cylinder turbo engine rated at 381 PS (280 kW; 376 hp) at 6000 rpm and 475 N⋅m (350 lbf⋅ft) at 2250-5000 rpm, AMG Speedshift DCT 7-speed sports transmission with Momentary M mode, 4MATIC all-wheel drive, 3-stage ESP with ESP Curve Dynamic Assist and "ESP Sport Handling" mode, AMG sports suspension with independently developed front and rear axles, high-performance braking system with 350 x 32 millimetres front brake discs and 330 x 22 millimetres rear brake discs, and is identifiable by the "twin blade" radiator grille, AMG light-alloy wheels in twin-spoke design and two square chrome-plated tailpipes.

With 381 PS (280 kW; 376 hp), the A 45 and its derivation vehicles, CLA 45 and GLA 45, had the highest specific output per litre of 187.5 horsepower per litre for a four-cylinder motor in the passenger car sector at the time of their introduction. The Bugatti Chiron has the same specific output as A 45.

The vehicle was originally announced to be unveiled in the first quarter of 2013, but was later unveiled at the Geneva Motor Show. The sales release date was set for 8 April 2013, with Germany marketing beginning in June 2013.

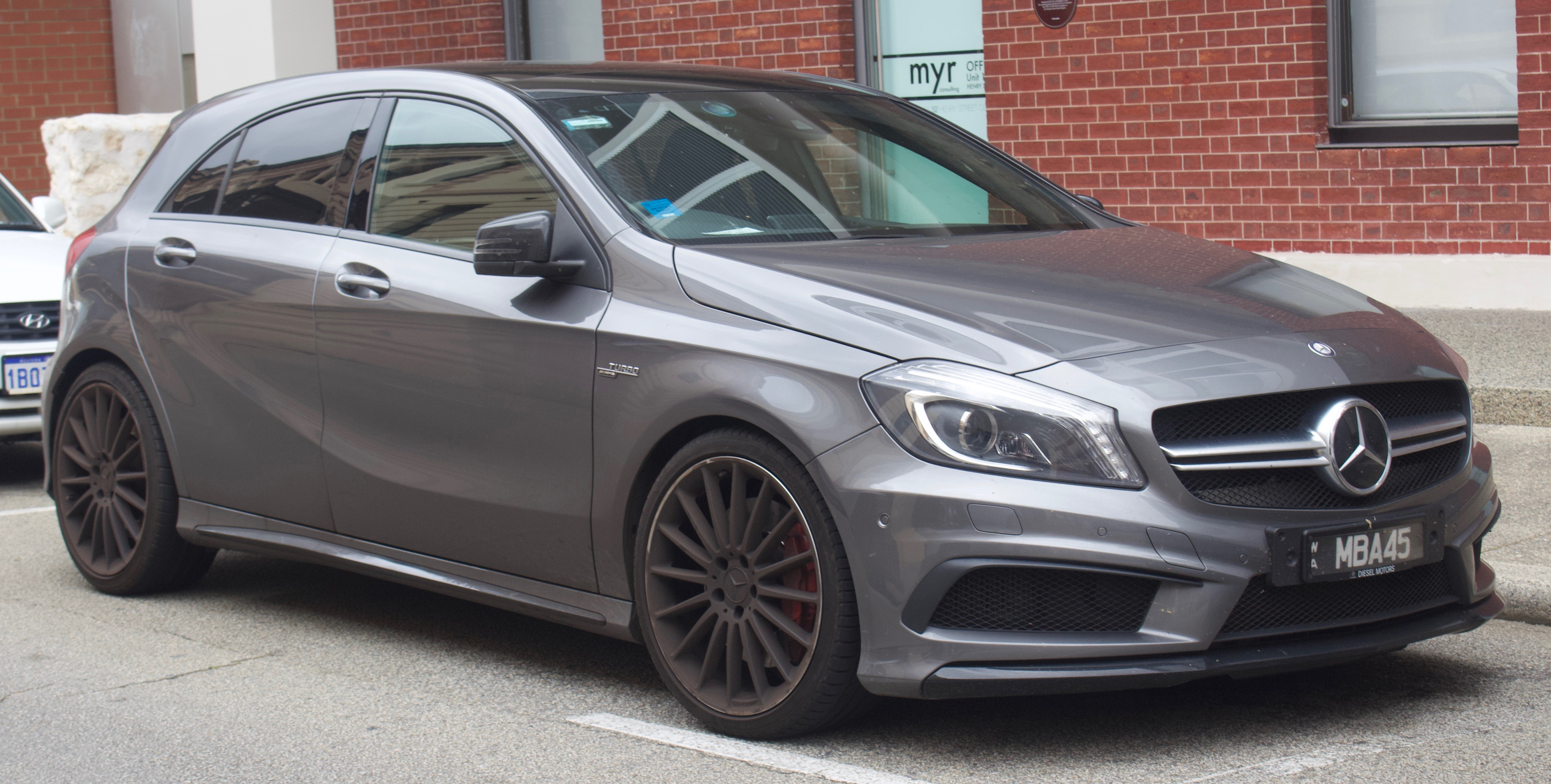
Mercedes-Benz A 45 AMG (Australia; pre-facelift)

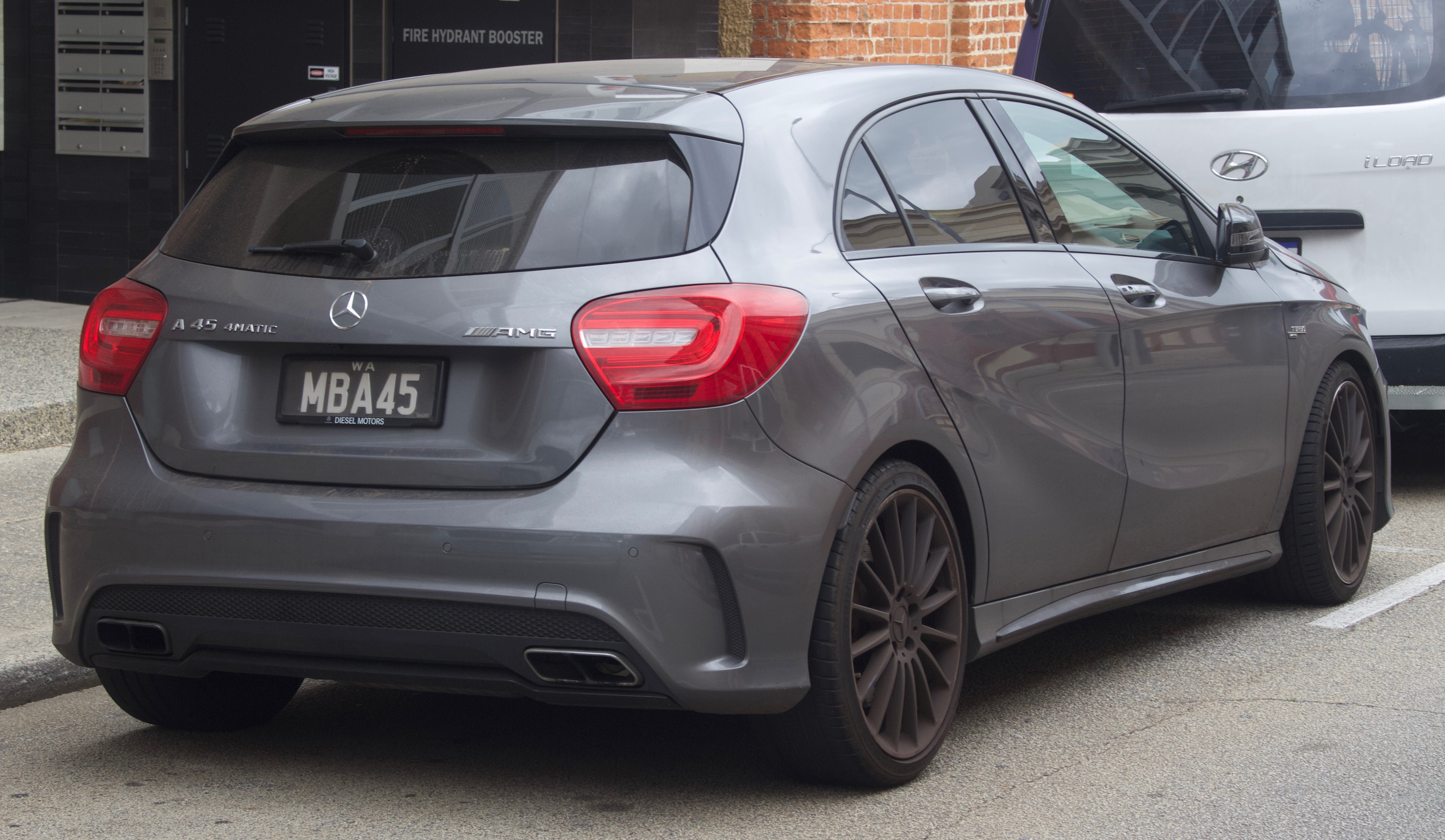
Mercedes-Benz A 45 AMG (Australia; pre-facelift)

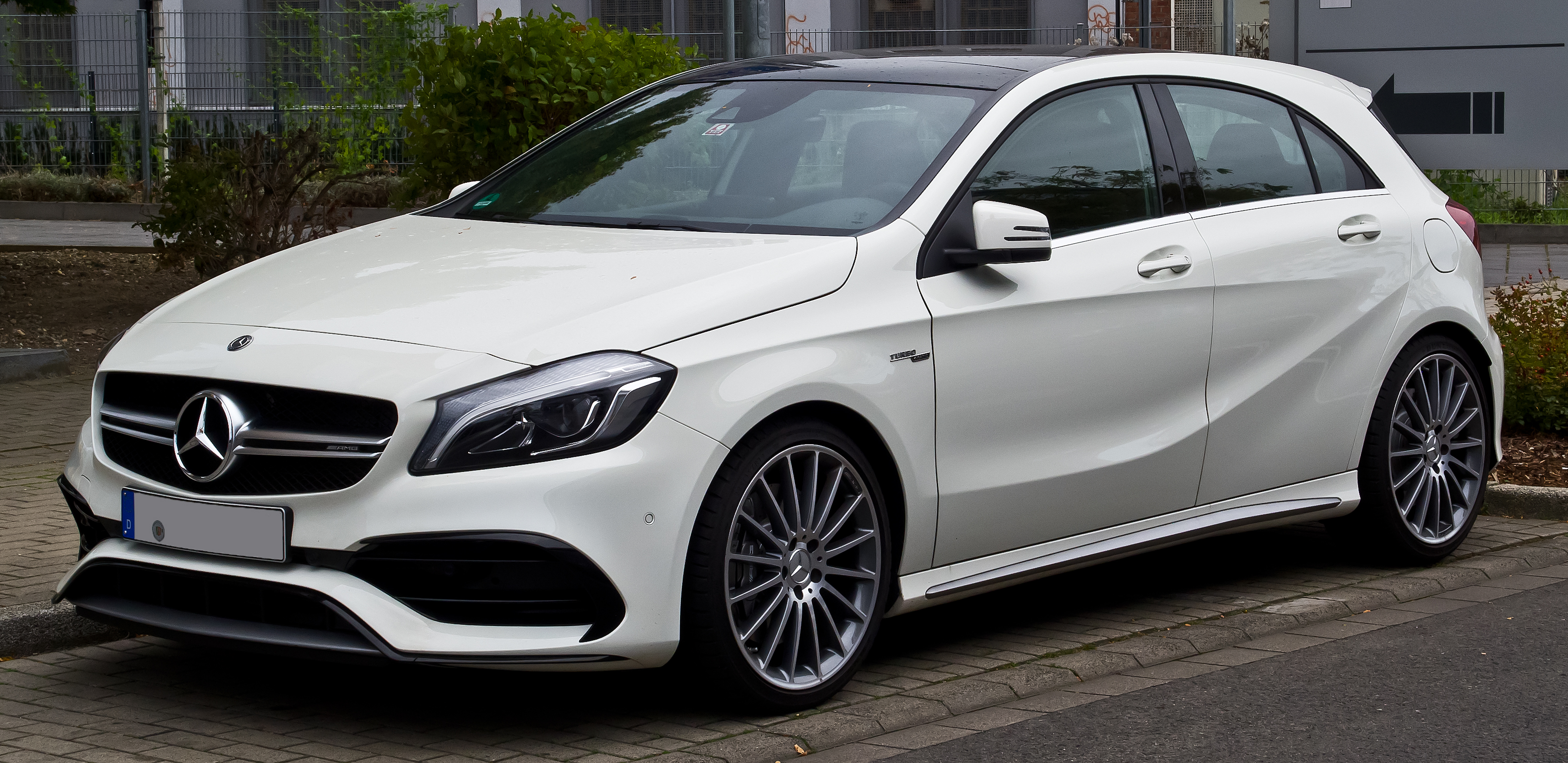
Mercedes-Benz A 45 AMG (Europe; facelift)

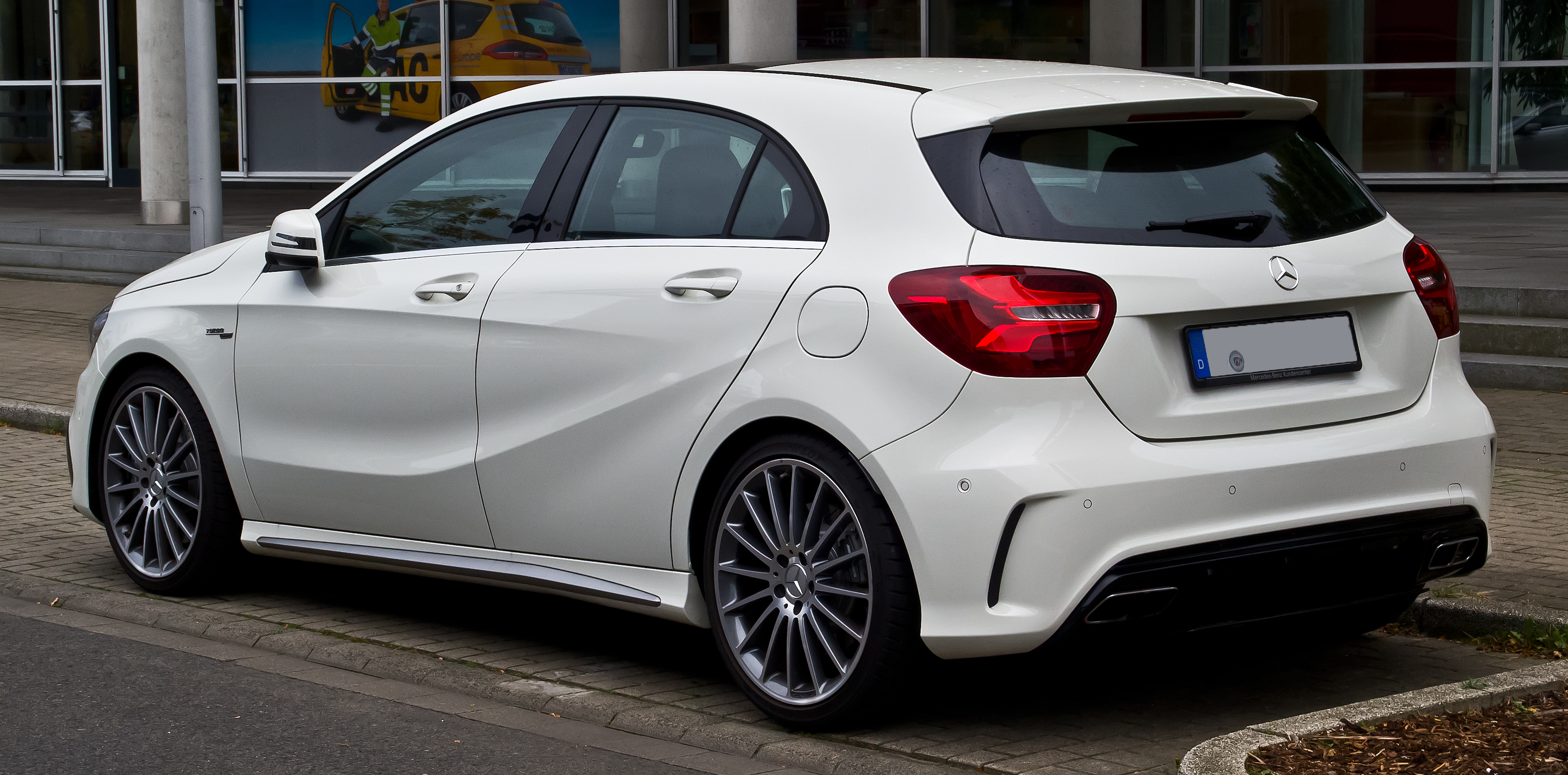
Mercedes-Benz A 45 AMG (Europe; facelift)

== Facelift ==
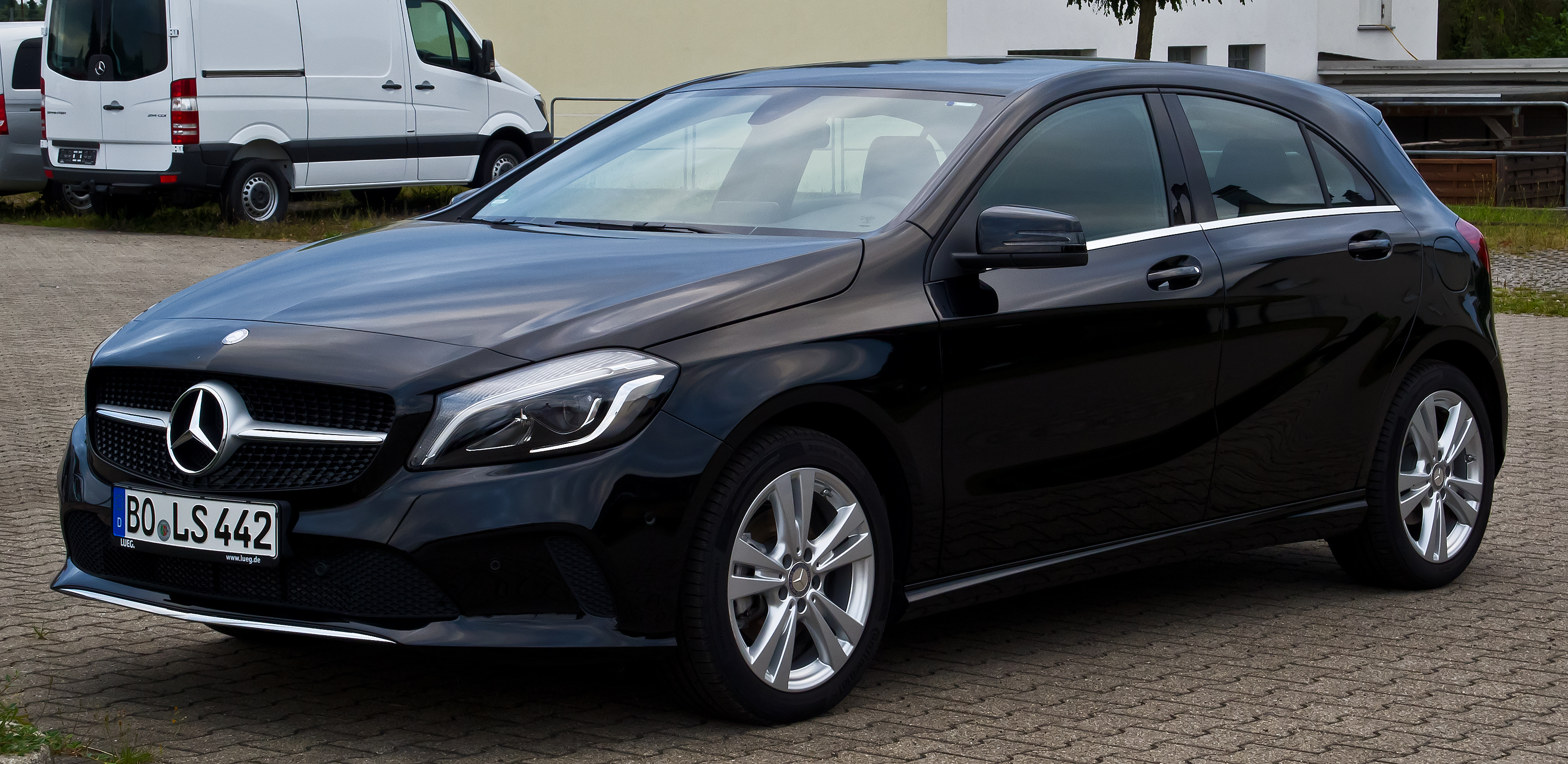
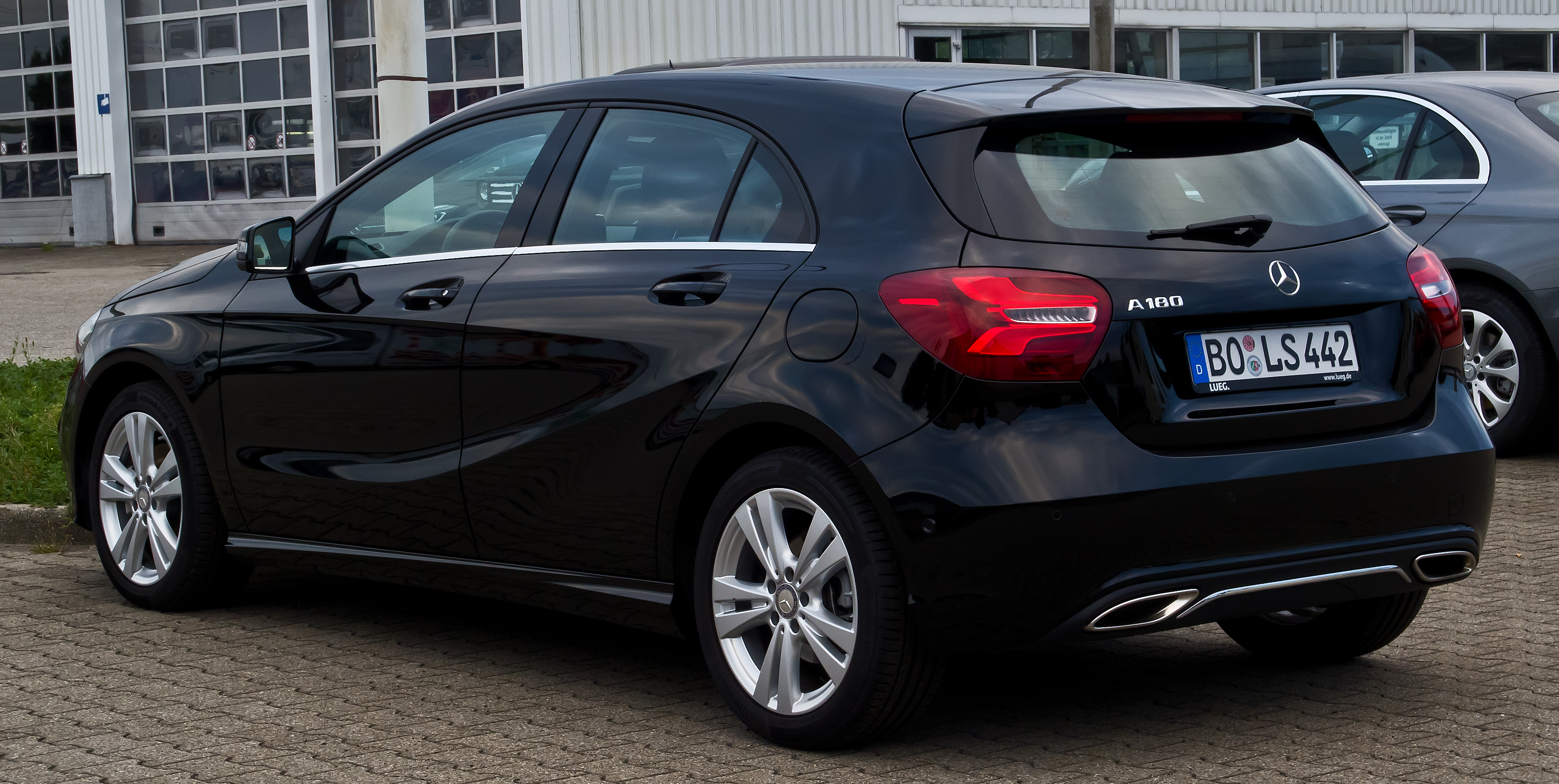
2016 Mercedes-Benz A 180 Urban (Germany; facelift)

Revealed on 27 June 2015, and commencing production in September 2015, was the facelifted W 176 A-Class. Aesthetic changes were implemented to the headlights and taillights, designed to bring the A-Class closer in line to the W205 C-Class. The facelifted model also offers adaptive damping for the first time and the "Dynamic Select" mode, which offers different options including: Comfort, Sport, Eco, and Individual, which all change the way the car acts. On the A45, the Sport+ mode replaces the Eco. The model also features a new diamond-pattern front grille, different taillight clusters, updated front and rear bumpers, and integrated tailpipes. The A- and B- class are also brought in line with the nomenclature of other Mercedes-Benz vehicles, meaning diesel models no longer bear the CDI plate, but instead use the "d" suffix (example: B 220 CDI → B 220d).

The facelifted model also brings slightly changed engines. Inside, a larger 8-inch screen is available on higher trim levels. A range of new interior colours is available and ambient lighting is optional. The all-wheel drive system receives a new seven-speed dual-clutch transmission with shorter ratios for third to seventh gears as well as updated technology for which AMG officials state features "improved response and shift action". The 180d (previously 180 CDI) update has notable fuel economy improvements, decreasing its combined consumption and CO_{2} emissions to 80.7mpg and 89g/km respectively.

The A 45 model adds a Dynamic Plus package that adds a mechanical locking front differential. With this package, the A 45 receives a claimed 0–100 km/h (0–62 mph) of 4.2 seconds, 0.1 faster than the 2015 Audi RS3 and 0.4 seconds faster than the pre-facelift model.

== Drivetrains ==
=== Engines ===
All W176 units are powered by a range of straight-four engines, offered in either petrol and diesel guises, with the 1.5-litre diesel engines supplied by a Renault unit.

Petrol engines
Model	Years	Type/code	Power at rpm, Torque at rpm
A 160	2017-2018	1,595 cc (97.3 cu in) I4 turbo (M 270 DE 16 AL red.)	102 PS (75 kW; 101 hp) at 4,500-6000, 180 N⋅m (133 lbf⋅ft) at 1,250–3,500
A 180 BlueEFFICIENCY	2012–2018	1,595 cc (97.3 cu in) I4 turbo (M 270 DE 16 AL red.)	122 PS (90 kW; 120 hp) at 5,000, 200 N⋅m (148 lbf⋅ft) at 1,250–4,000
A 200 BlueEFFICIENCY	2012–2018	1,595 cc (97.3 cu in) I4 turbo (M 270 DE 16 AL)	156 PS (115 kW; 154 hp) at 5,000, 250 N⋅m (184 lbf⋅ft) at 1,250–4,000
A 220 4MATIC DCT	2015-2018	1,991 cc (121.5 cu in) I4 turbo (M 270 DE 20 AL)	180 PS (135 kW; 184 hp) at 5,500, 300 N⋅m (221 lbf⋅ft) at 1200-4000
A 250 BlueEFFICIENCY	2012–2018	1,991 cc (121.5 cu in) I4 turbo (M 270 DE 20 AL)	211 PS (155 kW; 208 hp) at 5,500, 350 N⋅m (258 lbf⋅ft) at 1,200–4,000
A 250 4MATIC BlueEFFICIENCY	2013–2018	1,991 cc (121.5 cu in) I4 turbo (M 270 DE 20 AL)	211 PS (155 kW; 208 hp) at 5,500, 350 N⋅m (258 lbf⋅ft) at 1,200–4,000
A 250 Sport	2012–2018	1,991 cc (121.5 cu in) I4 turbo (M 270 DE 20 AL)	211 PS (155 kW; 208 hp) at 5,500, 350 N⋅m (258 lbf⋅ft) at 1,200–4,000
A 45 AMG	2013–2015	1,991 cc (121.5 cu in) I4 twin-scroll turbo (M 133 DE 20 AL)	360 PS (265 kW; 355 hp) at 6,000, 450 N⋅m (332 lbf⋅ft) at 2,250–5,000
A 45 AMG (Facelift)	2015–2018	1,991 cc (121.5 cu in) I4 twin-scroll turbo (M 133 DE 20 AL)	381 PS (280 kW; 376 hp) at 6,000, 475 N⋅m (350 lbf⋅ft) at 2,250–5,000

Diesel engines
Model	Years	Type/code	Power at rpm, Torque at rpm
A 160 CDI	2013–2018	1,461 cc (89.2 cu in) I4 turbo (OM 607 DE 15 LA)	90 PS (66 kW; 89 hp) at 4,000, 220 N⋅m (162 lbf⋅ft) at 1,750–2,750
A 180 CDI BlueEFFICIENCY (OM 607)	2012–2018	1,461 cc (89.2 cu in) I4 turbo (OM 607 DE 15 LA)	109 PS (80 kW; 108 hp) at 4,000, 260 N⋅m (192 lbf⋅ft) at 1,750–2,500
A 180 CDI BlueEFFICIENCY (OM 651) (7G-DCT Only)	2012–2014	1,796 cc (109.6 cu in) I4 turbo (OM 651 DE 18 LA red.)	109 PS (80 kW; 108 hp) at 3,200–4,600, 250 N⋅m (184 lbf⋅ft) at 1,400–2,800
A 200 CDI BlueEFFICIENCY	2012–2014	1,796 cc (109.6 cu in) I4 turbo (OM 651 DE 18 LA)	136 PS (100 kW; 134 hp) at 3,600–4,400, 300 N⋅m (221 lbf⋅ft) at 1,600–3,000
A 200 CDI BlueEFFICIENCY	2014–2018	2,143 cc (130.8 cu in) I4 turbo (OM 651 DE 22 LA)	136 PS (100 kW; 134 hp) at 3,400–4,400, 300 N⋅m (221 lbf⋅ft) at 1,400–3,400
A 220 CDI BlueEFFICIENCY	2012–2014	2,143 cc (130.8 cu in) I4 turbo (OM 651 DE 22 LA)	170 PS (125 kW; 168 hp) at 3,000–4,200, 350 N⋅m (258 lbf⋅ft) at 1,600–3,000
A 220 CDI BlueEFFICIENCY	2014–2018	2,143 cc (130.8 cu in) I4 turbo (OM 651 DE 22 LA)	170 PS (125 kW; 168 hp) at 3,400–4,000, 350 N⋅m (258 lbf⋅ft) at 1,400–3,400

=== Transmissions ===
The W176 comes standard on most models as a 6-speed manual internally codenamed F-SG 310. It is a 3-shaft transmission with a length of 345 mm (13.6 in). The output shaft for gears three, four and R is supplied with oil through oil ducts. This reduces the drag torque. Shift comfort is also improved, primarily at low temperatures. To further reduce shift forces, the aluminium shift forks, which are weight optimized, are supported on the shift rods with Babbitt bearings. The main shifter shaft position sensor (magnetic induction) and a permanent magnet placed on the main shifter shaft detect the neutral position of the transmission for controlling the eco start/stop function. All transmissions feature a two-mass flywheel for extra comfort.

The dual-clutch 7G-DCT replaces the 7-speed continuously variable transmission of the previous model. The unit is a three-shaft gearbox, which feature a multi-plate clutch, which allows shifting without loss of any tractive force. The gear ratio was chosen to be high at 7.99 in order to provide sufficient torque in lower gears and simultaneously reduce the speeds in the higher gears. This 7G-DCT unit is 367 mm (14.4 in) long and weighs 86 kg (190 lb). The hydraulics of the mechanical parking lock are controlled electronically, allowing the transmission selector lever to be positioned on the right behind the steering wheel. This allows for extra space in the centre console. Transmissions are available to work in three mode: Economy, Sport, and Manual. The Economy mode was made for fuel-saving driving. The Sport mode has reaction times shortened for an overall sporty drive. In Manual, the driver can manually change using integral steering wheel gearshift paddles, positioned behind the steering wheel.

For the 7-speed 7G-DCT, while running the Eco mode, the front axle receives the most torque in normal conditions, while in Sport and Manual modes, activation time to the rear axle increases, providing more torque to offer greater rear wheel dynamics. The ergonomic "DIRECT SELECT" lever as well as the cruise control and SPEEDTRONIC systems are also take part in the system of the 7G-DCT dual clutch transmission.

Transmissions
Model	Years	Standard	Optional
A 180 BlueEfficiency	2012–2018	6-speed manual	7-speed automatic (7G-DCT)
A 180 BlueEfficiency Edition	2013–2018	6-speed manual	n/a
A 200 BlueEfficiency	2012–2018	6-speed manual	7-speed automatic (7G-DCT)
A 250 4MATIC BlueEfficiency	2013–2018	7-speed automatic (7G-DCT)	n/a
A 250 BlueEfficiency	2012–2018	7-speed automatic (7G-DCT)	n/a
A 250 Sport	2012–2018	7-speed automatic (7G-DCT)	n/a
A 45 AMG	2013–2018	7-speed automatic (AMG Speedshift DCT)	n/a
A 160 CDI	2013–2018	6-speed manual	7-speed automatic (7G-DCT)
A 180 CDI BlueEfficiency (OM 607)	2012–2018	6-speed manual	7-speed automatic (7G-DCT) (2014–)
A 180 CDI BlueEfficiency Edition	2013–2018	6-speed manual	n/a
A 180 CDI BlueEfficiency (OM 651)	2012–2014	7-speed automatic (7G-DCT)	n/a
A 200 CDI BlueEfficiency	2012–2018	6-speed manual	7-speed automatic (7G-DCT)
A 220 CDI BlueEfficiency	2012–2018	7-speed automatic (7G-DCT)	n/a

== Marketing ==
As part of the A-Class launch, Mercedes-Benz started the 'A Rock' concert series with British alternative rock band Placebo. The 5-concert tour took place in Paris, Rome, Zurich, Hamburg, Madrid between June and July 2012.

Mercedes-Benz Japan had created a short anime titled "Next A-Class", ahead of the A-Class launch in Japan.

== Safety ==
=== Euro NCAP ===
In a Euro NCAP testing conducted in 2014, the model had received a five star rating.

Euro NCAP Test Results
Star rating:			
Type:	A 180 Urban (LHD 1320 kg)		
Test	Points	Out of	%
Adult rating:	33.4	38	93%
Child occupant:	39.6	49	81%
Pedestrian:	24.0	48	67%
Safety assist:	6.0	13	86%

=== ANCAP ===
ANCAP test results* Mercedes-Benz A-Class (2013)
Test	Score
Overall	5 /5 stars
Frontal offset	14.80/16
Side impact	16/16
Pole	2/2
Seat belt reminders	3/3
Whiplash protection	Good
Pedestrian protection	Adequate
Electronic stability control	Standard

== Awards ==
The W176 had won "The Most Beautiful Car of the Year 2012" award. This was voted out by 100,000 car enthusiasts across 52 countries via seven websites.
