= Berry Amendment =

Department of Defense "buy-American" policy

The Berry Amendment (10 U.S.C. § 2533a, currently 10 U.S.C. § 4862), requires the US Department of Defense (DoD) to give preference in procurement to domestically produced, manufactured, or home-grown products, most notably food, clothing, fabrics, and specialty metals. Congress originally passed domestic source restrictions as part of the 1941 Fifth Supplemental DOD Appropriations Act in order to protect the domestic industrial base in the time of war.

== History ==
The Defense Federal Acquisition Regulation Supplement (DFARS) was amended to include exceptions for the acquisition of food, specialty metals, and hand or measuring tools when needed to support contingency operations or when the use of other-than-competitive procedures is based on an unusual and compelling urgency. The specialty metals provision was added in 1973. This provision requires that specialty metals incorporated in products delivered under DOD contracts be melted in the United States or a “qualifying country”. Specialty metals include certain steel, titanium, zirconium and other metal alloys that are important to the DOD.

On April 10, 2007, the Undersecretary of Defense for Acquisition, Technology and Logistics determined that most compliant fasteners could not be obtained in sufficient quantity without unreasonably delaying production, and exempted most fasteners from the requirement.

Congress has since revised the Berry Amendment in the Fiscal Year 2007 and Fiscal Year 2008 National Defense Authorization Acts. The revised statute now includes exemptions for certain Commercial-Off-The-Shelf (COTS) items, a de minimis exception for small amounts of non-domestic metal (excluding high-performance magnets), a market basket approach to measuring the amount of domestic metal content in articles delivered to DOD, and a national security waiver to prevent the delay in delivery of critically needed systems to troops in combat. Additionally, the blanket exemption for fasteners was removed by Congress, now requiring that at least 50% of commercial fastener specialty metal content be domestic. Finally, Congress required that all waivers or Domestic Non-Availability Determinations (DNADs) be reviewed and revised to comply with the amended law.

The original 10 U.S.C. 2533a now excludes specialty metals and applies generally to textile materials.

American Recovery and Reinvestment Act (H.R. 1), passed by both houses of Congress on February 13, 2009, included legislation offered by Congressman Larry Kissell (D-NC) mandating that any textile and apparel products contracted by the U.S. Department of Homeland Security's (DHS) be manufactured in the United States with 100 percent U.S. inputs. The "Kissell Amendment" was modeled on and picks up, with little or no modification, many of the specific provisions of the Berry Amendment.

== Naming ==
The Berry Amendment was named for Ellis Yarnal Berry, who was a member of the U.S. House of Representatives from 1951 to 1971. During his first term in congress, Berry introduced an amendment to the Buy American Act to expand the law to cover all clothing, cotton, and wool. Ever since 1952 any restrictions in the annual Defense Appropriation Acts became known as Berry Amendments. The Berry Amendment became permanent in 1994 by section 8005 of Public Law (Pub. L.) 103–139.

== See also ==
- Federal Acquisition Regulation
- Government procurement in the United States
