= List of mortar carriers =

A mortar carrier, or self-propelled mortar, is a self-propelled artillery piece in which a mortar is the primary weapon.

== Summary list ==
=== Modern era mortar systems ===
==== Mortar carrier 81–82 mm ====
Weapon name	Caliber [mm]	Country of origin	Source
2S41 Drok	82 mm	Russia	
PCP-001	82 mm	China	
ALKAR (Aselsan)	81 mm	Turkey	
Carrier Mortar Tracked (CMT)	81 mm	India	
Cardom 81	81 mm	Israel	
Dual EIMOS	81 mm	Spain	
ESLAIT A3MS	81 mm	Austria / Israel	
VingPos	81 mm	Norway	
K281	81 mm	South Korea	

==== Mortar carrier 120 mm ====
Weapon name	Caliber [mm]	Country of origin	Source
120 KRH-TEKA	120 mm	Finland	
120 Mobile mortar system	120 mm	Georgia	
2R2M mortar	120 mm	France	
2S31 Vena	120 mm	Russia	
2S34 Khosta	120 mm	Russia	
2S39 Magnolia	120 mm	Russia	
2S40 Floks	120 mm	Russia	
2S42 Lotos	120 mm	Russia	
Alakran	120 mm	Spain	
AHS-120 (Aselsan)	120 mm	Turkey	
AMOS (Patria) (2 barrels)	120 mm × 2	Finland; Sweden	
AMS II	120 mm	United Kingdom; United States	
Cardom 120	120mm	Israel	
Cobra (RUAG)	120 mm	Switzerland	
Crossbow 120	120mm	Israel	
Elbit SPEAR	120 mm	Israel	
EMOC	120 mm	Spain	
ESLAIT A3MS	120 mm	Austria	
GMM-120	120 mm	Georgia	
GMOS (Escribano) "Guardian MOrtar System"	120 mm	Spain	
MEPAC	120 mm	France	
KSM120 Skyfall	120 mm	South Korea	
M1064 mortar carrier	120 mm	United States	
M1129 mortar carrier	120 mm	United States	
M120 Mortar – Wiesel 2	120 mm	Germany	
M1287 mortar carrier	120 mm	USA	
Grkpbv 90 (2 barrels)	120 mm × 2	Sweden	
MMC Bars-8	120 mm	Ukraine	
NEMO (Patria)	120 mm	Finland	
PLL-05	120 mm	China	
PLZ-10	120 mm	China	
Ragnarok MWS120	120 mm	Norway	
M120 Rak	120 mm	Poland	
M69 Rak	120 mm	Poland	
SAM120	120 mm	Slovakia	
SLING	120 mm	Israel	
Smereka	120 mm	Ukraine	
SRAMS "Super Rapid Advanced Mortar System"	120 mm	Singapore	
Type 96 120 mm self-propelled mortar	120 mm	Japan	
VCTM	120 mm	Argentina	

=== Cold War ===
Weapon name	Caliber [mm]	Country of origin	Source
2S4 Tyulpan	240 mm	Soviet Union	
2S9 Nona	120 mm	Soviet Union	
2S23 Nona-SVK	120 mm	Soviet Union	
K242A1	107 mm	South Korea	
M106 mortar carrier	107 mm	United States	
Type 60 107 mm self-propelled mortar	107 mm	Japan	
Type 60 81 mm self-propelled mortar	81 mm	Japan	
Vz.85 ShM-120 PRAM-S	120 mm	Czechoslovakia	

=== World War II era mortar carriers ===
Weapon name	Caliber [mm]	Country of origin	Source
M4 MMC – M2 half-track	81 mm	United States	
M4A1 MMC M2 half-track	81 mm	United States	
M21 MMC M3 half-track	81 mm	United States	
Reihenwerfer - SOMUA MCG	81 mm × 16	France / Nazi Germany	.
Karl-Gerät Neubau-fahrzeug	540/600 mm	Nazi Germany	

== Detailed list ==
=== Modern era mortar carrier ===
This list includes mortar carrier systems that were developed after the Cold War.

==== Mortar carrier 81 mm ====
Mortar system	Platform	Calibre [mm]	Origin mortar system	Image	Quantity		Service life	Users (deliveries by client)	Note
Mortar system	Platform	Calibre [mm]	Origin mortar system	Image	Order	Delivery	Service life	Users (deliveries by client)	Note
ALKAR	Defender	81 mm	Turkey	―	―	―	In development	(Turkey) Turkish Army	System made by Aselsan, planned to be ordered by the Turkish Army
Carrier Mortar Tracked (CMT)	BMP-2	81 mm	India Israel		220	220	Since 2000	(India) Indian Army	System made by DRDO and OFMK, fitted with IOF81 Type 1F tube (Indian licensed version of Soltam B455)
Cardom 81 – EIMOS	URO VAMTAC S3 BN-2	81 mm	Israel		16	16	Since 2012	(Spain) Spanish Army (10) (Bahrain) Bahraini Army (6)	System by Soltam. Being replaced by the URO VAMTAC - Dual EIMOS in the Spanish Army.
Dual EIMOS	URO VAMTAC ST5	81 mm	Spain	―	80	2	Since 2022	(Spain) Spanish Army (Spain) Spanish Marines	System by Expal
ESLAIT A3MS "SCORPION"	URO VAMTAC ST5	81 mm	Austria	―	Unknown	Unknown	Unknown	(Oman) Omani Sultan's Special Force	ESL Advanced Information Technology (ESLAIT), further evolution of the Cardom 10
VingPos	CV90 Mk.I RWS Multi BK	81 mm	Norway	―	24	16	Since 2016	(Norway) Norwegian Army	System made by Rheinmetall Norway AS, fitted with L16A2 mortar tube

==== Mortar carrier 120 mm ====
Mortar system	Platform	Calibre [mm]	Origin mortar system	Image	Quantity		Service life	Users (deliveries by client)	Note
Mortar system	Platform	Calibre [mm]	Origin mortar system	Image	Order	Delivery	Service life	Users (deliveries by client)	Note
120 Mobile mortar system	Didgori Meomari	120 mm	Georgia		Unknown	Unknown	2021	Exported to unknown user in the Middle East	Mortar made by Delta SEC
2R2M mortar	Freccia VBM Porta Mortaio	120 mm	France		35	21	2015	(Italy) Italian Army	System made by Thales (formerly TDA)
2R2M mortar "Griffon MEPAC"	VBMR Griffon	120 mm	France		54	0	From 2024	(France) French Army	System made by Thales (formerly TDA)
2R2M mortar	VAB Mk.3 (6x6)	120 mm	France	―	6	6	2009	Royal Army of Oman	System designed and made by Thales (formerly TDA)
2R2M mortar	ACV-300	120 mm	France		8	8	2010	(Malaysia) Malaysian Army	System designed and made by Thales (formerly TDA)
2R2M mortar	DefTech AV8	120 mm	France	―	8	8	2019	(Malaysia) Malaysian Army	System designed and made by Thales (formerly TDA)
2R2M mortar	M113	120 mm	France	―	25	25	2010	(Saudi Arabia) Saudi Arabian National Guard	System designed and made by Thales (formerly TDA)
AHS-120	BMC VuranEjder Yalçın	120 mm	Turkey		> 26	> 26	Since 2021	(Turkey) Turkish Army (unknown) (Turkey) Turkish Gendarmerie (unknown); Kosovo Army (26)	System made by Aselsan, initially named Alkar, renamed AHS-120.
Alakran mortar system /	Toyota Land Cruiser J79	120 mm	Spain	―	6	6	Since 2023	(Ukraine) Ukrainian Army	Ordered in 2023 for the Ukrainian Army
Alakran mortar system /	URO VAMTAC S3	120 mm	Spain	―	1	1	Only trial	(Spain) Spanish Army	Tested by the Spanish Army in 2018
Alakran mortar system / A2M (Advanced Mobile Mortar)	Sherpa Light	120 mm	Spain; France	―	―	―	In development	―	Developed by Thales (mortar), Arquus (vehicle) and NTGS (Alakran)
Alakran MMK BARS-8	Bars-8 (Dodge RAM chassis)	120 mm	SpainUkraine		> 12	> 12	Since 2019	(Ukraine) Ukrainian Army	
AMOS (2 barrels)	Patria AMV	120 mm × 2	Finland/ Sweden		18	18	2013	(Finland) Finnish Army	System designed and made by Patria and BAE Hägglunds
AMS II "Advanced Mobile Mortar"	LAV III	120 mm	United KingdomUnited States		73	73	Since 2002	(Saudi Arabia) Saudi Arabian National Guard	Weapon system developed by Delco Systems and Royal Ordonance
Cobra – RUAG	Piranha IV	120 mm	Switzerland		48	0	From 2024	(Switzerland) Swiss Army	"12 cm Mörser 16"
Cobra – RUAG	PARS III 8x8	120 mm	Switzerland		6	6	Since 2019	Royal Army of Oman	
Crossbow 120	Boxer	120 mm	Israel	―	―	―	In development	―	Turret for a mortar carrier ready for trial as of 2023, designed by Elbit for Israeli Army, and export as well. Tested on Boxer.
EMOC	VAC ASCOD 2	120 mm (or 81 mm)	Spain	―	―	―	Prototype	―	Lightest 120 mm mortar carrier
ESLAIT A3MS	Piranha V	120 mm	AustriaIsrael		15	15	Since 2019	(Denmark) Danish Army	Piranha V AAAMS "Advanced Automated Autonomous Mortar System", further evolution of the Cardom 10 by Austrian company ESLAIT
GMM-120	Modified MAN KAT1	120 mm	Georgia		―	―	Prototype	―	Made by STC Delta
GMOS "Guardian MOrtar System"	VAC ASCOD 2	120 mm	Spain	―	―	―	Prototype	―	Escribano developed a turret to answer the coming needs of the Spanish Army, expected to be used with the Piranha V and / or the VAC (ASCOD 2 based APC)
KSM120 Skyfall	K200A1	120 mm	South Korea	—	Unknown	Unknown	Since January 2022	(South Korea) South Korean Army	Ordered in 2020 and then in 2022, intended to replace the 1840 KM30 in service (K-242A1 with 107 mm M30 mortar) Announced to be in mass production.
M1064 mortar carrier	M113	120 mm	IsraelUnited States		1124	1124	Since 1990	(United States) US Army (1076) (Egypt) Egyptian Army(36) (Thailand) Royal Thai Army (12)	M113 equipped with M120 (Soltam K6) mortar
M120G Rak	Borsuk	120 mm	Poland		―	―	In development	―	Replacement of the Soviet mortars by this new system, mortar carriers split among the tracked Borsuk and the wheeled KTO Rosomak.
M120K Rak	KTO Rosomak	120 mm	Poland		146	93	2017	(Poland) Polish Land Forces (93 / 122) (Ukraine) Ukrainian Army (0 / 24)	Developed by Poland for its army, and purchased later on among a large KTO Rosomak for Ukraine
M1287	AMPV	120 mm	USA		386 (planned)	―	In trials	(United States) US Army	Among the 2,907 vehicles in 5 variants, the US Army expects 386 mortar carriers for quick-reaction fire support
Mjölner (2 barrels)	CV90 Grkpbv 90	120 mm × 2	Sweden		80	40	2019	(Sweden) Swedish Army	System designed and made by BAE Hägglunds Barrels produced by Slovak company KONSTRUKTA-Defence
PLL-05	ZSL92	120 mm	China		> 500	500	2008	(China) Chinese Army	
Ragnarok MWS120	Prototypes: trailer; Gidran; Boxer (RBSL's Mortar Boxer)	120 mm	Norway		―	―	In trial phase	―	Rheinmetall Norway AS developed this system. The Gidran was offered to Hungary, lost the competition, and a Boxer module is offered to the UK.
SLING	Land Rover Defender; Humvee	120 mm	Israel		―	―	Prototype / Testing phase	―	Tested by Green berets, based on M120A1 tube and base plate.
Smereka	Varta	120 mm	Ukraine		―	―	Prototype	―	Moroccan Army potentially interested
SPEAR SPEAR LR	JLTV, Humvee, SandCat, Tata LPTA	120 mm	Israel	―	> 28	> 28	2015	(Azerbaijan) Azerbaijani Army (–) (Zambia) Zambian Army (6) (Thailand) Royal Thai Army (34)	Thai ATMM and Zambian Spear Mk.2 on Tata LPTA 713 TC 4×4 trucks
SRAMS "Super Rapid Advanced Mortar System"	RG-31 Mk.5	120 mm	Singapore	―	48	48	―	United Arab Emirates Army	System designed and made by ST Engineering. (known as Agrab 120 in UAE Army)
SRAMS Mk.II "Super Rapid Advanced Mortar System"	Belrex PCSV	120 mm	Singapore	―	―	―	2021	Singapore Army	System designed and made by ST Engineering.
SRAMS Mk.II "Super Rapid Advanced Mortar System"	Prototypes Bronco 3 HumveeSpider	120 mm	Singapore	―	―	―	Prototype	Singapore Army	System designed and made by ST Engineering prototype

=== World War II era mortar carriers ===
Vehicle	Mortar system	Caliber [mm]	Origin	Image	Service life		Quantity	Users	Note
Vehicle	Mortar system	Caliber [mm]	Origin	Image	Start	End	Quantity	Users	Note
M4 MMC "M4 mortar motor carriage"	M2 half-track	81 mm	United States		1941	1945	572	(United States) US Army	System developed by the Ordnance Department, made by White Motor Companyfitted with the M1 Mortar
M4A1 MMC "M4A1 mortar motor carriage"	M2 half-track	81 mm	United States		1943	1945	600	(United States) US Army	System developed by the Ordnance Department, made by White Motor Companyfitted with the M1 Mortar.
M21 MMC "M21 mortar motor carriage"	M3 half-track	81 mm	United States		1944	1968	110	(United States) US Army (1944-1945, 110 made and used) (Free France) Free French forces (1945, 57 leased) (Austria) Austrian Army (1955-1968, 23 leased)	System developed by the Ordnance Department, made by White Motor Companyfitted with the M1 Mortar
Reihenwerfer	SOMUA MCG	81 mm × 16	FranceNazi Germany		1944	1945	Unknown	Wehrmacht	System developed and made by Alfred Becker, fitted with 16 mortars Brandt Mle 27/31.
Karl-Gerät	Neubau-fahrzeug	540 mm or 600 mm	Nazi Germany		1943	1945	7	Wehrmacht	System developed and made by Rheinmetall-Borsig AG.
