= VBMR Griffon =

French armoured personnel carrier

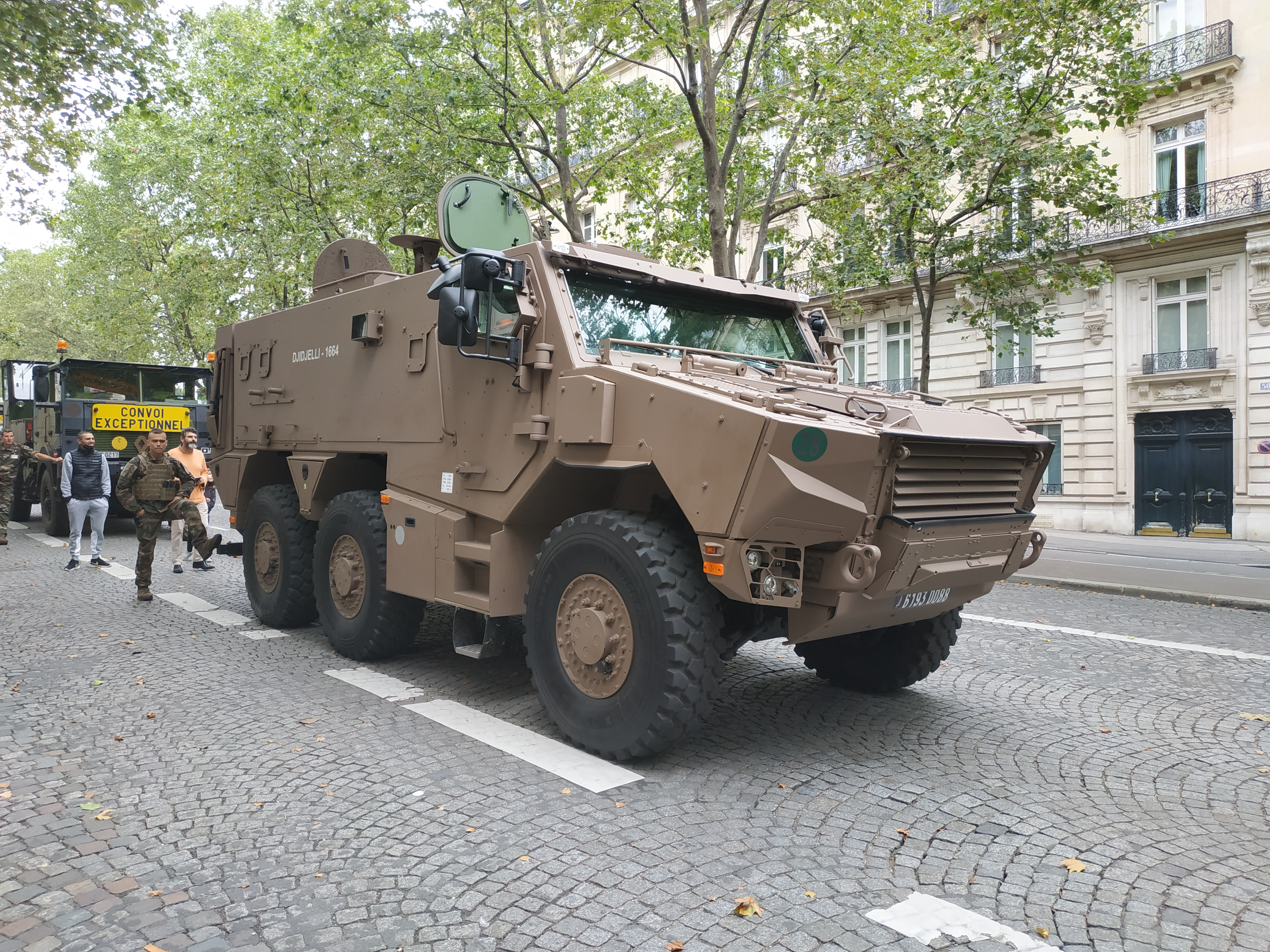
- A standard unarmed VBMR Griffon after the 2021 Bastille Day Parade (14 July 2021)
- Type: Multirole armoured personnel carrier
- Place of origin: France

Service history
- In service: 2019 – present
- Used by: France; Belgium

Production history
- Designer: KNDS France; Arquus; Thales
- Designed: 2010 - 2017
- Manufacturer: KNDS France; Arquus; Thales
- Unit cost: Griffon VTT (standard): €1.5 million (FY2017)
- Produced: 2018 - present
- No. built: 575 units as of 31 December 2023
- Variants: Armoured personnel carrier, command post, artillery observation, self-propelled mortar, medical evacuation, and associated subvariants

Specifications
- Mass: 25 tonnes
- Length: 7.6 m (24 ft 11 in)
- Width: 2.5 m (8 ft 2 in)
- Height: 3.7 m (12 ft 2 in)
- Crew: 2 (driver + gunner)
- Passengers: 8
- Armour: STANAG 4569 Level 4 (standard); Additional modular armour kits (optional)
- Main armament: T1 Hornet RWS with a 12.7 mm or 7.62 mm machine gun, or 40 mm automatic grenade launcher (standard variant); Akeron MP missiles, MEPAC mortar system, LLR 81mm mortar, etc (depending on the version)
- Secondary armament: GALIX self-protection system with 8 80 mm smoke grenade dischargers (all versions); T2 Hornet Lite RWS with a 7.62 mm machine gun (version-specific)
- Engine: Militarized Renault Trucks 6-cylinder turbodiesel engine 400 hp (300 kW)
- Transmission: ZF seven-speed automatic gearbox
- Suspension: Six-wheel drive
- Operational range: 800 km (500 mi)
- Maximum speed: 90 km/h (56 mph)

The Véhicule Blindé Multi-Rôle Griffon ( English: Multirole Armoured Vehicle Griffon) or VBMR Griffon is a French six-wheel multi-purpose armoured personnel carrier developed and manufactured by KNDS France (formerly Nexter Systems), Arquus (formerly Renault Trucks Defense) and Thales. The vehicle entered service in 2019 and is, alongside the four-wheel VBMR-L Serval co-developed by KNDS France and Texelis, the successor of the Véhicule de l'Avant Blindé (VAB).

Components of the French SCORPION programme, the two vehicles are expected to fulfill a wide range of tasks and thus consist of several variants and subvariants. An on-board 120 mm mortar system based on the Griffon, designated Griffon MEPAC, has notably been developed. Furthermore, two distinct Serval-based air defence platforms are under development as of 2023; the Serval LAD, intended as a dedicated counter-UAV vehicle, and the Serval Mistral (or Serval TCP) for general V/SHORAD applications.

In total, 1,818 VBMR Griffon, 2,038 VBMR-L Serval, 54 Griffon MEPAC as well as at least 85 Serval LAD and Serval Mistral/TCP are to be delivered to the French Army by 2035.

== Background ==
Since the 2000s, the French Army had been looking to replace the emblematic VAB, which entered service in 1979. The vehicle was becoming increasingly obsolete in the face of new and upcoming conflicts. After multiple postponements of a programme to modernize the French Army's Armoured Cavalry Arm, the 2013 White Paper on Defense and National Security recommended the order of 2080 multi-role armoured vehicles (1,958 heavy VBMR and 122 lightweight VBMR) as well as 248 armoured reconnaissance and combat vehicles (EBRC). In 2014, the French Ministry of Defense finally entrusted their design to a consortium formed by Nexter, Arquus and Thales, who had announced their intention to collaborate as early as 2010 and had initiated preliminary work for a joint technical solution.

The development and purchase of this new generation of armoured vehicles, part of a programme styled SCORPION (Synergie du COntact Renforcée par la Polyvalence et l'InfovalorisatiON; English: Contact Synergy Reinforced by Versatility and Infotainment), was officially announced on 5 December 2014. The long-awaited first stage of the programme had been launched in October that year. This first stage, for a total cost of nearly €5.1 billion (FY2017), includes the replacement of the VAB by the VBMR Griffon, the replacement of the AMX-10 RC, ERC-90 Sagaie and VAB HOT by the EBRC Jaguar, the modernization of the Leclerc tank as well as the development of a unified combat information network to ensure the coherence of systems in service. Under this initial €5 billion investment plan up to 2025, 780 VBMR and 110 EBRC were to be acquired. The content of the following stages of the programme was to be consolidated at a later date to achieve the target set by the 2014-2019 Military Programming Law (LPM) and updated by the Defence Council's amendments on April 6, 2016: 1,722 heavy VBMR Griffon, 522 lightweight VBMR (which was to become the VBMR-L Serval), 248 EBRC Jaguar and 200 renovated Leclerc XLR. The first 319 Griffon and 20 Jaguar were ordered in April 2017.

In the 2019-2025 LPM adopted in July 2018, the SCORPION programme's targets were revised upwards with the planned acquisition of a total of 1,872 VBMR Griffon, 978 VMBR-L Serval, 300 EBRC Jaguar as well as the upgrade of 200 Leclerc tanks and 18 DCL armoured recovery vehicles to the XLR standard; all to be delivered by 2030. The total cost of the programme was estimated at €11 billion.

On 26 October 2018, the Belgian government formalized the plan to purchase 60 EBRC Jaguar and 382 VBMR Griffon for €1.5 billion. The vehicles will replace the Belgian Army's Piranha IIIC armoured personnel carriers and Dingo 2 infantry mobility vehicles. The deal includes spare parts and secure communications equipment and deliveries are scheduled to start in 2025.

== VBMR platform ==
=== Design ===
When the first stage of the programme was launched in 2014, the aim was to achieve an acquisition cost of €1 million per VBMR and €3 million per EBRC. This was expected to be achieved in part through the large quantities of SCORPION vehicles to be acquired, enabling economies of scale. Furthermore, the consortium opted for the Griffon to share 70% of its components with the Jaguar to save on development, production and maintenance costs as well as to facilitate logistics. Constituents shared include the suspension, supplied by Strasbourg-based company Quiri, the Elips intercom system by Argenteuil-based Elno, the roof-mounted PILAR V acoustic gunfire detection and localization system by Lyon-based Metravib Defence, as well as the vetronics. Featuring a wide range of state-of-the-art technologies, the Jaguar ultimately ended up costing twice as much as expected with an estimated unit cost of €6 million (FY2019), but the Griffon nonetheless benefited from the common development with an average cost estimated at just €1.5 million per unit (FY2017), 50% more than its original target price.

Derived from the BMX 01 prototype proposed by Renault Trucks Defense, the Griffon benefits from a classic layout. It's a huge armoured truck with six-wheel drive and four-wheel steering (front and rear axles), with the powertrain at the front. The vehicle weighs in at around 25 tonnes in combat order, roughly twice as much as the 13-tonne VAB. The embarked combat group of a standard Griffon (the VTT Félin) comprises 10 fully-equipped soldiers; a driver, a dedicated gunner as well as 8 infantrymen, including the commander. In the crew cabin, the driver (front left) and the remote turret gunner (front right) are sheltered by a one-piece armoured windshield. They access their seats through side doors fitted with armoured windows. The rear part of the body is taken up by the compartment, with two small armoured windows on each side, where 8 men sit facing each other on anti-blast seats fixed to the side walls. A ramp at the back, featuring an emergency door and an episcope, that comes down low enough for the troops to skip on and off enables entry and exit. The rear compartment is surmounted by four roof hatches: one at the front left, behind the driver; one above the gunner's station, behind the remotely-operated turret; and two at the rear. The Griffon features a militarized variant of a commercial Renault-Volvo diesel powertrain rated at 400 hp, an automatic gearbox and independent running gears, enabling the vehicle to reach a top speed of 90 km/h and a range of up to 800 km. The engine is rail-mounted, facilitating maintenance operations. It is able to run on various types of fuel to facilitate replenishment wherever in the world French forces would be deployed. The Griffon also incorporates air conditioning and heating for comfort, as well as an overpressure protection system in order to keep the crew and passengers safe from chemical, biological, radiological and nuclear (CBRN) threats. Crossing capacities are of the order of 1.2 m for a ford, 50 cm for a step and 1 m for a ditch.

The Griffon is designed to offer STANAG 4569 Level 4 armour protection as standard, being capable of withstanding 14.5 mm armour-piercing ammunition, 155 mm artillery shell splinters, IEDs and mine blasts, thus significantly improving the safety of the soldiers engaged over the VAB. Furthermore, armour protection levels can be raised beyond STANAG Level 4 through the installation of a modular armour package. A deployed French Griffon GTIA (in the French Army, a GTIA is a combined arms battle group composed of a little over 1,000 men) would be composed of two or three infantry companies equipped with Griffon vehicles, and a Jaguar cavalry squadron. Although its structure would be modular according to the missions assigned to it, each conventional infantry company is expected to have at its disposal: a command section comprising a command Griffon (Griffon EPC), a mobile maintenance workshop one (Griffon ELI) and 2 medical evacuation ones (Griffon SAN); three infantry sections with 4 Griffon each (Griffon VTT Félin); a combat engineering section with 3 Griffon (Griffon GEN); a fire support section with 2 Griffon equipped with 81 mm mortars (Griffon MO81), another with 2 Griffon equipped with Akeron MP missiles (Griffon MMP) and a last one with a Griffon embarking a sniper section (Griffon STE). In addition, there is an artillery observation Griffon (Griffon VOA) as well as several trucks and light all-terrain vehicles.

The Direction Générale de l'Armement (DGA), the French defense procurement agency, announced the Griffon's qualification on June 24, 2019, enabling the first vehicles to be delivered on July 4, 2019. By the end of 2021, 339 units of the VMBR Griffon had been delivered to the French Army. The first operational units were displayed on the Champs-Élysées during the 2019 Bastille Day Parade. By 2025, the SCORPION infantry should have achieved its first infovalorization and collaborative combat capability, with the Griffon multi-role armoured vehicles having begun to replace the quadragenarian VAB in 2019 and half of the Griffon ordered expected to have been delivered. In the 2024-2030 Military Programming Law, it is stated 1,437 VBMR Griffon are to enter French service by 2030 and 1,818 by 2035. 54 Griffon MEPAC are also expected to be delivered to the French Army by 2030.

=== Sensors and situational awareness ===
The data collected by the sensors equipping the Griffon are fed into the SCORPION bubble via a common combat information network, which is the SICS (Système d'Information du Combat de SCORPION; English: SCORPION Combat Information System), developed by Atos-Bull, and the CONTACT (COmmunications Numériques TACtiques et de Théâtre; English: Tactical and theater digital communications) software defined radio system developed by Thales. The SICS interconnects all the players in a combined arms battle group, while the CONTACT provides communication capabilities between the vehicles, with simultaneous and real time voice and data transmission. The Griffon is characterized by its vetronics i.e. the architecture of its on-board electronic systems. Also developed by Thales, the architecture is common to all SCORPION vehicles. It requires compact yet powerful computers and links all navigation, protection, observation and communication systems. It manages and merges all data within the vehicle. The SCORPION Common Vetronics ensure the processing and exchange of intra- and inter-vehicle data, enabling collaborative combat. In addition, vetronics play a decisive role in vehicle protection, thanks in particular to algorithms that offer the vehicle commander and his men several options for dealing with a threat, allowing them to opt for the one they deem the most adequate for the situation. Meanwhile, Safran's Epsilon 10 inertial navigation system provides precise position, autonomous engagement and navigation capabilities to the vehicle, including in GNSS-denied environments.

The Griffon's countermeasures include a laser alert detector, a missile launch detector, a gunshot detection system, an infrared jammer and an anti-IED jammer. It will integrate both the Eclipse smart software defined jammer from Thales, which provides electronic protection against IED/RCIED threats as well as the company's Antares optronics system. The Eclipse instantly detects and responds to the triggering of improvised explosive devices by jamming radio remote control signals across a wide range of frequencies without interfering with the radio communication systems used by friendly forces. The Antares combines precise laser warning and local situational awareness capabilities in a single electro-optical head. The module can be mounted on either the vehicle's roof or turret and provides a 360° azimuthal field of view around the vehicle, day and night, and elevation coverage from -15° to +75°, which also makes it possible to spot snipers on rooftops. With a resolution of 5 million pixels, it provides colour video for daytime operations and black-and-white video for night-time operations. In daylight, the system can see an armoured vehicle at a distance of 500 m or a small drone at a distance of 250 m, and detect a human being up to 150 m away. Thanks to its built-in laser warning system, the Antares also issues an alert if the vehicle is targeted by a laser rangefinder or designator. It can locate laser threats to within 1.5 degrees as well as detect the launch of an incoming missile, allowing the crew to react as it sees fit. Additionally, the vehicle features the Pilar V, a roof-mounted device capable of detecting, identifying and locating shots from small arms, medium-calibre weapons, mortar shells, shaped charge rockets or RPGs in real time. It provides a 360° coverage and is always active. It can filter outgoing fire to avoid false detections and false reports to the SICS combat information system, and can detect whether single or burst shots are being fired in the vehicle's direction. The Pilar V is accurate to within 2° in azimuth and 3° in elevation, with a 10% margin for distance estimation. However, if other Griffon or SCORPION vehicles are in the vicinity, their own PILAR V systems will detect the shot as well and can exchange the data instantly. The vetronics will then triangulate to pinpoint the shooter's position and share the information across all vehicles. The vetronics will also be able to automatically direct the remotely-operated turret towards this position, and propose firing among other options. This threat discrimination and precise target designation capability improves situational awareness, immediate reaction and the effectiveness of retaliatory fire.

Countermeasures yet to equip the Griffon include an active protection system; one is being developed by Thales and Nexter for integration on SCORPION vehicles under the PROMETEUS (PROtection Multi Effets Terrestre Unifiée; English: Unified terrestrial multi-effect protection) programme, which aims to develop a global armour protection system for SCORPION vehicles combining three technologies: "versatile passive protection", "reactive protection" and "active protection". The latter, designated Diamant, is a distributed hard-kill active protection system being developed by Thales comprising four frequency-modulated continuous-wave radar sensors mounted on the corners of the vehicle, a number of effector modules mounted around the perimeter of the vehicle, on its roof and around its hood, and a power supply system for the control unit computer. The system uses the radars to detect and track potential threats such as anti-tank rockets and anti-tank guided missiles. Once the threat has been detected, the system instructs the appropriate effector module to launch a countermeasure along the threat's trajectory, in order to destroy or degrade it sufficiently so that it can no longer perforate the vehicle's passive armor.

The Griffon is designed to simplify maintenance. The vehicles are fitted with sensors on key components, such as suspension, brake pads and gearboxes, enabling predictive maintenance. The principle is to deploy Health and Usage Monitoring Systems (HUMS) on these key functions to generate continuous data on vehicle activity. This data is stored and analyzed to determine remaining potential, anticipate breakdowns and program interventions at the right moment. This method, one of several being explored as part of the MCO-T 2025 plan, is intended to help streamline support operations and improve vehicle availability. HUMS sensors can, for example, take the form of a dynamic engine oil quality control system. This control tool will allow oil changes to be carried out when necessary, rather than systematically after a set number of kilometers. The adoption of predictive maintenance, agreed in a rider to the SCORPION contract, meant developing the software layer needed to coordinate sensors and analyze data. SCORPION vehicles are the first in the French military designed to be equipped with HUMS sensors; adding this capability is therefore not a complex operation. It boils down to connecting a few cables to a central box located behind the vehicle's driver. The maneuver is also closely linked to the SERUM (Système d'Entretien et de Réparation Unique du Maintenancier; English: Maintainer's Unique Maintenance and Repair System) cases developed by Arquus. This diagnostic tool takes the form of a computer which can be plugged into the vehicle to perform maintenance operations or identify faults.

=== Armament ===
The VBMR Griffon, in its standard VTT Félin configuration, is equipped with a gyro-stabilized T1 Hornet remote controlled weapon station provided by Arquus. It is armed with either a 12.7 mm or 7.62 mm machine gun, or a 40 mm automatic grenade launcher. The ammunition box is mounted on the left side of the turret and holds 300 rounds of 12.7 mm ammunition, or 1,000 rounds of 7.62 mm ammunition, or 64 40 mm grenades. The lower part of the turret, meanwhile, incorporates an independent GALIX countermeasure system developed and manufactured by Lacroix Defense and Nexter, which consists of 8 80 mm smoke grenade dischargers linked to the ANTARES laser warning system. It operates alongside the missile launch detector, the PILAR V, the ECLIPSE and the infrared jammer. The GALIX is a self-protection system that makes vehicle protection more reliable through an automatic detection action, which drastically reduces protection engagement time by automating the decision phase. When a shot is detected within a 5 km radius, the sensors transfer threat and angle-of-attack data to the vehicle's fire-control system. In response, the GALIX will launch multispectral countermeasures in less than a second, capable of disrupting the opposing gunner. Essentially, the grenades deploy a cloud of smoke that mask the vehicle in visible range as well as all laser wavebands (target designators, laser rangefinders, etc.) and large infrared bands (0.8-14 microns) covering bands I, III and IV. This non-toxic protective cloud lasts up to 90 seconds and is created from ground level up to a maximum height of 7 meters and to a distance of between 20 and 60 meters from the vehicle. Furthermore, the system is designed not only for self-defense (passive action), but is also capable of neutralizing hostile personnel (as it can fire a variety of lethal and non-lethal charges). The Hornet is electrically powered and has a 360° rotation, with elevation from -20° to +60°. The turret is controlled from inside the vehicle using a joystick associated to a dedicated 13’3 16/9 full HD touch screen. The day and night sighting and fire-control system it integrates (the MINEO from Safran, mounted to the right side of the main armament) grants the vehicle commander and gunner a wider field of vision for target detection, recognition and identification. The MINEO combines an uncooled thermal imager, a laser rangefinder and three fixed daylight cameras with fields of view of 40°, 10° and 3°. Close to the human eye, the first is used to scan wide and provide an overall understanding of the situation. If something or someone catches his eye, the shooter can switch to the medium field and then concentrate on identifying the threat with the smaller field. The same goes for the thermal camera, this time with 14° and 7° fields. The rangefinder, meanwhile, provides the ability to mark a target.

With variants and subvariants incorporating equipment and/or systems specific to them, Griffon-derived fire support vehicles possess their own main armament, ranging from Akeron MP missiles to the MEPAC on-board 120 mm mortar system. They nonetheless also integrate a remotely-operated turret as secondary armament (typically the T2 Hornet Lite equipped with a 7.62 mm machine gun as well as the GALIX, and featuring the same MINEO sighting system as the T1 Hornet).

Each SCORPION vehicle's remote controlled weapon station is a contributor to the intelligence acquisition and sharing chain. As common SCORPION equipment, they are the "eyes" of collaborative combat. Each remotely-operated turret is integrated into the vehicle's vetronics, which in turn is linked to the other elements of a French company team or GTIA via the SICS combat information system. This facilitates the sharing of tactical information in real time, allowing every section to have a precise idea of the situation of friendly vehicles and enabling SCORPION Vehicle A (whether a Griffon, Serval, Jaguar or Leclerc XLR) to engage a target identified by SCORPION Vehicle B.

== Variants of the Griffon and their design ==
To rationalise development, production and maintenance costs, the French army has opted for a semi-modular platform. The front part of the vehicle, from the engine compartment to the intermediate bulkhead, will be identical for the entire fleet. Only the rear half, from the second axle upwards, will be modular. It will therefore be possible, for example, to alter a Griffon MMP subvariant into a Griffon VTT Félin one simply by replacing the missile supports in the rear section of the cabin with seats. This novel configuration will enable the French Army to efficiently replace the 30 or so variants of the VAB. The Griffon will be available in six main variants: VTT (all-terrain troop transport vehicle), EPC (command post vehicle), VOA (artillery observation vehicle), SAN (medical evacuation vehicle), MEPAC (on-board 120 mm mortar for contact support) and NRBC (CBRN defense vehicle). Apart from these variants, there are many levels of adaptability for the Griffon. In addition to the common base, this central attribute of modularity extends to turret and protection kits. Not all vehicles are equipped with these kits from the outset, as they are installed according to mission requirements.

The list below summarises the variants designed for the French Army, not all will be operated by Belgium and Luxembourg.

- VTT: Armoured personnel carrier
  - Félin: Infantry carrier
  - MMP: Medium-range missile platform
  - STE: Sniper section carrier
  - MO81: 81 mm dismounted mortar
  - GEN: Combat engineering
  - ELI: Mobile maintenance workshop platform
  - RAV: Refuelling
- EPC: Command post vehicle
- VOA: Artillery observation vehicle
- SAN: Medical evacuation vehicle
- NRBC: CBRN defense vehicle
- MEPAC: Mortar carrier

=== Design of the variants ===
==== Griffon VTT ====
The Griffon VTT represents the principal variant of the VBMR Griffon, with over 1,000 vehicles to be delivered. Its first and most common configuration, the Félin (infantry carrier), was qualified for service on 24 June 2019. The Griffon VTT will consist of seven subvariants: Félin, STE (sniper section carrier), MMP (medium-range missile platform), MO81 (dismounted 81 mm mortar vehicle), GEN (combat engineering vehicle), ELI (light intervention element vehicle; the principle is that of a mobile maintenance workshop) and RAV (refuelling vehicle).

==== Griffon EPC ====
The Griffon EPC is effectively indistinguishable from the standard VTT Félin from the outside. The reasoning behind this is simple: to prevent an ordinary adversary from identifying the variant, and therefore from focusing on high-value targets. Differences include the protrusion created by the addition of the mast and the roof-mounted T2 Hornet Lite remote controlled weapon station incorporating a 7.62 mm machine gun and the GALIX, instead of the standard T1 model. On the other hand, the rear compartment has been redesigned to make room for a command post. Carrying 7 soldiers (1 pilot and 1 gunner at the front and 5 at the rear manning the command post), it has been designed to accommodate communications equipment, large screens, a blackboard, a printer and everything else needed for collaborative combat (vetronics, CONTACT software-defined radio, SCORPION combat information system, ANTARES optronics system, fire start detector, etc.). The air-conditioning has also been reinforced to protect the on-board electronics in extreme climatic conditions. The Griffon EPC was qualified for service by the DGA in November 2020. 333 units are to be delivered to the French Army.

==== Griffon SAN ====
As for the Griffon Sanitaire, abbreviated Griffon SAN, it will be used for casualty care and evacuation. This variant was qualified for service by the DGA on 12 September 2022. It is equipped with a medical module, facilities for storing and integrating medical equipment, and a casualty loading system comprising a mobile table and a lifting winch. The interior configuration can accommodate seated or lying patients, with a capacity of four stretchers. The SAN features all the elements common to other Griffon variants (mobility, armament, protection and connectivity). 196 units in total are to be delivered to the French Armed Forces Health Service and will be complemented by 135 Serval SAN and 103 VLTP-NP SAN vehicles.

==== Griffon VOA ====
The Griffon VOA (artillery observation vehicle) was qualified for service in June 2023. It features Safran's new generation PASEO Crystal high-resolution sensors suite installed on top of a telescopic mast, which integrates an inertial navigation system (derived from the company's Sigma 20 family) based on hemispherical resonator gyroscope technology. The PASEO Crystal incorporates five systems: a laser rangefinder, a laser pointer, a laser designator, a TV day channel and a thermal camera providing the night channel (with their images able to be combined in low light conditions, especially during short winter days, at dawn or dusk). The optronic observation mast provides surveillance, artillery observation and designation, fire control and geolocation information, including for airstrikes with a JTAC (Joint Terminal Attack Controller). The Griffon VOA is also equipped with the MURIN (Moyen de surveillance Utilisant un Radar d’observation des INtervalles; English: Interval Radar Surveillance System) ground observation radar developed by Thales, which can be deployed outside the vehicle. This variant of the Griffon will be able to spot, identify and monitor virtually anything that moves, rolls or flies within a 24 km radius and at an altitude of 500 m (from vehicles to the movements of an individual burying an IED or mine for example, and from shell bursts to helicopters up to 500 m above sea level). 177 Griffon VOA are to be delivered to the French Army in total.

==== Griffon MEPAC ====
The MEPAC system is to be integrated on a dedicated variant of the Griffon, designated Griffon MEPAC. An evolution of the Thales 2R2M 120 mm semi-automatic mortar system, it can fire up to ten rounds per minute against targets up to 13 km away with improved accuracy; the vehicle can then set itself in motion while closing the roof hatches at the same time. As for shells, two new developments are expected; the MURAT 120 mm reduced-risk ammunition, offering a 12% increase in maximum range with no loss of effectiveness, and a metric-precision ammunition with a 15 km range. As it can be put into road position as quickly as into battery, it is designed to avoid counter-battery fire more easily, while providing better protection for the crew. The Griffon MEPAC, like the Griffon EPC, is virtually indistinguishable from the Griffon VTT Félin from the outside. Whereas the latter is designed to carry 10 fully-equipped soldiers, the MEPAC will accommodate a reduced crew of four artillerymen, namely the pilot, the gun leader and two soldiers operating the MEPAC. The chief will switch from the front of the vehicle during the driving phase, to a position at the rear to command the battery and firing. Reducing the crew from five as originally intended to four has also freed up considerable space for additional ammunition. The turntable-mounted mortar can be rotated through 360° and has a hydraulic-powered elevation range of 40° to 85°. The Griffon MEPAC will be equipped with a computerized fire-control system, automatic laying system and inertial navigation system from Thales as well as a T2 Hornet Lite remotely-operated turret armed with a 7.62 mm machine gun and fitted with the GALIX. It will also be integrated into the ATLAS (Automatisation des Tirs et Liaisons de l’Artillerie Sol/sol; English: Automated firing and ground-to-ground artillery links) artillery system, while retaining the option of firing in degraded mode (tube movement by manual pump, orientation by goniometer, manual loading from roof hatches and firing under manual control). 54 units are to be delivered to the French Army from the fourth quarter of 2023 to 2027, with a prototype scheduled for delivery as soon as 2020, and qualification testing expected to take place between 2022 and 2023.

==== Griffon NRBC ====
The Griffon NRBC is still under study as of 2021. Its development is deemed complex as the aim is a full-fledged weapon system dedicated to CBRN countermeasures. It is therefore not scheduled for delivery before 2025. The vehicles will equip the 2nd Dragoon Regiment. 25 units are expected to be delivered.

== Operators ==
=== Current operators ===
France (1,872 planned, 723 delivered)
The detailed orders isn't public, but we know that 54 of the MEPAC variant have been ordered.
Orders:
- Tranche 1, 2017, 319 Griffon ordered
- Tranche 2, 2020, 271 Griffon ordered
- Tranche 3, 2022, 54 MEPAC ordered
- Tranche 4, 2022, 302 Griffon ordered
Deliveries:
- 2019, 92 delivered
- 2020, 128 delivered, making a total of 220 delivered to the French Army
- 2021: 119 delivered, making a total of 339 delivered to the French Army
- 2022: 113 delivered, making a total of 452 delivered to the French Army
- 2023: 123 delivered, making a total of 575 delivered to the French Army
Variants delivered as of October 2023:
- 443 VTT
- 79 EPC
- 11 VOA
Planned deliveries:
- 2024: 138 planned, among which 8 MEPAC, but only one MEPAC delivered, the total of the other variants isn't known yet.
- By 2025: a total of 887 are planned to be delivered.
- By 2030, a total of 1,437 are planned to be delivered (550 from 2026 to 2030)
- By 2035, a total of 1,872 are planned to be delivered (435 from 2031 to 2035)
Belgium (498)
Orders:
- 382 Griffon ordered in October 2018 as part of the CaMo programme, to enter service from 2026 to 2031.
- 24 Griffon MEPAC decided in June 2022, and signed in December 2023.
- 92 Griffon: purchase order approved by Belgian parliament in December 2025.
Deliveries
- Planned for 2025 - 2030, and to enter service in 2026.
The variants ordered by the Belgian Army:
- 35 Griffon SAN

=== Future operators ===
Luxembourg (16)
The Luxembourg parliament approved the purchase in November 2024.
The contract was signed in December 2025. It includes:
- 4 command vehicles for the headquarters (état-major)
- 4 command vehicles (2 per multinational squadron)
- 2 JTAC (artillery observer)
- 1 for sharpshooters
- 5 for maintenance and supply roles

=== Potential operators ===
Cyprus

The Cyprus National Guard is reportedly considering the purchase of 80 Griffon along with 100 Serval vehicles.
