= GMM-120 self-propelled mortar =

GMM-120
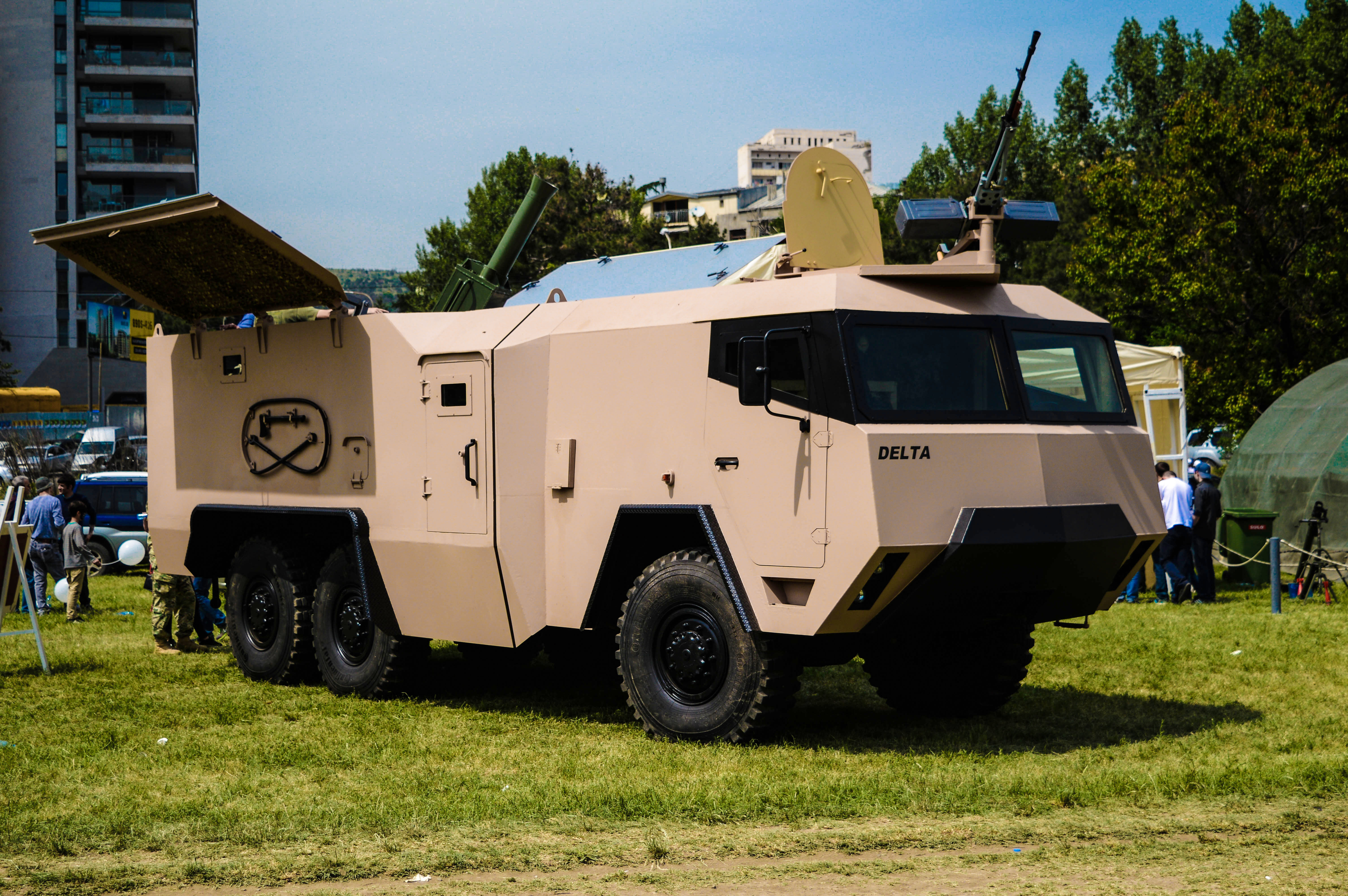
- Type: Mortar carrier
- Place of origin: Georgia

Production history
- Designer: Scientific Technical Center Delta
- Manufacturer: STC Delta
- No. built: 1

Specifications
- Length: 8.4 m
- Width: 2.8 m
- Height: 2.8 m
- Crew: 6 (5)
- Caliber: 120 mm
- Barrels: single barrel
- Rate of fire: 15 rounds/m
- Effective firing range: 480 m (minimal)
- Maximum firing range: 7.1 km
- Armor: STANAG 4569 level 2
- Main armament: 120 mm mortar RWS
- Secondary armament: NSV 12.7×108 mm MG
- Suspension: 6×6 wheeled

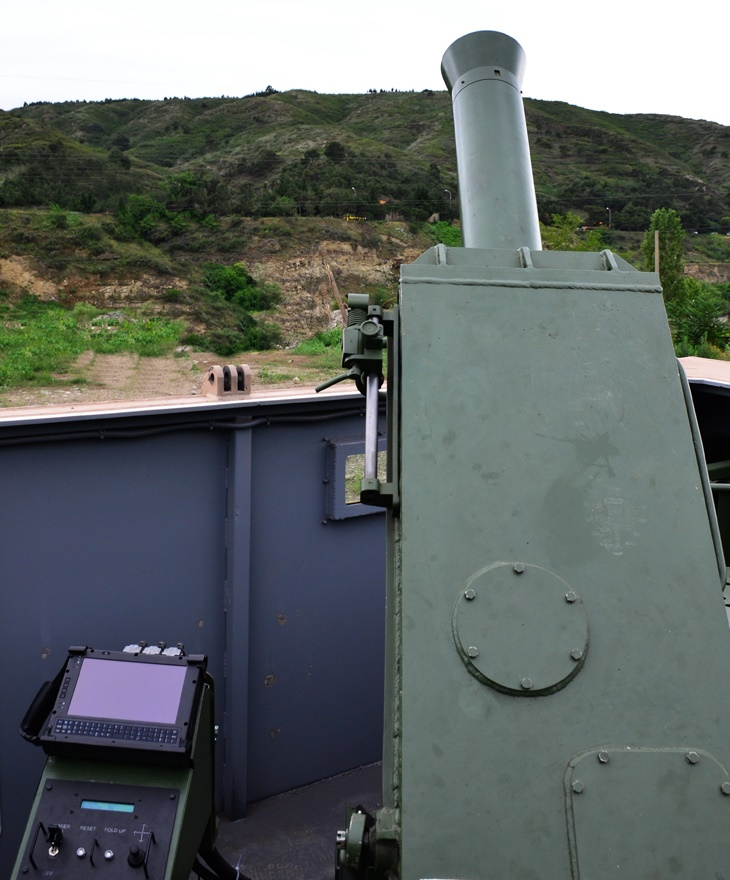
The vehicle's mortar section

The GMM-120 self-propelled mortar (Georgian: თვითმავალი ნაღმტყორცნი გმმ-120) is a proposed armoured mortar carrier concept with a 120 mm automated mortar station. The system is being developed by STC Delta.

== Design and technical characteristics ==
The carrier vehicle is constructed around the chassis of 6x6 MAN KAT1 transport vehicles primarily used for military purposes. It consists of two main components and three independent sections with the crew cabin located in the center offering space for four passengers or artillery crew and a large back portion encasing the automated artillery station. The weapon is stored and remains concealed inside the carrier until the large roof hatches open in preparation for fire missions.

=== Protection ===
The vehicle is fitted with several layers of armour that provide overall protection in accordance to STANAG 4569 level 2 similar to the Didgori APCs.

=== Armament ===
The primary weapon GMM-120 is an automated weapon station equipped with a digital fire control- and navigation panel with GPS. It is further supported with a state of the art communication system. The rate of fire is 15 rounds per minute with ranges of 480 m to 7,100 m. The vehicle can carry a total of 60 and different type mortar ammunition with the module itself carrying 10 rounds while two separate containers carry 25 rounds each. The weapon has a 360 degree traverse and almost 90 degree elevation angle. During transport the weapon remains concealed and won't be operated. However it takes less than a minute to have the weapon system ready to fire or relocate.

For self-protection, the carrier is armed with a NSV heavy machine gun mounted on top of the driver cabin. This however provides the gunner only a limited traverse angle so that the vehicle ideally has to face the threat.

== See also ==
- Mortar
- Mortar carrier
- Remote weapon station
