= 2S41 Drok =

Russian 82 mm self-propelled mortar

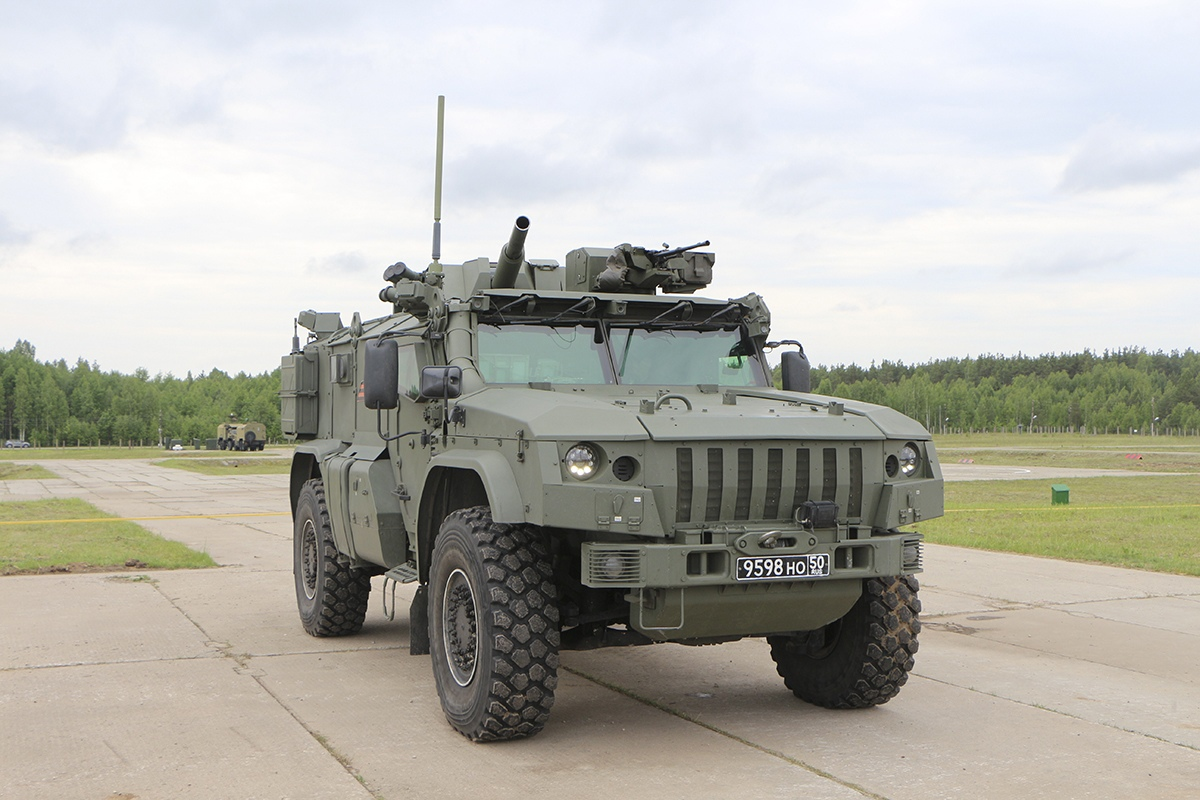
- 2S41 Drok self-propelled mortar
- Type: Self-propelled mortar
- Place of origin: Russia

Service history
- In service: 2023–present

Production history
- Designer: Burevestnik Central Scientific Research Institute

Specifications
- Mass: 14.5 t (14.3 long tons; 16.0 short tons)
- Crew: 4
- Caliber: 82 mm (3.2 in)
- Elevation: +45 to +85
- Traverse: ±35
- Rate of fire: 12 rounds per minute
- Maximum firing range: 6 km (3.7 mi)
- Engine: Kamaz-650.10-350; 260 kW (350 hp)
- Maximum speed: 100 km/h (62 mph)

2S41 "Drok" (Russian: 2С41 «Дрок»; "Broom") is a Russian self-propelled 82 mm mortar system created on the basis of the 4x4 Typhoon armored car, being developed by Burevestnik Research Institute for the Russian Airborne Forces. Drok was designed as part of "Nabrosok" program.

== Development ==
A scale model of Drok was presented at ARMY-2017 forum. In 2018 it was reported that vehicle would undergo trials in 2019. It was officially presented at ARMY-2019 forum. During ARMY-2021 forum it was announced that the first batch of mortars would be delivered for trial use by troops in 2022.

At the beginning of July 2023, the Rostec corporation began transferring the first batch of 82-mm 2S41 self-propelled mortars to the troops of the Russian Federation to equip artillery batteries.

== Description ==
The "Drok" uses an 82mm mortar mounted on a Kamaz-4386 4x4 wheeled chassis, also called the "Typhoon VDV", which is an MRAP-type vehicle with a V-hull in a 4x4 configuration. It was designed to increase the fire power of the airborne assault units. The car is equipped with a Kamaz-650.10-350 engine with a power of 260 kW (350 hp), which allows it to reach speeds on the highway of up to 100 km/h (62 mph).

The mortar is inside of a turret mounted on the roof of the vehicle, and 40 shells can be carried directly inside of the vehicle. The effective range is from 100–6,000 m (110–6,560 yd). The rate of fire is about 12 rounds per minute. For self-defense purposes, a separate remote-controlled turret is mounted above the driver's seat, equipped with a 7.62 mm machine gun. There are smoke launchers for self-defense and countering laser-guided weapons; The 2S41 also has a warning system for laser targeting of the vehicle.

== Operators ==
- Russia: From July 2023, the vehicle officially entered into service with the Russian Armed Forces.
