= 2R2M mortar =

2R2M
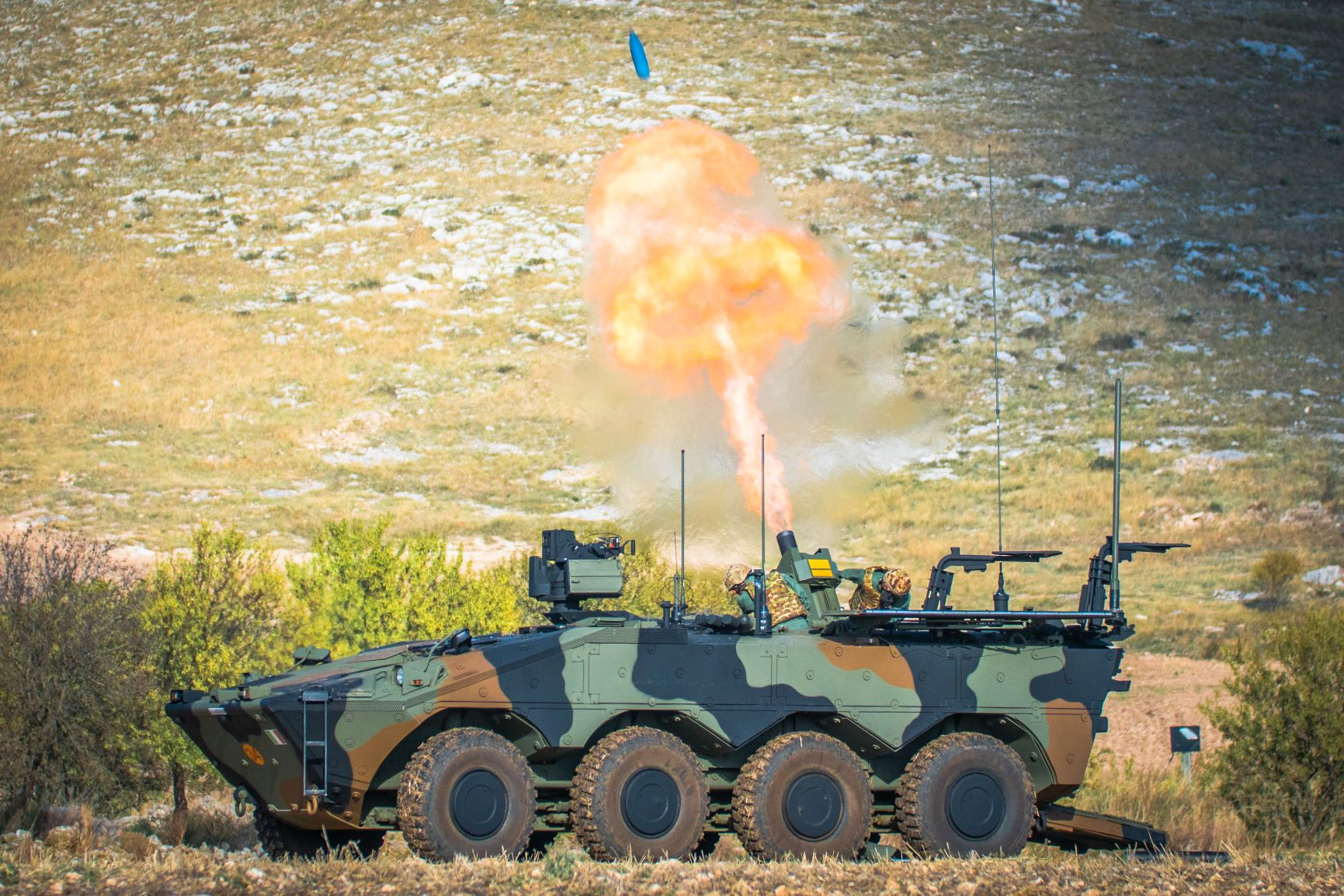
- The 2R2M mortar in Italian service (on Freccia IFV).
- Type: Heavy Mortar
- Place of origin: France

Specifications
- Shell: 16–18.7 kg (35–41 lb)
- Caliber: 120 mm
- Rate of fire: 10 rounds per minute (maximum); 4 rounds per minute (sustained)
- Effective firing range: 8,140 m (8,900 yd) with standard projectile 12,850 m (14,050 yd) with rocket-assisted projectile
- Maximum firing range: 17 km (19,000 yd) with Precision Extended Range Munition (PERM)

The 2R2M (Rifled Recoiled Mounted Mortar) is a vehicle-mounted, rifled 120 mm heavy mortar produced by Thales of France. It is derived from the MO-120-RT towed mortar. The 2R2M is in service with 5 nations.

The US Marine Corps field-tested a mortar system derived from the 2R2M in the early 2000's under the project names Dragon Fire and Dragon Fire II. More than just an adaptation of the 2R2M system to the USMC's LAV-25 chassis, this project aimed for the added option to lift the entire weapon assembly, including the semi-automated loading mechanism and the computerised fire control system, out of the carrier vehicle and put it on a carriage to be towed by a tractor vehicle such as a HMMWV. The USMC eventually dropped the Dragon Fire II project and instead opted for the baseline MO-120-RT mortar, which it called the M327 mortar, towed by a M1161 Growler, for their EFSS (Expeditionary Fire Support System).

In December 2019, the MEPAC (Mortier Embarqué Pour l'Appui au Contact), an evolution of the 2R2M was selected by France and will equip a dedicated self-propelled mortar variant of the VBMR Griffon.

== History (Dragon Fire II) ==
The US Marine Corps Warfighting Laboratory (MCWL) started a Concept Demonstrator project in 1997. They wanted a "mortar in a box," that is a weapon that could be remotely emplaced and fired unattended on a future battlefield. In late 1997, MCWL accepted a proposal by the army's Program Manager, Mortars (PM Mortars) and Armament Research, Development, and Engineering Command (ARDEC) at Picatinny Arsenal, New Jersey to design and build a firing system to fulfill the design objectives. An early requirement was that the system had to be a 120 mm system to give sufficient lethality and range. Ultimately, the design team picked parts of the French Thomson-Daimler Armements (TDA) experimental 2R2M mortar because it had a usable power driven traverse and elevation in addition to a loading system. Its 120 mm rifled ammunition promised greater accuracy and range.

The project completed the experimental weapon, now called the Dragon Fire, in 17 months. It was used in a series of firing experiments beginning in September 1998. During 1999–2002, the Dragon Fire was used during the Limited Object Experiment (LOE) Urban Warrior and several follow-on experiments, and the French-made 2R2M mortar mounted in a MOWAG Piranha vehicle served as a surrogate for a mobile, Light Armored Vehicle-mounted firing system. These experiments showed that the concept of automating the fire control, aiming and loading of a medium-range firing system substantially reduced fire mission response times and resulted in accurate, efficient fire.

Following successful testing, the Marine Corps initiated a Requirement Document for an Expeditionary Fire Support System (EFSS) to fill the gap in the availability of supporting fire for the initial air-delivered elements of an expeditionary operation. The Marine Corps Warfighting Lab initiated a follow-on project called Dragon Fire II, which was to be a government-designed, government-produced weapons system and it would incorporate the "lessons learned" with the first Dragon Fire. PM Mortars/ARDEC was again designated to do the design work and to modify the M95 Mortar Fire Control System (MFCS) to provide the advanced fire control and weapon control for the new system.

The project was initiated in 2002, but, not long afterwards, TDA dropped out of the project because of issues concerning sharing of design information and their price, and when Marine Corps Systems Command made it known that it would be looking for an "off the shelf, commercial system" for the EFSS requirement, the system specifications for the Dragon Fire II were de-scoped to Concept Demonstrator and the budget was reduced. ARDEC contracted with General Dynamics to design the new electric actuators for elevation, traverse, loading and firing and despite some difficulties in that contract, the finished Dragon Fire II, now known as the XM-326 120mm Automated Mortar, was rolled out at Rock Island Arsenal in September 2005.

The new Dragon Fire II was half the weight of the first Dragon Fire, 1,565 kg (3,450 lb) versus over 3,175 kg (7,000 lb). It was capable of receiving a fire mission over its on-board radio, processing the fire mission, aiming the weapon, loading and firing in any direction within 18 seconds. The Dragon Fire II was incorporated into testing with the Counter Rockets, Artillery, and Mortars (C-RAM) project while it was still undergoing engineering and safety tests at Yuma Proving Ground. It fired in support of C-RAM's demonstrations and was responsive and accurate, with most rounds landing within a circular error probable (CEP) of 15 m (49 ft) at a range of 5,600 m (18,400 ft).

During 2007, a Light Armored Vehicle was modified to accept the Dragon Fire internally as a modular artillery weapon. Over the next months opposition to the Dragon Fire II and to MCWL's involvement in long-term experimentation increased. Funding was first reduced and then cut completely. As a last attempt to use this system, it was converted to become a full-time LAV mortar system for the Marine Corps. This funding was removed in 2009 and the weapon is currently in storage at Picatinny Arsenal. It was proposed to develop a "fire on the move" capability for the Dragon Fire II - Light Armored Vehicle (LAV-M) as the first artillery system to fire accurately from the moving vehicle but the Marine Corps Warfighting Lab ended long-term development projects and all technology funding was cut.

== Operation ==
The Dragon Fire mortar system can be deployed mounted in an LAV-25, towed by a HMMWV, or air deployed by CH-53 Sea Stallion helicopter or V-22 Osprey. Fixing the weapon in an LAV does not require a separate mount; its towing carriage can be converted to an LAV mount in five minutes. After deployment, the crew can control the weapon system from a remote station. In operation, it is designed to be fully automatic: loading, computing firing solutions, aiming and firing automatically. From an unloaded condition, the weapon is capable of loading, completing a firing solution, aiming, and firing the first round within 18 seconds of receiving an order. The weapon is also capable of being operated manually in the event of failure of an automatic system. Because the Dragon Fire II contains its own GPS positioning system and pointing system (the Honeywell 5000HG Ring Laser Gyro) and on-board SINCGARS FM radio, it was also capable of controlling other like weapons, with the potential of one designated "Master Gun" controlling multiple other Dragon Fire Mortars in a synchronized manner.

The advanced fire control system is fully compatible with the US Army system, to reduce the risk of friendly fire (fratricide) incidents.

=== Types of rounds ===
The Dragon Fire system is designed to be able to use all NATO types of rifled and smoothbore 120 mm mortar ammunition. However, the USMC awarded Raytheon a contract to design, develop and demonstrate a new 120 mm long-range, guided-mortar munition for use with the M327 mortar. The new Precision Extended Range Munition (PERM) is expected to be ready for a live-fire demonstration by the summer of 2015. The 120 mm rifled mortar PERM round will give the EFSS a reach of 17 kilometres (11 mi), with a CEP of 20 m (66 ft). The prototype PERM rounds have a GPS antenna and small fins, canards, that provide lift and extend the range of the weapon. The Marine Corps acquisition program performed a shoot-off of the prototype mortar rounds developed by Raytheon and ATK. In December 2015, the Marine Corps awarded a five-year contract to Raytheon Missile Systems to deliver about 4,300 rounds. Each round, weighing 16 kg (35 lbs) each, costs $18,000 each, about $16,000 more than the non-precision rounds.

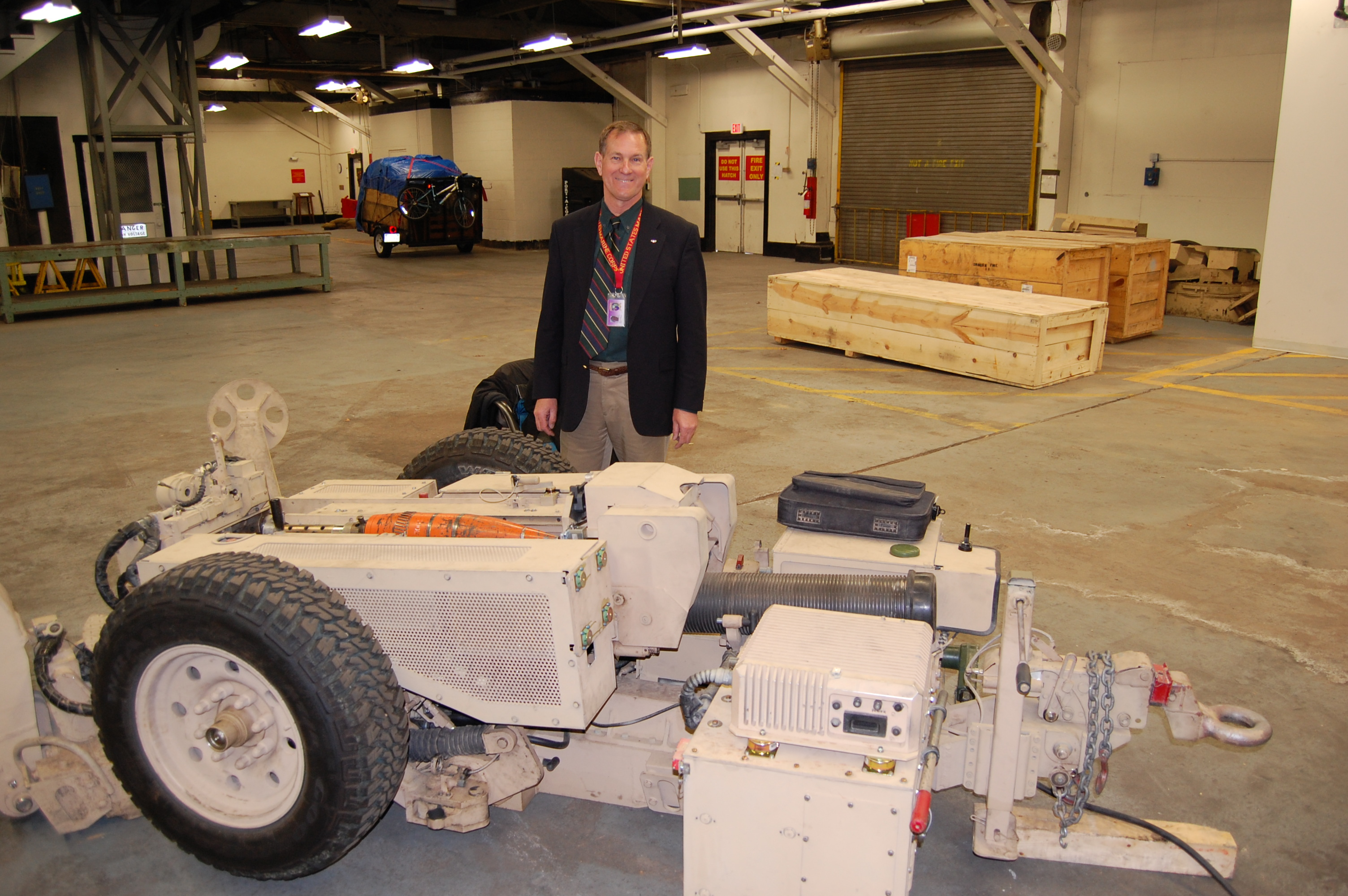
The Dragon Fire II at Quantico.

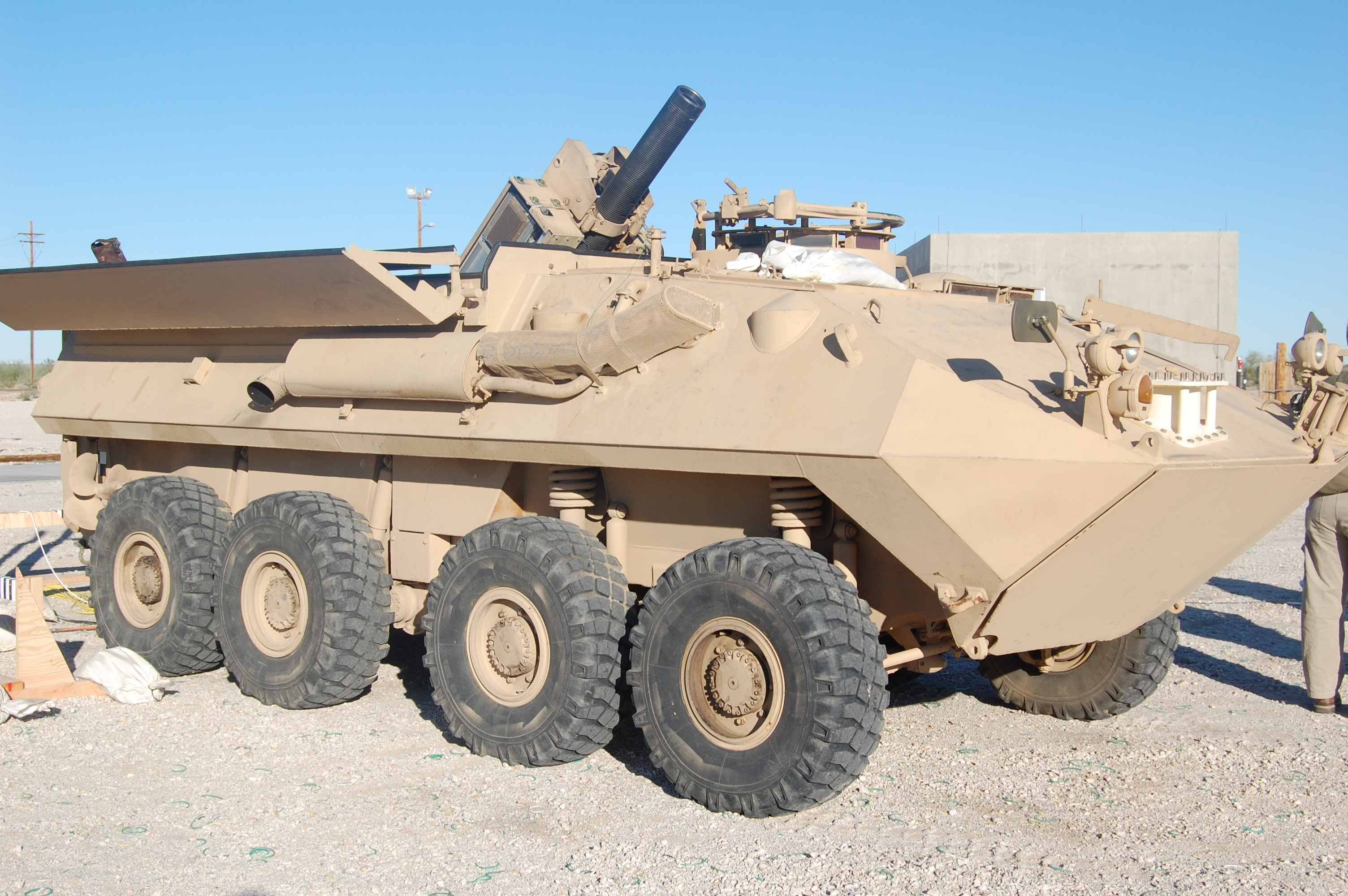
The Dragon Fire II in its LAV-M configuration, 2009.

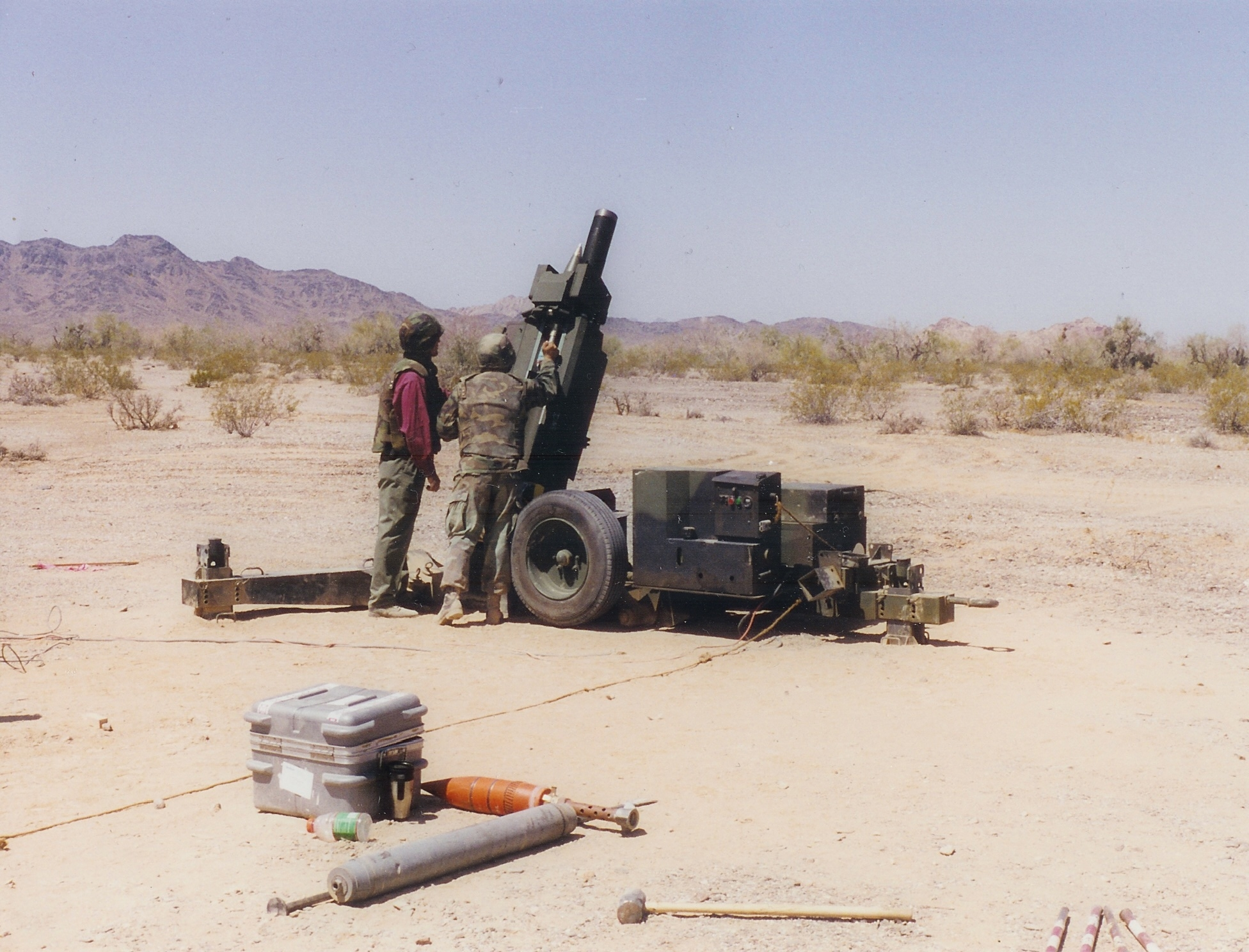
The original Dragon Fire prototype, using the TDA (France) upper portion of the 2R2M mortar system.

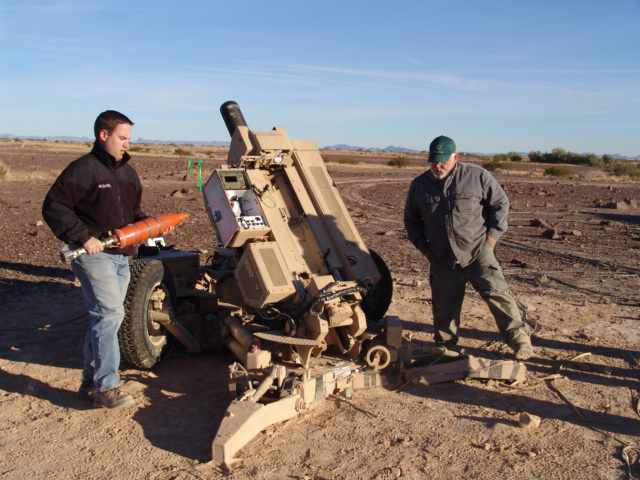
Dragon Fire II being set up for Engineering Tests, YPG.

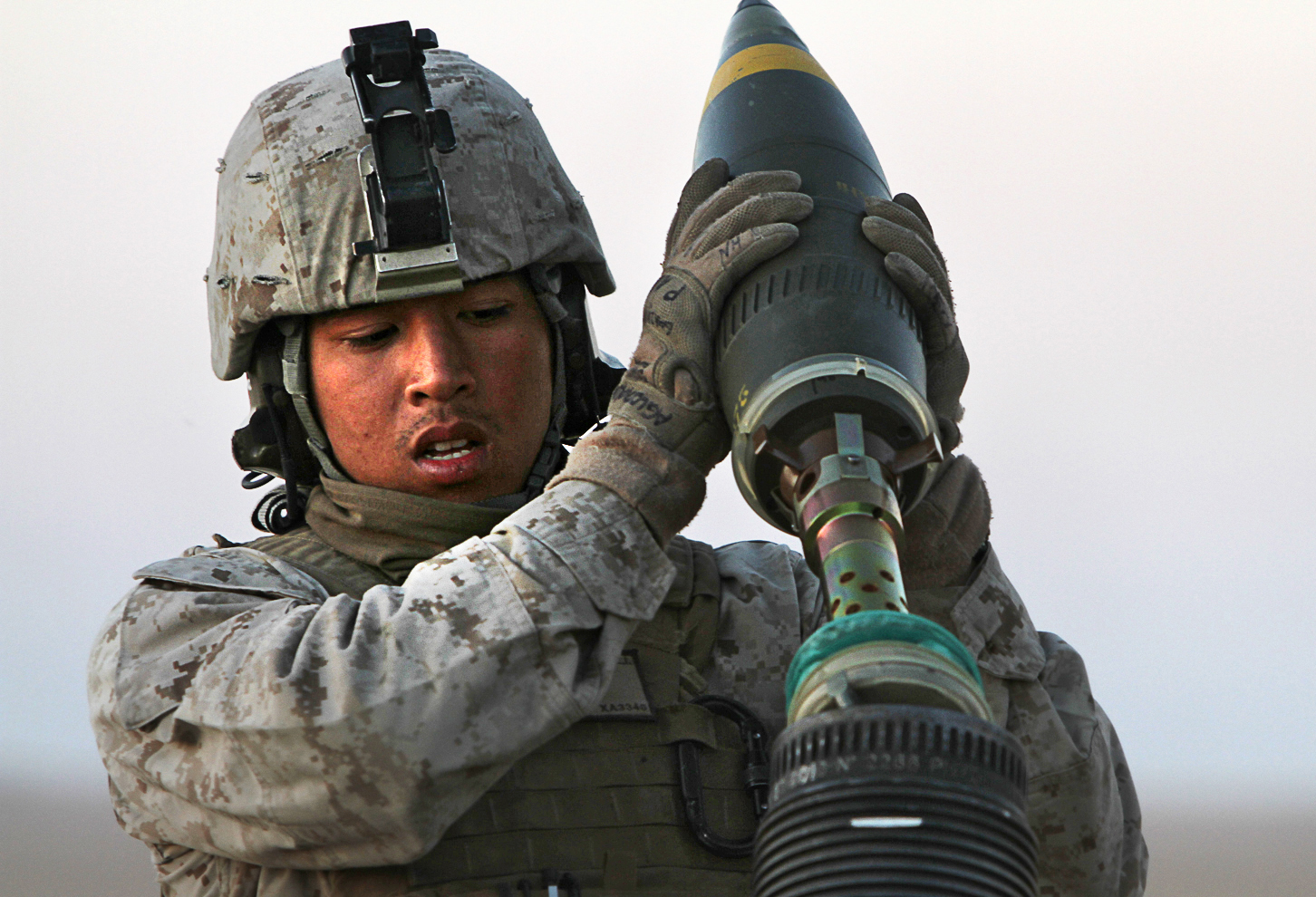
USMC High explosive round showing rifling.

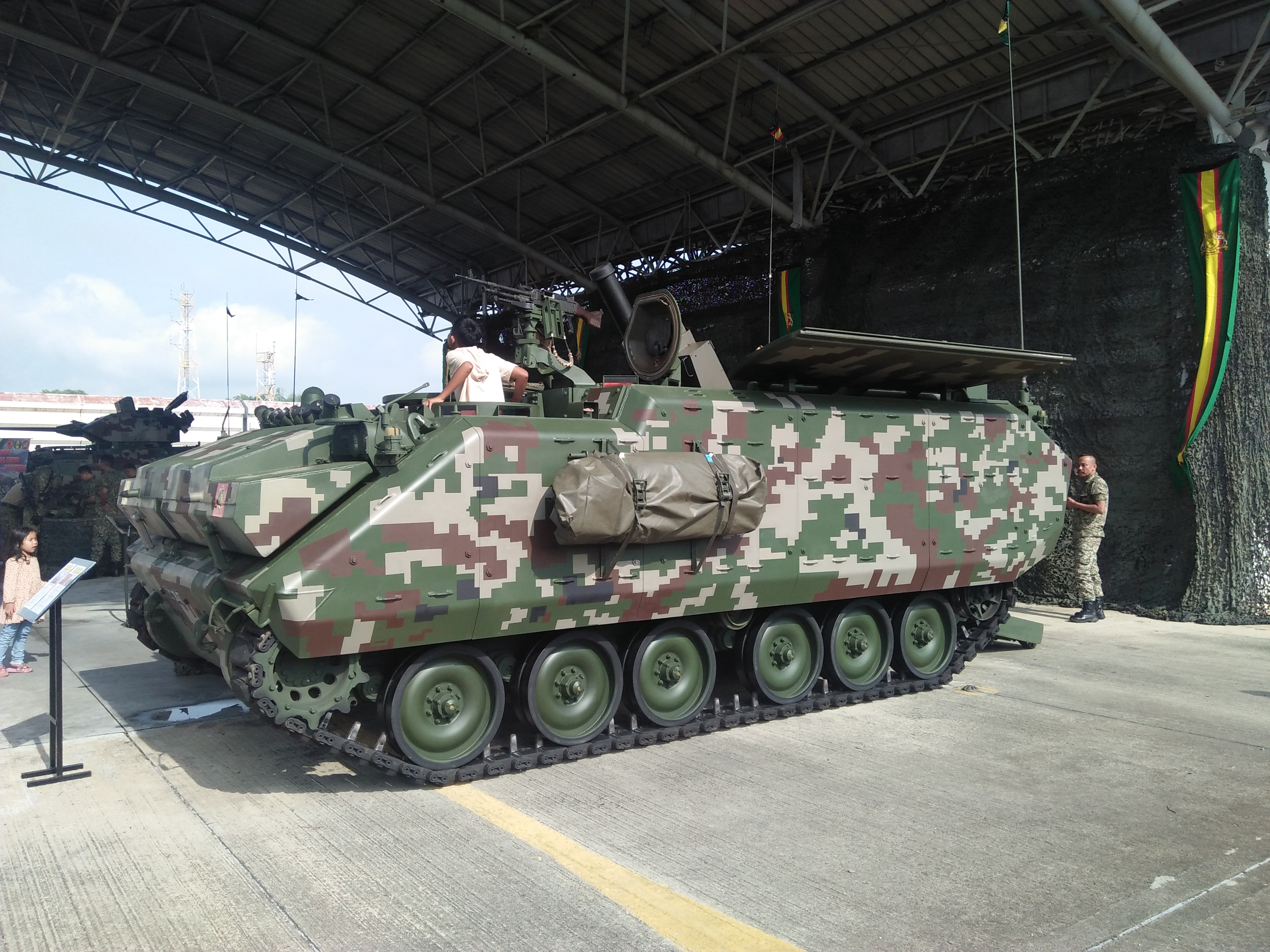
Malaysian Army ACV-300 Adnan 2R2M mortar carrier.

== Operators ==
=== Current operators ===
France (54)

54 Griffon MEPAC confirmed order in 2022 by the French Army, installed on the VBMR Griffon with the Thales 2R2M mortar system.
First delivery in January 2025.

Italy (35)

Italy operates the 2R2M based on its VBM Freccia. It was ordered in two phases:
- 21 VBM Porta Mortaio based on the Freccia phase 1.
- 14 VBM Porta Mortaio based on the Freccia PLUS (phase 2) approved in 2019.

Malaysia (16)

Malaysia operates the 2R2M mortars on two platforms:
- 8 FNSS ACV-S based on the FNSS ACV-15, purchased in 2010.
- 8 SPM 120, based on the DefTech AV8 ordered in 2011, finalised by 2019.

Oman (6)

Oman operates the 2R2M on VAB 6×6 vehicles.

Saudi Arabia (unknown quantity)

2R2M installed on the M113 of the Saudi National Guard.

=== Future operators ===
Belgium (24)

24 Griffon MEPAC ordered in 2024 by the Belgian Army installed on the VBMR Griffon with the Thales 2R2M mortar system.

Japan (9 confirmed orders)

The Japanese Army selected the Common tactical wheeled vehicle platform as future mortar carrier and known as the MMCV - Manoeuvre Mortar combat vehicle.
Orders:
- 1 prototype in 2019
- 8 ordered in 2024
In total, eventually, 100 are planned to be ordered.

=== Potential future systems ===
Brazil

The Brazilian Army is looking for a 120mm mortar system to be integrated to the Guarani 6×6. The competitors include:
- SRAMS by ST Kinetics
- Patria NEMO
- RUAG Cobra
- Elbit Cardom 120

Japan

The JGSDF is developing a platform to succeed to the Type 89 IFV and the Type 73 APC. Based on this platform, the Japanese Ground Self-Defence Force is planning to develop a mortar carrier. A likely competitor is the 2R2M system.

=== Failed bid ===
United States

In the early 2000s, the US Marine Corps tested a variant of the 2R2M system based on the LAV-M under the programme Dragon Fire and Dragon Fire II.
In the end, the USMC decided to g with the MO-120-RT towed mortar system to fill that need, towed by the M1161 EFSS (Growler Expeditionary Fire Support System).

== See also ==
- AMOS
