= Carrier Mortar Tracked =

Indian self-propelled mortar

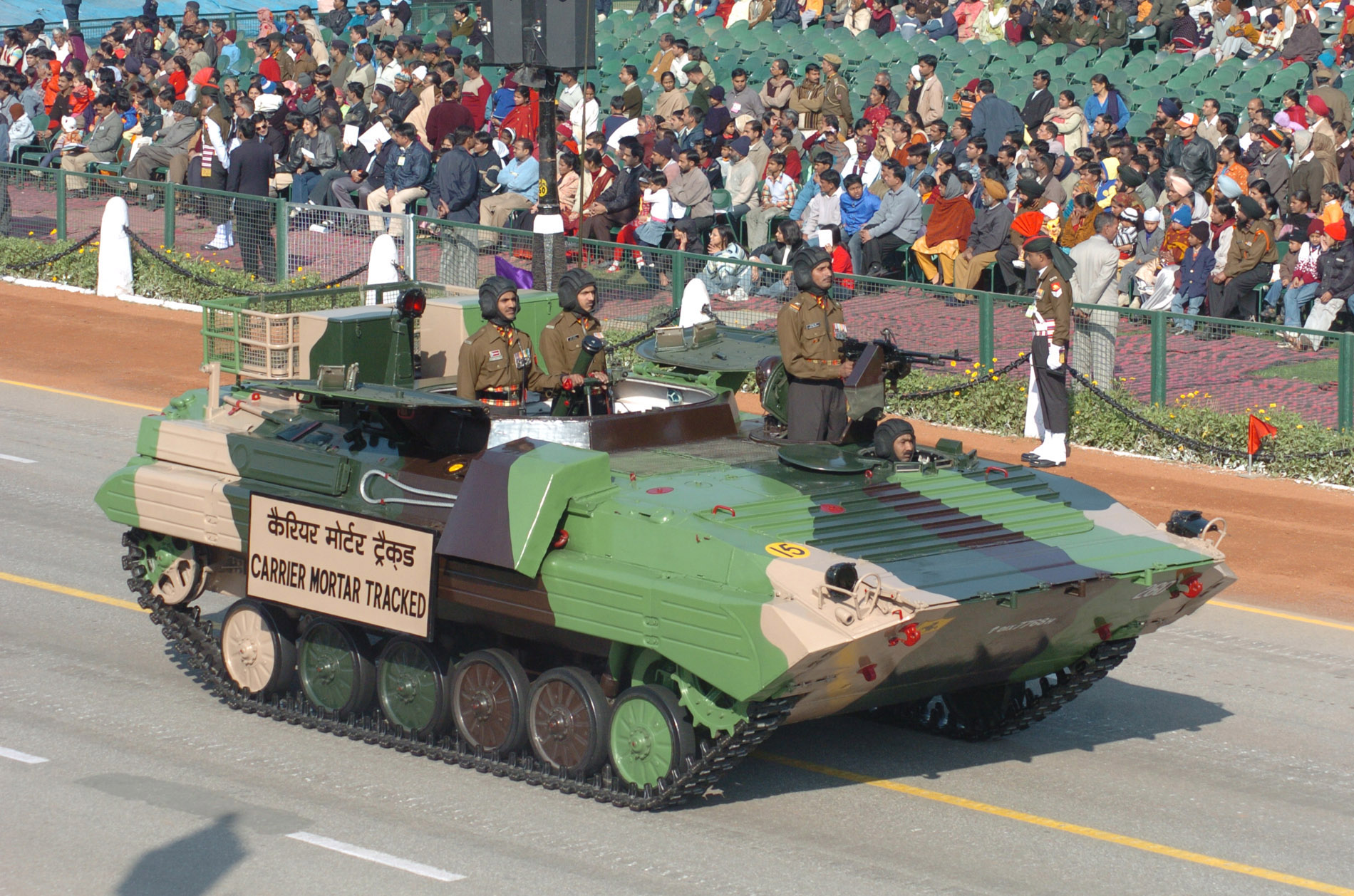
Carrier Mortar Tracked Vehicle

The Carrier Mortar Tracked (CMT) vehicle is a self-propelled mortar system developed by the Combat Vehicles Research and Development Establishment of Defence Research and Development Organisation (DRDO) in India. It is manufactured by AVANI.

== Description ==
The Carrier Mortar Tracked vehicle is based on "Sarath" ("Chariot of Victory") Indian licence-produced variant of BMP-2. This turret-less version has an 81 mm mortar mounted in the modified troop compartment. The mortar is fired through an opening in the hull roof that has two hinged doors. It has a maximum range of 5,000 m, a normal rate of fire of 6-8 rds/min and capacity to fire from 40° to 85° and traverse 24° on either side. There is also a long-range version of the mortar. The vehicle carries 108 mortar rounds and is also fitted with a 7.62 mm machine gun with 2,350 rounds. It can be operated by all mechanised infantry battalions moves along with the leading mechanised elements providing instantaneous fire support up to a depth of five km behind enemy lines. It can also provide protection to crew and mortar fires. Besides providing services like aerial targets, the vehicle also has amphibious capabilities.

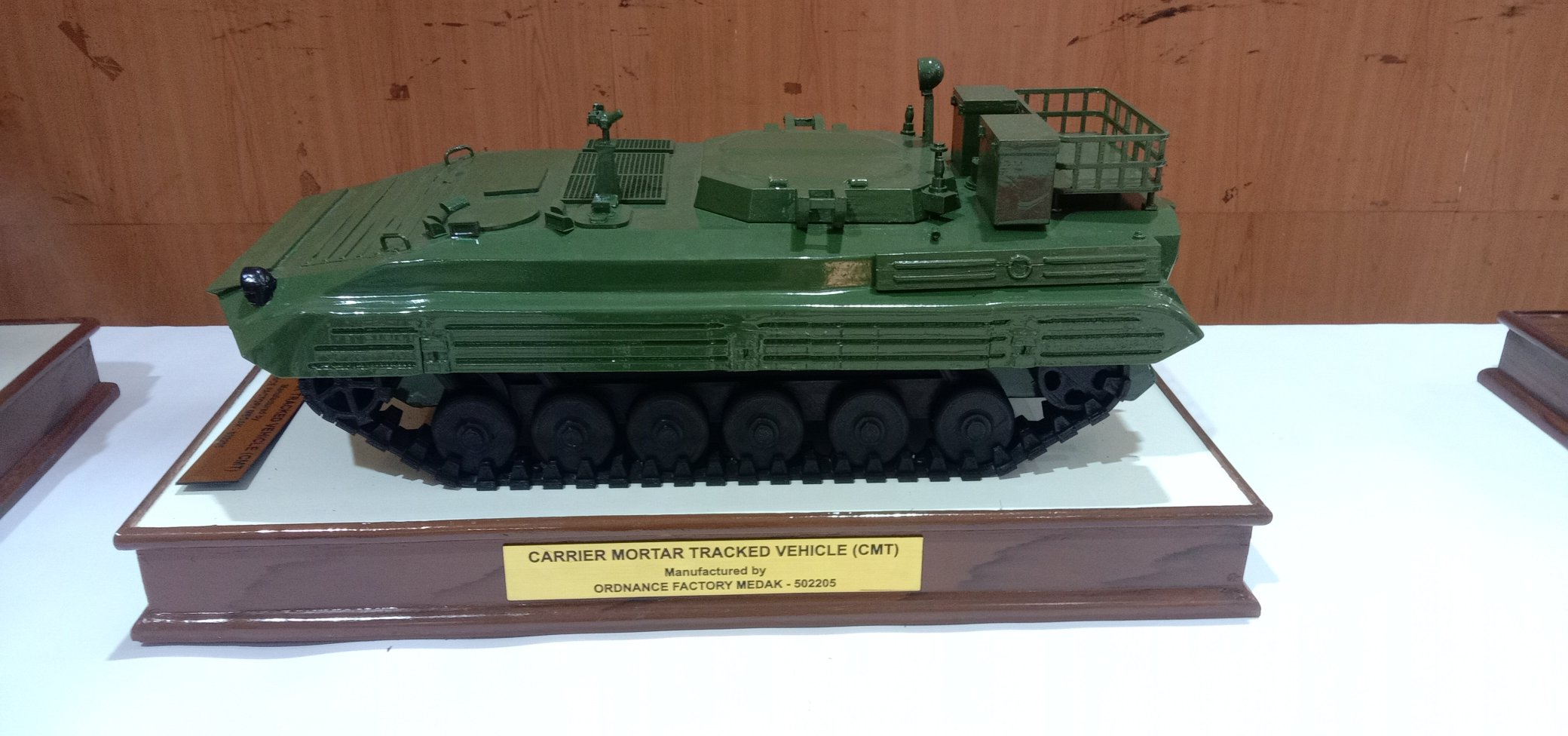

== Deployment ==
The first prototype was completed in 1997 and it is currently in production at the Ordnance Factory Board, India. India manufactured around 220 CMT.

== Specification ==
- Crew infantry: 2 + 4
- Weight (tonnes): 13

== Performance ==
- Engine power (HP): 300
- Power to weight ratio (HP/T): 23
- Maximum speed (km/h):
  - On road: 65
  - Cross country: 48
  - In water (km/h): 7
- Trench crossing (metres): 2.3
- Maximum gradient (degrees): 35

== Weapon system ==
- 81 mm mortar
- Traverse: 24 degrees to either side of mean position
- Elevation: 40 degrees to 85 degrees
- Ammunition: 108 rounds
- 84 mm RCL Gun (shoulder fired)
- Ammunition: 12 rounds
- 7.62 mm M/C Gun in A/D role (for aerial targets)
- Ammunition: 2350 rounds

== Other ==
- Drinking water: 320 litres
- Mortar base plate stowed for ground firing
