= MEPAC =

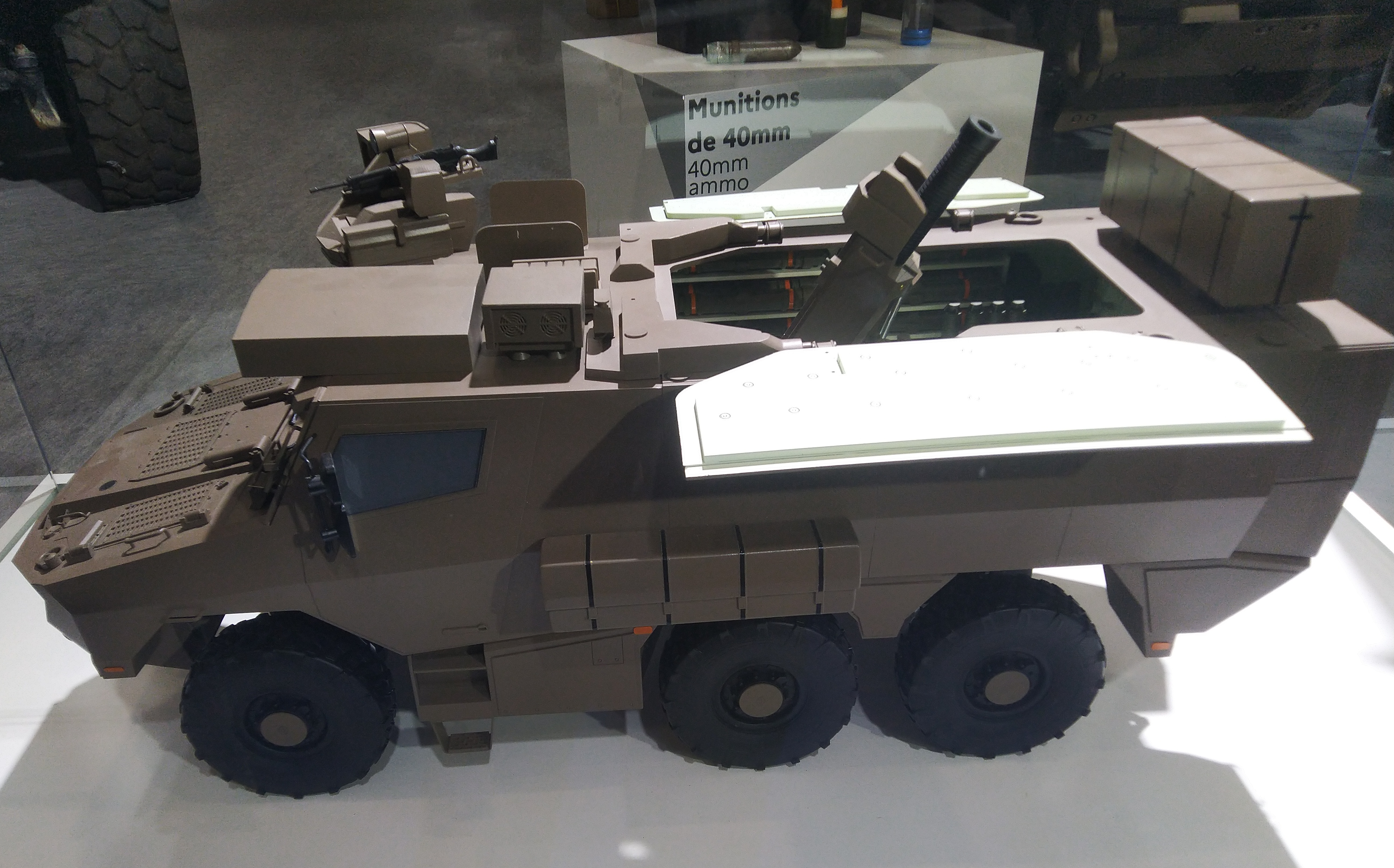
- VBMR Griffon MEPAC maquette
- Type: Self-propelled mortar carrier
- Place of origin: France

Service history
- In service: 2025-

Production history
- Manufacturer: Nexter Systems; Thales

Specifications
- Mass: 24,5 tonnes
- Main armament: 2R2M 120 mm semi-automatic mortar system
- Secondary armament: RWS with 7.62 mm machine gun
- Engine: Diesel
- Suspension: 6x6 wheel

MEPAC also Griffon MEPAC (Mortier Embarqué Pour l'Appui au Contact; English: Embedded mortar for contact support) is a French six-wheel self-propelled mortar carrier.

The system is to be integrated on a dedicated variant of the Griffon, designated Griffon MEPAC. An evolution of the Thales 2R2M 120 mm semi-automatic mortar system, it can fire up to ten rounds per minute against targets up to 13 km away with improved accuracy; the vehicle can then set itself in motion while closing the roof hatches at the same time. Two new developments for the shells are expected; the MURAT 120 mm reduced-risk ammunition, offering a 12% increase in maximum range with no loss of effectiveness, and a metric-precision ammunition with a 15 km range.

As it can be put into road position as quickly as into battery, it is designed to avoid counter-battery fire more easily, while providing better protection for the crew. The Griffon MEPAC, like the Griffon EPC, is virtually indistinguishable from the Griffon VTT Félin from the outside. Whereas the latter is designed to carry 10 fully-equipped soldiers, the MEPAC will accommodate a reduced crew of four artillerymen, namely the pilot, the gun leader and two soldiers operating the MEPAC. The chief will switch from the front of the vehicle during the driving phase, to a position at the rear to command the battery and firing. Reducing the crew from five as originally intended to four has also freed up considerable space for additional ammunition. The turntable-mounted mortar can be rotated through 360° and has a hydraulic-powered elevation range of 40° to 85°. The Griffon MEPAC will be equipped with a computerized fire-control system, automatic laying system and inertial navigation system from Thales as well as a T2 Hornet Lite remotely-operated turret armed with a 7.62 mm machine gun and fitted with the GALIX.

MEPAC will also be integrated into the ATLAS (Automatisation des Tirs et Liaisons de l’Artillerie Sol/sol; English: Automated firing and ground-to-ground artillery links) artillery system, while retaining the option of firing in degraded mode (tube movement by manual pump, orientation by goniometer, manual loading from roof hatches and firing under manual control). 54 units are to be delivered to the French Army from the fourth quarter of 2023 to 2027, with a prototype scheduled for delivery as soon as 2020, and qualification testing expected to take place between 2022 and 2023.

== Operators ==
=== Current operators ===
France (54)

- first MEPACs from 54 total ordered in 2022 by the French Army. First delivery in January 2025.

=== Future operators ===
Belgium (24)

- 24 MEPAC order

== See also ==
- CAESAR, French self-propelled howitzer (2008–present)
- AMX-30 AuF1, French self-propelled howitzer (1977–2020s)
- Mk F3, historical French self-propelled artillery (1960s, 1970s)
- Mk 61, historical French self-propelled howitzer (1950s, 1960s)
- Mortier 280 mm TR de Schneider sur affût-chenilles St Chamond, historical French self-propelled siege howitzer (1919–1945)
- Canon de 194 GPF, historical French self-propelled gun (1920–1942)
- List of mortar carriers
