= M21 mortar carrier =

T19/M21 mortar motor carriage
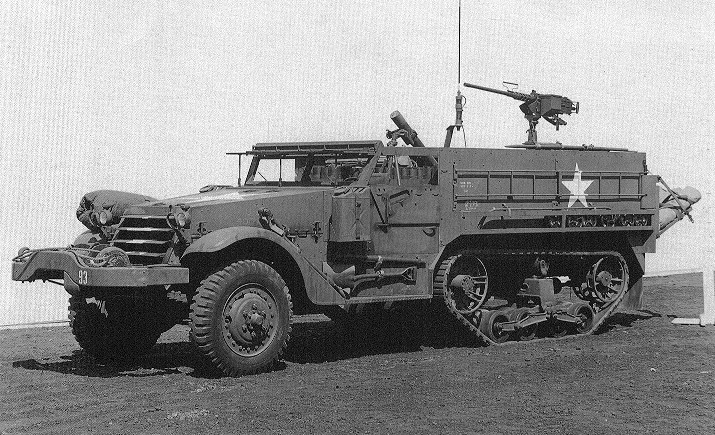
- 1944 photograph of a M21 mortar motor carriage
- Type: Self-propelled artillery
- Place of origin: United States

Service history
- In service: 1944–45
- Used by: United States
- Wars: World War II

Production history
- Designer: Ordnance department
- Designed: 1942–43
- Manufacturer: White Motor Company
- Produced: 1944
- No. built: 110

Specifications
- Mass: 9 tons
- Length: 20 ft 9 in (6.32 m)
- Width: 7 ft 3 in (2.22 m)
- Height: 7 ft 5 in (2.26 m)
- Armor: Rolled face-hardened steel, between 6–13 mm (0.24–0.51 in) thick
- Main armament: 81 mm M1 mortar
- Secondary armament: 0.5 inch (12.7 mm) M2 machine gun
- Engine: White 160AX, 6,330 cc (386 in^{3}) 6-cylinder, gasoline (petrol) compression ratio 6.3:1; 128 hp (95 kW)
- Power/weight: 15.8 hp/ton
- Suspension: tracks: Vertical volute springs; front leaf spring
- Fuel capacity: 60 US gal (230 L)
- Operational range: 150 mi (240 km)
- Maximum speed: 45 mph (72 km/h)

The M21 mortar motor carriage (MMC) was a self-propelled artillery mount on a half-track chassis used by the United States Army during World War II. It was equipped with an 81 mm M1 mortar and an air-cooled M2 Browning machine gun. It was produced by the White Motor Company in 1944. Only 110 examples were produced.

It mainly served on the Western Front in Normandy, and Southern France, and then later in the Ardennes during the Battle of the Bulge. It was deemed to have been outclassed in 1945 when the 81 mm M1 mortar was found to have insufficient power to provide effective artillery support.

== Development ==
The M4 was developed to meet the need for a specialized mortar carrier based on the M2 half-track car, which the M21 soon replaced. The initial M4 was designed to carry a mortar. In emergencies, the mortar could be fired from the vehicle. The improved M4A1 had a reinforced floor so that the mortar could be fired from the vehicle, but the mounting faced to the rear and lacked traverse. This caused problems when the troops who operated the mortar mounted the vehicle, so the US 2nd Armored Division relocated the mortars so that they could fire from the front.

The Ordnance Department followed suit and a new 81 mm MMC, the T19 MMC, was created, which was based on the larger M3 half-track. Developmental trials of the T19 were completed in July 1943, and the vehicle was later standardized as the M21 MMC.

== Design ==
The M21 had a different layout from the early M4 and M4A1 MMC. The major difference was the location and direction of the mortar (the M4's mortar was rear-facing and was near the back, while the M21's mortar was front-facing and was closer to the front).

The mortar was able to traverse 30° either side and elevate from 40° to 80°. If required, it could be de-mounted from the vehicle and fired from the ground. In addition, there was a pedestal mount at the rear for a .50 cal (12.7 mm) M2 heavy machine gun.

== Specifications ==
The specifications for the M21 are similar to the specifications for its parent vehicle, the M3 half-track. The vehicle was 20 ft 9 in (6.32 m) long, 7 ft 3 in (2.22 m) wide, and 7 ft 5 in (2.26 m) high with a wheelbase of 135.5 in (3.44 m). The suspension for the front wheels were leaf springs and track's suspension used a vertical volute spring. Powered by a White 160AX, 128 hp (95 kW), 386 in^{3} (6,330 cc), 6-cylinder petrol engine with a compression ratio of 6.3:1, the M21 could reach up to 45 mph (72 km/h) on a road. The fuel capacity was 60 US gal (230 L) and the vehicle had a range of 150 mi (240 km). It had a power-to-weight ratio of 15.8 hp/ton with the vehicle weighing nine tons.

== Service history ==
The M21 served on the Western Front, seeing action in Normandy and in southern France, before later being used during the Battle of the Bulge, the Battle of Belgium, Operation Market Garden, and the invasion of Germany from the west. The M21 served with the US 3rd, 1st, and 7th Armies during the campaign in France, and the 2nd Armored Division, which developed it. In addition, 57 examples were leased to Free French forces. By 1945, it was declared obsolete, due to the insufficient power of the 81 mm mortar as an artillery piece.

Standard US tank and armored infantry battalions had a mortar platoon equipped with either M21s or the older M4 MMCs. The M21 was used mainly to illuminate targets at night or provide indirect fire support to the infantry. The usage was uncommon because the White Motor Company was only able to produce 110 M21s in 1944.

In 1955, the United States leased 23 M21s to the newly formed Bundesheer following the signing of the Austrian State Treaty that re-established Austria as a sovereign state. In 1968, all but one of the M21s were returned to the US Army. The remaining M21 was stored outside until 2003, after which it was restored to running condition and placed on display in the tank hall at the Heeresgeschichtliches Museum.

== Operators ==
- Austria
- Free France
- United States

== See also ==
- List of U.S. military vehicles by model number
- List of U.S. military vehicles by supply catalog designation
