= LLR 81mm =

Mortier de 81mm léger long renforcé
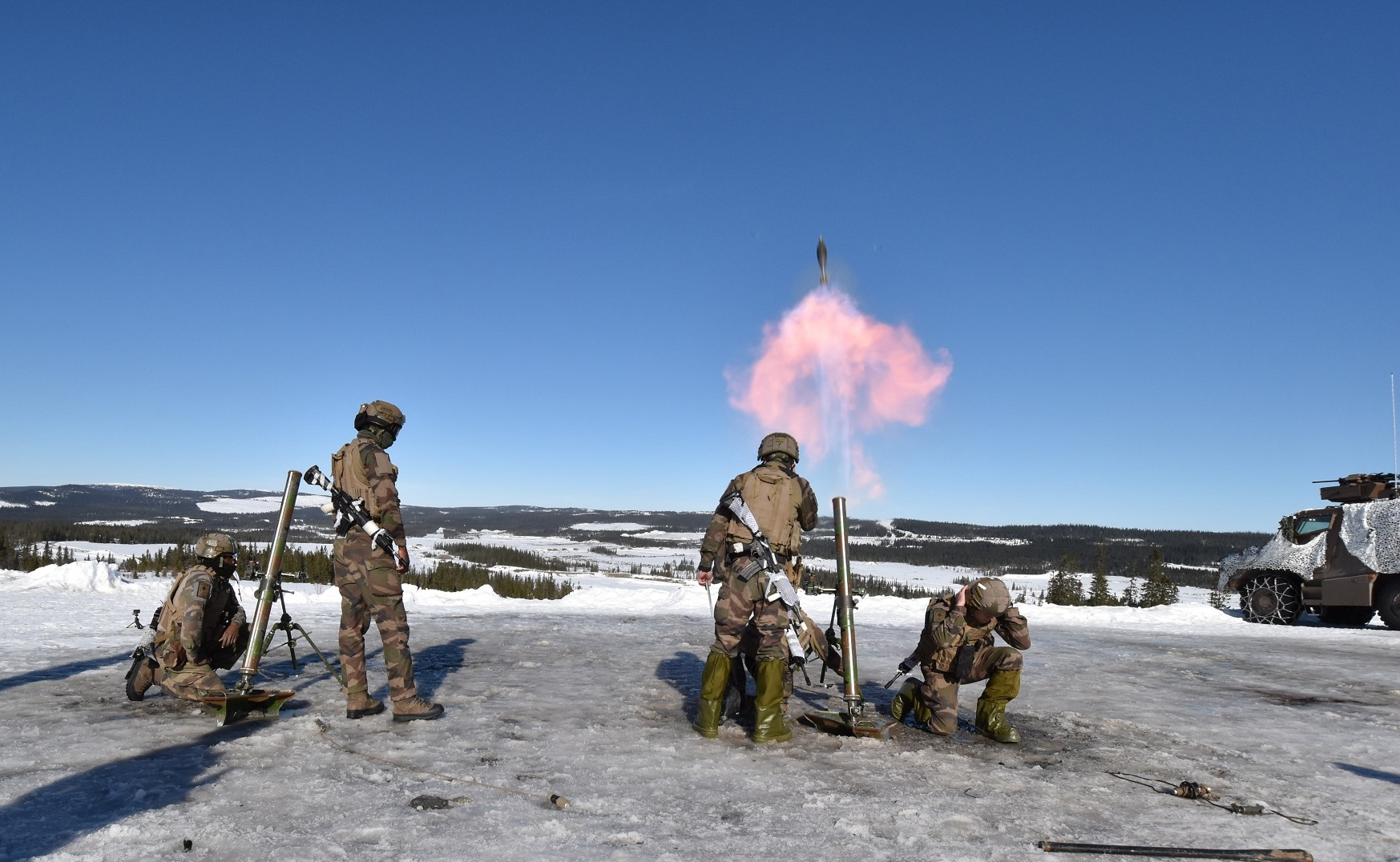
- Mo 81 LLR of the French Army 1st Infantry Regiment during Exercise Cold Response (Norway, 2022)
- Type: Mortar
- Place of origin: France

Service history
- Used by: See users
- Wars: Battle of Kolwezi (MO-81-61-C); Rhodesian Bush War; War in Afghanistan (2001–2021); Northern Mali Conflict; Central African Civil War; 2025 India–Pakistan strikes

Production history
- Designed: 1997
- Produced: 1997 - present

Specifications
- Mass: 45.2 kg (100 lb) (total); 18.3 kg (40 lb) (barrel); 12.6 kg (28 lb) (bipod); 14.6 kg (32 lb) (base)
- Barrel length: 1,639 mm (5 ft 4.5 in)
- Crew: 5 men
- Calibre: 81 mm (3.2 in)
- Rate of fire: 12 to 20 rpm.
- Effective firing range: 3,100 m (3,400 yd) with model 1944 shell. 5,600 m (6,100 yd) with special ammunition.

The Mortier de 81mm léger long renforcé (LLR 81 mm) is a mortar used by the French Army, manufactured by Thales. Introduced in 1997, it is the latest iteration of the TDA 81 mm light mortar family.

== Description ==
The original TDA 81 mm was designed in 1961 (hence the MO-81-61 designation). Since then, three variants have been fielded:

- the 81mm LC or MO-81-61-C (Léger court, "light short"), with a 1.15-metre barrel;
- the 81mm LL or MO-81-61-L (Léger long, "light long"), with a 1.55-metre barrel;
- the 81mm LLR (Léger long renforcé, "light long reinforced"), paratrooper version with a 1.55-metre barrel.

The LLR 81mm is composed of a base plate, a barrel comprising the breech, and a bipod. It can use the same pointing optics as the MO-120-RT-61.

The LLR 81mm can be parachuted either piece by piece, in a kit comprising a dismantled weapon and ammunition, or in larger crates comprising several weapons. The barrel was reinforced so as to allow firing of all existing 81 mm mortar ammunition.

== Users ==
- Benin: MO-81-61
- France: MO-81-61-C and MO-81-LLR (2 per infantry company of the French Army in the 2010s)
- Ireland: Light long-barrel version
- Italy: MO-81-LL built under license by OTO Melara.
- Kuwait: South African M8 mortar.
- Malaysia: South African M8 mortar version.
- Pakistan: MO-81-LL built under license.
- Peru: South African M8 mortar.
- South Africa: MO-81-61 produced by Vektor as M3 mortar and M8 mortar (upgraded variant with heavier barrel).

=== Former users ===
- Rhodesia
