= M1 mortar =

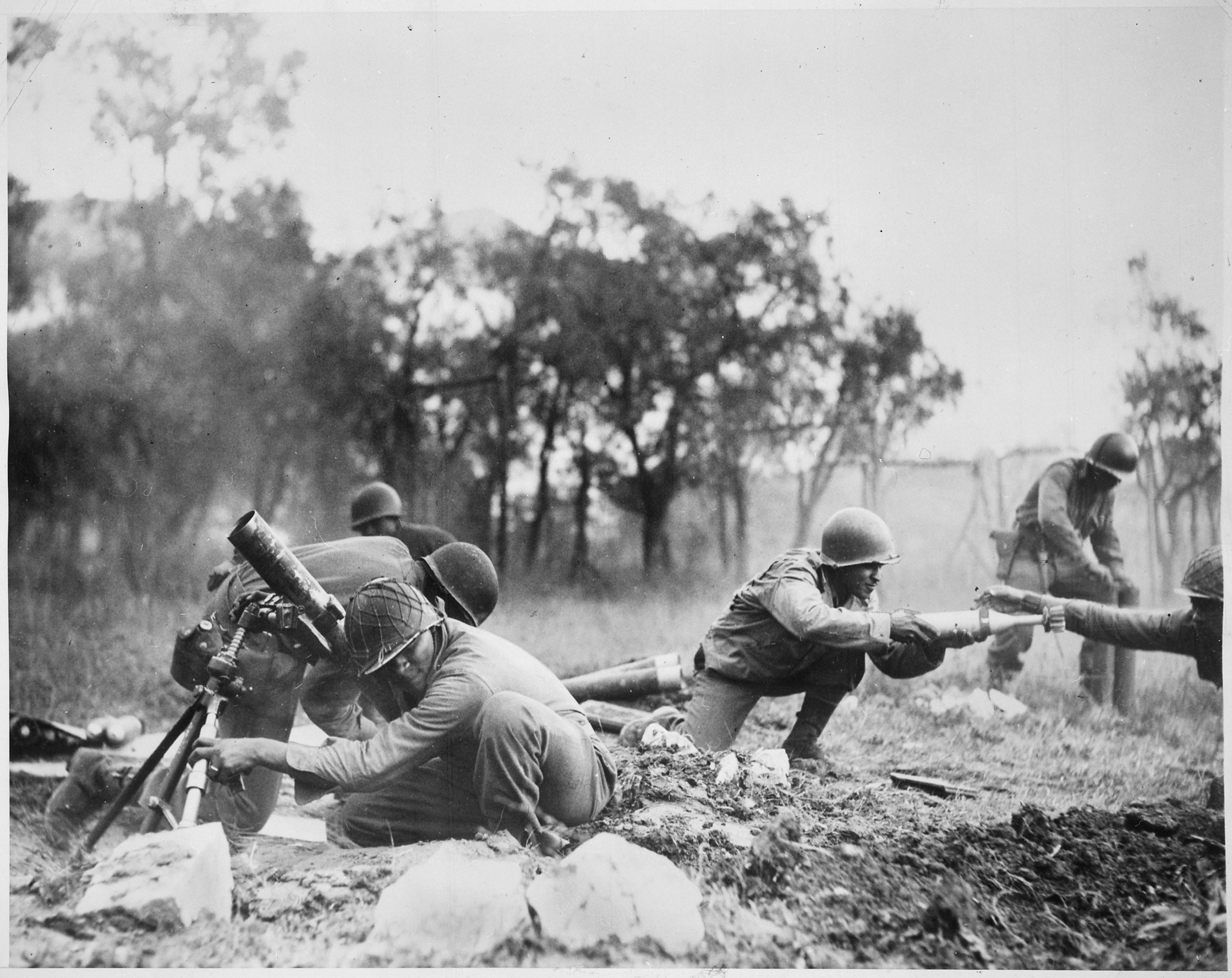
- G.I.'s of the 92nd Infantry Division fire an M1 mortar at Massa in Italy during World War II.
- Type: Infantry mortar
- Place of origin: United States

Service history
- In service: 1935–1952
- Used by: United States; Vietnam; Other users
- Wars: World War II; Korean War; Algerian War; Vietnam War; Nicaraguan Revolution; Salvadoran Civil War

Specifications
- Mass: see general data
- Length: 3 ft 11 in (1.19 m)
- Crew: 8 (squad leader, gunner, assistant gunner, 5 ammunition bearers)
- Shell: see ammunition
- Caliber: 81 mm (3.2 in)
- Rate of fire: 18 rpm sustained 30-35 rpm maximum
- Muzzle velocity: 700 ft/s (210 m/s)
- Maximum firing range: 3,300 yd (3,000 m)
- Sights: M4

The M1 mortar is an American 81 millimeter caliber mortar. It was based on the French Brandt mortar. The M1 mortar was used from before World War II until the 1950s when it was replaced by the lighter and longer ranged M29 mortar.

The VPA used many M1 mortars captured from France (equipped by the US) and self-produced, equipped to battalions and regiments.

== General data ==
Weight:

- Tube 44.5 lb (20 kg)
- Mount 46.5 lb (21 kg)
- Base plate 45 lb (20 kg)
  - Total 136 pounds (62 kg)

== Ammunition ==
- M43A1 light HE: 7.05 lb (3.20 kg); HE filling 1.22 lb (0.55 kg); range min 100 yd (91 m); range max 3300 yd (zone 7, 3018 m); 80% frag radius 25 yd (23 m) (compared favorably with the 75 mm howitzer). M52 superquick fuze (explode on surface).
- M43A1 light training: an empty version of the M43A1 light HE with an inert fuze. It was used as a training shell until it was replaced by the M68 training practice shell.
- M45 heavy HE: 15.10 lb (6.85 kg); HE filling 4.48 lb (2.03 kg); range max 1275 yd (zone 5, 1166 m); bursting radius comparable to the 105 mm howitzer. Equipped with M45 (super quick/delay action selective) or M53 (delay action only) P.D. fuze.
- M56 heavy HE: 10.77 lb (4.86 kg); HE filling 4.31 lb (1.96 kg); range max 2655 yd (zone 5, 2428 m), standard for issue and manufacture shell replacing M45. It used the M53 fuze back in 1944, but it was at some point replaced by the M77 Timed Super Quick (TSQ) fuze.
- M57 WP (white phosphorus) "bursting smoke": 10.74 lb (4.87 kg); range max 2470 yd (2260 m); designed to lay down screening smoke, but had definite anti-personnel and incendiary applications.
- M57 FS (a solution of sulfur trioxide in chlorosulfonic acid) chemical smoke: 10.74 lb (4.87 kg), range max 2470 yd (2260 m); laid down dense white fog consisting of small droplets of hydrochloric and sulfuric acids. In moderate concentrations, it is highly irritating to the eyes, nose, and skin.
- M68 training practice: 9.50 lb to 10.10 lb. An inert teardrop-shaped cast iron shell without provision for a fuze well that was used to simulate the M43 light HE shell. The casing on early models was painted black but post-World War 2 versions are painted blue. It came in 9 different weights (engraved on the shell) to allow it to simulate shell firing with and without booster charges. Weight zone one (9.5 lbs.) simulated a shell with the maximum of 8 booster charges and weight zone nine (10.10 lbs.) simulated the shell being fired without booster charges.
- M301 illuminating shell: range max 2200 yd (2012 m); attached to parachute; burned brightly (275,000 candelas) for about 60 seconds, illuminating an area of about 150 yards (137 m) diameter. It used the M84 time fuze, which was adjustable from 5 to 25 seconds before priming charge detonated, releasing the illuminator and chute.

== Fuzes ==
The M1 mortar's shells sometimes used the same fuzes as the shells for the M2 60 mm mortar. An adapter collar was added to the smaller fuzes to allow them to fit the larger shells.

- M43 mechanical timing (MT) fuze: clockwork timed delay fuze. Models M43A5.
- M45 point detonating (PD) fuze: selective fuze that could be set for time delay or super-quick (less than a second) detonation on impact. Replaced by the M52 and M53 fuzes.
- M48 point detonating (PD) fuze: selective powder train burning fuze that can be set to super quick or delay ignition on impact. The factory pre-set delay time was stamped on the shell body. If the super-quick flash ignition failed, the delay fuse kicked in. If set on delay, the super-quick flash igniter mechanism was immobilized to prevent premature ignition. Models: M48, M48A1, M48A2 (either 0.05 or 0.15 second Delay), & M48A3 (0.05 second delay).
- M51 point detonating (PD) fuze: selective powder train burning fuze that can be set to super quick or delay ignition after impact. It is a modification of the M48 fuze with the addition of a booster charge. Models: M51A4, M51A5 (M48A3 Fuze with M21A4 booster).
- M52 point detonating super-quick (PDSQ) fuze: super-quick fuze that activates less than a second after impact. The pre-war M52 was made of aluminum, the M52B1 model was made of Bakelite, and the M52B2 model had a Bakelite body and an aluminum head; the suffix would be added to the shell designation.
- M53 point detonating delay (PDD) fuze: delay fuze that activates after impact.
- M54 time and super-quick (TSQ) fuze: powder train burning fuze that can be set for time delay (slow burn) or super-quick (flash ignition) detonation on impact.
- M77 time and super quick (TSQ) fuze: powder train burning fuze that can be set for time delay (slow burn) or super-quick (flash ignition) detonation on impact.
- M78 concrete penetrating (CP) fuze: delay fuze that was set off after the shell had impacted and buried itself to increase the damage done.
- M84 mechanical timing (MT) fuze: clockwork fuze that can be set from 0 to 25 seconds in 1-second intervals; seconds were indicated by vertical lines and 5-second intervals were indicated by metal bosses to allow it to be set in low-light or night-time conditions.
- M84A1 mechanical timing (MT) fuze: clockwork fuze that can be set from 0 to 50 seconds in 2-second intervals.

== Users ==
It may be found in nearly all the non-Communist countries, including:

- Austria: used on M21 mortar motor carriage
- Belgium: made under license
- Republic of China
- Colombia
- Dominican Republic
- El Salvador
- Ethiopia
- France
- Greece
- Guatemala
- Haiti
- Honduras
- Japan
- Laos
- Libya
- Mexico
- Myanmar:M-43
- South Korea: The Armed Forces was equipped with 386 M1s before the Korean War, and 822 were in service with the Army by the end of the war. Replaced with M29A1 or KM29A1 in 1970s.
- Turkey
- Thailand
- United States
- Uruguay
- South Vietnam
- North Vietnam
- Vietnam

== See also ==
- M2 Mortar
- List of U.S. Army weapons by supply catalog designation SNL A-33
- M3 Half-track

=== Weapons of comparable role, performance and era ===
- Ordnance ML 3 inch Mortar British equivalent
- 8 cm Granatwerfer 34 German equivalent
