= Mortar carrier =

Combat vehicle with a mortar as its primary weapon

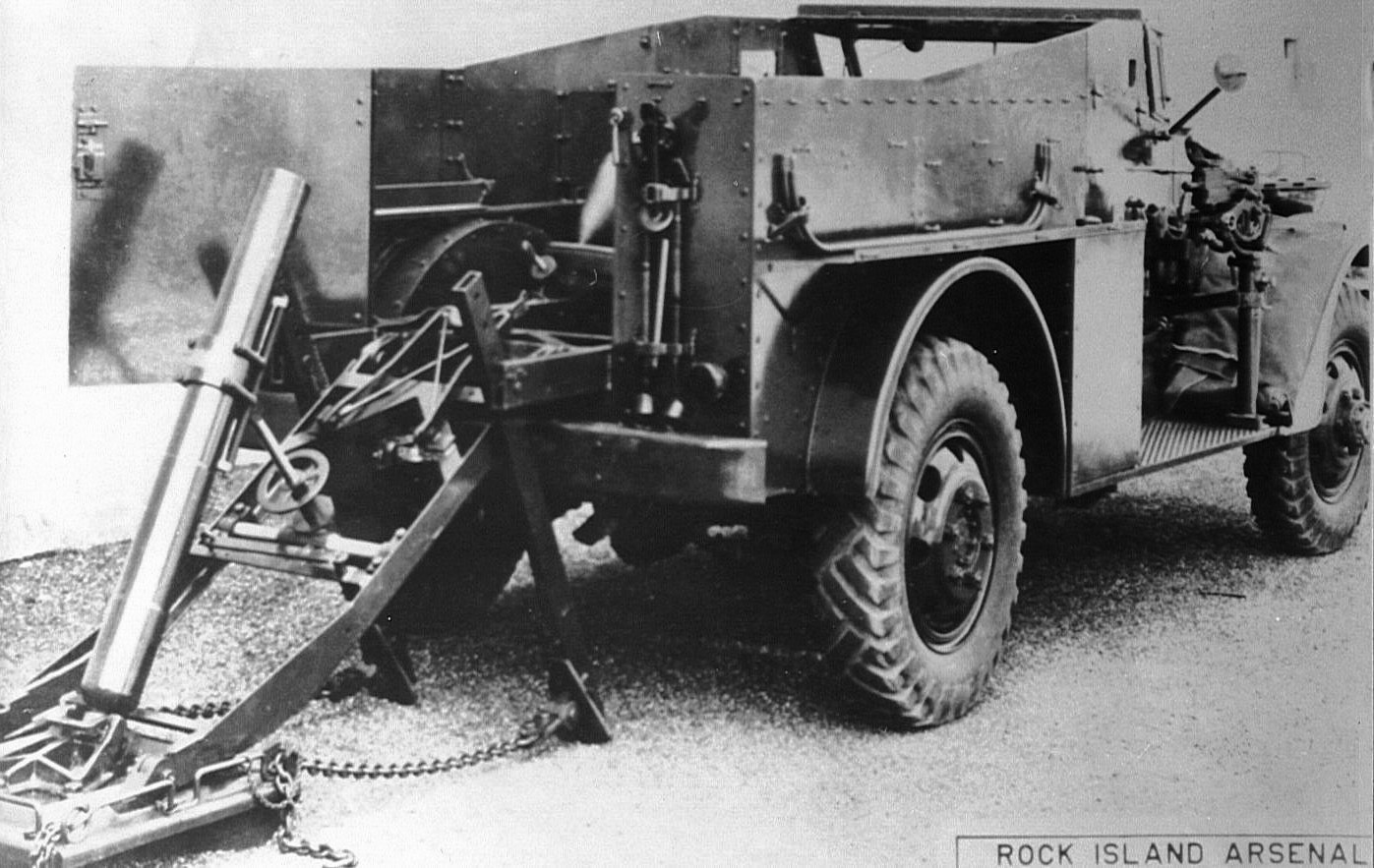
T5E1 4.2-inch mortar carrier variant of the M3 Scout Car

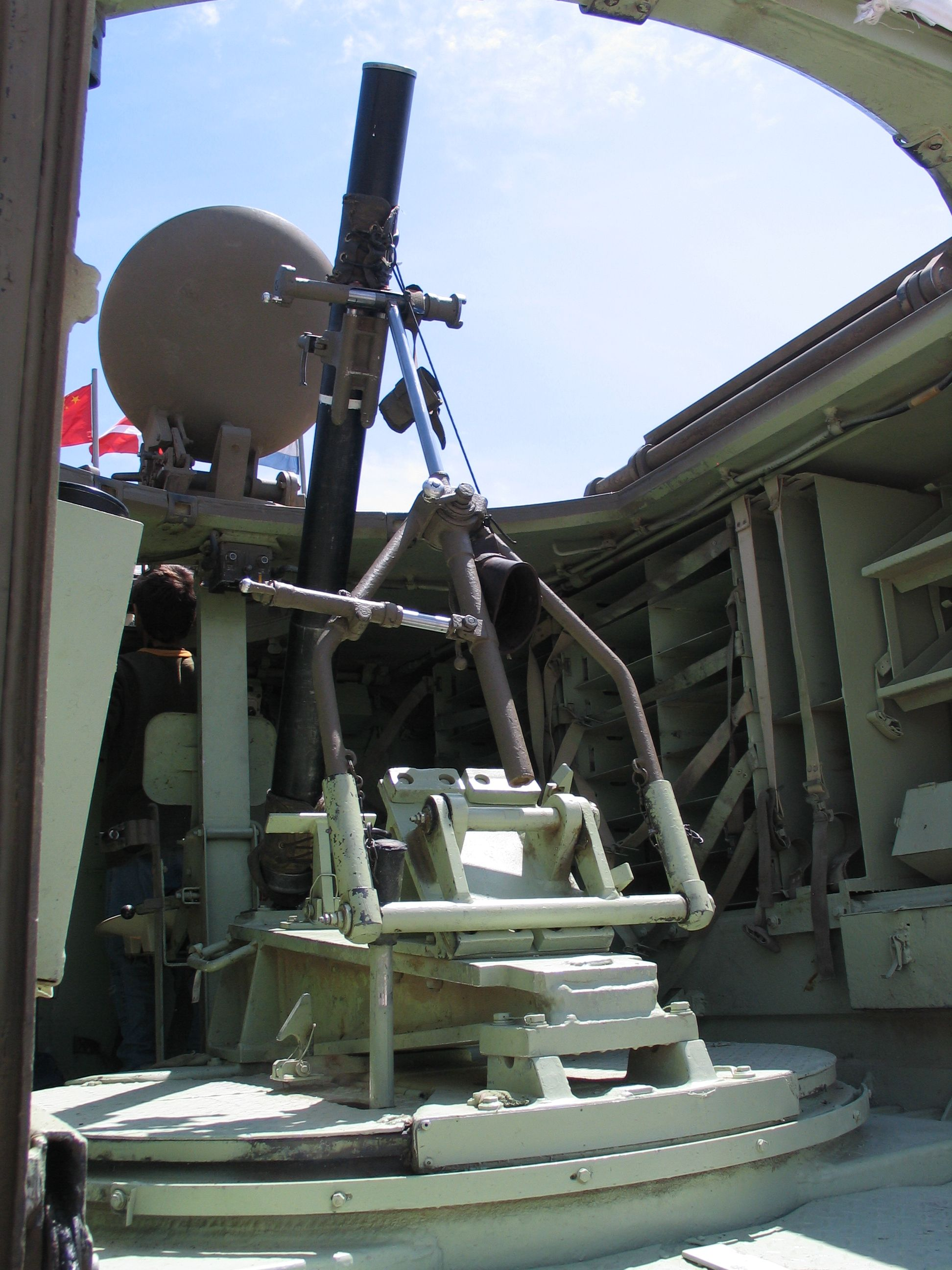
Interior of an IDF M113 mortar carrier

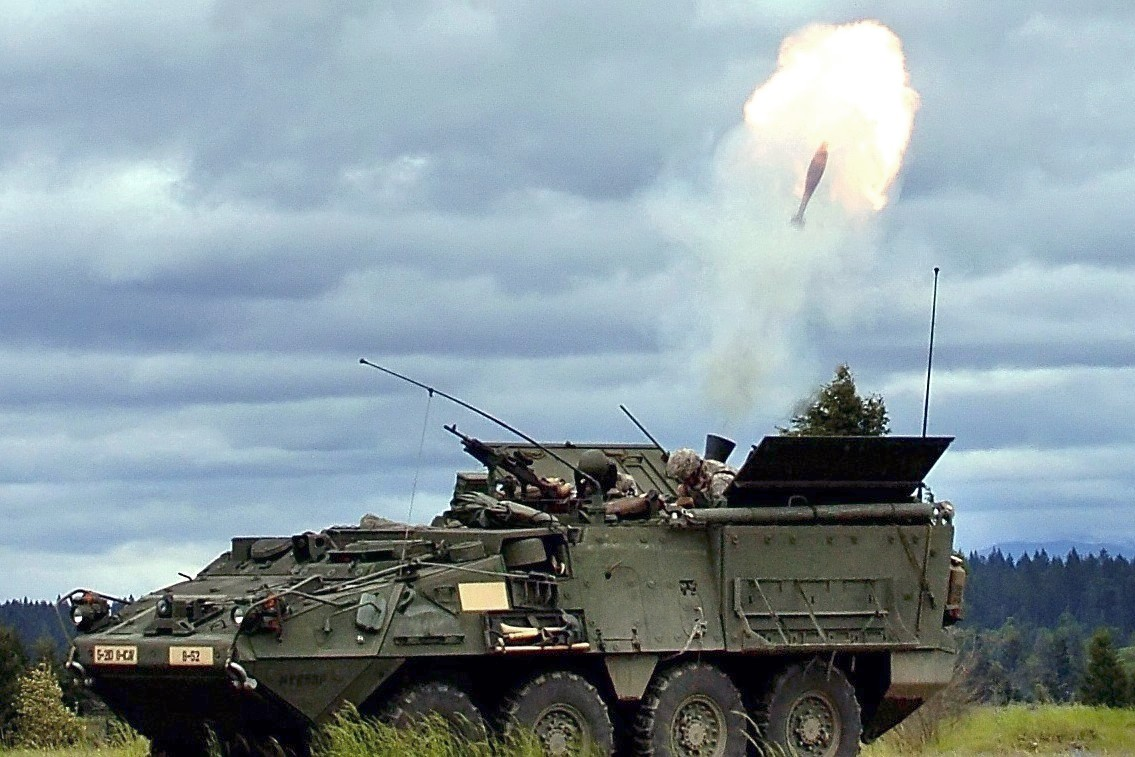
An American M1129 mortar carrier

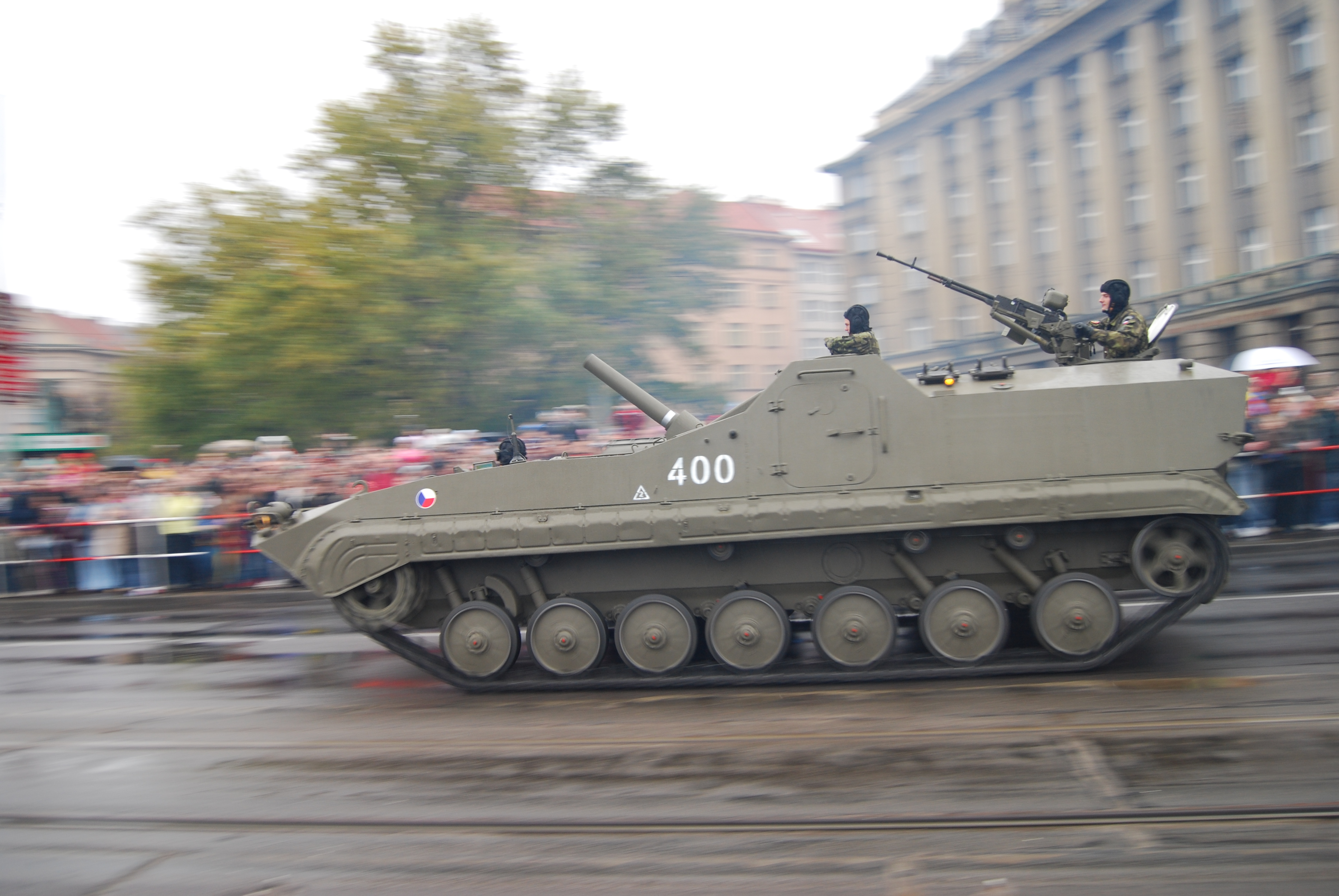
Czechoslovak self-propelled automatic mortar ShM vz.85 PRÁM-S produced by Konštrukta in Trenčín (Slovakia)

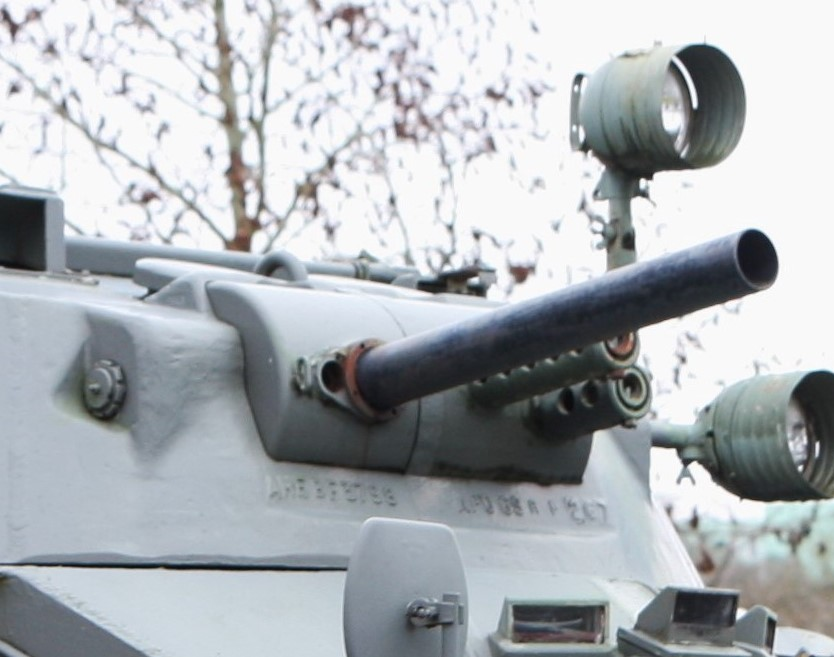
Brandt Mle CM60A1 gun-mortar in the turret of a Panhard AML-60

A mortar carrier, or self-propelled mortar, is a self-propelled artillery piece in which a mortar is the primary weapon. Simpler vehicles carry a standard infantry mortar while in more complex vehicles the mortar is fully integrated into the vehicle and cannot be dismounted from the vehicle. Mortar carriers cannot be fired while on the move and some must be dismounted to fire.

== Evolution ==
The mortar carrier has its genesis in the general mechanisation and motorisation of infantry in the years leading up to World War II. To move an infantry mortar and its crew various methods were developed, for example mounting the mortar on a wheeled carriage for towing behind a light vehicle, attaching the mortar and its permanently fixed baseplate to the rear of a vehicle — the entire assembly hinging from the horizontal for travel and to the vertical to fire, simply transporting the disassembled mortar (tube, baseplate and bipod) its crew and mortar bombs by truck or half-track. Provision to allow the assembled mortar to be fired from inside the vehicle resulted in the most common form of the mortar carrier.

After World War II and the general introduction and acceptance of the armoured personnel carrier (APC) variants of vehicles such as the FV432 and M113 were used as mortar carriers, carrying the mortar itself, its crew and a supply of ammunition. In such vehicles the mortar is positioned to fire out of the roof hatch of the vehicle, a turntable is fixed to the floor of the vehicle beneath the hatch to which the tube and standard bipod of the service infantry mortar can be mounted, the vehicle will also carry the mortar's baseplate (often outside the hull attached to the vehicle sides) to allow the mortar to be used dismounted.

In the battlefield taxi role mortar carriers have traditionally avoided direct contact with the enemy. Many units report never using secondary weapons in combat.

Some light armoured fighting vehicles, such the Panhard AML-60 and Ratel-60, use gun-mortars such as the Brandt Mle CM60A1 — which can be fired on a flat trajectory. This combination allowed a light vehicle to engage targets both directly and indirectly.

In addition to traditional infantry mortars, the Soviet Union introduced into service the 2B9 Vasilek, a gun-mortar capable of direct and indirect fire that was automatically fed. To fit in with their tactical doctrine and in order to allow the Vasilek to use its direct fire capabilities, the Soviet Union produced a mortar carrier in which the mortar was mounted, not inside the vehicle, but on top of it. The Soviet 2S9 Nona and its successor the 2S31 Vena are true self-propelled mortars, being tracked turret mounted 120 mm gun-mortars. Attached to light mobile units, such as the Russian Airborne Troops the Nona and Vena, provides Russian commanders with additional mobile direct fire anti-armour and bunker-busting options.

Other self-propelled gun mortars are the Chinese PLL-05 and the Nordic AMOS/NEMO automatic gun-mortars.

== United States ==
In U.S. Army doctrine, mortar carriers are to provide close and immediate indirect fire support for manoeuvre units while allowing for rapid displacement and quick reaction to the tactical situation. The ability to relocate not only allows fire support to be provided where it is needed faster but also allows these units to avoid counter-battery fire. Prior to the Iraq War, American 120 mm mortar platoons reorganised from six M1064 mortar carriers and two M577 fire direction centers (FDCs) to four M1064 and one FDC. The urban environment of Iraq made it difficult to use mortars. New technologies such as mortar ballistic computers and communication equipment are being integrated.

== See also ==
- List of mortar carriers
- Ansaldo MIAS
