= Type 60 =

Type 60 may refer to:

- Type 60 armored personnel carrier, a Japanese armored personnel carrier
- Type 60 81 mm self-propelled mortar, a Japanese self-propelled mortar
- Type 60 107 mm self-propelled mortar, a Japanese self-propelled mortar
- Type 60 self-propelled 106 mm recoilless rifle, a Japanese self-propelled recoilless rifle carrier
- Type 60 tracked tractor, a Chinese tracked tractor
- Type 60 122 mm field gun, a Chinese field gun
