= Type 60 81 mm self-propelled mortar =

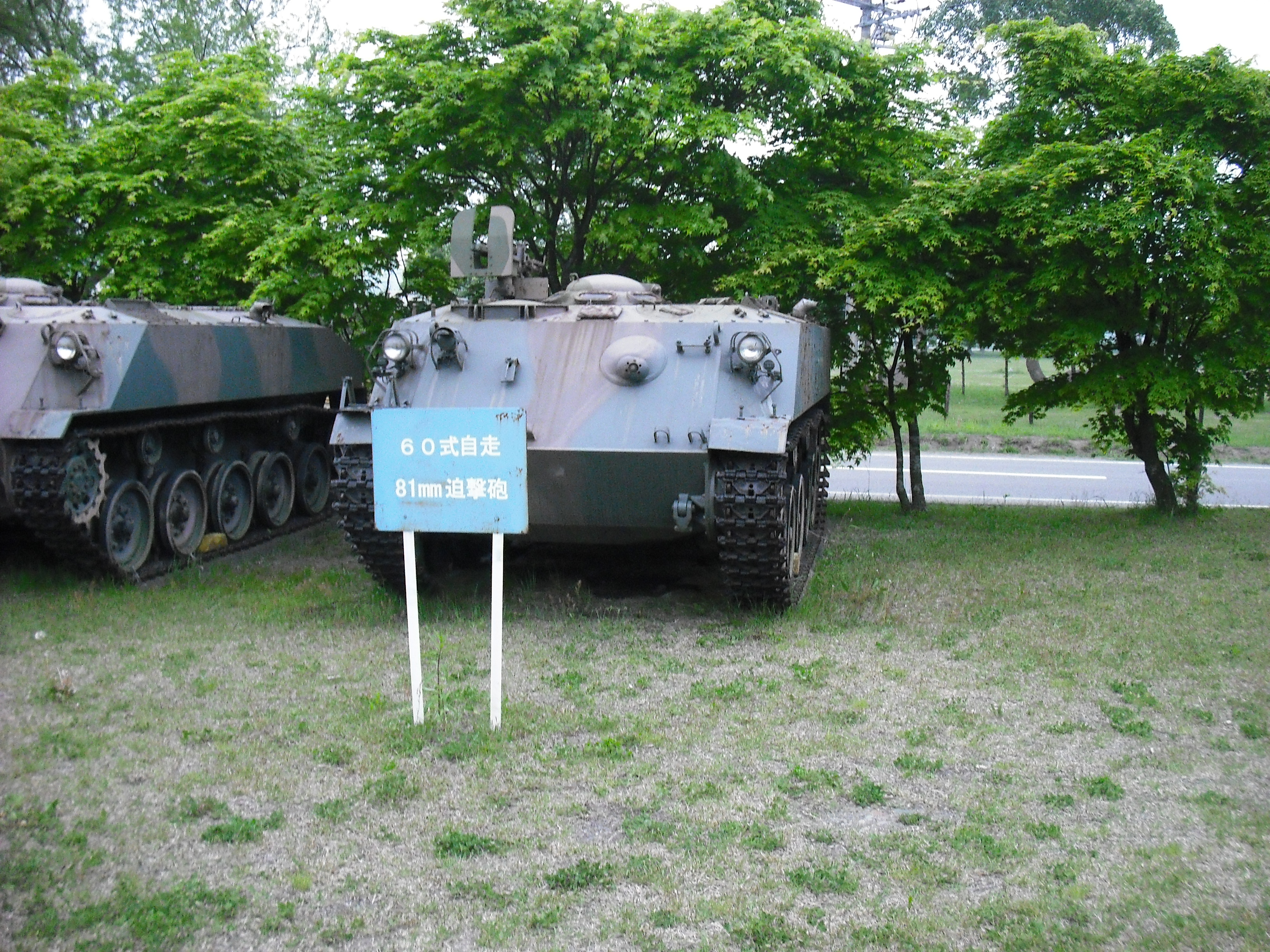
- A Type 60 81 mm self-propelled mortar on display at Camp Higashi-Chitose
- Type: Mortar carrier
- Place of origin: Japan

Service history
- In service: 1960–1998
- Used by: Japan Ground Self-Defense Force (retired)

Production history
- Designed: 1956–1960
- Manufacturer: Mitsubishi Heavy Industries
- Developed from: Type 60 armoured personnel carrier
- Produced: 1960
- No. built: 18

Specifications
- Mass: 12.1 t (13.3 short tons)
- Length: 4.85 m (15.9 ft)
- Width: 2.40 m (7.9 ft)
- Height: 1.70 m (5.6 ft)
- Crew: 5
- Caliber: 81 mm (3.2 in)
- Elevation: +40°…+85°
- Traverse: -40°…+40°
- Rate of fire: 18 rpm
- Muzzle velocity: 210 m/s (690 ft/s)
- Maximum firing range: 3,000 m (9,800 ft)
- Armor: Rolled homogeneous armour
- Main armament: 81 mm Type 60 mortar
- Secondary armament: 12.7 mm M2HB heavy machine gun
- Engine: Mitsubishi 8HA21WT 4-stroke V8 air-cooled turbocharged diesel 220 hp (160 kW) (2,400 rpm)
- Power/weight: 18.18 hp/t (13.56 kW/t)
- Transmission: Manual
- Suspension: Torsion bar
- Ground clearance: 0.4 m (1 ft 4 in)
- Operational range: 230 km (140 mi)
- Maximum speed: 43 km/h (27 mph)

The Type 60 81 mm self-propelled mortar (60式自走81mm迫撃砲, roku-maru-shiki-jisou-81mm-hakugeki-hou) was a Japanese tracked mortar carrier. The vehicle was developed from the Type 60 armoured personnel carrier in parallel with the Type 60 107 mm self-propelled mortar. The mortar carrier entered service with the Japan Ground Self-Defense Force in 1960 and the Type 60 81 mm self-propelled mortar was retired from service by 1998 without replacement.

== Development ==
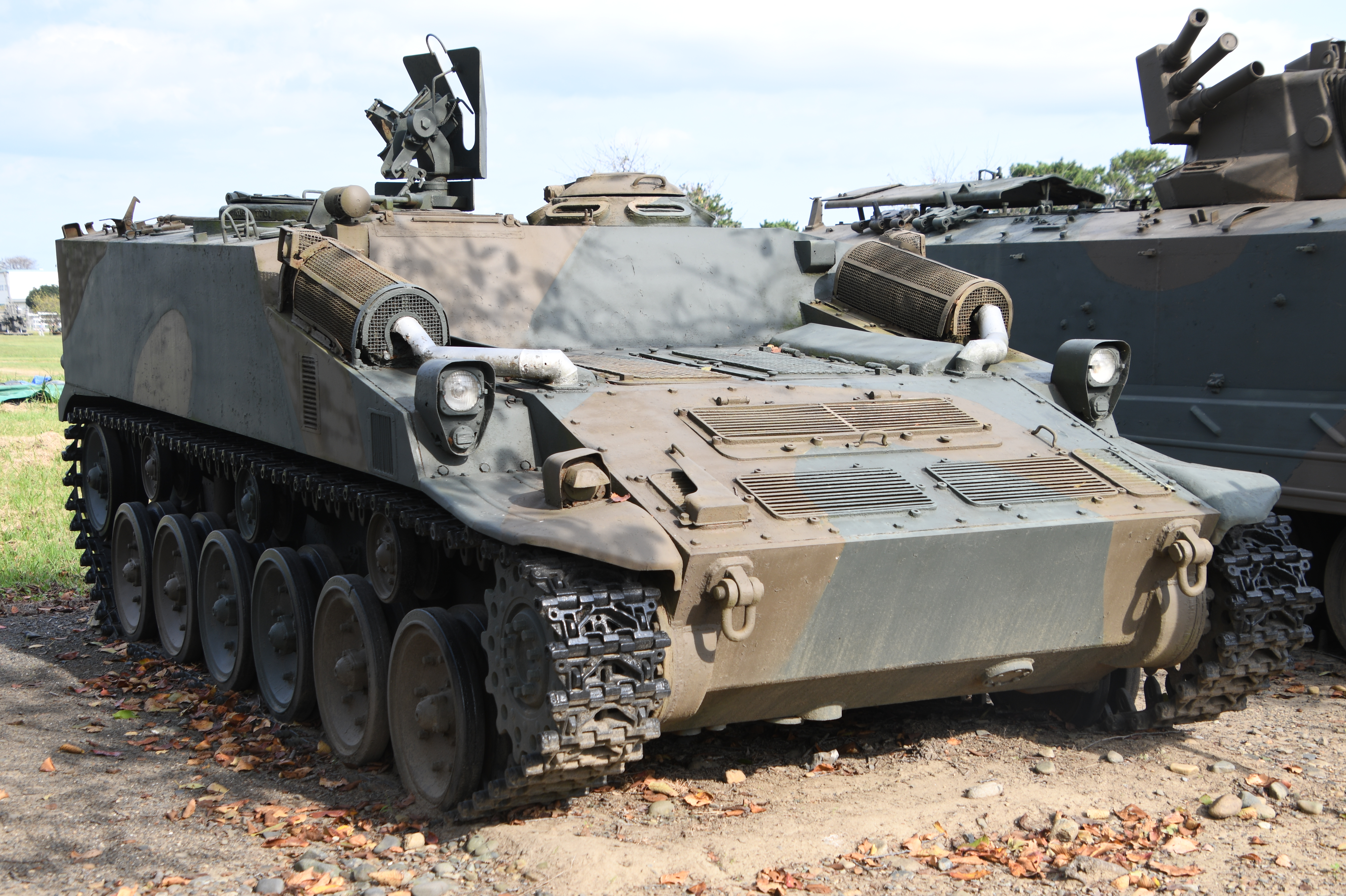
Komatsu's initial SV prototype, which used the firm's SU-I chassis.

In 1956, the Defence Agency issued a request to Komatsu and Mitsubishi Heavy Industries to develop an armoured personnel carrier for the Japan Ground Self-Defense Force. The development efforts focused on a family of three vehicles, which would share their chassis – an armoured personnel carrier (SU), an 81 mm self-propelled mortar (SV), and a 107 mm self-propelled mortar (SX). In 1957, Komatsu and Mitsubishi each completed a prototype armoured personnel carrier, which were designated SU-I and SU-II respectively.

Komatsu developed the initial SV prototype, which used the firm's SU-I chassis. Compared to the armoured personnel carrier version, the self-propelled mortar had a modified troop compartment. Modifications implemented to facilitate the 81 mm mortar included removing seats, installing a large roof hatch, and fitting a recoil absorption mechanism.

In 1959, Mitsubishi completed its improved SU-II prototype. As Mitsubishi's offering was chosen for service, an improved SV prototype with Mitsubishi's SU-II chassis was produced. The recoil absorption mechanism from the initial SV prototype was omitted to improve commonality between the family of vehicles.

The improved SV prototype using Mitsubishi's SU-II chassis was standardised in 1960 as the Type 60 81 mm self-propelled mortar. Although the vehicle had high mobility and protection against bullets and fragments for the crew, it saw limited adoption by the Japan Ground Self-Defense Force due to comparatively high procurement and operating costs. As the Type 96 120 mm self-propelled mortar started to enter service after 1996, the contemporary Type 60 107 mm self-propelled mortar and Type 60 81 mm self-propelled mortar were retired, the latter without replacement.

== Design ==
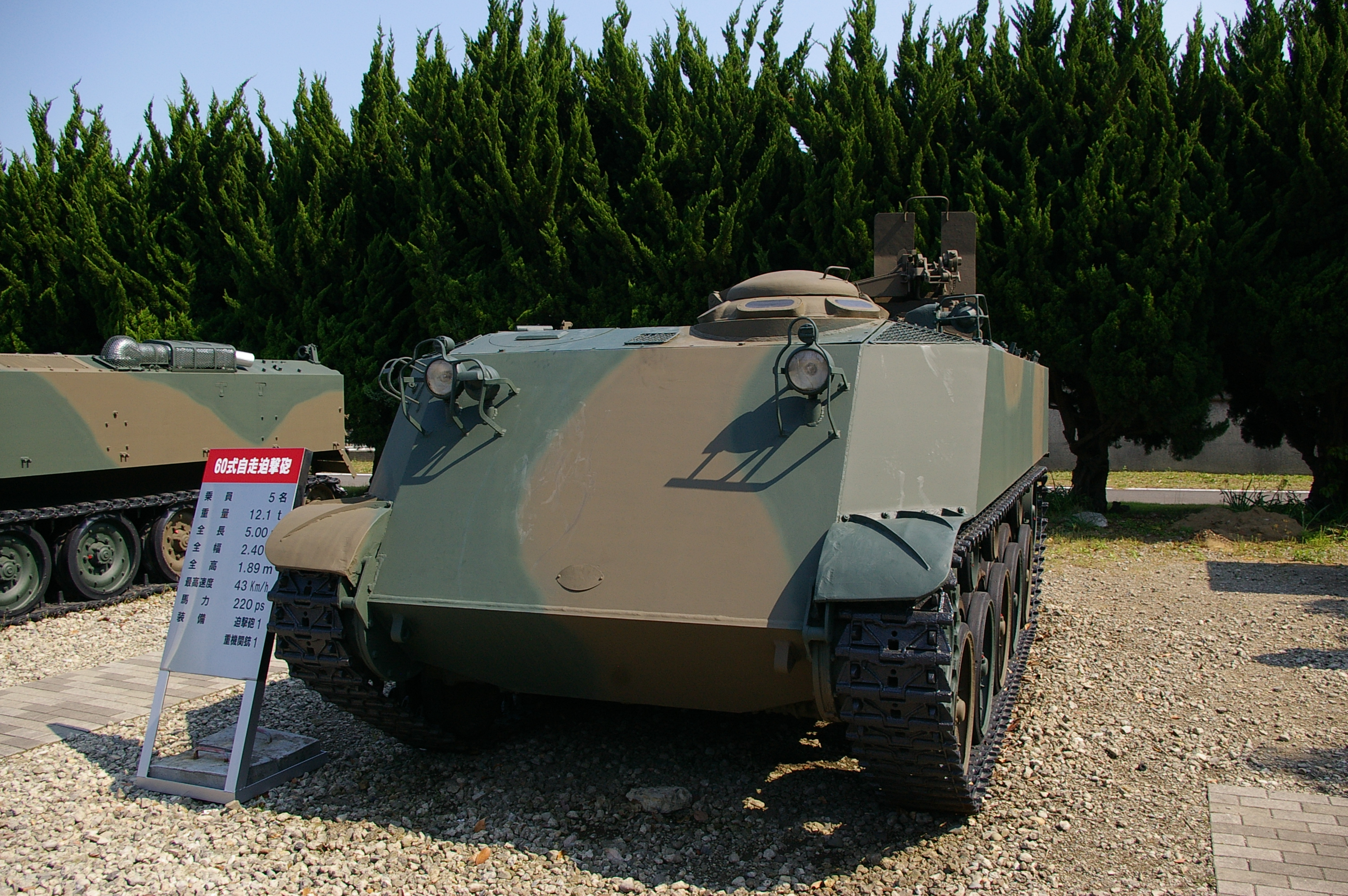
An SV prototype using Mitsubishi's improved SU-II chassis without a mount for a bow machine gun, which was added for production vehicles.

The Type 60 81 mm self-propelled mortar was very similar in configuration to the Type 60 armoured personnel carrier. Both had a hull welded from rolled homogeneous armour, a 220 hp (160 kW) Mitsubishi 8HA21WT four-stroke V8 air-cooled diesel engine in the middle section, as well as tracks with five road wheels, a front drive wheel, and a rear idler wheel. Neither vehicle had night vision or nuclear, biological, and chemical protection equipment.

Where the two vehicles diverged was the rear of the vehicle, where the Type 60 81 mm self-propelled mortar had mounting equipment for a mortar and ammunition racks instead of the troop compartment in the Type 60 armoured personnel carrier. While the mortar carrier was externally very similar to the armoured personnel carrier, it could be differentiated by mounting points for the mortar's base plate and bipod on the glacis plate of the vehicle.

The primary armament of the vehicle was an 81 mortar with 100 rounds of ammunition. It featured an M1 mortar with modifications for fitting in the vehicle, due to which the weapon was designated Type 60 81 mm vehicle-mounted mortar in the Japan Ground Self-Defense Force. The mortar could be fired rearwards from inside the vehicle or from outside the vehicle by using the base plate and bipod mounted on the front of the mortar carrier. The Type 60 81 mm self-propelled mortar was also equipped with a 12.7 mm M2HB heavy machine gun with 420 rounds for self-defence. As the mortar carrier retained the bow machine gun mount from on the armoured personnel carrier version, a 7.62 mm M1919A4 machine gun could be fitted if necessary.

== Similar vehicles ==
- AMX-VCPM de 81 – (France)
- FV432 81 mm mortar carrier – (United Kingdom)
- M125 – (United States)
- Type YW304 – (China)

== See also ==
- List of historic, retired or reserve equipment of the Japan Ground Self-Defense Force
- List of mortar carriers
