= Type 60 107 mm self-propelled mortar =

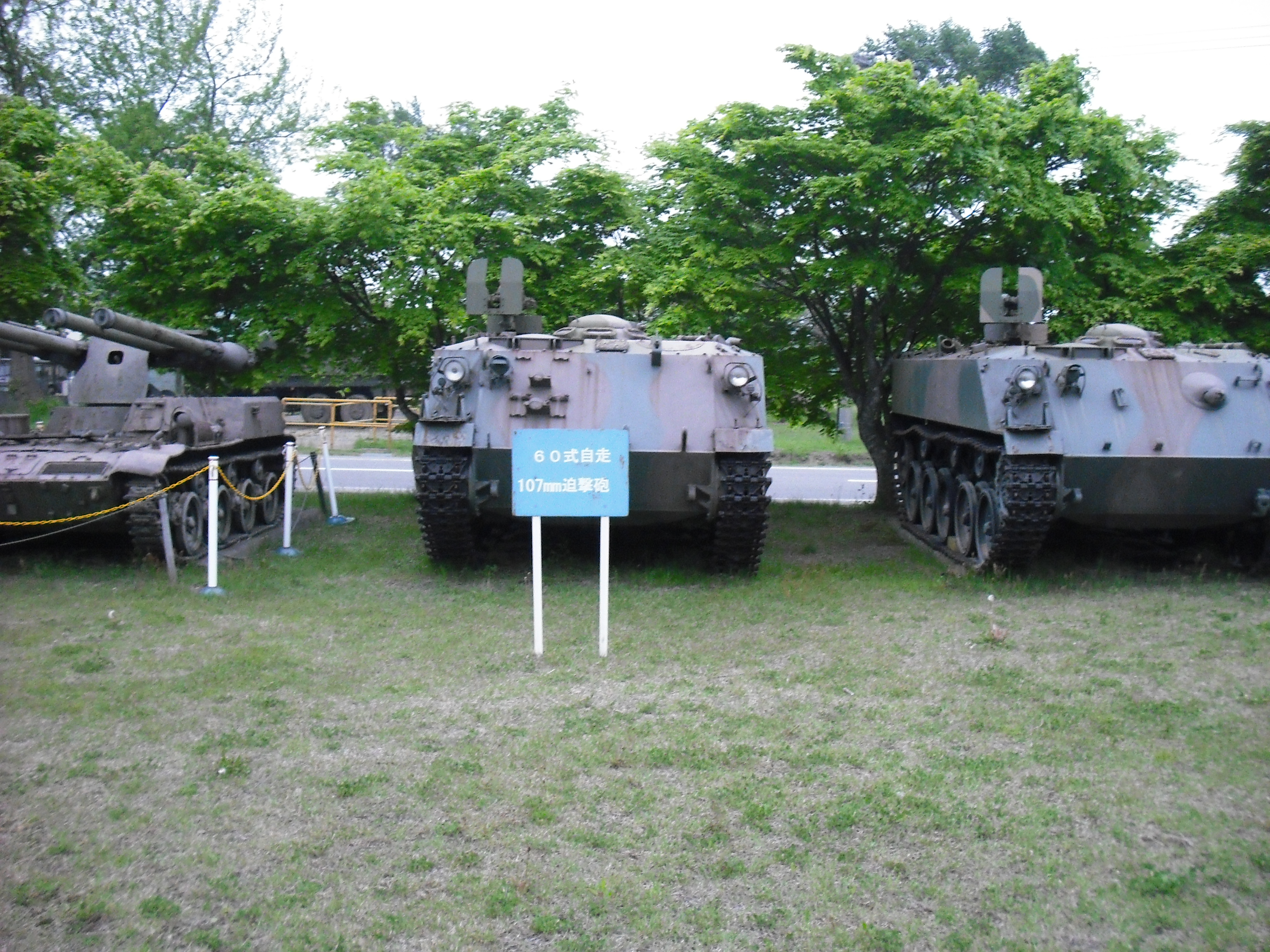
- A Type 60 107 mm self-propelled mortar on display at Camp Higashi-Chitose
- Type: Mortar carrier
- Place of origin: Japan

Service history
- In service: 1960–1998
- Used by: Japan Ground Self-Defense Force (retired)

Production history
- Designed: 1956–1960
- Manufacturer: Mitsubishi Heavy Industries
- Developed from: Type 60 armoured personnel carrier
- Produced: 1960
- No. built: 18

Specifications
- Mass: 12.9 t (12.7 long tons; 14.2 short tons)
- Length: 4.85 m (15.9 ft)
- Width: 2.40 m (7 ft 10 in)
- Height: 1.70 m (5 ft 7 in)
- Crew: 5
- Caliber: 107 mm (4.2 in)
- Maximum firing range: 4,000 m (13,000 ft)
- Armor: Rolled homogeneous armour
- Main armament: 107 mm Type 60 mortar
- Secondary armament: 12.7 mm M2HB heavy machine gun
- Engine: Mitsubishi 8HA21WT 4-stroke V8 air-cooled turbocharged diesel 220 hp (160 kW)
- Power/weight: 17.05 hp/t (12.71 kW/t)
- Suspension: Torsion bar
- Ground clearance: 0.4 m (1 ft 4 in)
- Operational range: 230 km (140 mi)
- Maximum speed: 41 km/h (25 mph)

The Type 60 107 mm self-propelled mortar (60式自走107mm迫撃砲, roku-maru-shiki-jisou-107mm-hakugeki-hou) was a Japanese tracked mortar carrier. The vehicle was developed from the Type 60 armoured personnel carrier in parallel with the Type 60 81 mm self-propelled mortar. The mortar carrier entered service with the Japan Ground Self-Defense Force in 1960 and the Type 60 107 mm self-propelled mortar was retired from service in 1998 after being superseded by the Type 96 120 mm self-propelled mortar.

== Development ==
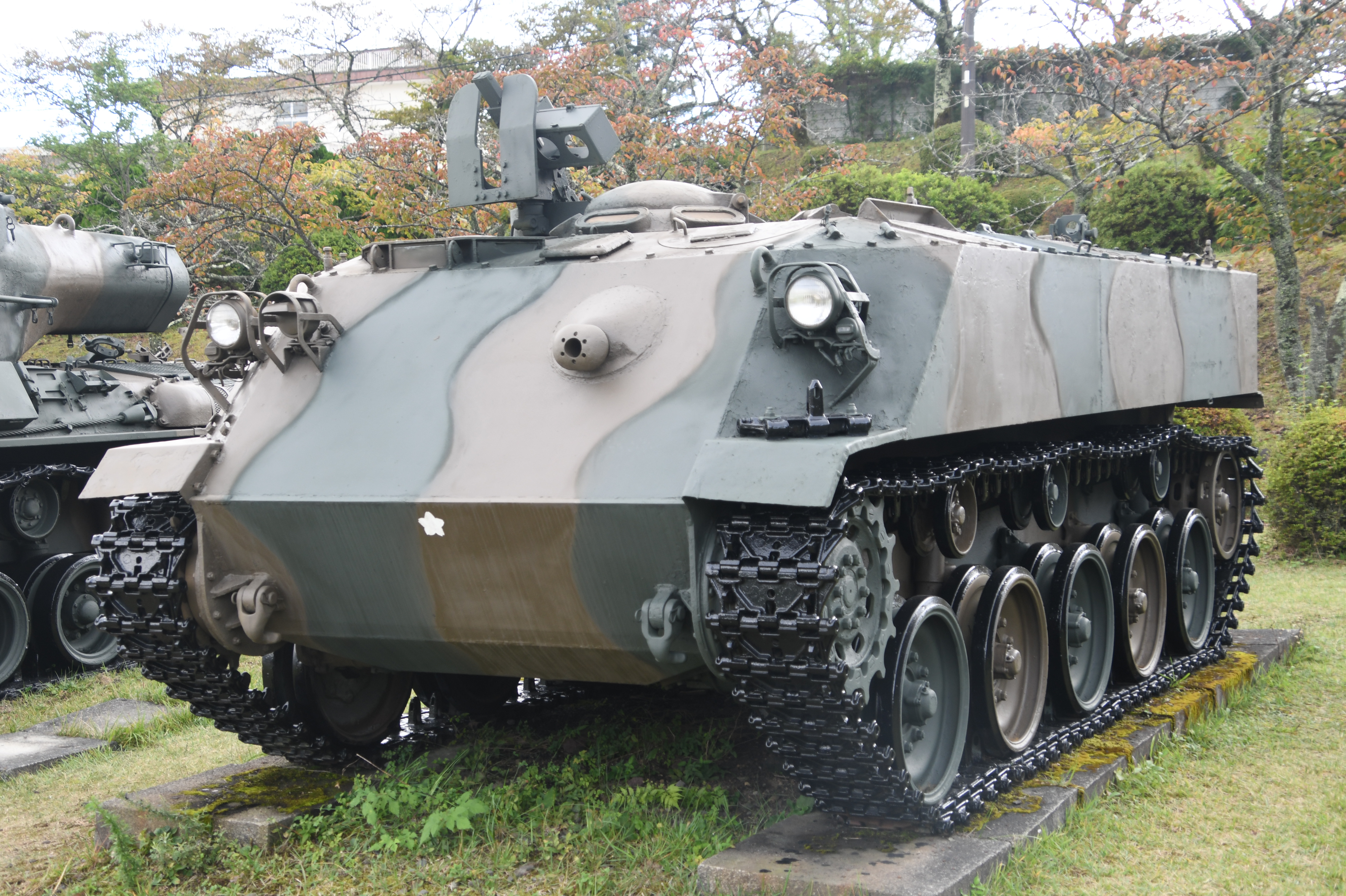
The Type 60 armoured personnel carrier chassis served as the basis for the Type 60 107 mm self-propelled mortar.

In 1956, the Defence Agency requested Komatsu and Mitsubishi Heavy Industries to develop an armoured personnel carrier for the Japan Ground Self-Defense Force. Stemming from the armoured personnel carrier prototypes (SU-I and SU-II), mortar carriers using the chassis were developed – an 81 mm self-propelled mortar (SV) and a 107 mm self-propelled mortar (SX). In 1957, Komatsu and Mitsubishi each completed a prototype armoured personnel carrier, which were designated SU-I and SU-II respectively.

Mitsubishi developed the SX prototype, which utilised the firm's SU-II chassis. Compared to the armoured personnel carrier version, the self-propelled mortar had a modified troop compartment. Modifications to facilitate the 107 mm mortar included removing seats and installing a large multi-part roof hatch.

In 1959, Mitsubishi completed its improved SU-II prototype. Accordingly, a new SX prototype was produced, which featured major changes to the rear of the chassis. Instead of a rear double door that opened to sides was a single downward opening rear hatch. The rear section of the roof was sloped and the 107 mm mortar could now be fired from within the vehicle.

The improved SX prototype was standardised in 1960 as the Type 60 107 mm self-propelled mortar. It saw limited adoption by the Japan Ground Self-Defense Force by units of the 7th Division due to comparatively high procurement and operating costs. The vehicle was superseded by the Type 96 120 mm self-propelled mortar from 1996 onwards and last Type 60 107 mm self-propelled mortars were retired in 1998.

== Design ==
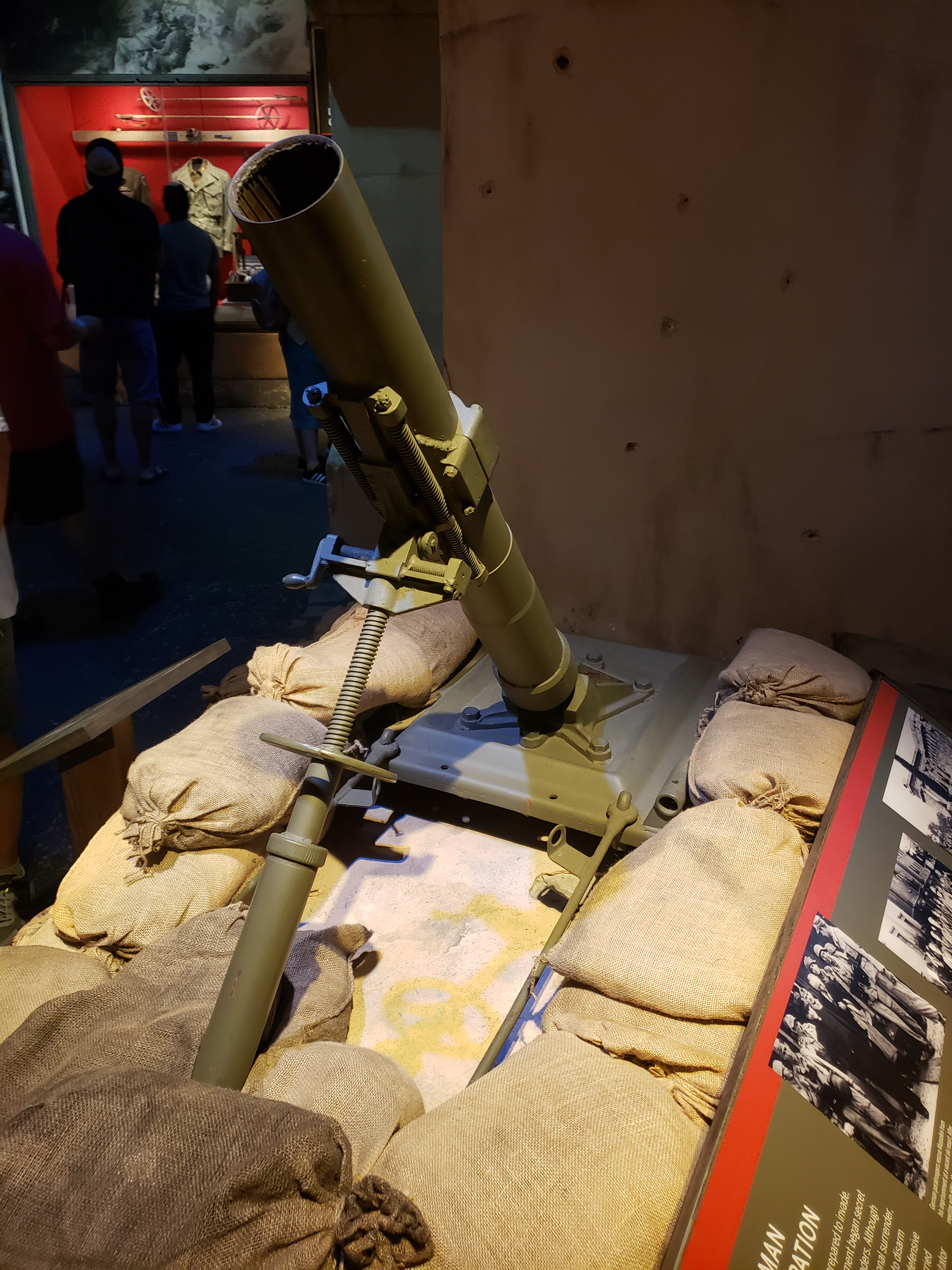
After modifications for fitting in the vehicle, that version of the M2 mortar was designated Type 60 107 mm vehicle-mounted mortar in the Japan Ground Self-Defense Force service.

The Type 60 107 mm self-propelled mortar was similar in configuration to the Type 60 armoured personnel carrier. Both had a hull welded from rolled homogeneous armour, a 220 hp (160 kW) Mitsubishi 8HA21WT four-stroke V8 air-cooled diesel engine in the middle section, as well as tracks with five road wheels, a front drive wheel, and a rear idler wheel. Neither vehicle had night vision or nuclear, biological, and chemical protection equipment.

The rear section of the mortar carrier was significantly modified compared to the Type 60 armoured personnel carrier and the Type 60 81 mm self-propelled mortar. Similarly to the 81 mm mortar carrier, the Type 60 107 mm self-propelled mortar had mounting equipment for a mortar and ammunition racks instead of the troop compartment in the Type 60 armoured personnel carrier. Unlike the armoured personnel carrier and the 81 mm mortar carrier, the 107 mm mortar carrier had a downward sloping rear roof and sides, so it could be easily distinguished from the rest of the vehicles. From the front, Type 60 107 mm self-propelled mortar could be differentiated from the 81 mm mortar carrier by different mounting points for the mortar's base plate and monopod on the glacis plate of the vehicle and the absence of a bow machine gun mount, which was present on Type 60 armoured personnel carrier and the Type 60 81 mm self-propelled mortar.

The primary armament of the vehicle was a 107 mortar with 50 rounds of ammunition. It featured an M2 mortar with modifications for fitting in the vehicle, due to which the weapon was designated Type 60 107 mm vehicle-mounted mortar in the Japan Ground Self-Defense Force. The mortar could be fired rearwards from inside the vehicle or from outside the vehicle by using the base plate and monopod mounted on the front of the mortar carrier. The Type 60 107 mm self-propelled mortar was also equipped with a 12.7 mm M2HB heavy machine gun with 420 rounds for self-defence.

== Similar vehicles ==
- AMX-VCPM de 120 – (France)
- M106 – (United States)
- Type YW381 – (China)

== See also ==
- List of historic, retired or reserve equipment of the Japan Ground Self-Defense Force
- List of mortar carriers
