= Historic, retired or reserve equipment of the Japan Ground Self-Defense Force =

== Small arms ==
Name	Type	Caliber	Origin	Notes	Image
Howa Type 64	Battle rifle	7.62×51mm NATO	Japan	Standard issue until it was replaced by the Howa Type 89 in 1989. It was also used as a sniper rifle, until it was replaced by the M24 in 2002.	
M1 Garand	Battle rifle	.30-06 Springfield	United States	Standard issue until it was replaced by the Type 64 in 1964.	
M1 carbine	Carbine	.30 Carbine	United States	Acquired through the Military Assistance Program.	
M1A1 Thompson	Submachine gun	.45 ACP	United States	Used in the GSDF until the 1970s	
M3 submachine gun	Submachine gun	.45 ACP	United States	Still used in limited numbers by vehicle crews.	
M1903 Springfield	Bolt-action rifle	.30-06 Springfield	United States	Used by the National Police Reserve until its dissolution	
M1918 Browning Automatic Rifle	Light machine gun	.30-06 Springfield	United States	Used by the National Police Reserve until its dissolution	
M1919 Browning machine gun	Medium machine gun	.30-06 Springfield	United States	Used as a mounted weapon until the 1980s	
M2 flamethrower	Flamethrower	Napalm/gasoline tanks	United States	Acquired through the Military Assistance Program	
New Nambu M66	Submachine gun	9×19mm Parabellum		Prototype only	
M1911 pistol	Pistol	.45 ACP	United States	Used by the National Police Reserve until its dissolution	
Colt Detective Special	Revolver	.38 Special	United States	Used by the National Police Reserve until its dissolution	
Mk 2 grenade	Grenade	-	United States	Ex-US Army stock	
M26 grenade	Grenade	-	United States	Ex-US Army stock	
MK3 grenade	Grenade	-	United States	Ex-US Army stock	
M31 HEAT rifle grenade	Rifle grenade	66mm	United States	Used on the Howa Type 64 and M1 Garand.	

== Personal equipment ==
Name	Type	Notes	Image
U.S. Army M1943 uniform	Uniform	Japanese produced variants of 1950 & 1951 patterns	
M-1956 load-carrying equipment	Uniform	Japanese-produced	
All-purpose lightweight individual carrying equipment	Uniform	Japanese-produced	
M1 and M1905E1 bayonets	Bayonet	Japanese-produced	
M4 bayonet	Bayonet	Japanese-produced	
M5 bayonet	Bayonet	Japanese-produced	
C-rations	Rations		
D-rations/tropical bars	Rations		
M-1942 mess kit	Mess kit		
T-10 parachute	Parachute	Produced under licence by Fuji Sangyo Co. Ltd. (Fujikura Parachute)	
G-11 cargo parachute	Parachute	Produced under licence by Fujikura Parachute	
G-12 cargo parachute	Parachute	Produced under licence by Fuji Sangyo Co. Ltd.	

== Artillery and missile systems ==
Name	Type	Caliber	Origin	Image
Mortar
Type 64	Mortar	81mm	Japan	
M2 mortar	Mortar	60mm	United States	
M1 mortar	Mortar	81mm	United States	
M2 mortar	Mortar	107mm	United States	
Howitzer
M1A1 howitzer	Howitzer	75mm	United States	
M2A1 howitzer	Howitzer	105mm	United States	
M2 howitzer	Howitzer	155mm	United States	
M1 howitzer	Howitzer	155mm	United States	
M2 howitzer	Howitzer	203mm	United States	
Anti-aircraft gun
L-90 35mm anti-aircraft twin cannon	Autocannon	35mm	Switzerland	
Bofors 40 mm gun	Autocannon	40mm	Sweden	
M51 75 mm anti-aircraft gun	Anti-aircraft gun	75mm	United States	
M1 90 mm anti-aircraft gun	Anti-aircraft gun	90mm	United States	
Anti-Landing craft and anti-tank missile
Type 64 anti-tank missile	MCLOS wire-guided anti-tank missile	120mm	Japan	
Surface-to-air missile
MIM-3 long-range surface-to-air missile	Surface-to-air missile	370mm	United States	

== Vehicles ==
Name	Type	Origin	Image
Armoured vehicles
Type 74	Main battle tank	Japan	
Type 61	Main battle tank	Japan	
M41 Walker Bulldog	Light tank	United States	
M24 Chaffee	Light tank	United States	
M4 Sherman	Medium tank	United States	
Type 60 armored personnel carrier	Armoured personnel carrier	Japan	
M20	Reconnaissance vehicle	United States	
M8 Greyhound	Reconnaissance vehicle	United States	
Self propelled artillery
Type 60 self-propelled 106 mm recoilless rifle	Tank destroyer	Japan	
Type 60 107 mm Self-propelled mortar	Self propelled mortar	Japan	
Type 60 81 mm Self-propelled mortar	Self propelled mortar	Japan	
Type 74 105 mm Self-propelled howitzer	Self-propelled howitzer	Japan	
M52A1 self-propelled howitzer	Self-propelled howitzer	United States	
M44A1 self-propelled howitzer	Self-propelled howitzer	United States	
Type 75 130 mm multiple surface-to-surface rocket	Multiple rocket launcher	Japan	
Type 67 Model 30 rocket artillery	Multiple rocket launcher	Japan	
M42 40 mm self-propelled anti-aircraft gun	Self-propelled anti-aircraft weapon	United States	
M19 gun motor carriage SPAA	Self-propelled anti-aircraft weapon	United States	
M8 tractor	Artillery tractor	United States	
M5 tractor	Artillery tractor	United States	
M4 tractor	Artillery tractor	United States	
Type 73 artillery support vehicle	Ammunition resupply vehicle	Japan	
Armoured recovery/engineering vehicle
Type 70 armoured recovery vehicle	Armoured recovery vehicle	Japan	
M32 tank recovery vehicle	Armoured recovery vehicle	United States	
Type 67 armoured vehicle-launched bridge	Armoured vehicle-launched bridge	Japan	
Miscellaneous
Mitsubishi Jeep J-series	Off-road vehicle	Japan	
Toyota BQ/FQ10・15/HQ15 series	Truck	Japan	
Dodge WC series	Four-wheel drive truck	United States	
Isuzu TS/TW series	Four-wheel drive truck	Japan	
GMC CCKW	Six-wheel drive truck	United States	
M25 tank transporter	Semi-trailer truck	United States	

== Aircraft ==
Name	Type	Origin	Image
Kawasaki KAQ-1	Target drone	Japan	
Kawasaki KAT-1	Trainer aircraft	Japan	
Beechcraft/Fuji T-34 Mentor (Model B45)	Trainer aircraft	United States	
Fuji LM-1 Nikko	Military communications aircraft	Japan	
Fuji TL-1	Trainer aircraft	Japan	
Mitsubishi (Sikorsky) H-19C	Utility helicopter	United States Built on license	
Kawasaki (Hughes) TH-55J	Utility and trainer helicopter	United States Built on license	
Kawasaki KH-4	Utility helicopter	Japan	
Kawasaki Heavy Industries (Hughes) OH-6	Light Observation Helicopter	United States Built on license	
