= Type 60 armored personnel carrier =

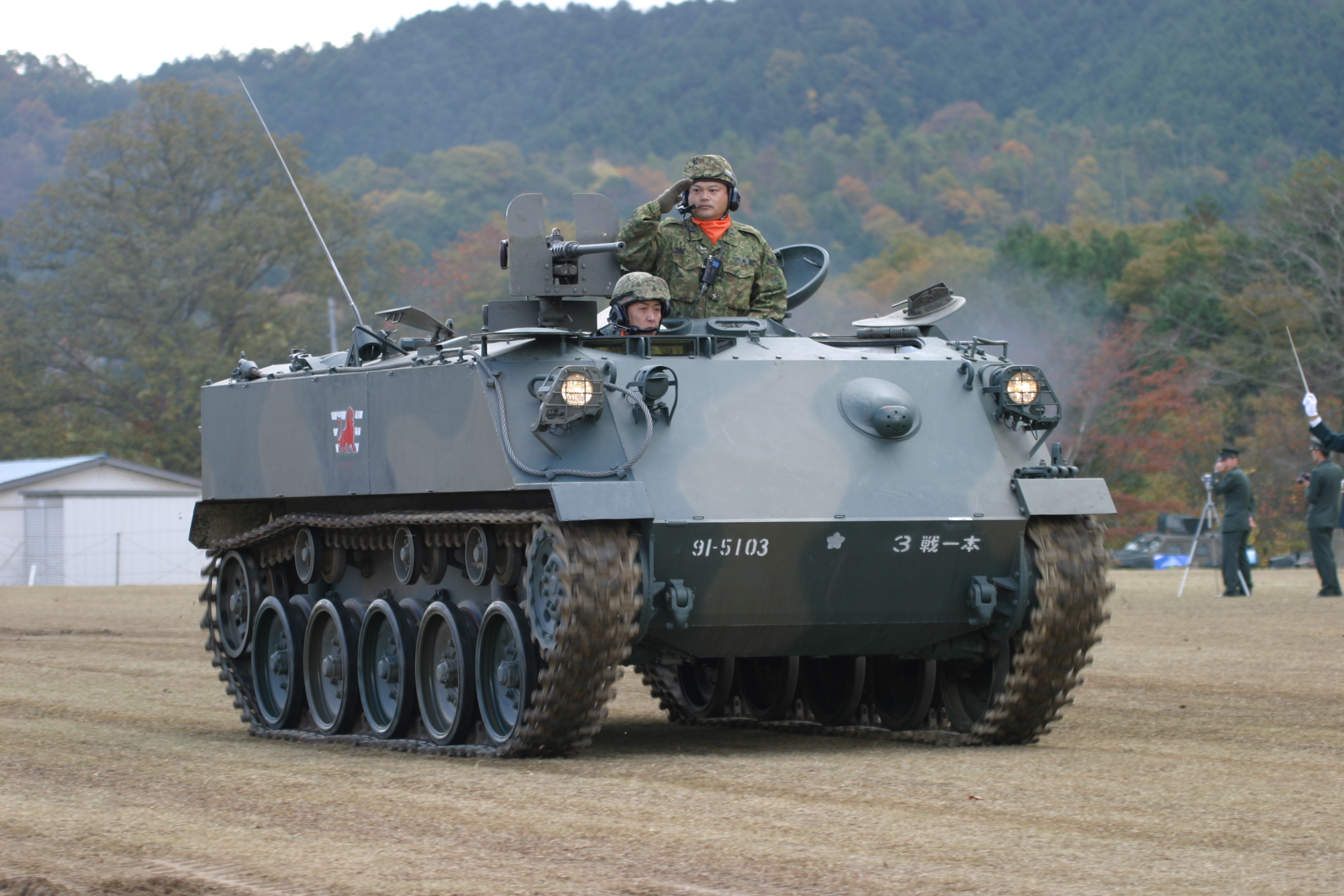
- A Type 60 armored personnel carrier of the Japan Ground Self-Defense Force on parade at Camp Fukuchiyama
- Type: Armored personnel carrier
- Place of origin: Japan

Service history
- In service: 1960–2006
- Used by: Japan Ground Self-Defense Force (retired)

Production history
- Designer: Mitsubishi Heavy Industries
- Designed: 1956–1960
- Manufacturer: Mitsubishi Heavy Industries, Komatsu Limited
- Produced: 1960–1972
- No. built: 428
- Variants: See Variants

Specifications
- Mass: 11.8 t (13.0 short tons) (combat weight); 10.6 t (11.7 short tons) (empty)
- Length: 4.85 m (15.9 ft)
- Width: 2.40 m (7.9 ft)
- Height: 1.70 m (5.6 ft) (without gun shield); 2.31 m (7.6 ft) (with gun shield)
- Crew: 4 (bow gunner, commander, driver, gunner)
- Passengers: 6
- Armor: Rolled homogeneous armor
- Main armament: 12.7 mm M2HB heavy machine gun
- Secondary armament: 7.62 mm M1919A4 bow machine gun
- Engine: Mitsubishi 8HA21WT 4-stroke V8 air-cooled turbocharged diesel 220 hp (160 kW) (2,400 rpm)
- Power/weight: 18.64 hp/t (13.90 kW/t)
- Suspension: Torsion bar
- Ground clearance: 0.4 m (16 in)
- Operational range: 230 km (140 mi)
- Maximum speed: 45 km/h (28 mph) (road)

The Type 60 armored personnel carrier (60式装甲車, roku-maru-shiki-soukou-sha) was a Japanese tracked armored personnel carrier. Produced by Mitsubishi Heavy Industries and Komatsu, the vehicle entered service with the Japan Ground Self-Defense Force in 1960. The Type 73 armored personnel carrier superseded the Type 60 in service, with the last vehicles retired in 2006.

== Development ==
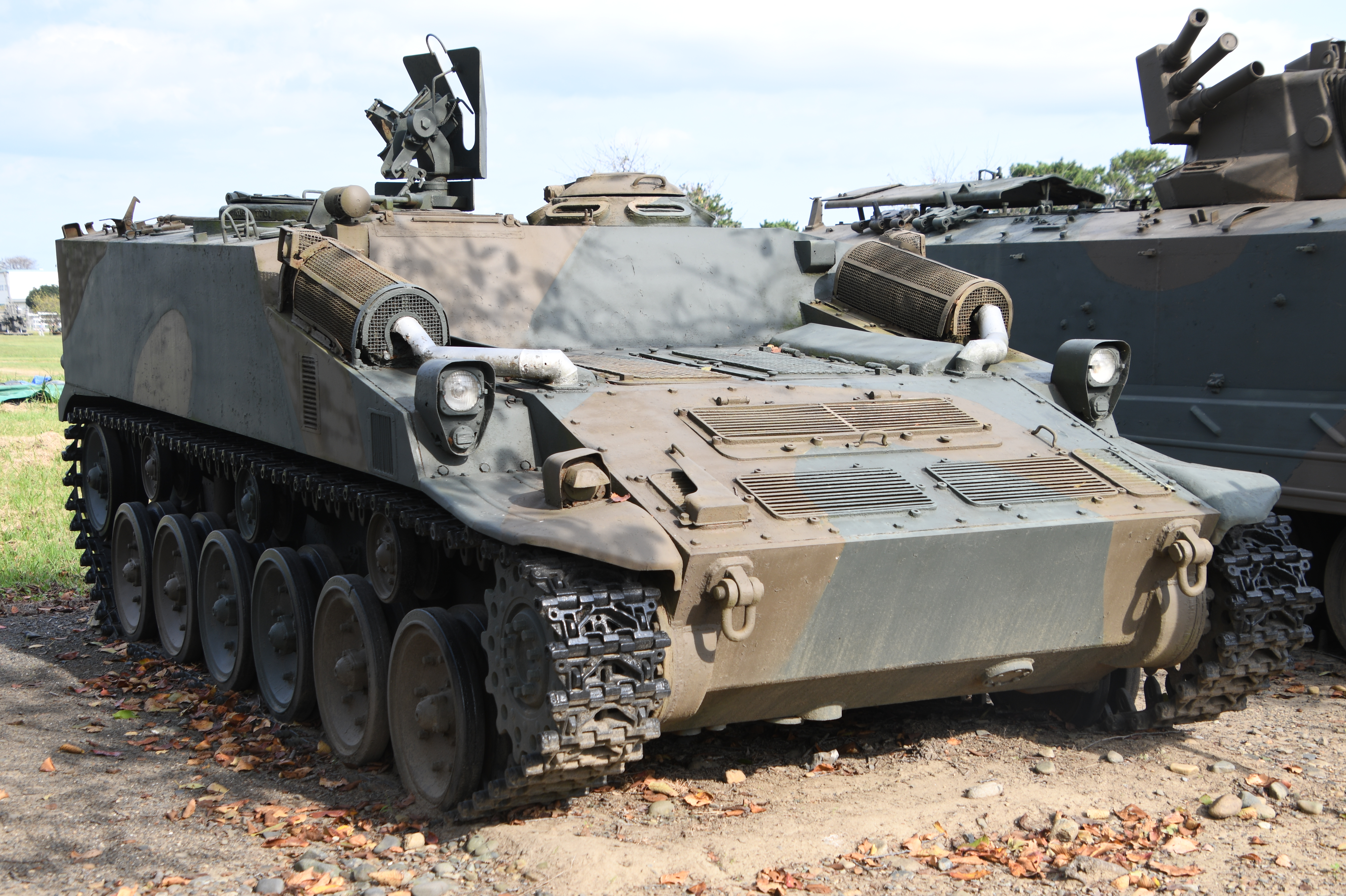
An early Type 60 81 mm self-propelled mortar prototype, which used Komatsu's SU-I prototype chassis.

In 1956, the Defense Agency requested Komatsu and Mitsubishi Heavy Industries to develop a tracked armored personnel carrier for the Japan Ground Self-Defense Force. A year later, each firm had completed a prototype. Komatsu's prototype received the designation SU-I and Mitsubishi's SU-II. The two prototypes were evaluated against the American M59 armored personnel carrier during trials. Initial prototypes were followed by a second series of 11 prototypes, including both personnel as well as 81 mm and 107 mm mortar carrier variants, with a third series of four prototypes being completed and tested in 1959.

In 1959, Mitsubishi presented an improved version of its SU-II prototype. Mitsubishi's offering was further improved and standardised as the Type 60 armored personnel carrier in 1960. Initial production orders were placed in 1959 and series production of the vehicle started in 1960. By the end of production in 1972, 428 units had been built. Production commenced in parallel by Mitsubishi and Komatsu, with the former building 220 and the latter 208 armored personnel carriers.

== Design ==
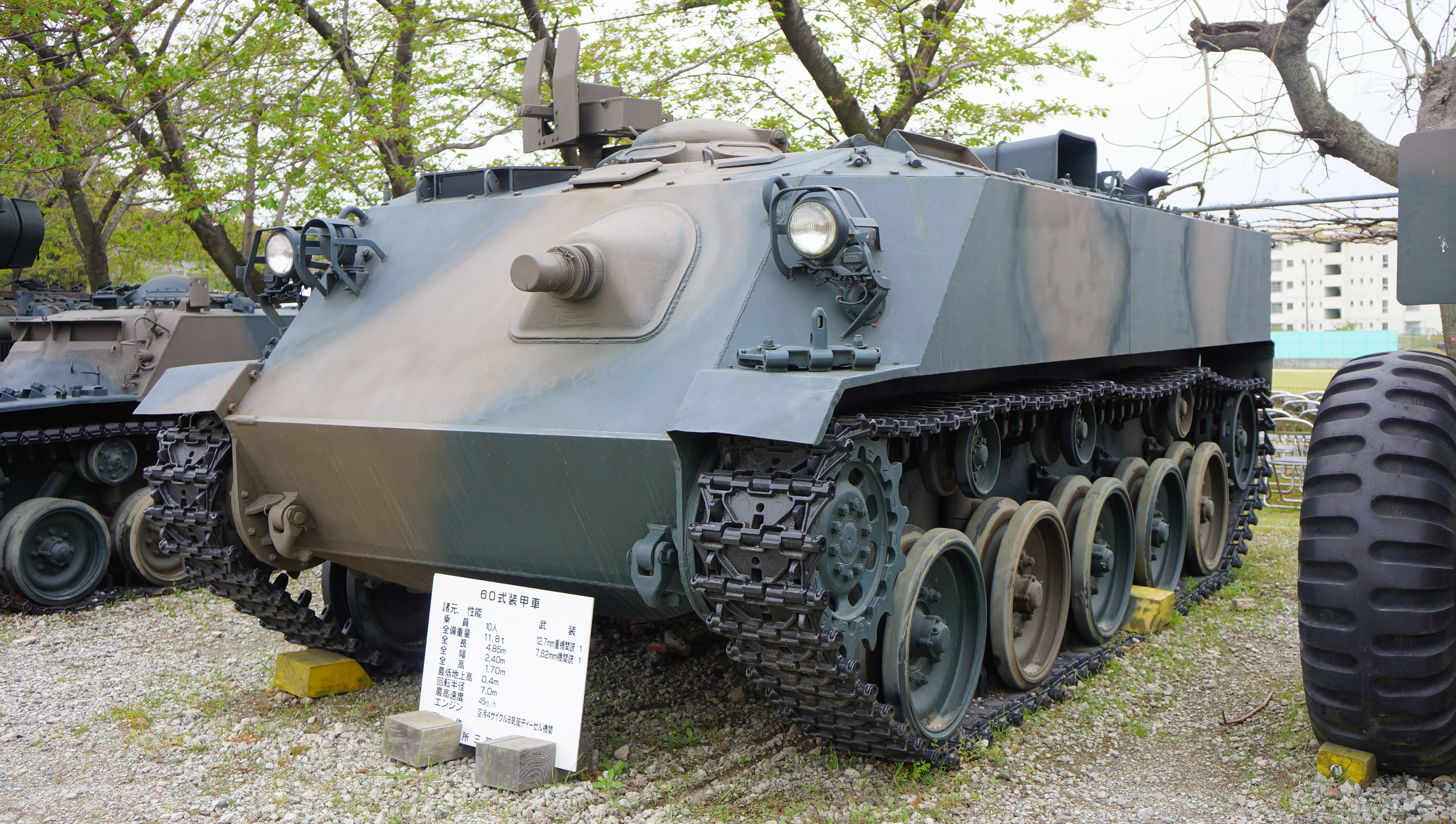
A Type 60 armored personnel carrier with a modified bow machine gun mount to fit the 7.62 mm Type 74 machine gun

The Type 60 had a hull welded from rolled homogeneous armor plates, with a sloped glacis plate as well as vertical hull sides and rear. It was operated by a crew of four (driver, bow gunner, commander, and gunner). The driver sat at the front right of the hull, with the bow gunner, armed with a single 7.62 mm M1919A4 machine gun, sitting to his left. The commander sat behind and between the bow gunner and the driver, while the gunner sat behind and to the right of the commander, operating a 12.7 mm M2HB heavy machine gun mounted on the vehicle's roof. Six troops were carried in a compartment at the rear of the hull, accessed by two doors at the back of the vehicle.

The vehicle was powered by a 220 hp (160 kW) Mitsubishi 8HA21WT four-stroke V8 air-cooled diesel engine mounted behind the bow gunner. Its tracks were fitted with five road wheels, with a drive wheel at the front and an idler wheel at the rear. The Type 60 utilised a torsion bar suspension. No night vision equipment or nuclear, biological, and chemical protection equipment was fitted. The vehicle could ford to a depth of 1 m (3.3 ft), but it was not amphibious.

== Operational history ==
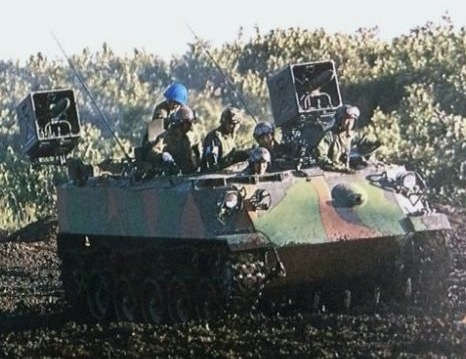
A Type 60 equipped with KAM-3D wire-guided anti-tank missiles

The Type 60 began entering service from 1960, being the first armored personnel carrier adopted by the Japan Ground Self-Defense Force. In addition to regular duties as an armored personnel carrier, the Type 60 was used for more specialised roles. Among those was opposing force training, with several Type 60s being modified to visually resemble the Soviet BMD-1 airborne infantry fighting vehicles.

Developing a replacement for the Type 60 started started in 1967, to address its lack of nuclear, biological, and chemical protection as well as to increase the troop carrying capacity. The resulting Type 73 armored personnel carrier was accepted into service in 1973. From 1974 onwards, the Type 60 was superseded by the Type 73 in Japan Ground Self-Defense Force service. However, only 338 Type 73s were manufactured due to its comparatively high procurement cost and the Type 60 continued in large scale use until the 2000s. By 2005, 33 vehicles remained in service, but none were listed as in service in 2006.

== Variants ==
- The Type 60 armored personnel carrier (prototype designation SU-II) was the basic version of the vehicle. Some were fitted with two KAM-3D wire-guided anti-tank missiles on the rear of the hull.
- The Type 60 81 mm self-propelled mortar (prototype designation SV) was a mortar carrier equipped with a modified version of the 81 mm M1 mortar.
- The Type 60 107 mm self-propelled mortar (prototype designation SX) was a mortar carrier equipped with a modified version of the 107 mm M2 mortar.

== Gallery ==
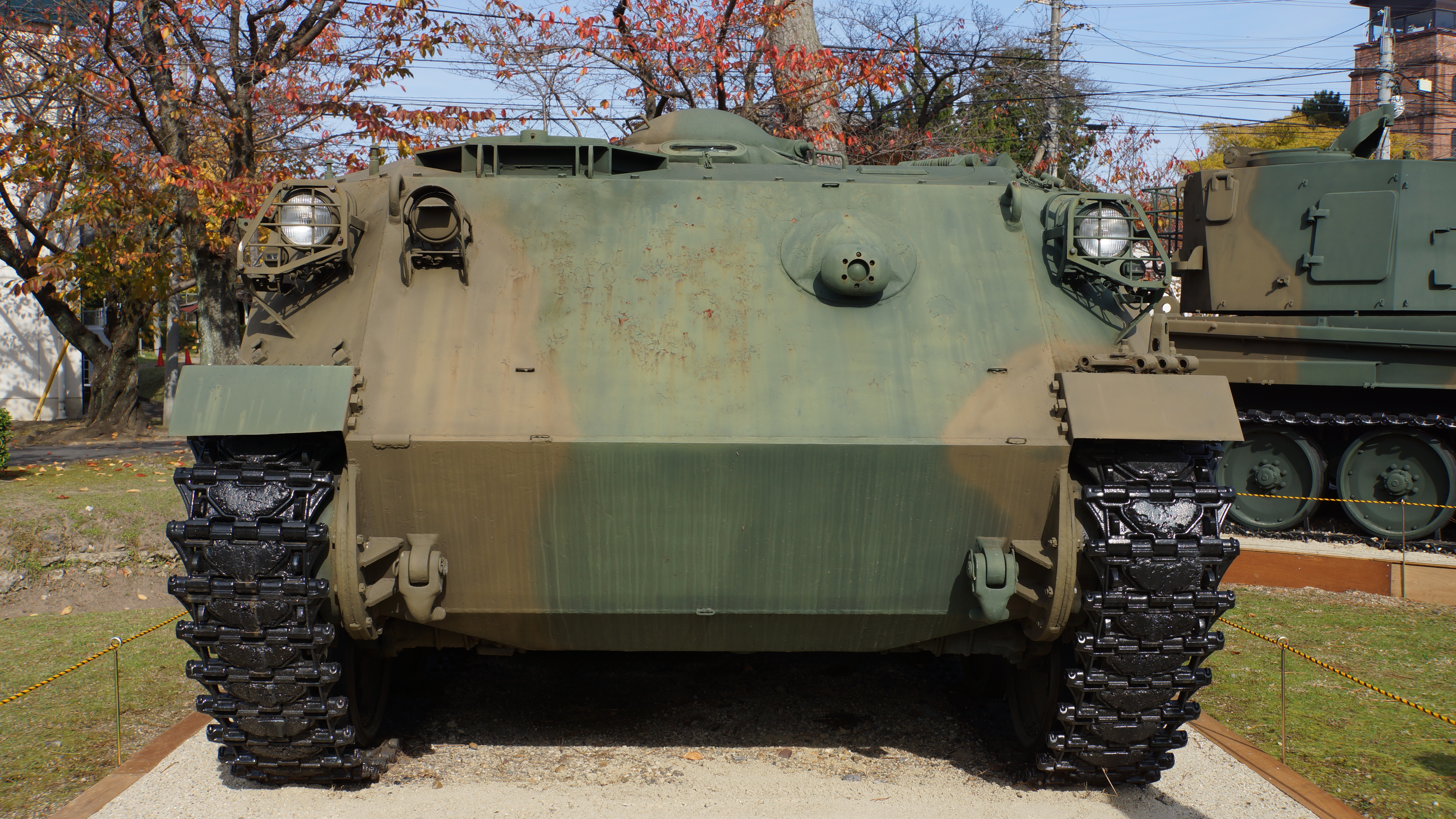
Front view of the Type 60 at Camp Uji

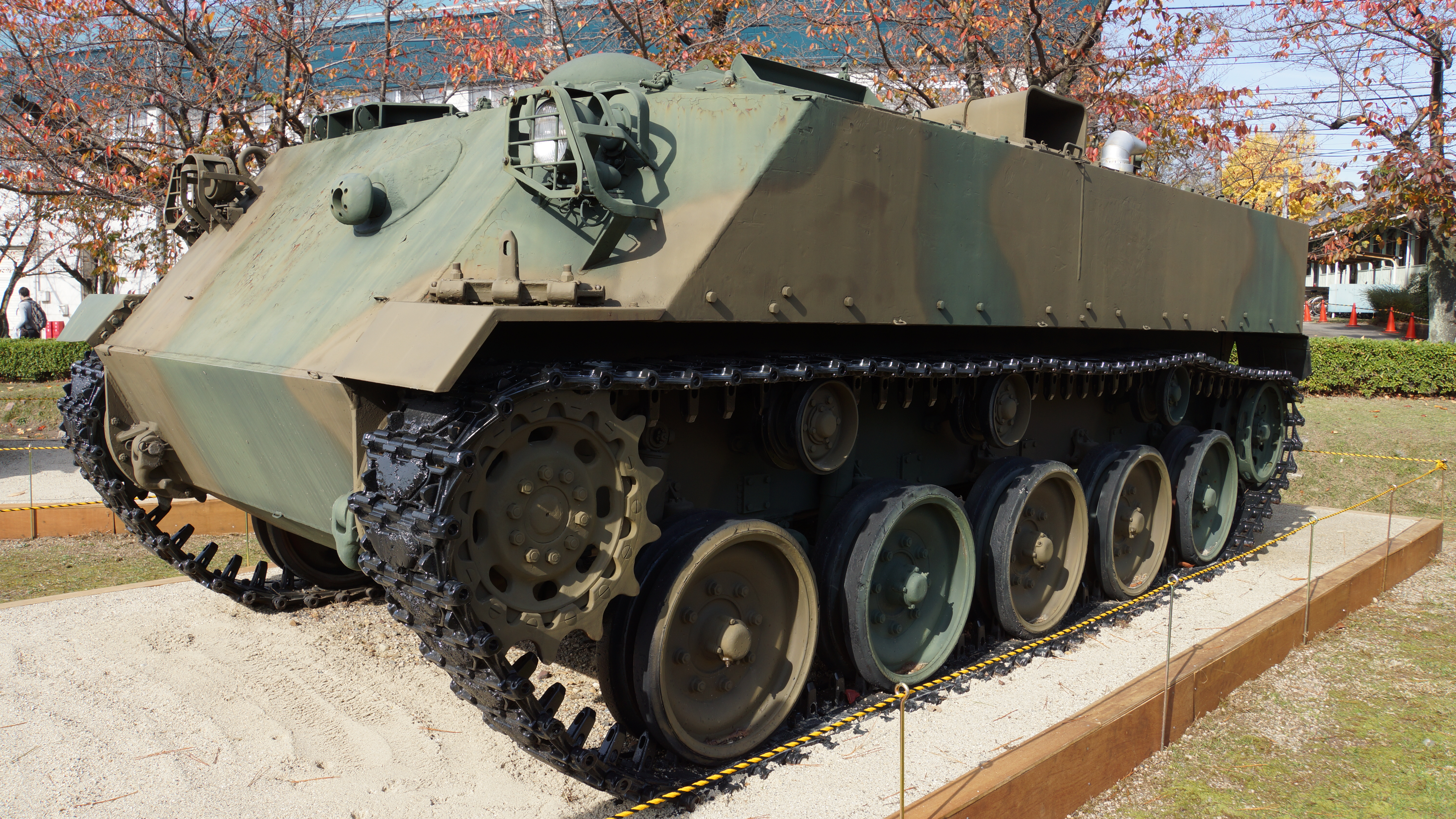
Left front view of the Type 60 at Camp Uji

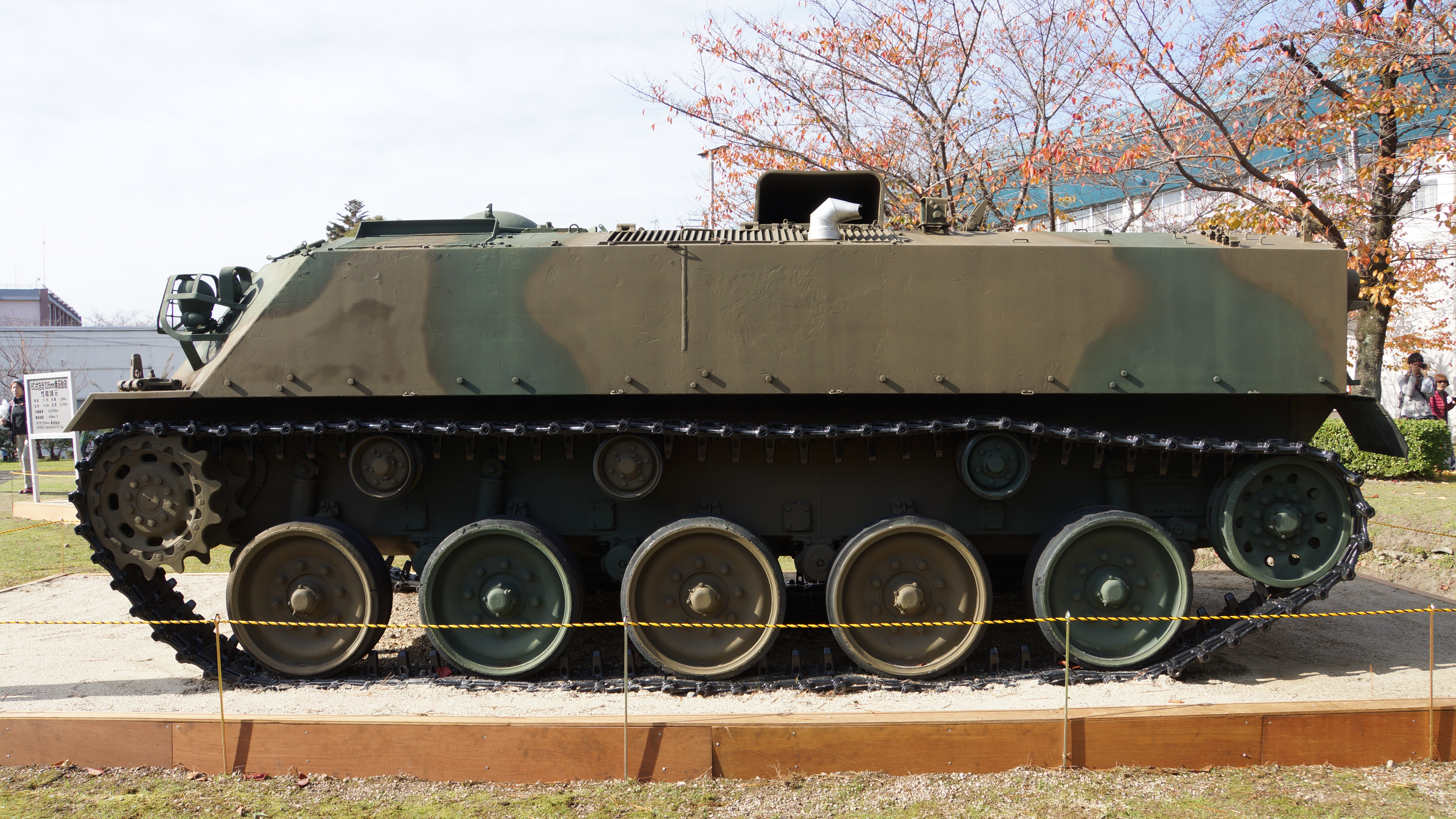
Left side view of the Type 60 at Camp Uji

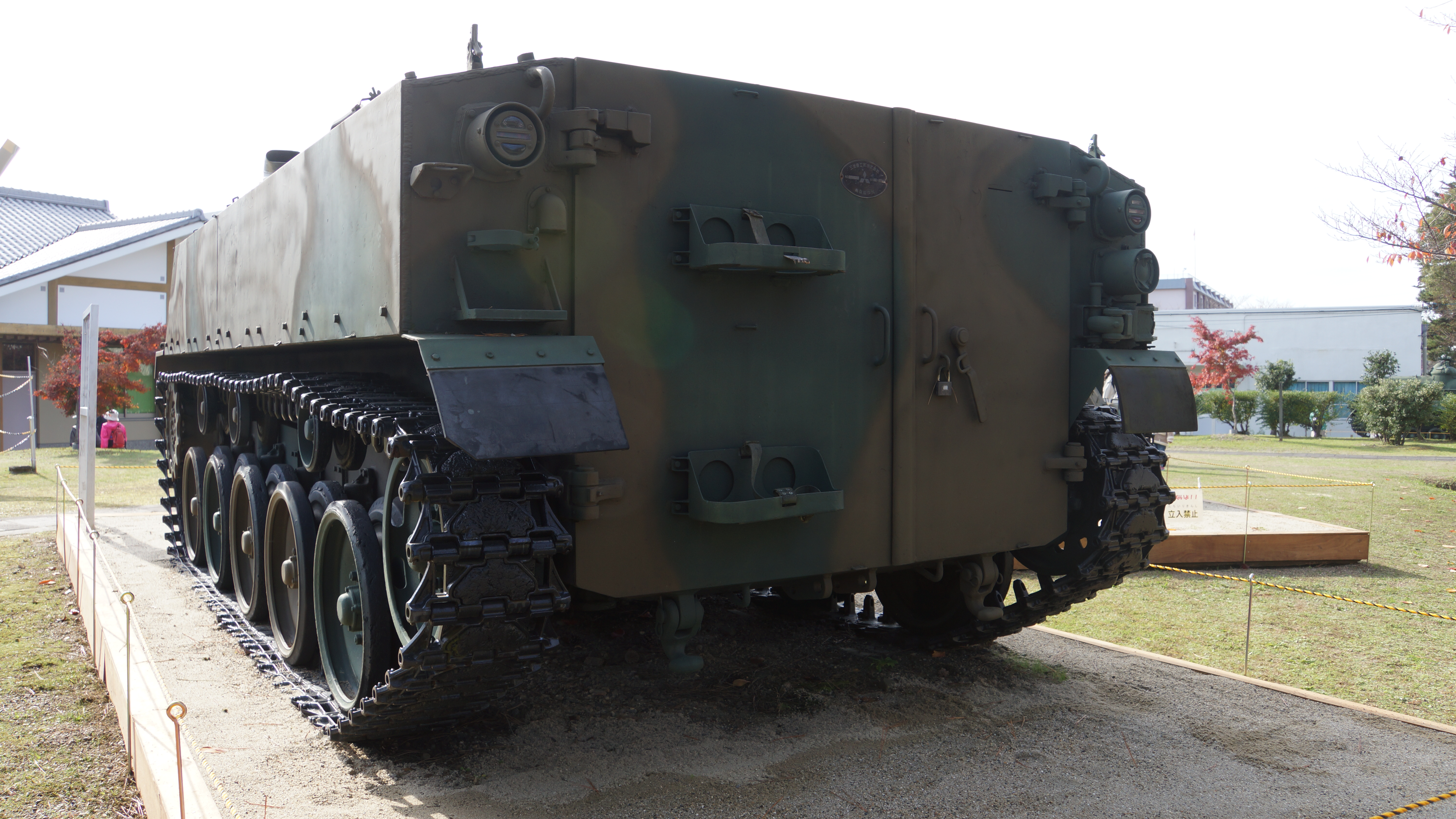
Left rear view of the Type 60 at Camp Uji

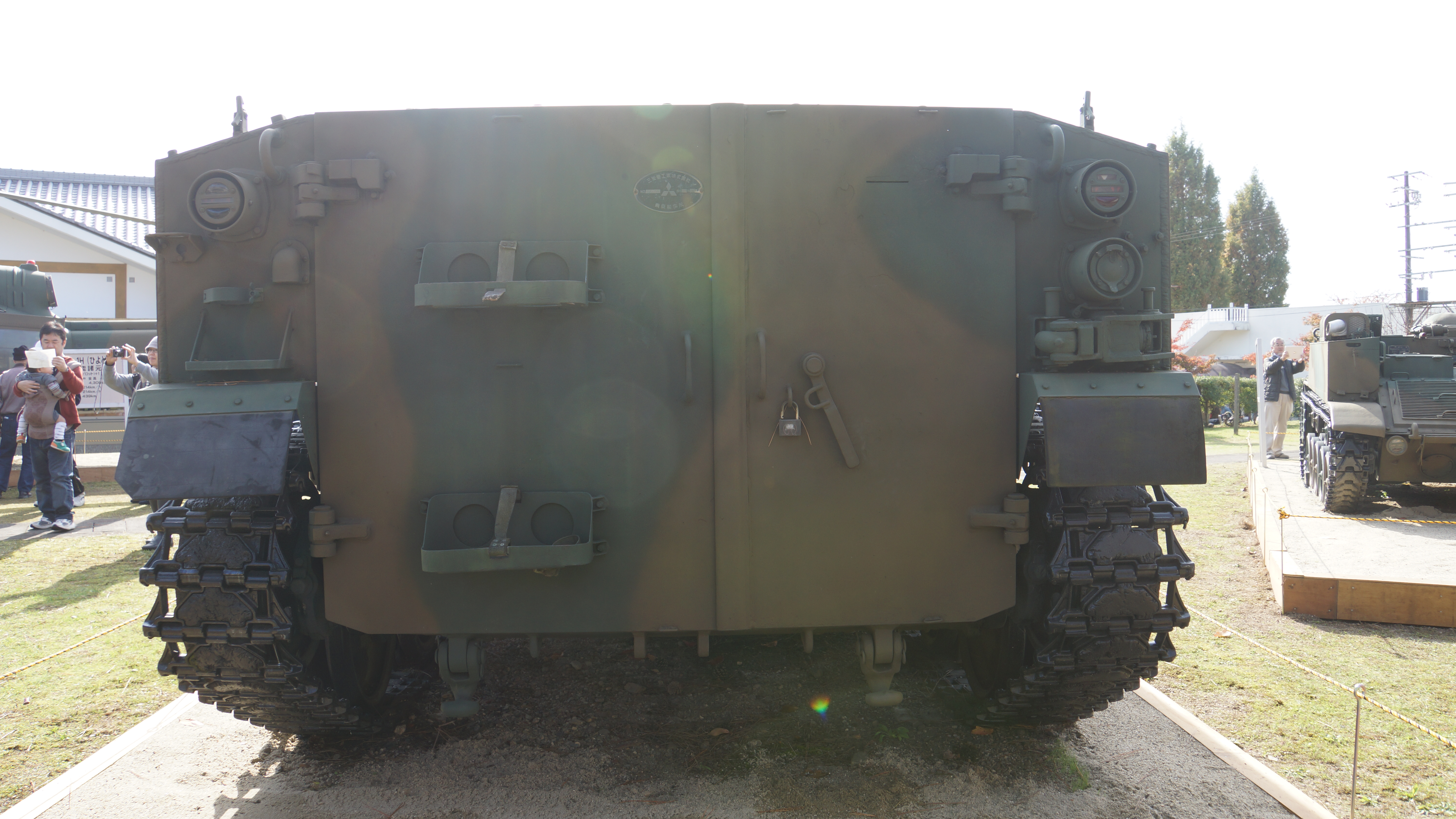
Rear view of the Type 60 at Camp Uji

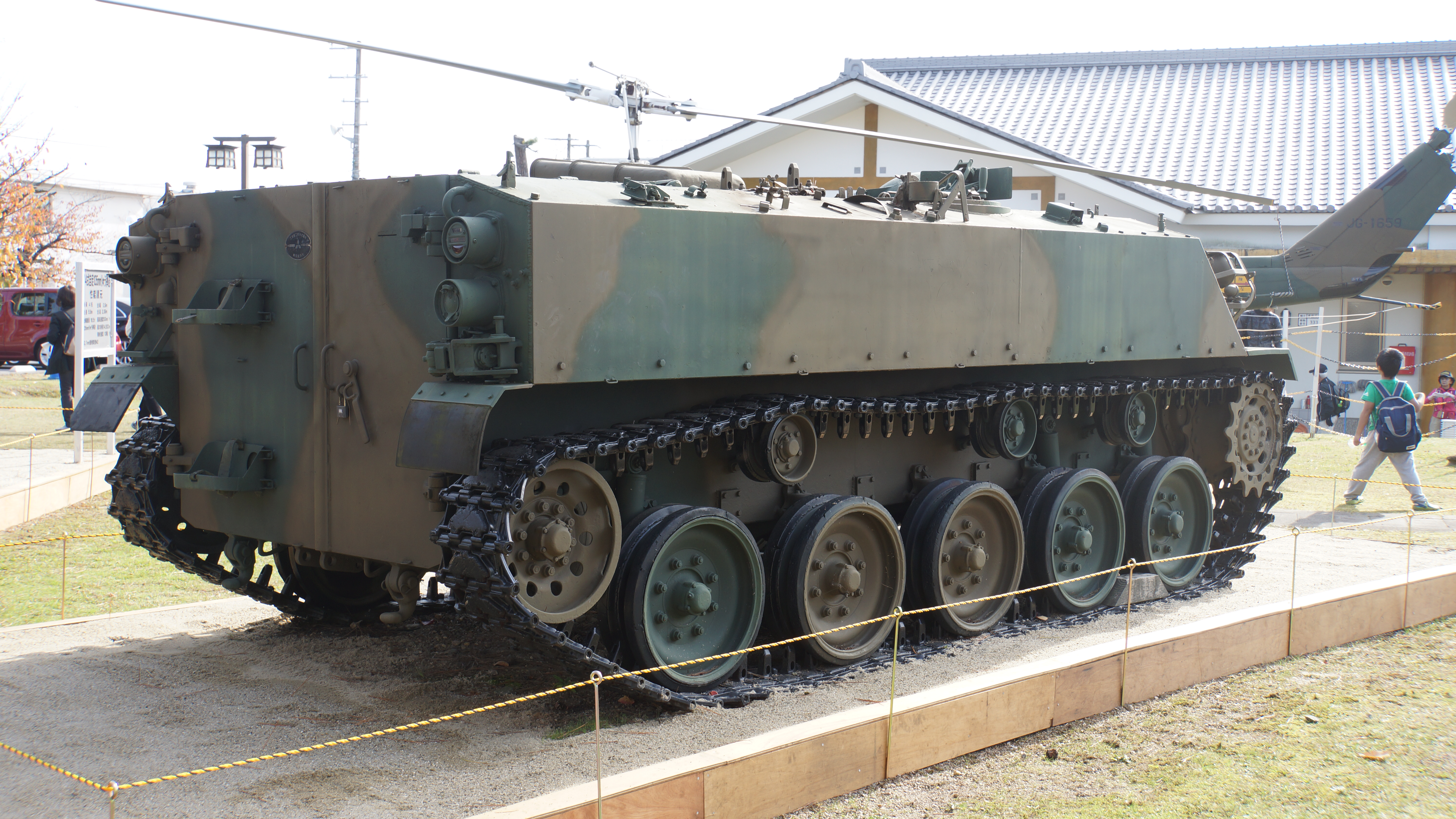
Right rear view of the Type 60 at Camp Uji

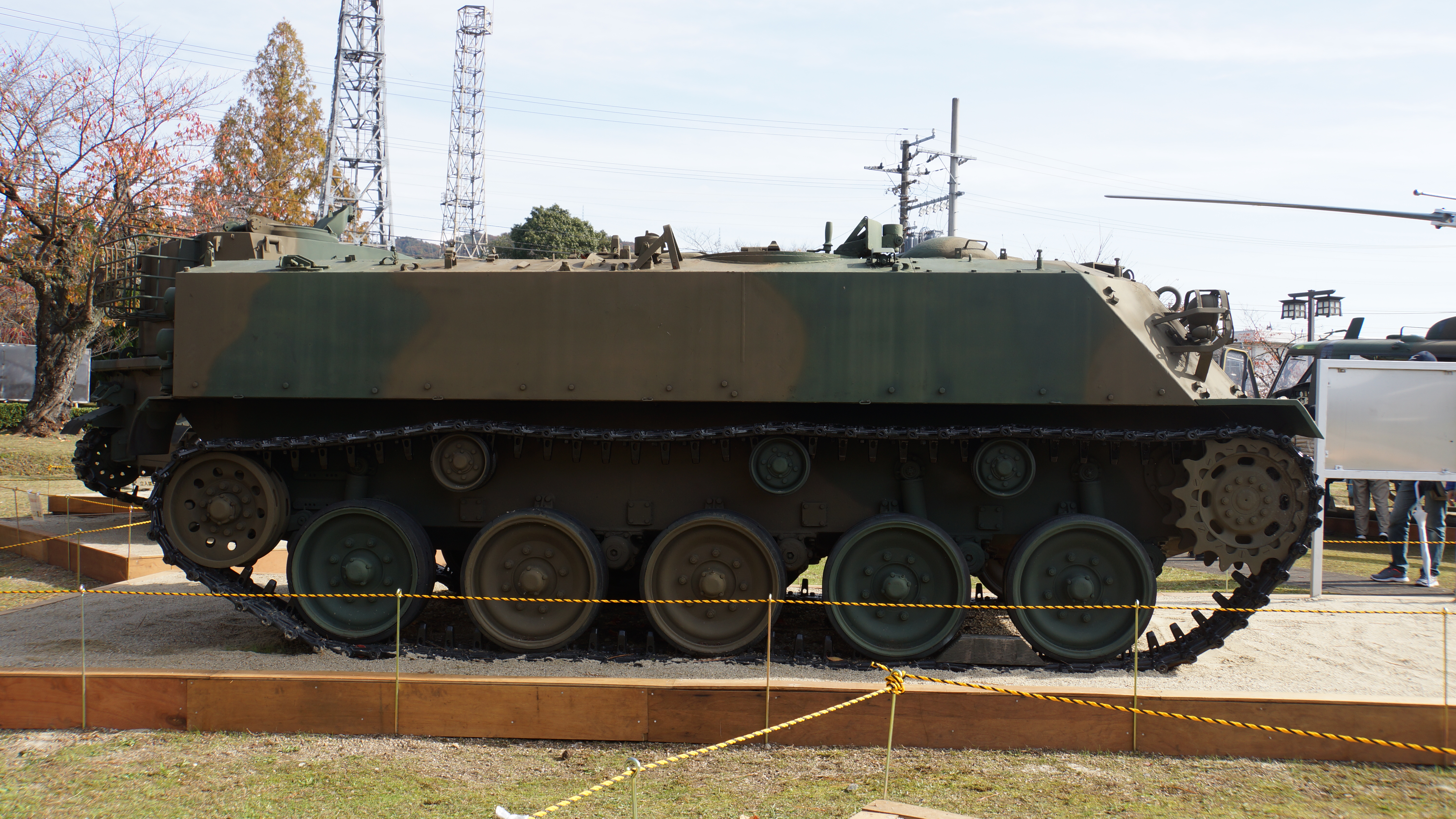
Right side view of the Type 60 at Camp Uji

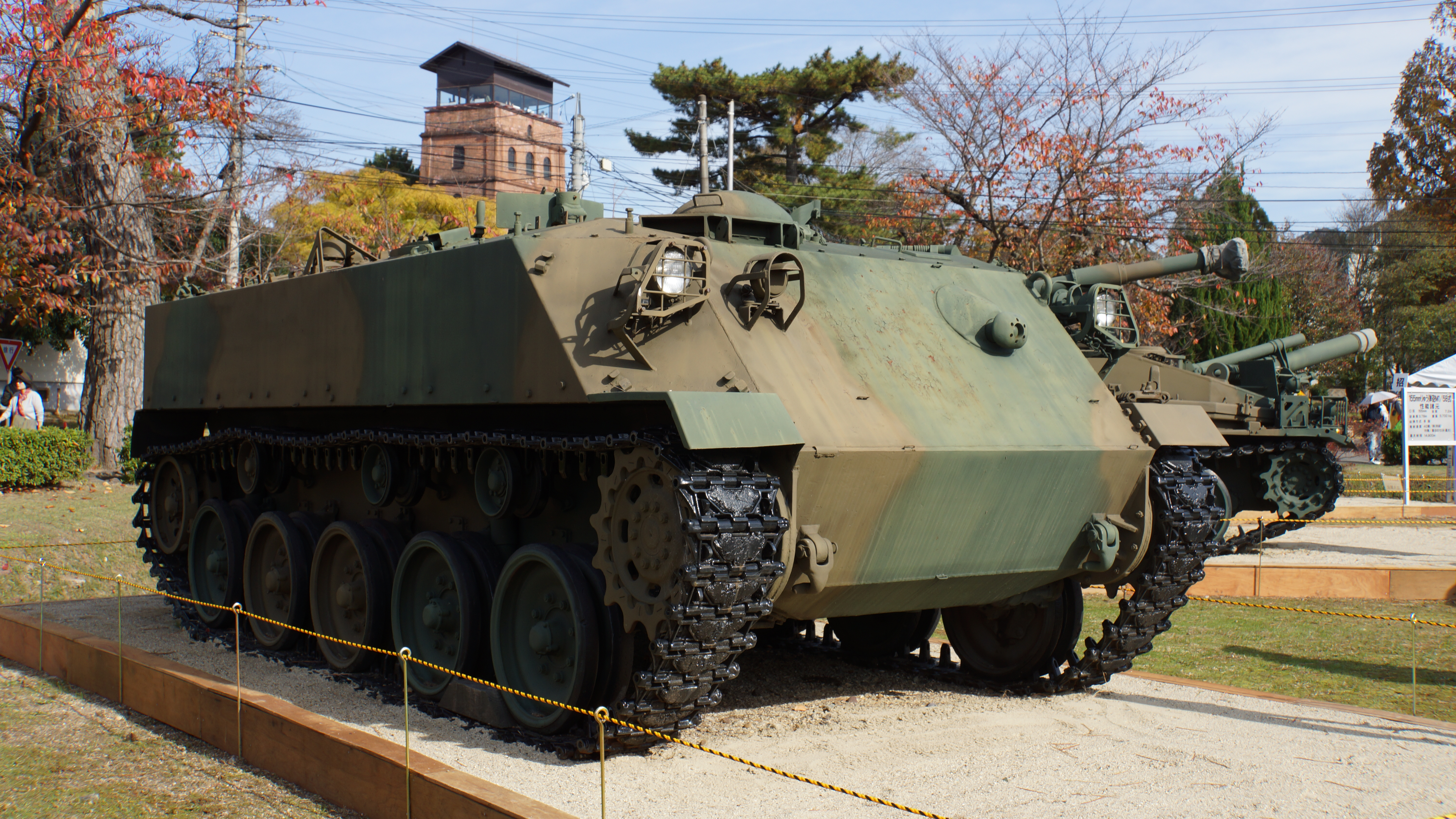
Right front view of the Type 60 at Camp Uji

== Similar vehicles ==
- AMX-VCI – (France)
- BTR-50 – (Soviet Union)
- FV432 – (United Kingdom)
- M59 – (United States)
- M113 – (United States)
- Pansarbandvagn 301 – (Sweden)
- Saurer 4K 4FA – (Austria)
- Type 63 – (China)

== See also ==
- List of historic, retired or reserve equipment of the Japan Ground Self-Defense Force
