= Type 96 120 mm self-propelled mortar =

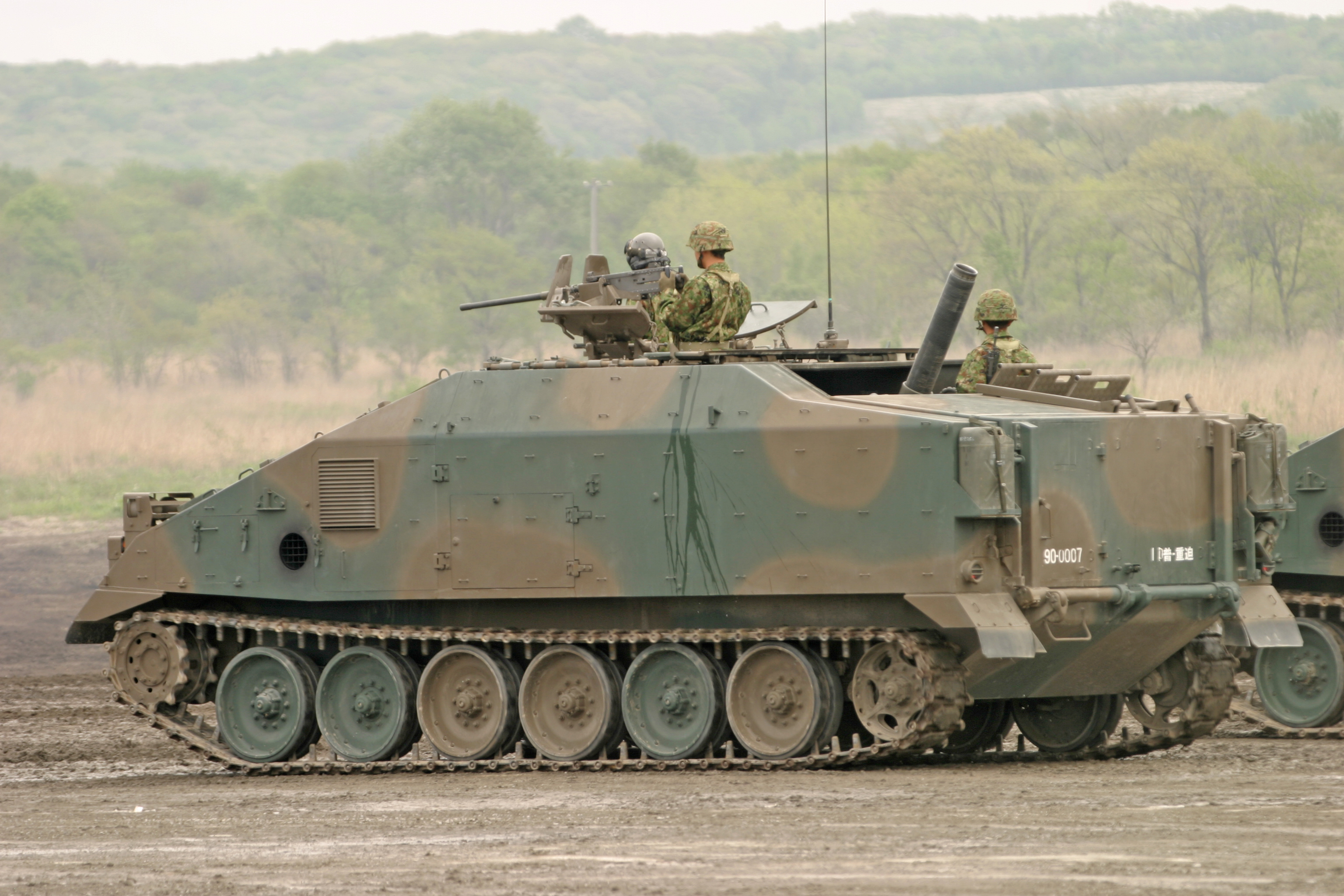
- Type 96 120 mm self-propelled mortar
- Type: Mortar carrier
- Place of origin: Japan

Service history
- In service: 1996 – present
- Used by: Japan

Production history
- Designer: Hitachi
- Designed: 1993
- Manufacturer: Hitachi/Howa
- Produced: 1996
- No. built: 24

Specifications
- Mass: 23.5 tonnes (25.9 short tons)
- Length: 6.7 metres (22 ft)
- Width: 2.99 metres (9.8 ft)
- Height: 2.95 metres (9.7 ft)
- Crew: 5
- Caliber: 120 millimetres (4.7 in)
- Elevation: left: 45° right:45°
- Armor: rolled homogeneous armour
- Main armament: 1x MO-120-RT 120 mm mortar, made under license by Howa
- Secondary armament: 1x M2HB 12.7 mm machine gun
- Engine: Mitsubishi 4ZF air-cooled V-type 4-cylinder diesel 300 horsepower 300 horsepower (300 PS)
- Suspension: torsion bar
- Operational range: 300 kilometres (190 mi)
- Maximum speed: 50 kilometres per hour (31 mph)

The Type 96 120 mm self-propelled mortar (96式自走120mm迫撃砲, kyuu-roku-shiki-jisou-120mm-hakugeki-hou) is a tracked armored mortar carrier that has been in service with the Japan Ground Self-Defense Force (JGSDF) since 1996. The official abbreviation for the vehicle is 120MSP and the common name is Jisou RT or Jisou 120 mota in JGSDF. It is nicknamed God Hammer.

Its chassis is based on the Type 73 armored personnel carrier and fields a licensed domestically produced version of the Mortier 120mm Rayé Tracté Modèle F1.

== See also ==
- Type 60 81 mm self-propelled mortar
- Type 60 107 mm self-propelled mortar
