= Mortier 120 mm Rayé Tracté Modèle F1 =

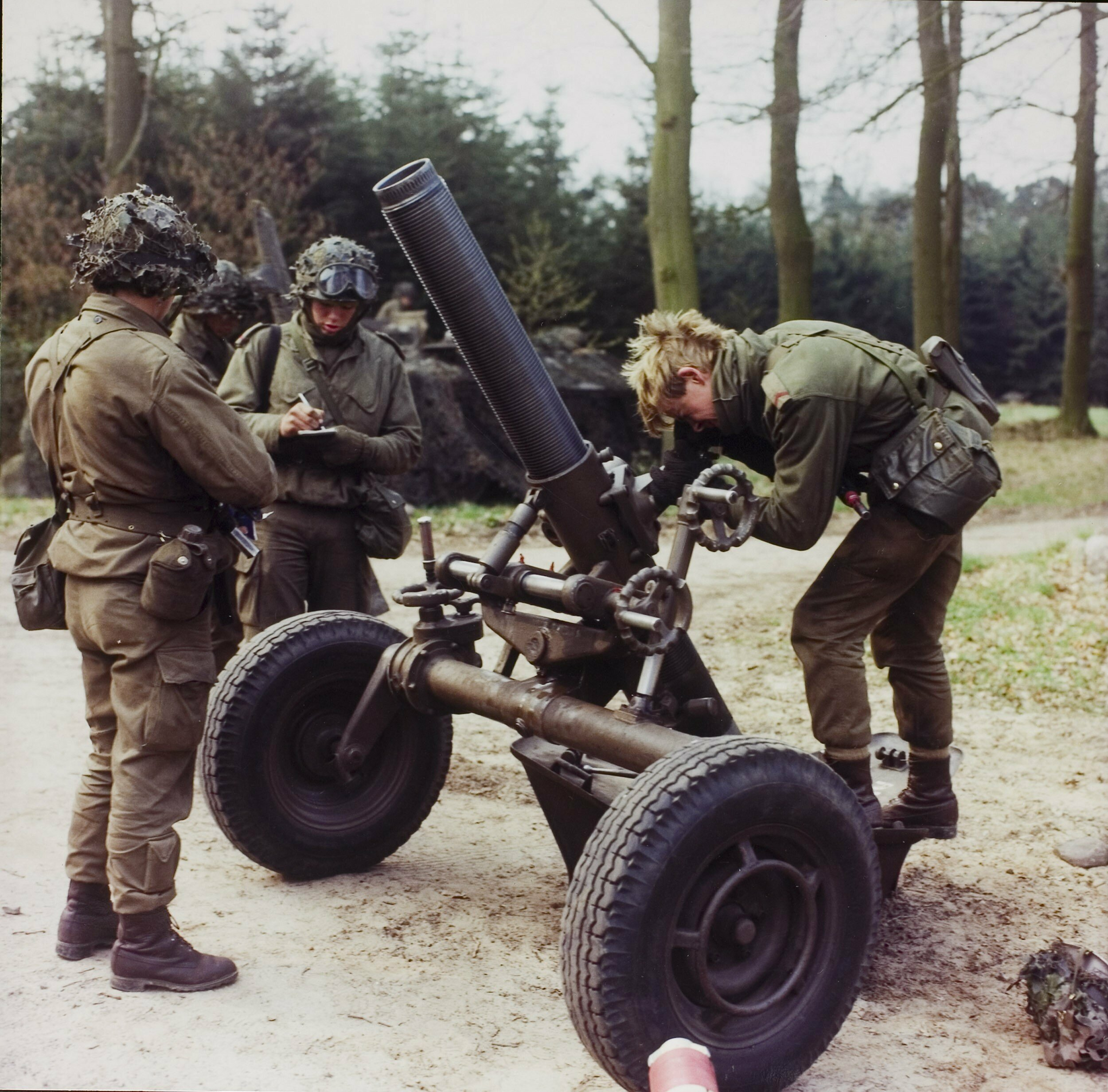
- Type: Heavy mortar
- Place of origin: France

Service history
- In service: 1961–present
- Used by: See Operators
- Wars: Gulf War; Lebanese Civil War; War in Afghanistan; Operation Serval; Russo-Ukrainian War

Production history
- Designer: Thales, Thomson-Brandt
- Manufacturer: Thales, TDA Armements (France), Thomson-CSF/Daimler Benz Aerospace (Germany), Hotchkiss Brandt (Netherlands), Howa (Japan)
- Produced: 1961–present

Specifications
- Mass: 582 kg (1,283 lb)
- Barrel length: 2.08 m (6 ft 10 in)
- Crew: 4 gunners, 2 vehicle crew
- Shell: 18.7 kg (41 lb)
- Calibre: 120 mm (4.7 in) NATO mortar round
- Carriage: wheeled
- Elevation: 30–85°
- Traverse: ±14° from centreline
- Rate of fire: 18 rounds per minute (maximum); 6 rounds per minute (sustained)
- Effective firing range: 8,140 m (8,900 yd) with standard projectile 12,850 m (14,050 yd) with rocket-assisted projectile

The MO-120 RT (factory designator) or MO-120-RT is a French heavy mortar. The RT in the designator stands for rayé, tracté, which means rifled, towed. The MO-120-RT is currently used by the French Army (where it is known as RT F1 or Mortier de 120 mm Rayé Tracté Modèle F1—"120 mm rifled towed mortar, model F1"), and has also been exported to more than 24 foreign countries or in some cases, produced under licence. It is issued to artillery units, where it complements artillery guns and systems; although infantry units operate it in some countries.

A vehicle-mounted and automated mortar system derived from the MO-120 RT, known as the 2R2M is in service with a number of nations.

== Design ==
The MO-120 RT uses 120 mm rounds with a range of 8.2 km (5.1 mi) and the PRPA (RAP-Rocket Assisted Projectile) with a range of 13 km (8.1 mi). The weapon can be fired either by dropping the round down the tube (after aligning of the rifling bands) resulting in an automatic firing once the bomb hits the tube base, or by a controlled firing by dropping the bomb down the tube and pulling on a lanyard that will in turn set off the triggering mechanism in the base of the tube.

Fired mortar rounds can reach as high as 4,000 m (13,000 ft) and hit the ground with an effective kill radius of 76 m (249 ft).

== Service ==
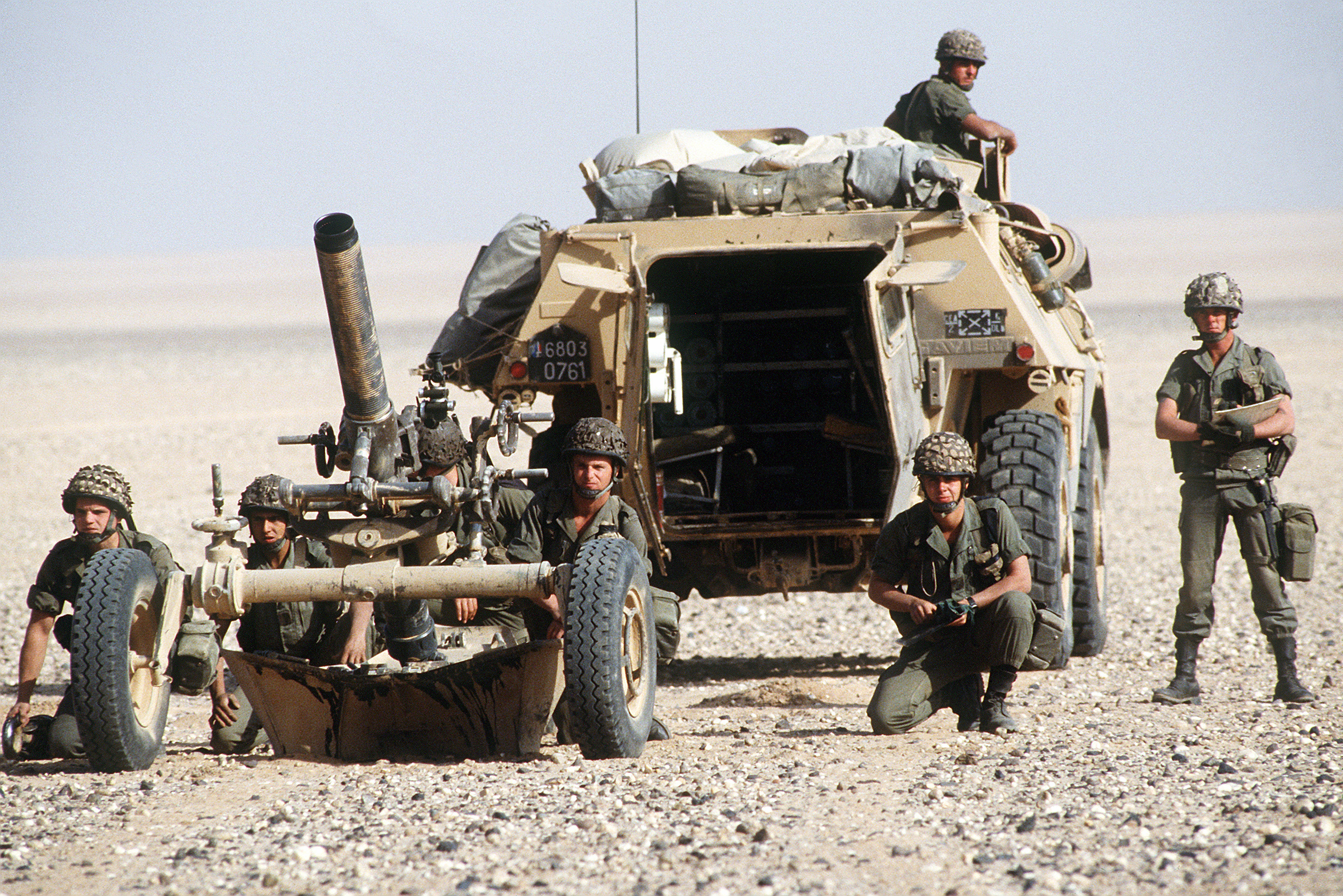
MO-120-RT-61 and Véhicule Tracteur de Mortier 120 during Opération Daguet.

In French service, this weapon is normally towed by the VTM 120 (Véhicule Tracteur Mortier de 120 mm), a wheeled armored vehicle that is a derivative of the VAB 4×4 series of armored personnel carrier. Towing is accomplished by a towing hitch that is screwed onto the muzzle of the weapon. The VTM 120 also carries 70 rounds for the mortar and offers basic ballistic protection from small arms fire and shrapnel for the crew. The RT-61 can also be towed by the AMX-10 TM (Tracteur de Mortier), which is a version of the AMX-10P tracked APC or the future French Scorpion SERVAL Vehicle.

In France, the mortars, which originally equipped infantry regiments, have now all been transferred to the artillery regiments, where they augment the 155 mm towed artillery.

The manufacturer is Thales, with former company names TDA Armements, Thomson-Brandt, as mentioned above, Thomson-CSF/Daimler Benz Aerospace (France/Germany), and Hotchkiss Brandt (The Netherlands) as the "HB Rayé".

== Variants ==
=== Turkish version ===
In Turkey, a variant was derived and manufactured by MKEK as the HY 12 mortar. It is towed by a Unimog light truck, carrying a crew of 6 with 60 mortar rounds. MKEK produces the "Mod 209 High-Explosive (HE) bomb" ammunition for this.

=== Japanese Type 96 ===
The Japan Ground Self-Defense Force operate the MO-120-RT both in the towed configuration and mounted in a vehicle, the Type 96.

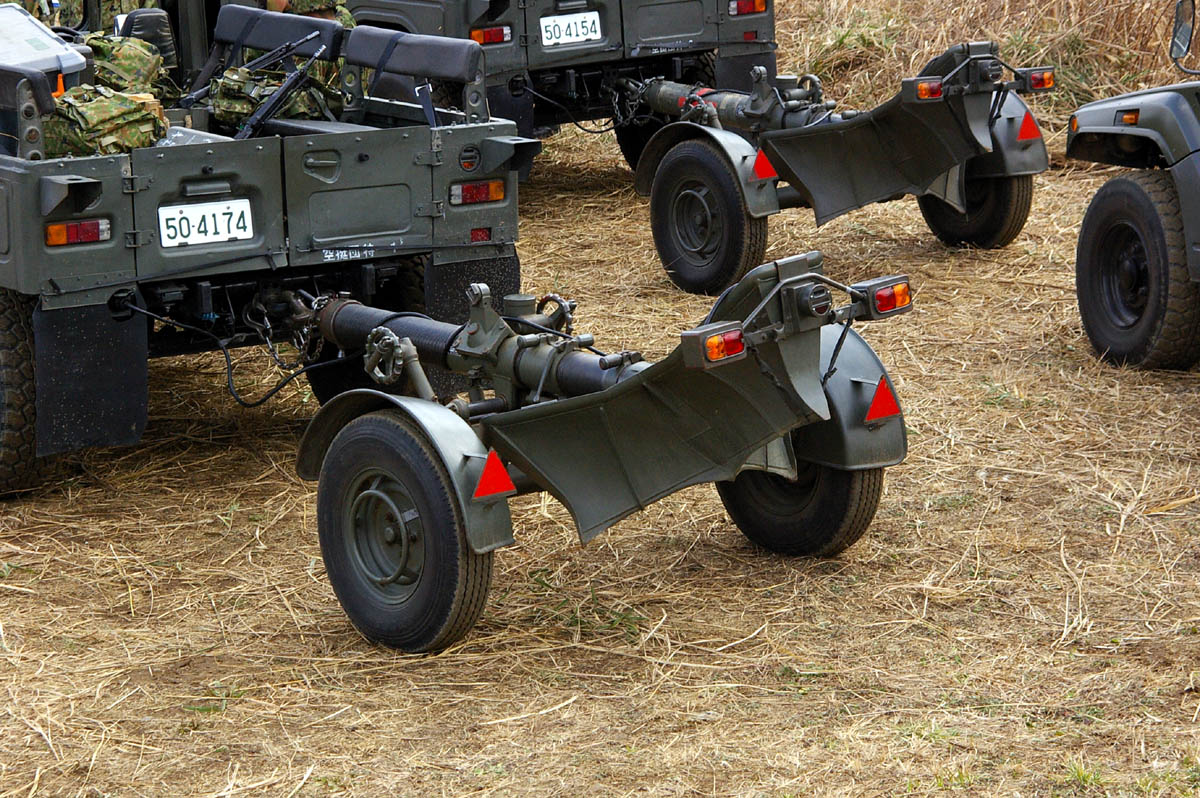
Towed configuration in Japanese service. Prime mover is Toyota Mega Cruiser.

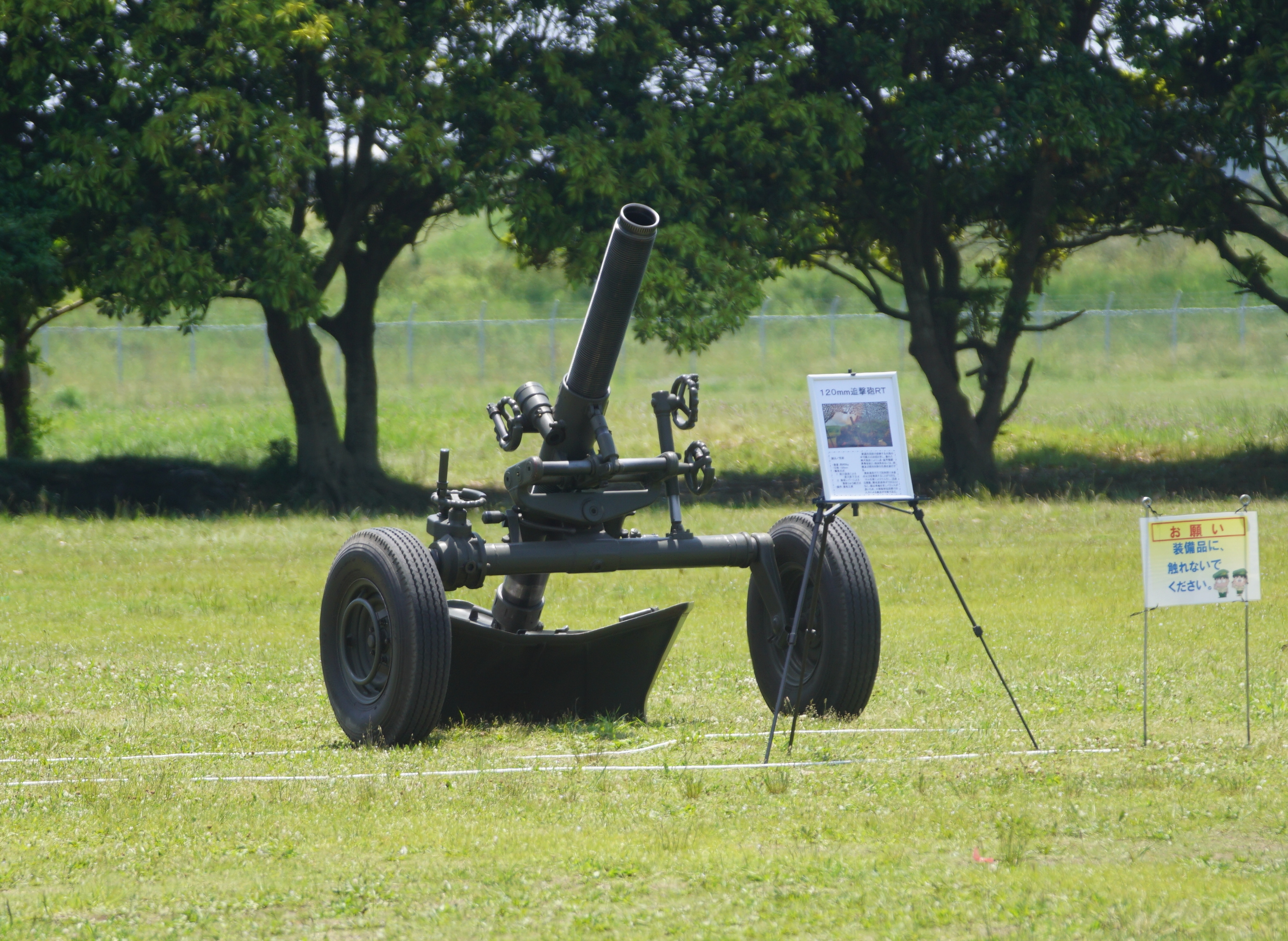
JGSDF version Type 96 Heavy mortar

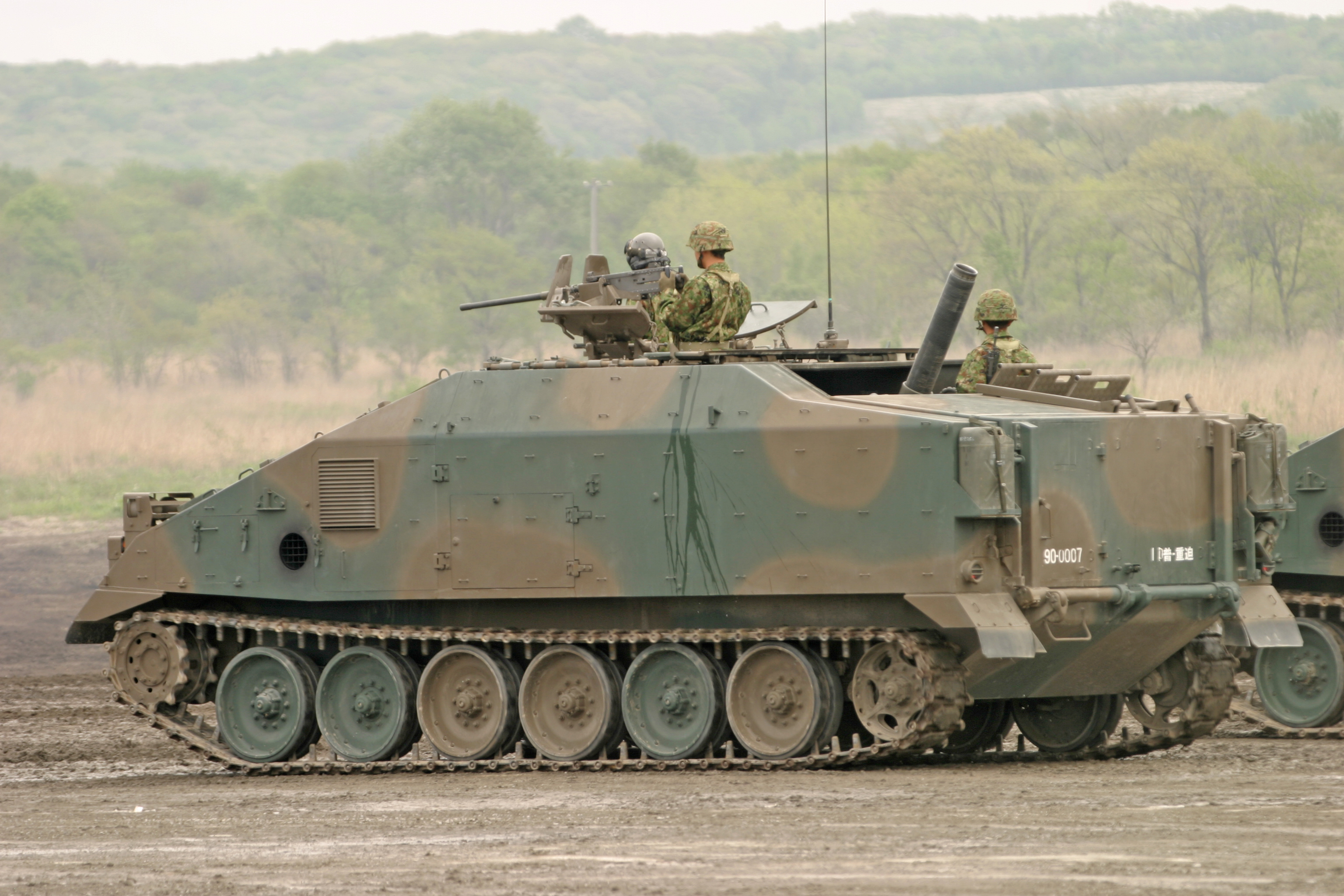
JGSDF SP Type 96 variant

=== 2R2M ===
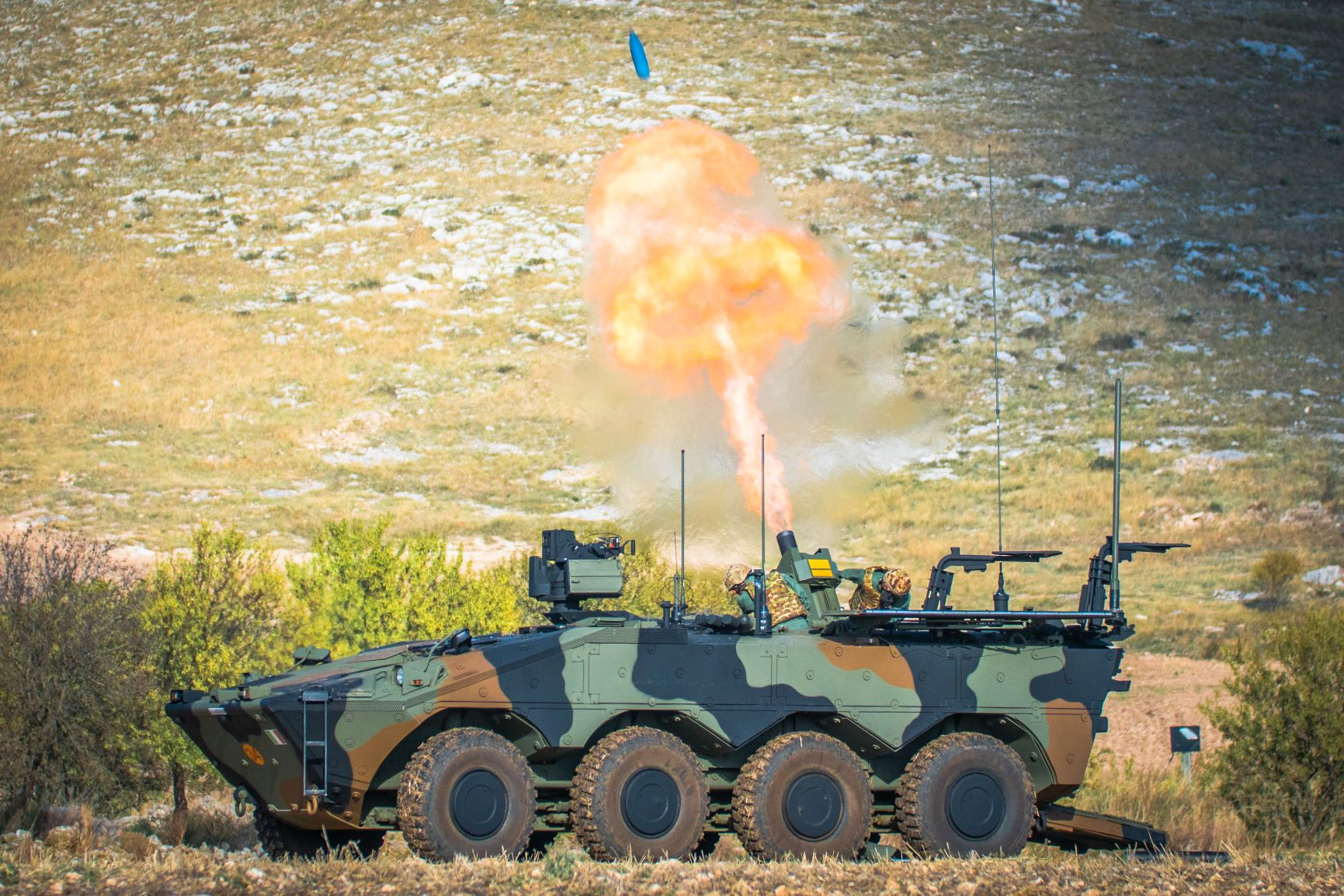
Italian Army 2R2M mortar

The 2R2M is a vehicle-mounted and automated mortar system derived from the MO-120 RT.

=== M327 expeditionary fire support system ===
The United States Marine Corps began looking for an expeditionary fire support system (EFSS) in 2001 after the start of operations in Afghanistan exposed their lack of expeditionary artillery lighter than a 155 mm howitzer but heavier than a 60 mm mortar. Early on, the 120 RT weapon became tied to the development of the MV-22 Osprey, which would contain a Growler ITV jeep that would tow it; both efforts were troubled and experienced delays. The EFSS was first used operationally in Afghanistan in February 2011, firing an M1105 illumination projectile. The full EFSS was introduced in 2009, consisting of two light vehicles, one towing the mortar and the other an ammunition trailer, that fit inside an MV-22 or CH-53E Super Stallion; an EFSS battery is made up of roughly 50 marines.

From 2011 to 2015, the Marines and Raytheon developed the precision extended range munition (PERM) for the EFSS, a GPS-guided round that delivers greater range and better accuracy. The 35 lb (16 kg) round increased range from 8 km (5.0 mi) to 16 km (9.9 mi), falling within 10 m (33 ft) of the target and as close as two meters, costing $18,000 each, and having 2.5–3 times the lethality. The extra range came from tail fins for stabilization and canards near the nose to make in-flight adjustments and make it glide as it descends, and the greater lethality was a result of this flight path; normal artillery rounds impact at a 45-degree angle, which blows the top half of the round straight up into the air; however, descending at a sharp angle places more energy and fragmentation directly on a target. It was even capable of hitting reverse slope positions by shaping its trajectory. Greater accuracy also reduces logistical burdens, as using fewer rounds to destroy one target means a unit can last longer without needing resupply. The PERM was to begin fielding in 2018. Raytheon planned to add semi-active laser (SAL) guidance to PERM rounds to enable them to hit moving targets.

By December 2017, the U.S. Marines had divested the EFSS. With the Marines working to extend the range of their artillery arsenal, the EFSS's limited range was not seen as well suited for future missions, so it was chosen for divestment in favor of moving more resources for precision fires. In 2021, the role was filled by the Hero-120 loitering munition launched from various vehicles.

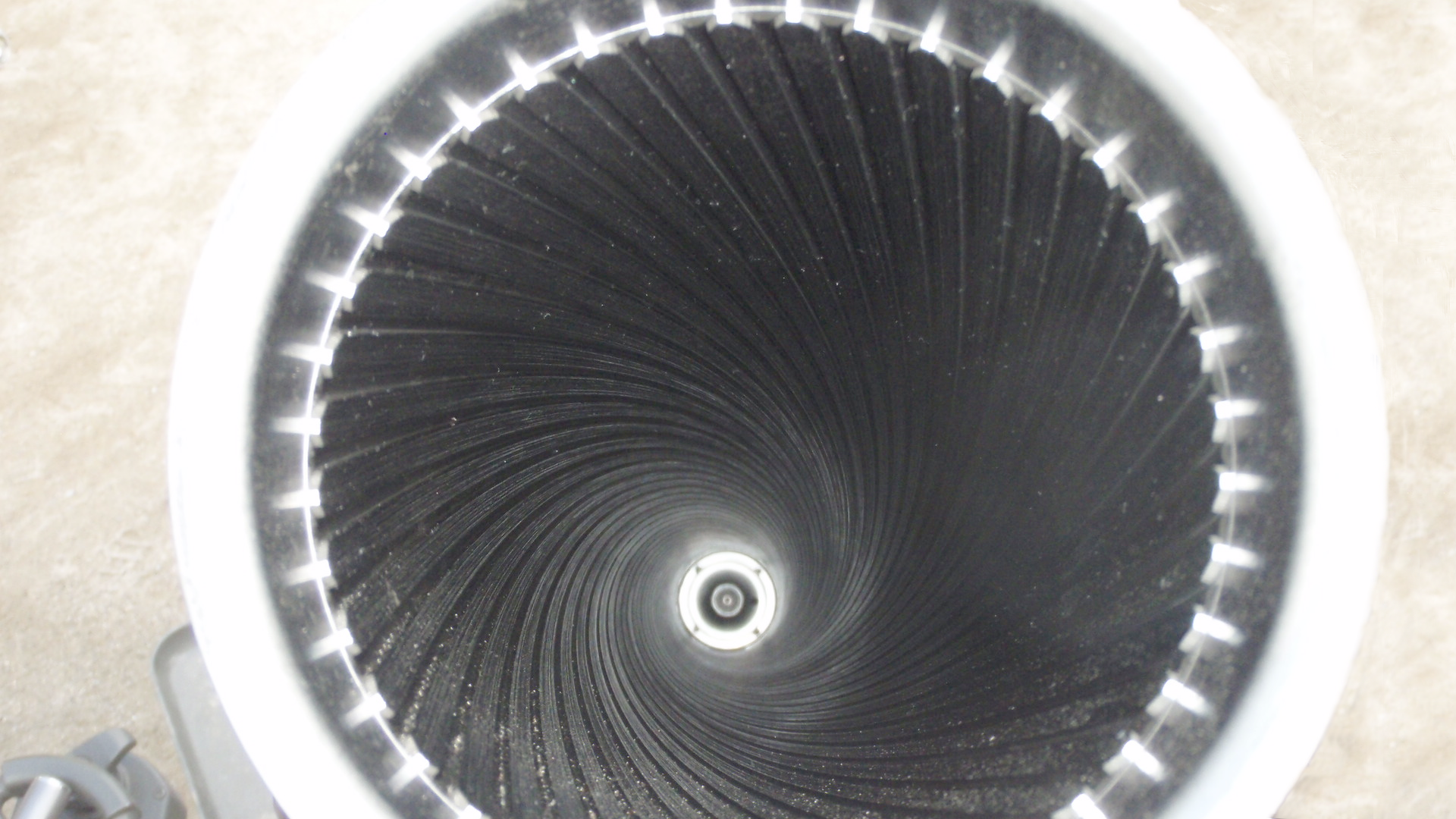
M327 mortar rifling

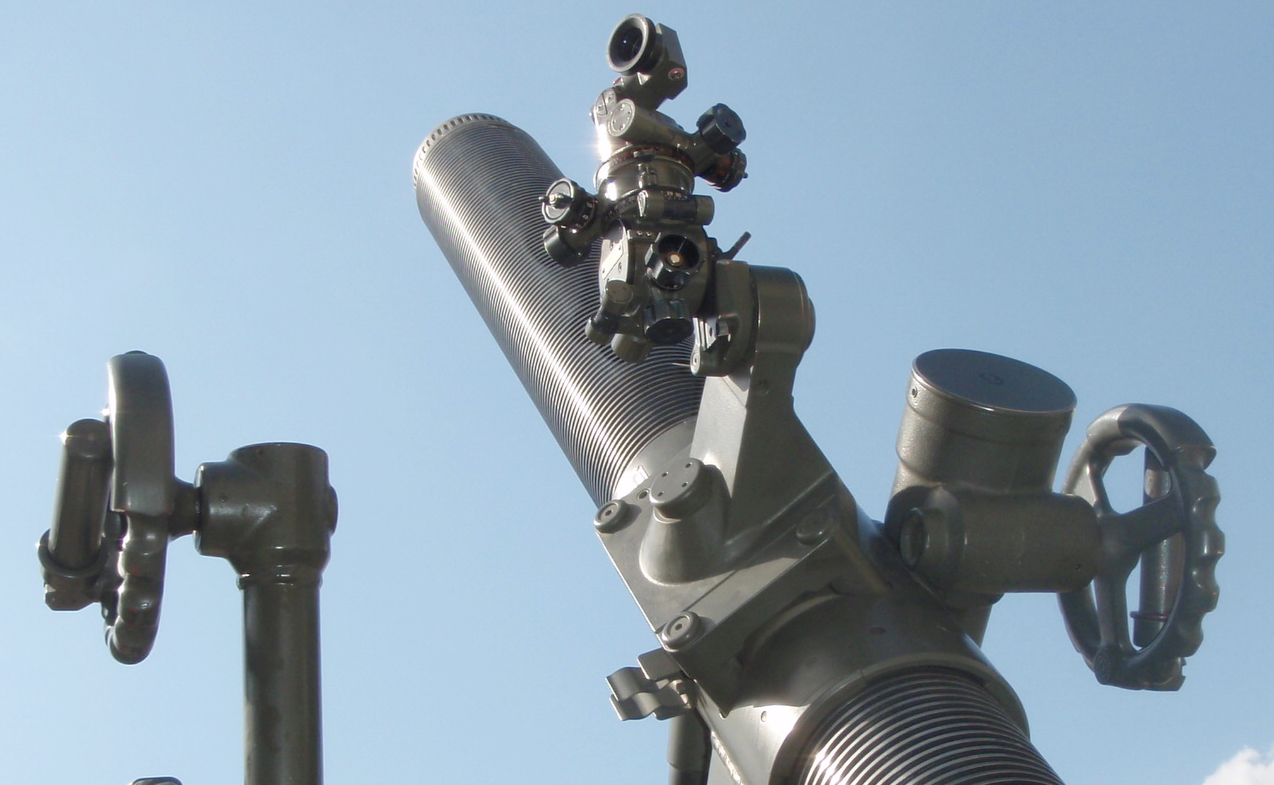
M327 mortar sight

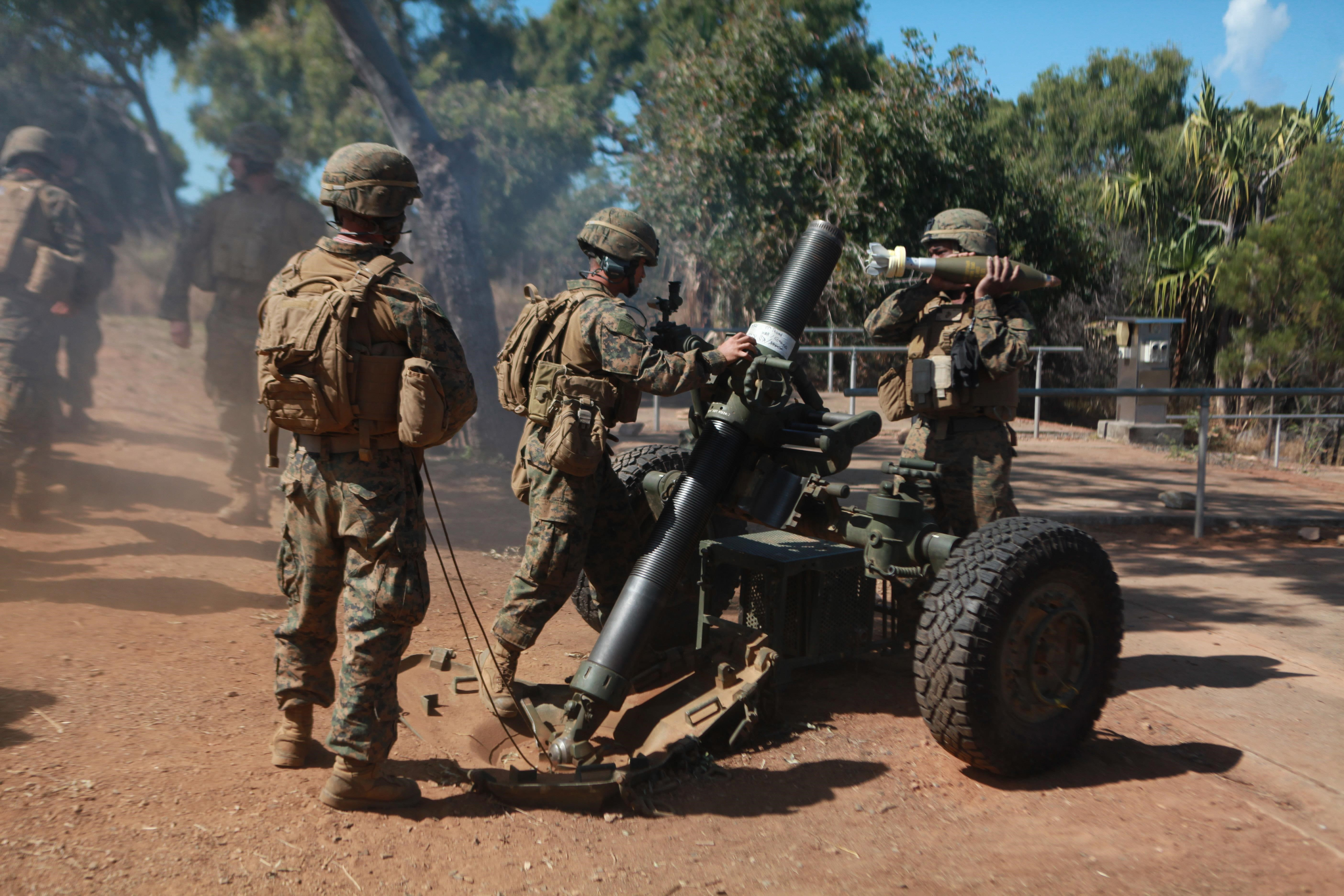
M327 120 mm rifled towed mortar

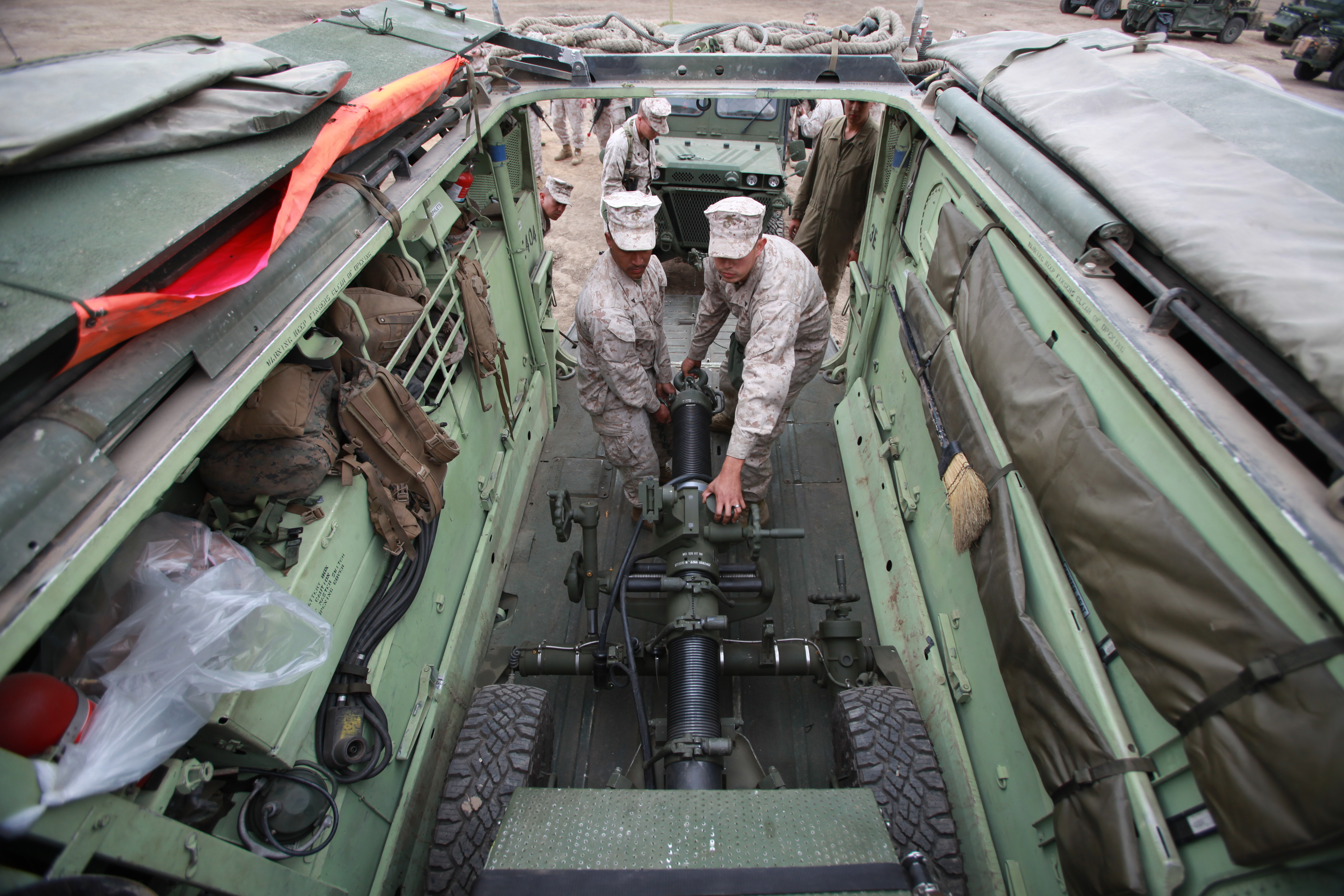
USMC M327 transported internally by an amphibious assault vehicle

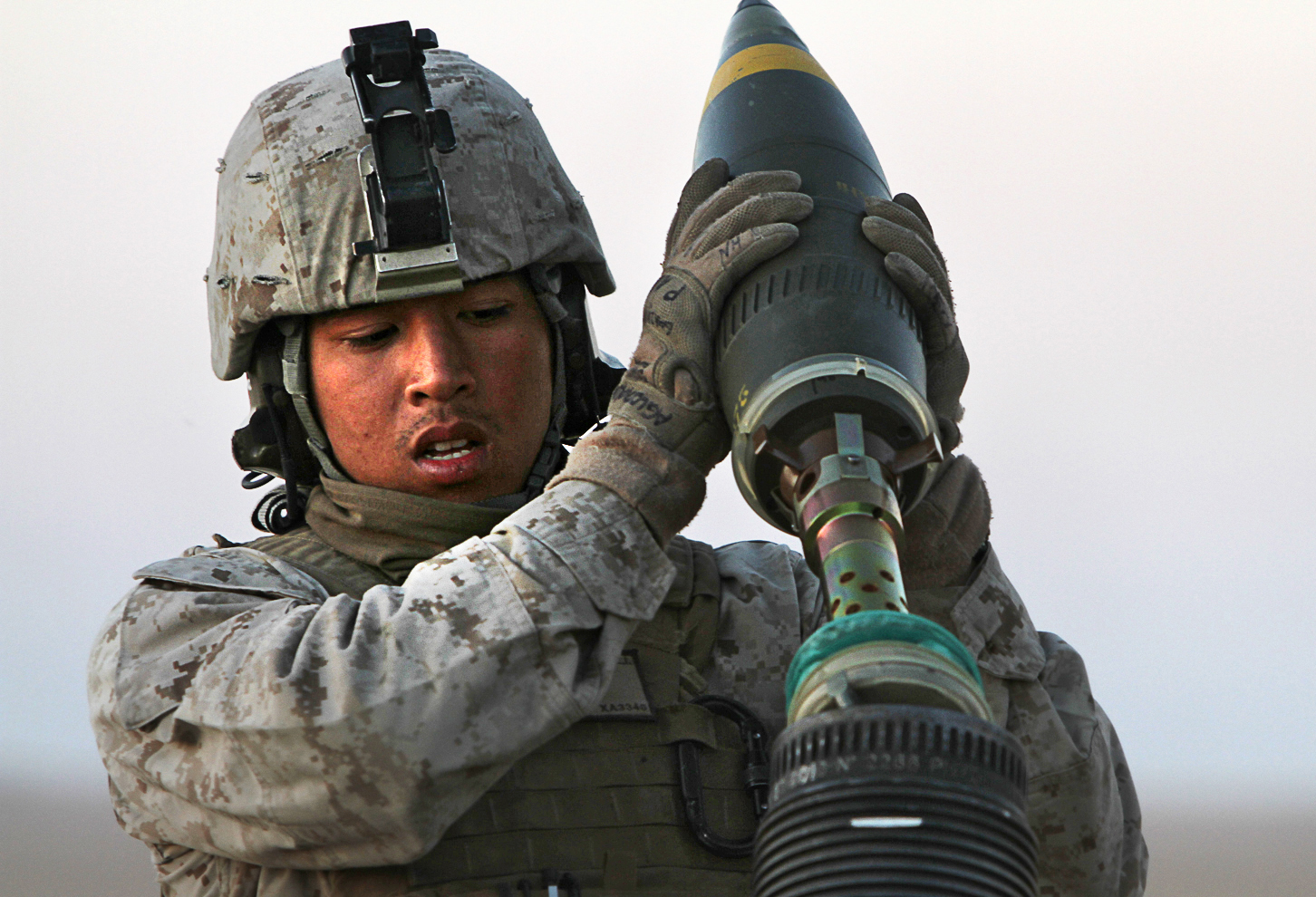
USMC high-explosive round showing rifling

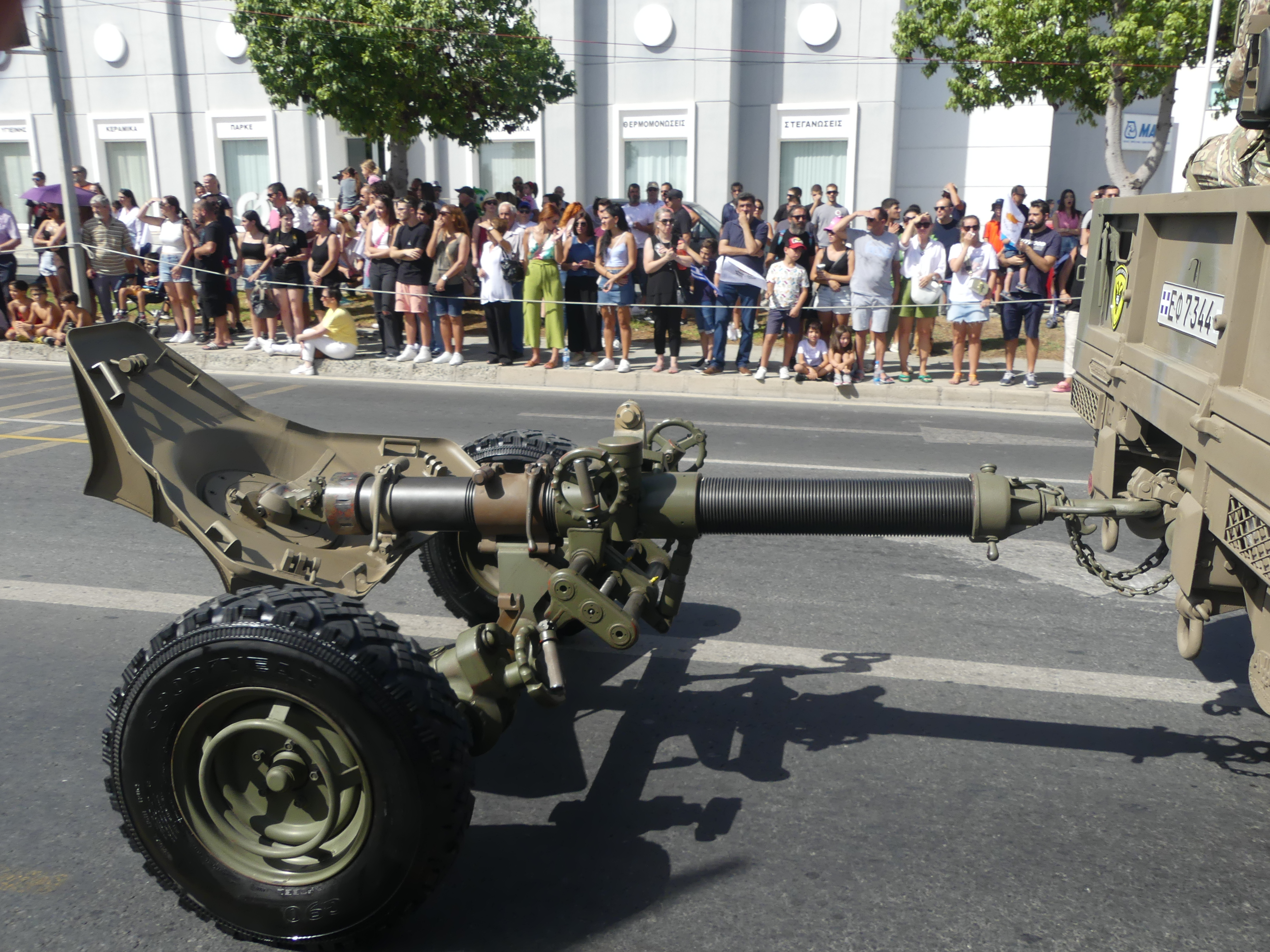
A MO-120 RT of the Cypriot National Guard

== Operators ==
- Belgium: 52 delivered in 1965–1966.
- Cameroon: 16 delivered in 1973.
- Colombia: 38 Turkish HY1-12 delivered in 2009.
- Cyprus: 114 delivered in 1990–1991. 112 in service in 2016.
- Djibouti: 20 delivered in 1981.
- Gabon: 4 delivered in 1986.
- France: 128 in 2016.
- Italy: 139 delivered between 2000 and 2004. The Military Balance gives 142 in service as of 2016.
- Japan: 462 delivered between 1990 and 2017.
- Kuwait: ~12 in service.
- Kurdistan: French aid to Peshmerga Forces to fight ISIS, Also captured from the old Iraqi Military during Operation Iraqi Freedom.
- Lebanon: 24 delivered in 2012.
- Mexico: 32 delivered in 1988, still in service.
- Netherlands: 145 delivered in 1966–1968
- Pakistan: In service with the Pakistan Army and Frontier Corps.
- Qatar: 200 in service
- Saudi Arabia: 200 delivered in 1990–1991 and 25 2R2M in 2009–2010, both used by the National Guard.
- Turkey: 127 deployed in Northern Cyprus as of 2016.
- Ukraine: 4 delivered by Belgium during the Russian invasion of Ukraine

=== Former operators ===
- Canada
- Iraq
- Panama Formerly used by the Panama Defense Forces.
- Rwanda: 25 delivered in 1990–1991.
- United States: 66 delivered between 2008 and 2013—in service with the US Marine Corps as the M327 120 mm Expeditionary Fire Support System Phased out in 2017.

== Variants ==
- MO-120-LT – Smooth-bore version for the mountain artillery.
