= 81 mm mortar =

Weapon class

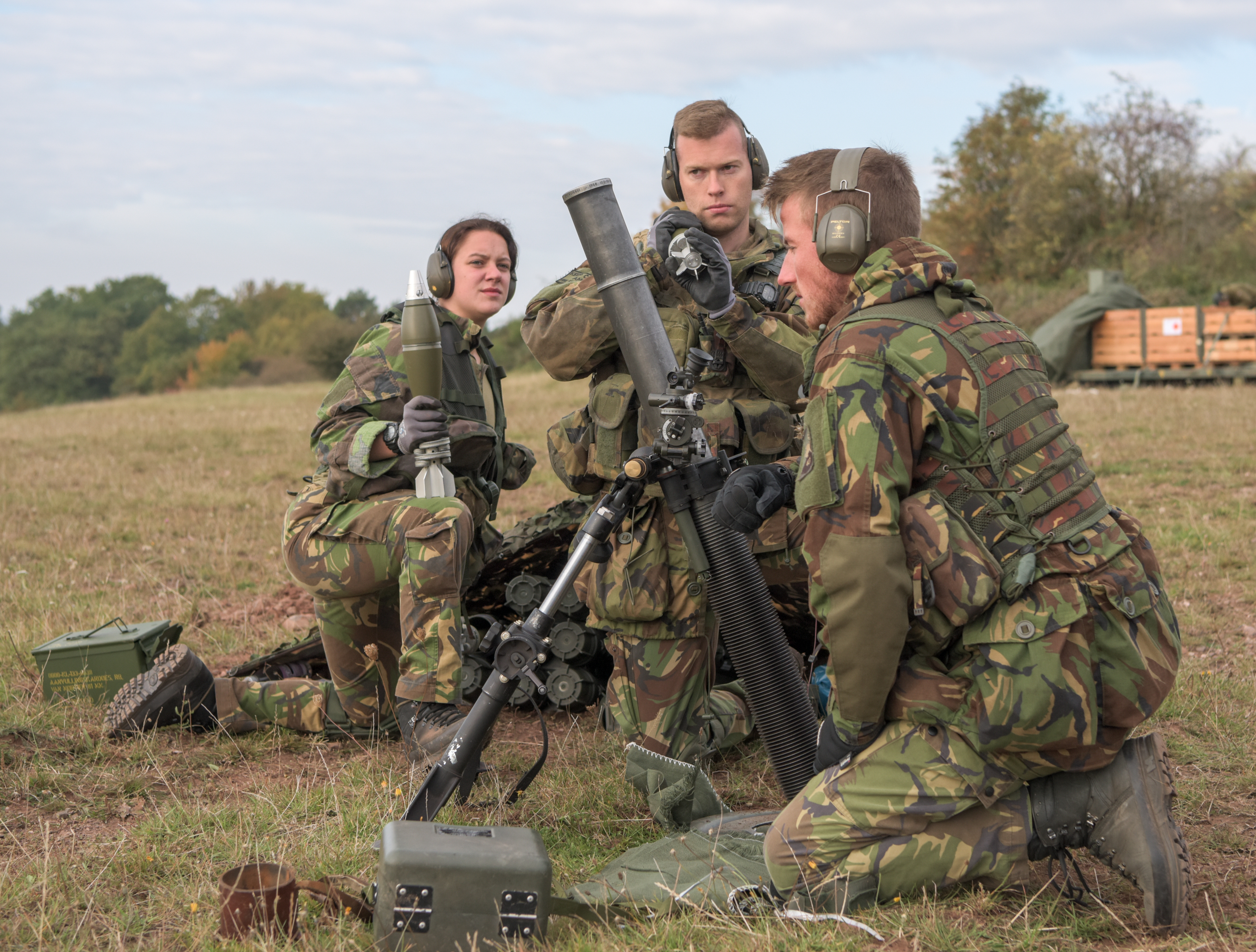
81mm L16 mortar being used by Dutch soldiers in 2017.

An 81-mm mortar is a type of medium-weight mortar. It is a smooth-bore, muzzle-loading, high-angle-of-fire weapon used for long-range indirect fire support of light infantry, air assault, and airborne units across the entire front of a battalion zone of influence.

Many countries use or have used an 81-mm mortar in their armed forces. Examples are:

- Canada - L16 81mm mortar
- Finland – 81 KRH 71 Y
- France – Brandt Mle 27/31
- Germany – Granatwerfer 34
- Greece – E44-E 81 mm Mortar
- Italy – Mortaio da 81/14 Modello 35
- India – 81mm Mortar E1 with CES items (note, CES means "Complete Equipment Schedule" items which are the essential accessories, tools, and ancillary equipment required for the proper functioning, maintenance, and operation of the 81mm Mortar E1)
- Myanmar – BA-90 and MA-8
- United Kingdom – L16 81mm mortar
- United States – M252 mortar
- Turkey – MKE 81mm UT1 & MKE 81mm NT1

Warsaw Pact countries and China use a similar 82 mm caliber for the same purpose.

== See also ==
- List of infantry mortars

== See also ==
- Category:81mm mortars
- Category:82 mm artillery
