= M1299 howitzer =

American 155 mm self-propelled artillery

M1299
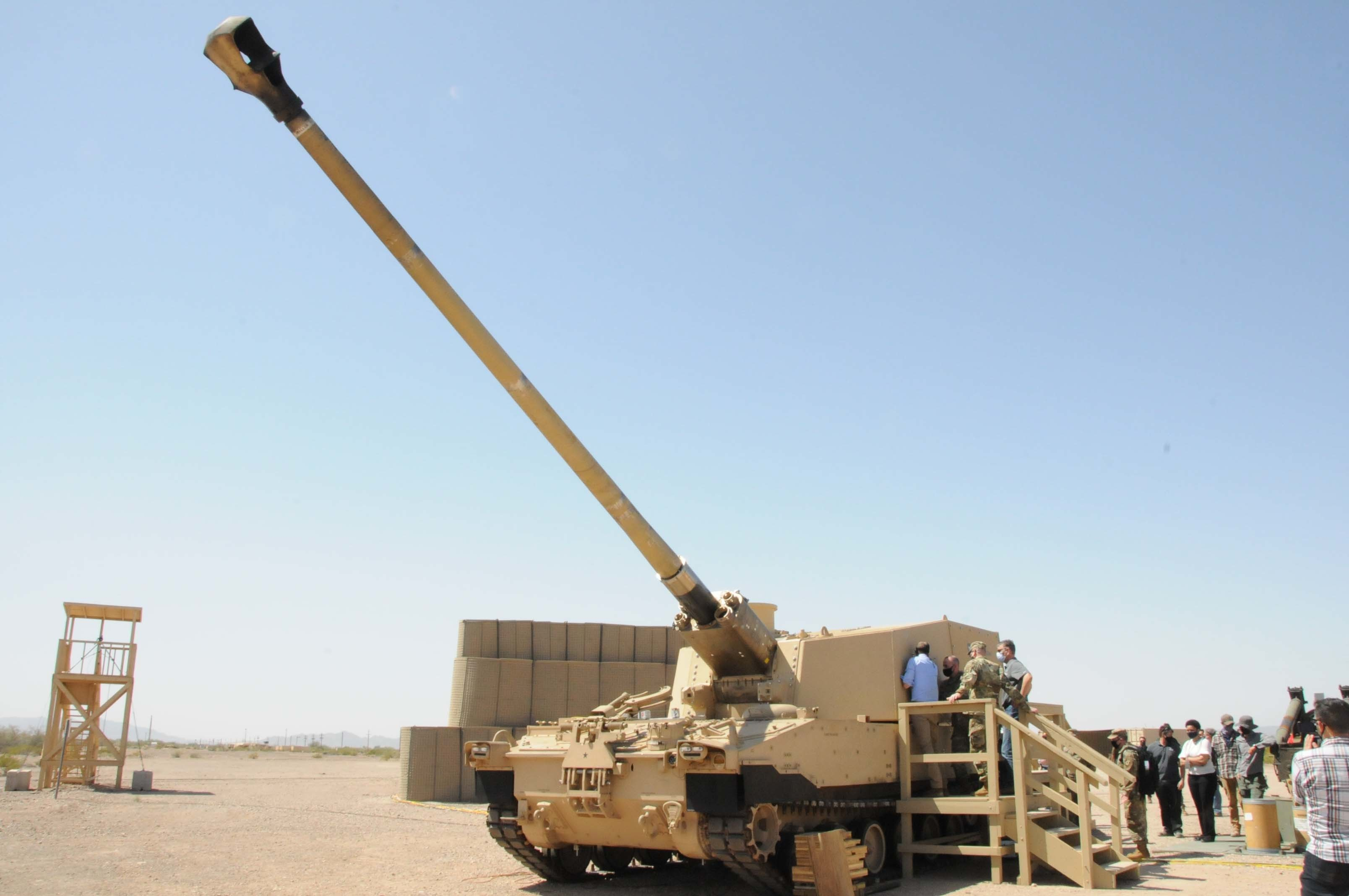
- An Extended Range Cannon Artillery (ERCA) during a test in March 2021, at the U.S. Army Yuma Proving Ground
- Type: Self-propelled howitzer
- Place of origin: United States

Production history
- Designed: 2019-2024
- Manufacturer: BAE Systems

Specifications
- Crew: 4 (driver, loader, gunner, commander)
- Traverse: 360°
- Rate of fire: 3 rpm (10 with autoloader)
- Effective firing range: 70 km (43 mi) (rocket-assisted round); 110 km (68 mi) (XM1155 round)
- Main armament: 155 mm L/58 XM907 gun
- Engine: Cummins diesel 600 hp (450 kW)
- Suspension: torsion bar

The M1299 Howitzer was an American prototype 155 mm self-propelled howitzer developed by BAE Systems beginning in 2019 under the Extended Range Cannon Artillery (ERCA) program. It was based on the M109A7 howitzer and was primarily designed for the purpose of improving the M109's effective range. The program was canceled in 2024.

== History ==
The Extended Range Cannon Artillery program was designed to produce a self-propelled howitzer system with an improved range and rate of fire compared to the existing M109A7 Howitzer, in response to developments of Russian and Chinese artillery systems, which had become capable of outranging American systems.

During tests conducted in 2018, the M777 howitzer was able to double its range through the use of higher energy propellant and rocket-assisted projectiles, hitting targets over 37 miles (60 km) away. Using the same principles, the Extended Range Cannon Artillery was developed. BAE Systems was given a $45 million contract in 2019 to incorporate the ERCA's cannon into an M109 chassis, which was unveiled at that year's Association for the United States Army.

Increased range and accuracy was accomplished by having a longer barrel, at 58 calibers long, and by using the XM1113 rocket-assisted artillery shell. In 2020, the ERCA successfully hit a target 43 mi (69 km) away, which is over twice the range typically achieved by an M777 using the same round.

According to the United States Army, the howitzer was to be completed in 2021 and undergo operational assessment in 2023. Due to issues with excessive wear on its barrel, the project was canceled in 2024.

On 18 December 2025, Hanwha Aerospace announced a partnership with DEVCOM-AC (Army Combat Capabilities Development Command's Armaments Center) that both parties will exchange technical data and expertise under a Cooperative Research and Development Agreement (CRADA). The U.S. Army's 58 caliber gun tube from ERCA will be integrated to the K9A1 Thunder for further tests and researches.

== Design ==
=== Gun system ===
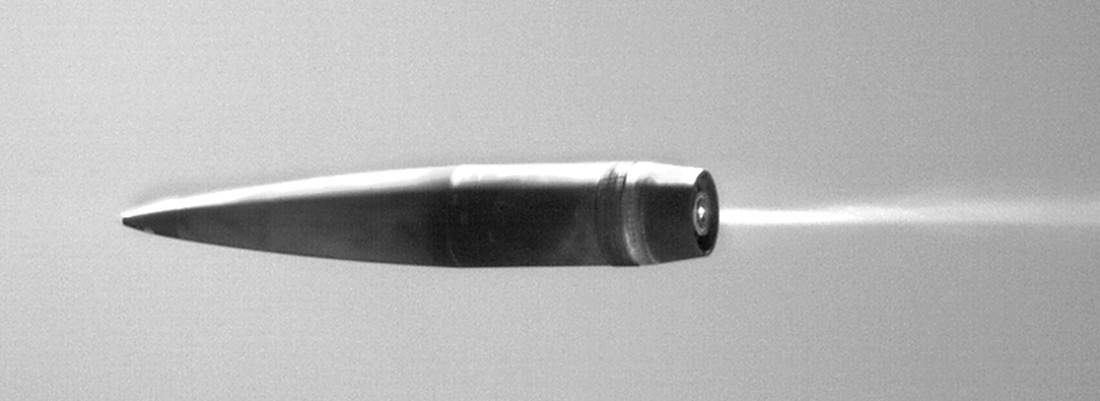
A XM1113 extended range artillery round, shown here at a range demonstration, uses a rocket-assist motor

The M1299 was armed with a new 155 mm L/58 caliber long, 9.1 m gun tube, XM907 gun, designed by Benét Laboratories to fire the XM1113 rocket-assisted round. This would give a range of over 70 km (43 mi) – much greater than the 38 km (24 mi) of the M109A7 Paladin. An autoloader was planned to allow rates of fire of up to 10 rounds per minute. Originally, the autoloader was planned to carry 31 rounds and be in service by 2024. As designed, it was too large for the vehicle, so it was reduced to a 23-round capacity for better weight, center of gravity, and "onboard kills".

In December 2022, the XM907E2 cannon fired an XM1155 sub-caliber projectile out to 110 km (68 mi). The shell was intended to hit long-range targets that previously would require the use of more expensive missiles.

== See also ==
- XM2001 Crusader, a U.S. Army self-propelled howitzer canceled in 2002
- XM1203 non-line-of-sight cannon, a U.S. Army self-propelled howitzer of the Future Combat Systems Manned Ground Vehicles program canceled in 2009
- Panzerhaubitze 2000, the self-propelled howitzer of the German army
- K9 Thunder, the self-propelled howitzer of the Korean Armed Forces
- Next Generation Combat Vehicle, an on-going U.S. Army combat vehicle acquisition program
- AHS Krab, Polish self-propelled howitzer
- T-155 Fırtına self-propelled howitzer, Turkish variant of K9 Thunder
- AS-90 self-propelled howitzer designed in UK
- 2S35 Koalitsiya-SV self-propelled howitzer designed in Russia
- PLZ-05 self-propelled howitzer designed in China
- SSPH Primus self-propelled howitzer designed in Singapore
- Type 99 155 mm self-propelled howitzer self-propelled howitzer designed in Japan
