= FSCS =

FSCS may refer to:

- Financial Services Compensation Scheme, a UK deposit insurance scheme
- Future Scout and Cavalry System, a joint British–American scout vehicle
