= Future Scout and Cavalry System/TRACER =

US/British armored reconnaissance vehicle

The American Future Scout and Cavalry System (FSCS) and British Tactical Reconnaissance Armoured Combat Equipment Requirement (TRACER) were a joint U.S.–British reconnaissance vehicle program.

The program was begun to replace the UK's Sabre and Scimitar reconnaissance vehicles. The U.S. joined later and sought to replace their M3 Bradley.

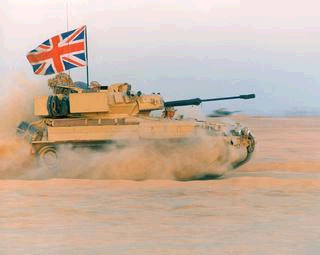
A British Scimitar in 2004

The future scout concept was conceived at a November 1995 meeting of senior armor officials. At this meeting, officials decided a future scout and main battle tank would be the centerpiece of the Army's armor modernization plan.

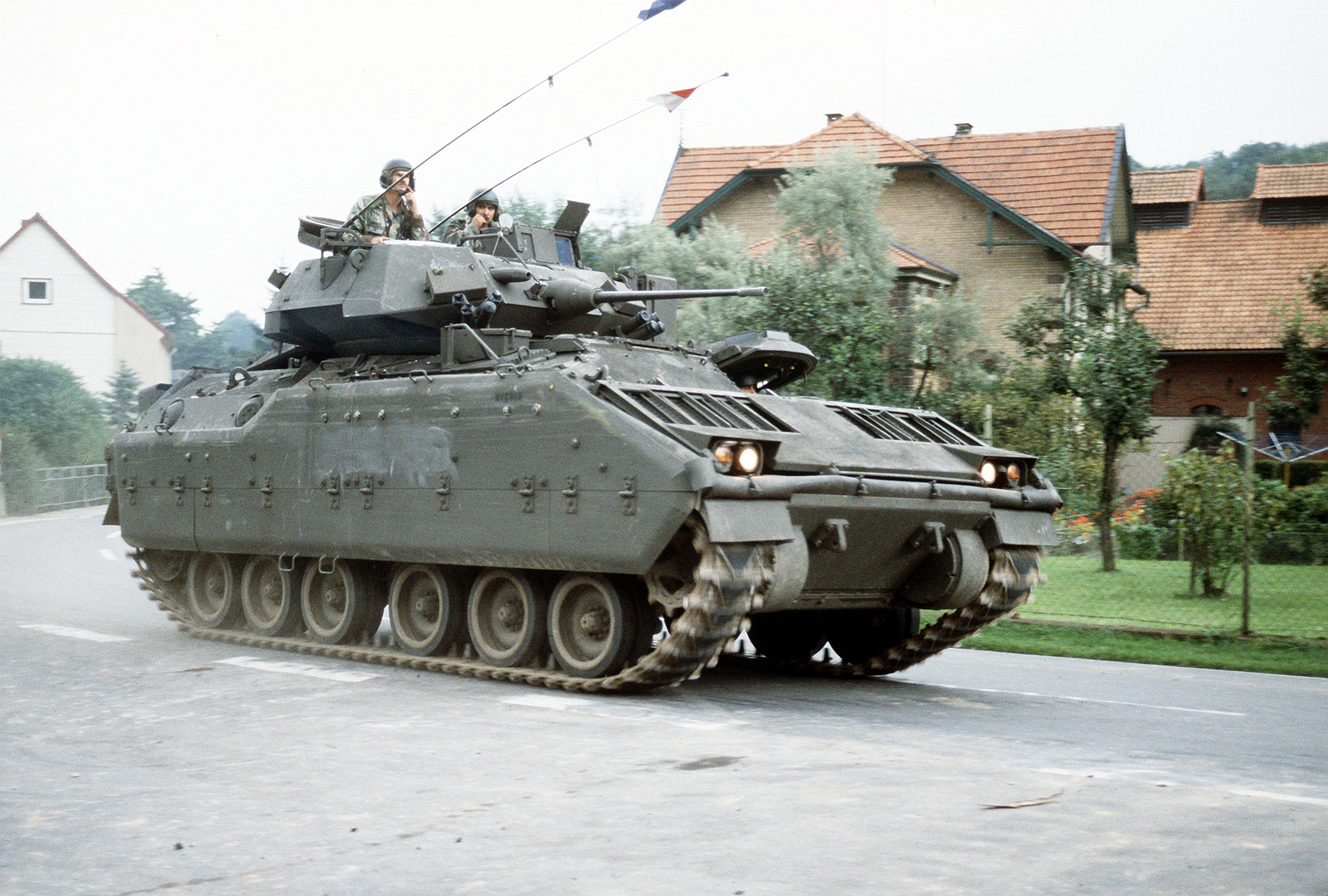
A U.S. Army M3 Bradley in 1985.

In March 1996, the Army Armor Center at Fort Knox recommended that the Army develop a future scout vehicle to be ready for production around 2004 to 2006. The Army considered the M8 Armored Gun System and the M113 as the basis for the chassis. The group projected that the future scout program would cost $1 billion. The Armor Center recommended that the Army forgo the M3A3 Bradley upgrade, and instead upgrade 278 M3A2s with Operation Desert Storm fixes. The Armor Center concluded the Bradley was approaching its design limit and had many disadvantages as a scout—namely, it lacked stealth and its 25 mm cannon lacked "growth potential against future threats." The Armor Center also suggested the Army consider a joint project with the Marine Corps, which was drafting requirements for the Future Light Combat Vehicle.

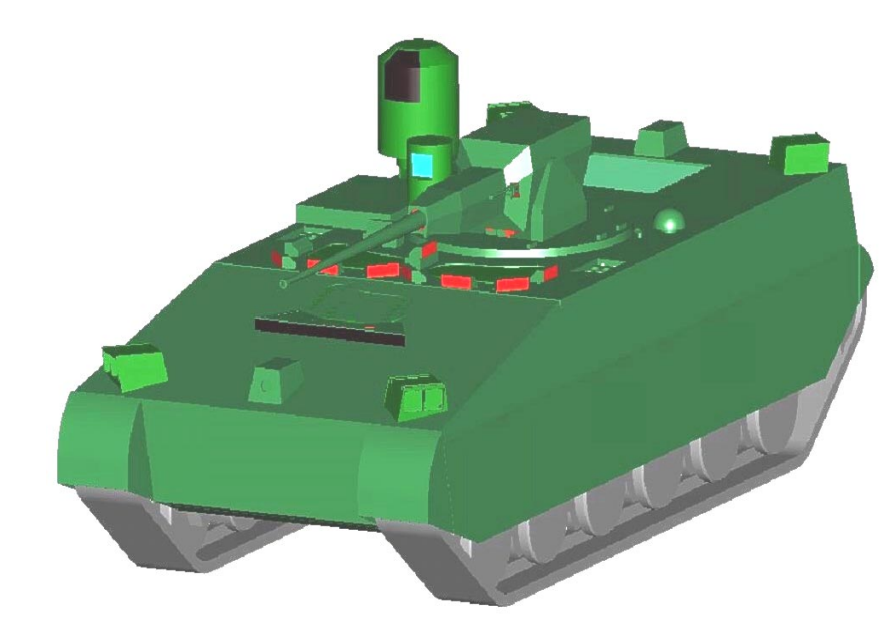
Notional model of Future Scout and Cavalry System

In October 1996 the U.S. and British armies signed a letter of intent to jointly work on a future scout vehicle. Developing the program with British cooperation was expected to save the U.S. Army 30 percent to 40 percent through the engineering and manufacturing development phase.

The UK was given contracting authority for phase one (called the project definition phase in the UK, and the advanced technology demonstration phase in the U.S.). Phase two (engineering and manufacturing development in the U.S. and full-scale development in the UK) would proceed with the phase one participants. One contractor would be downselected for low-rate production.

In November 1996, the U.S. Army updated its future scout mission need statement.

As of January 1998, the U.S. Army sought to acquire 1095 of the vehicles, and the British Army sought 235.

In January 1999, the UK awarded SIKA International (a joint venture of Lockheed Martin and BAE Systems) and LANCER (a consortium led by GEC Marconi), each a $147 million contract for the 42-month-long advanced technology demonstration (ATD) phase of the project.

== Cancelation ==
In a January 1999 report, an Office of the Secretary of Defense official called for a Defense Acquisition Board review of the FSCS program. The OSD official criticized the vehicle's proposed $3–5 million unit cost versus the $3.6 million M3A3 Bradley. The report said that while the Army mission need statement specified a lightly armored vehicle, the vehicle specified in the requirements was more like a "medium tank" comparable to the canceled M8 Armored Gun System.

In February, the U.S. Army began working with the UK to revise the requirements of the joint program to resolve the OSD's concerns. The new requirements, which went into effect in March, pacified the OSD. Many requirements were loosened at the OSD's request: for example, the new requirements clarified that the primary armament need not be an autocannon.

In October, U.S. Army Chief of Staff Eric Shinseki laid out his vision for a lighter, more transportable armored force. The Army launched the Interim Armored Vehicle acquisition program, and began investing in "leap-ahead" technologies for Shinseki's "objective force" Future Combat Systems Manned Ground Vehicles program.

In order to help pay for the IAV, the U.S. Army decided to terminate FSCS. In December 1999 the Army said it would end its participation in the joint program after the completion of the advanced technology demonstration (ATD) phase. At the time, the UK was still very much committed to its participation in the project. Congress, believing that continued development of the program was unnecessary given the Army's disinterest, deleted funding for completing the ATD phase. The Pentagon persuaded Congress to restore funding in October 2000.

In October 2001, the U.S. and British Army mutually canceled the program. The U.S. hoped to leverage the technologies developed with FSCS in the Future Combat Systems program. The British were expected to do the same with the Future Rapid Effect System.

== See also ==
- XM1201 reconnaissance and surveillance vehicle, FSCS heir in the American Future Combat Systems
- M1127 reconnaissance vehicle, a U.S. Army reconnaissance vehicle based on the Stryker
- MBT-70, joint West German–American main battle tank
