= M3A1 =

M3A1 may refer to:

- M3A1 Bradley, a variant of an American armored reconnaissance vehicle
- Stuart tank, an American light tank
- M3 Half-track, an American armored vehicle
- M3 submachine gun, an American submachine gun
- M3 Scout Car, an American armored car
