= AFAS =

AFAS may refer to:

- Advanced Field Artillery System, or XM2001 Crusader
- AFAS Software (nl:AFAS Software)
- AFAS Stadion, a Dutch stadium
