= XM1203 non-line-of-sight cannon =

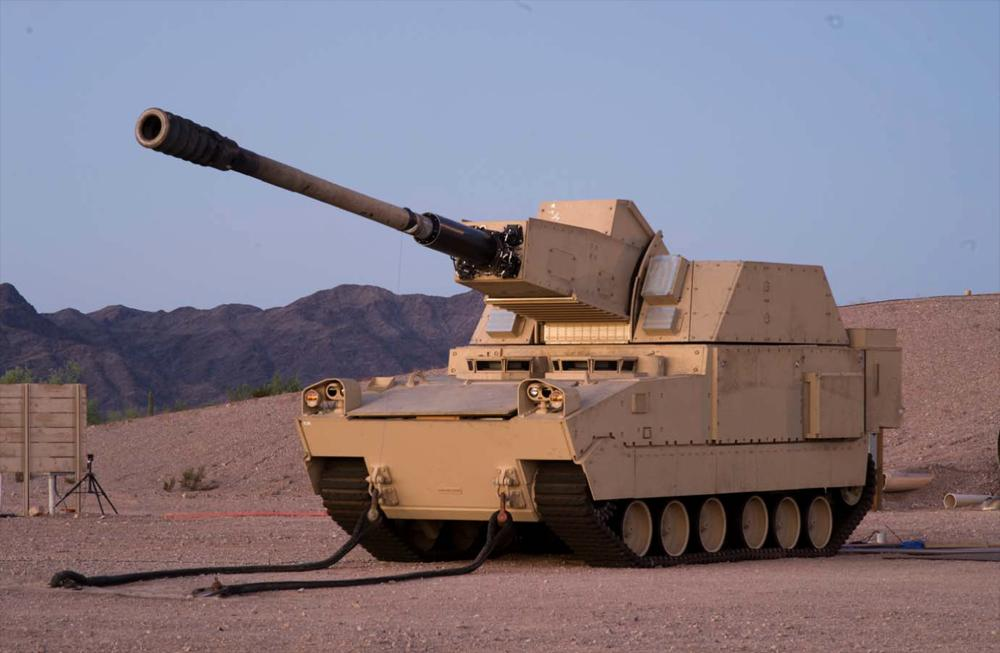
- Prototype 1 of the NLOS-C in 2009
- Type: Self-propelled artillery
- Place of origin: United States

Specifications
- Mass: 18+ tons
- Crew: 2
- Armor: Composite
- Main armament: 155 mm cannon
- Engine: Detroit Diesel 5L890

The XM1203 non-line-of-sight cannon (NLOS-C) was a 155 mm self-propelled howitzer. It was the lead vehicle for the U.S. Army's Future Combat Systems Manned Ground Vehicles program.

The NLOS-C was a replacement for the M109 howitzer, but cancelled in December 2009. The NLOS-C used technology from the XM2001 Crusader, a U.S. Army self-propelled howitzer canceled in 2002.

The NLOS-C program was originally intended to provide networked, extended-range targeting, and precision attack of point and area targets in support of other combat units with a suite of munitions that included special purpose capabilities. The NLOS-C was intended to provide sustained fire for close support and destructive fire for tactical standoff engagement.

The NLOS-C was to provide responsive fire in support of the FCS combined arms battalions, and their subordinate units. It would have operated with line-of-sight, beyond-line-of-sight, non-line-of-sight (NLOS), external, and non-Army (joint warfare) capabilities.

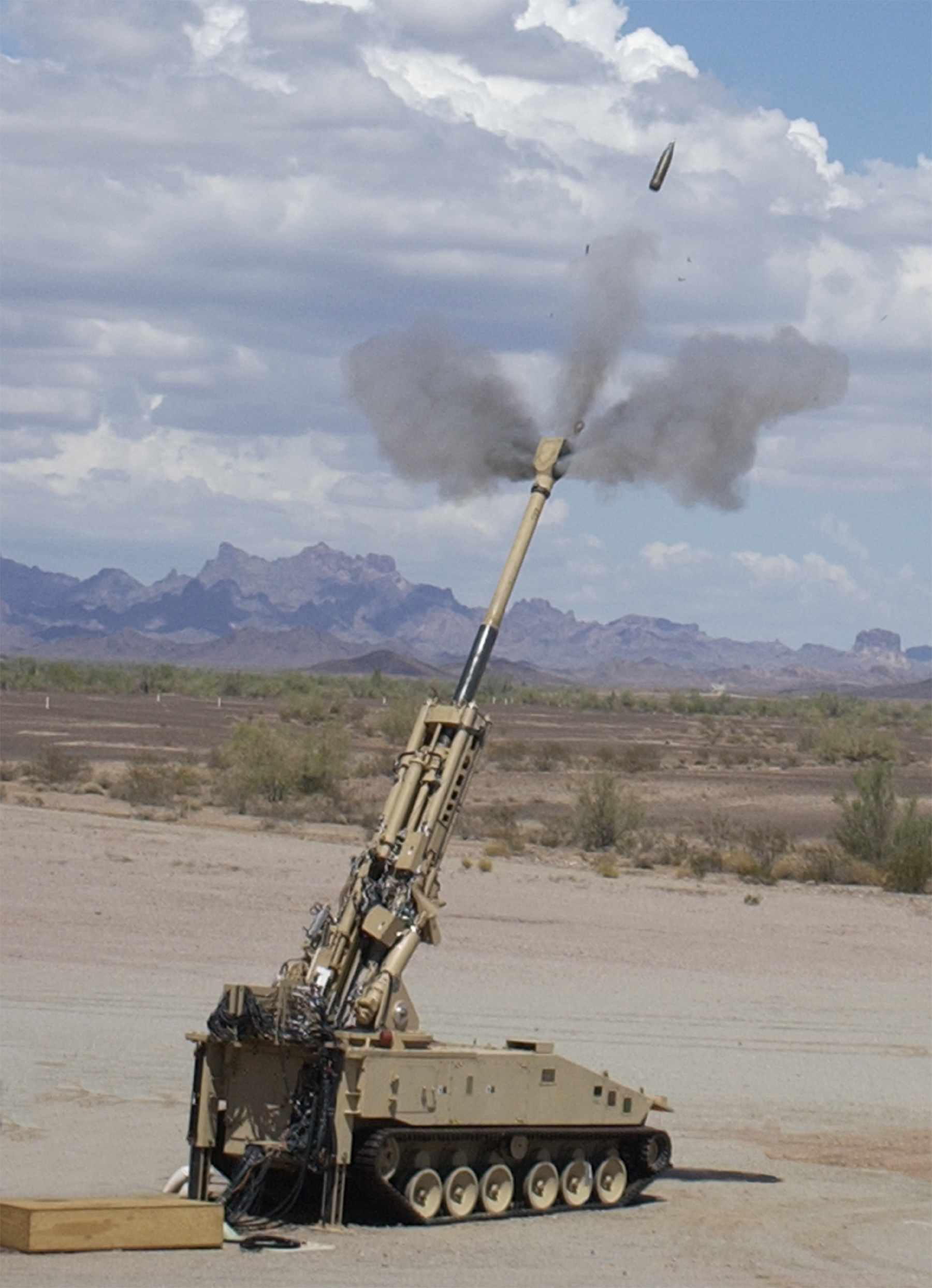
The United Defense NLOS-C demonstrator in 2003

The system, as proposed, looked to add capabilities that the M109 did not offer. One of the proposed systems advantages was the ability to switch shell types quickly on a one-by-one basis allowing an illumination round to be followed by a point-detonation round, to be followed by an area effect round. This would have given the system the ability to fire different rounds as required by different fire calls or to change types of shells. For instance, destroying a building then engaging anyone fleeing the area with the next round.

The rate of fire in the proposed system would have enabled more rounds to be fired in a given amount of time, allowing more firepower per system than available with the current M109 system. Another capability offered by the NLOS Cannon was multiple rounds simultaneous impact (MRSI) where the cannon fires a sequence of several rounds at different trajectories such that the rounds all hit the same target at the same time, resulting in little or no reaction time for the enemy to adjust its position. This was accomplished by including the autoloader from the Crusader project which achieved the goals of a much improved fire rate with a reduction in required crew.

The proposed system was envisioned as part of a fast mobile force networked via improved communications and data capabilities to allow rapid response with enhanced accuracy with the view to reducing friendly fire incidents along with lessened collateral damage, while providing superior protective artillery fire to units requiring gunfire support. Navigation of the vehicle and targeting information were provided via GPS and networked information systems.

Improvements in the refueling arrangements and automation of ammunition reloading reduced the amount of time spent on resupply and during which the gun would be unavailable for combat support. This also allowed the system to use a crew of two instead of five.

The NLOS-C was among the heaviest of the eight MGV variants. In June 2003, the NLOS-C was projected to weigh 25.3 tons at essential combat capability and 29.2 tons at full combat capability.

The NLOS-C had especially high commonality with the NLOS-Mortar vehicle.

== History ==
BAE Systems developed a concept technology demonstrator test bed with an M777 howitzer 155 mm gun tube. BAE completed testing of the demonstrator in early 2006.

In May 2008, BAE revealed the first NLOS-C prototype. Prototype 1 made its first public appearance on the National Mall, in Washington in June 2008. Eight prototypes were delivered to the U.S. Army's Yuma Proving Ground in Arizona by 2009. BAE produced five prototypes.

In April 2009 Defense Secretary Robert Gates recommended that the MGV program be terminated. Congress had directed that the Army continue working on the NLOS-C as a separate initiative. In December, Defense acquisition chief Under Secretary of Defense for Acquisition, Technology, and Logistics, Ashton Carter directed the Army to cancel the program. Carter directed the Army to begin work on the Paladin Improvement Program (M109A7). The electric rammer from the NLOS-C and some of the electric drives were integrated into the M109A7.

== See also ==
- M1299 howitzer, U.S. self-propelled howitzer based on the M109A7 canceled in 2024
- XM2001 Crusader, U.S. self-propelled howitzer canceled in 2002

== Sources ==
- Pernin, Christopher; Axelband, Elliot; Drezner, Jeffrey; Dille, Brian; Gordon IV, John; Held, Bruce; McMahon, Scott; Perry, Walter; Rizzi, Christopher; Shah, Akhil; Wilson, Peter; Sollinger, Sollinger (2012). Lessons from the Army's Future Combat Systems Program (PDF) (Report). RAND Corporation. Archived (PDF) from the original on March 25, 2020 – via Defense Technical Information Center.
