= United Defense =

American defense contractor

United Defense Industries
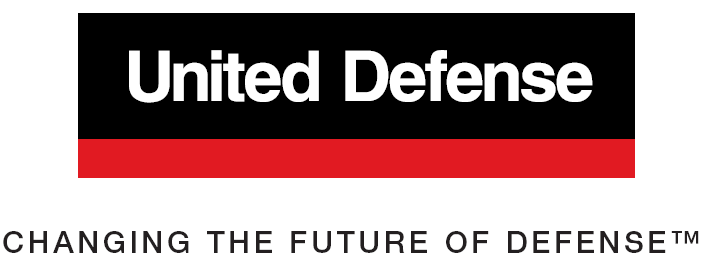
- Founded: January 1994; 32 years ago
- Defunct: June 24, 2005
- Fate: Acquired by BAE Systems
- Successor: BAE Systems Land & Armaments
- Headquarters: Arlington, Virginia, US

United Defense Industries (UDI) was an American defense contractor which became part of BAE Systems Land & Armaments after being acquired by BAE Systems in 2005. The company produced combat vehicles, artillery, naval guns, missile launchers and precision munitions.

== History ==
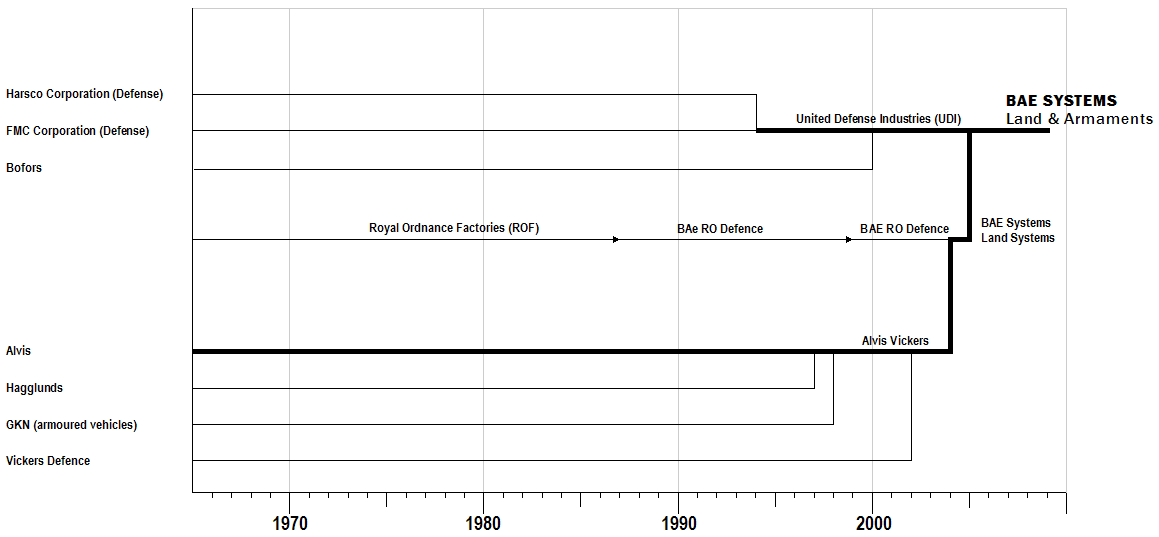
Evolution of the BAE Systems Land and Armaments division

The company started as a division of the agricultural machine business, Food Machinery Corporation (FMC), when they won a US Federal Government contract to build the Landing Vehicle Tracked (LVT) and became a weapon manufacturer during World War II. In 1964, FMC broadened their defense business by purchasing Northern Ordnance Company (formerly Northern Pump Company) in Fridley, Minnesota which specialized in Naval shipboard guns and missile launchers.

Bowen McLaughlin York (BMY), which became the BMY division of Harsco Corporation, was a separate business involving design and manufacture of various combat vehicles and other defense hardware. Following a massive decline in orders for tracked combat vehicles between 1983 and 1994, FMC and the Harsco Corporation agreed in January 1994 to combine their defense businesses to form United Defense. The new company owned the former FMC California-based Ground Systems Division, the former FMC Minnesota-based Armament Systems Division and Harsco's Pennsylvania-based BMY Combat Systems Division. The new company restructured its operations to concentrate final assembly and testing of combat vehicles to Pennsylvania.

In September 2000, UDI purchased Bofors Weapon Systems AB of Sweden, subsequently renamed Bofors Defence.

In 1997 UDI was subject to a takeover bids by rival General Dynamics and The Carlyle Group. It chose the lowest bid from private equity firm The Carlyle Group, which floated the company in 2001 but retained a share of the company.

=== BAE Systems acquisition ===
On March 7, 2005 UK-based defence contractor BAE Systems announced it was to acquire UDI for US$3.974 billion (£2.1 billion). This followed expressions of interest from companies including Northrop Grumman.

BAE Systems' bid was referred to the Committee on Foreign Investment in the United States (CFIUS) to ensure there were no national security implications of the sale. The CFIUS granted approval of the deal in April 2005. BAE completed its acquisition of United Defense on June 24, 2005 and announced plans to merge the company with its existing land systems businesses to form BAE Systems Land and Armaments.

== Products ==
United Defense products included:

- Advanced Gun System (AGS) for next generation United States Navy surface combatants
- Future Combat Systems Manned Ground Vehicles family of light armored ground vehicles
- M2 Bradley Infantry Fighting Vehicle
- M3 Bradley Cavalry fighting vehicle
- M8 Armored Gun System, U.S. Army light tank canceled in 1996
- M88 Hercules armored recovery vehicle
- M109 Paladin
- M113 family
- Mobile Tactical Vehicle Light, a vehicle based on the M113 proposed for the U.S. Army Interim Armored Vehicle program
- Crusader
- Mark 41 Vertical Launching System (VLS)
- 5-54 Mark 45 and 62 caliber lightweight naval gun
