= M3 Bradley =

American reconnaissance infantry fighting vehicle

M3 Bradley Cavalry Fighting Vehicle
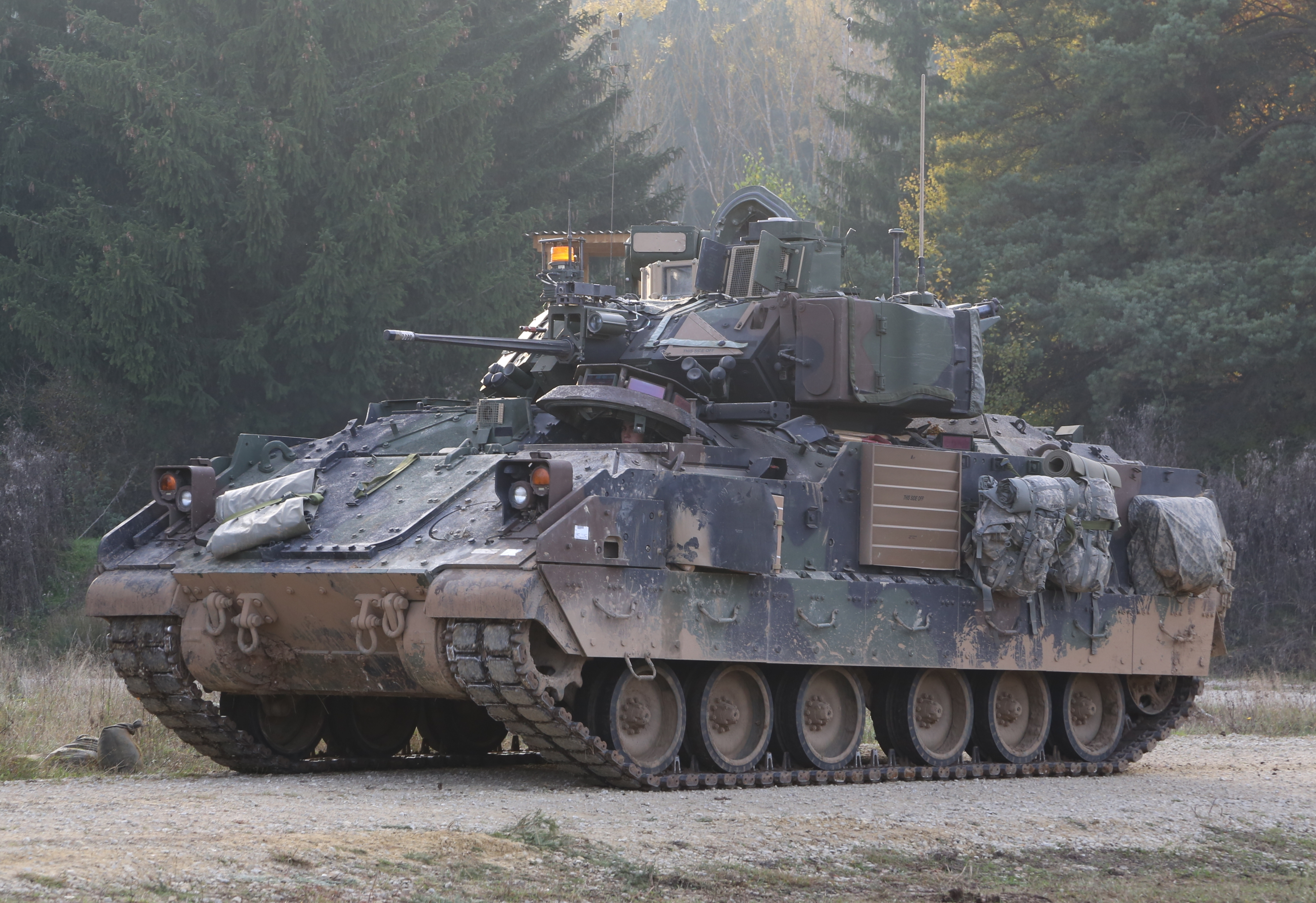
- A U.S. Army M3 Bradley in Germany in 2015
- Type: Reconnaissance infantry fighting vehicle
- Place of origin: United States

Service history
- Wars: Persian Gulf War; Iraq War; Russo-Ukrainian War; Russian invasion of Ukraine

Production history
- Designer: FMC Corporation (M3(A0), M3A1); United Defense (M3A2, M3A3)
- Manufacturer: United Defense (1981–1995); BAE Systems Platforms & Services (since 2004)
- Produced: 1981–1995 (United Defense); 2004–present (BAE Systems Platforms & Services)

Specifications
- Mass: 25–30.5 short tons (23–28 tonnes)
- Length: 21.2–21.5 ft (6.45–6.55 m)
- Width: 126–129 in (320–328 cm)
- Height: 117 in (297 cm)
- Crew: 5: Commander, Gunner, Driver, and two Scouts
- Armor: Steel, 5083 and 7039 aluminium
- Main armament: 25 mm M242 Chain Gun; 1500 rounds (300 ready); Dual TOW Anti-Tank Missile Launcher; 12 rounds (2 in launcher)
- Secondary armament: 7.62 mm M240C machine gun
- Engine: Cummins VTA-903
- Transmission: General Electric HMPT-500
- Ground clearance: 18 in (46 cm)
- Fuel capacity: 175–197 gal (662–746 L)
- Operational range: 250–300 mi (400–480 km), road
- Maximum speed: 35–41 mph (56–66 km/h), road 4–4.5 mph (6.4–7.2 km/h), water

The M3 Bradley Cavalry Fighting Vehicle (CFV) is an American tracked armored reconnaissance vehicle manufactured by BAE Systems Platforms & Services (formerly United Defense). A member of the Bradley Fighting Vehicle family, the M3 CFV is used by heavy armored cavalry units in the United States Army.

== History ==
The M3 Bradley CFV is very similar to the M2 Bradley IFV (infantry fighting vehicle) and is fielded with the same two-man 25 mm Bushmaster cannon turret with a coaxial M240C 7.62 mm machine gun. It only varies from the M2 in a few subtle ways and by role. The M3 is classified as an armored reconnaissance and scout vehicle and does away with the firing ports found in the M2 series. The M3 also carries more TOW missiles as well as more ammunition for its 25-mm and 7.62-mm guns.

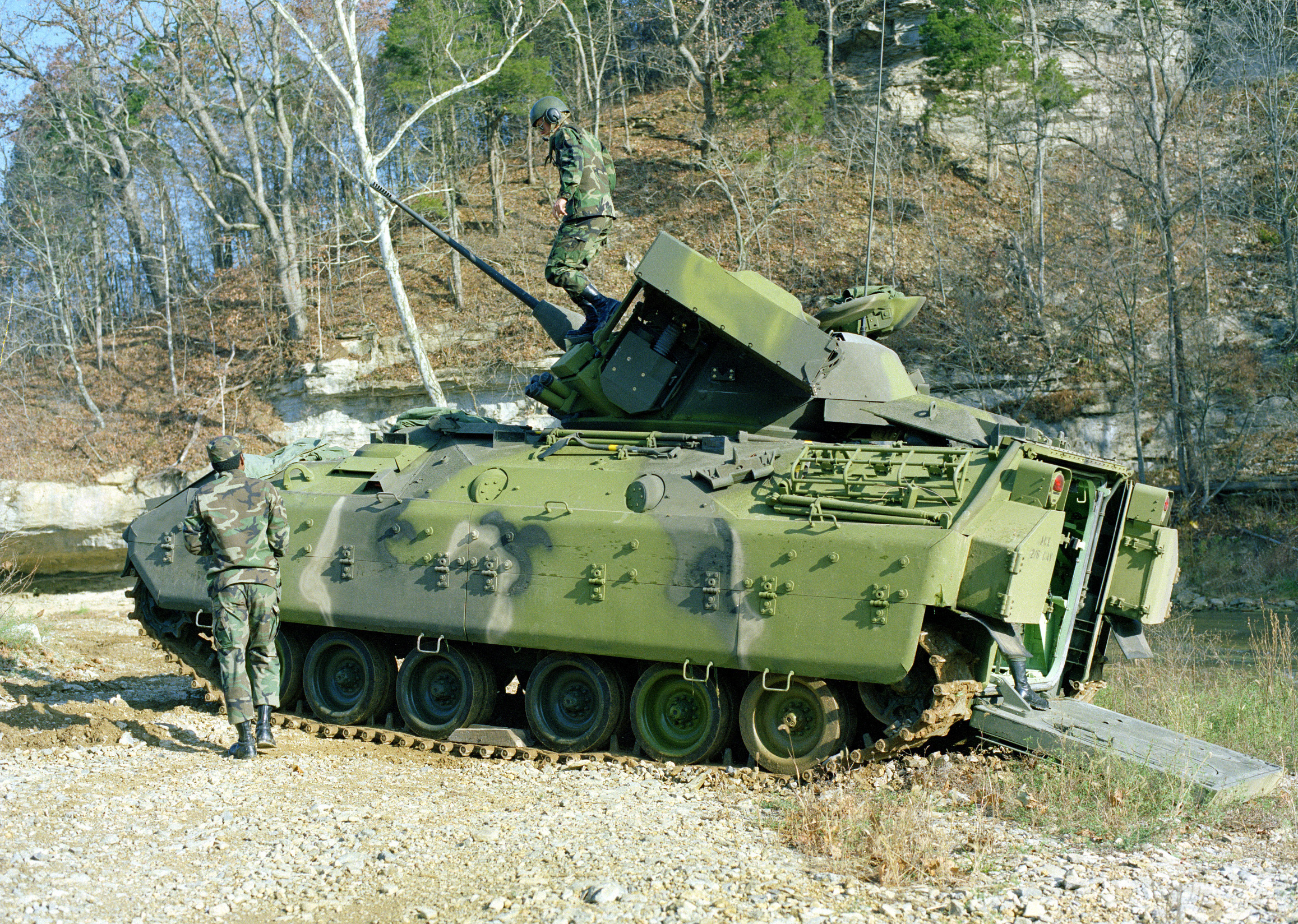
The M3 Bradley cavalry fighting vehicle in its original configuration in 1983. The vehicle is wearing the MERDC "Summer Verdant" camouflage scheme which was replaced by a 3-color standard woodland NATO pattern in the mid-1980s.

The Bradley family as a whole was originally intended to support the M113 armored personnel carrier (APC), but ended up replacing it in U.S. Army service altogether. Today, the Bradley is fielded in conjunction with the M1 Abrams series of main battle tanks and often accompanies infantry squads into combat. In the 1991 Persian Gulf War, Bradleys destroyed more enemy armored vehicles than the M1 Abrams. Only three Bradleys were lost to enemy fire; however, at least 17 were lost to friendly fire. Improvements to the Bradley family have included enhanced identification features, as well as anti-tank missile countermeasures (for first generation wire-guided missiles only) and improved armor protection in the form of ERA.

=== Replacement ===
The United States and United Kingdom worked jointly on the Future Scout and Cavalry System/TRACER in the 1990s. The U.S. Army's intended replacement for the M3 Bradley and up-armored Humvee reached the engineering and manufacturing development phase. It reached the engineering and manufacturing development phase before both partners terminated their involvement in October 2001 to pursue other more urgent programs: the U.S. Interim Armored Vehicle and the UK Future Rapid Effect System.

From 2003 Future Combat Systems (FCS) planned a successor to the M3 Bradley in the XM1201 Reconnaissance and Surveillance Vehicle. That too was canceled when FCS was terminated in 2009.

The U.S. Army intended the Ground Combat Vehicle to replace the M2 Bradley and M113 by 2018, while the M3 Bradley could later be replaced by future variants of the GCV. The GCV project was cancelled in 2014.

== Design ==
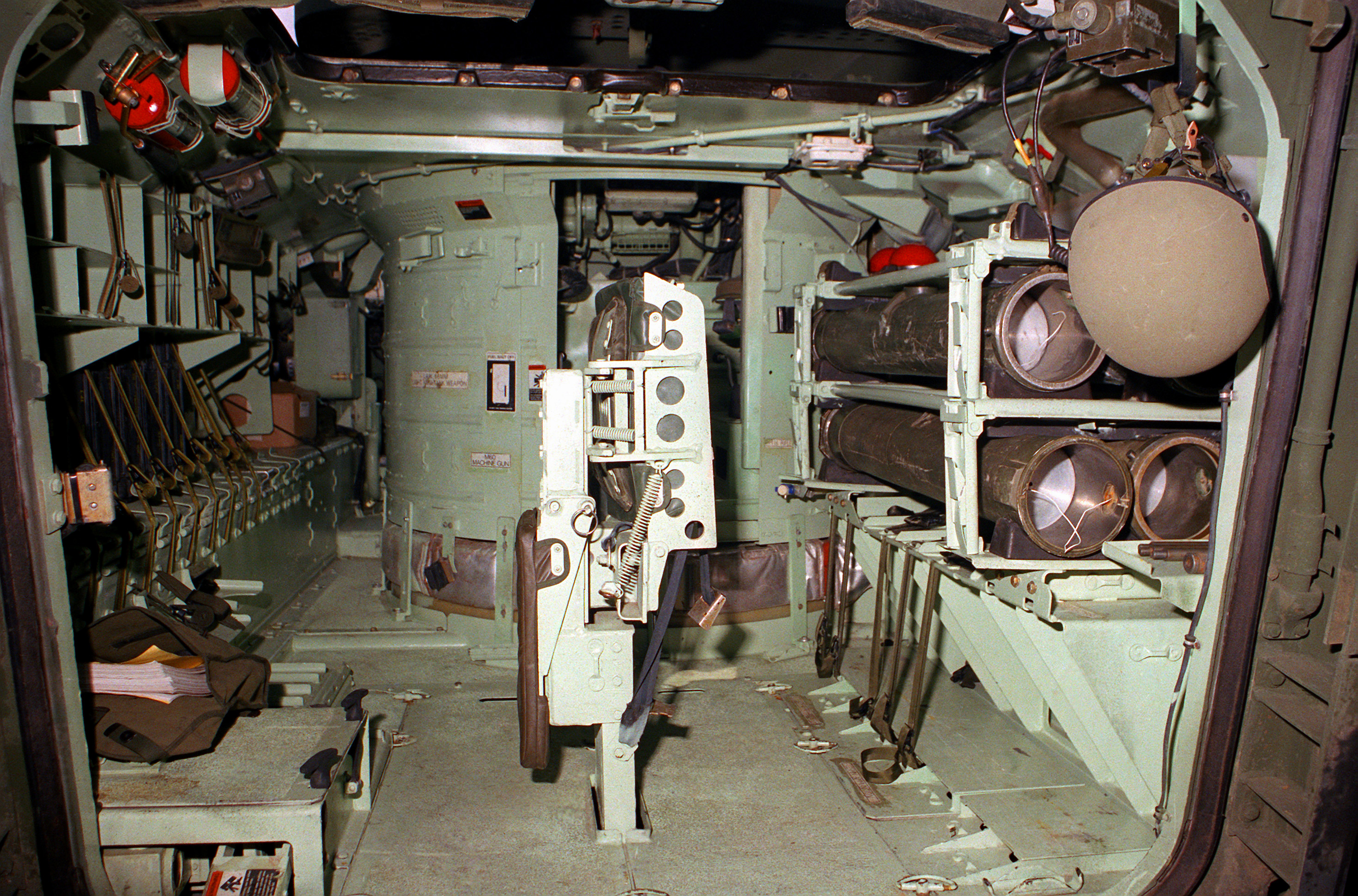
The troop compartment of the M3 Bradley CFV. Note the additional TOW ammunition in storage racks on the right side which replaced a row of benches for mounted infantry.

=== Concealment ===
All versions are equipped with two four-barreled M257 Grenade Launchers on the front of the turret for creating defensive smoke screens, chaff, and flares. It is also fitted with an engine smoke-generating system.

=== Armor ===
Armor for the hull and turret for all variants is steel, 5083 aluminum, and unique to the turret is 7039 aluminum.

=== NBC ===
The M3A1 variant introduced a gas particulate filter system.

=== Damage control ===
The M3A1 variant introduced a fire suppression system.

=== Mobility ===
The Bradley is highly capable in cross-country open terrain, in accordance with one of the main design objectives of keeping pace with the M1 Abrams. Whereas the M113 would float without much preparation, the Bradley was initially designed to float by deploying a flotation curtain around the vehicle. This caused some drownings due to failures during its first trials. Armor upgrades have negated this capability. The M3 Bradley was originally developed to accommodate a scout motorcycle. The idea was abandoned when it became apparent that the cycle's unprotected fuel tank could be hazardous to crew members.

== Variants ==
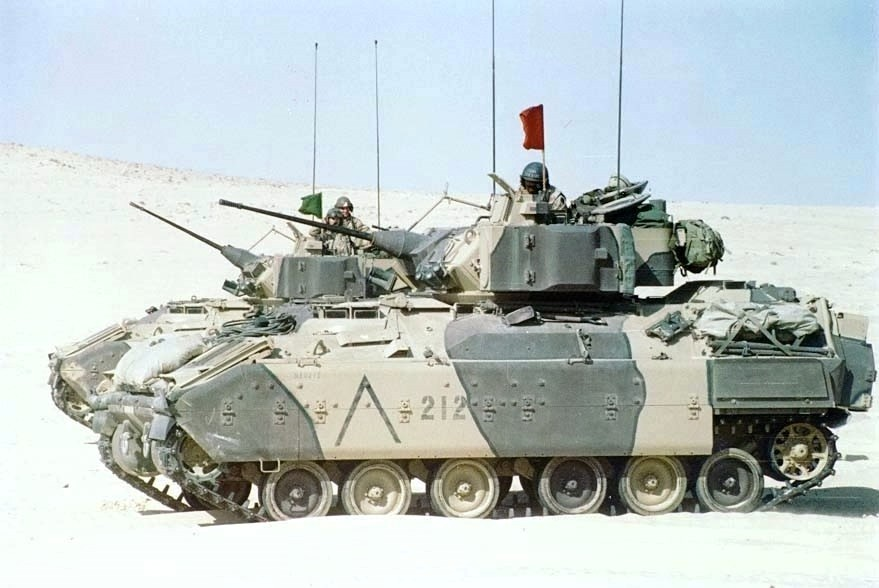
Two M3 Bradleys in Operation Desert Shield

=== M3(A0) ===
This model is essentially a re-stowed M2 Bradley. The passenger compartment was occupied by two troopers and more ammunition and missiles. Because it did not carry a squad, the firing ports were covered. The M3 retained the three periscopes between the cargo hatch and entry ramp and the periscopes along the left side of the vehicle, while those on the right side were covered over as they would have been inaccessible due to the TOW missile stowage rack.

=== M3A1 ===
The M3A1 variant introduced a gas particulate filter system for NBC threats. Unlike the M2A1 Bradley, the NBC masks were connected to the central filter for all five crewmen, instead of just the driver, gunner, and vehicle commander. This variant also introduced a fire suppression system. The three periscopes on the rear deck were omitted on the M3A1, and replaced by four periscopes in the cargo hatch itself.

=== M3A2 ===
The M3A2 incorporated enhanced armor upgrades, such as the ability to mount explosive reactive armor, from the M2A2 Bradley. After live fire testing, seating and ammunition stowage arrangements were also changed, with the observers moved to a bench on the left side of the vehicle and the missile stowage rearranged to enhance safety. After the Gulf War, other improvements including an eye-safe carbon dioxide laser rangefinder, global positioning system and compass, missile countermeasure device, combat identification system, and thermal viewer for the driver were incorporated into the M3A2-ODS.

=== M3A3 ===
The M3A3 model of the Bradley uses enhanced information and communication equipment, a central processing unit, and information displays for the vehicle commander and squad leader. The M3A3 is compatible with the inter-vehicular communication system of the M1A2 Abrams tank and AH-64D Apache Longbow helicopter. The commander has an independent thermal viewer and a new integrated sight unit called the Improved Bradley Acquisition System (IBAS), which allows automatic gun adjustments, automatic boresighting, and tracking of dual targets. The roof is reinforced with titanium armor. Many M3A3s were converted from M3A2s.

=== M3A4 ===
The M3A4 model of the Bradley is fitted with a new 675 horsepower (503 kW) engine. Electronic systems have been improved. Deliveries of upgraded vehicles commenced in 2020.

=== Table of variants ===
	M3 and M3A1	M3A2 and M3A2 Restow
Overall length	254 in (6.5 m)	258 in (6.6 m)
Overall width	126 in (3.2 m)	129 in (3.3 m), w/o armor kit
Height over commander's hatch	117 in (3.0 m)	
Ground clearance	18 in (45.7 cm)	
Top speed	41 mph (66 km/h)	35 mph (56 km/h)
Fording	Floats	
Max. grade	60%	
Max. trench	8.3 ft (2.5 m)	7 ft (2.1 m)
Max. wall	36 in (0.9 m)	30 in (0.8 m)
Range	300 mi (480 km)	250 mi (400 km)
Power	500 hp (370 kW) at 2600 rpm	600 hp (450 kW) at 2600 rpm
Power-to-weight ratio	20 hp/ST (16.4 kW/t), M3; 19.8 hp/ST (16.3 kW/t), M3A1	20 hp/ST (16.4 kW/t), w/o armor kit
Torque	1,025 lb⋅ft (1,390 N⋅m) at 2350 rpm	1,225 lb⋅ft (1,660 N⋅m) at 2300 rpm
Weight, combat loaded	49,900 lb (22,630 kg), M3; 50,500 lb (22,910 kg), M3A1	60,000 lb (27,220 kg), w/o armor kit)
Ground pressure	7.7 psi (53 kPa), M3; 7.8 psi (54 kPa), M3A1	9.3 psi (64 kPa)
Main armament	25 mm M242 Bushmaster chain gun BGM-71 TOW anti-tank missile	
Elevation, main gun	+59° −9°, M2 +57° −9°, M2A1	+19.5° −9°
Traverse rate	6 seconds/360°	
Elevation rate, main gun	60°/second	
Main armament ammo	1500 rounds, 12 TOW or TOW 2, M3A1	
Firing rate	Single shot, 100, 200 rounds per minute	

== Operators ==
- United States: estimated 1,200 M3A2/A3 Bradley as of January 2025 (800 more M3 Bradley in storage).
- Croatia: estimated 89 M2A2 Bradley

== Sources ==
- Hunnicutt, R. P. (1999). Bradley: A History of American Fighting and Support Vehicles. Presidio Press. ISBN 978-0-89141-694-4.
