= XM2001 Crusader =

American 155 mm self propelled artillery project

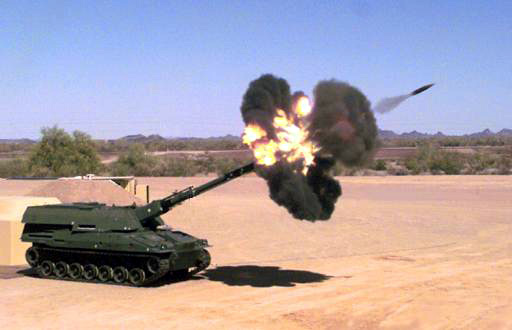
- XM2001 Crusader firing a shell
- Type: Self propelled artillery
- Place of origin: United States

Production history
- Manufacturer: United Defense

Specifications
- Mass: 39,000 kg (43 short tons)
- Length: 7.53 m (24.7 ft)
- Width: 3.31 m (10.9 ft)
- Height: 3.00 m (9.84 ft)
- Crew: 3 (commander, driver, gunner)
- Main armament: XM297E2 155 mm (6.1 in) cannon
- Engine: GE/Honeywell LV100-5 turbine engine 1,100 kW (1,500 hp)
- Suspension: Torsion bar
- Maximum speed: Cross country: 39–48 km/h (24–30 mph) / Road: 67 km/h (42 mph)

The XM2001 Crusader was to be the United States Army's next-generation self-propelled howitzer (SPH), designed to improve the survivability, lethality, mobility, and effectiveness of the artillery as well as the overall force. It was initially scheduled for fielding by 2008. United Defense was the prime contractor; General Dynamics the major subcontractor. In early May 2002, Secretary of Defense Donald Rumsfeld canceled the US$11 billion program because he considered it neither mobile nor precise enough. The prototype SPH vehicle is on display at the cannon park at Fort Sill.

== Inception ==
The Crusader was conceived as the Advanced Field Artillery System (AFAS), part of a family of vehicles built around a common chassis in the Armored Systems Modernization program. In October 1992, the Army canceled Armored Systems Modernization due to changing budgetary priorities caused by the collapse of the Soviet Union.

In 1994 AFAS was renamed "Crusader."

In 1996, the Crusader's experimental liquid propellant system was replaced by more traditional solid propellant bags. In 1997 the Government Accountability Office advised the Army to consider either upgrading the Paladin or to purchase the German Panzerhaubitze 2000 instead.

The Crusader was intended to replace the M109A6 Paladin self-propelled howitzer and the M992 Field Artillery Ammunition Support Vehicle (FAASV). It was intended to be an automated gun artillery system to support the Interim Brigade Combat Teams (IBCT) Counterattack Corps and a basis for other vehicle developments.

Key features of the Crusader design included:

- A cooled XM297E2 cannon for sustained high rates of fire
- Automated ammunition handling and loading
- Cockpit with embedded command and control
- Composite armor
- Survivability features to protect the vehicle and crew
- GE/Honeywell LV100-5 gas turbine engine to keep up with other fighting vehicles

The Army required that the Crusader was to share a common engine with the M1 Abrams. The principal driver for this change was to shed weight off the Crusader. Caterpillar Inc. proposed a diesel engine, as did a joint venture of General Dynamics and DaimlerChrysler. In September 2000, the Army selected Honeywell's LV 100 turbine engine. The Army was to procure as many as 3,600 of these, including 2,845 for the Abrams and 846 for the Crusader.

Using the same chassis, the resupply vehicles (RSVs) would deliver automatic, reciprocal transfer of ammunition, data and fuel to the SPH or another RSV.

=== Program timeline ===
- 1QFY95 Approved to commence program definition and risk reduction (PDRR) phase.
- 2QFY98 In-process review completed and manufacture of the PDRR prototype systems begun.
- 3QFY99 Delivery of first RSV prototype.
- 2QFY00 Delivery of first prototype howitzer SPH 1.
- 1QFY02 Successful preliminary design review.
- 1QFY02 More than 4000 rounds fired from SPH 1.
- 2QFY02 Program discontinued.

== Specifications ==
	SPH	RSV-T (tracked)	RSV-W (wheeled)
Curb weight	40 tons	36 tons	33.3 tons
Length	7.53 m	7.53 m	11.03 m
Width	3.31 m	3.31 m	2.44 m
Height	3.00 m	3.00 m	3.59 m
Road mobility	67 km/h		
Cross-country mobility	39–48 km/h	39–48 km/h	64 km/h
Armament	Cooled 155 mm	none	none
Maximum range	Over 40 km		
Rate of fire/resupply	10-12 rounds/min	48 rounds in 10 min	48 rounds in 10 min
Crew	3	3	3

== Cancellation ==
In October 1999, Army Chief of Staff Eric Shinseki outlined a future that envisioned transforming heavy brigades into lighter brigades outfitted with wheeled Interim Armored Vehicles, later renamed "Stryker." Shinseki said the priority of a lighter, more mobile army could shift resources from heavier armored vehicle acquisitions. The following month Shinseki said the vehicles were too heavy: the howitzer and its resupply vehicle would weigh a combined 110 tons, more than could be carried by any of the Air Force's aircraft, including the C-5 Galaxy if flight rules aren't waived. Shinseki spoke with contractor United Defense about bringing down the combined weight of the two vehicles by 20 tons, which United agreed was possible.

In April 2001, a panel convened by Secretary of Defense Donald Rumsfeld recommended canceling the Crusader and other defense modernization programs. An official involved called the Crusader "a wonderful system -- for a legacy world."

As of 2002, the Army planned to acquire 480 Crusaders at a program cost of $11 billion.

In February 2002, President George W. Bush allocated $475 million for the Crusader program in the White House's 2003 budget proposal, which also proposed increased Pentagon spending by $48 billion.

In April, Defense Secretary Rumsfeld, whose concerns about defense modernization overspending had intensified, met with Pentagon officials including Army Secretary Thomas E. White to discuss defense spending cuts to free funding for more essential modernization programs. The officials discussed cuts to the Crusader, RAH-66 Comanche helicopter, and F-22 Raptor. Some officials questioned whether the howitzer was redundant given the parallel development of a lighter howitzer for the Future Combat Systems modernization effort.

On 9 May, Rumsfeld announced that he would ask Congress to cancel the $11 billion program. Days before, Congress members favorable to the Crusader received talking points from Army officials who sought to save the program. The last-minute lobbying prompted anger from Rumsfeld and an internal Army investigation into its congressional liaison office. The investigation culminated with the resignation of the Army official who had distributed the talking points. After being absolved himself of wrongdoing in the matter, Army Secretary White assured that he supported Rumsfeld's decision and said the Army was analyzing alternatives to the Crusader including the M982 Excalibur 155 mm guided artillery shell. The House Appropriations Committee responded, after rejecting a measure that would have sustained the program until the fall, asking the Pentagon to delay plans to cancel the Crusader. Later that month President Bush asked Congress to reallocate the Crusader's budget towards other Army developmental weapons including $310 million for Future Combat Systems in the proposed 2003 Pentagon budget.

== Similar vehicles ==
- 2S35 Koalitsiya-SV – (Russia)
- K9A2 Thunder – (South Korea)
- Type 99 – (Japan)

== See also ==
- Armored Systems Modernization, a wide-ranging U.S. Army combat vehicle acquisition program cancelled after the end of the Cold War
- XM1203 non-line-of-sight cannon, a U.S. Army self-propelled howitzer canceled in 2011 that was a part of the Future Combat Systems Manned Ground Vehicles program
- M1299, a U.S. Army replacement for the M109 howitzer cancelled in 2024
- M8 armored gun system, a U.S. Army light tank project cancelled in 1996
