= M88 recovery vehicle =

US Army tank repair and extraction vehicle

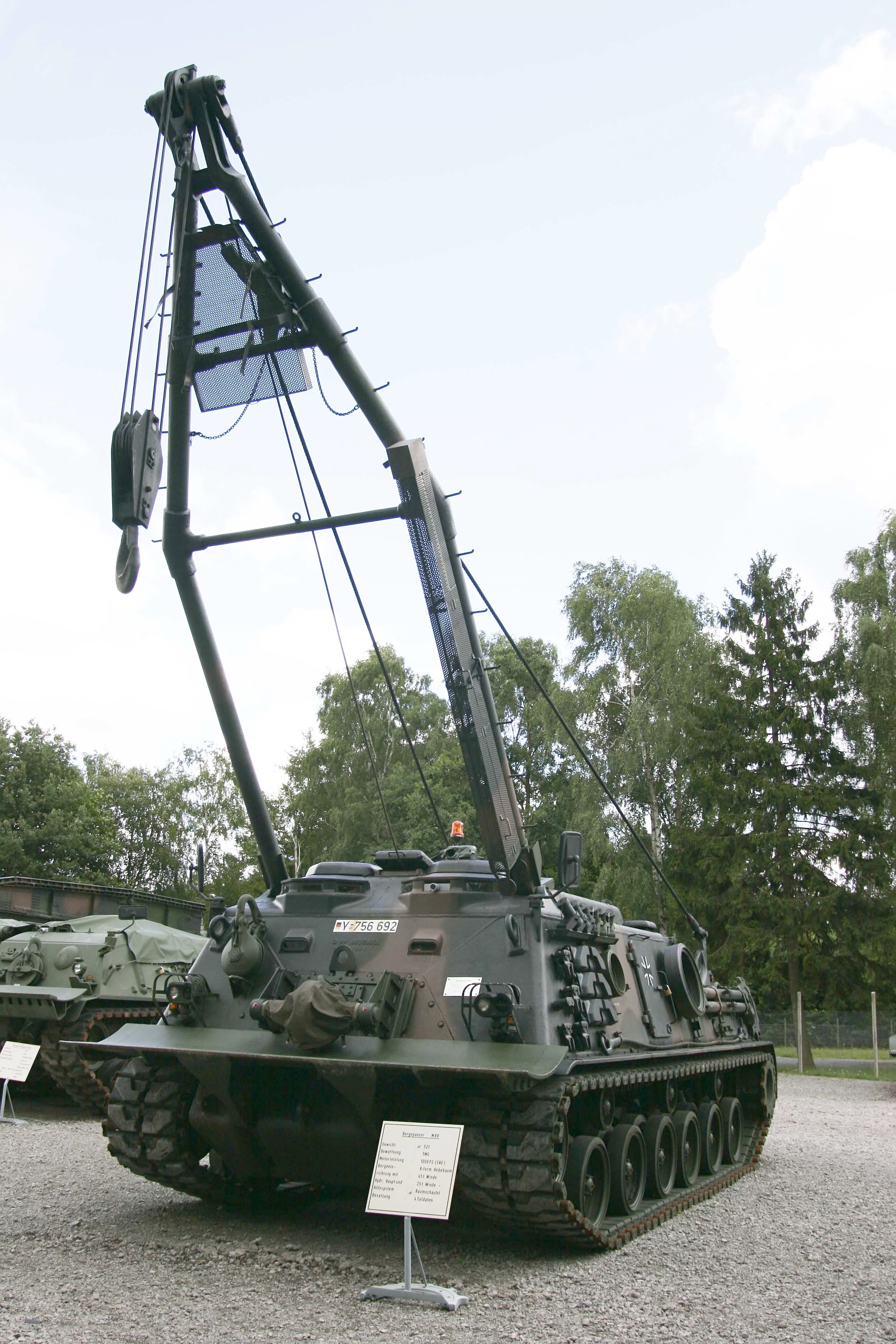
- An original baseline M88 (Bergepanzer 1) ARV of the German Army on static display at the German Tank Museum outside Munster, Germany
- Type: Armored recovery vehicle
- Place of origin: United States

Service history
- In service: 1961–present
- Used by: See operators
- Wars: Arab–Israeli conflict; Vietnam War; Lebanese Civil War; Persian Gulf War; Kosovo War; Iraq War; War in Afghanistan; Russo-Ukrainian War; 2023 Ukrainian counteroffensive; 2025 Cambodia-Thailand conflict

Production history
- Designer: Bowen McLaughlin York (BMY)
- Designed: 1959
- Manufacturer: BMY (1961–1994); United Defense and Anniston Army Depot (1994–2005); BAE Systems Land and Armaments (since 2005)
- Unit cost: US$2,050,000
- Produced: 1961–present
- No. built: 1,690 (all variants)
- Variants: See variants

Specifications
- Mass: M88/M88A1: 50.8 t (112,000 lb); M88A2: 63.5 t (140,000 lb)
- Length: 27.13 ft (8.27 m)
- Width: 11.25 ft (3.43 m)
- Height: 10.25 ft (3.12 m)
- Crew: 3
- Armor: Hull and cab armored to protect against small-arms fire up to 30 mm direct fire weapons
- Main armament: M2 .50 cal heavy MG with 1,300 rounds
- Engine: •M88/M88A1: Continental (now RENK America LLC, a wholly owned U.S. subsidiary of Renk) AVDS-1790-2DR V12, air-cooled Twin-turbo diesel engine •M88A2: Continental AVDS-1790-8CR, V12 air-cooled Twin-turbo diesel engine M88/M88A1: 750 hp (560 kW); M88A2: 1,050 hp (780 kW)
- Transmission: Twin Disc XT-1410-5A cross-drive (3 speed forward, 1 speed reverse)
- Suspension: Torsion bar suspension
- Ground clearance: 17 in (0.43 m)
- Operational range: M88/M88A1: 450 km (280 mi); M88A2: 322 km (200 mi)
- Maximum speed: M88/M88A1: 42 km/h (26 mph); M88A2: 48 km/h (30 mph)

The M88 recovery vehicle is one of the largest armored recovery vehicles (ARV) in use by United States Armed Forces. There are three variants, the M88, the M88A1, and the M88A2 HERCULES (Heavy Equipment Recovery Combat Utility Lifting Extraction System). The M88 series has seen action in the Vietnam War, the Persian Gulf War, the Iraq War, and the War in Afghanistan, and to a lesser extent during the Kosovo War, where they were deployed to help recover heavy armored vehicles of the Allied ground units. As of 2000, the M88A2 replacement cost was around US$2,050,000.

== History ==
=== Design ===
The M60 tank, produced from 1959, was heavier than the existing M74 armored recovery vehicle was able to retrieve. The design of a new ARV was based on the chassis and parts of the automotive component of the M48 Patton and M60 tanks. The original M88 was introduced in 1961, M88A1 in 1977, and the current M88A2 introduced in 1997.

=== Development ===
It was originally manufactured by Bowen McLaughlin York, later the BMY division of Harsco Corporation, in 1961. The company later merged with FMC Corp. to form the United Defense Industries in 1994. United was acquired by BAE Systems in 2005 to become BAE Systems Land and Armaments. In February 2008 BAE was awarded a $185 million contract modification from the U.S. Army to manufacture 90 Army-configured M88A2s, four United States Marine Corps-configured M88A2s and authorized spares list parts.

=== Role ===
The M88's primary role is to repair or replace damaged parts in fighting vehicles while under fire, as well as extricate vehicles that have become bogged down or entangled. The main winch on the M88A2 is capable of a 70-ton, single line recovery, and a 140-ton 2:1 recovery when used with the 140 ton pulley. The A-frame boom of the A2 can lift 35 tons when used in conjunction with the spade down. The spade can be used for light earth moving, and can be used to anchor the vehicle when using the main winch.

The M88 employs an Auxiliary power unit (APU) to provide auxiliary electrical and hydraulic power when the main engine is not in operation. It can be used to slave-start other vehicles, provide power for the hydraulic impact wrench, as well as a means to refuel or de-fuel vehicles as required. The M88 series of vehicles can refuel M1 tanks from its own fuel tanks, but this is a last resort due to the possibility of clogging the AGT-1500's fuel filters. The fuel pump draws fuel from the bottom of the fuel cell, and with it, all of the sediment that has accumulated with time.

== Variants ==
- M88 – 1961
- M88A1 – 1977
- M88A2 HERCULES – 1991
- M88A3 HERCULES – future

All variants have a 12.7 mm, M2 Browning (.50 caliber machine gun), 432 mm ground clearance, 2.6 m fording depth, 1.1 m wall climb and 2.6 m trench crossing capabilities. There has been no major deviation in battlefield role through the M88 series. The later models are merely able to lift heavier loads. The M88A1 was designed around the now obsolete M60 Patton tanks, so it was in light of the fact that two M88A1s were required to tow the new M1 Abrams tank that the decision was made to upgrade to the M88A2 in 1991.

The original M88 produced from 1960 to 1964 used the Continental AVSI-1790-6A gasoline engine. It had 980 hp (730 kW) at 2,800 rpm, as well as a 10 hp (7.5 kW) gasoline auxiliary power unit. The M88A1 was powered by the Continental AVDS-1790-2DR Diesel engine and had a 10 hp (7.5 kW) Diesel APU.

While the original M88 and M88A1 are designated as a "medium recovery vehicle", the M88A2 (original designation M88A1E1) is designated as "heavy recovery vehicle". They are all similar in many fundamental ways. The later version is distinctly heavier at 70 tons, compared to the original 56 tons, and uses a different engine, an AVDS 1790-8CR with 1,050 hp (780 kW), compared to a Continental AVDS-1790-2DR, with 750 hp (560 kW).

The M88A2 is slightly larger than its predecessors, at 8.6 × 3.7 × 3.2 m compared to 8.3 × 3.4 × 3.2 m. It has a lower top speed (40 km/h) and a significantly lower road range at 322 km, compared to the previous 450 km. There have been improvements in braking and steering. The M88A2 has upgraded armor protection including armored track skirts and applique armor panels, which both previous models lack. The later M88A1 and M88A2 models are equipped with nuclear, biological, chemical (NBC) defenses and a smoke screen generator. The required crew size has decreased from five to four to three through the series.

In February 2017, the Army awarded BAE Systems Land and Armaments a $28 million contract modification for the procurement of 11 M88A2 recovery vehicles.

The upgrades include a modernized powertrain that boosts horsepower and torque, a seventh road wheel for enhanced stability, and hydro-pneumatic suspension units that improve cross-country mobility and recovery operations. By increasing the towing capacity from 70 short tons (64 t) to 80 short tons (73 t), it eliminates the need for two vehicles for raising and moving the newer, heavier M1 Abrams tanks, effectively bridging the single-vehicle recovery gap.

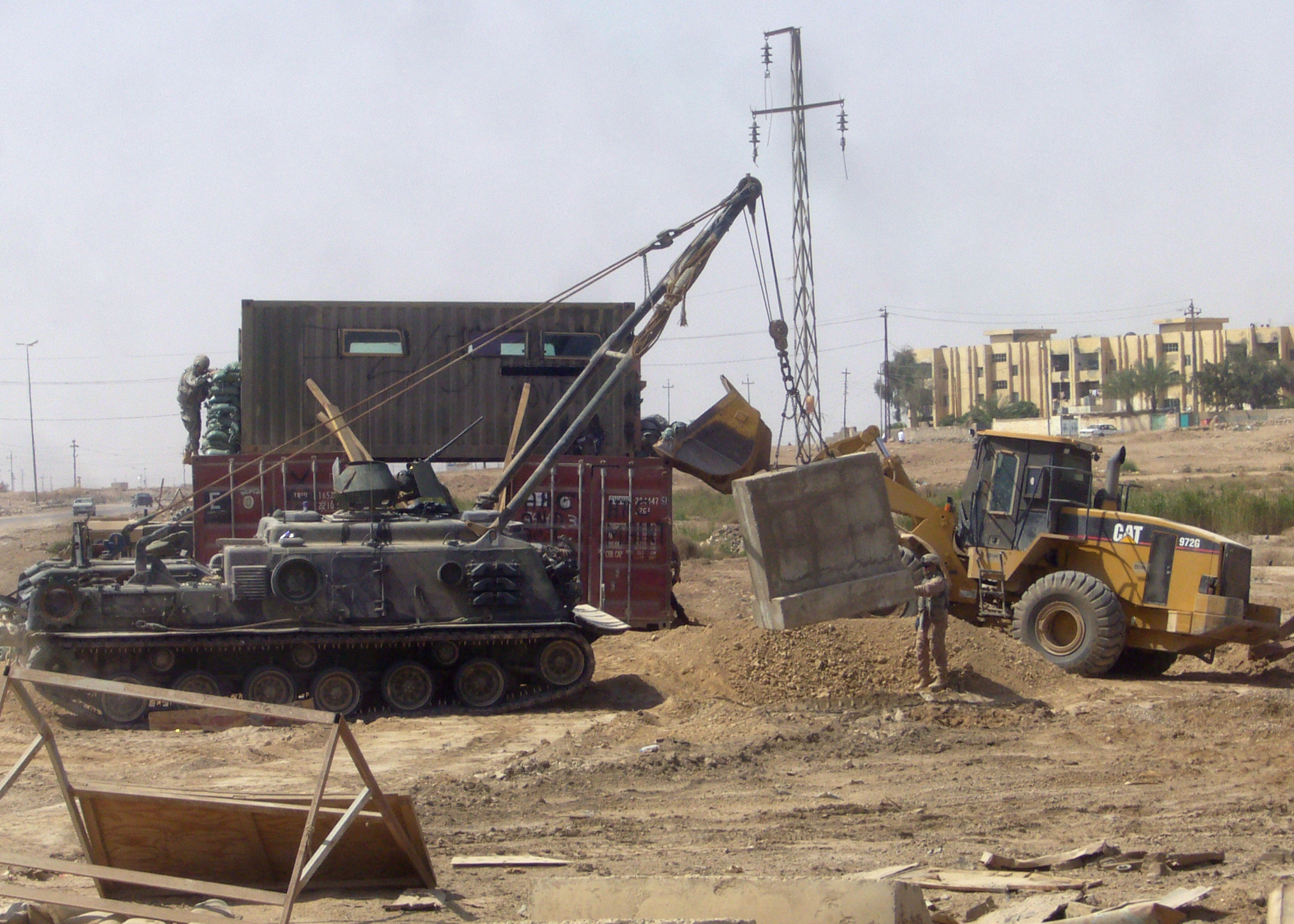
In Operation Iraqi Freedom, the M88 saw great use lifting and placing heavy concrete barriers during combat engineering missions.

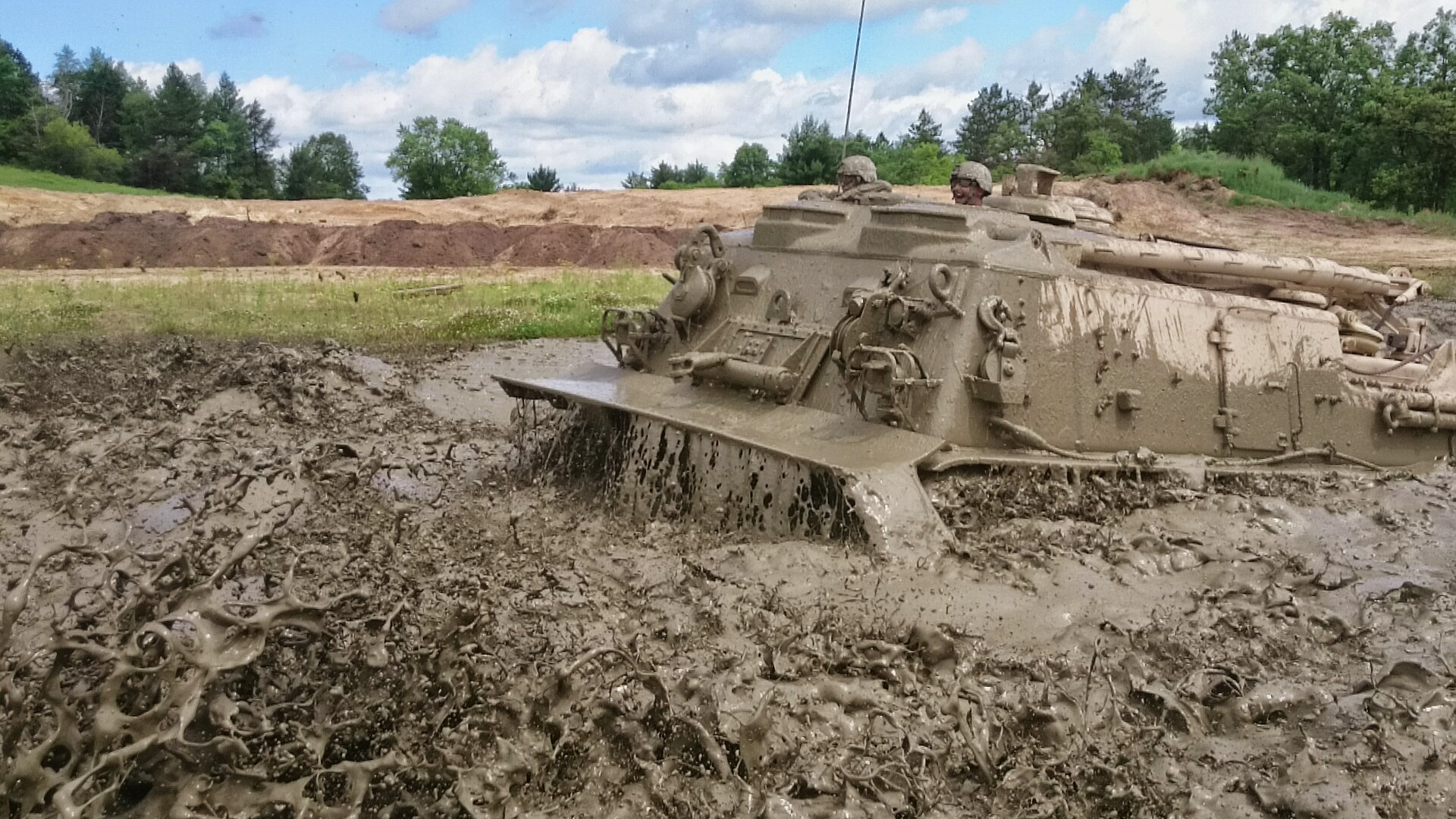
M88 recovery vehicle at recovery range in Fort McCoy, Wisconsin, 2015

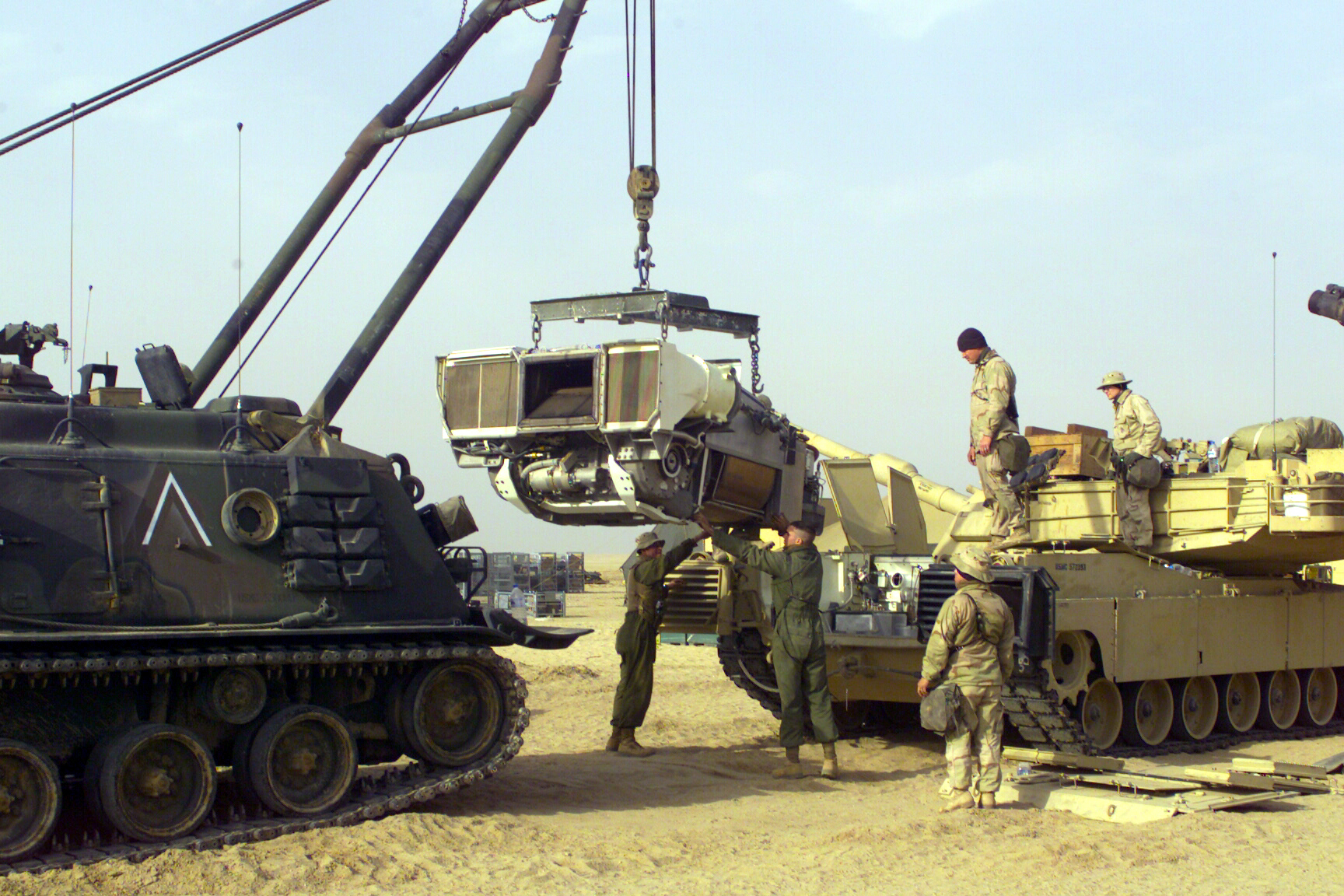
U.S. Marines use an M88A1 to load a Honeywell AGT1500 gas turbine engine back into an M1A1 Abrams at Camp Coyote, Kuwait, February 2003.

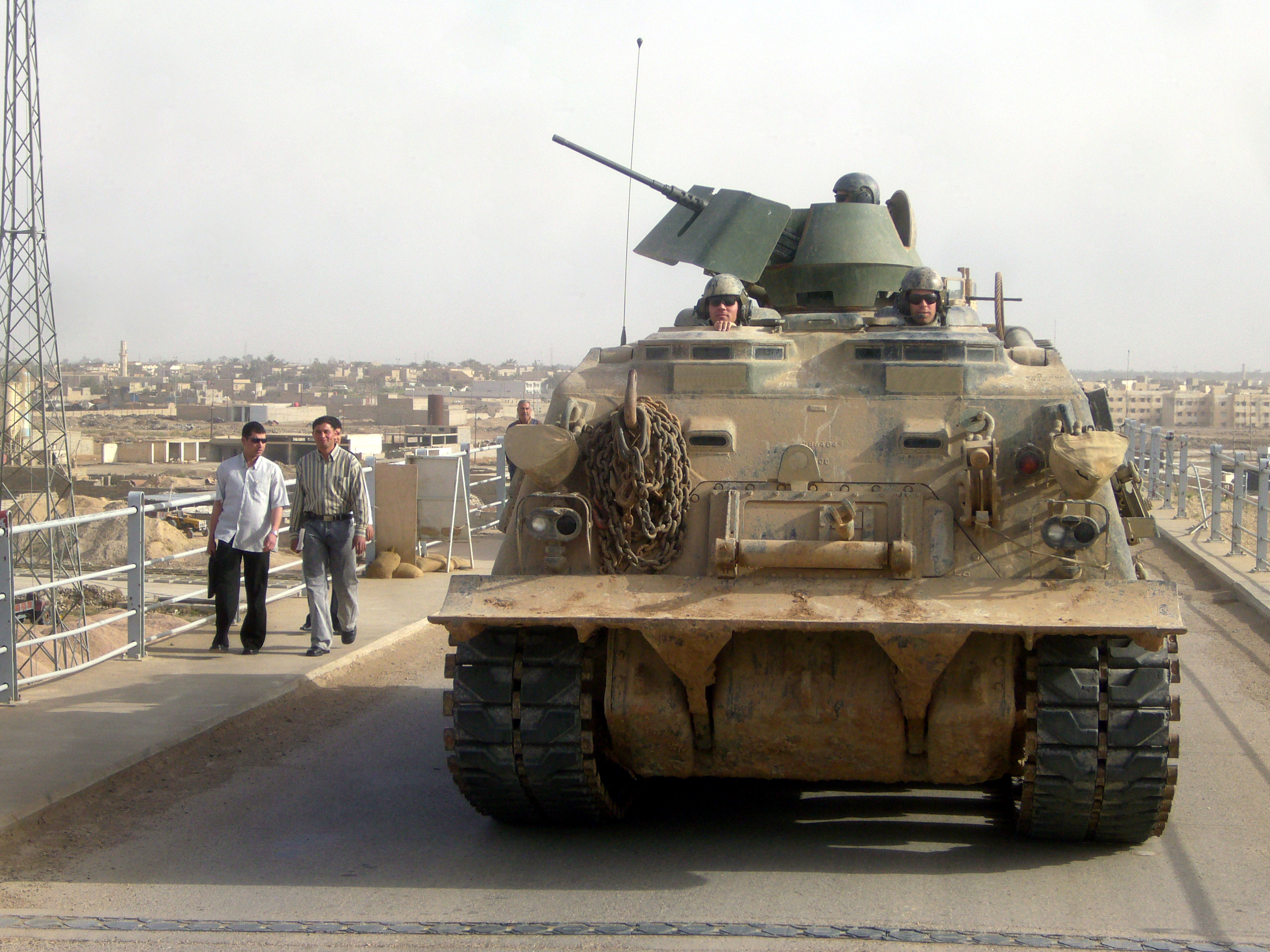
A U.S. M88A1 out on a mission in March 2007, during the Iraq War

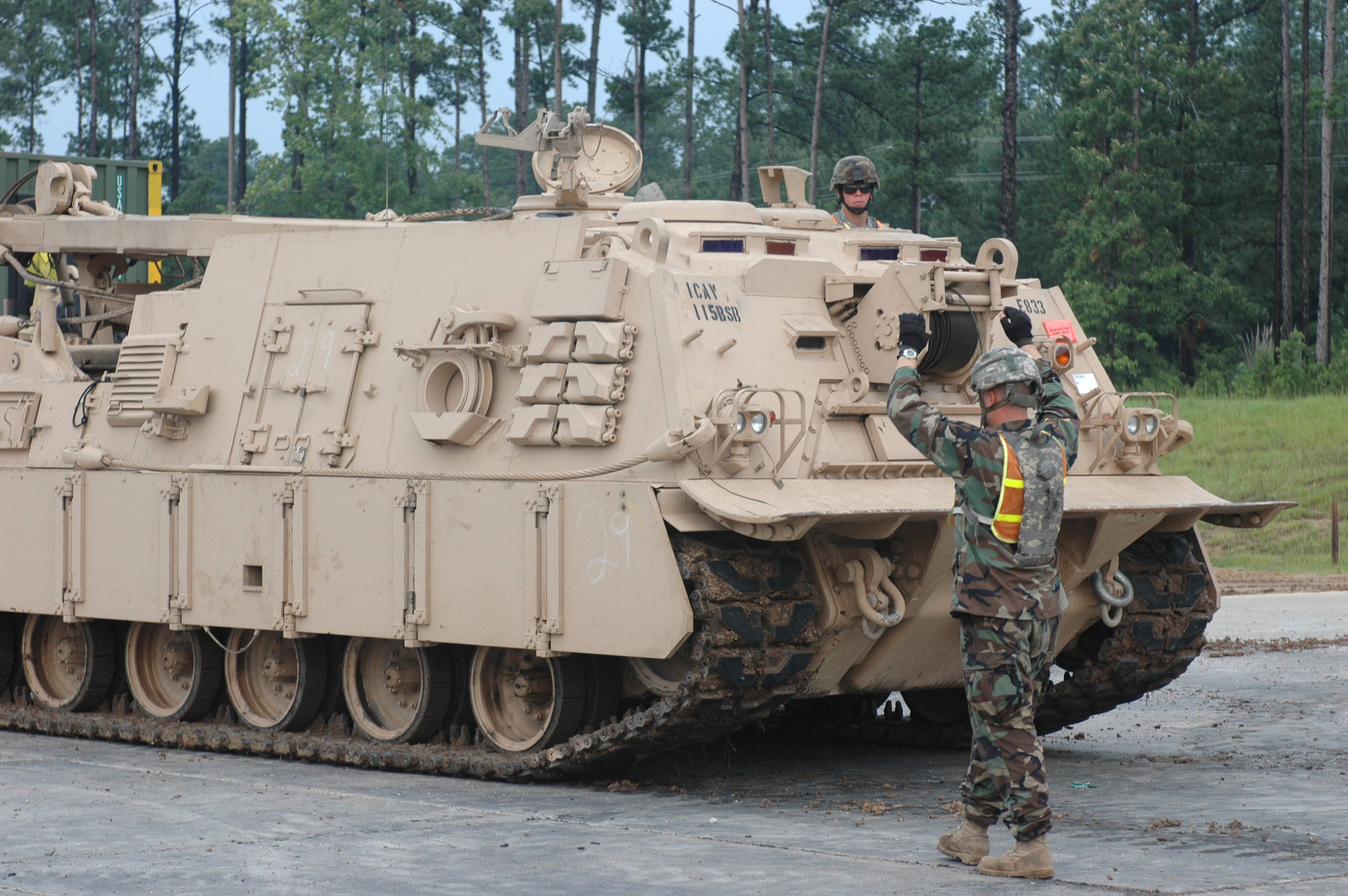
A U.S. Army M88A2 Hercules at a facility in Fort Polk, Louisiana, June 2006

== Criticism ==
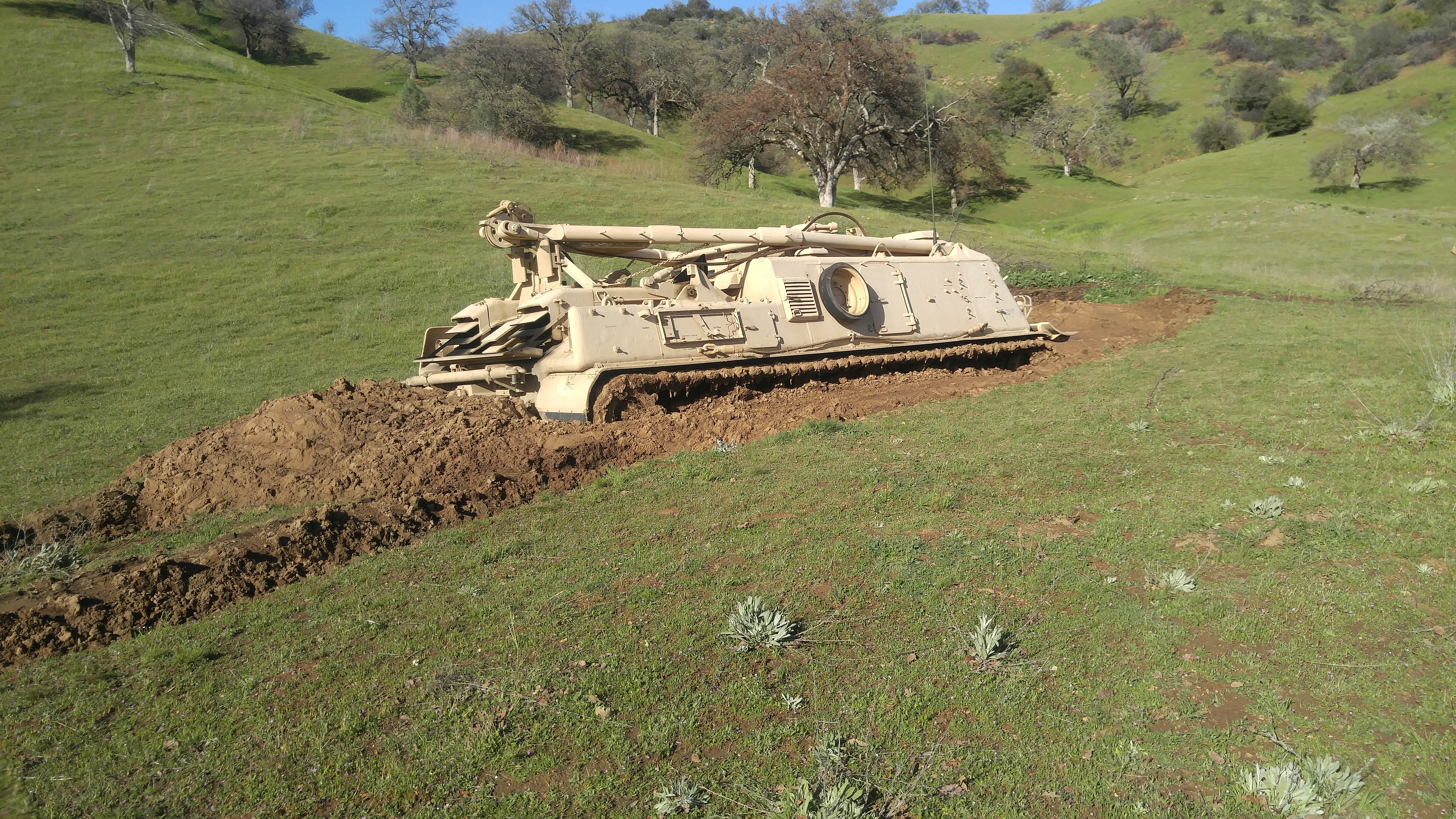
An M88 mired as it attempted to crest a hill in heavy rain during night training in Fort Hunter Liggett, California.

During the Gulf War, the U.S. Army recognized the M88A1's insufficient power, weight, mobility, and hoist-winch capabilities, making it unable to effectively recover M1 Abrams. The M88A1's speed, when towing an Abrams, could not exceed 8 km/h (5 mph). Even at this speed, M88A1s often suffered from engine or transmission problems. The U.S. Army had already identified these problems and searched for an improvement vehicle as early as 1981.

One of the main issues afflicting the M88A2 is a high rate of winch failures. The leading cause of these failures is operation of the winch without tension on the cable. This leads to "birdnesting" loose wrapping and bunching up of the cable.

There is also concern with loss of traction when an M88A2 tows a heavy M1 Abrams on a slope in wet, muddy conditions. The M88A2 was extensively tested at the Aberdeen Proving Ground, Maryland, and in August 1998, was officially approved for the towing of 70-ton combat vehicles such as the M1 Abrams.

== Combat history ==
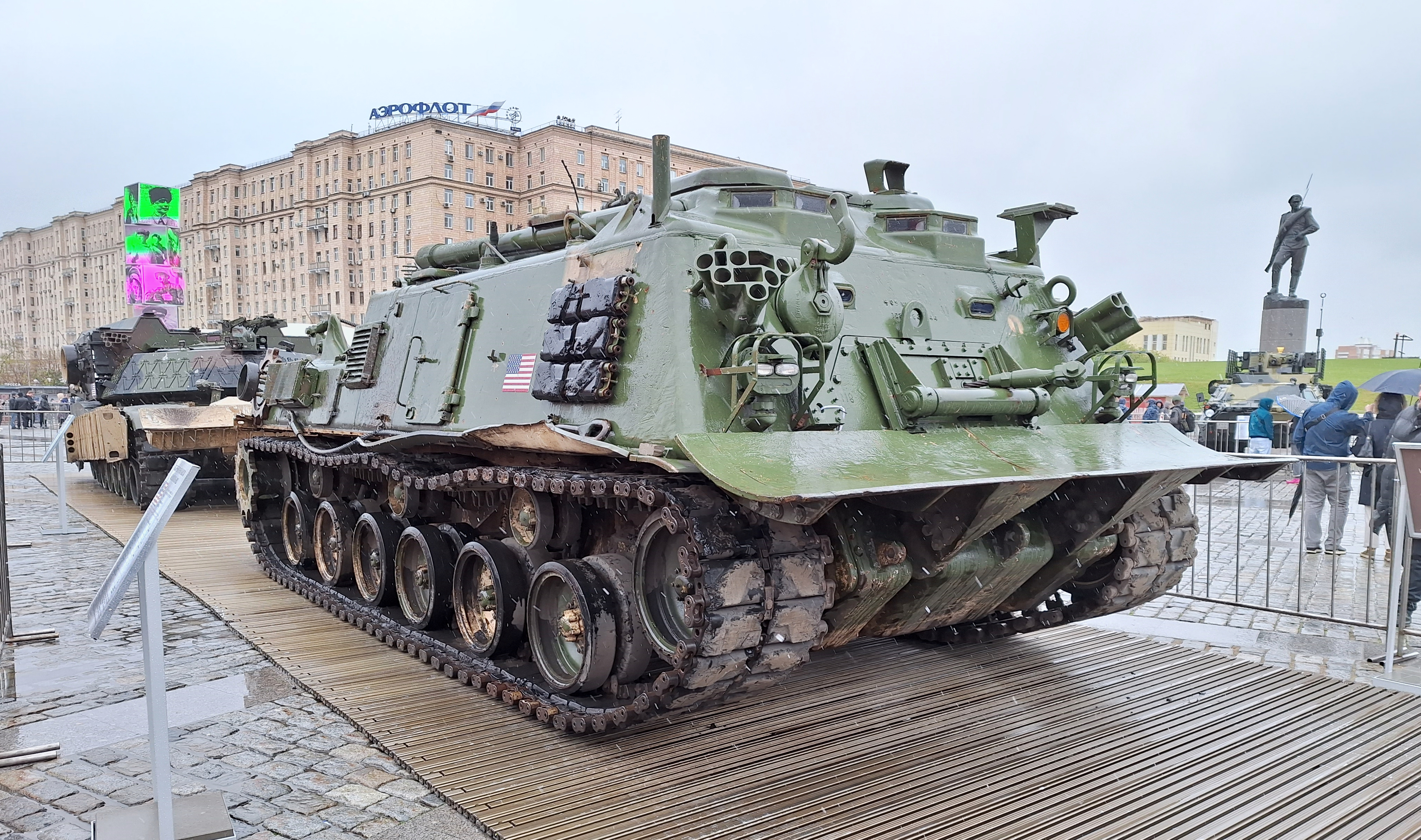
Captured Ukrainian M88 on exhibition in Moscow

About 8 M88s were sent to Ukraine during Russo-Ukrainian War as a part of a US aid package. They were used extensively in the 2023 Ukrainian counteroffensive. According to Oryx, at least 2 M88A1s were destroyed by Russian troops, while another one was captured, and 2 M88A2s were abandoned.

== Operators ==
A map of M88 operators in red

=== Current operators ===
- Australia: 13× M88A2 in service with the Australian Army. Another 6 ordered.
- Austria: 10× M88A1 still in service with the Austrian Armed Forces.
- Bahrain: 4× M88A1 in service with the Royal Bahraini Army. Purchase of 4 additional vehicles requested and approved.
- Brazil: 17x M88A1 in service with the Brazilian Army
- Egypt: 221× M88A1 + 87× M88A2 in service with the Egyptian Army.
- Greece: 95× M88A1 in service with the Greek Army.
- Iraq: 29× M88A2 in service with the Iraqi Army. Another 8 ordered; to be delivered from late 2013-mid-2014.
- Israel: 25× M88A1 in service with the Israeli Army.
- Jordan: 52× M88A1 in service with the Royal Jordanian Land Force.
- Lebanon: 1x M88A1 received in 2009 + 2x M88A2 received in 2019 in service with the Lebanese Armed Forces.
- Kuwait: 14× M88A2 in service with the Kuwait Army.
- Morocco: 81× M88A1 in service with the Royal Moroccan Army
- Pakistan: 52× M88A1 in service with the Pakistan Army.
- Poland: 26x M88A2 in service with the Polish Army. Another 23 ordered.
- Portugal: 8× M88A1 in service with the Portuguese Army.
- Saudi Arabia: 78× M88A1 in service with the Saudi Arabian Army. The potential sale of a further 20 was announced in August 2016.
- Spain: 1× M88A1 in service with the Spanish Navy Marines.
- Sudan: 2× M88A1 in service with the Sudan People's Armed Forces.
- Republic of China: 37× M88A1 in service with the Republic of China Army. 14× M88A2 order.
- Thailand: 22× M88A1 + 6 M88A2 in service with the Royal Thai Army.
- Tunisia: 6× M88A1 in service with the Tunisian Armed Forces.
- Turkey: 33× M88A1 in service with the Turkish Armed Forces
- United States
  - United States Army: 360 M88A1; 933 M88A2 (estimated 1000 more M88A1 in storage) as of January 2025
  - United States Marine Corps: total 69 procured. As of 2020, the USMC is divesting the M88 as part of Force Design 2030.
- Ukraine: 8x are in use by the Ukrainian Armed Forces, procured as part of a military aid package from the United States.

=== Former operators ===
- West Germany / Germany : 125× M88A1 (local designation: Bergepanzer 1) in service from 1962 to 2000 with the German Army, replaced by Bergepanzer 2 (based on Leopard 1) and Bergepanzer 3 Büffel (based on Leopard 2)
- Lebanese Forces (militia)
- Norway
- Republic of Sudan (1985–2019)

=== Future operators ===
- Romania: 4xM88A2 will be received alongside the M1A2R tanks

== See also ==
- XM1205 Field Recovery and Maintenance Vehicle – U.S. Army proposed replacement under Future Combat Systems
- Challenger Armoured Repair and Recovery Vehicle – British recovery vehicle supporting the Challenger tank
