= Future Combat Systems Manned Ground Vehicles =

FCS Manned Ground Vehicles
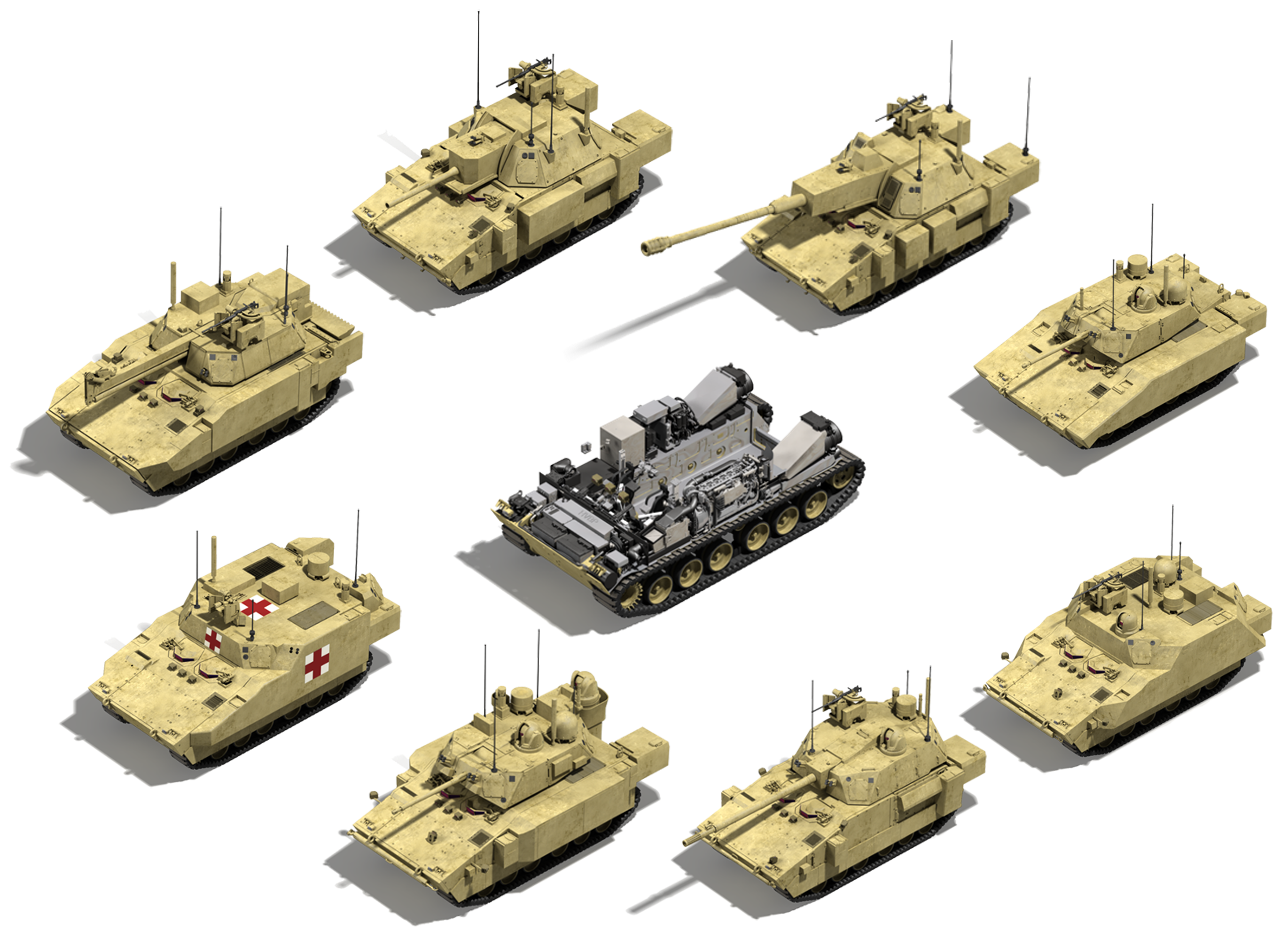
- All variants of the Manned Ground Vehicles program, and the MGV common chassis
- Type: Tracked armored fighting vehicles
- Place of origin: United States

Production history
- Designer: BAE Systems and General Dynamics
- Designed: 2002–2009
- Variants: Reconnaissance and surveillance vehicle, mounted combat system, non-line-of-sight cannon, non-line-of-sight mortar, field recovery and maintenance vehicle, infantry carrier vehicle, medical vehicle, command and control vehicle

Specifications
- Crew: Varies from 2–4 depending on vehicle
- Secondary armament: Most vehicles armed with a machine gun
- Engine: Detroit Diesel 5L890

The Manned Ground Vehicles (MGV) was a family of lighter and more transportable ground vehicles developed by Boeing and subcontractors BAE Systems and General Dynamics as part of the U.S. Army's Future Combat Systems (FCS) program. The MGV program was intended as a successor to the Stryker of the Interim Armored Vehicle program.

The MGV program was set in motion in 1999 by Army Chief of Staff Eric Shinseki.

The MGVs were based on a common tracked vehicle chassis. The lead vehicle, and the only one to be produced as a prototype, was the XM1203 non-line-of-sight cannon. Seven other vehicle variants were to follow.

The MGV vehicles were conceived to be exceptionally lightweight (initially capped at 18 tons base weight) to meet the Army's intra-theatre air mobility requirements. The vehicles that the Army sought to replace with the MGVs ranged from 30 to 70 tons. In order to reduce weight, the Army substituted armor with passive and active protection systems.

The FCS program was terminated in 2009 due to concerns about the program's affordability and technology readiness. The MGV program was succeeded by the Ground Combat Vehicle program, which was canceled in 2014.

== History ==
Initial Technology Demonstrator Vehicle by United Defense yielded both tracked and wheeled prototypes. Only the tracked variant was pursued further.

FCS-Wheeled (FCS-W) was an early concept designed to demonstrate a hybrid-electric drive system and two-man cockpit workstations. A Technology Demonstrator Vehicle was built by United Defense and was unveiled in 2002.

FCS-W was designed to deliver a top road speed of 75 mph and a top cross-country speed of 40 mph. The vehicle's armor utilized armor similar to the tracked variant but was lighter. The vehicle would have also had some type of active protection system. The arrangement of the turbine and drive motor provided for a two-man, side-by-side cockpit and a sizable payload compartment.

In May 2000, DARPA awarded four contracts to four industry teams to develop Future Combat Systems designs and in March 2002, the Army chose Boeing and Science Applications International Corporation (SAIC) to serve as the "lead systems integrators" to oversee the development and eventual production of the FCS’ 18 systems. In October 2002 United Defense (UD) and Boeing/SAIC signed a memorandum of understanding to bring the Objective Force non-line-of-sight cannon under the FCS umbrella.

In January 2003, Boeing and SAIC reached an agreement with General Dynamics Land Systems (GDLS) and United Defense LP (UDLP) to develop the MGVs. UDLP was responsible for leading development of five of the vehicles (including the NLOS-C) while GDLS took responsibility for leading development of the other three.

In May 2003 the Defense Acquisition Board (DAB) approved the FCS’ next acquisition phase, and in August 2004 Boeing and SAIC awarded contracts to 21 companies to design and build its various platforms and hardware and software.

In December 2003, GDLS received a $2 billion MGV design contract from Boeing. Per the contract, GDLS would produce 8 Mounted Combat Systems, 6 command and control vehicles, and 4 reconnaissance and surveillance vehicle prototypes.

In March 2005, the Army's acquisition chief Claude Bolton told the House Armed Services subcommittee that getting the MGV's weight to under 19-tons was proving difficult. In 2005 the Army relented on the vehicle's requirement for roll-off C-130 transportability. Relaxing the C-130 requirement to allow vehicles to be transported in a stripped-down configuration allowed the weight cap to be increased from 18 tons per vehicle to 24 tons.

In August 2005, GDLS selected Detroit Diesel's 5L890 to power the eight variants.

The Department of Defense announced budget cuts in April 2009, which resulted in the cancellation of the FCS Manned Ground Vehicles family. The Army issued a stop-work order for MGV and NLOS-C efforts in June. In July the army terminated the MGV, but not the NLOS-C. In the news release the Army said cancelation would "negatively impact" NLOS-C development but said it was seeking a "viable path forward" for the NLOS-C.

The DoD determined that the proposed FCS vehicle designs would not provide sufficient protection against IEDs.

The Army planned to restart from the beginning on manned ground vehicles. The program's heavier successor, the Ground Combat Vehicle, was cancelled in 2014.

== Design ==
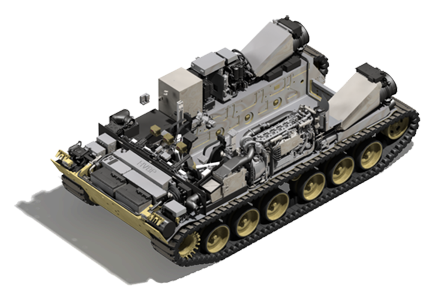
Chassis and components

In order to reduce weight, the Army substituted armor with passive and active protection systems. This was hoped to provide a level of protection similar to the legacy armored vehicles being replaced.

Quick Kill active protection system takes out an RPG in a test in October 2007

Most vehicles were protected with hard-kill active protection systems capable of defeating most threats. The armor was a unique secret matrix that may be utilized by industry in the Ground Combat Vehicle program.

The common MGV chassis was required to provide full protection from 30 mm and 45 mm cannon fire in a 60-degree arc opening towards the front of the vehicle. 360-degree protection from small arms fire up to 14.5 mm heavy machine gun and 155 mm artillery shell air-bursts was planned. Protection from higher caliber rounds as well as anti-tank guided missiles would be provided by an active protection system manufactured by Raytheon known as "Quick Kill".

Use of a common chassis was to reduce the need for specialized training of personnel and allow for faster fielding of repairs. The MGV platform utilized a hybrid diesel-electric propulsion system. The MGV also employed numerous weight-saving features, including composite armor, composite and titanium structural elements, and continuous band tracks.

The 30 mm Mk44 Bushmaster II chain gun on the reconnaissance and surveillance vehicle and infantry carrier vehicle provided greater firepower, yet weighed 25% less than the M242 Bushmaster it would replace.

=== Weight growth ===
Weight at full combat capability (FCC) was raised to 24 tons in June 2006, then to 27.4 tons in January. According to a former program official, MGV chassis weights entered a "death spiral," as any weight growth to the subsystems cascaded to the whole system (e.g. heavier armor required a stronger suspension to carry it). FCC weight was eventually raised to 30 tons.

TRADOC was slow to update its expectations for the MGV. TRADOC recommended removing C-130 transportability requirements in 2007 and raising the weight limit to 27.4 tons in requirements drafted in 2007. However, TRADOC's essential combat configuration MGV weight remained capped at 38,000 pounds (19 tons) until the program's cancelation.

== Armor and countermeasures ==
MGVs in essential combat configuration were required to have all-around protection from 14.5 mm caliber ammunition, and 30 mm from the front. This requirement was changed later that year to 14.5 mm protection with add-on armor.

In 2008, the Army added a requirement for an add-on V-hull kit.

== Vehicles ==
Comparison of variants
Name	Developer	Vehicle replaced	Number per brigade
XM1201 reconnaissance and surveillance vehicle (RSV)	General Dynamics (GD)	M3 Bradley	30
XM1202 mounted combat system (MCS)	GD	M1 Abrams	60
XM1203 non-line-of-sight cannon (NLOS-C)	BAE Systems (BAE)	M109 howitzer	18
XM1204 non-line-of-sight mortar (NLOS-M)	BAE	M1064 mortar carrier	24
XM1205 field recovery and maintenance vehicle (FRMV)	BAE	M88 Recovery Vehicle	10
XM1206 infantry carrier vehicle (ICV)	BAE	M2 Bradley and M113	102
XM1207 and XM1208 medical vehicle (MV)	BAE	N/A	29
XM1209 command and control vehicle (C2V)	GD	M113 command variant	49

=== Reconnaissance and surveillance vehicle ===
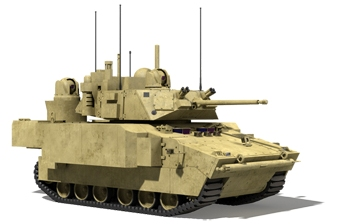
XM1201 reconnaissance and surveillance vehicle (RSV)

The XM1201 reconnaissance and surveillance vehicle (RSV) featured a suite of advanced sensors to detect, locate, track, classify and automatically identify targets under all climatic conditions, day or night.

The suite included a mast-mounted, long-range optoelectronic infrared sensor, an emitter mapping sensor for radio frequency interception and direction finding, chemical sensor and a multifunction radio frequency sensor.

The RSV also features the onboard capability to conduct automatic target detection, aided target recognition and level-one sensor fusion. To further enhance the scout capabilities, the RSV was also to be equipped with Unattended Ground Sensors, a Small Unmanned Ground Vehicle with various payloads and two unmanned aerial vehicles. It was to be armed with a 30 mm MK44 autocannon and a coaxial 7.62 mm M240 machine gun.

=== Mounted combat system ===
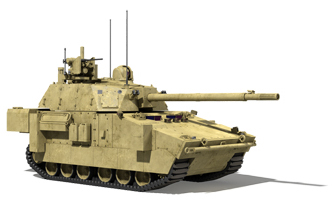
XM1202 mounted combat system (MCS)

The XM1202 mounted combat system (MCS) was planned as a successor to the M1 Abrams main battle tank.

The MCS was to provide both direct and beyond-line-of-sight ('indirect') firepower capability and allowed for in-depth destruction of point targets up to 8 km (5.0 mi) away.

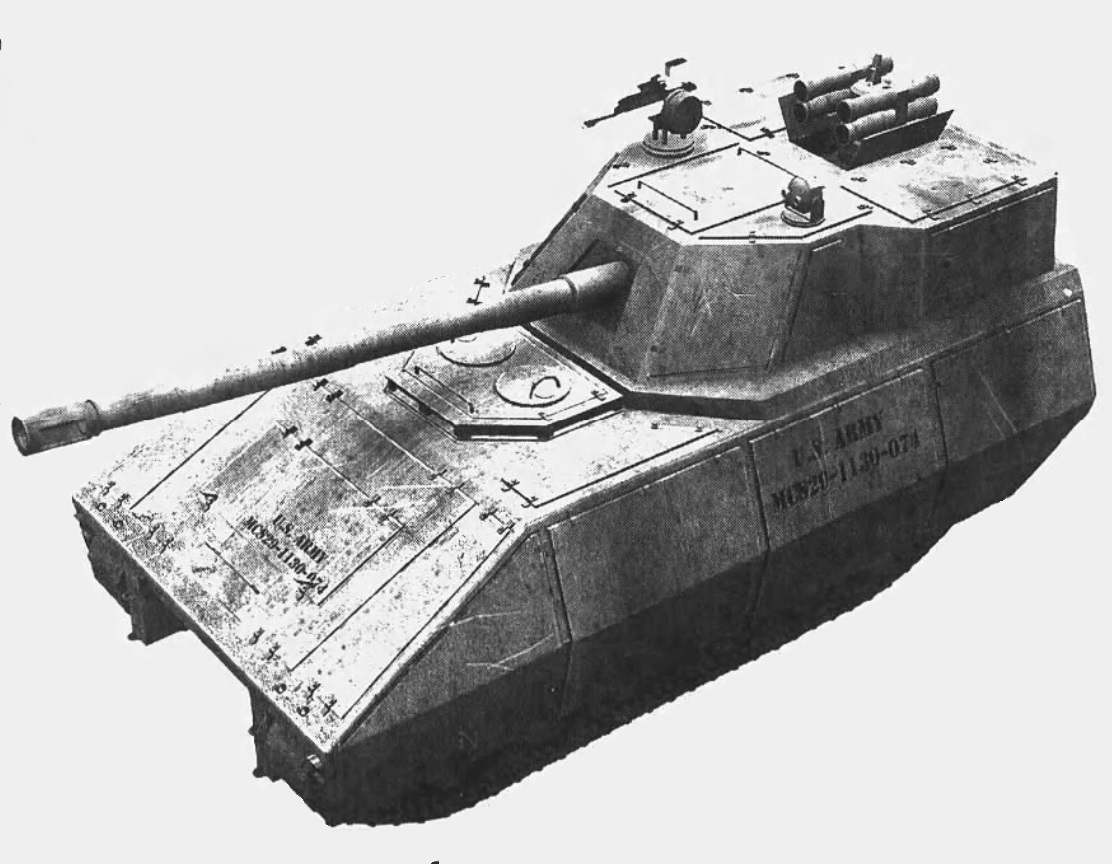
MCS computer drawing c. 2004

As of 2009 the MCS was to have had a crew of two and to be armed with an autoloaded 120 mm main gun, a 12.7 mm (.50) caliber machine gun, and a 40 mm automatic grenade launcher.

The MCS was intended to deliver precision fire at a rapid rate, in order to destroy multiple targets at standoff ranges quickly, and would complement the other systems in the unit of action. It would be capable of providing direct support to the dismounted infantry in an assault, defeating bunkers, and breaching walls during tactical assaults. It was also intended to be highly mobile, in order to maneuver out of contact and into positions of advantage; given the vehicle's light weight, this was especially important.

In May 2003, Army officials revealed a computer model of the MCS, allowing reporters to view the inside of the vehicle through a Cave automatic virtual environment. This concept used a crew of three.

The Picatinny Arsenal XM360 tank gun had been selected by September 2006. The gun underwent test firing at Aberdeen Proving Ground beginning in March 2008. General Dynamics Armament and Technical Products was awarded a $14 million contract in 2007 to develop the ammunition handling system. In January 2008, Raytheon was awarded a $232 million contract to develop the XM1111 Mid-Range Munition. The munition had been test-fired from an M1 Abrams as early as March 2007. The Army tested a 27-round magazine ammunition handling system at Aberdeen Proving Ground by July 2008.

This was considered the most complex of the three vehicles GDLS was contracted to build.

=== Non-line-of-sight cannon ===
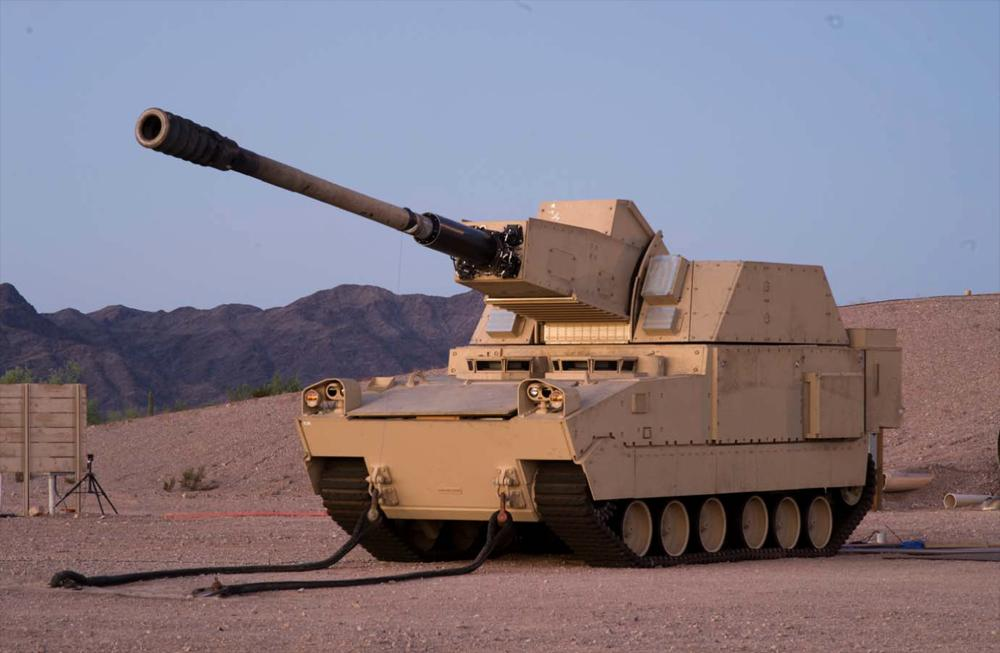
XM1203 NLOS-C at Yuma Proving Ground c. 2009

The XM1203 non-line-of-sight cannon (NLOS-C) was a 155 mm self-propelled howitzer to succeed the M109 howitzer. This was the lead vehicle effort, and most far along when the program was terminated in 2009. The NLOS-C used technology from the canceled XM2001 Crusader project.

The NLOS-C incorporated the autoloader from the Crusader project. The NLOS-C featured an improved fire rate over the M109. It was capable of multiple rounds simultaneous impact (MRSI), where the cannon fires a sequence of several rounds at different trajectories such that the rounds all hit the same target at the same time. The system had the ability to switch shell types quickly on a one-by-one basis.

Improvements in the refueling arrangements and automation of ammunition reloading reduced the amount of time spent on resupply and during which the gun would be unavailable for combat support. This also allowed the system to use a crew of two instead of five.

The NLOS-C had a high commonality with the NLOS-Mortar vehicle.

The first NLOS-C prototype was rolled out in May 2008. Eight prototypes were delivered to the U.S. Army's Yuma Proving Ground in Arizona by 2009.

Although Defense Secretary Robert Gates ended the MGV program in April 2009, Congress had directed that the Army continue working on the NLOS-C as a separate initiative. The Pentagon directed the Army to cancel the NLOS-C in December.

=== Non-line-of-sight mortar ===
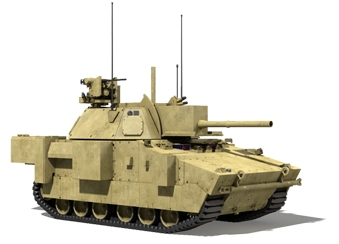
XM1204 non-line-of-sight mortar (NLOS-M)

The XM1204 non-line-of-sight mortar (NLOS-M) was a turreted mortar carrier with a crew of four.

The NLOS-M had a breech-loading, gun-mortar that fired 120 mm munitions including the Precision Guided Mortar Munition (PGMM). It had a fully automated firing control system and a manually assisted, semi-automated ammunition loading system.

The NLOS-M would carry an 81 mm mortar for dismounted operations away from the carrier.

The NLOS-M provides fires on-demand to engage complex and simultaneous target sets. As part of an NLOS-M battery, individual NLOS-M vehicles would have provided precision-guided rounds to destroy high-value targets, protective fires to suppress and obscure the enemy, and illumination fires.

The FCS command, control, communications, computers, intelligence, surveillance and reconnaissance (C4ISR) network would have enabled the NLOS-M fire control system to conduct semi- to autonomous computation of technical fire direction, automatic gun lay, preparation of the ammunition for firing, and mortar round firing.

In January 2003 United Defense, now part of BAE Systems, was selected by the Army and the FCS lead systems integrators (Boeing and SAIC) to develop and build the NLOS-M.

The NLOS mortar had high commonality with the NLOS cannon.

=== Recovery and maintenance vehicle ===
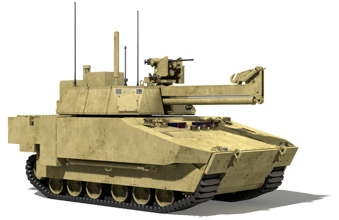
XM1205 field recovery and maintenance vehicle (FRMV)

The XM1205 field recovery and maintenance vehicle (FRMV) was the armoured recovery vehicle and maintenance system for employment within both the unit of action (UA) and unit of employment (UE).

The recovery vehicle was designed to hold a crew of three with additional space for three additional recovered crew.

Each UA would have a small number of 2–3 soldier combat repair teams within the organic Forward Support Battalion to perform field maintenance requirements beyond the capabilities of the crew chief/crew, more in-depth battle damage assessment repair, and limited recovery operations.

The FRMV was armed with a close combat support weapon (CCSW) and a 40 mm Mk 19 grenade launcher.

The FMRV was deferred in 2003, then restored in July 2004.

=== Infantry carrier vehicle ===
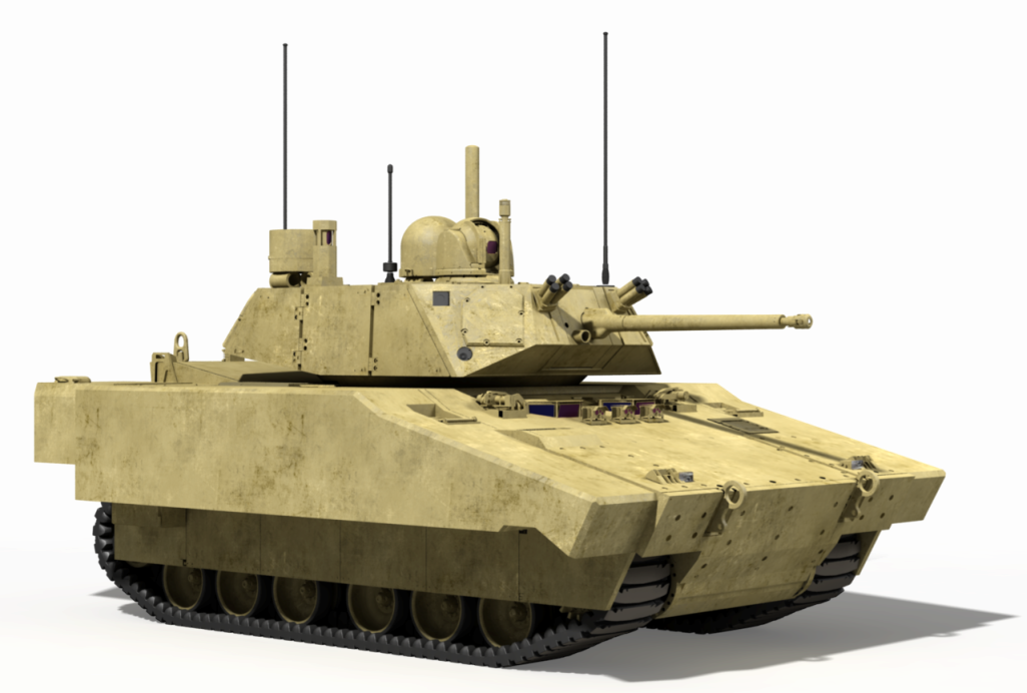
Artist's impression of the XM1206 infantry carrier vehicle

The XM1206 infantry carrier vehicle (ICV) was a set of similar infantry fighting vehicles for transporting and supporting ground troops. The ICV featured a crew of 2 and space for 9 passengers.

It was armed with a 30 mm or 40 mm cannon and a 7.62 mm machine gun.

The ICV family consists of four versions fitted for the specific roles of: a company commander; a platoon leader; rifle squad; and a weapons squad. All were visually similar to prevent targeting of a specific ICV versions.

A platoon would consist of a platoon leader vehicle, three rifle squad vehicles and a weapon squad vehicle.

The rifle squad ICV and weapons squad ICV each carry a 9-person infantry squad into close battle and support the squad by providing offensive and defensive fire, while carrying the majority of the soldiers' equipment. The ICV can move, shoot, communicate, detect threats, and protect crew and critical components under all weather conditions, day or night.

The squad would have access to Army and joint fire delivery systems from external sources (e.g. the NLOS-Cannon) to enhance the squad's range, precision, or quantity of fire. FCS Networking with other components of the unit of action permits rapid identification of targets and improves situational awareness.

=== Medical vehicle ===
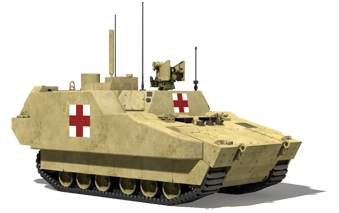
XM1207 Medical vehicle – evacuation (MV-E)/XM1208 medical vehicle – treatment (MV-T)

The XM1207 and XM1208 medical vehicle was an armoured ambulance designed to provide advanced trauma life support within one hour to critically injured soldiers. The medical vehicle serves as the primary medical system within the unit of action (UA) with two mission modules: "evacuation" and "treatment".

The XM1207 medical vehicle – evacuation (MV-E) vehicle allows trauma specialists, maneuvering with combat forces, to be closer to the casualty's point-of-injury and was to be used for casualty evacuation.

The XM1208 medical vehicle – treatment (MV-T) vehicle enhances the ability to provide advanced trauma management (ATM)/advanced trauma life support (ATLS) treatments and procedures forward for more rapid casualty interventions and clearance of the battlespace.

Both would have crews of four and the capability to carry four patients. Both medical vehicle mission modules were intended to be capable of conducting medical procedures and treatments using installed networked telemedicine interfaces: Medical Communications for Combat Casualty Care, and the Theater Medical Information Program (TMIP).

=== Command and control vehicle ===
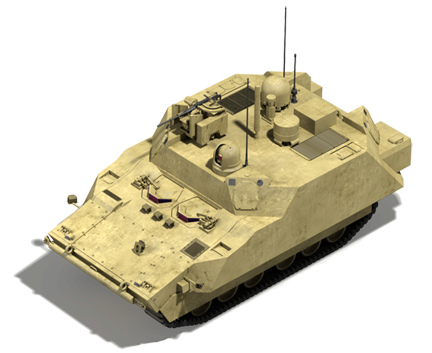
XM1209 command and control vehicle (C2V)

The XM1209 command and control vehicle (C2V) was to provide for information management of the integrated network of communications and sensor capability within the unit of action and provide the tools for commanders to synchronize their knowledge with leadership.

The C2V was to have had a crew of two and carry four staff officers.

It was to be located within the headquarters sections at each echelon of the unit of action down to the company level, and with its integrated command, control, and communications equipment suite, was to make command and control on the move possible.

The C2Vs were to contain all the interfaces required to enable the commander to use the C4ISR network. In addition, the C2Vs were meant to make possible the establishment, maintenance and distribution of a common operating picture fused from the friendly, enemy, civilian, weather and terrain situations, while on the move. The crew was to use its integrated C4ISR suite (communication, computers and sensor systems) to receive, analyze and transmit tactical information via voice, video and data inside and outside the unit of action.

The C2V was also planned to employ unmanned systems, such as unmanned aerial vehicles (UAVs).

== See also ==
- Interim Armored Vehicle, a U.S. Army program that resulted in the acquisition of the Stryker
- Armored Systems Modernization, a wide-ranging U.S. Army combat vehicle acquisition program cancelled after the end of the Cold War
- XM2001 Crusader, a canceled U.S. Army self-propelled howitzer
- Combat Vehicle Reconnaissance (Tracked), similar British equivalent
- Armata Universal Combat Platform, similar Russian program

== Sources ==
- Pernin, Christopher; Axelband, Elliot; Drezner, Jeffrey; Dille, Brian; Gordon IV, John; Held, Bruce; McMahon, Scott; Perry, Walter; Rizzi, Christopher; Shah, Akhil; Wilson, Peter; Sollinger, Sollinger (2012). Lessons from the Army's Future Combat Systems Program (PDF) (Report). RAND Corporation. Archived (PDF) from the original on March 25, 2020 – via Defense Technical Information Center.
- The Army's Future Combat Systems Program and Alternatives (PDF) (Report). Congressional Budget Office. August 2006.
- "FCS Whitepaper". U.S. Army, 11 April 2006.
- Non-Line-Of-Sight Mortar (NLOS-M). Globalsecurity.org
