= Interim Armored Vehicle =

Acquisition program of United States Army

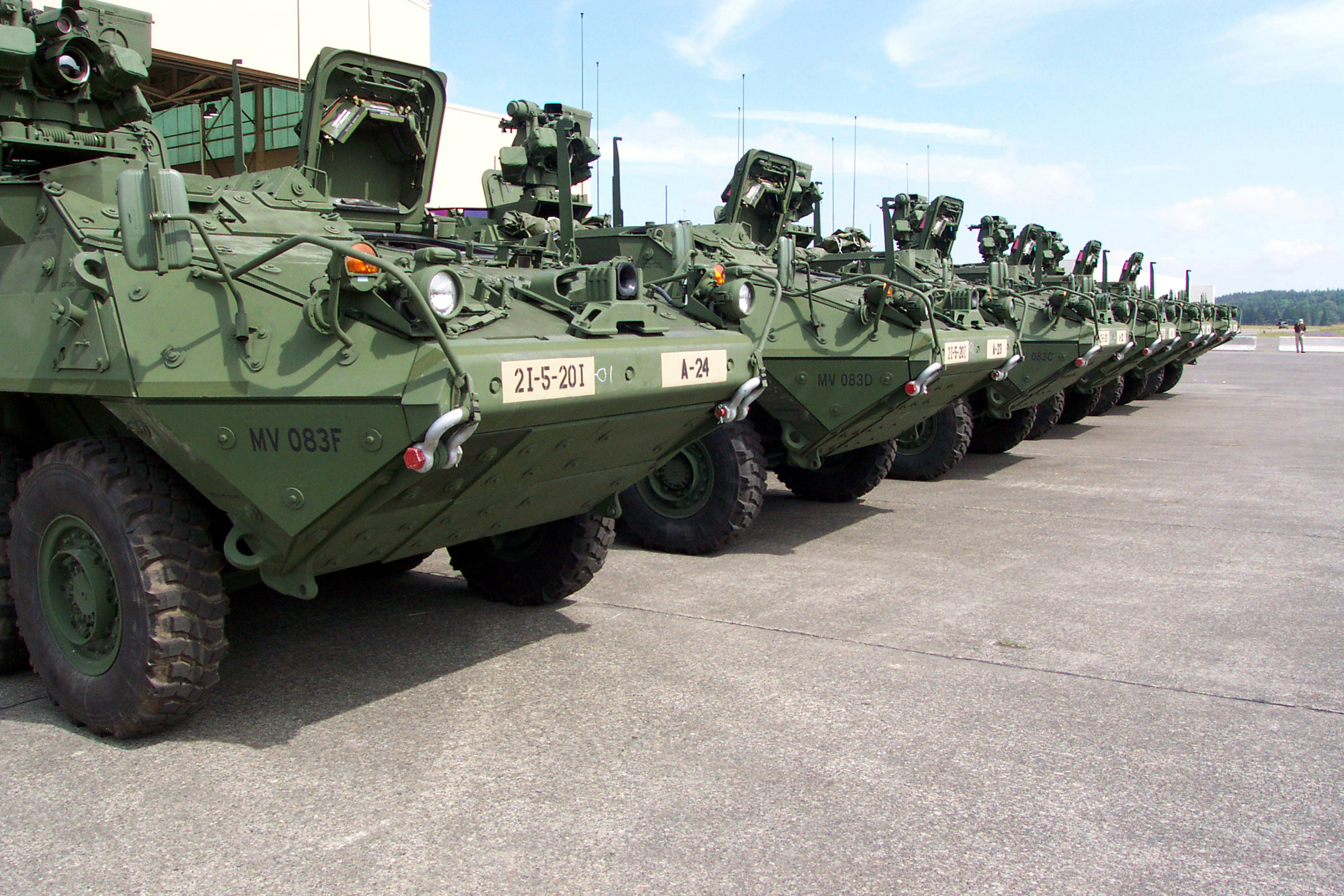
Interim Armored Vehicles arrive at Fort Lewis for the 3rd Brigade, 2d Infantry Division, Interim Brigade Combat Team c. 2003.

The Interim Armored Vehicle (IAV), previously known as the Medium Armored Vehicle (MAV), was a U.S. Army armored fighting vehicle acquisition program. General Dynamics Land Systems (GDLS) and General Motors Defense proposed a vehicle based on the LAV III. The Army selected the LAV III proposal over three other submissions. The LAV III was renamed Stryker.

== Shinseki's Army ==
In a June 1999 communique, U.S. Army Chief of Staff General Eric Shinseki said "our heavy forces are too heavy and our light forces lack staying power." He called for heavy units to be "more strategically deployable, and more agile with a smaller footprint, and light forces must be more lethal, survivable, and tactically mobile."

In remarks at Association of the United States Army meeting in October, Shinseki laid out his vision for a lighter, more transportable force. He called for a mid-weight unit that would strike a balance between heavy armor and infantry. Shinseki said such a unit would be especially capable for operations short of war. The Army was to do this by investing in an interim fleet that would herald the way to a much more advanced subsequent generation of vehicles (later called Future Combat Systems Manned Ground Vehicles).

Shinseki said one of his goals was to reduce the service's logistics footprint, which makes up 90 percent of its lift requirement. He expected to make this possible by building future fighting vehicles on a common chassis and using mutually compatible ammunition. He proposed that these vehicles be light enough for intra-theater airlift via C-130. He expected that the generation of vehicles after its next fleet would be wheeled, which would be up to 70 percent lighter than the interim fleet.

The technology for Shinseki's desired force was not expected to be ready until beyond 2010. In the interim, Shinseki sought to bring a prototype unit, using commercial off-the-shelf technologies, online by the end of the fiscal year.

== Proposals ==
The Army conducted a Platform Performance Demonstration at Fort Knox in January 2000. The demonstration was intended to inform the Army about what was available as well as assess each vehicle's adaptability to the new brigades and their potential for the insertion of new technology to improve its capabilities. Vehicles assessed included the Pandur, the M1117, the LAV III and LAV III assault gun variant, the Dragoon APC, the Bionix 25, the LAV 300 Mark II, the 6x6 Véhicule de l'Avant Blindé, the TPz Fuchs, the GDLS Dragoon, the Mobile Tactical Vehicle Light and the M8 Armored Gun System.

Commonality between vehicles was seen as a desired, but not essential characteristic. As of February 2000, the Army believed that most of the Medium Armored Vehicle variants would be based on the infantry carrier vehicle variant. The mobile gun system (MGS) and howitzer variants would be permitted to share less commonality. In March 2000, the Army confirmed it would award up to two contracts. In February, Major General John Caldwell had said the Army would only award one contract, rather than splitting the contract among two winners. In April, Shinseki said the Army had no preference of wheeled versus tracks but said "management could be pretty challenging," if both wheeled and tracked options were chosen.

The 3rd Infantry Brigade, 2nd Infantry Division, a heavy brigade at Fort Lewis, became the first to be converted into a Stryker Brigade beginning around March 2000. The U.S. Army outfitted the unit with LAV IIIs borrowed from Canada, which served as the main surrogate for the IAV. Others included the Lynx, TPz Fuchs, B1 Centauro and M113.

In April 2000, the Army released its request for proposals for the IAV.

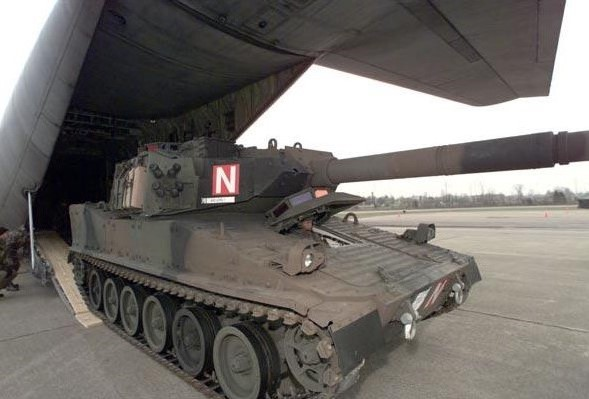
A United Defense AGS rolls off a C-130 for the IAV platform performance demonstration at Fort Knox circa December 1999.

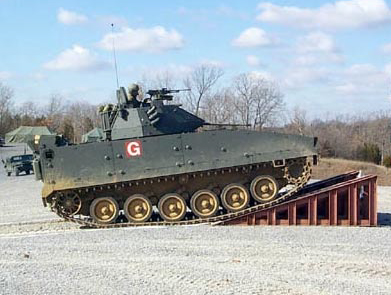
A Bionix 25 infantry fighting vehicle mounts a firing ramp at the IAV Platform Performance Demonstration.

Four teams submitted proposals:

- General Dynamics Land Systems (GDLS) and General Motors Defense of Canada proposed a vehicle based on the LAV III. The driveline was re-engineered to accommodate the larger payload requirements of the IAV. Height adjustable suspension was integrated to vary the ride height. The baseline armor was improved to defeat armor-piercing rounds up to 14.5 mm. GDLS would be responsible for the mobile gun system, nuclear, biological, and chemical (NBC) reconnaissance vehicle, medical evacuation vehicle, and mortar carrier.
- United Defense LP proposed the Mobile Tactical Vehicle Light (MTVL) and the M8 Armored Gun System (AGS), both tracked vehicles. The MTVL was based on the M113 armored personnel carrier and could carry 10 passengers. For the MGS requirement, three solutions were offered, the AGS and two variants of the MTVL; one with the AGS turret and 105mm gun, and another with a 90 mm Cockerill turret (called MGS 90). United Defense planned to upgrade M113A2 APCs in Army storage to the MTVL standard.
- ST Kinetics, a subsidiary of the Singapore firm ST Engineering, proposed the Bionix. ST Kinetics said its vehicle would be "100 percent American made" and created a U.S. subsidiary called Vision Kinetics to manage the project. Teledyne Brown Engineering provided integration work. Rather than rely on the private sector, ST Kinetics planned to partner with Army depots for most manufacturing (with the exception of its partnership with the Demmer Corporation, which was to produce the hull).
- GDLS subsidiary AV Technology and Steyr-Daimler-Puch Spezialfahrzeug proposed the 6x6 Pandur.

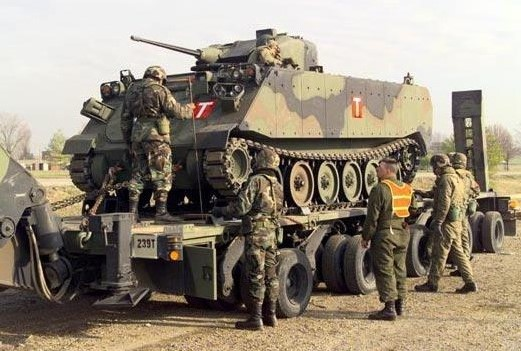
United Defense MTVL is driven onto a heavy equipment transporter for the IAV platform performance demonstration at Fort Knox circa December 1999.

In its evaluations, the Army noted that it found neither the wheeled nor the tracked candidates to have any definitive edge over the other. All else being equal, wheeled vehicles generally have less internal volume. However, the Army found the wheeled submissions had adequate space for its requirements. No significant differences in weight or mobility over terrain were seen.

In November 2000, the Army awarded the IAV contract to GM-GDLS. At $4 billion, the deal was the largest combat vehicle purchase since the Bradley Fighting Vehicle program in 1980. In its decision, the Army cited the LAV's greater mobility, particularly its high speed on paved roads. The Army was also impressed by the LAV's armor which, in its baseline configuration, could resist 14.5 mm rounds.

The service rejected a split buy of the M8 AGS offered by UDLP, citing the system's lower top speed and different maintenance requirements. The service said a single fleet would simplify maintenance and allow units to "move as a fighting unit."

At the same time as the contract award, the Army announced a 16-month schedule slip due to additional development work required on the MGS and fire support vehicle. The NBC vehicle also required additional integration work. The schedule slippage displeased Shinseki, who pressed GM–GDLS to hasten their work.

GAO's decision denying United Defense's protest in the IAV contract

In December 2000, UDLP filed a challenge to the contract award, forcing the Army to issue a stop-work order. In its protest, UDLP said its vehicles would be ready one to two years earlier at about half the cost of GM-GDLS's proposal. UDLP also alleged that Army officials had unfairly aided GM-GDLS's proposal by permitting the company to substitute its Stryker ATGM variant for the MGS variant due to a two-year schedule slippage in the latter.

The GAO denied UDLP's protest of the award in April 2001.

In February 2002, the Army formally renamed the IAV as the "Stryker" after two unrelated U.S. soldiers who posthumously received the Medal of Honor: Private First Class Stuart S. Stryker, who died in World War II, and Specialist Four Robert F. Stryker, who died in the Vietnam War.

== Variants ==
Army officials proposed a self-propelled howitzer IAV variant. Officials later tabled this idea as this variant would require considerable technological risk and expense. The service settled on M198 howitzer for its artillery requirement, later to be replaced by the M777 howitzer.

Planned buys as of December 2000:

- M1126 infantry carrier vehicle, 714
- M1127 reconnaissance vehicle, 321
- M1128 mobile gun system, 204
- M1129 mortar carrier, 241
- M1130 commander's vehicle, 252
- M1131 fire support vehicle, 97
- M1132 engineer squad vehicle, 72
- M1133 medical evacuation vehicle, 118
- M1134 anti-tank guided missile vehicle, 75
- M1135 nuclear, biological, chemical, reconnaissance vehicle, 37

== Comparison with light and heavy brigades ==
In 2000, the Army studied the differences between light, medium (interim) and heavy brigade combat teams. It concluded that medium brigades equipped with LAVs would cost 40 percent less to operate than heavy brigades. LAVs were expected to go at least 1000 mean miles between failures, compared to 654 for heavy brigades. Medium brigades were expected to move more quickly and provide greater survivability and firepower than light brigades.

In September 2002, the Army conducted a congressionally mandated side-by-side testing of the M113A3 and the Stryker.

Stryker crews operated more effectively in the Stryker. Interior space was less restricted in the Stryker. The quieter ride allowed crews to hold conversations and plan missions. Stryker drivers could sustain longer operations than M113 drivers, who could receive hearing damage after just five hours of continuous operations.

== See also ==
- Armored Systems Modernization, a wide-ranging U.S. Army combat vehicle acquisition program cancelled after the end of the Cold War
- Future Combat Systems Manned Ground Vehicles, a canceled U.S. Army program to replace the IAV and other heavy armor
- Joint Light Tactical Vehicle, a U.S. armed forces acquisition program to replace the Humvee
