= M113 armored personnel carrier =

M113
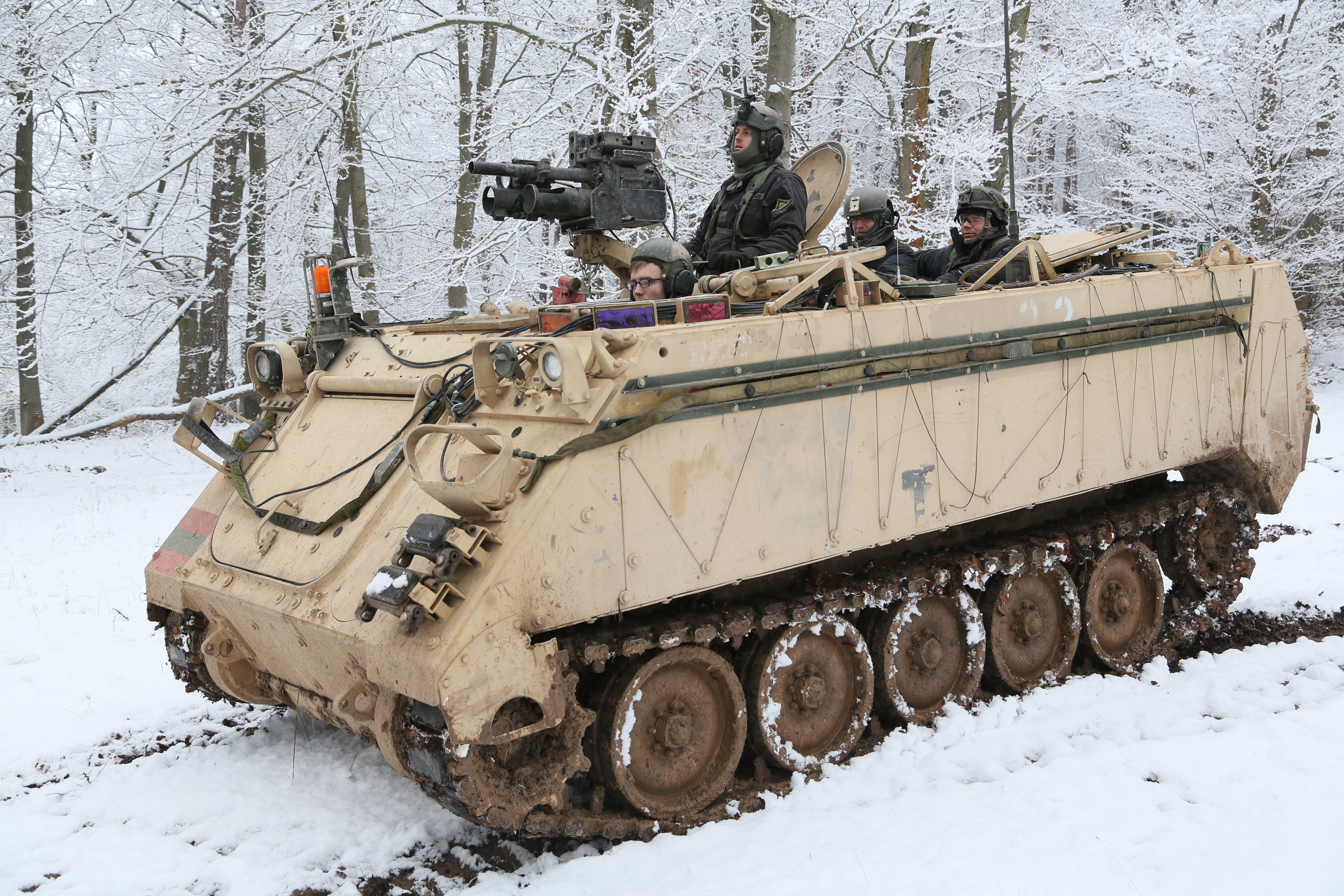
- A U.S. Army M113-OSV of 1st Battalion, 4th Infantry Regiment, provides overwatch while conducting recon operations during exercise Allied Spirit at the Joint Multinational Readiness Center in Hohenfels, Bavaria, in 2015.
- Type: Armored personnel carrier
- Place of origin: United States

Service history
- In service: 1960–present
- Used by: See Operators
- Wars: Cold War; Vietnam War; Laotian Civil War; Cambodian Civil War; Cambodian–Vietnamese War; Sino-Vietnamese War; Six-Day War; Indo-Pakistani war of 1965; Civil conflict in the Philippines; Indo-Pakistani war of 1971; Yom Kippur War; Turkish invasion of Cyprus; Lebanese Civil War; 1982 Lebanon War; Southern Lebanon conflict; U.S. invasion of Panama; Iran–Iraq War; Gulf War; Yugoslav Wars; Kosovo War; Global War on Terrorism; War in Afghanistan; Iraq War; Insurgency in Khyber Pakhtunkhwa; Second Intifada; 2006 Lebanon War; Gaza War; Libyan civil war (2011); Operation Protective Edge; Iraqi insurgency; Central African Republic Civil War; Syrian Civil War; War in Iraq (2013–2017); Yemeni Civil War; Saudi Arabian-led intervention in Yemen; Houthi-Saudi Arabian conflict; Battle of Marawi; Brazilian drug war; Russo-Ukrainian War; Russo-Ukrainian war (2022–present); Gaza war; 2025 Cambodia‒Thailand conflict

Production history
- Manufacturer: FMC Corporation; United Defense; BAE Systems
- Produced: 1960–2007
- No. built: ≈80,000 (all variants)
- Variants: Numerous, see text

Specifications
- Mass: 12.3 tonnes (13.6 short tons; 12.1 long tons)
- Length: 4.863 metres (15 ft 11.5 in)
- Width: 2.686 metres (8 ft 9.7 in)
- Height: 2.5 metres (8 ft 2 in)
- Crew: 2
- Passengers: 11–15 passengers
- Armor: 5083 aluminum alloy 28–44 millimeters (1.1–1.7 in)
- Main armament: M2 Browning machine gun
- Secondary armament: Varies (See text)
- Engine: Detroit Diesel 6V53T, 6-cylinder diesel engine 275 hp (205 kW)
- Power/weight: 22.36 hp/tonne
- Suspension: torsion bar, 5 road wheels
- Operational range: 480 km (300 mi)
- Maximum speed: 67.6 km/h (42.0 mph), 5.8 km/h (3.6 mph) swimming

The M113 is a fully tracked armored personnel carrier (APC) that was developed and produced by the FMC Corporation. The M113 was sent to United States Army Europe in 1961 to replace the mechanized infantry's M59 APCs. The M113 was first used in combat in April 1962 after the United States provided the South Vietnamese army (ARVN) with heavy weaponry such as the M113, under the Military Assistance Command, Vietnam (MACV) program. Eventually, the M113 was the most widely used armored vehicle of the U.S. Army in the Vietnam War and was used to break through heavy thickets in the midst of the jungle to attack and overrun enemy positions. It was largely known as an "APC" or an "ACAV" (armored cavalry assault vehicle) by the allied forces.

The M113 was the first aluminum hull combat vehicle to be put into mass production. Much lighter than earlier similar vehicles, its aluminum armor was designed to be thick enough to protect the crew and passengers against small arms fire, but light enough that the vehicle was air transportable and moderately amphibious.

In the U.S. Army, the M113 series have long been replaced as front-line combat vehicles by the M2 and M3 Bradleys, but large numbers are still used in support roles such as armored ambulance, mortar carrier, engineer vehicle, and command vehicle. The U.S. Army's heavy brigade combat teams are equipped with approximately 6,000 M113's and 6,724 Bradleys.

The M113's versatility spawned a wide variety of adaptations that live on worldwide and in U.S. service. These variants together currently represent about half of U.S. Army armored vehicles. It is estimated that over 80,000 vehicles in the M113 family have been produced and used by over 50 countries worldwide, making it one of the most widely used armored fighting vehicles of all time.

M113 production was terminated in 2007. The Army initiated the Armored Multi-Purpose Vehicle (AMPV) program to search for a replacement. In 2014, the U.S. Army selected BAE Systems' proposal of a turretless variant of the Bradley Fighting Vehicle to replace over 2,800 M113s in service. Thousands of M113s continue to see combat service in the Israel Defense Forces, although by 2014 the IDF was seeking to gradually replace many of its 6,000 M113s with the Namers, and with the Eitan AFV in 2020.

As of 2026, the U.S. Army continues to replace its M113 fleet in Armored Brigade Combat Teams with the newer Armored Multi-Purpose Vehicle (AMPV), developed by BAE Systems.

== Development ==
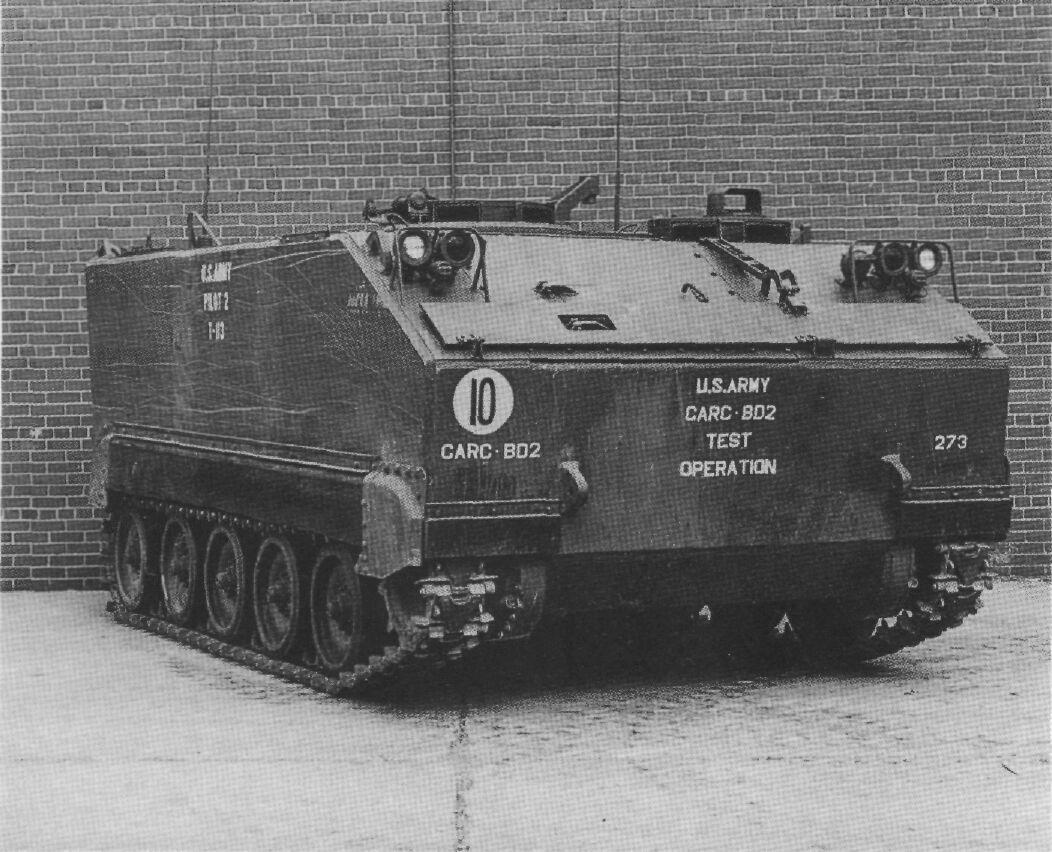
FMC T113 proposal

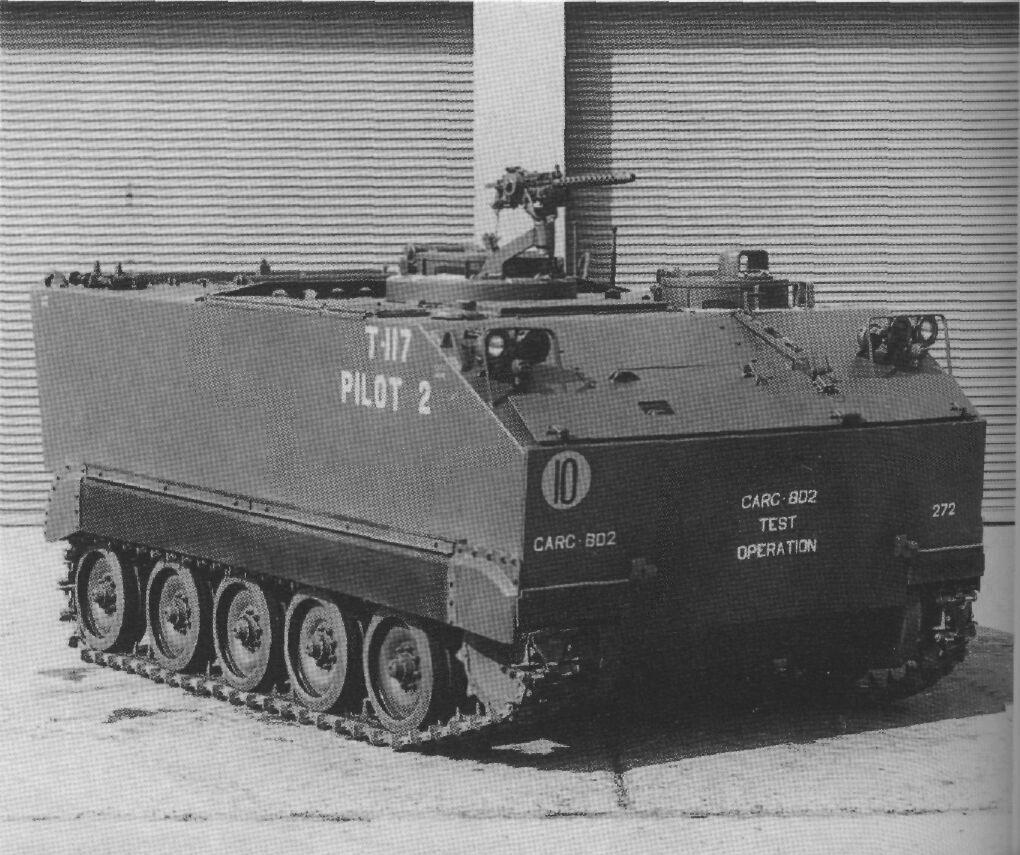
FMC T117 proposal

The M113 was developed by the FMC Corporation, which had produced the earlier M75 and M59 armored personnel carriers. The M113 bears a very strong resemblance to both of these earlier vehicles. The M75 was too heavy and expensive to be useful, as its weight precluded amphibious use and transport by air. The much cheaper and lightened M59 addressed both of these problems, but ended up with too little armor, and was unreliable as a result of its dual engine powertrain.

The Army was looking for a vehicle that combined the best features of both designs, the "airborne armored multi-purpose vehicle family" (AAM-PVF) of all-purpose, all-terrain armored fighting vehicles. FMC had been working with the Kaiser Aluminum in the late 1950s to develop a suitable aluminum armor that provided the protection of the M75 and the low weight and mobility of the M59.

FMC responded with two proposals; two versions of the aluminum T113 – one thicker and one more thinly armored – along with the similar but mostly steel T117. The thicker-armored version of the T113 – effectively the prototype of the M113 – was chosen because it weighed less than its steel competitor, whilst offering the same level of protection. An improved T113 design, the T113E1, was adopted by the U.S. Army in 1960 as the "M113". A diesel prototype, T113E2, was put into production in 1964 as the "M113A1", and quickly supplanted the gasoline-engined M113. FMC transferred the M113's production in 1994 to United Defense, its newly formed defense subsidiary. United Defense was acquired by BAE Systems in 2005.

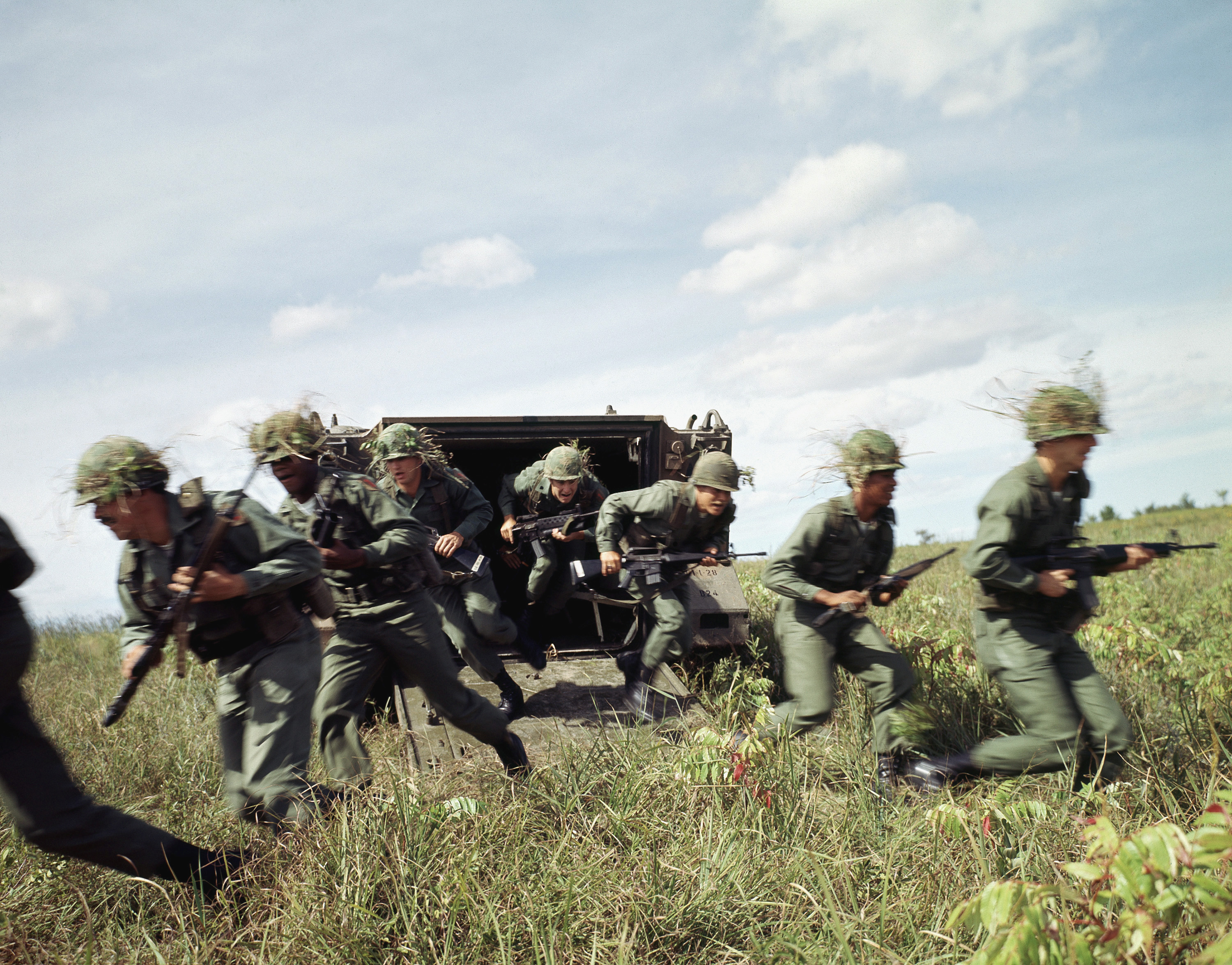
U.S. Army soldiers dismount from an M113 during a mechanized infantry training exercise in September 1985

The M113 was developed to provide a survivable and reliable light tracked vehicle able to be airlifted and airdropped by C-130 and C-141 transport planes. The original concept was that the vehicle would be used solely for transportation to move the troops forward under the protection of armor and then having them dismount for combat, after which the M113 would retreat to the rear. Entering service with the U.S. Army in 1960, the M113 required two crewmen, a driver and a commander, and carried 11-15 passengers inside the vehicle. Its main armament was a single .50-caliber (12.7 mm) M2 Browning machine gun operated by the commander. The first batch of 32 M113s arrived in South Vietnam on 30 March 1962 and were sent to two Army of the Republic of Vietnam (ARVN) mechanized rifle companies, each equipped with 15 of the APCs.

The two mechanized units were fielded for the first time on 11 June 1962. During the Battle of Ap Bac in January 1963, at least fourteen of the gunners aboard the M113s were killed in action due to their exposed position, necessitating modifications to improve crew survivability. Makeshift shields formed from metal salvaged from the hulls of sunken ships were soon fitted to the carriers, affording better protection; however, it was found that this material could be penetrated by small arms fire, so subsequent shields were constructed from scrapped armored vehicles. The ARVN 80th Ordnance Unit in South Vietnam developed the shield idea further and commenced engineering general issue gun shields for the M113. These shields became the predecessor to the standardized armored cavalry assault vehicle (or ACAV) variant and were issued to all ARVN mechanized units during the early 1960s.

According to Ralph Zumbro the ARVN had modified the M113s to function as "amphibious light tanks" and not as the battle taxis U.S. designers had intended. Instead of an armored personnel carrier, the ARVN used the carried infantry as extra "dismountable soldiers" in "an oversized tank crew". These "ACAV" sets were eventually adapted to U.S. Army M113s with the arrival of the army's conventional forces in 1965. The vehicles continued to operate in the role of a light tank and reconnaissance vehicle, and not as designed in theater.

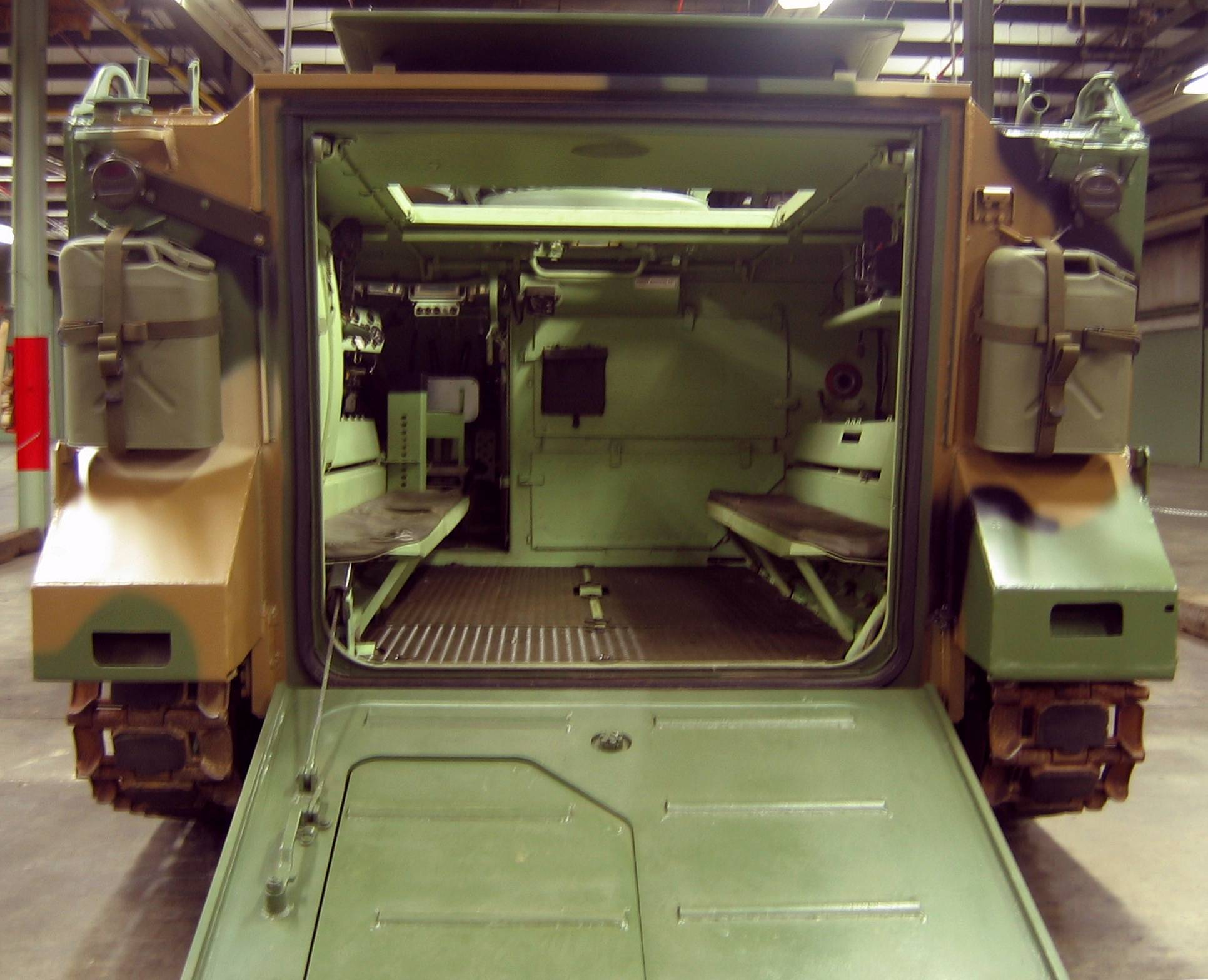
The interior of an M113 at the American Armored Foundation Museum in Danville, Virginia, July 2006

The U.S. Army soon came out with their own ACAV version. This more or less standardized ACAV kit included shields and a circular turret for the .50-caliber M2 machine gun in the track commander (TC) position, two M60 machine guns with shields for the left and right rear positions, and "belly armor"—steel armor bolted from the front bottom extending 1/2 to 2/3 of the way towards the bottom rear of the M113. The two rear machine gunners could fire their weapons while standing inside the rectangular open cargo hatch. This transformed the M113 into a fighting vehicle, but the vehicle still suffered from its lightly armored configuration, having never been designed for such a role. Canada also adopted the ACAV kits when employing the M113A2 during peacekeeping operations in the Balkans in the 1990s.

In order to improve the fighting ability of the mounted troops, a number of experiments were carried out in the 1960s under the MICV-65 project. These attempted to develop a true infantry fighting vehicle rather than an armored personnel carrier. Pacific Car and Foundry entered the steel-armored XM701, but this proved to be too slow and too heavy to be airmobile, even in the Lockheed C-141 Starlifter. FMC entered the XM734, which was largely the ACAV M113 but with the troops sitting facing outwards on a central bench, rather than facing inwards as in the M113. Four gun ports and vision blocks were added on each side to allow the seated troops to fire even while under cover. Although neither the XM701 or XM734 were deemed worthwhile to produce, FMC continued development of their version as the XM765 advanced infantry fighting vehicle (AIFV). The AIFV was sold to a number of third party-users in the 1970s, including the Netherlands, the Philippines and Belgium.

=== Modifications ===
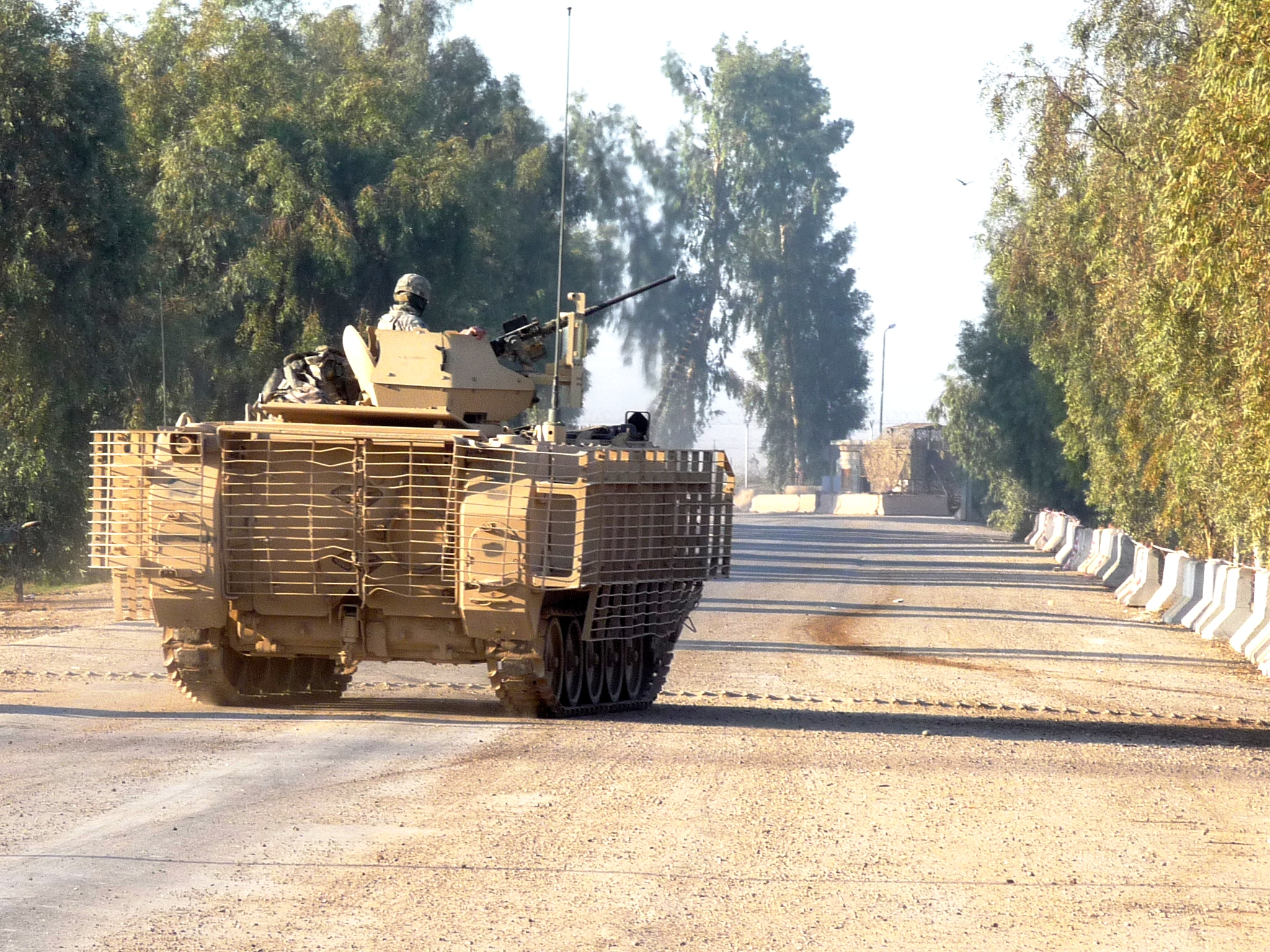
A United States Air Force M113 at Joint Base Balad, Iraq, in November 2008.

Modified versions of the Vietnam War ACAV sets were deployed to Iraq to equip the standard M113s still in service. The circular .50 caliber gun shields have been modified, while the rear port and starboard gun stations have been deleted for service in that region. Some of these modified vehicles have been utilized for convoy escort duties.

The M113 has light armor, but it can be augmented with add-on steel plates for improved ballistic protection. Reactive armor and slat armor can be added for protection against rocket-propelled grenades. Band tracks made of rubber are in use by Canadian and other forces to enable stealthy operation, less damage to paved roads, higher speed, less maintenance, access to terrain where operation of wheeled vehicles is impractical and less vibration and rolling resistance.

Most of the 13,000 M113s that are still in U.S. Army service have been upgraded to the A3 variant. The current U.S. Army M113 fleet includes a mix of M113A2 and A3 variants and other derivatives equipped with the most recent RISE (Reliability Improvements for Selected Equipment) package. The standard RISE package includes an upgraded propulsion system (turbocharged engine and new transmission), greatly improved driver controls (new power brakes and conventional steering controls), external fuel tanks, and 200-amp alternator with four batteries. Additional A3 improvements include the incorporation of spall liners and provision for mounting external armor.

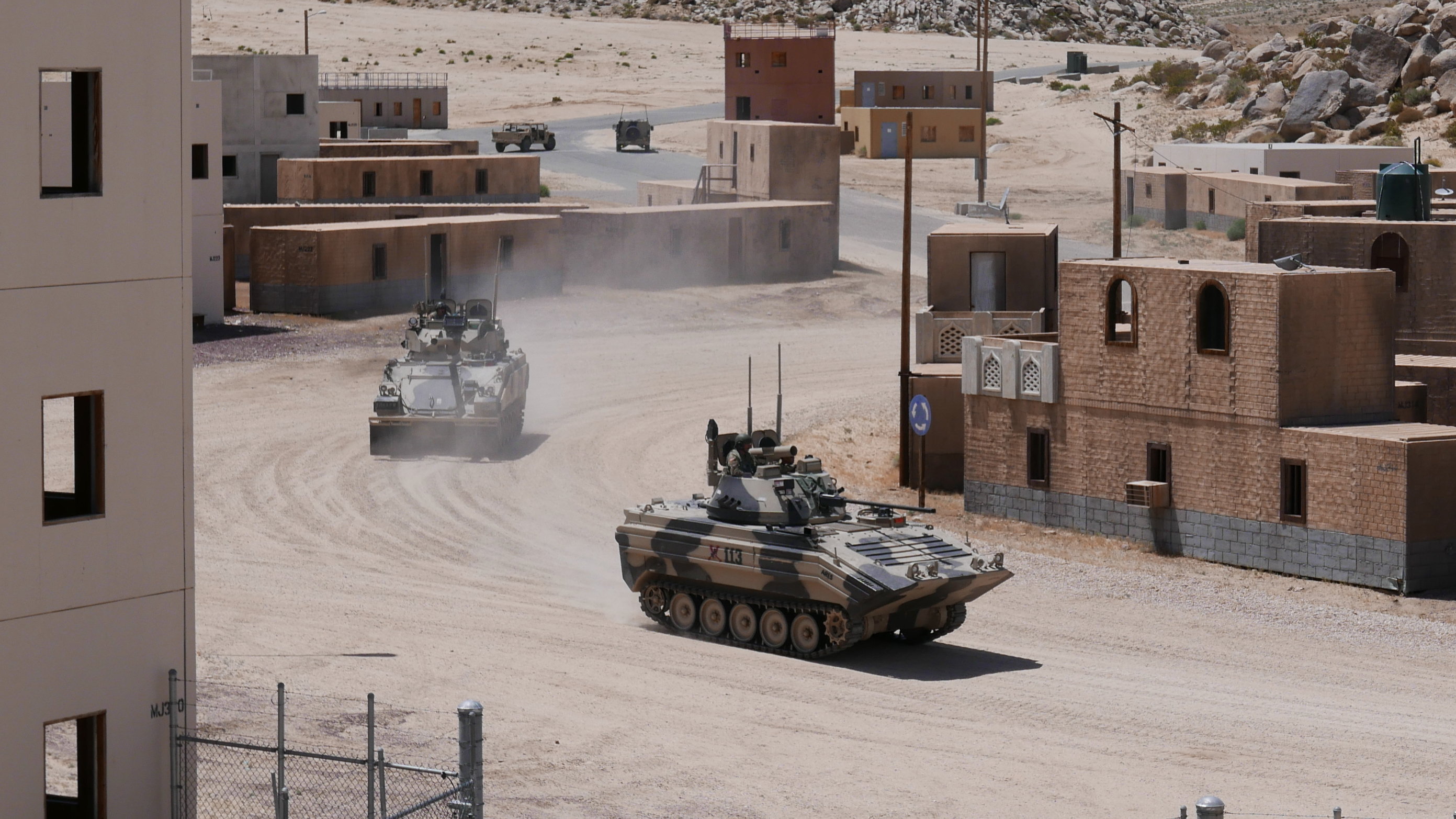
A M113A3/BMP-2 is followed by a M113A3/MBT at Fort Irwin NTC.

The U.S. Army's National Training Center in Fort Irwin, California began replacing their aging fleet of visually modified M551s being used to simulate Russian-made combat vehicles with M113s in 1995. The Combat Maneuver Training Center near Hohenfels, Germany followed suit soon after, adopting the M113 to their M60A3s. These M113s, like the M551s they replaced, have also been modified to resemble enemy tanks and APCs, such as the T-80 and BMP-2. Besides being significantly cheaper and easier to maintain, one of the advantages of the M113 is that the infantry squad can now ride inside the simulated BMP instead of in a truck accompanying a tank masquerading as one, as was often the case with the M551s.

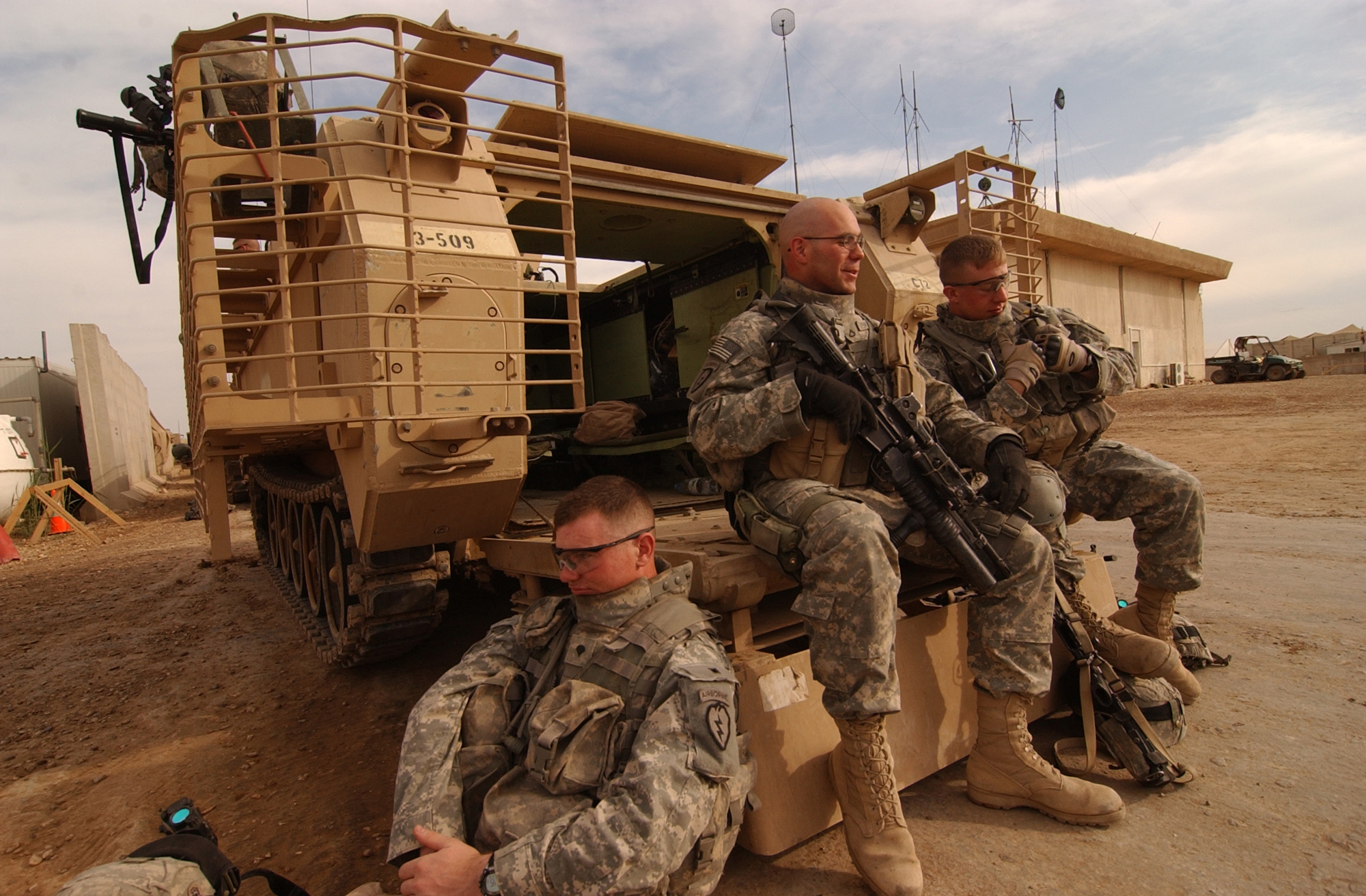
In March 2007, a group of U.S. Army soldiers sit on the rear ramp of an M113 at Forward Operating Base Kalsu, Iraq.

=== Nicknames ===
The M113 has received a variety of nicknames over the years. The South Vietnamese Army (ARVN) called it the "green dragon". United States troops tended to refer to the M113 simply as a "113" (spoken as "one-one-three"), or a "track". The Israel Defense Forces employ the M113 in many different variants, all designed in Israel, and have given each of them official names, from the baseline "Bardelas" (lit. Cheetah) to the "Nagmash" (Hebrew acronym equivalent to "APC"), "Nagman", and "Kasman" variants for urban combat up to the "Zelda" and "Zelda 2", which are fitted with ERA-suites.

The Australian Army refers to its M113A1s as "buckets", "bush taxis" and modified M113A1s fitted with 76 mm turrets as "beasts". The German Army has various nicknames, depending on location and branch of service, including "elephant shoe", "Tank Wedge" and "bathtub". In Spain's Army it is known as "TOA", the acronym of Transporte Oruga Acorazado, which is Spanish for Armored Tracked Carrier. In the Ukrainian Army it is called "Emka" (M).

== Design ==
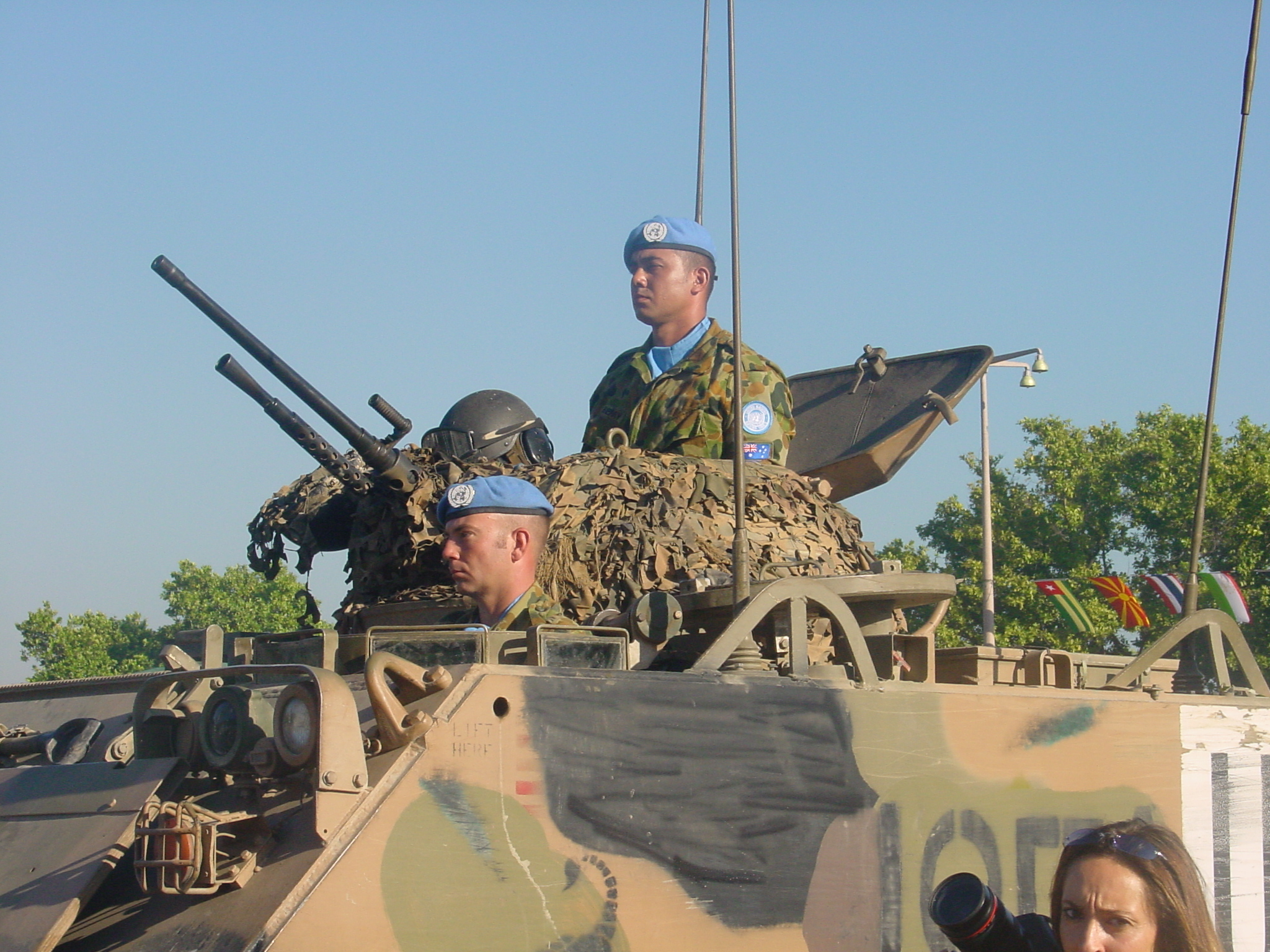
Australian M113A1 with the Cadillac Gage T50 turret fitted with twin mounted M1919 Browning and M2 Browning QCB machine guns.

=== Armament ===
The basic M113 armored personnel carrier can be fitted with a number of weapon systems. The most common weapon fit is a single .50 caliber M2 machine gun. However, the mount can also be fitted with a 40 mm Mk 19 automatic grenade launcher. A number of anti-tank weapons could be fitted to the standard variant: the U.S. Army developed kits that allowed the M47 Dragon and BGM-71 TOW anti-tank missile systems to be mounted.

In the case of the M47, the system mated to the existing machine gun mount, without having to remove the machine gun. This allowed the commander to use both weapons. A large array of turrets and fixed mounts are available to mount high explosive cannon ranging from 20 mm to 105 mm on to the M113 series, making them function as assault guns and fire support; while in many cases still having room inside to carry dismounted infantry or cavalry scouts.

=== Armor ===
The M113 is built of 5083 aircraft-quality aluminum alloy. Aluminum alloy is lighter than steel but requires around three times the thickness for an equivalent level of ballistic protection, meaning the armor of the M113 was only designed for 7.62 mm and shell splinter protection. All variants of the M113 are capable of mounting anti-landmine applique armor. The M113A3 was upgraded with internal spall liners and armored fuel tanks. In comparison, a modern APC such as the Stryker has all-around 7.62 mm armor-piercing protection, plus 14.5 mm protection on the front, sides, and rear, and a protection against antipersonnel mines.

=== Mobility ===
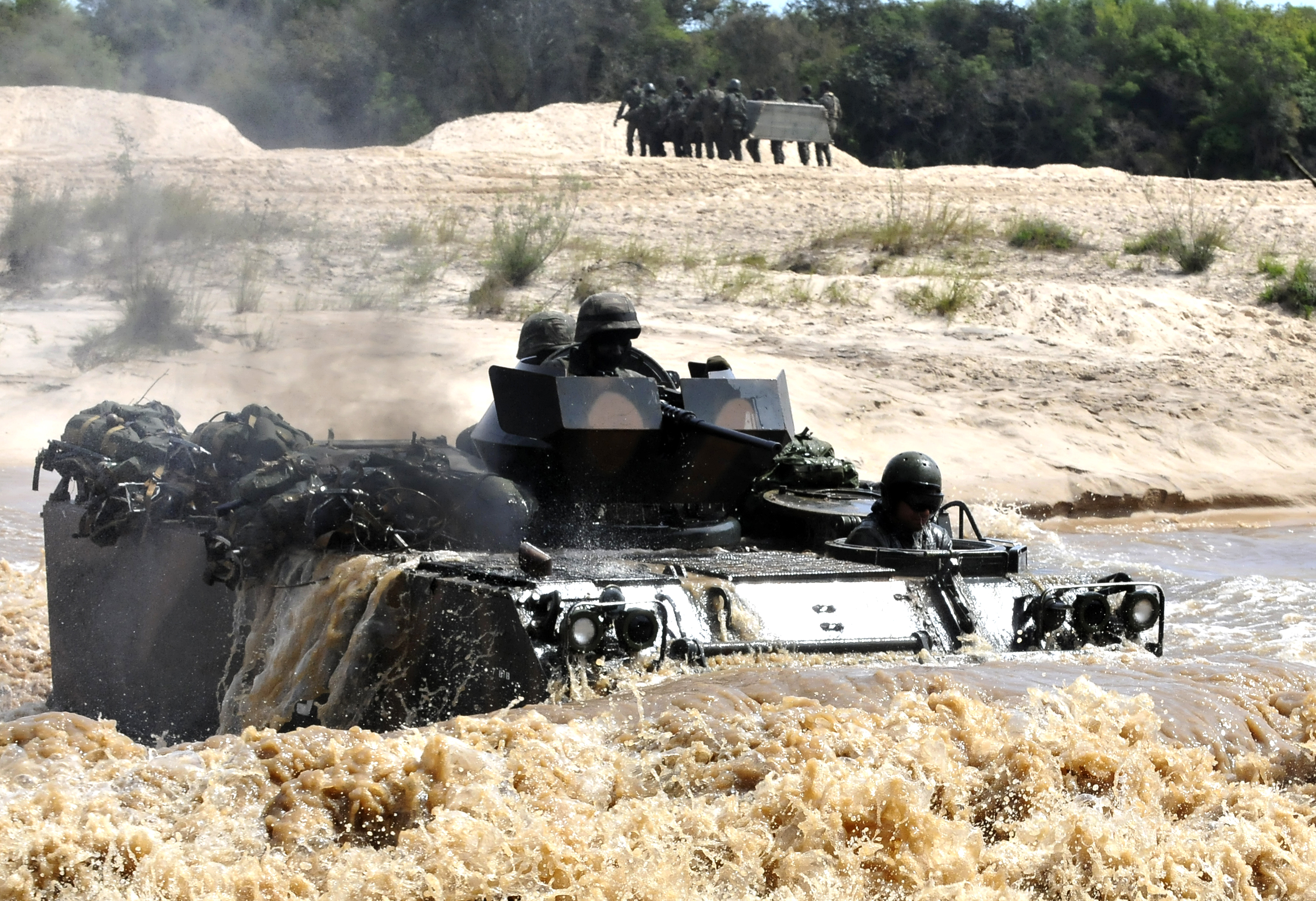
Brazilian M113 during a water crossing

Its weight allows the use of a relatively small engine to power the vehicle, a Detroit 6V53 V6 two-stroke diesel engine of 318 cubic inches (5,210 cc) with an Allison TX-100-1 three-speed automatic transmission. This allows the vehicle to carry a large payload cross-country and to be transported by fixed- and rotary-wing aircraft. Original production M113s can swim without deploying flotation curtains, using only a front-mounted trim vane; they are propelled in the water by their tracks.

== Operational history ==
=== Vietnam ===
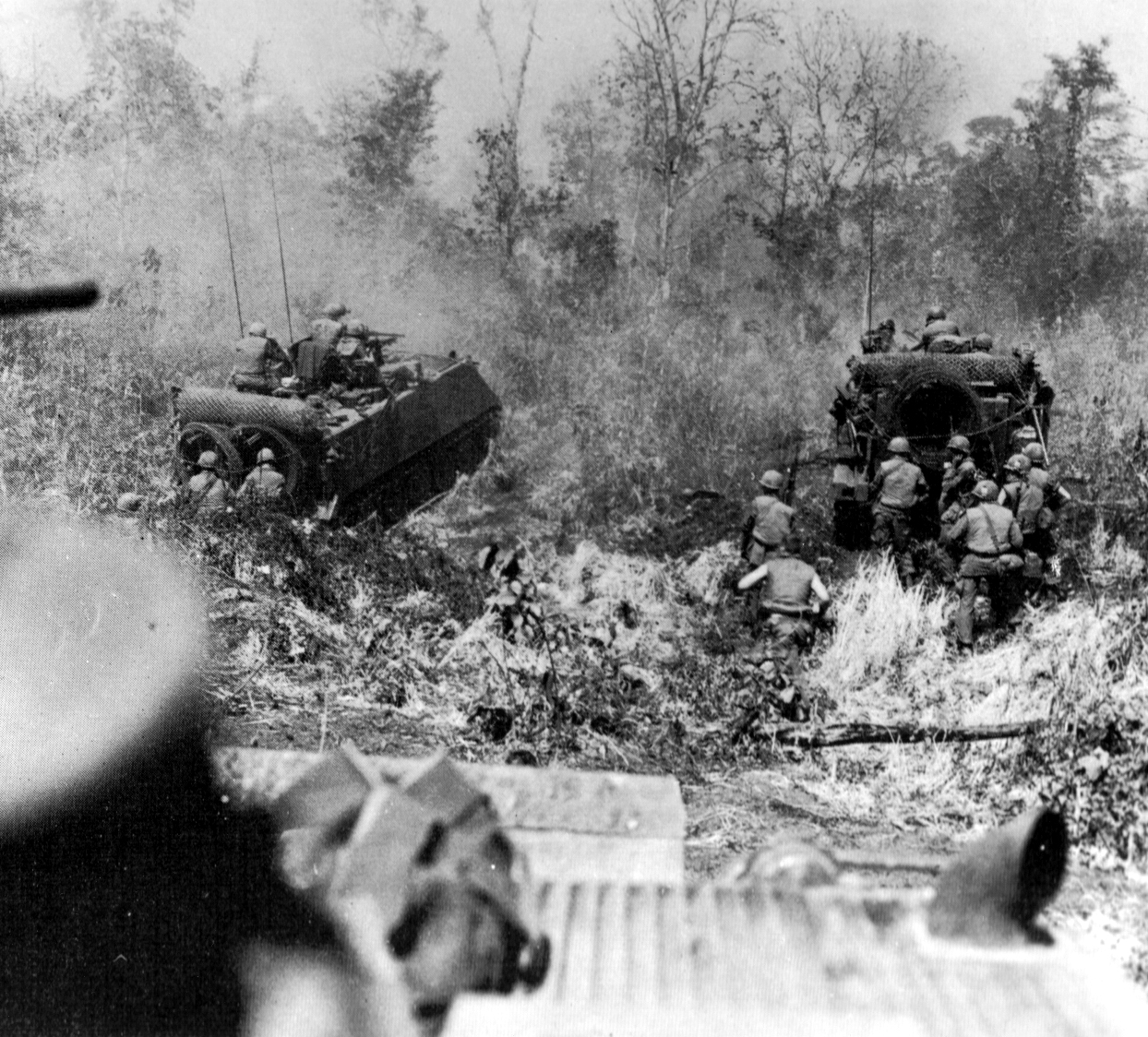
A combined arms operation in Vietnam. M113s clear the way through heavy bushes while infantry follows.

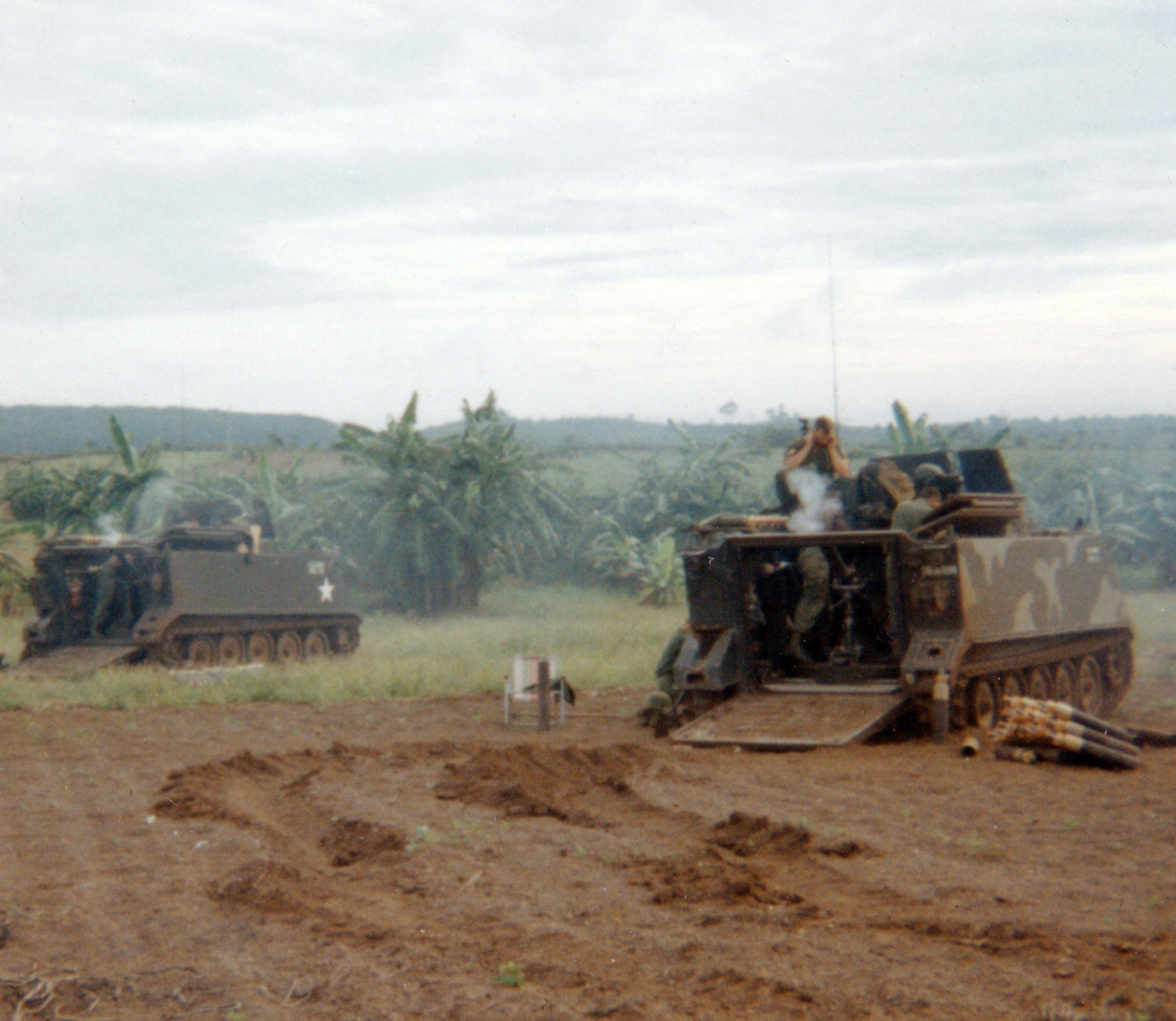
The 4.2" Mortar Platoon of D/16 Armor, 173rd Airborne, on a fire mission in Operation Waco in Vietnam

The Vietnam War was the first combat opportunity for mechanized infantry, a technically new type of infantry with its roots in the armored infantry of World War II, now using the M113 armored personnel carrier. In addition, armored cavalry squadrons in Vietnam consisted largely of M113s, after replacing the intended M114 in a variety of roles, and armor battalions contained M113s within their headquarters companies, such as the maintenance section, medical section, vehicle recovery section, mortar section, and the scout (reconnaissance) section. United States Army mechanized infantry units in Vietnam were fully equipped with the M113 APC/ACAV, which consisted of one headquarters company and three line companies, normally with an authorized strength of approximately 900 men. Ten U.S. mechanized infantry battalions were deployed to Vietnam from 1965 until their departure in 1972. (Note: 2/2nd Mechanized Infantry, 1/5th Mechanized Infantry, 2/8th Mechanized Infantry, 1/16th Mechanized Infantry, 2/22nd Mechanized Infantry, 4/23rd Mechanized Infantry, 2/47th Mechanized Infantry, 1/50th Mechanized Infantry, 5/60th Mechanized Infantry, 1/61st Mechanized Infantry, and the 1st Brigade, 5th Infantry Division (Mechanized). The U.S. Army 1st Brigade, 5th (Mech) Infantry Division, in Vietnam was not composed of strictly mechanized infantry battalions. The 5th (M) ID (1st Bde), consisted of: the 5/4th Field Artillery, 1/11th Light Infantry (straight leg-no armored vehicles), 1/77th Armor (M48 Patton tanks), 1/61st Mechanized Infantry, A Troop 4/12th Armored Cavalry (only one troop of cavalry), and the 3/5th Armored Cavalry OPCON (operationally controlled) /attached from the 9th Infantry Division. The one troop of the 12th Armored Cavalry and the full squadron of the 5th Armored Cavalry were equipped with M551 Sheridan and M113 ACAV.)

==== Company D, 16th Armor ====
Company D, 16th Armor, 173rd Airborne Brigade, was the first U.S. Army armor unit deployed to Vietnam. It originally consisted of three platoons of M113s and a platoon of 90 mm M56 Scorpion self-propelled anti-tank guns (SPAT). It was the only independent armor company in the history of the U.S. Army. Upon the company's arrival in Vietnam, a fourth line platoon was added; this unit was equipped with M106 4.2 in. mortar carriers (modified M113s).

The mortar platoon often operated with Brigade infantry units to provide indirect fire support. It also deployed at times as a dismounted infantry unit. The remaining SPAT platoon was reequipped with M113s in late 1966 and the mortar platoon was deactivated in early 1967. From early 1967, D/16th had three line platoons equipped with M113s and, eventually, its diesel version, the M113A1. It was also standardized in late 1968 with three machine guns per track, one M2 .50 caliber and two M60 machine guns mounted on each side.

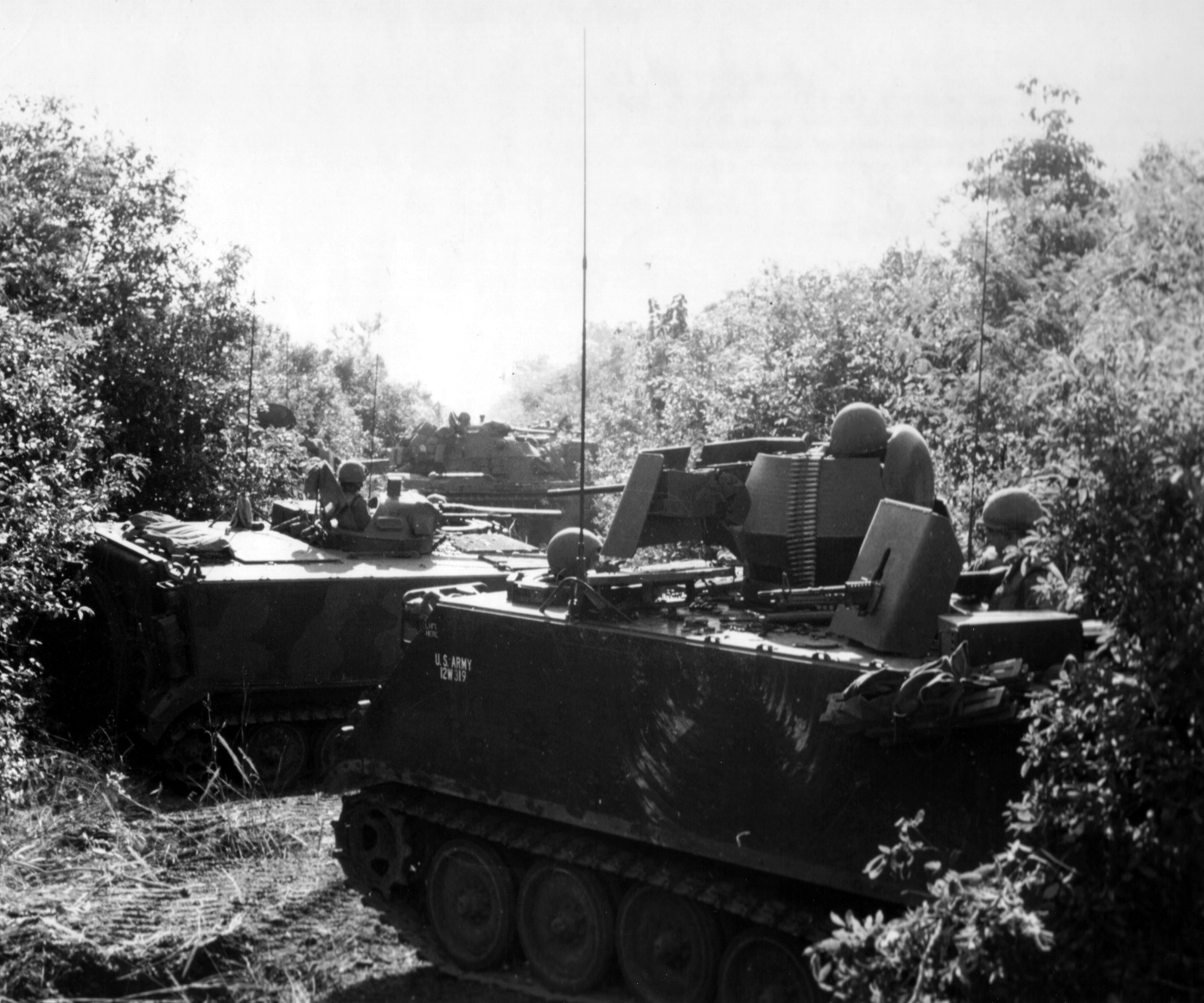
ACAVs of the 3rd Squadron 11th Armored Cavalry assume a herringbone formation during Operation Cedar Falls.

==== General usage in combat ====
The M113s were instrumental in conducting reconnaissance in force (RIFs), search and destroy missions, and large invasions (incursions) such as the U.S. invasion of Cambodia on 1 May 1970 and later Laos (Operation Lam Son 719) in 1971, all of which used the M113 as the primary workhorse for moving the ground armies. While operating with cavalry and armor units, the M113s often worked in conjunction with U.S. M48 Patton and M551 Sheridan tanks. During the Vietnam War, U.S. Army gun trucks, along with V-100 armored cars, conducted convoy escorts for military traffic.

The USAF used M113 and M113A1 ACAV vehicles in USAF security police squadrons, which provided air base ground defense support in Vietnam. Also, M113s were supplied to the ARVN. One notable ARVN unit equipped with the M113 APC, the 3d Armored Cavalry Squadron, earned the Presidential Unit Citation. Additional M113s were supplied to the Cambodian Khmer National Armed Forces, equipped with a turret for the machine gun and a M40 recoilless rifle mounted on the roof.

The Australian Army also used the M113 in Vietnam. After initial experiences showed that the crew commander was too vulnerable to fire, the Australians tried a number of different gun shields and turrets, eventually standardizing with the Cadillac-Gage T-50 turret fitted with two .30 cal Browning machine guns, or a single .30-single .50 combination. Other turrets were tried as were various gun shields, the main design of which was similar to the gun shield used on the U.S. M113 ACAV version.

In addition, the Australians operated an M113 variant fitted with a Saladin armored car turret, with a 76 mm gun as a fire support vehicle, or FSV, for infantry fire support. This has now also been removed from service.

Subsequent to Vietnam all Australian M113 troop carriers were fitted with the T50 turret. The FSV was eventually phased out and replaced with a modernized version known as an "MRV" (medium reconnaissance vehicle). The MRV featured a Scorpion turret with 76 mm gun, improved fire control, and passive night vision equipment.

Regiments using the M113 included former Citizens' Military Forces (CMF) units like the 4/19th Prince of Wales Light Horse Regiment (armoured reconnaissance) and Regular units such as 2nd Cavalry Regiment (armoured reconnaissance) and 3rd/4th Cavalry Regiment (APC Regiment). An Armoured Reconnaissance Troop consisted of Alpha Track – Charlie Track (M113 LRV) Bravo – Delta Track (M113 MRV) Echo Track (M113 APC) with Assault Section (armoured infantry) later known as Scouts.

Light reconnaissance vehicle (LRV) – 50/30 cal MG in Cadillac-Gage T-50 turret
Armoured personnel carrier (APC) – 30/30 cal MG in Cadillac-Gage T-50 turret
Medium reconnaissance vehicle (MRV) – Saladin turret (later Scorpion turret) – formerly known as a fire support vehicle

The ARVN also used M113 armored personnel carriers. Between November 1967 and March 1970, the US and ARVN forces lost no less than 1,342 M113s to landmines alone (excluding the vehicle were lost by recoilless rifles or RPGs) In 1975, 1381 ARVN M113s were destroyed and captured. Losses in other years are unknown. In total, the U.S., ARVN and Australia lost about 8,000 M113s during the Vietnam war.

=== Israel ===
The IDF are the second largest user of the M113 after the United States, with over 6,000 of the vehicles in service.

In 1967 some Jordanian M113s were captured in the West Bank during the Six-Day War and were integrated into the Israeli Army. In 1970 Israel started to receive M113A1 to replace the antiquated half-tracks. The IDF M113s were armed with M2 HB machine guns, and two MAG 7.62 mm machine guns on either side of the upper crew compartment door.

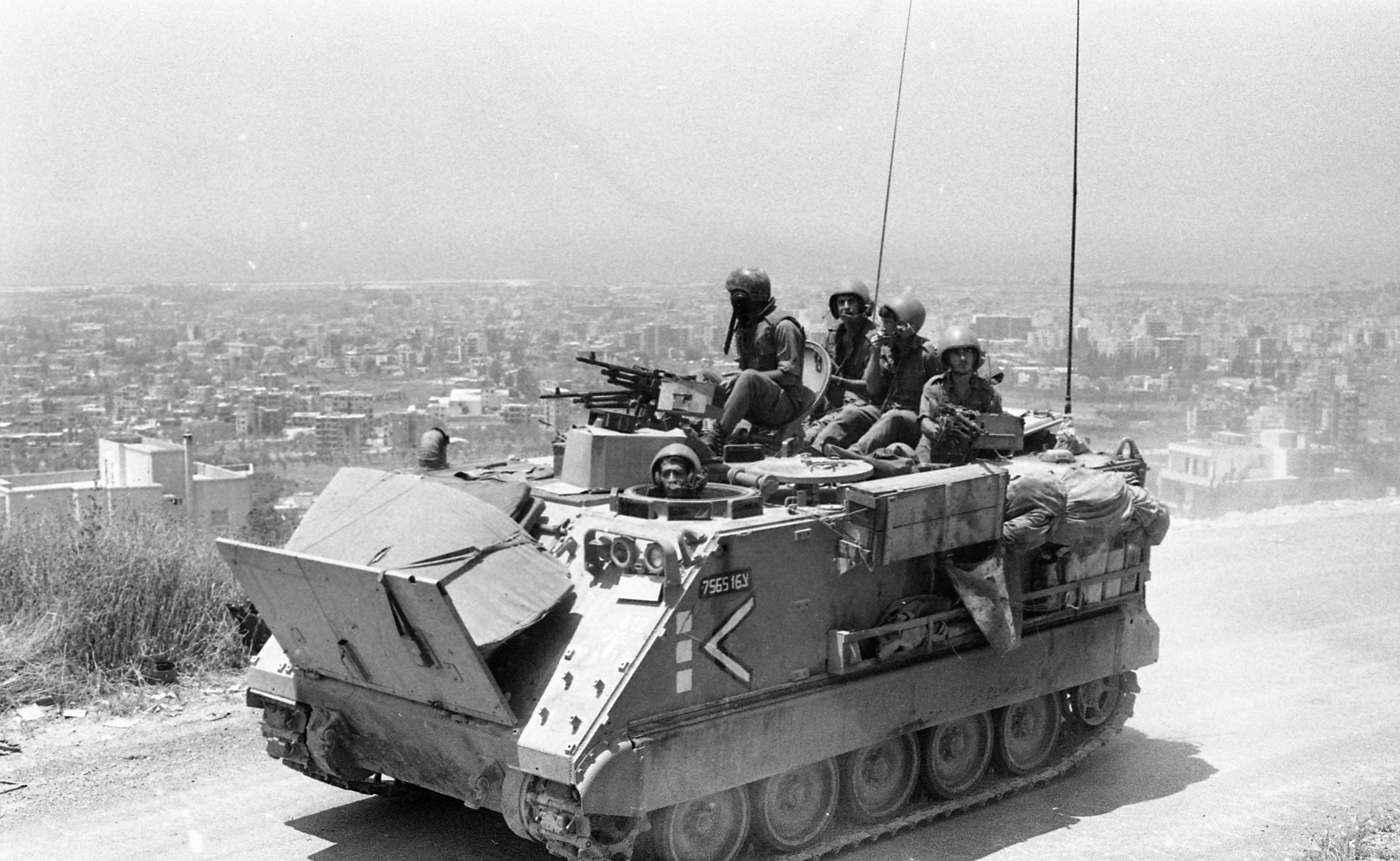
An Israeli M113 variant in Lebanon, 1984

The M113 took part in the Yom Kippur War in October 1973, when the IDF was equipped with 448 M113s that saw action on the Sinai and Golan fronts. They proved inadequate for direct fighting due to their poor armor protection. In the Battle of Buq'atta most of the 7th Recon Company was wiped out while trying to assault Syrian commandos with their M113s.

They were used by the IDF in the 1978 South Lebanon conflict. In the 1982 Lebanon War, they saw heavy action. PLO ambushes with RPGs caused extensive casualties because of the tendency of the M113's aluminum armor to catch on fire after being hit by anti-tank weapons. Israeli infantrymen being ferried by M113s learned to quickly dismount and fight on foot when engaged.

By the time of the Siege of Beirut, M113s were only used to carry supplies to the frontline, always stopping at least 100 meters from enemy lines. M113s were subsequently used by both the IDF and the South Lebanon Army during the South Lebanon conflict.

The IDF utilized M113s during the First Intifada and the Second Intifada. In May 2004, two fully laden IDF M113s were destroyed by IEDs in the Gaza Strip, killing 11 soldiers, all those inside the vehicles on both occasions. This became known in Israel as the "APC disaster". The vulnerability of the M113 armored personnel carrier to IEDs and RPGs led the IDF to later begin to develop the Namer APC. M113s were used again in the 2006 Lebanon War and Operation Cast Lead.

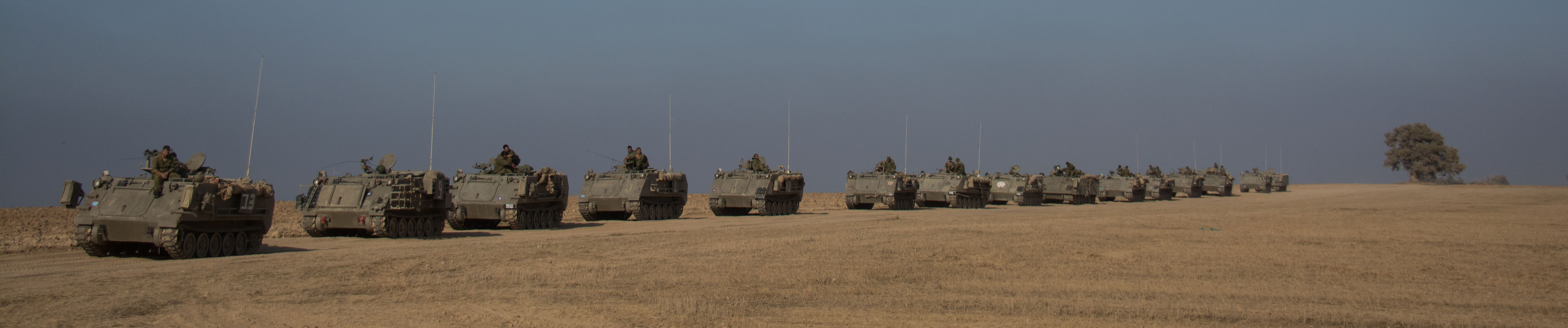
Column of Israeli M113s approaching Gaza, during Operation Protective Edge in 2014.

In 2014, during the first wave of the IDF's ground incursion into Gaza in Operation Protective Edge, a Hamas RPG-29 destroyed a fully loaded M113 in Gaza during the Battle of Shuja'iyya, killing all seven Golani Brigade soldiers inside the vehicle. As a result, the IDF faced calls from the Israeli public to build more Namer APCs over the next decade and to gradually reduce the number of M113s used in its future combat operations. A group of 30 Israeli reserve soldiers subsequently notified their commanders that they would refuse to enter the Gaza Strip in M113s.

M113s were fielded in Palestine and Lebanon during the Gaza war. On 15 June 2024, eight soldiers were killed, possibly due to a detonation of the explosives carried on the exterior of their M113. On 24 June 2024, Al-Qassam Brigades published footage of its forces attacking an M113 using a Chinese HJ-8 ATGM, hitting the vehicle, caused an external fire on the carry-on CARPET demining system.

The Israel Defense Forces still operates large numbers of the M113, maintaining a fleet of 6,000 of the vehicles. On numerous occasions since their introduction in the late 1960s, the IDF's M113s have proven vulnerable to modern anti-tank missiles, IEDs, and RPGs, resulting in the deaths of many Israeli soldiers riding inside the vehicles. The IDF has nonetheless been unable to replace the use of them in combat operations, due to budget constraints in equipping its large mechanized infantry regiments.

Israel is prototyping the Eitan (Hebrew for steadfast), an eight-wheeled armored fighting vehicle to replace their M113s. Designed to serve alongside the tracked Namer, the Eitan is planned to be cheaper and lighter, at 35 tons, incorporating an active protection system and a turret. They are expected to begin replacing the M113 starting in 2020. However, due to the slow rate of production of replacement APCs, the IDF is expected to be dependent on the M113 well into the 2020s. The IDF has also increased production of Namer APCs to replace the M113.

In May 2025 Israel's Ministry of Defense announced a call for tender to sell 5,000 M-113s in an "as is" condition.

==== VBIED use ====
Several disabled Zelda APCs in Nabatieh, Lebanon and Gaza have revealed VBIED use by the IDF, where the vehicles are filled with explosives, towed to their target, and detonated. An unknown number of M113s were converted into Unmanned Ground Vehicles and were observed to be acting as VBIEDs in Rafah. In November 2024 IAI showed videos of unmanned M113 units working with unmanned D9 bulldozers in what appeared to be Gaza as an example of its new teaming system for robotic units.

=== Law enforcement ===
In the United States, M113s have been adopted by numerous law enforcement agencies. An M113 belonging to the Midland County Sheriff's Department was used in the 2008 raid of the Fundamentalist Church of Jesus Christ of Latter Day Saints compound.

The Brazilian Marine Corps's M113s were used in joint operations with Batalhão de Operações Policiais Especiais during the 2010 raid on Complexo do Alemão.

=== Ukraine ===
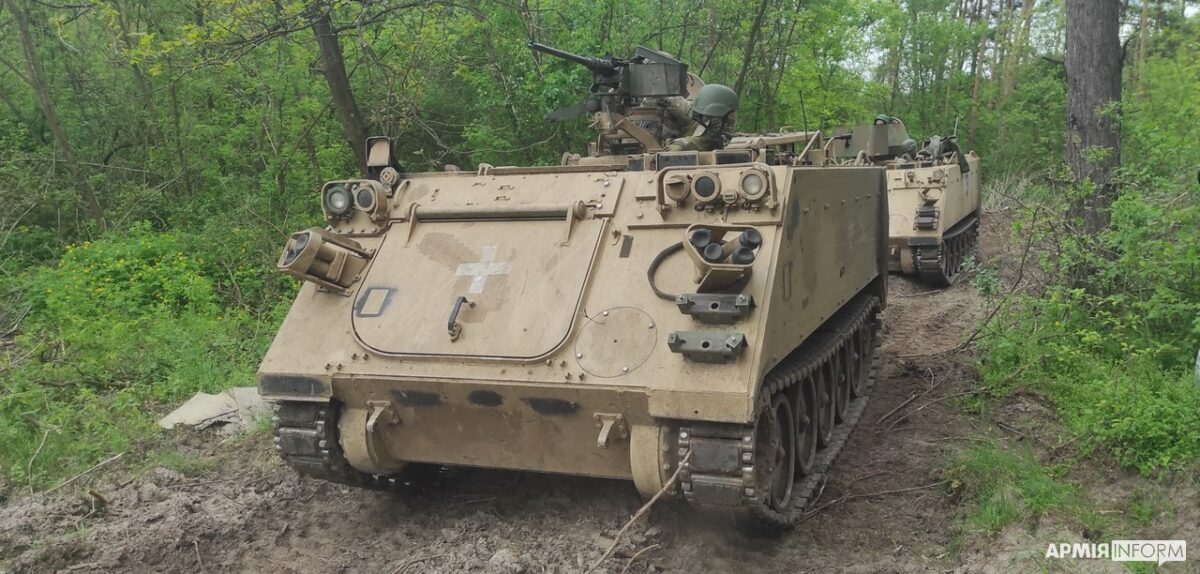
Two M113s in the service of the Ukrainian Marine Corps.

M113s were sent by the United States and several Western world countries to Ukraine during the Russo-Ukrainian War. They are currently being used by Ukrainian forces alongside other combat vehicles donated to Ukraine.

Some M113s that were captured in Bakhmut were used by Wagner contractors for personnel transport.

=== U.S. Army replacement plans ===
The U.S. Army stopped buying M113s in 2007, with 6,000 vehicles remaining in the inventory.

The M113 will be replaced in U.S. Army service by the Armored Multi-Purpose Vehicle (AMPV) program. 2,897 AMPVs, configured for five mission roles, are set to replace M113s at the brigade level and below within armored brigade combat teams. However, the AMPV program is not developing a vehicle to replace the M113 in supporting echelons above brigade level; this vehicle will have different requirements.

BAE Systems proposed a turretless variant of the Bradley Fighting Vehicle as the AMPV. In December 2014, the U.S. Army selected BAE proposal, the only proposal it received, to replace over 2,800 M113s in service.

As of 2013, five variants of the AMPV are planned: M1283 General Purpose (522 planned), M1284 Medical Evacuation Vehicle (790 planned), M1285 Medical Treatment Vehicle (216 planned) and M1286 Mission Command (993 planned).

The AMPVs are to be produced at a rate of around 180 vehicles per year, enough to equip 1.3 armored brigades. With 12 brigades to modernize, the M113 is not planned to be entirely replaced in armored brigades until the late 2020s. With studies on what vehicle to replace M113s with in rear-echelon units ongoing, the M113 is not likely to be phased out of U.S. Army service until after 2030, over 70 years after entering service.

== Variants ==
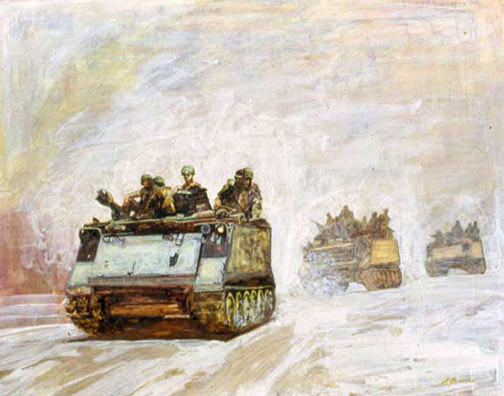
APC by David E. Graves, Vietnam Combat Artists Program. Courtesy of the National Museum of the U.S. Army.

M113
Original version, powered by 209 hp (156 kW) Chrysler 75M V8 gasoline engine.

M113A1
Starting in 1964, the gasoline engine was replaced with a 215 hp (160 kW) 6V-53 Detroit Diesel engine, to take advantage of the better fuel economy and the reduced fire hazard of the diesel engine. The suffix A1 was used on all variants to denote a diesel engine, i.e. an M106A1 was an M106 mortar carrier equipped with a diesel engine.

M113A2
In 1979, further upgrades were introduced. Engine cooling was improved by switching the locations of the fan and radiator. Higher-strength torsion bars increased ground clearance, and shock absorbers reduced the effects of ground strikes. The weight of the M113A2 was increased to 11,740 kilograms (25,880 lb). Because the added weight affected its freeboard when afloat, it was no longer required to be amphibious. Four-tube smoke grenade launchers were also added. The suffix A2 is used on all variants to denote upgrade to A2 standard.

M113A3
In 1987, further improvements for "enhanced (battlefield) survival" were introduced. This included a yoke for steering instead of laterals, a brake pedal, a more powerful engine (the turbocharged 6V-53T Detroit Diesel), and internal spall liners for improved protection. Armored fuel tanks were added externally on both sides of the rear ramp, freeing up 0.45 cubic metres (16 ft^{3}) of internal space. The suffix A3 is used on all variants to denote upgrade to A3 standard.

	M113	M113A1	M113A2	M113A3
Overall length	191.5 in (4.9 m)		208.5 in (5.3 m) w/ external fuel tanks, 191.5 in (4.9 m) w/o	208.5 in (5.3 m)
Overall width	105.75 in (2.7 m)			
Height over machine gun	98.25 in (2.5 m)		99.25 in (2.5 m)	
Ground clearance	16.1 in (40.9 cm)		17.1 in (43.4 cm)	
Top speed	40 mph (64 km/h)			
Fording	Floats			Restricted to 40 in (101.6 cm)
Max. grade	60%			
Max. trench	5.5 ft (1.7 m)			
Max. wall	24 in (0.6 m)			
Range	200 mi (320 km)	300 mi (480 km)		
Power	215 hp (160 kW) at 4000 rpm	212 hp (158 kW) at 2800 rpm		275 hp (205 kW) at 2800 rpm
Power-to-weight ratio	18.8 hp/ST (15.5 kW/t)	17.6 hp/ST (14.5 kW/t)	17.0 hp/ST (14.0 kW/t) (w/o external tanks)	20.2 hp/ST (16.6 kW/t) (w/o applique armor)
Torque	332 lb⋅ft (450 N⋅m) at 2800 rpm	492 lb⋅ft (670 N⋅m) at 1300 rpm		627 lb⋅ft (850 N⋅m) at 1600 rpm
Weight, combat loaded	22,900 lb (10,390 kg)	24,080 lb (10,920 kg)	25,000 lb (11,340 kg)	27,200 lb (12,340 kg) (w/o applique)
Ground pressure	7.3 psi (50 kPa)	7.6 psi (52 kPa)	7.9 psi (54 kPa)	7.9 psi (54 kPa)
Main armament	M2 Browning machine gun			

=== Derivatives ===
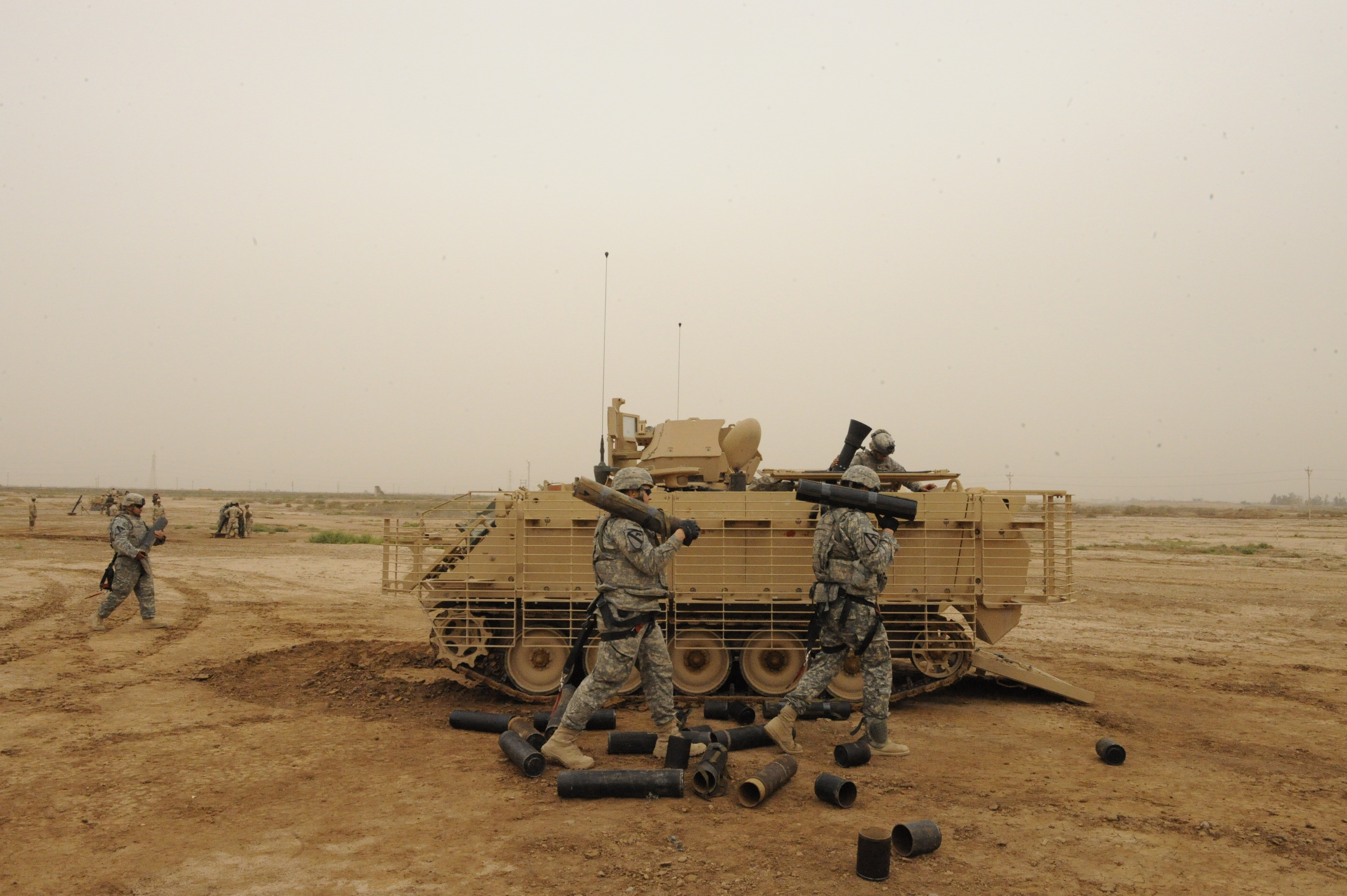
U.S. soldiers fire the M120 Mortar system out of an M113 at Camp Taji, Iraq, 2009.

A large number of vehicles have taken inspiration from the running gear of the M113, and many creations such as APCs to tactical ballistic missile launchers have been made with its design in mind. The M113 has become one of the most prolific armored vehicles of the second half of the 20th century, and continues to serve with armies around the world into the 21st century.

M58 Wolf system
A smokescreen generator vehicle

M106 mortar carrier

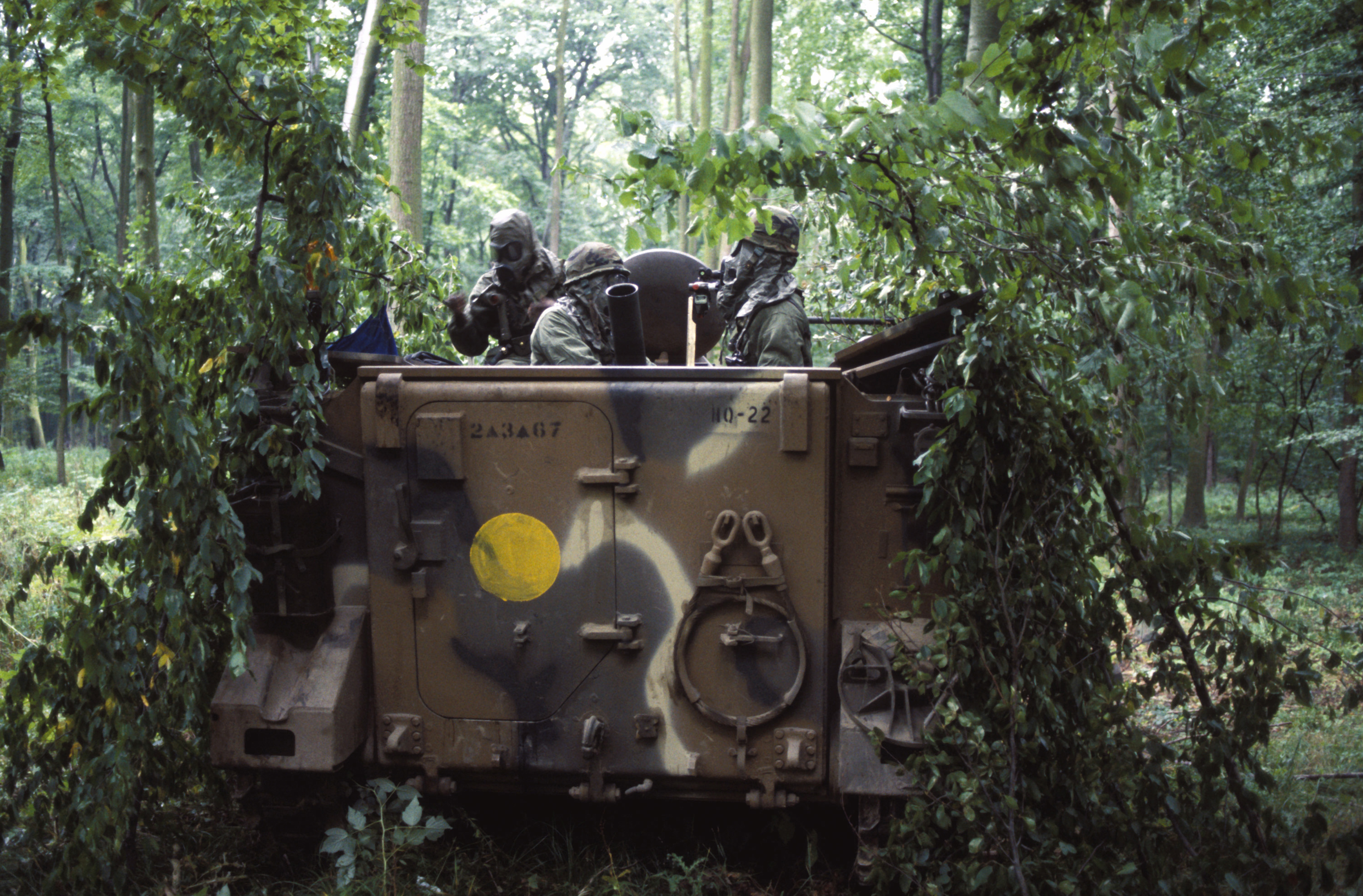
M106 mortar carrier and crew outfitted in NBC protective gear during Exercise Reforger '85, Germany.

A mortar carrier armed with an M30 mortar 106.7 mm (4.2-inch, or "Four-deuce") mounted on a turntable in the rear troop compartment. On this variant, the single hatch over the rear troop compartment was exchanged for a three-part circular hatch. The mortar could be fired from the vehicle, but could also be fired dismounted. Currently, the U.S. Army mortar carrier is the M106 upgraded to A3 standard and armed with an M121 120 mm mortar, a variant of the M120 mortar.

M1064 mortar carrier
Armed with an M121 120 mm mortar, a variant of the M120 mortar.

M125
Mortar carrier, basically an M106 armed with an M29 81 mm mortar.

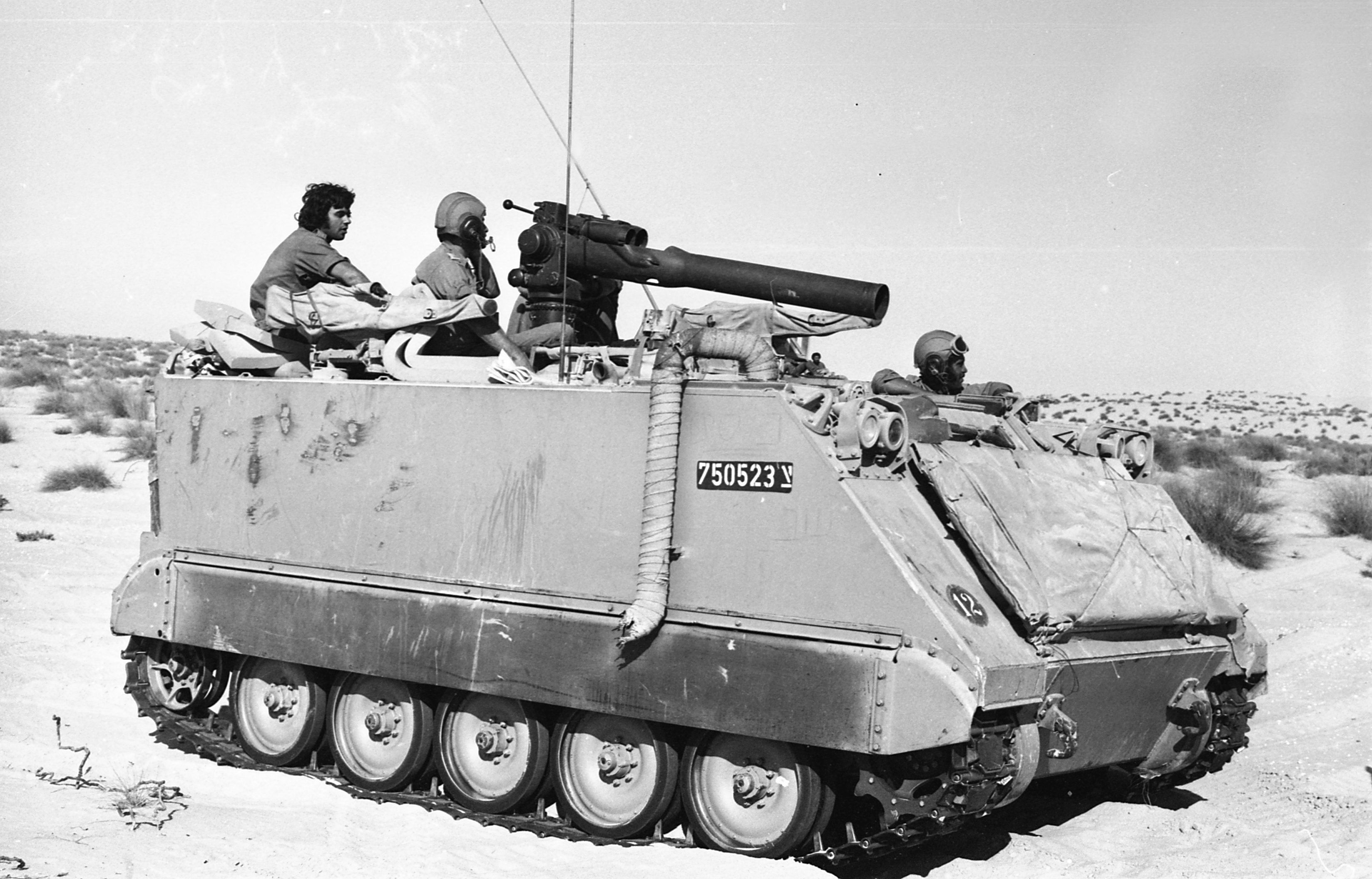
Israeli M150 with Improved TOW (I-TOW) anti-tank guided missile launcher.

M132 armored flamethrower
Variant equipped with a turret armed with a flamethrower and a .50 caliber machine gun. These vehicles are no longer used by the U.S. Army. Vehicles upgraded to A1 standard were known as "M132A1s".

M150
Anti-tank variant equipped with a TOW ATGM launcher.

M163 VADS
Self-propelled variant of the M167 VADS short-range air-defense system, mounting an M61 Vulcan cannon with a radar rangefinder and 2,100 rounds of ammunition on a modified M113 chassis (M741 carrier).

M48 Chaparral
Anti-aircraft variant equipped with a launcher armed with four MIM-72A/M48 Chaparral missiles.

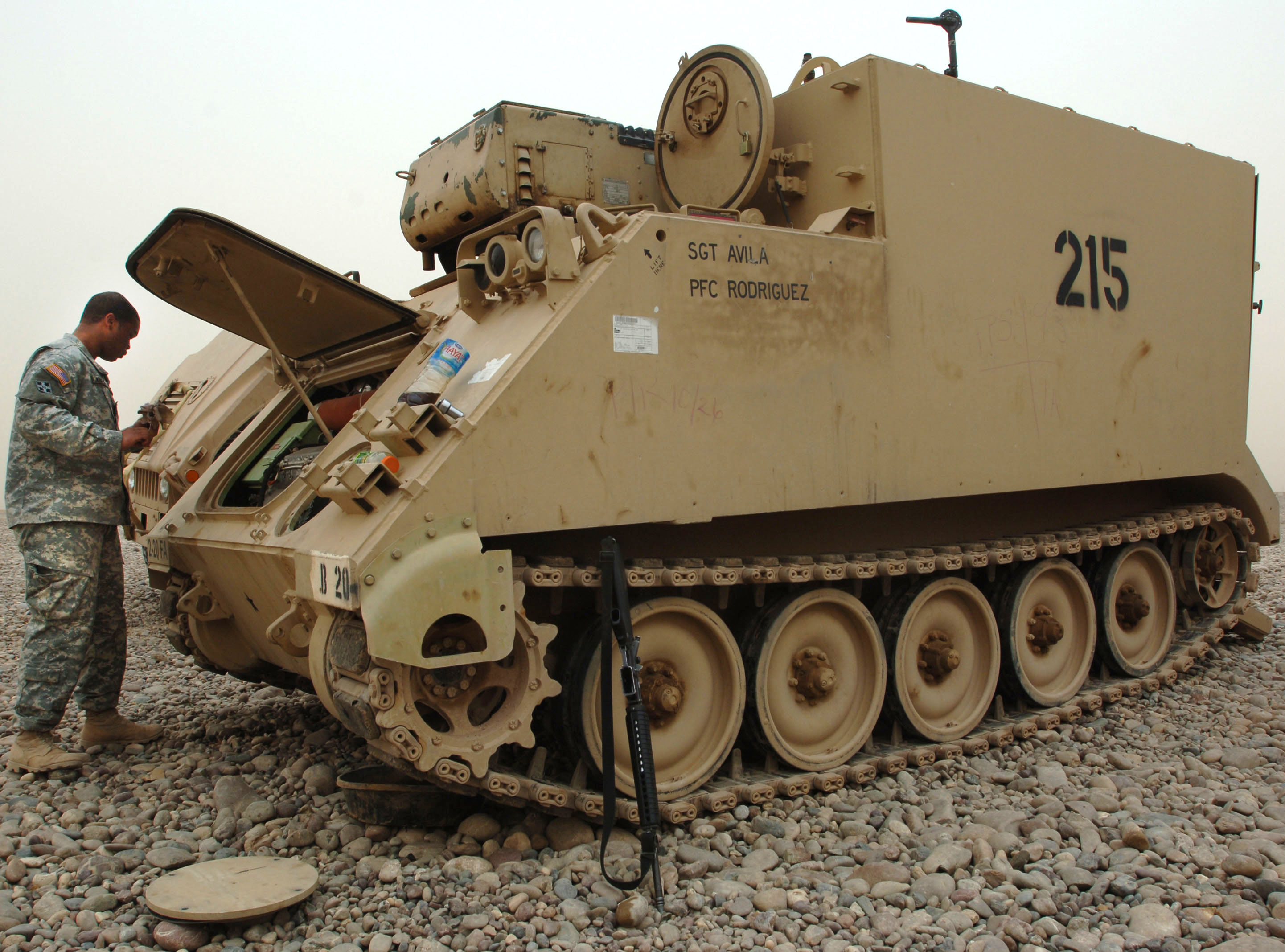
M577 undergoing maintenance

M548
Unarmored cargo carrier equipped with a rear cargo bed.

M577 command post carrier
Command variant, the roof over the rear troop compartment is higher. The vehicle also carries additional radios and a generator. A variant of this is the M1068 standard integrated command post system carrier, equipped with the newest U.S. Army automated command and control system.

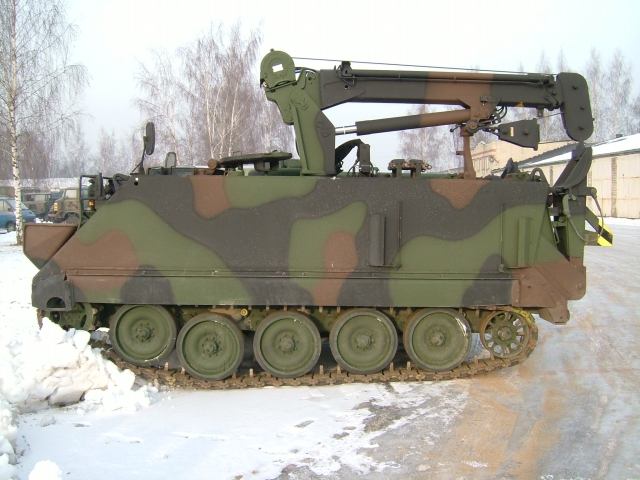
Lithuanian Army M113 fitter and repair vehicle.

M579
A fitter and repair vehicle equipped with a crane. This vehicle was not taken into U.S. Army service.

M806
Repair and recovery vehicle equipped with an internal winch and two earth anchors mounted on the rear hull.

M901 ITV (improved TOW vehicle)
Equipped with a launcher armed with two TOW missiles.

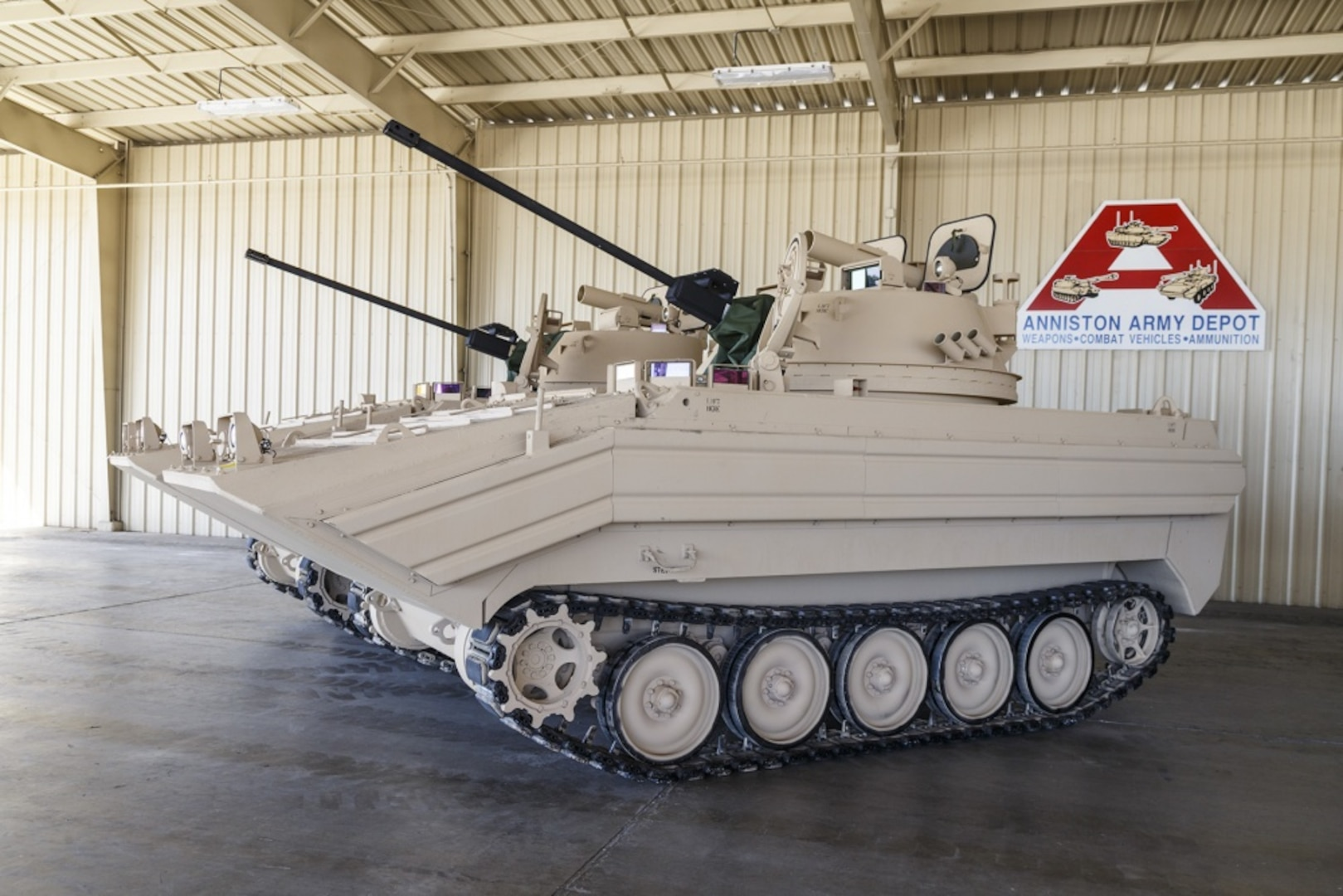
M113A3/BMP-2 OSVs at the Anniston Army Depot.

M113A3, Opposing Forces, Surrogate Vehicle (OSV) - (NTC)
A variant of the M113 fitted with a modified Bradley turret as part of a vismod package for training. This variant features MILES gear, a MGSS/TWGSS system, and inert decorative ERA. Versions include a Russian BMP-2 and a T-80 MBT.

M113 "C&R" (command and reconnaissance)

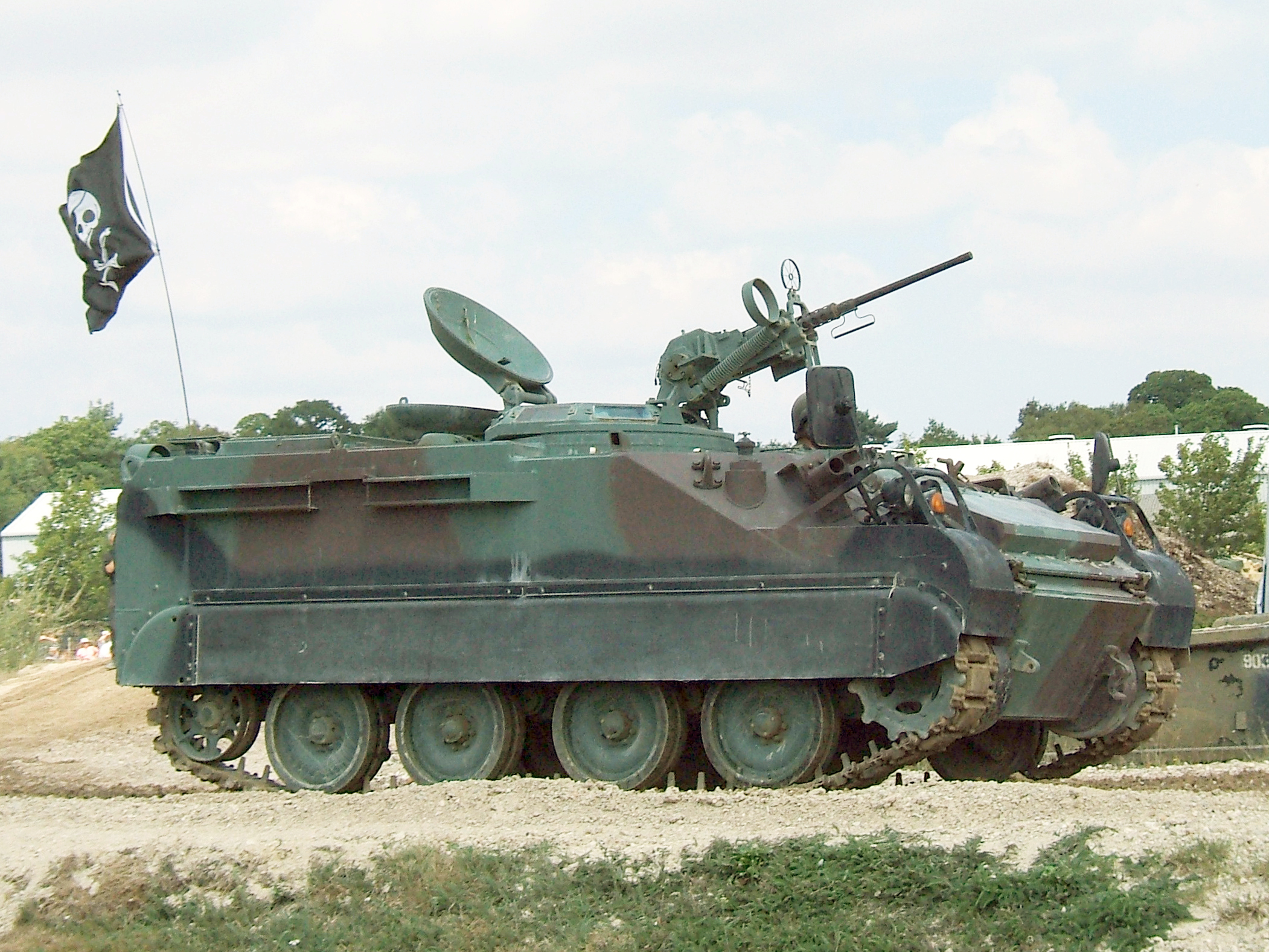
M113 C&R/Lynx Recon vehicle

A lowered and shortened version of the M113 developed for the Netherlands. It was used for reconnaissance duties with cavalry battalions and armored engineer companies. It had four road wheels on either side. The engine was moved to the rear of the vehicle although the drive sprockets were maintained at the front. Armament was a 25 mm cannon in a remotely operated turret. Crew consisted of commander, driver and gunner. It has also been used by the Canadian Army as the Lynx reconnaissance vehicle.

AIFV

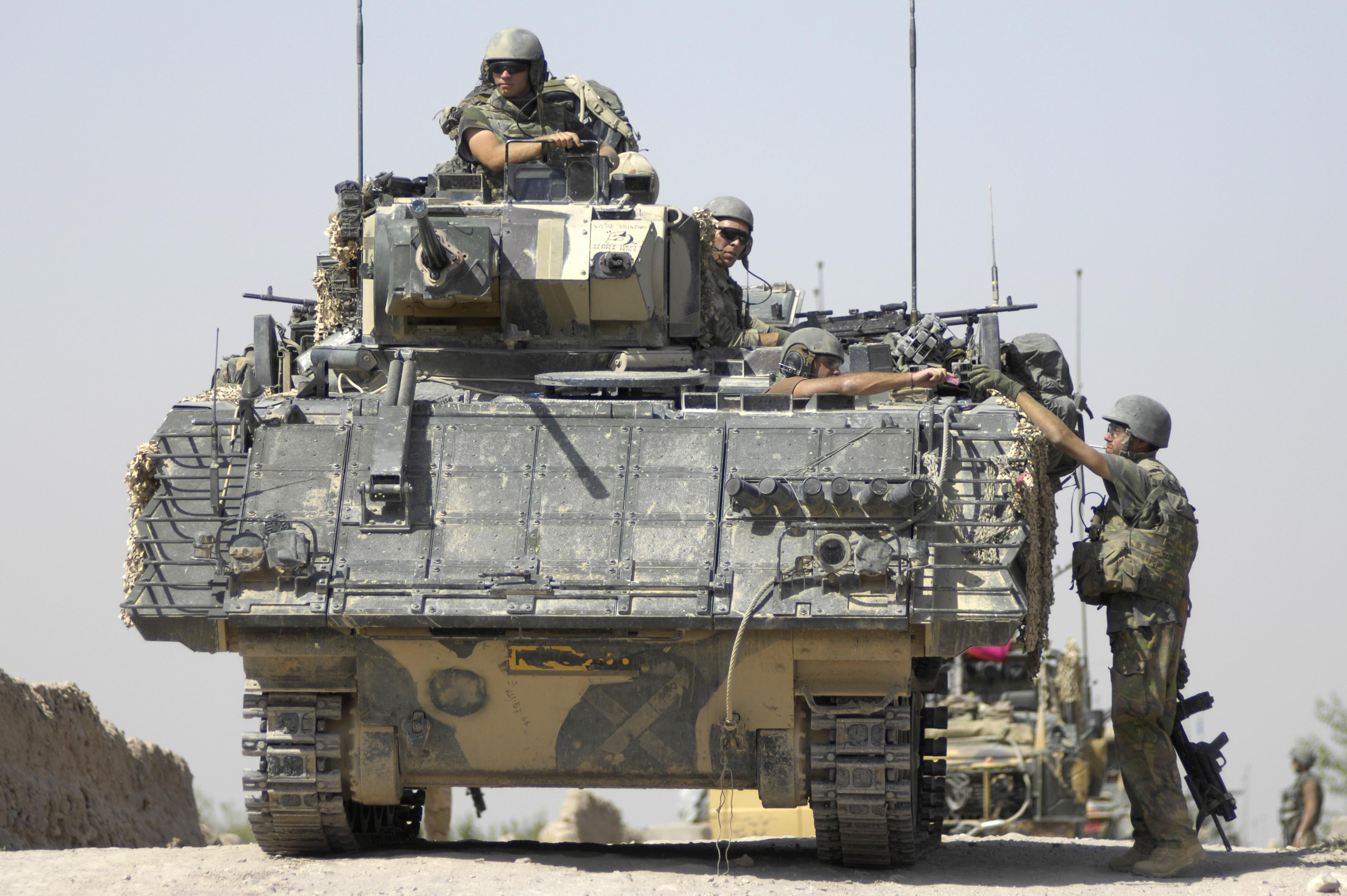
Dutch AIFV, Model YPR-765, with Oerlikon KBA 25 mm gun.

A development of the M113A1 APC, upgraded with an enclosed turret and firing ports.

Others
In 1994, a stretched version of the M113 was presented by its manufacturer, also known as Mobile Tactical Vehicle Light (MTVL). Its hull is lengthened by 34 inches and equipped with an additional road wheel (six on each side) to sustain the added dry weight and payload. The vehicle was developed as a "production-tooled demonstrator" with private-industry funding from United Defense. United Defense LP proposed the MTVL for the Interim Armored Vehicle program in 2000. Although the U.S. Army did not buy it, it was acquired by other nations, and is copied today by Pakistan, Turkey and Egypt in their local plants. Some nations, like Canada and Australia, also stretched existing M113 hulls.

The Army plans to convert four M113s into unmanned ground vehicles (UGVs) by late 2019 to serve in experimentation roles to test unmanned movement and combat concepts prior to the fielding of purpose-built robotic combat vehicles, planned by 2028.

M113 copies
Several countries acquired M113s and later copied the design and proceeded to produce clones or evolved models (post-M113A3-standard) in their own indigenous factories. Pakistan produces an armored personnel carrier known as Talha which has a number of mechanical and automotive parts in common with the M113. Turkey produces the ACV-300 based on the AIFV. Egypt produces many variants of the M113 including the Egyptian Infantry Fighting Vehicle (EIFV), which features a combination of an M113A3-base and the fully functional and stabilized two-man turret of the M2 Bradley. Iran is also producing its own M113s.

== Operators ==
=== Current operators ===
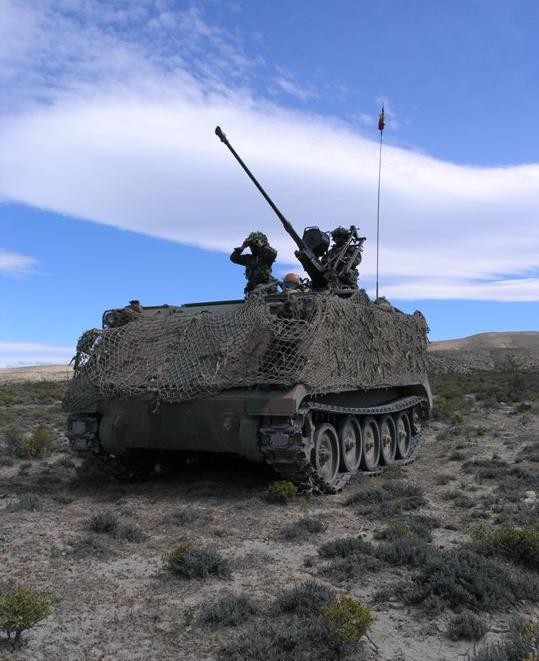
Argentine Army M113 with 20 mm gun, 2015.

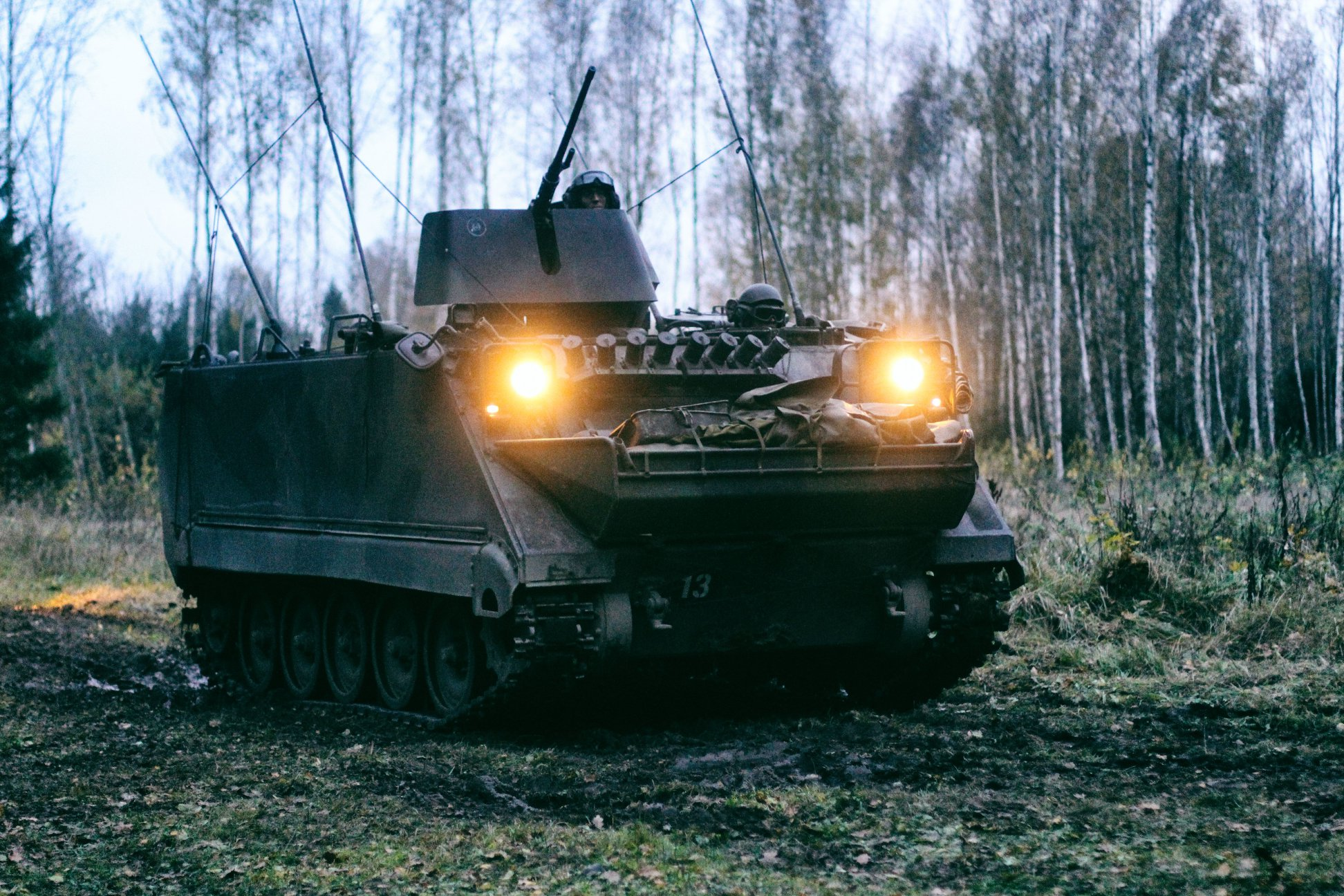
Lithuanian Armed Forces M113A2 with 50 cal. machine gun.

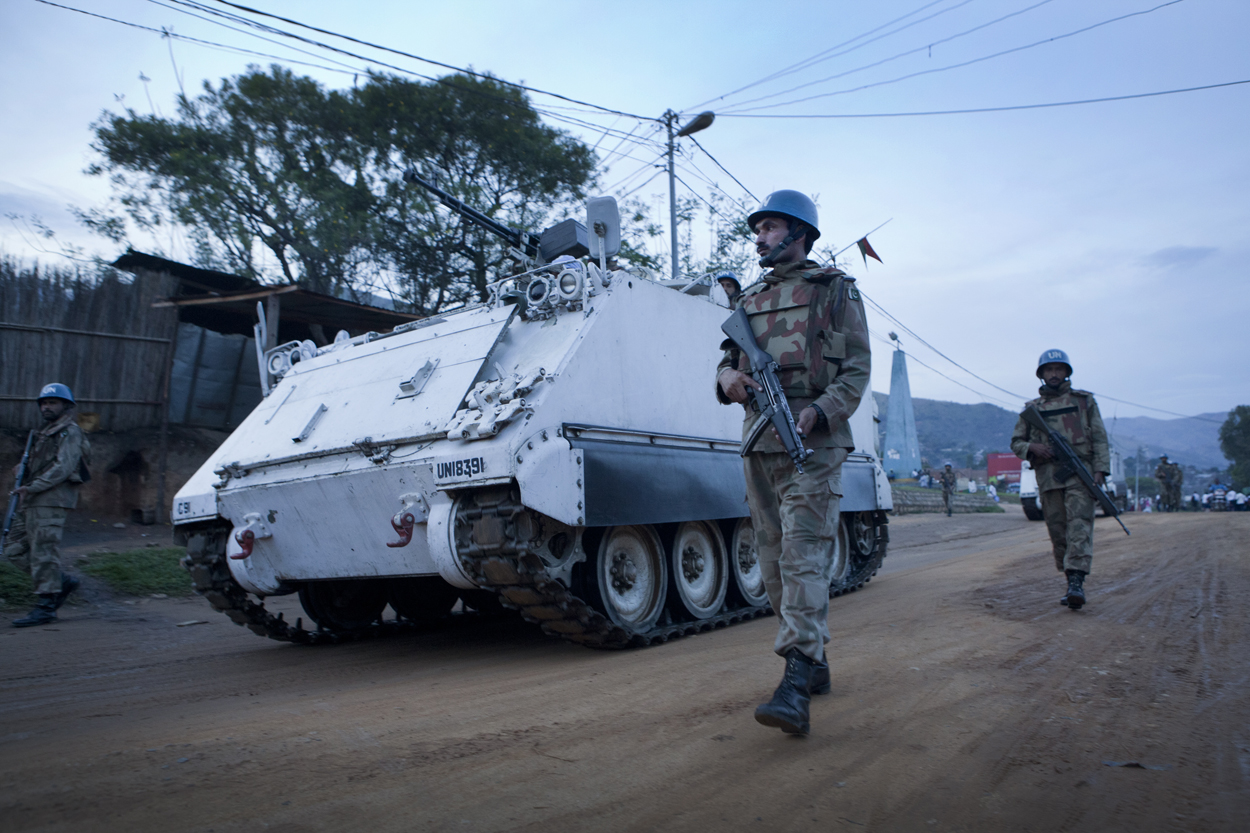
Pakistani Peacekeeper M113 patrolling in DRC.

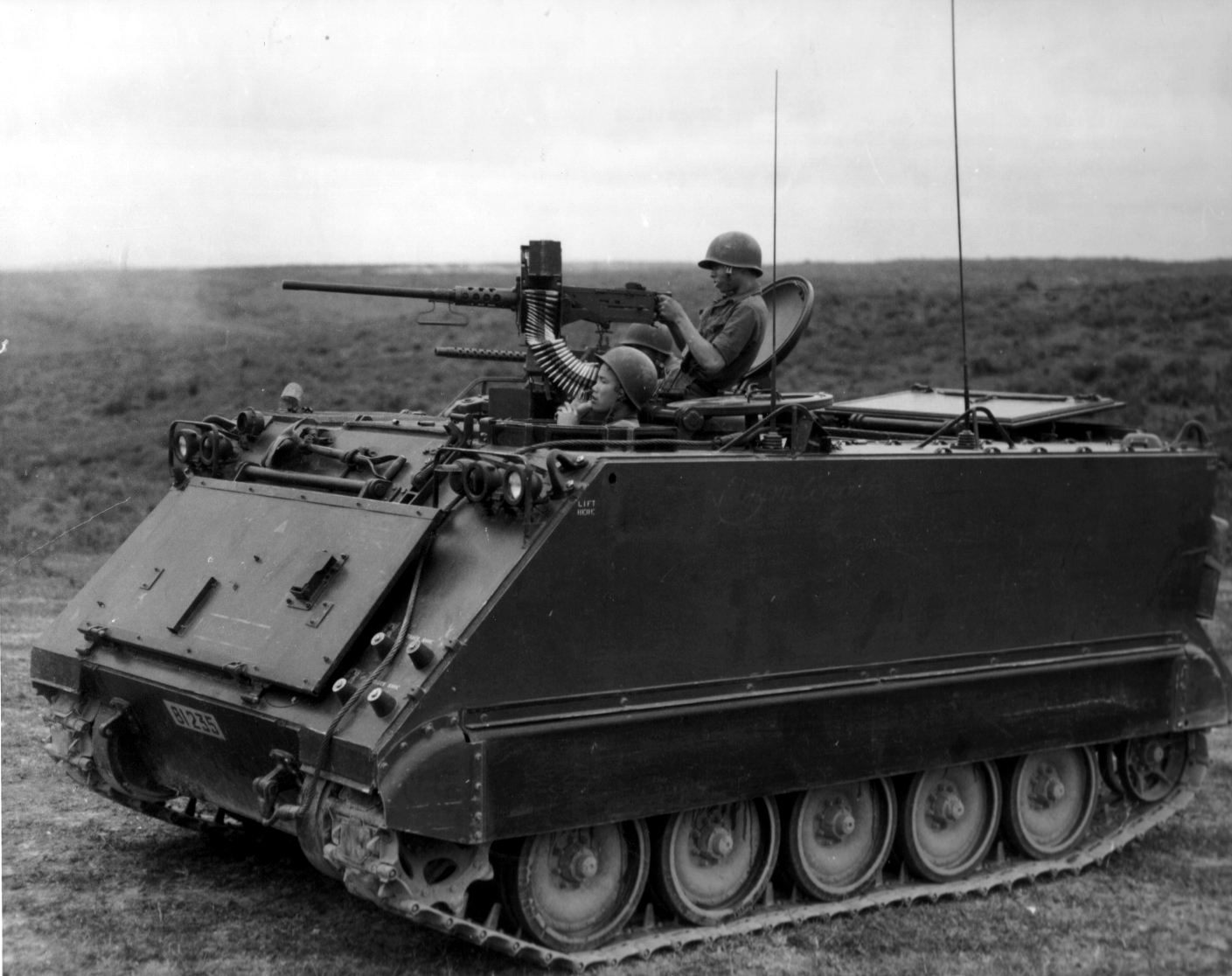
An ARVN M113 without ACAV set during the Vietnam War.

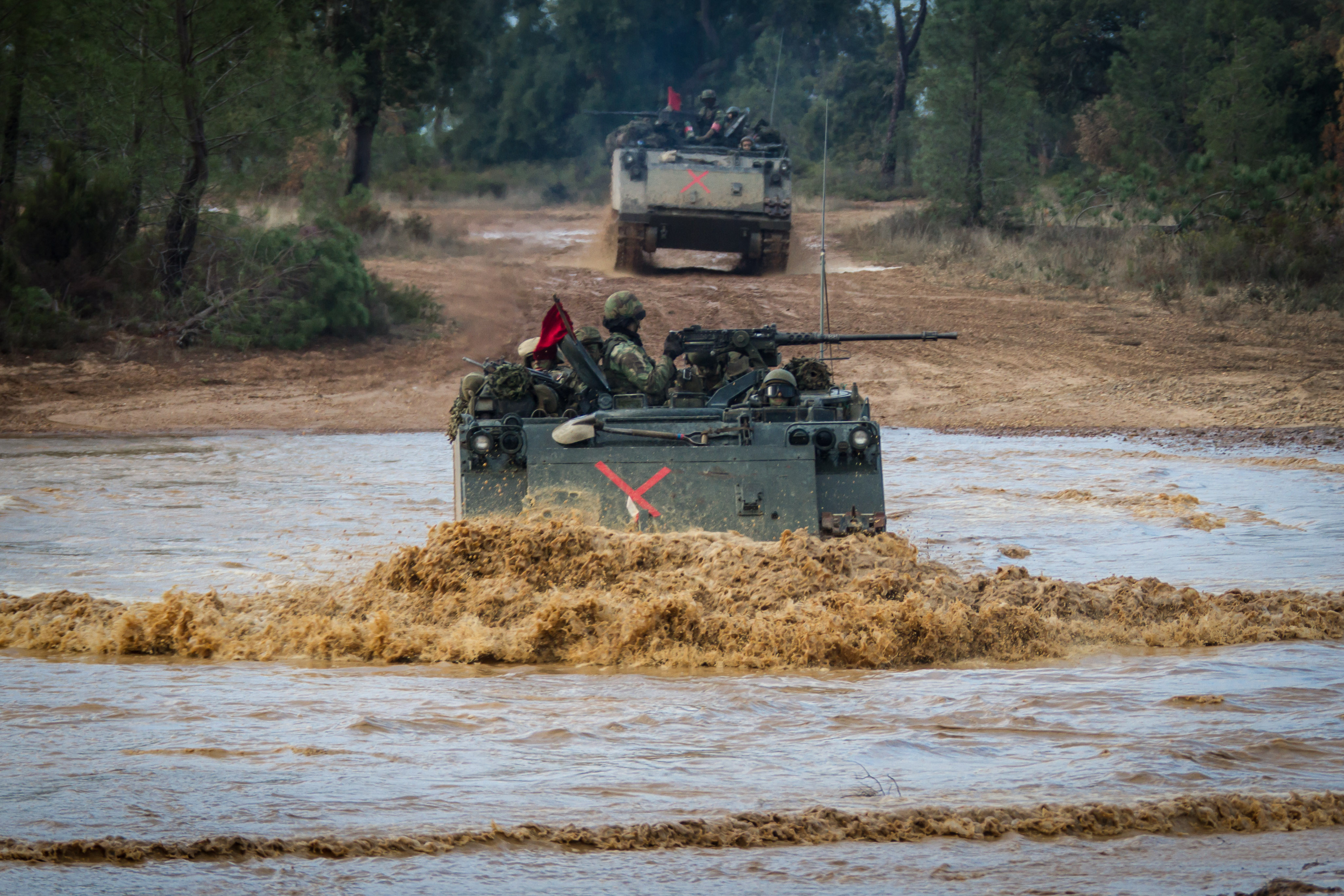
Portuguese Mechanized Infantry M113 cross a watercourse.

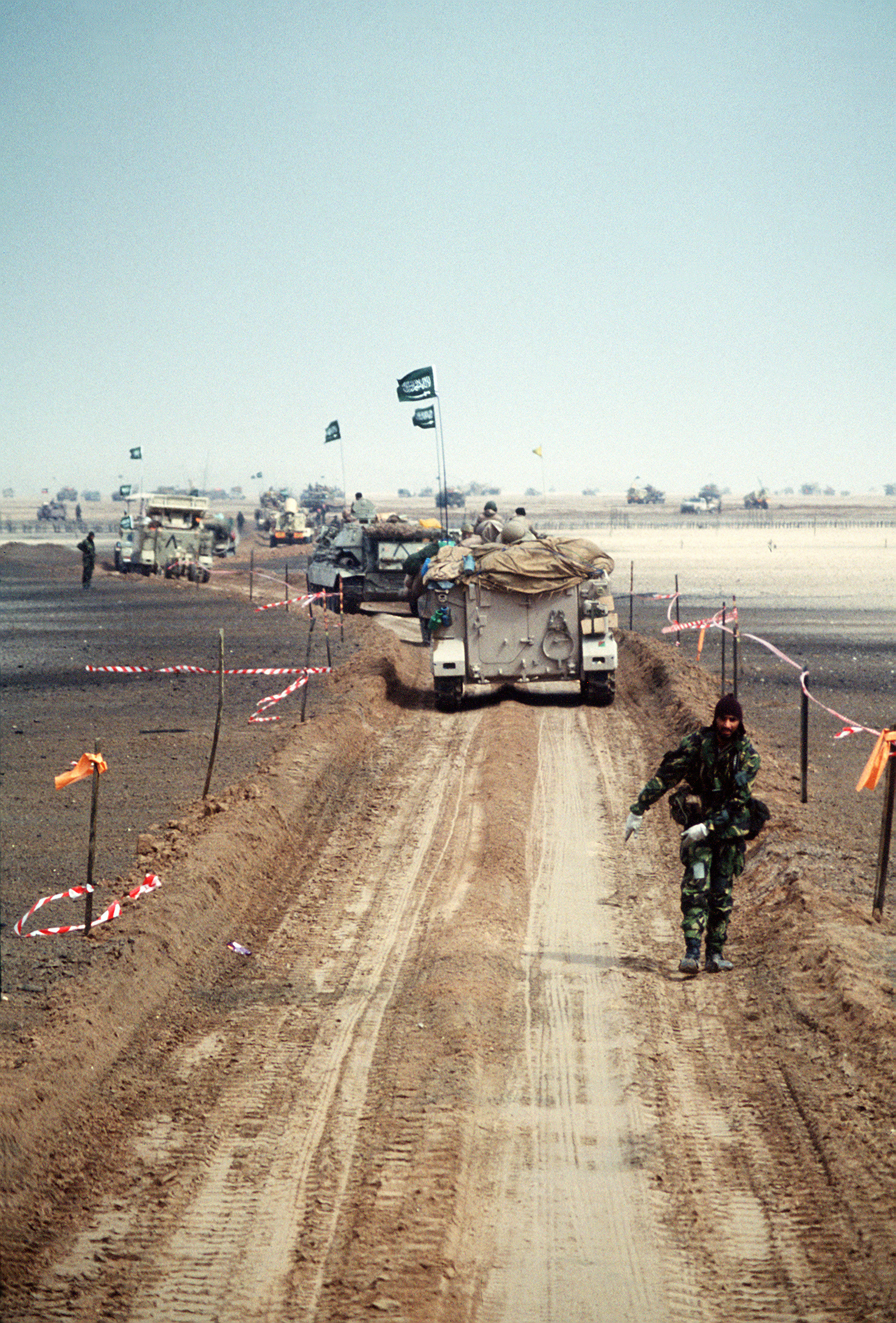
A column of M113 armored personnel carriers and other military vehicles of the Royal Saudi Land Force along a channel cleared of mines during the Gulf War's Operation Desert Storm.

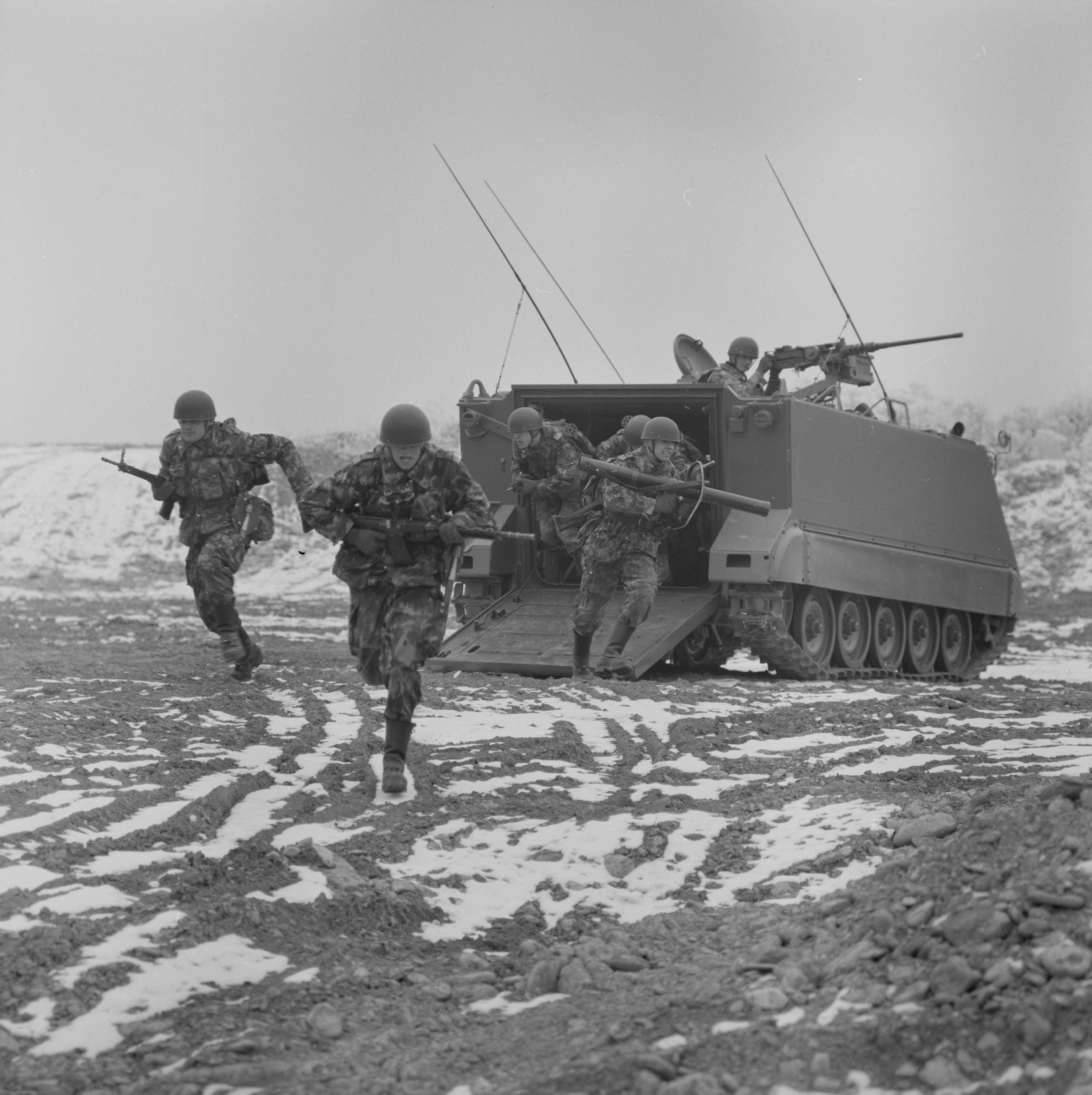
Swiss Schützenpanzer 63 (M113A1) in 1964.

- Afghanistan: 173 M113A2, as of 2020
- Argentina: (Argentine Army) 114 M113A2 (20 mm cannon), 70 M113A1-ACAV, 204 M113A2
- Australia (Australian Army): 340 M113AS4 and 91 M113AS3 upgraded in service from 840 M113A1.
- Bahrain: 300 M113A2, 12 M113A2 (120 mm gun)
- Benin (Benin Army): 22
- Bolivia: (Bolivian Army): 50+
- Bosnia and Herzegovina: 20 M113A2
- Brazil: Brazilian Army: 198 M113A1; 386 M113BR; 12 M113A2; 64 M577A2; Brazilian Marine Corps: 30 Received deliveries of both new and second-hand M113 and M113A2. M113 upgraded locally with Scania diesel engines.
- Cambodia (Royal Cambodian Army)
- Canada: (Canadian Army) 140 M113A3/M577A3 (CP)
- Chile (Chilean Army): 306 M113A1 and M1113A2 Received deliveries of both new and second-hand M113A1 and M113A2.
- Colombia: 28 M113A1, 26 M113A2.
- Cyprus: 418
- Denmark: 65 M113G4 DK variants and 170 M113G3 DK variants
- Ecuador: 20
- Egypt: 2,498 M113A2 and M-106A2, 60 M-125, 33 M-981 FISTV, and 131 M577A1 (CP).
- Germany: 37
- Greece: 1,852 M113A1 and M113A2, 187 M577 (CP). mostly second-hand
- Guatemala 10 M113
- Iran (Iranian Army): 200
- Iraq (Iraqi Army): Iraq bought 1,026 second-hand M113A2s in June 2013. Also captured a small number of M113s during Iran–Iraq War.
- Indonesia: 143 M113A1-B, 1 M113A1-B-GN, 5 M113 Arisgator (combat engineer version).
- Israel (Israeli Defence Forces): 500 M113A2.
- Jordan: 370 M113A1 and M113A2, 269 M577A2 (CP).
- Kataib Hezbollah: Unknown number
- Kuwait: 230 M113A2, 30 M577 (CP)
- Lebanon (Lebanese Army): 1,274 M113A1 and M113A2
  - Hezbollah: Unknown number captured from the South Lebanon Army currently employed in the Syrian Civil War.
- Libya (Libyan National Army) M113, M106
- Lithuania (Lithuanian Land Force): 234 M113A1, 22 M577 (CP), 15 M113 with Tampella mortar
- Morocco: 400 M113A1 and M113A2, 419 M113A3, 86 M577A2 (CP), 80 M901, 60 M163, 36 M106A2, 91 M1064A3.
- North Macedonia: 27
- Norway (Norwegian Army): 315, including at least 97 M113E3s Upgrading some to a new variant, the M113F4, was proposed, but it was ultimately set aside in favor of FFG's ACSV, which is based on the PMMC G5.
- Pakistan: (Pakistan Army) 2,300 M113A1/A2/P; M113 with RBS-70.
- Peru: 120 M113A1. Upgrades are done by Desarrollos Industriales Casanave, known as Cobra-1. This involves changing the old engine for a Detroit Diesel 6V53T turbocharged two-stroke 280 HP and with improved gearbox, optimization in the system of suspension and steering, improvement in the electrical system with a 200 amp generator. It also adds a RCWS system, consisting of a ZTM-1 30 x 165 mm automatic cannon with a range of 4,000 m, two RAYO R-2P missile launchers with a range of 5,000 m against low-altitude ground and aerial targets, a coaxial machine gun 7.62 x 54 mm caliber, and smoke launchers.
- Philippines (Philippine Army): 34 M113A1 FSV (fire support vehicles), 18 M113A2 FSV, 42 M113A1, 120 M113A2 (some with Dragon RWS).
- Poland (Polish Land Forces): 70 M-577 (CP) and medical evacuation version.
- Portugal (Portuguese Army): 176 M113A1, 14 M113A2, 49 M577A2 (CP), 17 M113 with TOW.
- Russia (Russian Land Forces): About 33 or more M113s of different variants were captured from Ukrainian forces (Including 2 Netherlands donated units, 4 US donated units and 1 Australia donated unit). Russian forces have also been seen using captured M113 armored personnel carriers in combat.
- Saudi Arabia (Saudi Arabian Army): 1,190 M113A4.
- Singapore (Singapore Armed Forces): 750+ M113A1 and M113A2
- South Korea (South Korean army): 420 M113, 140 M577 (CP)
- Spain: 453
- Sudan: 36
- Switzerland: 311 M113A2
- Syria: Donated to the Syrian National Army by Turkey in 2018 and 2020 before merging with the Syrian Army in January 2025, after the fall of Ba'athist Syria.
- Taiwan (Republic of China Army): (CM-21 variant) 650 M113, 225 with 20–30 mm cannon
- Thailand: 430 M113A1 and M113A3.
- Tunisia: 140 M113A1 and M113A2.
- Turkey: 2,813 M113A2T1 & T2
- Ukraine: Following the 2022 Russian invasion of Ukraine, 900 donated by the United States, 47 donated by Portugal (including 2 M577A2), 20 donated by Spain, 11 donated by Germany, 42 M113AS4 donated by Australia and transported by An-124 Antonov Airlines from Canberra to Leipzig. ~353 YPR-765 were donated by the Netherlands. A further 54 M113G3DK have been donated by Denmark. 70 later donated by Lithuania. Another 100 to be delivered by the United States, and an unspecified amount refurbished units to be donated by the Netherlands, Belgium and Luxembourg. As of 1 February 2025, 499 M113s of different variants were either destroyed, damaged, abandoned or captured by Russian forces during the conflict (470 US-donated units, 11 Denmark-donated units and 18 Australia-donated units)
- United States:
  - US Army Estimated 4,200 M113A2/A3 (8,000 more in storage) as of January 2025.
- Uruguay: 24 M113A1UR
- Vietnam: 200
- Yemen: 107 M113A1

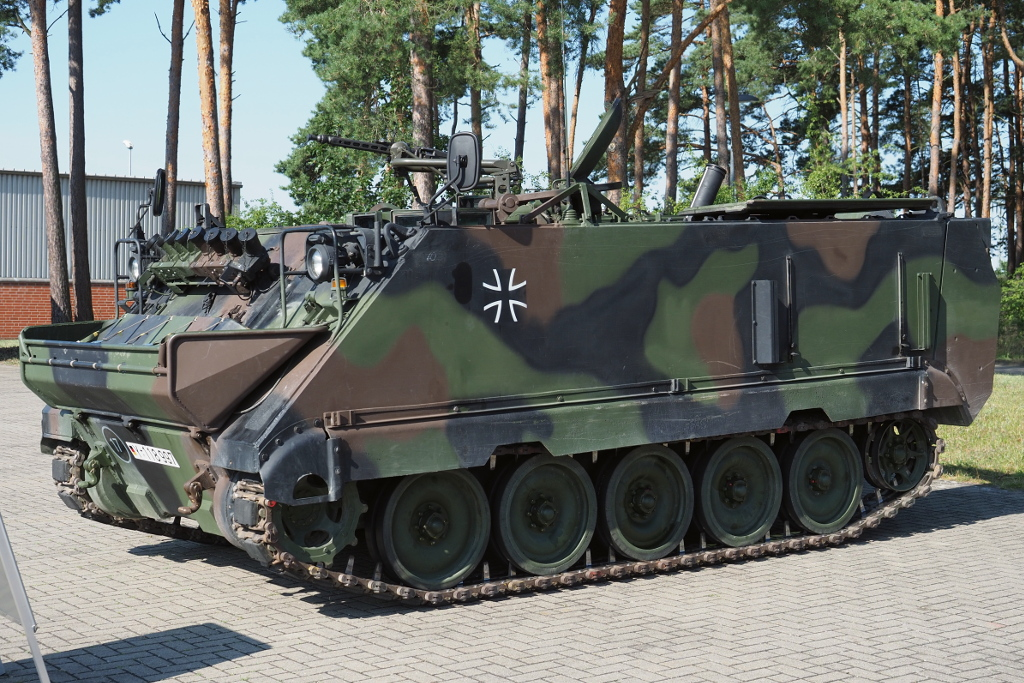
A Bundeswehr M113 120 mm mortar carrier.

=== Former operators ===
- Arab Socialist Union (Lebanon): some captured from the Lebanese Army and the Kataeb Regulatory Forces
- Amal Movement: some captured from the Lebanese Army and the South Lebanon Army
- Al-Mourabitoun: some captured from the Lebanese Army
- Army of Free Lebanon: seized from Lebanese Army stocks
- Costa Rica
- Ethiopia: 90 M113A1
- Guardians of the Cedars: some captured from the Lebanese Army
- Italy: last 10 vehicles decommissioned in 2021.
- Kataeb Regulatory Forces: some captured from the Lebanese Army
- Kingdom of Laos: 20 M113, probably second-hand, formerly in service with the Royal Lao Army (RLA)
- Lebanese Arab Army: seized from Lebanese Army stocks
- Lebanese Forces: captured from the Lebanese Army or delivered as aid by Israel and Iraq
- New Zealand: Peak 78 vehicles. Retired in 2005.
- North Vietnam: ~ 200 captured from the Americans and the South Vietnamese.
- Imperial State of Iran: delivered to the Shah by the Americans.
- Palestine (Palestine Liberation Organization factions in Lebanon): some captured from the Lebanese Army in 1976 and returned in 1991.
- Progressive Socialist Party/ People's Liberation Army (PLA): 43 captured from the Lebanese Army and the Lebanese Forces between 1976 and 1984.
- Syrian Social Nationalist Party in Lebanon (SSNP-L)/Eagles of the Whirlwind: some captured from the Lebanese Army
- South Lebanon Army: captured from the Lebanese Army or delivered as aid by Israel
- South Vietnam: used by the Army of the Republic of Vietnam
- Tigers Militia: some captured from the Lebanese Army.
- Zaire: 12.
- Zgharta Liberation Army (a.k.a. Marada Brigade): some captured from the Lebanese Army

=== Former civilian operators ===
- Alliance Police Department 1 M113 used by department. Most likely eliminated in 2015 due to executive order 13688
- Calhoun County Sheriffs Department: 1 M113 and 1 M577 used by department. Was eliminated in 2015 due to executive order 13688
- United States (NASA): 4 M113s were in service as emergency crew evacuation vehicles at the Kennedy Space Center during the Shuttle program. They were replaced by MRAPs for Crew Dragon launches.

== See also ==
- Boxer MRAV – Germany's replacement for the M113
- BVP M-80 – tracked ex-Yugoslavian-made APC and IFV
- FV432 – a contemporary British APC
- List of U.S. military vehicles by model number
- M114 armored fighting vehicle – a similar but smaller reconnaissance vehicle
- MLVM – a contemporary Romanian APC
- MT-LB – a contemporary Soviet APC
- Pansarbandvagn 302 – Swedish APC
- Type 60 – a contemporary Japanese APC
- Type 63/Type 85/Type 89 – a contemporary Chinese APC
- AMX-10P – a contemporary French APC
