= Chris Geoghegan =

- Born: Christopher Vincent Geoghegan; 13 June 1954 (age 72)
- Education: Bishop Henshaw Senior High School; Manchester Polytechnic
- Occupation: Businessman

Christopher Vincent Geoghegan (born 13 June 1954) is a former board member of BAE Systems (2002–07) and president of the Society of British Aircraft Constructors.

He was educated at Bishop Henshaw Senior High School in Rochdale, Lancashire and gained a degree in Business Studies from Manchester Polytechnic.

Geoghegan joined a predecessor of BAE in 1973. In 1998 he was seconded to Airbus Industrie, 20% owned by British Aerospace. In April 2000 he returned to BAE Systems to head BAE Systems Avionics.

Following the shock resignation of BAE CEO John Weston in early 2002, Geoghegan was promoted to joint chief operating officer. He replaced Mike Turner who was promoted to CEO to replace Weston.

With effect from January 2007 Geoghegan and his co-COO were replaced by Ian King. King was promoted in what the Financial Times described as "in part designed to improve relations with the MoD further". Geoghean maintains his responsibility for BAE's partnerships, including MBDA, and remains on the board and reports to King.
