= Defence Industrial Strategy (2005) =

United Kingdom government policy

The Defence Industrial Strategy (DIS) was a United Kingdom government policy statement which was published as a white paper on 15 December 2005. The purpose of the DIS was stated as ensuring that the UK Armed Forces were provided with the equipment they required, on time, and at best value for money. This was to achieved through the maintenance of sovereign capabilities, i.e. the capabilities of UK companies in key defence areas.

The strategy was structured into three parts: Part A outlined the strategy, Part B reviewed the capabilities of the UK defence industry, and Part C dealt with the implications of the DIS and how it was to be implemented.

== Contents ==
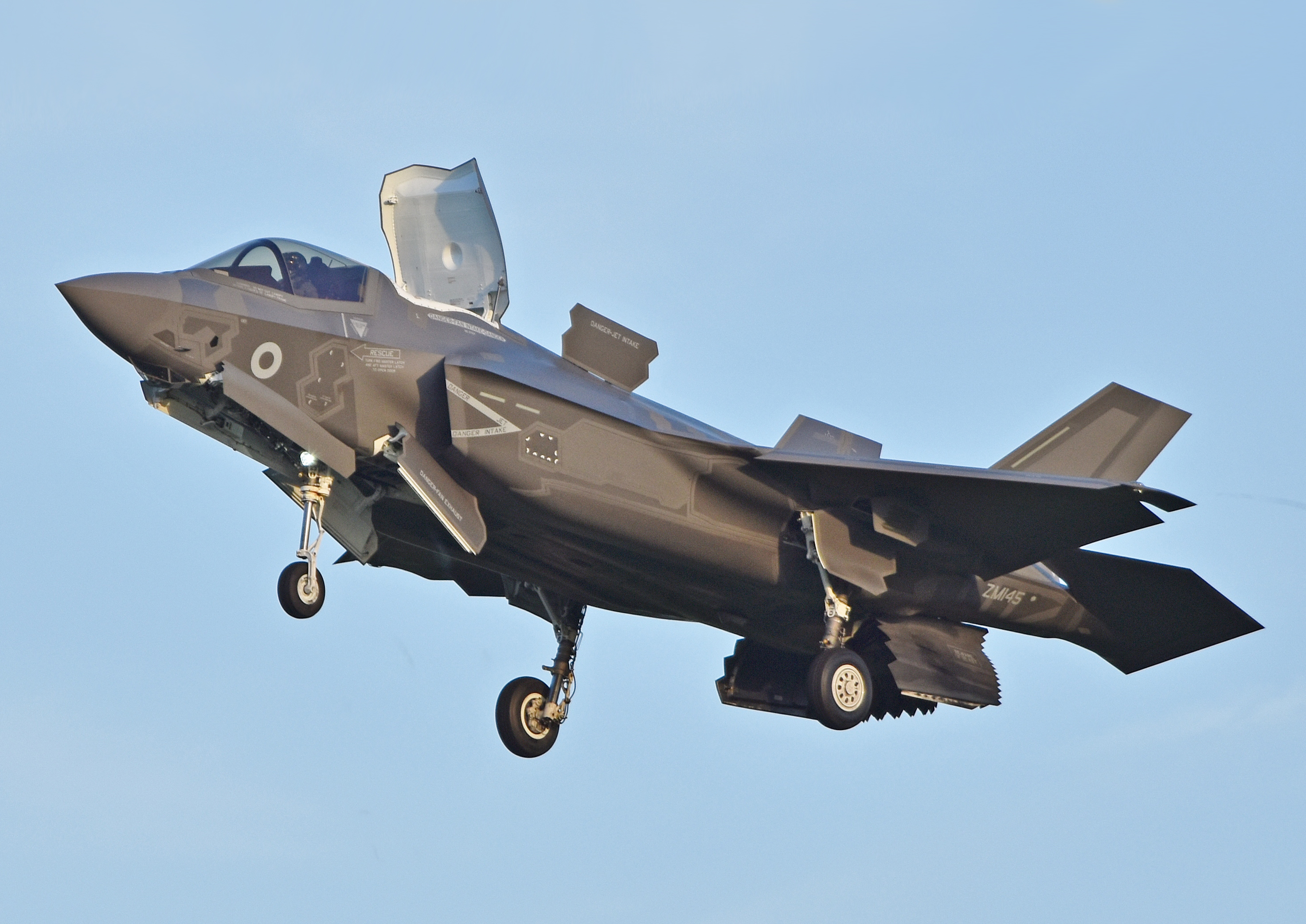
The Joint Combat Aircraft (F-35B), which featured in the strategy

The DIS built upon the Defence Industrial Policy published in 2002 and the Strategic Defence Review of 1998. UK defence procurement was radically changed by the government of Margaret Thatcher - cost-plus contracts and "national champions" were abandoned in favour of competitive tendering. This made the UK defence procurement market the most open in the world, in contrast with the European continent and America. The DIS reverted to the concept of "national champions" to maintain vital capabilities, as identified by the Ministry of Defence "to maintain appropriate sovereignty and thereby protect UK national security". The Defence Industries Council warned in 2004 that the continuation of a totally "open market" approach would see the UK "lose almost completely the strong industrial base that has supplied our armed forces. UK sovereignty could be threatened".

The DIS was widely seen as confirming BAE Systems as the UK's "national champion". Of the key industrial capabilities which must be maintained several were dominated by BAE, including naval vessels and submarines, armoured fighting vehicles (over 95% of the UK’s AFVs are BAE products), fixed-wing aircraft, general munitions (with the exception of certain "niche capabilities abroad") and Network Enabled Capability (defined as C4ISTAR in the DIS). After the publication of the DIS, BAE Systems' CEO Mike Turner said "If we didn't have the DIS and our profitability and the terms of trade had stayed as they were ... then there had to be a question mark about our future in the U.K."

In the year after the release of the DIS the government released the Defence Technology Strategy, which took forward some of the themes introduced in the DIS. This document discussed where science and technology research should focus on to deliver the capabilities identified in the DIS.

An updated version of the DTS was expected to be published by the Defence Technology Innovation Centre (DTIC) in 2008.

== Follow-on strategies ==
After the following coalition government came to power, it initiated the Strategic Defence and Security Review 2010 and later published a white paper titled "National security through technology" in 2012. The following government initiated the Strategic Defence and Security Review 2015 then held a consultation on a "Defence industrial policy" in 2016.

As of September 2025 the latest governmental strategy document covering defence industry capabilities is the Defence Industrial Strategy of 2025.
