= Roger Carr (businessman) =

British businessman

Sir Roger Carr
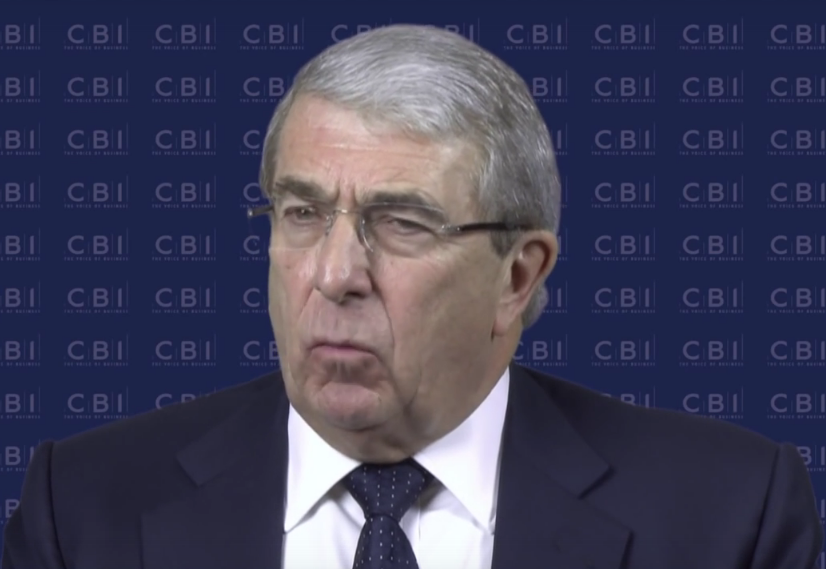
- Born: Roger Martyn Carr; 22 December 1946 (age 79); Nottingham, Nottinghamshire, UK
- Occupation: Businessman
- Years active: 1967–present
- Title: Chairman, BAE Systems
- Term: 2014–2023
- Predecessor: Dick Olver
- Successor: Cressida Hogg

Sir Roger Martyn Carr (born 22 December 1946) is a British businessman. He was chairman of BAE Systems until May 2023.

== Early life and education ==
Carr was born and grew up in Nottingham, the son of a car dealer father and ballet teacher mother. After leaving Nottingham High School, he worked for Boots as a computer programmer and studied at Trent Polytechnic where he graduated with a BA in Business Studies. He subsequently moved to Honeywell, working on the installation of mainframes in some of Britain's biggest companies.

== Career ==
He has been on the board of eight companies, including BAE Systems, Centrica plc, Mitchells & Butlers, Cadbury plc, Chubb Locks, Thames Water and Williams Holdings.

Carr's first period on a company board began in 1994, when he became CEO of Williams Holdings. In 2000, Williams Holdings demerged into Chubb and Kidde, and Carr became the chairman of Chubb.

In 1998, Carr became chairman of Thames Water, stepping down in 2000.

In 2003, he became chairman of Mitchells & Butlers, a British company that owned over 2,000 pubs and restaurants. He stepped down as chairman in 2008. He became chairman of Centrica in 2004.

Carr was a senior advisor to Kohlberg Kravis Roberts, the American private equity firm, but stepped back in 2008 when KKR considered a takeover bid for Mitchells & Butlers. In 2008, Carr became the chairman of Cadbury plc, the United Kingdom's largest confectionery manufacturer. He resigned on 3 February 2010 when the company was bought by Kraft Foods.

Carr was knighted in the 2011 New Year Honours for services to business. He was President of the Confederation of British Industry from June 2011. Carr was succeeded in the role by Sir Michael Rake in June 2013.

In June 2013, BAE Systems announced that Carr was to join the board as a non-executive director and chairman designate on 1 October 2013, and that he would succeed Dick Olver as chairman in the first quarter of 2014. He was to relinquish his role as chairman of BAE Systems in May 2023.

In March 2015, it was announced that Carr had been appointed as the vice-chairman of the BBC Trust and would serve on the BBC's governing body for four years.

Carr is the chairman of the English National Ballet. In addition, he is a Vice President of the Royal Navy and Royal Marines Charity, a Trustee of Bletchley Park and a Visiting Fellow of Saïd Business School, University of Oxford.

== Personal life ==
Carr is married with one daughter. He owns two homes, one in Kensington, West London and one in the Cotswolds. As of February 2023, his annual earnings, through his combined roles, exceeded £1 million.
