= Al-Yamamah arms deal =

Name of a series of record arms sales by the United Kingdom to Saudi Arabia

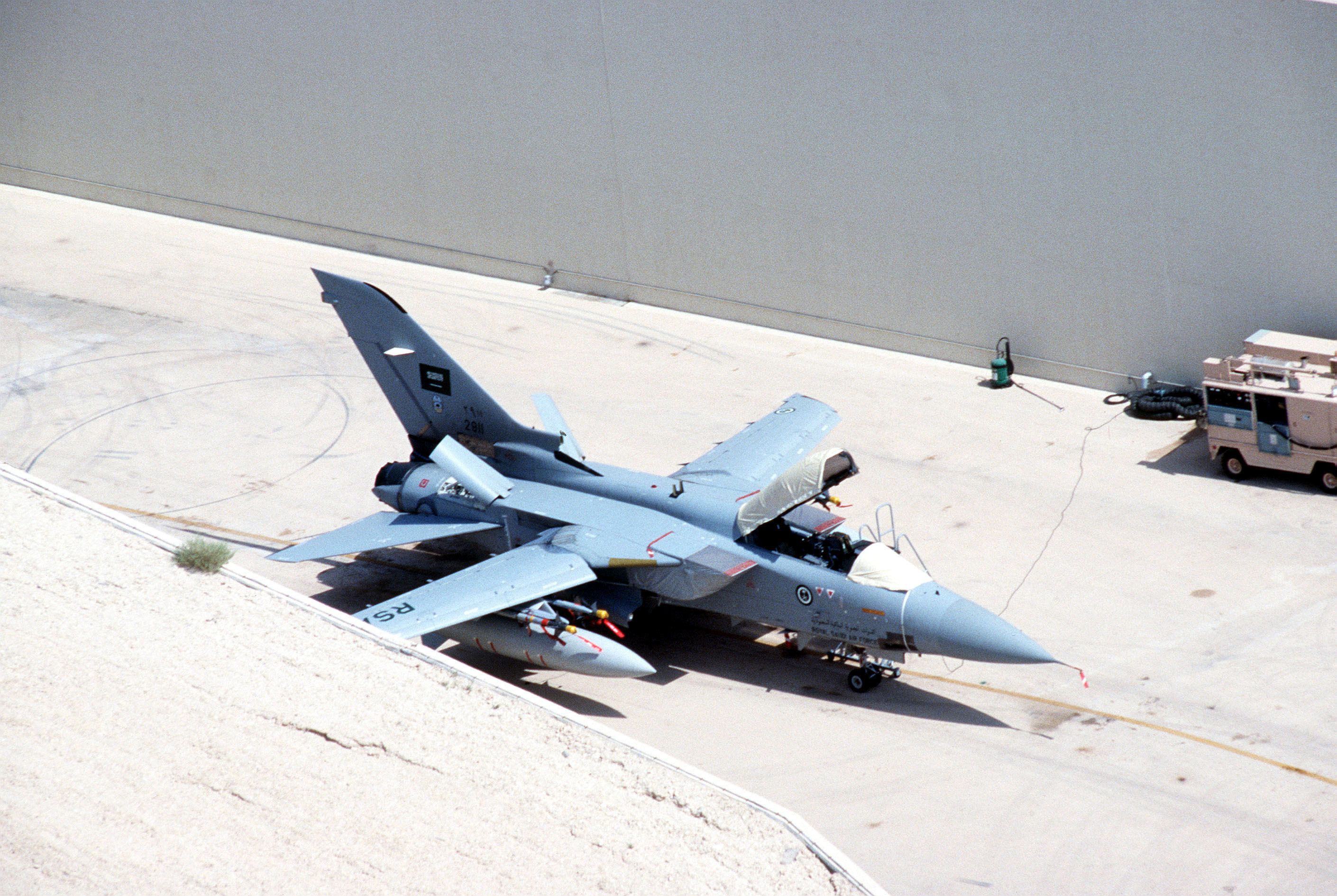
A central part of the Al Yamamah deal was the sale of Tornado fighters to the Royal Saudi Air Force.

Al Yamamah (Arabic: اليمامة, lit. 'The Dove') is the name of a series of record arms sales by the United Kingdom to Saudi Arabia, paid for by the delivery of up to 600,000 barrels (95,000 m^{3}) of crude oil per day to the British government. The prime contractor has been BAE Systems and its predecessor British Aerospace. The first sales occurred in September 1985 and the most recent contract for 72 Eurofighter Typhoon multirole fighters was signed in August 2006.

Mike Turner, then CEO of BAE Systems, said in August 2005 that BAE and its predecessor had earned £43 billion in twenty years from the contracts and that it could earn £40 billion more. It is Britain's largest ever export agreement, and employs at least 5,000 people in Saudi Arabia.

In 2010, BAE Systems pleaded guilty in a United States court to charges of false accounting and making misleading statements in connection with the sales. An investigation by the British Serious Fraud Office into the deal was discontinued after political pressure from the Saudi and British governments.

== Background ==
The UK was already a major supplier of arms to Saudi Arabia prior to Al Yamamah. In 1964 the British Aircraft Corporation conducted demonstration flights of their Lightning aircraft in Riyadh and in 1965 Saudi Arabia signed a letter of intent for the supply of Lightning and Strikemaster aircraft as well as Thunderbird surface to air missiles. The main contract was signed in 1966 for 40 Lightnings and 25 Strikemasters (eventually raised to 40). In 1973 the Saudi government signed an agreement with the British government which specified BAC as the contractor for all parts of the defence system (AEI was previously contracted to supply the radar equipment and Airwork Services provided servicing and training). Overall spending by the Royal Saudi Air Force (RSAF) was over £10 billion (SAR 57 billion).

In the 1970s, United States defence contractors won major contracts, including 114 Northrop F-5s. In 1981 the RSAF ordered 46 F-15Cs and 16 F-15Ds, followed in 1982 by the purchase of 5 E-3A AWACS aircraft. Following these deals and partly due to pro-Israeli sentiment in the US Congress, which would have either blocked a deal or insisted on usage restrictions for exported aircraft, Saudi Arabia turned to the UK for further arms purchases.

== Summary ==
The Financial Times reported Saudi Arabian "interest" in the Panavia Tornado in July 1984. Export had become a possibility after West Germany lifted its objections to exports outside of NATO. In September 1985 Saudi Arabia agreed "in principle" to a Tornado, Hawk and missile deal. On 26 September 1985 the defence ministers of the UK and Saudi Arabia sign a Memorandum of Understanding in London for 48 Tornado IDSs, 24 Tornado ADVs, 30 Hawk training aircraft, 30 Pilatus PC-9 trainers, a range of weapons, radar, spares and a pilot-training programme. The second stage (Al Yamamah II) was signed on 3 July 1988 in Bermuda by the defence ministers of the UK and Saudi Arabia.

Although the full extent of the deal has never been fully clarified, it has been described as "the biggest [British] sale ever of anything to anyone", "staggering both by its sheer size and complexity". At a minimum, it is believed to involve the supply and support of 96 Panavia Tornado ground attack aircraft, 24 Air Defence Variants (ADVs), 50 BAE Hawk and 50 Pilatus PC-9 aircraft, specialised naval vessels, and various infrastructure works. The initial Memorandum of Understanding committed the UK to purchasing the obsolete Lightning and Strikemaster aircraft, along with associated equipment and spare parts.

The British government's prime contractor for the project is BAE Systems. BAE has approximately 4,000 employees working directly with the Royal Saudi Air Force (also see Military of Saudi Arabia).

The success of the initial contract has been attributed to Prime Minister Margaret Thatcher, who lobbied hard on behalf of British industry. A Ministry of Defence briefing paper for Thatcher detailed her involvement in the negotiations:

Since early 1984, intensive efforts have been made to sell Tornado and Hawk to the Saudis. When, in the Autumn of 1984, they seemed to be leaning towards French Mirage fighters, Mr Heseltine paid an urgent visit to Saudi Arabia, carrying a letter from the Prime Minister to King Fahd. In December 1984 the Prime Minister started a series of important negotiations by meeting Prince Bandar, the son of Prince Sultan. The Prime Minister met the King in Riyadh in April this year and in August the King wrote to her stating his decision to buy 48 Tornado IDS and 30 Hawk.

There were no conditions relating to security sector reform or human rights included in the contracts. Contracts between BAE Systems and the Saudi government have been underwritten by the Export Credits Guarantee Department, a tax-payer funded insurance system. Guarantees on a contract worth up to £2.7 billion were signed by the Government on 1 September 2003. In December 2004, the Commons Trade Committee chairman, Martin O'Neill, accused the Government of being foolish for concealing a £1 billion guarantee they have given to BAE Systems.

=== Al Yamamah I ===
- 48 Panavia Tornado IDS (interdictor/strike aircraft)
  - 28 GR1 standard
  - 6 GR1A reconnaissance standard
  - 14 dual control trainers
- 24 Panavia Tornado ADVs, equivalent to RAF's Tornado F3 standard
- JP233 runway denial munition
- Sea Eagle anti-ship missile
- ALARM anti-radar missile
- Skyflash air-to-air missile

The first aircraft (two Hawks) were delivered on 11 August 1987 at BAE's Dunsfold facility.

=== Al Yamamah II ===
Deliveries early 1990s – 1998

- 48 Panavia Tornado IDS

=== Eurofighter Typhoon (al-Salam) ===
In December 2005 the governments of the UK and Saudi Arabia signed an "Understanding Document" which involved the sale of Typhoon aircraft to replace RSAF Tornados and other aircraft. Although no details were released, reports suggested the deal involved the supply of 72 aircraft. On 18 August 2006 a contract was signed for 72 aircraft. The aircraft cost approximately £4.43 billion, and the full weapons system is expected to cost approximately £10 billion.

=== Tornado upgrade ===
In February 2006 Air Forces Monthly suggested that the eventual Eurofighter order may reach 100 and the deal could include the upgrade of the RSAF's Tornado IDS aircraft, likely similar to the RAF's Tornado GR4 standard. In an editorial the magazine also raises the prospect of a requirement for a new lead-in fighter trainer to replace the earlier generation of Hawk 65/65As and to provide adequate training for transition of pilots to the advanced Typhoon. BAE System's 2005 Interim Report noted that three RSAF Tornado IDS' arrived at their Warton facility for design evaluation tests with the ultimate aim being "to improve serviceability, address obsolescence, and enhance and sustain the capability of the aircraft". On 10 September 2006 BAE won a £2.5 bn (€3.7 bn, $4.6 bn) contract for the upgrade of 80 RSAF Tornado IDS aircraft.

== Corruption allegations ==
There have been numerous allegations that the Al Yamamah contracts were a result of bribes to members of the Saudi royal family and government officials.

Some allegations suggested that the former prime minister's son Mark Thatcher may have been involved; however, he has strongly denied receiving payments or exploiting his mother's connections in his business dealings.

In February 2001, the solicitor of a former BAE Systems employee, Edward Cunningham, notified Serious Fraud Office of the evidence that his client was holding which related to an alleged "slush fund". The SFO wrote a letter to Kevin Tebbit at the MoD who notified the Chairman of BAE Systems but not the Secretary of Defence. No further action was taken until the letter was leaked to and reported on by The Guardian in September 2003.

In May 2004, Richard Evans appeared before parliament's defence select committee and said: "I can certainly assure you that we are not in the business of making payments to members of any government."

In October 2004, the BBC's Money Programme broadcast an in-depth story, including allegations in interviews with Edward Cunningham and another former insider, about the way BAE Systems alleged to have paid bribes to Prince Turki bin Nasser and ran a secret £60 million slush fund in relation to the Al Yamamah deal. Most of the money was alleged to have been spent through a front company called Robert Lee International Limited.

In June 2007 the BBC's investigative programme Panorama alleged that BAE Systems "paid hundreds of millions of pounds to the ex-Saudi ambassador to the US, Prince Bandar bin Sultan".

In his book, David Wearing uses the example of F&C Asset Management, a major institutional investor, who (despite benefiting in the short term) warned the defence procurement minister that it would reduce the efficient functioning of financial markets as a whole. "We believe that, for long term investors, bribery and corruption distort and de-stabilise markets, expose companies to legal liabilities, disadvantage non-corrupt companies and reduce transparency", thus undermining national legislation governing corrupt practices.

=== 1992 NAO report ===
The National Audit Office (NAO) investigated the contracts and did not publicly release its conclusions; the only NAO report ever to be withheld. Official statements about the contents of the report go no further than to state that the then chairman of the Public Accounts Commission, now Lord Sheldon, considered the report in private in February 1992, and said: "I did an investigation and I find no evidence that the MOD made improper payments. I have found no evidence of fraud or corruption. The deal ... complied with Treasury approval and the rules of Government accounting."

In July 2006, John Bourn, the head of the NAO, refused to release a copy to the investigators of an unpublished report into the contract that had been drawn up in 1992.

The MP Harry Cohen said, "This does look like a serious conflict of interest. Sir John did a lot of work at the MoD on Al Yamamah and here we now have the NAO covering up this report." In early 2002 he had proposed an Early Day Motion noting "that there have been ... allegations made of large commission payments made to individuals in Saudi Arabia as part of ... Al Yamamah ... [and] that Osama bin Laden and the Al-Qaeda network have received substantial funds from individuals in Saudi Arabia."

In March 2024 The Guardian discovered the NAO report in Lord Sheldon's archive of papers, which he had donated to the London School of Economics. The Guardian published the report and associated correspondence on its website.

=== Serious Fraud Office investigation ===
The Serious Fraud Office was reported to be considering opening an investigation into an alleged £20 million slush fund on 12 September 2003, the day after The Guardian had published its slush fund story. The SFO also investigated BAE's relationship with Travellers World Limited.

In November 2004, the SFO made two arrests as part of the investigation. BAE Systems stated that they welcomed the investigation and "believe[d] that it would put these matters to rest once and for all".

In late 2005, BAE refused to comply with compulsory production notices for details of its secret offshore payments to the Middle East. The terms of the investigation was for a prosecution under Part 12 of the Anti-terrorism, Crime and Security Act 2001.

==== Threats by the Saudi government ====
At the end of November 2006, when the long-running investigation was threatening to go on for two more years, BAE Systems was negotiating a multibillion-pound sale of Eurofighter Typhoons to Saudi Arabia. According to the BBC the contract was worth £6 billion with 5,000 people directly employed in the manufacture of the Eurofighter, while other reports put the value at £10 billion with 50,000 jobs at stake.

On 1 December, The Daily Telegraph ran a front-page headline suggesting that Saudi Arabia had given the UK ten days to suspend the Serious Fraud Office investigation into BAE/Saudi Arabian transactions or they would take the deal to France, but this threat was played down in other quarters. A French official had said "the situation was complex and difficult ... and there was no indication to suggest the Saudis planned to drop the Eurofighter." This analysis was confirmed by Andrew Brookes, an analyst at the International Institute for Strategic Studies, who said "there could be an element here of trying to scare the SFO off. Will it mean they do not buy the Eurofighter? I doubt it."

There were reports of a systematic PR campaign operated by Tim Bell through newspaper scare stories, letters from business owners and MPs in whose constituencies the factories were located to get the case closed.

Robert Wardle, head of the SFO, also stated (in a later High Court challenge, see below) that he had received a direct threat of a cessation of counterterrorist co-operation from the Saudi Arabian ambassador to the UK, in the first of three meetings held to assess the seriousness of the threat: "as he put it to me, British lives on British streets were at risk".

Article 5 of the OECD Convention on Combating Bribery prohibits the decision to drop investigations into corruption from being influenced by considerations of the national economic interest or the potential effect upon relations with another state. This does not however explicitly exclude grounds of national security.

This prompted the investigation team to consider striking an early guilty plea deal with BAE that would minimise the intrusiveness to Saudi Arabia and mitigate damage. The Attorney General agreed the strategy, but briefed Prime Minister Blair, who in a reply dated 5 December 2006 urged that the case be dropped. Despite affirming his government's commitment to bribery prosecution, he stressed the financial and counter-terrorism implications. That same day, Prince Bandar met with Foreign Office officials, after spending a week with Jacques Chirac to negotiate a French alternative to the BAE deal.

A week later, after consultation with the SFO, the Attorney General met with Blair to argue against dropping the case. It was Blair's opinion that "Any proposal that the investigation be resolved by parties pleading guilty to certain charges would be unlikely to reduce the offence caused to the Saudi Royal Family, even if the deal were accepted, and the process would still drag out for a considerable period".

On 13 December, the Director of the SFO wrote to the Attorney General to inform him that the SFO was dropping the investigation and would not be looking into the Swiss bank accounts, citing "real and imminent damage to the UK's national and international security and would endanger the lives of British citizens and service personnel".

==== Investigation discontinued ====
On 14 December 2006, the Attorney General Lord Goldsmith announced that the investigation was being discontinued on grounds of public interest. The 15-strong team had been ordered to turn in their files two days before. The statement in the House of Lords read:

The Director of the Serious Fraud Office has decided to discontinue the investigation into the affairs of BAE Systems plc as far as they relate to the Al Yamamah defence contract. This decision has been taken following representations that have been made both to the Attorney General and the Director concerning the need to safeguard national and international security. It has been necessary to balance the need to maintain the rule of law against the wider public interest. No weight has been given to commercial interests or to the national economic interest.

Prime Minister Tony Blair justified the decision by saying "Our relationship with Saudi Arabia is vitally important for our country in terms of counter-terrorism, in terms of the broader Middle East, in terms of helping in respect of Israel and Palestine. That strategic interest comes first."

Jonathan Aitken, a former Conservative government minister and convicted perjurer, who was connected with the deals in the 1980s, said that even if the allegations against BAE were true, it was correct to end the investigation to maintain good relations with Saudi Arabia.

Mark Pieth, director of anti-fraud section at the OECD, on behalf of France, Greece, Japan, Sweden, Switzerland and the United States, addressed a formal complaint letter before Christmas 2006 to the Foreign Office, seeking explanation as to why the investigation had been discontinued. Transparency International and Labour MP Roger Berry, chairman of the Commons Quadripartite Committee, urged the government to reopen the corruption investigation.

In a newspaper interview, Robert Wardle, head of the Serious Fraud Office, acknowledged that the decision to terminate the investigation may have damaged "the reputation of the UK as a place which is determined to stamp out corruption".

Delivery of the first two Eurofighter Typhoon aircraft (of 72 purchased by the Saudi Air Force) took place in June 2009.

==== Judicial review ====
A judicial review of the decision by the SFO to drop the investigation was granted on 9 November 2007. On 10 April 2008 the High Court of Justice ruled that the SFO acted unlawfully by dropping its investigation. The Times described the ruling as "one of the most strongly worded judicial attacks on government action" which condemned how "ministers "buckled" to "blatant threats" that Saudi cooperation in the fight against terror would end unless the ... investigation was dropped."

On 24 April the SFO was granted leave to appeal to the House of Lords against the ruling. There was a two-day hearing before the Lords on 7 and 8 July 2008. On 30 July the House of Lords unanimously overturned the High Court ruling, stating that the decision to discontinue the investigation was lawful.

=== OECD investigation ===
The OECD sent their inspectors to the UK to establish the reasons behind the dropping of the investigation in March 2007. The OECD also wished to establish why the UK had yet to bring a prosecution since the incorporation of the OECD's anti-bribery treaty into British law.

=== US Department of Justice investigation ===
On 26 June 2007 BAE announced that the United States Department of Justice had launched its own investigation into Al Yamamah. It was looking into allegations that a US bank had been used to funnel payments to Prince Bandar. The Riggs Bank has been mentioned in some accounts. On 19 May 2008, BAE confirmed that its CEO Mike Turner and non-executive director Nigel Rudd had been detained "for about 20 minutes" at George Bush Intercontinental and Newark airports respectively the previous week and that the DOJ had issued "a number of additional subpoenas in the US to employees of BAE Systems plc and BAE Systems Inc as part of its ongoing investigation". The Times suggested that, according to Alexandra Wrage of Trace International, such "humiliating behaviour by the DOJ" is unusual towards a company that is co-operating fully.

Under a plea bargain with the US Department of Justice BAE was sentenced in March 2010 by US District Court Judge John D. Bates to pay a $400 million fine, one of the largest fines in the history of the DOJ. US District Judge John Bates said the company's conduct involved "deception, duplicity and knowing violations of law, I think it's fair to say, on an enormous scale". BAE was not convicted of bribery, and is thus not internationally blacklisted from future contracts.

== See also ==
- Lockheed bribery scandals
- Saudi Arabia–United Kingdom relations
- Wafic Saïd
