= BAE Systems Digital Intelligence =

Defence and security technology company

BAE Systems Digital Intelligence and Land
- Formerly: BAE Systems Applied Intelligence, BAE Systems Detica and Detica
- Type: Private
- Industry: Software
- Founded: 1971
- Headquarters: Guildford, Surrey, UK
- Key people: Andrea Thompson (Group Managing Director)
- Products: Azalea, DataRetain, DataBridge, Cross Domain, IntelligenceReveal
- Number of employees: 4,500 (2024)
- Parent: BAE Systems
- Website: baesystems.com/digital

BAE Systems Digital Intelligence and Land (formerly Detica, then BAE Systems Applied Intelligence) is a British defence and security technology firm owned by BAE Systems. Its products include software for cybersecurity, surveillance and data analysis.

== History ==
The business was founded in 1971 as Smith Associates, carrying out research on defence matters for the UK Government. It was incorporated in 1977 and renamed Detica in 2001. It was first listed on the London Stock Exchange in 2002.

In 2003 Detica acquired Rubus, an information technology services company. It went on to launch Streamshield, an internet security software product, in 2004. In 2005 Detica acquired Extraprise UK, a systems integrator. In 2006 it bought the consultancy Evolution, the computer forensics business Inforenz and a financial service consultancy M.A. Partners. In 2007 it acquired the US homeland security consultancy DFI International.

In July 2008, prospects of a bidding war for Detica emerged after BAE Systems made an informal offer. On 28 July 2008 the board of Detica and BAE Systems announced that the latter had made a formal cash offer of £9.40 for all issued and to-be-issued share capital. After acquiring over 92% of outstanding shares with shareholder approval, BAE declared its offer for Detica unconditional on 25 September 2008.

In 2010, BAE Systems acquired Stratsec, the largest cyber security consultancy in Australia. In 2011, BAE Systems acquired the Irish Norkom Technologies, a financial crime and financial compliance software maker, and the Danish cyber and intelligence company ETI/AS, which previously helped law enforcement and telecommunication providers in data-crime investigations. In 2013 it won an 8-year UK government service contract for the Foreign and Commonwealth Office, and partnered with Vodafone for smartphone and tablet security services.

On 1 February 2014, BAE Systems Detica was renamed BAE Systems Applied Intelligence to reflect its ambitions for more global growth across its "Applied Intelligence portfolio".

In October 2014, Kevin Taylor was appointed as managing director, following Martin Sutherland's departure to De La Rue.

In December 2014, BAE Systems Applied Intelligence acquired Perimeter Internetworking Corp., trading as SilverSky, a commercial cyber services provider.

In May 2017, Julian Cracknell took over from Kevin Taylor as managing director.

In June 2017, an investigation by the BBC and the Danish newspaper Dagbladet Information showed that BAE Systems Applied Intelligence had been selling a mass surveillance technology called Evident to the governments of Saudi Arabia, the United Arab Emirates, Qatar, Oman, Morocco and Algeria. An anonymous former employee of ETI, the Danish company which developed Evident and was bought by BAE Systems in 2011, told the BBC: "[With Evident,] you'd be able to intercept any internet traffic. If you wanted to do a whole country, you could. You could pin-point people's location based on cellular data. You could follow people around. They were quite far ahead with voice recognition. They were capable of decrypting stuff as well." As the countries this equipment was sold to have poor human-rights records, there was criticism of the sales from campaign groups like Campaign Against Arms Trade and Privacy International. In response to the accusations, BAE Systems claimed: ""BAE systems works for a number of organisations around the world within the regulatory framework of all relevant countries and within our responsible trading principles."

During the Danish Business Authority's processing of the company's application to be allowed to export to Saudi Arabia, Oman, and Qatar, it asked the Ministry of Foreign Affairs to assess whether there was a risk of the product being used for human rights violations, as required by EU law, to which the full response was, each time, "the Ministry of Foreign Affairs finds no reason to object to the attached application".

In February 2022, BAE Systems has formed a new Digital Intelligence business, bringing together digital, data and cyber capabilities from across the company (including the Applied Intelligence, CORDA and Defence Information business units and recently acquired In-Space Missions, PPM and TechModal), with the aim of delivering a greater digital advantage to its customers and partners.

On 12 July 2022 the company announced that its financial services business, which includes its flagship NetReveal® financial crime detection solution, was sold to enterprise AI SaaS company SymphonyAI. The sale completed on 31 October 2022.

On 31 October 2023, the company announced the acquisition of Eurostep, a secure data sharing company headquartered in Sweden who will deliver advanced digital asset management.

== Operations ==
The company has four specialist areas of expertise: cyber security, data and digital solutions, space systems and battlespace integration.

== Offices ==
The company head office is in Guildford in the United Kingdom, with branch offices in 19 countries across Europe, North America, Australia, and Southeast Asia. The business operates in Europe, North America and Asia Pacific.
