= Senior plc =

Manufacturing company

- Type: Public
- Traded as: LSE: SNR
- Industry: Manufacturing
- Founded: 1933
- Headquarters: Rickmansworth, England, UK
- Key people: Ian King (Chairman); David Squires (CEO)
- Products: Components and systems for vehicle and aerospace manufacturers and energy producers
- Revenue: ▲£738.2 million (2025)
- Operating income: ▲£47.3 million (2025)
- Net income: ▼£(4.2) million (2025)
- Number of employees: 4,974 (2025)
- Website: www.seniorplc.com

Senior plc is the holding company for a global group of firms in the manufacturing and engineering industries, headquartered in Rickmansworth, England. The Company was listed on the London Stock Exchange and was a constituent of the FTSE 250 Index until it was acquired by Tinicum Inc. and Blackstone Private Investments Advisors in October 2026.

== History ==
Senior was originally established in 1933 by a group of former employees of Green's Economisers Ltd. as a rival concern. The company was listed on the London Stock Exchange as Senior Economisers Limited in 1947.

It acquired GAMFG Precision LLC, a manufacturer of machined components and assemblies for the off-road land vehicle and aerospace markets, for US$45.0 million in 2012.

It then bought Atlas Composites, a manufacturer of composite structures and tooling in 2013. It also bought Thermal Engineering, a supplier of high temperature lightweight aerospace components, for £22 million in 2013.

It bought UPECA Technologies, a Malaysian-based manufacturer of high-precision engineered components serving the aerospace and energy sectors, in 2014.

It acquired Lymington Precision Engineering, a manufacturer of precision-machined components, fabrications, assemblies and kit sets, for a minimum of £45.8 million in 2015. It also bought Steico Industries, a manufacturer of precision tube and duct assemblies for the commercial and defence aerospace industries, for £59 million in 2015.

In June 2021 the company rejected a $1.2 billion buyout offer from US private-equity firm Lone Star.

A private equity firm, Sullivan Street Partners, completed the acquisition of the company's former Aerostructures business in January 2026.

In March 2026, Senior received a takeover proposal from Tinicum Inc. and Blackstone Private Investments Advisors. The company also confirmed that it had received approaches from four other businesses including the private equity firm, Advent International. In April 2026, the takeover offer from Tinicum and Blackstone, worth $1.9 billion, was accepted. The acquisition was approved by the court on 6 October 2026, so allowing the transaction to proceed to completion.

== Operations ==
Senior's constituent companies are grouped in two divisions: Aerospace, which manufactures components and systems for clients in the aerospace industry; and Flexonics, which primarily supplies the automotive and energy industries.

== Financial information ==
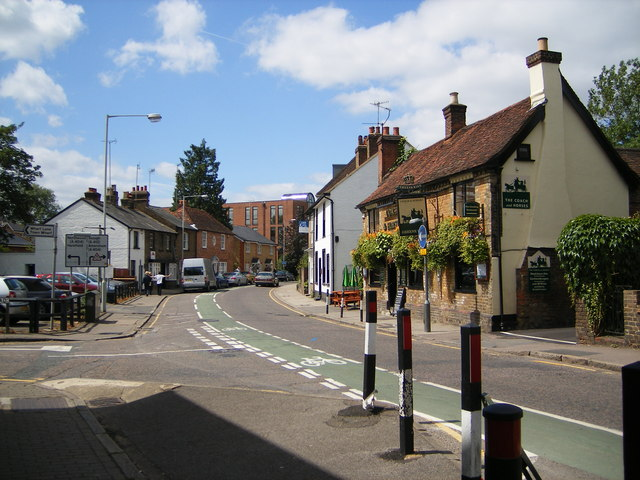
High Street, Rickmansworth: Senior plc's head office is the modern building in the background

Financial results have been as follows:

Senior plc financial results.
Year to December	Revenue (£million)	EBIT (£m)	Net profit (£m)	Earnings per share (p)
2025	738.2	47.3	(4.2)	(1.0)
2024	977.1	40.3	25.9	6.3
2023	963.5	37.9	31.1	7.5
2022	848.4	32.5	20.2	4.9
2021	658.7	10.5	24.2	5.8
2020	733.6	(177.3)	(158.5)	(38.2)
2019	1,110.7	61.6	29.2	7.0
2018	1,082.1	69.9	50.1	16.1
2017	1,023.4	65.5	60.3	14.4
2016	917.0	65.8	45.4	10.8
2015	849.5	72.3	48.5	11.6
2014	820.8	89.6	63.5	15.3
2013	775.1	93.3	71.4	17.2
2012	712.0	94.5	66.6	17.1
2011	640.7	83.0	55.0	13.7
2010	566.9	62.2	40.4	10.1
2009	540.1	61.0	39.0	8.9
2008	562.4	59.8	39.2	10.6
2007	470.7	41.5	27.9	7.7
2006	387.9	24.5	15.2	4.7
2005	338.6	19.6	12.1	3.8
2004	306.8	17.1	6.5	3.4
2003	322.9	18.9	4.6	3.0

Note: Accounts to 2003 prepared according to United Kingdom Generally Accepted Accounting Principles. Accounts from 2004 onwards prepared according to International Financial Reporting Standards.
