= ETI Telecom =

IT company

ETI Telecom or ETI was an IT company headquartered in Nørresundby. The company was bought in 2010 for 1.2 billion DKK by British BAE Systems (which, in 2019, was ranked the fourth-most profitable weapons company by USA Today in the world [except in China, due to lacking data] with an annual profit of 1.1 billion USD). In 2012, SKAT accused the company of tax evasion, claiming it had failed to pay 104.6 million DKK.

An investigation by BBC and Dagbladet Information in June 2017 revealed that BAE Systems has sold a surveillance system called Evident, produced by ETI Telecom, to the governments of Saudi Arabia, UAE, Qatar, Oman, Morocco and Algeria. ETI also produced equipment for former Tunisian president Zine El Abidine Ben Ali. An anonymous former employee at ETI told Information: "With the system we built, one will be able to listen in on all forms of internet traffic. Do you wish to surveil an entire country? Is easily doable. One can see the precis locations of individuals based on phone activity. One can follow their route. Also, the company was far in the development of voice recognition. They could also decrypt things." As the buyer countries have a poor record of securing human rights, the sale was criticized by groups such as Amnesty International and Privacy International.

During the Danish Business Authority's processing of the company's application to be allowed to export to Saudi Arabia, Oman and Qatar, it asked the Ministry of Foreign Affairs to assess whether there was a risk of the product being used for human rights violations, as required by EU law, to which the full response was, each time, "the Ministry of Foreign Affairs finds no reason to object to the attached application".

A few months after these revelations, BAE Systems shut down their Danish branch, firing 160 employees.
