= John Weston (businessman) =

John Pix Weston CBE FREng FRAeS
- Occupations: Businessman; aerospace executive
- Years active: 1970–present
- Employer: British Aerospace / BAE Systems (former)
- Known for: Leadership in transforming British Aerospace into BAE Systems; role in Al Yamamah negotiations
- Title: Chief Executive — British Aerospace / BAE Systems (1998–2002)
- Awards: CBE; Commander of the Order of the Pole Star (Sweden); Fellow of the Royal Academy of Engineering (FREng); Freeman of the City of London

John Pix Weston is a British businessman.

== Background ==
Weston was employed by BAE Systems and its predecessors from when he left university until he was ousted as CEO in 2002. In 2004 the Financial Times described Weston as one of a "core group" who turned British Aerospace (a predecessor of BAE Systems) around, along with Evans, Richard Lapthorne and his successor Mike Turner. Weston was one of the members of the British party who travelled to Bermuda to sign the Al Yamamah contract with Saudi Arabia. By 2006 this had yielded over £40 billion to British Aerospace and BAE Systems.

He joined the British Aircraft Corporation at Weybridge in January 1970, as an undergraduate apprentice. He worked as a dynamics and a sales engineer and spent seven years working in Munich for the international management company established to run the Tornado programme, then Europe's largest collaborative military programme, which brought together the skills of the German, Italian and British aerospace industries.

This was followed by a secondment to the Ministry of Defence, to work with the government in promoting the sale of military aircraft. On his return to British Aerospace he took responsibility for the company’s Saudi Arabian operations. In 1990 he became Managing Director of the Military Aircraft, which then employed 27,000 people, with annual sales of £3.5 billion. In 1992 he became Chairman of the British Aerospace Defence businesses which accounted for 75% of the parent company's operations. He was appointed CBE in the 1994 New Year Honours.

In 1998 he became Chief Executive of British Aerospace. During his tenure, British Aerospace was transformed into the new BAE Systems company. This took it from an organisation with sales of around £7.5 billion and 55,000 employees, located mainly in the UK, to an international group which handles sales of £12.5 billion, and 120,000 employees.

Leaving BAE, from 2002 until 2006, Weston was the non-executive chairman of Spirent PLC, a world leader in telecoms testing equipment, telephone network components, software and services. During this period the market capitalisation of the company increased 5 times. In May 2003 he also became Chairman of Acra Control, a Dublin based avionics company manufacturing digital data collection devices for flight test instrumentation systems. In January 2004 he also became non executive chairman of Inbis PLC, a UK based engineering design consultancy business focusing mainly on the aerospace and nuclear sectors. In April 2005 the business was sold to Assystem-Brime. In June 2004 he became non-executive chairman of the University for Industry (Learn-Direct), a UK government initiative to provide on-line learning. In its short history the UFI offers around 400,000 courses and has enrolled around 3 million learners.

In November 2005 he became Chairman of iSOFT PLC, a leading supplier of software applications to the British National Health Service, and to the international healthcare industry. He has led the turn-round of this business, restoring it to profitability and achieving a successful sale of the business. In April 2007 he became Chairman of Insensys Ltd, a manufacturer of optical strain gauging for the wind energy and aerospace sectors. In December 2006 he became chairman of MB Aerospace, a Glasgow based aerospace machining and design engineering business.

Weston is a vice-president of the Royal United Services Institute. He is a director of the German-British Forum and a member of the council of the Ditchley foundation. In addition to his CBE he is also a Commander of the Order of the Pole Star (Sweden), a fellow of the Royal Academy of Engineering and a freeman of the City of London.

He is a passionate skier, a keen photographer, mountain walker and tinkers with computers. He lives with his wife and two children in Surrey.
