= Charles Woodburn =

British businessman (born 1971)

Charles Woodburn CBE
- Born: Charles Nicholas Woodburn; March 11, 1971 (age 55); Windsor, Berkshire, England
- Education: University of Cambridge; Erasmus University Rotterdam
- Occupation: Businessman
- Title: CEO, BAE Systems
- Term: July 2017-
- Predecessor: Ian King
- Board member of: Board of Trade; Aerospace, Security and Defence Industries Association of Europe; Confederation of British Industry Defence and Economic Taskforce
- Children: 2

Charles Nicholas Woodburn CBE (born 11 March 1971) is a British businessman who has been the CEO of BAE Systems since July 2017.

== Education ==
Woodburn was born on 11 March 1971 and went to Dr Challoner's Grammar School in Amersham, England. Woodburn earned a bachelor's degree in electrical sciences from St John's College, Cambridge, in 1992 and a PhD in engineering from Cambridge University, followed by an MBA from Erasmus University Rotterdam.

== Career ==
Woodburn began his career in 1995, working for the oil services company Schlumberger. From 2010 to 2016, he was the chief executive of Expro Group. In May 2016, Woodburn joined BAE Systems as its chief operating officer. Following the retirement of Ian King, Woodburn was appointed CEO of BAE in July 2017.

In December 2024, Woodburn was one of six executives sanctioned by the Chinese government over arms sales to Taiwan.

In March 2025, Woodburn joined the UK government's Board of Trade as a board adviser.

== Honours and recognition ==
Woodburn was appointed Commander of the Order of the British Empire (CBE) in the 2024 New Year Honours for support of the Ukrainian military and his involvement with international partnerships including AUKUS and the Global Combat Air Programme. He was elected a Fellow of the Royal Academy of Engineering in 2020.

== Personal life ==
Woodburn is married with two children and lives in Surrey.
