= Dick Olver =

British businessman (born 1947)

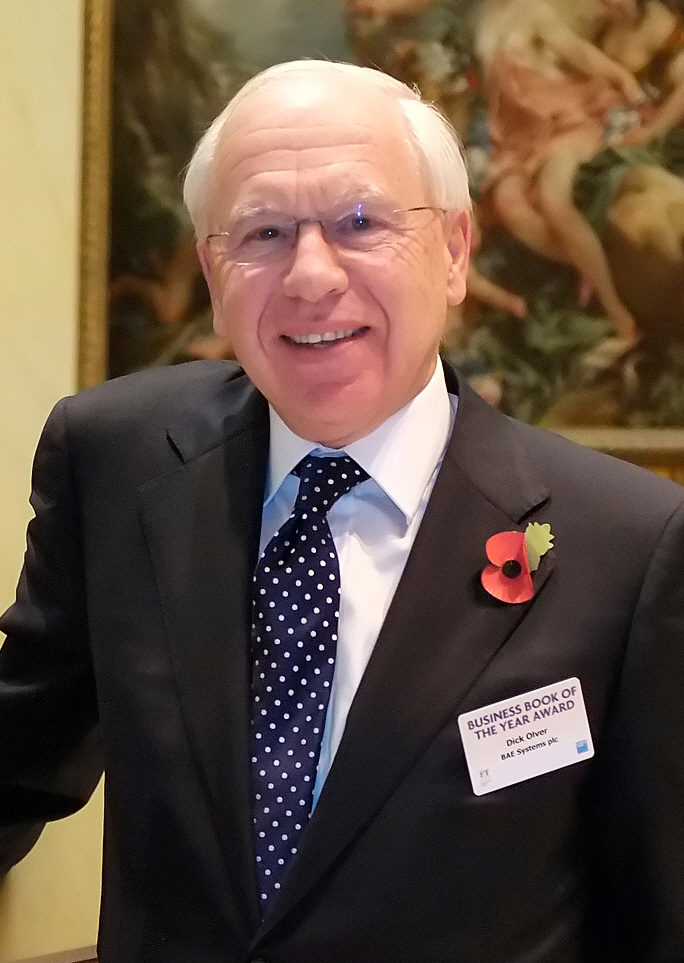
Dick Olver at FT Goldman Sachs Business Book of the Year Award 2011

Sir Richard Lake Olver FREng (born 2 January 1947) was the chairman of BAE Systems, one of the world's largest defence contractors.

== Biography ==
=== Early life ===
Richard Olver was born on 2 January 1947. He studied at City University London, where he gained a first class honours degree in Civil Engineering.

=== Career ===
Olver joined BP in 1973 and over the course of his 30+ years with the company rose to become deputy group chief executive in 2003. His early career involved a wide range of oil, gas and refining projects in Britain, Canada, Scotland, the Middle East and Norway. He was appointed vice-president, BP Pipelines Inc, BP North America, in 1979. In 1983, he became divisional manager for new technology with responsibility for offshore, Arctic and enhanced oil recovery technology development. In 1985, he became divisional manager of corporate planning and led the strategic team on the acquisition by BP of Standard Oil in the United States. In 1988, he became general manager, Gas, BP Exploration Europe, responsible for the operation, new business development and asset management, of BP and Britoil's European gas portfolio.

He was made chief of staff to the chairman of BP and head of corporate strategy for the BP Group in May 1990. In April 1992 he became chief executive, BP Exploration, USA. In 1995, he became deputy chief executive of BP Exploration. He was appointed to the board of BP and became CEO of Exploration and Production in 1998. He led the Upstream E&P business of BP for 5 years taking the business from 1.5mboepd to 3.6mboepd through the merger with Amoco and the acquisition of ARCO, thereby more than doubling the size of the business and generating $20bn/yr operating cash. He was then appointed deputy CEO in January 2003 and served in that role until his departure for BAE Systems plc in July 2004. He continued his association with BP as deputy chairman of TNK-BP until 2006.

Olver became the non-executive chairman of BAE Systems on 1 July 2004. He replaced Sir Richard Evans, who had served with BAE Systems and its predecessor companies for over 30 years.

He was a non-executive director of Reuters and Thomson Reuters from 1997-2008 and a member of former Prime Minister Gordon Brown's Business Council for Britain from 2009 to 2010. He is a former member of Prime Minister David Cameron's Business Advisory Group and also serves as a UK Business Ambassador. He is an adviser to Clayton, Dubilier & Rice and HSBC and a board member of SandHill Petroleum BV and EdgeMarc LLC

=== Civic service ===
Olver was chairman of the Royal Academy of Engineering's Education for Engineering (E4E) Policy Group whose membership is drawn from the chief executives of the professional engineering institutions, the Engineering Council, Engineering UK and the Royal Academy. Under Olver's chairmanship, the E4E Policy Group had major successes in influencing government policy in education. He also chaired the Academy's Development Advisory Board which is committed to raising the recognition of the contribution engineering and engineers make to the health and wealth of UK society. He is also a Fellow of the Institution of Civil Engineers and a Fellow of the City and Guilds of London Institute. He was awarded an honorary doctorate in Science from City University, London in November 2004 and was awarded a second honorary doctorate in Science from Cranfield University In June 2006. He was elected as a Fellow of The Royal Academy of Engineering in July 2005 and served on the Academy's Council from 2006 to 2009. He was awarded the President's Medal in 2015 for services to the Academy and to the nation in education.

He was awarded the non-executive director (NED) of the Year Award at the 6th annual NED Awards sponsored by The Sunday Times in March 2012. He was knighted in the 2013 Birthday Honours for services to business and contribution to UK corporate governance.
