= Norkom =

Norkom Technologies
- Company type: Public
- Industry: Financial services
- Founded: 1998; 28 years ago
- Headquarters: Dublin, Ireland
- Key people: Paul Kerley
- Products: Anti-crime software
- Owner: BAE Systems

Norkom Technologies was a provider of financial services and anti-crime software, founded in Dublin in 1998. In November 2004, it signed an agreement to acquire Belgium-based risk management firm Data4s. In 2011, it was acquired by BAE Systems and merged into its subsidiary Detica (now BAE Systems Applied Intelligence).
