= Ian King (businessman) =

British businessman (born 1956)

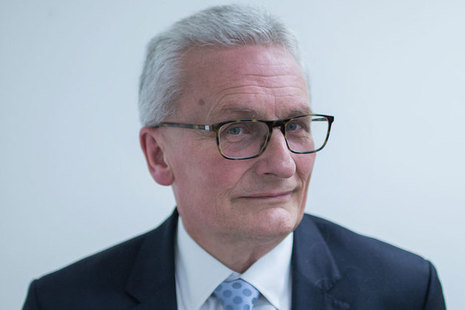
- King in 2021
- Born: 24 April 1956 (age 70)
- Occupation: Businessman
- Years active: 1977–present
- Title: former CEO BAE Systems
- Term: 2008 – 30 June 2017
- Predecessor: Michael Turner
- Successor: Charles Woodburn
- Spouse: married
- Children: 1

Ian Graham King CBE (born 24 April 1956) is a British businessman who was the CEO of BAE Systems from 2008 to 2017. Until 20 June 2014, he was a non-executive director of Rotork plc. He is currently Chairman of Senior plc.

== Career ==
BAE Systems was created by a merger of Marconi Electronic Systems and British Aerospace. King joined BAE from Marconi. Previous roles include chief executive officer (CEO) of Alenia Marconi Systems, a partnership between Marconi and Finmeccanica, Finance Director and Deputy managing director of Marconi Electronic Systems and non-Executive Director of the Canadian Marconi Company.

When BAE Systems was created in November 1999, King was named Group Strategy & Planning Director. In December 2000, King was appointed group managing director of BAE Systems Customer Solutions and Support.

In November 2006, BAE Systems appointed King chief operating officer from 1 January 2007. He was promoted in what The Financial Times described as "in part... to improve relations with the MoD further". This followed a general improvement in relations since acrimony in 2003. The previous co-COOs were Chris Geoghegan and Steve Mogford. The Independent described King's appointment as COO as part of the "succession battle" to succeed BAE CEO Michael Turner.

=== CEO ===
In October 2007, BAE Systems announced that its CEO Mike Turner would step down from his role in 2008. While King was always named as a candidate to replace him as CEO, press reports suggested BAE would prefer an American CEO due to the increasing importance of the United States defence market to the company and the opportunity to make a clean break from corruption allegations and investigations related to the Al Yamamah contracts. However, on 27 June 2008, BAE announced that it had selected King to succeed Turner with effect from 1 September 2008; The Financial Times noted that King's career at Marconi distances him from the British Aerospace-led Al Yamamah project. For this role he was paid an annual base salary of £982,300.

King announced his intended retirement, on 30 June 2017, to the board on 22 February. It was confirmed that Charles Woodburn, the Chief Operating Officer, would be appointed in his place.

== Personal life ==
He is married with one son, and lives in Portsmouth.
