= UPECA Aerotech =

Aerostructure supplier to Spirit Aerosystems

UPECA Aerotech Sdn. Bhd.
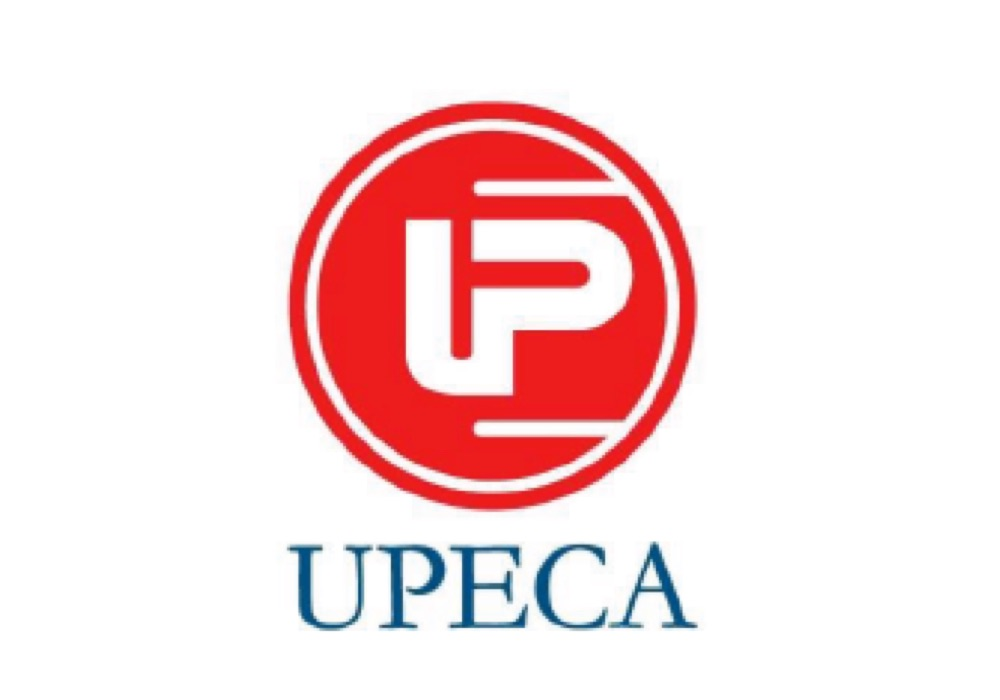
- Company type: Private Limited Company
- Industry: Aerospace
- Founded: 2005
- Headquarters: Shah Alam, Malaysia
- Key people: Kavan Jeet Singh, CEO
- Products: Aerostructures
- Parent: Senior plc
- Website: www.upeca.com/aerotech/en/index.aspx/

UPECA Aerotech Sdn. Bhd. informally known as UPECA, is a part of Senior plc. It is the one of Malaysia's largest aerostructure suppliers to Spirit Aerosystems Europe and UTC Aerospace System. UPECA Aerotech's headquarters and manufacturing plant is in Shah Alam, Selangor. UPECA Aerotech supply aircraft components on Airbus A320, Airbus A330, Airbus A350 and Boeing 787 platforms. A manufacturing plant will be opened near Subang Airport in order to serve UPECA's manufacturing, storage and distribution of aerospace parts.

== History ==
UPECA Technologies, the parent company, was incorporated in 1990. UPECA Aerotech was established in 2005 in order to support the Malaysian government's aspirations to develop the nation's aerospace manufacturing industry. Senior plc, a United Kingdom maker of parts for the aircraft and the vehicle industries, bought UPECA Technologies in order to expand its business in the growing Asian market.
