= BAE Systems Regional Aircraft =

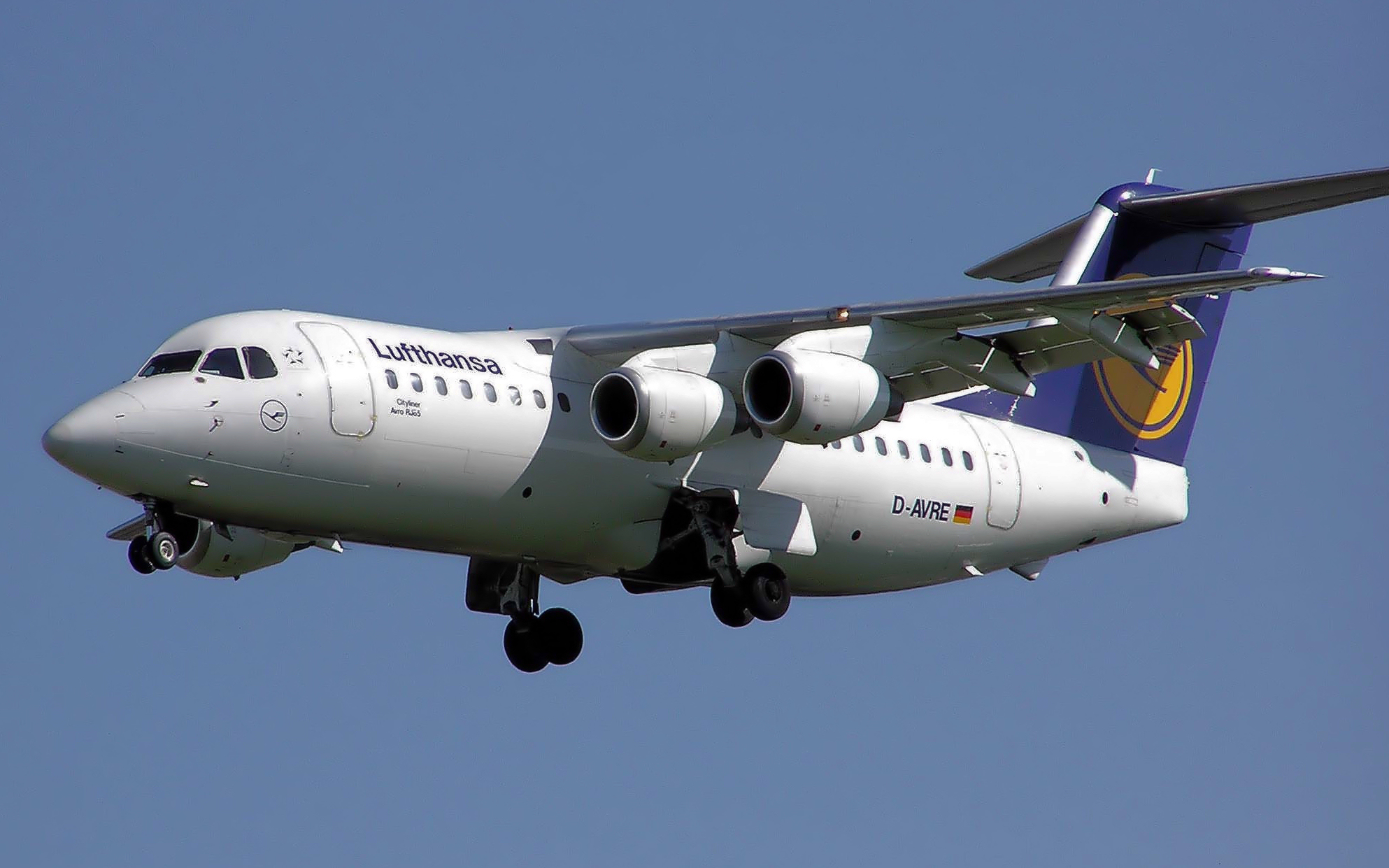
An Avro RJ85. BAE Systems Regional Aircraft still leases a large number of these jets.

BAE Systems Regional Aircraft produced the last fully UK-built airliner in November 2001 and owned by BAE Systems, the Avro RJX (formerly the BAE 146). While this business unit no longer manufactures commercial regional airliners, it continues to lease aircraft and provide support, spares, and training for its legacy products:

- Avro RJ/BAE 146 family
- BAe ATP
- Jetstream
- BAe 748

The decision to end the production of the Avro RJ series was taken following the sharp downturn in aircraft sales following the September 11, 2001 attacks. British Aerospace (BAE's predecessor) had already left the corporate jet market in 1993, with the sale of British Aerospace Corporate Jets Ltd. (producers of the mid-sized British Aerospace BAe 125 line) to Raytheon, but had maintained the regional jet division. Its remaining commercial aerostructures manufacturing business was sold to Spirit AeroSystems in 2006. Regional Aircraft's headquarters are located at Prestwick International Airport.
