= BAE Systems =

British defence, security and aerospace company

Coordinates: 51°16′25″N 0°46′00″W

BAE Systems plc
- Formerly: British Aerospace Limited (1979–1981); British Aerospace Public Limited Company (1981–2000)
- Type: Public
- Traded as: LSE: BA. FTSE 100 Component
- Industry: Aerospace, arms and information security
- Predecessors: British Aerospace; Marconi Electronic Systems
- Founded: 30 November 1999; 26 years ago
- Headquarters: London, England, UK
- Area served: Worldwide
- Key people: Cressida Hogg (chair); Charles Woodburn (CEO)
- Revenue: ▲£28.336 billion (2025)
- Operating income: ▲£2.925 billion (2025)
- Net income: ▲£2.151 billion (2025)
- Total assets: ▼£37.679 billion (2025)
- Total equity: ▲£11.937 billion (2025)
- Number of employees: 110,000 (2026)
- Subsidiaries: BAE Systems Inc.; BAE Systems Australia; BAE Systems Digital Intelligence
- Website: baesystems.com

BAE Systems plc is a British multinational aerospace, arms and information security company, based in London. It is the largest manufacturer in Britain as of 2017. It is the largest defence contractor in Europe and the sixth largest in the world based on applicable 2024 revenues. Its largest operations are in the United Kingdom and in the United States. Its next biggest markets are Saudi Arabia, then Australia; other major markets include Canada, Japan, India, Turkey, Qatar, Oman and Sweden. The company was formed on 30 November 1999 by the £7.7 billion purchase and merger of Marconi Electronic Systems (MES), the defence electronics and naval shipbuilding subsidiary of the General Electric Company plc (GEC), with British Aerospace, an aircraft, munitions and naval systems manufacturer.

BAE Systems is the successor to various aircraft, shipbuilding, armoured vehicle, armaments and defence electronics companies, including the Marconi Company, the first commercial company devoted to the development and use of radio; A.V. Roe and Company, one of the world's first aircraft companies; de Havilland, manufacturer of the Comet, the world's first commercial jet airliner; Hawker Siddeley, manufacturer of the Harrier, the world's first VTOL attack aircraft; British Aircraft Corporation, co-manufacturer of the Concorde supersonic transport; Supermarine, manufacturer of the Spitfire; Yarrow Shipbuilders, builder of the Royal Navy's first destroyers; Fairfield Shipbuilding and Engineering Company, builder of the world's first battlecruiser; and Vickers Shipbuilding and Engineering, builder of the Royal Navy's first submarines.

Since its 1999 formation, BAE Systems has made a number of acquisitions, most notably of Ball Aerospace, United Defense and Armor Holdings of the United States, and has sold its shares in Airbus, Astrium, AMS and Atlas Elektronik. It is involved in several major defence projects, including the Lockheed Martin F-35 Lightning II, the Eurofighter Typhoon, and the Astute, Dreadnought and SSN-AUKUS submarines. BAE is listed on the London Stock Exchange's FTSE 100 Index.

== History ==
=== Predecessors ===
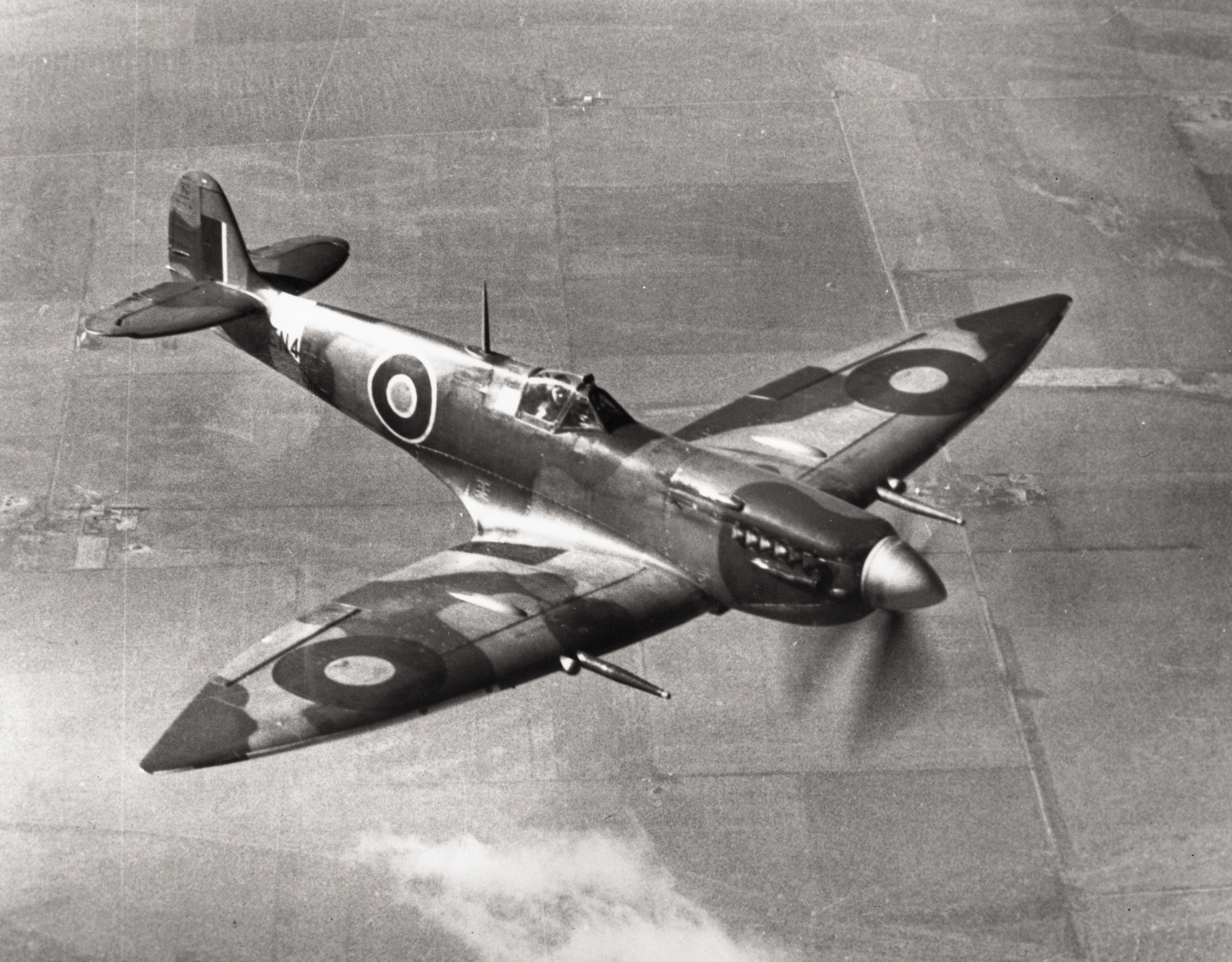
Supermarine, the manufacturer of the Spitfire, was a predecessor company of BAE Systems. It was purchased by Vickers-Armstrongs, which itself was merged into the British Aircraft Corporation in 1960.

British Aerospace bought Marconi Electronic Systems for £7.7 billion on 30 November 1999 and merged with it to form BAE Systems. The company is the successor to many of the most famous British aircraft, defence electronics and warship manufacturers. Predecessor companies built the Comet, the world's first commercial jet airliner; the Harrier "jump jet", the world's first operational vertical/short take-off and landing (VTOL) aircraft; the "groundbreaking" Blue Vixen radar carried by Sea Harrier FA2s and which formed the basis of the Eurofighter's CAPTOR radar; and co-produced the Concorde supersonic airliner with Aérospatiale.

British Aerospace was a civil and military aircraft manufacturer, as well as a provider of military land systems. The company had emerged from the massive consolidation of UK aircraft manufacturers since World War II. British Aerospace was formed on 29 April 1977, by the nationalisation and merger of the British Aircraft Corporation (BAC), the Hawker Siddeley Group and Scottish Aviation. Both BAC and Hawker Siddeley were themselves the result of various mergers and acquisitions.

Marconi Electronic Systems was the defence subsidiary of British engineering firm the General Electric Company (GEC), dealing largely in military systems integration, as well as naval and land systems. Marconi's heritage dates back to Guglielmo Marconi's Wireless Telegraph & Signal Company, founded in 1897. GEC purchased English Electric (which included Marconi) in 1968 and thereafter used the Marconi brand for its defence businesses (as GEC-Marconi and later Marconi Electronic Systems). GEC's own defence heritage dates back to World War I, when its contribution to the war effort included radios and bulbs. World War II consolidated this position, as the company was involved in important technological advances, notably the cavity magnetron for radar. Between 1945 and 1999, GEC-Marconi/Marconi Electronic Systems became one of the world's most important defence contractors. GEC's major defence related acquisitions included Associated Electrical Industries in 1967, Yarrow Shipbuilders in 1985, Plessey companies in 1989, parts of Ferranti's defence business in 1990, the rump of Ferranti when it went into receivership in 1993/1994, Vickers Shipbuilding and Engineering in 1995 and Kværner Govan in 1999. In June 1998, MES acquired Tracor, a major American defence contractor, for £830 million (about US$1.4 billion).

=== Formation ===
The 1997 merger of American corporations Boeing and McDonnell Douglas, which followed the formation in 1995 of Lockheed Martin, the world's largest defence contractor, increased the pressure on European defence companies to consolidate. In June 1997, British Aerospace Defence managing director John Weston commented "Europe ... is supporting three times the number of contractors on less than half the budget of the US." European governments wished to see the merger of their defence manufacturers into a single entity, a "European Aerospace and Defence Company".

As early as 1995, British Aerospace and the German aerospace and defence company DaimlerChrysler Aerospace (DASA) were said to be keen to create a transnational aerospace and defence company. The two companies envisaged including Aérospatiale, the other major European aerospace company, but only after its privatisation. The first stage of this integration was seen as the transformation of Airbus from a consortium of British Aerospace, DASA, Aérospatiale and Construcciones Aeronáuticas SA into an integrated company; with this aim British Aerospace and DASA were united against the various objections of Aérospatiale. As well as Airbus, British Aerospace and DASA were partners in the Panavia Tornado and Eurofighter Typhoon aircraft projects. Merger discussions began between British Aerospace and DASA in July 1998, just as French participation became more likely with the announcement that Aérospatiale was to merge with Matra and emerge with a diluted French government shareholding. A merger was agreed between British Aerospace chairman Richard Evans and DASA CEO Jürgen Schrempp.

Meanwhile, GEC was also under pressure to participate in defence industry consolidation. Reporting the appointment of George Simpson as GEC managing director in 1996, The Independent said "some analysts believe that Mr Simpson's inside knowledge of BAe, a long-rumoured GEC bid target, was a key to his appointment. GEC favours forging a national 'champion' defence group with BAe to compete with the giant US organisations." When GEC put MES up for sale on 22 December 1998, British Aerospace abandoned the DASA merger in favour of purchasing its British rival. The merger of British Aerospace and MES was announced on 19 January 1999. Evans stated in 2004 that his fear was that an American defence contractor would acquire MES and challenge both British Aerospace and DASA. The merger created a vertically integrated company which The Scotsman described as "[a combination of British Aerospace's] contracting and platform-building skills with Marconi's coveted electronics systems capability", for example combining the manufacturer of the Eurofighter with the company that provided many of the aircraft's electronic systems; British Aerospace was MES's biggest customer. In contrast, DASA's response to the breakdown of the merger discussion was to merge with Aérospatiale to create the European Aeronautic Defence and Space Company (EADS), a horizontal integration.

Seventeen undertakings were given by BAE Systems to the Department of Trade and Industry which prevented a reference of the merger to the Monopolies and Mergers Commission. These were largely to ensure that the integrated company would tender sub-contracts to external companies on an equal basis with its subsidiaries. Another condition was the "firewalling" of former British Aerospace and MES teams on defence projects such as the Joint Strike Fighter (JSF). In 2007 the government announced that it had agreed to release BAE Systems from ten of the undertakings due to "a change in circumstances".

BAE Systems inherited the UK government-owned "golden" share that was established when British Aerospace was privatised. This unique share prevents amendments of certain parts of the company's Articles of Association without the permission of the Secretary of State. These Articles require that no foreign person or persons acting together may hold more than 15% of the company's shares.

=== 2000s ===
BAE Systems' first annual report identified Airbus, support services to militaries and integrated systems for air, land and naval applications as key areas of growth. It also stated the company's desire to both expand in the US and participate in further consolidation in Europe. BAE Systems described 2001 as an "important year" for its European joint ventures, which were reorganised considerably. The company has described the rationale for expansion in the US; "[it] is by far the largest defence market with spend running close to twice that of the Western European nations combined. Importantly, US investment in research and development is significantly higher than in Western Europe." When Dick Olver was appointed chairman in July 2004, he ordered a review of the company's businesses which ruled out further European acquisitions or joint ventures and confirmed a "strategic bias" for expansion and investment in the US. The review also confirmed the attractiveness of the land systems sector and, with two acquisitions in 2004 and 2005, BAE moved from a limited land systems supplier to the second largest such company in the world. This shift in strategy was described as "remarkable" by the Financial Times. Between 2008 and early 2011, BAE acquired five cybersecurity companies in a shift in strategy to take account of reduced spending by governments on "traditional defence items such as warships and tanks". By 1 February 2011, the company had more than 6,500 cyber jobs across 10 countries.

In 2000, Matra Marconi Space, a joint BAE Systems/Matra company, was merged with the space division of DASA to form Astrium. On 16 June 2003, BAE sold its 25% share of Astrium for £84 million; however, due to the lossmaking status of the company, BAE Systems invested an equal amount for "restructuring". BAE Systems sold its 54% majority share of BAE Systems Canada, an electronics company, in April for CA$310 (approximately £197 million as of December 2010). In November 2001, the company announced the closure of the Avro Regional Jet (Avro RJ) production line at Woodford and the cancellation of the Avro RJX, an advanced series of the aircraft family, as the business was "no longer viable". The final Avro RJ to be completed became the last British civil airliner. In November 2001, BAE sold its 49.9% share of Thomson Marconi Sonar to Thales for £85 million. A further step of European defence consolidation was the merger of BAE's share of Matra BAe Dynamics and the missile division of Alenia Marconi Systems (AMS) into MBDA in December. MBDA thus became the world's second largest missile manufacturer. Although EADS (now Airbus) was later reported to be interested in acquiring full control of MBDA, BAE said that, unlike Airbus, MBDA is a "core business".

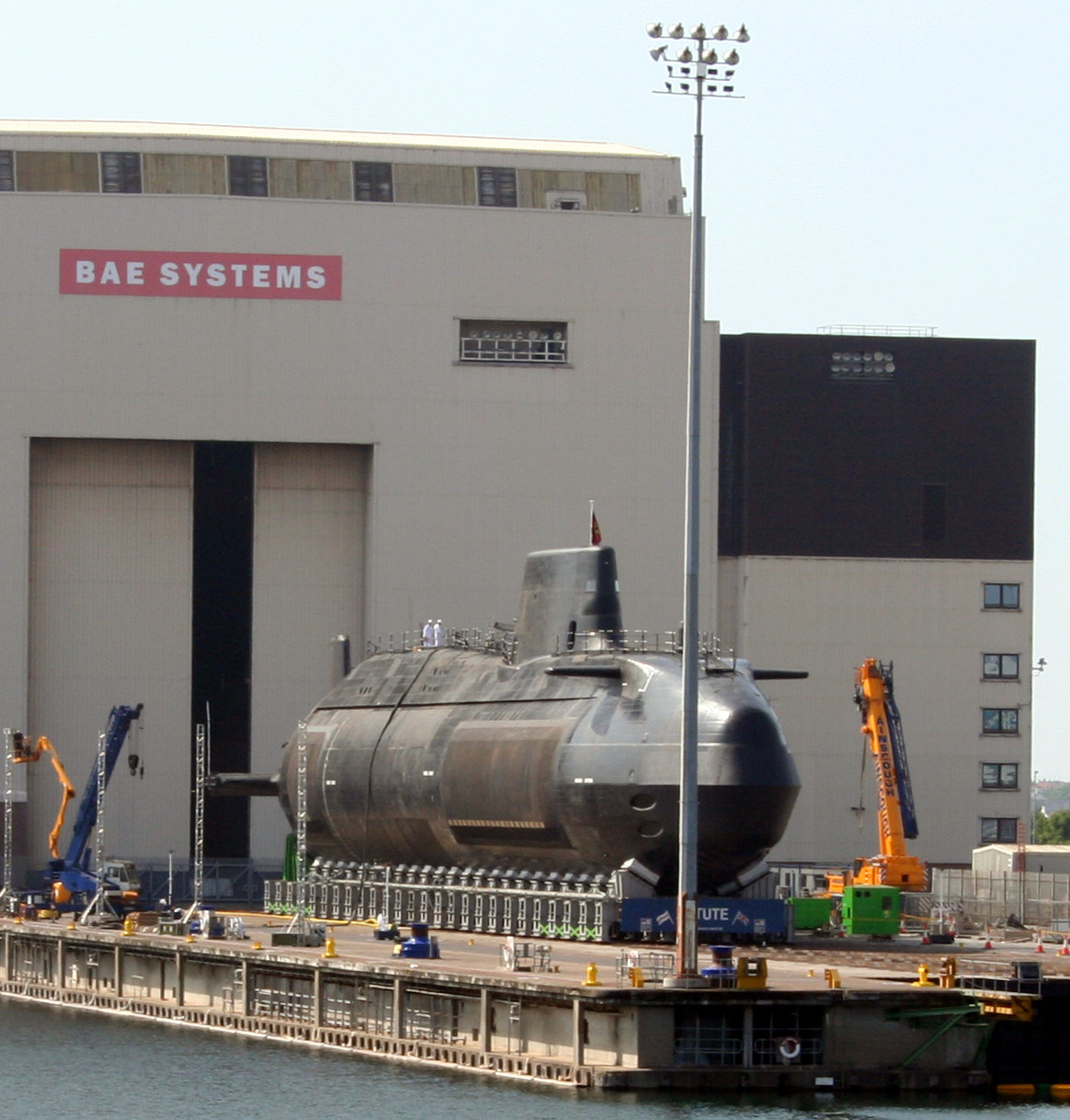
The Astute-class submarine project caused BAE to issue a profit warning in 2002 and invest £250 million to overcome its difficulties.

In June 2002, BAE Systems confirmed it was in takeover discussions with TRW, an American aerospace, automotive and defence business. This was prompted by Northrop Grumman's £4.1 billion (approximately US$6 billion in 2002) hostile bid for TRW in February 2002. A bidding war between BAE Systems, Northrop and General Dynamics ended on 1 June when Northrop's increased bid of £5.1 billion was accepted. On 11 December 2002, BAE Systems issued a shock profit warning due to cost overruns of the Nimrod MRA4 maritime reconnaissance/attack aircraft and the Astute-class submarine projects. On 19 February 2003, BAE took a charge of £750 million against these projects and the Ministry of Defence (MoD) agreed to pay a further £700 million of the cost. In 2000, the company had taken a £300 million "loss charge" on the Nimrod contract which was expected to cover "all the costs of completion of the current contract". The troubled Nimrod project would ultimately be cancelled as part of the 2010 Strategic Defence and Security Review (SDSR).

The UK government, following a cabinet row described as "one of the most bitter Cabinet disputes over defence contracts since the Westland helicopter affair in 1985", ordered 20 BAE Hawk trainer aircraft with 24 options in July 2003 in a deal worth £800 million. The deal was significant because it was a factor in India's decision to finalise a £1 billion order for 66 Hawks in March 2004. Also in July 2003, BAE Systems and Finmeccanica announced their intention to set up three joint venture companies, to be collectively known as Eurosystems. These companies would have pooled the avionics, C4ISTAR and communications businesses of the two companies. However, the difficulties of integrating the companies in this way led to a re-evaluation of the proposal; BAE Systems' 2004 Annual Report states that "recognising the complexity of the earlier proposed Eurosystems transaction with Finmeccanica we have moved to a simpler model". The main part of this deal was the dissolution of AMS and the establishment of SELEX Sensors and Airborne Systems; BAE Systems sold its 25% share of the latter to Finmeccanica for €400 million (approximately £270 million c. 2007) in March 2007.

In May 2004, it was reported that the company was considering selling its shipbuilding divisions, BAE Systems Naval Ships and BAE Systems Submarines. It was understood that General Dynamics wished to acquire the submarine building facilities at Barrow-in-Furness, while VT Group was said to be interested in the remaining yards on the Clyde. Instead, in 2008, BAE Systems merged its Surface Fleet arm with the shipbuilding operations of VT Group to form BVT Surface Fleet, an aim central to the British Government's 2005 Defence Industrial Strategy.

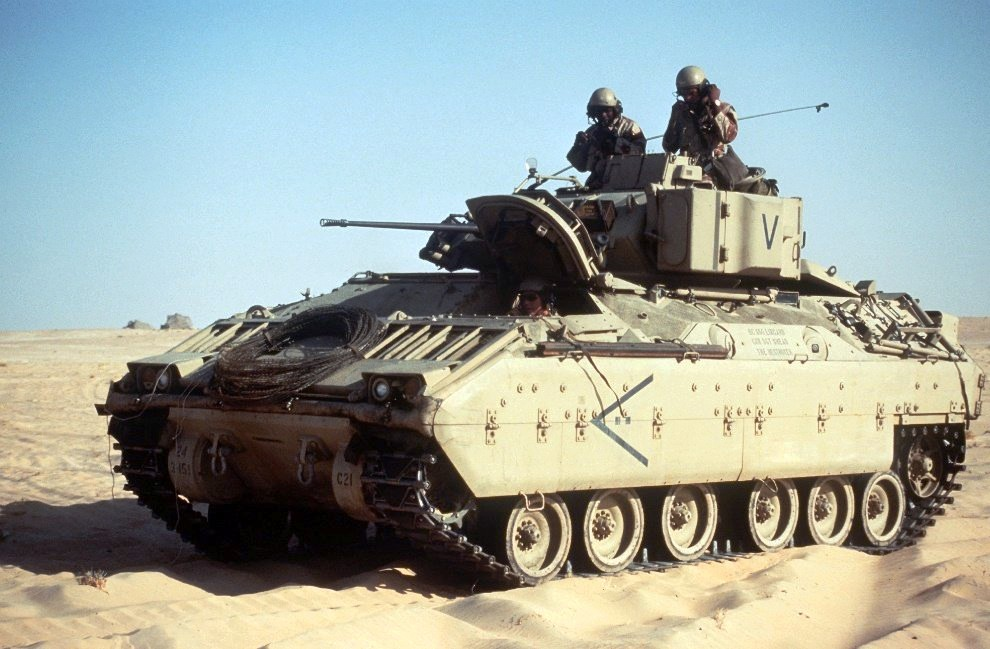
BAE's £2.5 billion purchase of United Defense in 2005 added the M2/M3 Bradley family of armoured vehicles to its product line.

On 4 June 2004, BAE Systems outbid General Dynamics for Alvis Vickers, the UK's main manufacturer of armoured vehicles. Alvis Vickers was merged with the company's RO Defence unit to form BAE Systems Land Systems. Recognising the lack of scale of this business compared to General Dynamics, BAE Systems executives soon identified the US defence company United Defense Industries (UDI), a major competitor to General Dynamics, as a main acquisition target. On 7 March 2005, BAE announced the £2.25 billion (approximately US$4.2 billion c. 2005) acquisition of UDI. UDI, now BAE Systems Land and Armaments, manufactures combat vehicles, artillery systems, naval guns, missile launchers and precision guided munitions.

In December 2005, BAE Systems announced the sale of its German naval systems subsidiary, Atlas Elektronik, to ThyssenKrupp and EADS. The Financial Times described the sale as "cut price" because French company Thales bid €300 million, but was blocked from purchasing Atlas by the German government on national security grounds. On 31 January 2006 the company announced the sale of BAE Systems Aerostructures to Spirit AeroSystems, Inc., having said as early as 2002 that it wished to dispose of what it did not regard as a "core business".

On 18 August 2006, Saudi Arabia signed a contract worth £6 billion to £10 billion for 72 Eurofighter Typhoons, to be delivered by BAE Systems. On 10 September 2006, the company was awarded a £2.5 billion contract for the upgrade of 80 Royal Saudi Air Force Tornado IDSs. One of BAE Systems' major aims, as highlighted in the 2005 Annual Report, was the granting of increased technology transfer between the UK and the US. The F-35 (JSF) programme became the focus of this effort, with British government ministers such as Lord Drayson, Minister for Defence Procurement, suggesting the UK would withdraw from the project without the transfer of technology that would allow the UK to operate and maintain F-35s independently. On 12 December 2006, Lord Drayson signed an agreement which allows "an unbroken British chain of command" for operation of the aircraft. On 22 December 2006 BAE received a £947 million contract to provide guaranteed availability of Royal Air Force (RAF) Tornados.

In May 2007, the company announced its subsidiary BAE Systems Inc. was to purchase Armor Holdings for £2.3 billion (approximately US$4.5 billion c. 2007) and completed the deal on 31 July 2007. The company was a manufacturer of tactical wheeled vehicles and a provider of vehicle and individual armour systems and survivability technologies. BAE Systems (and British Aerospace previously) was a technology partner to the McLaren Formula One team from 1996 to December 2007. The partnership originally focused on McLaren's F1 car's aerodynamics, eventually moving on to carbon fibre techniques, wireless systems and fuel management. BAE Systems' main interest in the partnership was to learn about the high speed build and operations processes of McLaren.

The company announced the acquisition of Tenix Defence, a major Australian defence contractor in January 2008. The purchase was completed on 27 June for A$775 million (£373 million) making BAE Systems Australia that country's largest defence contractor. The MoD awarded BAE Systems a 15-year munitions contract in August 2008 worth up to £3 billion, known as Munition Acquisition Supply Solution (MASS). The contract guaranteed supply of 80% of the UK Armed Forces' ammunition and required BAE to modernise its munitions manufacturing facilities. BAE Systems expanded its intelligence and security business with the £531 million purchase of Detica Group in July 2008. It continued this strategy with purchases of Danish cyber and intelligence company ETI for approximately $210 million in December 2010, and Norkom Group PLC the following month for €217 million. The latter provides counter fraud and anti-money laundering solutions to the global financial services industry where its software assists institutions to comply with regulations on financial intelligence and monitoring.

==== Airbus shareholding ====
BAE Systems inherited British Aerospace's share of Airbus Industrie, which consisted of two factories at Broughton and Filton. These facilities manufactured wings for the Airbus family of aircraft. In 2001 Airbus was incorporated as Airbus SAS, a joint stock company. In return for a 20% share in the new company BAE Systems transferred ownership of its Airbus plants (known as Airbus UK) to the new company.

Despite repeated suggestions as early as 2000 that BAE Systems wished to sell its 20% share of Airbus, the possibility was denied by the company. However, on 6 April 2006 it was reported that it was indeed to sell its stake, then "conservatively valued" at £2.4 billion. Due to the slow pace of informal negotiations, BAE Systems exercised its put option which saw investment bank Rothschild appointed to give an independent valuation. Six days after this process began, Airbus announced delays to the A380 with significant effects on the value of Airbus shares. On 2 June 2006 Rothschild valued the company's share at £1.87 billion, well below its own analysts' and even EADS's expectations. The BAE Systems board recommended that the company proceed with the sale. Shareholders voted in favour and the sale was completed on 13 October. This saw the end of UK-owned involvement in civil airliner production. Airbus Operations Ltd (the former Airbus UK) continued to be the Airbus "Centre of Excellence" for wing production, employing over 9,500 in 2007.

=== 2010s ===
In February 2010, BAE Systems announced a £592 million writedown of the former Armor Holdings business following the loss of the Family of Medium Tactical Vehicles contract in 2009. It was outbid by Oshkosh Corporation for the £2.3 billion ($3.7 billion) contract. Land and Armaments had been the "star performer" of BAE Systems' subsidiaries, growing from sales of £482 million in 2004 to £6.7 billion in 2009.

BAE Systems inherited British Aerospace's 35% share of Saab AB, with which it produced and marketed the Gripen fighter aircraft. In 2005 it reduced this share to 20.5% and in March 2010 announced its intention to sell the remainder. The Times stated that the decision brought "to an end its controversial relationship with the Gripen fighter aircraft". Several of the export campaigns for the aircraft were subject to allegations of bribery and corruption.

The company continued its move into support services in May 2010 with the purchase of the marine support company Atlantic Marine for $352 million. In September 2010, BAE Systems announced plans to sell the Platform Solutions division of BAE Systems Inc., which the Financial Times estimated could yield as much as £1.3 billion. Despite "considerable expressions of interest", the sale was abandoned in January 2011. The purchases of Queen Elizabeth-class aircraft carriers, the Astute-class submarines, and the Type 26 frigates were all confirmed in the 2010 SDSR. A new generation of nuclear missile submarines, the Dreadnought class, was ordered in 2016.

BAE Systems sold the regional aircraft leasing and asset management arm of its Regional Aircraft business in May 2011. This unit leases the BAe 146/Avro RJ family, BAe ATP, Jetstream and BAe 748. The company retained the support and engineering activities of the business. In September 2011, BAE Systems began consultation with unions and workers over plans to cut nearly 3,000 jobs, mostly in the company's military aircraft division.

In its 2012 half-year report, the company revealed a 10% decline in revenue in the six months up to 30 June due to falling demand for armaments. In May 2012 the governments of the UK and Saudi Arabia reached an agreement on an arms package which saw a £1.6 billion contract awarded to BAE for the delivery of 55 Pilatus PC-21 and 22 BAE Systems Hawk aircraft. The Sultanate of Oman ordered Typhoon and Hawk aircraft worth £2.5 billion in December 2012.

In September 2012, it was reported that BAE Systems and EADS had entered merger talks which would have seen BAE shareholders own 40% of the resulting organisation. On 10 October 2012, the companies said the merger talks had been called off. The Guardian reported that this was due to the German Government's concern about the "potential size of the French shareholding in the combined company, as well as disagreements over the location of the group's headquarters".

In November 2013, BAE Systems announced that shipbuilding would cease in Portsmouth in 2014 with the loss of 940 jobs, and a further 835 jobs would be lost at Filton, near Bristol, and at the shipyards in Govan, Rosyth, and Scotstoun in Scotland. On 9 October 2014, the company announced the loss of 440 management jobs across the country, with 286 of the job cuts in Lancashire.

In July 2014, it announced the acquisition of US intelligence company Signal Innovations Group Inc. to augment imagery and data analysis technologies in its Intelligence & Security business. In August 2014, BAE was awarded a £248 million contract from the British government to build three new offshore patrol vessels. In October 2014, BAE Systems won a £600 million contract from the MoD to maintain Portsmouth naval base for five years. During 2014, BAE Systems acquired US-based cybersecurity firm Silversky for $232.5 million.

During Prime Minister Theresa May's visit to Turkey in January 2017, BAE and TAI officials signed an agreement, worth about £100 million, for BAE to provide assistance in developing the TAI TF Kaan aircraft. On 10 October 2017, BAE announced that it would lay off nearly 2,000 out of its approximately 35,000 employees in Britain, mainly due to an order shortage for the Typhoon fighter.

In 2018, the company agreed a £5 billion with the government of Qatar for 24 Typhoon Eurofighters.

In 2019, BAE Systems sold a 55% share of its UK land business to Rheinmetall. The resultant joint venture (JV), Rheinmetall BAE Systems Land (RBSL), was established in July 2019 following regulatory approval and is headquartered at the existing facility in Telford, Shropshire.

=== 2020s ===
In August 2020, BAE Systems completed the purchase of United Technologies' military GPS businesses for $1.9 billion and Raytheon's military airborne radios business for $275 million. The sale of these two business was a condition of the merger approval that saw their two parent companies merge to form Raytheon Technologies.

In November 2020, the MoD announced the award of a 20-year, £2.4 billion munitions contract to BAE. This will see BAE manufacture 39 different munitions for the UK armed forces and supersedes the 2008 MASS contract. In July 2023, BAE received a related £280 million order to address a munitions shortage caused by the supply of ammunition to Ukraine.

In 2022, during the Russian invasion of Ukraine, major arms manufacturers, including BAE Systems, reported a sharp increase in interim sales and profits.

In December 2022, it was announced that the United Kingdom, Italy and Japan were launching a new trilateral collaboration in the form of the Global Combat Air Program or GCAP, and that BAE Systems would be joining Leonardo and Mitsubishi Heavy Industries as the three prime industrial partners for the initiative. The GCAP would develop a new sixth-generation, AI- and stealth-enabled combat aircraft that would reduce dependency on US military aircraft technology.

In 2024, this was formalised as BAE Systems, Leonardo and the Japan Aircraft Industrial Enhancement Co (JAIEC), which is partly funded by Mitsubishi Heavy Industries agreed to establish a joint venture company, with each holding a 33.3 per cent share in the new group, giving them an equal degree of influence over the project. In June 2026, the UK government announced that as part of the Defence Investment Plan it would commit an additional £8.6 billion in funding to GCAP over a four year period.

In August 2023, BAE agreed to acquire the aerospace division of US-based Ball Corporation for $5.6 billion in cash (approximately £4.5 billion); this was BAE's largest acquisition up until that point and was completed on 16 February 2024. In October 2023, BAE was awarded a £3.95 billion contract for development work on Aukus-class submarines up to 2028.

In October 2025, the company acquired a 96-acre (39 ha) manufacturing site in Ulverston, Cumbria from Sandoz, a pharmaceuticals company that bought the land from GSK plc in 2021. The company has yet to announce its plans for the site post acquisition.

== Products ==
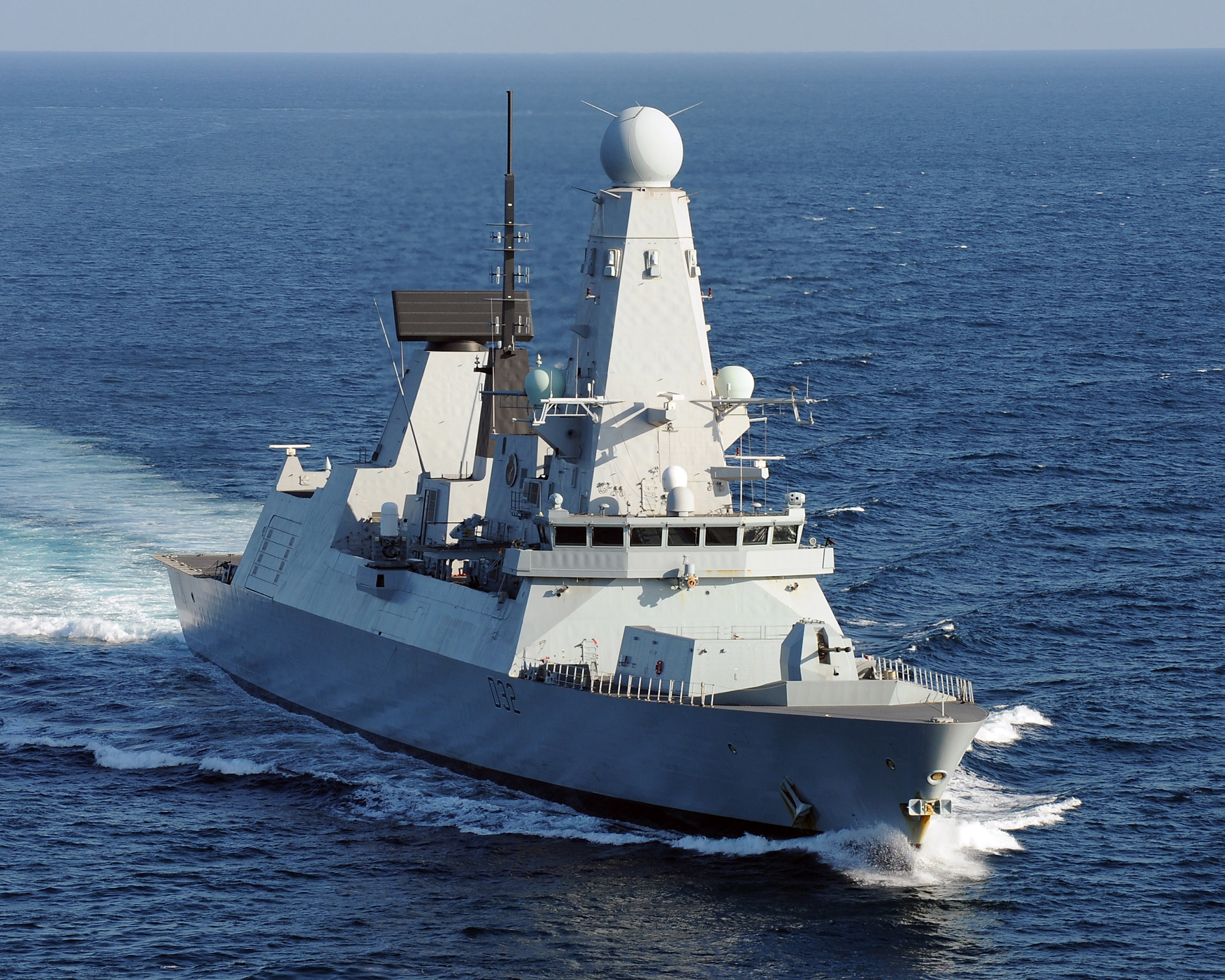
BAE Systems Maritime – Naval Ships built the Type 45 destroyer. Other subsidiaries of BAE supplied the naval gun and SAMPSON and S1850M radars for the class.

BAE Systems is one of the largest arms producers in the world. In 2024, its revenues from arms sales were around $33.8 billion, representing 95% of BAE Systems' total revenues.

The company's Typhoon fighter is one of the main front line aircraft of the RAF. The company is a major partner in the Lockheed Martin F-35 Lightning II programme and part of the international supply chain for the aircraft. In 2025, reporting on a High Court challenge to the UK government’s export licensing policy stated that the United Kingdom supplies around 15 per cent of the value of each F-35 aircraft, mainly through BAE Systems, and that the government maintained an exemption for F-35 components when it suspended some arms export licences relating to Israel in 2024. In June 2025, a High Court ruling found that the government’s decision to allow continued exports of F-35 components was lawful, with the judges stating that the matter was one for the executive and Parliament rather than the courts. Its Hawk advanced jet trainer aircraft has been widely exported. In July 2006, the British government declassified the HERTI (High Endurance Rapid Technology Insertion), an Unmanned Aerial Vehicle (UAV) which can navigate autonomously. It is currently developing a sixth-generation jet fighter aircraft for the RAF marketed as the "Tempest" along with the MoD, Rolls-Royce, Leonardo and MBDA. It is intended to enter service from 2035 replacing the Typhoon aircraft in service with the RAF.

BAE Systems Land and Armaments manufactures the M2/M3 Bradley fighting vehicle family, the US Navy Advanced Gun System (AGS), M113 armoured personnel carrier (APC), M109 Paladin, Archer, M777 howitzer, the British Army's Challenger 2, Warrior Tracked Armoured Vehicle, Panther Command and Liaison Vehicle, and the SA80 assault rifle.

Major naval projects include the Astute-class submarines, Type 26 frigates and Dreadnought-class submarines.

BAE Systems is indirectly engaged in production of nuclear weapons—through its share of MBDA it is involved with the production and support of the ASMP missile, an air-launched nuclear missile which forms part of the French nuclear deterrent. The company is also the UK's only nuclear submarine manufacturer and thus produces a key element of the United Kingdom's nuclear weapons capability.

BAE has operated the Holston Army Ammunition Plant in Tennessee, since 1999, and the Radford Army Ammunition Plant in Radford, Virginia since 2012.

== Areas of business ==
BAE Systems' biggest markets are the US 44%, UK 20%, Saudi Arabia 11% and Australia 4%, as of 2022.

=== United Kingdom ===
BAE Systems is the main supplier to the UK MoD; in 2009/2010 BAE Systems companies in the list of Top 100 suppliers to the MoD received contracts totalling £3.98 billion, with total revenue being higher when other subsidiary income is included. In comparison, the second largest supplier is Babcock International Group and its subsidiaries, with a revenue of £1.1 billion from the MoD. Oxford Economic Forecasting states that in 2002 the company's UK businesses employed 111,578 people, achieved export sales of £3 billion and paid £2.6 billion in taxes. These figures exclude the contribution of Airbus UK.

After its creation, BAE Systems had a difficult relationship with the MoD. This was attributed to deficient project management by the company, but also in part to the deficiencies in the terms of "fixed price contracts". CEO Mike Turner said in 2006 "We had entered into contracts under the old competition rules that frankly we shouldn't have taken". These competition rules were introduced by Lord Levene during the 1980s to shift the burden of risk to the contractor and were in contrast to "cost plus contracts" where a contractor was paid for the value of its product plus an agreed profit.

BAE Systems was operating in "the only truly open defence market", which meant it was competing with US and European companies for British defence projects, while they were protected in their home markets. The US defence market is competitive; however, largely between American firms, while foreign companies are excluded. In December 2005 the MoD published the Defence Industrial Strategy (DIS) which has been widely acknowledged to recognise BAE Systems as the UK's "national champion". The government claimed the DIS would "promote a sustainable industrial base, that retains in the UK those industrial capabilities needed to ensure national security."

After the publication of the DIS BAE Systems CEO Mike Turner said "If we didn't have the DIS and our profitability and the terms of trade had stayed as they were... then there had to be a question mark about our future in the UK". Lord Levene said in the balance between value for money or maintaining a viable industrial base the DIS "tries as well as it can to steer a middle course and to achieve as much as it can in both directions. ...We will never have a perfect solution."

BAE Systems have locations across the UK in Cowes, Samlesbury, Warton, Barrow-In-Furness, Glascoed, Dorchester, Filton, Bristol, Gloucester, Christchurch, Yeovil, Govan, Scotstoun, Brough, Humberside, Towcester, Leeds, Alton, Frimley, Guildford, Rochester, Stirling Square, Broad Oak and Portsmouth.

=== United States ===
The attraction of MES to British Aerospace was largely its ownership of Tracor, a major American defence contractor.

BAE Systems Inc. now sells more to the US Department of Defense (DOD) than to the UK MoD. The company has been allowed to buy important defence contractors in the US; however, its status as a UK company requires that its US subsidiaries are governed by American executives under Special Security Arrangements. The company faces fewer impediments in this sense than its European counterparts, as there is a high degree of integration between the US and UK defence establishments. BAE Systems' purchase of Lockheed Martin Aerospace Electronic Systems in November 2000 was described by John Hamre, CEO of the Center for Strategic and International Studies and former Deputy Secretary of Defense, as "precedent setting" given the advanced and classified nature of many of that company's products.

The possibility of a merger between BAE Systems Inc. and major North American defence contractors has long been reported, including Boeing, General Dynamics, Lockheed Martin, and Raytheon.

=== Rest of the world ===
BAE Systems Australia is one of the largest defence contractors in Australia, having more than doubled in size with the acquisition of Tenix Defence in 2008.

The Al Yamamah agreements between the UK and Saudi Arabia require "the provision of a complete defence package for the Kingdom of Saudi Arabia". As of March 2022, BAE Systems employs over 7,000 people in Saudi Arabia and 75 per cent of the employees are Saudi nationals. BAE Systems' interests in Sweden are a result of the purchases of Alvis Vickers and UDI, which owned Hägglunds and Bofors, respectively; the companies are now part of BAE Systems AB.

On 6 April 2022, BAE Systems announced the establishment of BAE Systems Japan, a subsidiary located in Akasaka, Tokyo, Japan. The new company will provide comprehensive cooperation with Japanese industry and aims to strengthen relations with the Japanese Ministry of Defense and the Japan Self-Defense Forces.

In late August 2023, BAE Systems announced that it had opened an office in Ukraine, and had signed an agreement for cooperation on the repair, spare parts, and production of L119 howitzers within Ukraine.

On 4 January 2024, BAE Systems announced an initial agreement, potentially worth up to $50 million, to resume production of titanium structures for the M777 howitzer for the US Army, with the first deliveries expected in 2025.

== Shareholders ==
BAE Systems' 2022 Annual Report listed the following as "significant" shareholders: Barclays 3.98%, BlackRock 9.90%, Capital Group Companies 14.18%, Invesco 4.97% and Silchester International Investors 3.01%.

== Organisation ==
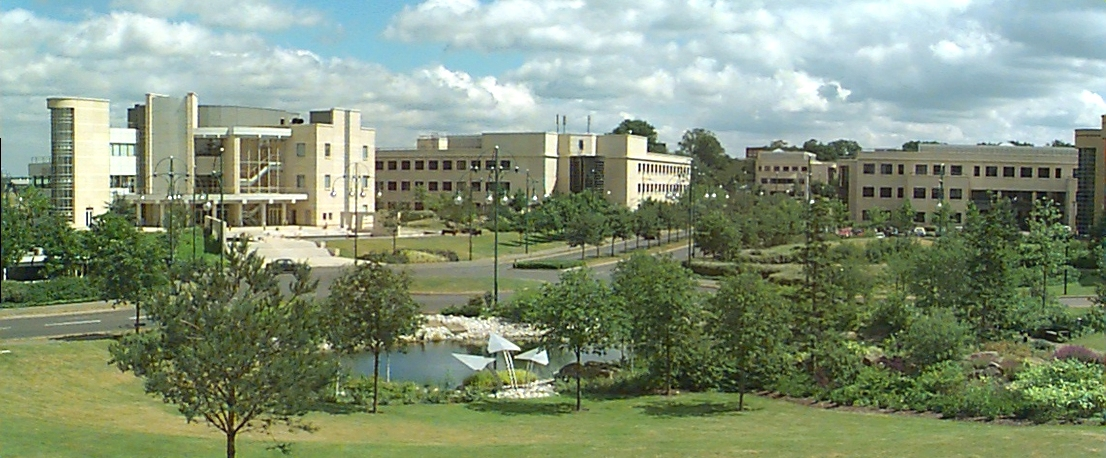
BAE Systems has offices in the Farnborough Aerospace Centre business park. Senior managers are based at the registered office in Carlton Gardens, City of Westminster.

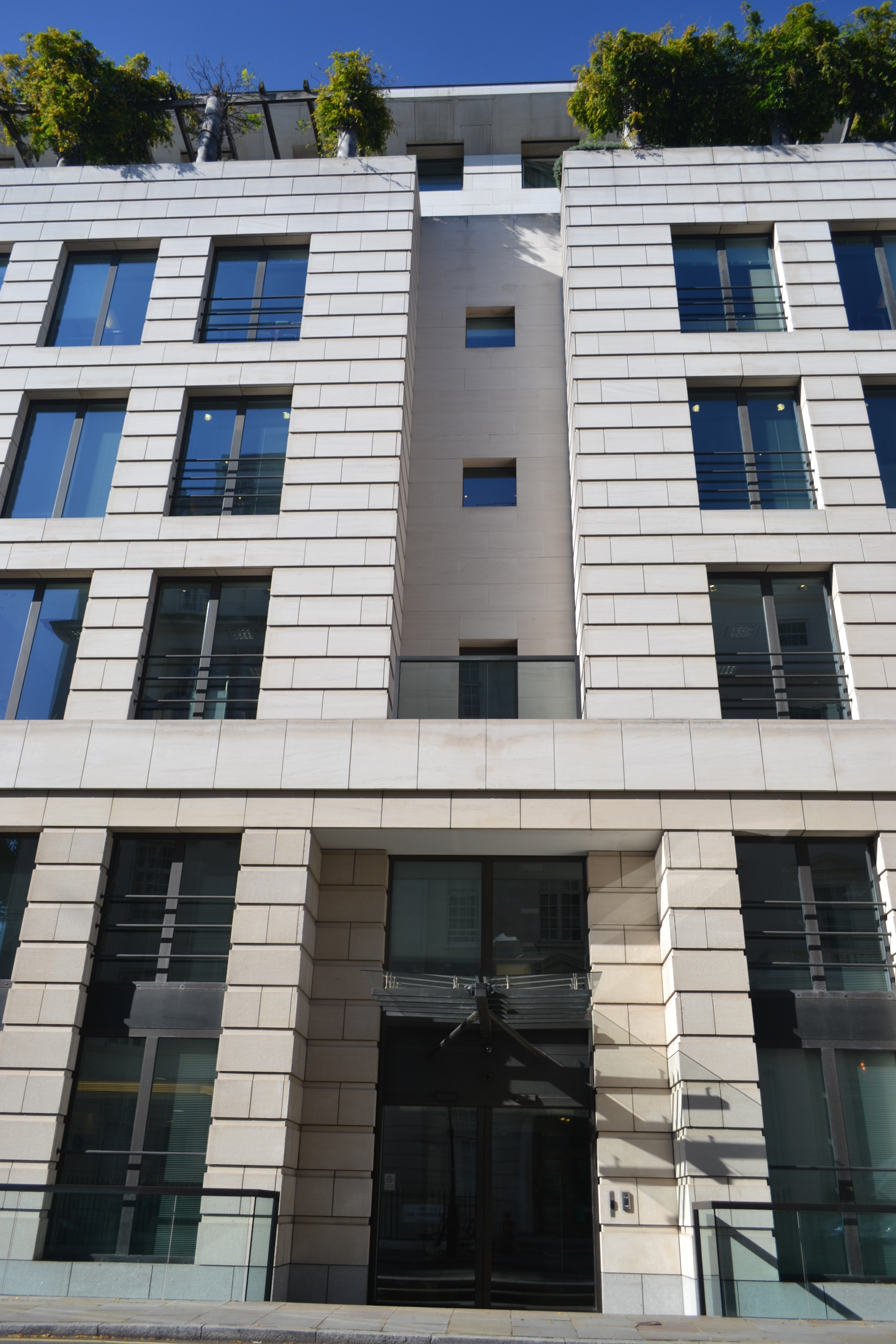
6 Carlton Gardens, London

BAE Systems has its head office and its registered office in City of Westminster, London. In addition to its central London offices, it has an office in Farnborough, Hampshire, that houses functional specialists and support functions.

== Corporate governance ==
BAE Systems' Chair is Cressida Hogg. As of July 2025, the executive directors are Charles Woodburn (CEO), Brad Greve and Tom Arsenault. The non-executive directors are Crystal E. Ashby, Elizabeth Corley, Angus Cockburn, Ewan Kirk, Ian Tyler, Nicole Piasecki, Stephen Pearce, Jane Griffiths and Nick Anderson.

The company's first CEO, John Weston, was forced to resign in 2002 in a boardroom "coup" and was replaced by Mike Turner. The Business reported that Weston was ousted when non-executive directors informed the chairman that they had lost confidence in him. Further, it was suggested that at least one non-executive director was encouraged to make such a move by the MoD due to the increasingly fractious relationship between BAE Systems and the government. As well as the terms of the Nimrod contract, Weston had fought against the MOD's insistence that one of the first three Type 45 destroyers should be built by VT Group. The Business said he considered this "competition-policy gone mad".

It is understood that Turner had a poor working relationship with senior MoD officials, for example with former Defence Secretary Geoff Hoon. The first meeting between Hoon and BAE's new chairman Dick Olver in 2004 was said to have gone well; a MoD official commented "He is a man we can do business with". It has been suggested that relations between Turner and Olver were tense. On 16 October 2007, the company announced that Mike Turner would retire in August 2008. The Times called his departure plans "abrupt" and a "shock", given previous statements that he wished to retire in 2013 at the age of 65. Despite suggestions that BAE Systems would prefer an American CEO due to the increasing importance of the United States defence market to the company and the opportunity to make a clean break from corruption allegations and investigations related to the Al-Yamamah contracts, the company announced on 27 June 2008, that it had selected the company's chief operating officer, Ian King, to succeed Turner with effect from 1 September 2008. The Financial Times noted that King's career at Marconi distances him from the British Aerospace-led Al Yamamah project.

Charles Woodburn succeeded Ian King as CEO on 1 July 2017. Woodburn joined BAE Systems in May 2016 as chief operating officer and executive board director following over 20 years' international experience in senior management positions in the oil and gas industry.

=== Senior leadership ===
- Chair: Cressida Hogg (since 2023)
- Chief executive: Charles Woodburn (since 2017)

List of former chairmen

1. Sir Richard Evans (1999–2004)
2. Sir Dick Olver (2004–2014)
3. Sir Roger Carr (2014–2023)

List of former chief executives

1. John Weston (1999–2002)
2. Michael Turner (2002–2008)
3. Ian King (2008–2017)

== Financial information ==
Financial information for the company is as follows:

BAE Systems financial information
Year ended	Turnover (£ million)	Profit/(loss) before tax (£M)	Net profit/(loss) (£M)	EPS (p)
31 December 2025	28,336	2,572	2,151	68.8
31 December 2024	26,312	2,332	2,041	64.9
31 December 2023	23,078	2,326	1,940	61.3
31 December 2022	21,258	1,989	1,674	51.1
31 December 2021	19,521	2,110	1,912	55.2
31 December 2020	19,277	1,596	1,371	40.7
31 December 2019	18,305	1,626	1,532	46.4
31 December 2018	16,821	1,224	1,033	31.3
31 December 2017	18,322	1,134	884	26.8
31 December 2016	17,790	1,151	938	28.8
31 December 2015	17,904	1,090	943	29.0
31 December 2014	16,637	882	752	23.4
31 December 2013	18,180	422	176	5.2
31 December 2012	17,834	1,369	1,079	33.0
31 December 2011	19,154	1,466	1,256	36.9
31 December 2010	22,392	1,444	1,081	30.5
31 December 2009	22,415	282	(45)	(1.9)
31 December 2008	18,543	2,371	1,768	49.6
31 December 2007	15,710	1,477	1,177	26.0
31 December 2006	13,765	1,207	1,054	19.9
31 December 2005 (Note: Restated to exclude Airbus contributions. Included for comparison.)	12,581	909	761	13.9
31 December 2005	15,411	845	555	22.5
31 December 2004	13,222	730	3	17.4
31 December 2003 (Note: Data prepared using UK GAAP guidelines. Recent data prepared using International Financial Reporting Standards.)	15,572	233	8	16.6
31 December 2002	12,145	(616)	(686) (Note: Reflects £750 million charges for problems with Nimrod MRA4 (£500 million) and Astute-class submarine (£250 million) programmes.)	17.3
31 December 2001	13,138	70	(128)	23.4
31 December 2000	12,185	179	(19)	18.8
31 December 1999	8,929	459	328	29.4

== Corruption investigations ==
=== Serious Fraud Office ===
BAE Systems has been investigated by the Serious Fraud Office (SFO) for the use of corruption to help sell arms to Chile, Czech Republic, Romania, Saudi Arabia, South Africa, Tanzania and Qatar. In response, BAE Systems' 2006 Corporate Responsibility Report states "We continue to reject these allegations... We take our obligations under the law extremely seriously and will continue to comply with all legal requirements around the world. In June 2007 Lord Woolf was selected to lead what the BBC described as an "independent review.... [an] ethics committee to look into how the defence giant conducts its arms deals". The report, Ethical business conduct in BAE Systems plc – the way forward, made 23 recommendations, measures which the company committed to implement. The finding stated that "in the past BAE did not pay sufficient attention to ethical standards in the way it conducted business", and was described by the BBC as "an embarrassing admission".

In September 2009, the SFO announced that it intended to prosecute BAE Systems for offences relating to overseas corruption. The Guardian claimed that a penalty more than £500 million might be an acceptable settlement package. On 5 February 2010, BAE Systems agreed to pay criminal fines of £257 million (US$400 million) to the US and £30 million to the UK. The $400 million fine was a result of a plea bargain with the US Department of Justice (DOJ) whereby BAE Systems was convicted of felony conspiracy to defraud the United States government. This was one of the largest fines in the history of the DOJ. Judge Bates said the company's conduct involved "deception, duplicity and knowing violations of law, I think it's fair to say, on an enormous scale". BAE Systems did not directly admit to bribery, and is thus not internationally blacklisted from future contracts. Some of the £30 million penalty the company will pay in fines to the UK will be paid ex gratia for the benefit of the people of Tanzania. On 2 March 2010, Campaign Against Arms Trade (CAAT) and Corner House Research were successful in gaining a High Court injunction on the SFO's settlement with BAE Systems; however, in April 2010 the two organisations withdrew their application for a judicial review.

=== Saudi Arabia ===
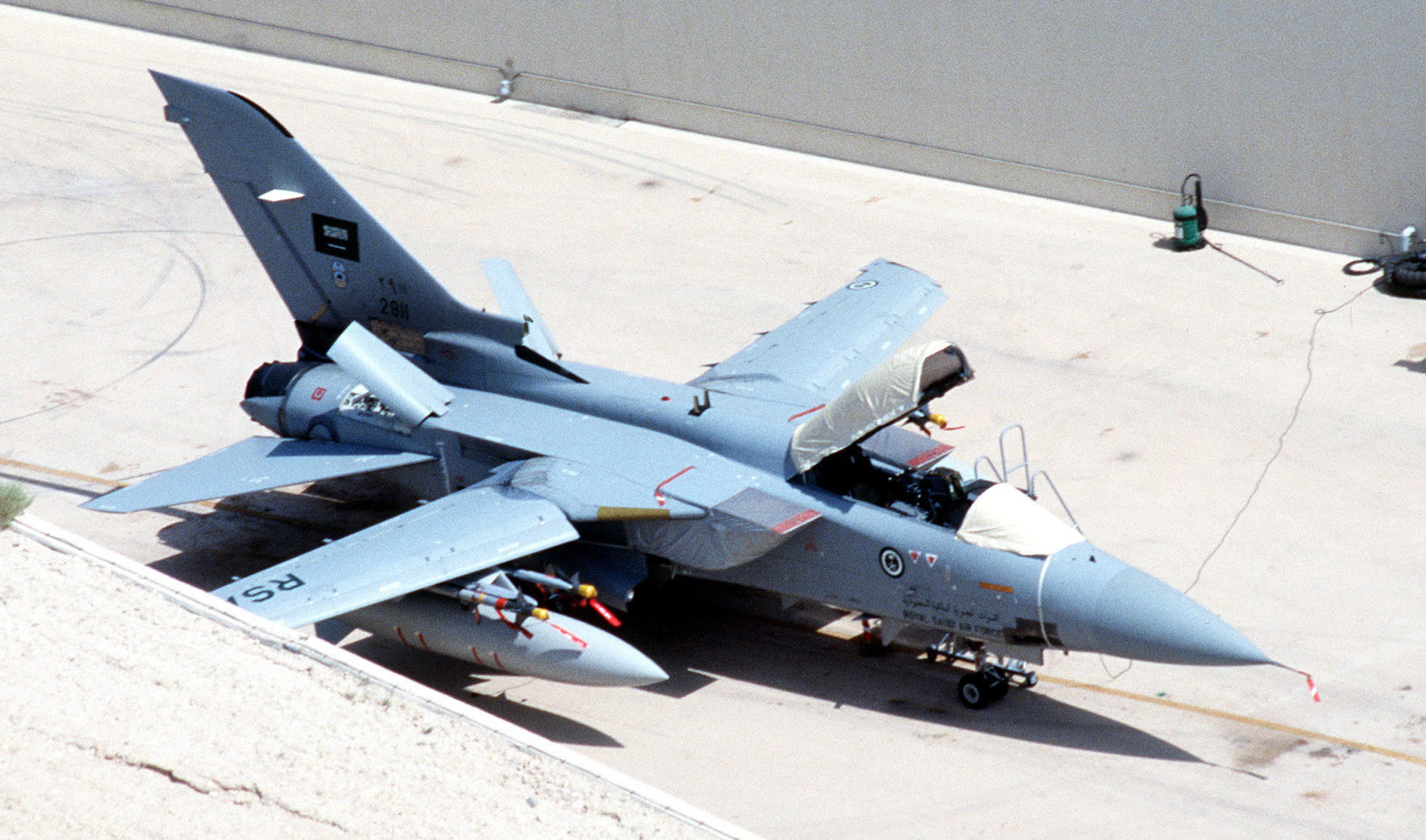
One of 24 Panavia Tornado ADVs delivered to the Royal Saudi Air Force as part of the Al-Yamamah arms sales

Both BAE Systems and its predecessor (BAe) have long been the subject of allegations of bribery in relation to its business in Saudi Arabia. In 1985, the British government signed a multi-billion pound arms deal with Saudi Arabia called Al-Yamamah guaranteeing British maintenance, training, and rearmament of any British aircraft sold to Saudi Arabia, including BAE's Typhoon jets. The deal was open-ended. The UK National Audit Office (NAO) investigated the Al Yamamah contracts and has so far not published its conclusions, the only NAO report ever to be withheld. The MoD has stated "The report remains sensitive. Disclosure would harm both international relations and the UK's commercial interests."

The company has been accused of maintaining a £60 million Saudi slush fund. In November 2006, Saudi Arabia put pressure on the British government to end the SFO investigation by suspending negotiations over a new deal for seventy-two Typhoon fighter jets. On 14 December 2006 it was announced that the SFO was "discontinuing" its investigation into the company. It stated that representations to its director and the Attorney General Lord Goldsmith had led to the conclusion that the wider public interest "to safeguard national and international security" outweighed any potential benefits of further investigation. The termination of the investigation has been controversial. In June 2007, the BBC's Panorama alleged BAE Systems "paid hundreds of millions of pounds to the ex-Saudi ambassador to the US, Prince Bandar bin Sultan" in return for his role in the Al Yamamah deals. In late June 2007 the DOJ began a formal investigation into BAE's compliance with anti-corruption laws. On 19 May 2008 BAE Systems confirmed that its CEO Mike Turner and non-executive director Nigel Rudd had been detained "for about 20 minutes" at two US airports the previous week and that the DOJ had issued "a number of additional subpoenas in the US to employees of BAE Systems plc and BAE Systems Inc as part of its ongoing investigation". The Times suggested that such "humiliating behaviour by the DOJ" is unusual toward a company that is co-operating fully.

A judicial review of the decision by the SFO to drop the investigation was granted on 9 November 2007. On 10 April 2008 the High Court ruled that the SFO "acted unlawfully" by dropping its investigation. The Times described the ruling as "one of the most strongly worded judicial attacks on government action" which condemned how "ministers 'buckled' to 'blatant threats' that Saudi cooperation in the fight against terrorism would end unless the ...investigation was dropped." On 24 April the SFO was granted leave to appeal to the House of Lords against the ruling. There was a two-day hearing before the Lords on 7 and 8 July 2008. On 30 July the House of Lords unanimously overturned the High Court ruling, stating that the decision to discontinue the investigation was lawful.

=== Others ===
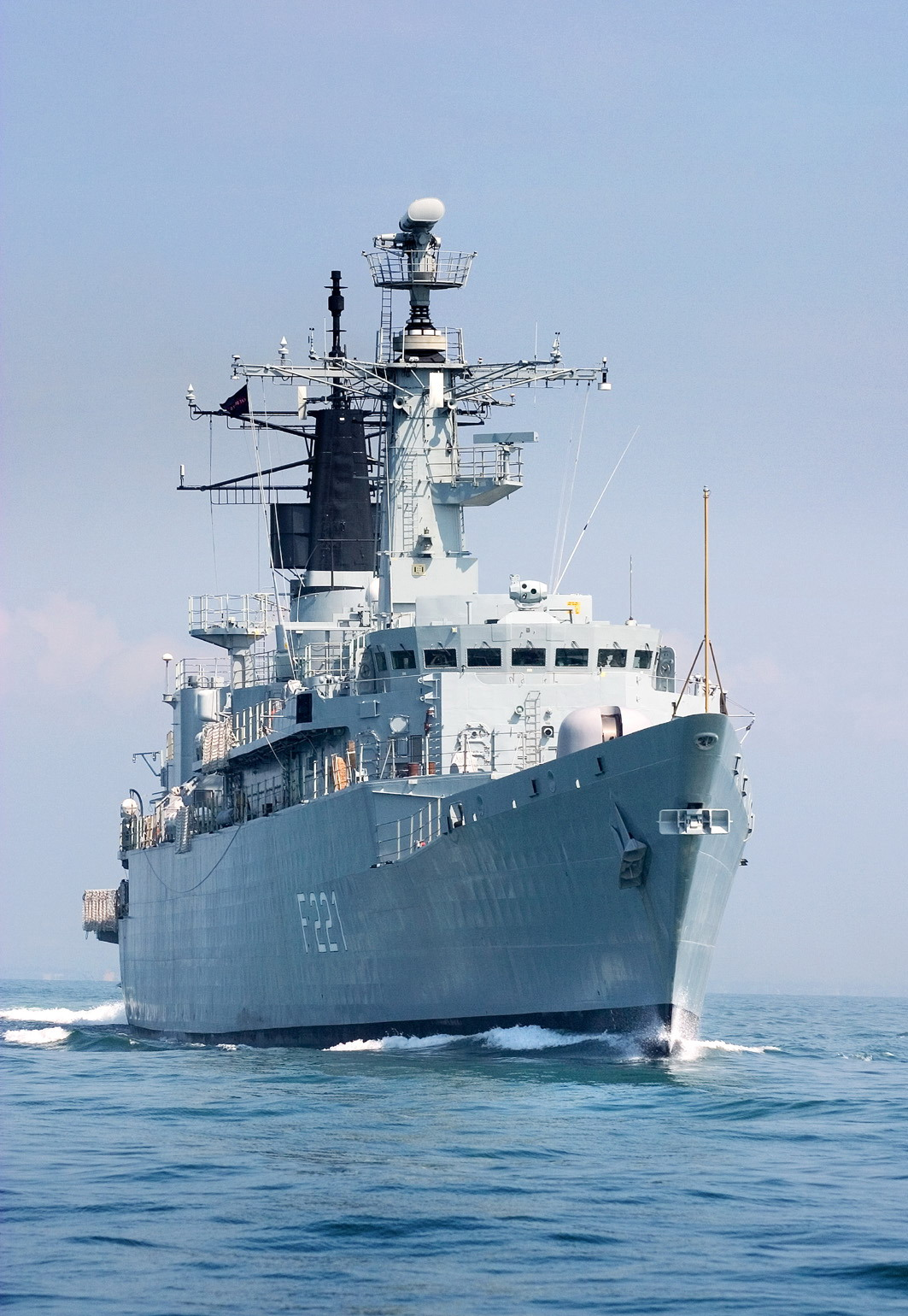
HMS Coventry was one of two frigates sold to Romania.

In September 2005, The Guardian reported that banking records showed that BAE Systems paid £1 million to Augusto Pinochet, the former Chilean dictator. The Guardian has also reported that "clandestine arms deals" have been under investigation in Chile and the UK since 2003 and that British Aerospace and BAE Systems made a number of payments to Pinochet advisers.

BAE Systems is alleged to have paid "secret offshore commissions" of over £7 million to secure the sale of HMS London and HMS Coventry to the Romanian Navy. The company received a £116 million contract for the refurbishment of the ships prior to delivery; however, the British taxpayer only received the scrap value of £100,000 each from the sale.

BAE Systems ran into controversy in 2002 over the abnormally high cost of a radar system sold to Tanzania. The sale was criticised by several opposition MPs and the World Bank; Secretary of State for International Development Clare Short declared that BAE Systems had "ripped off" developing nations.

In January 2007, details of an investigation by the SFO into BAE Systems' sales tactics in regard to South Africa were reported, highlighting the £2.3 billion deal to supply Hawk trainers and Gripen fighters as suspect. In May 2011, as allegations of bribery behind South Africa's Gripen procurement continued, the company's partner Saab AB issued strong denials of any illicit payments being made; however, in June 2011 Saab announced that BAE Systems had made unaccounted payments of roughly $3.5 million to a consultant; this revelation prompted South African opposition parties to call for a renewed inquiry. The Gripen's procurement by the Czech Republic was also under investigation by the SFO in 2006 over allegations of bribery.

== Criticism ==
=== Espionage ===
In September 2003, The Sunday Times reported that BAE Systems had hired a private security contractor to collect information about individuals working at CAAT and their activities. In February 2007, it was reported that the corporation had again obtained private confidential information from CAAT.

The company was reported in 2012 to have been the target of Chinese cyber espionage that may have stolen secrets related to the F-35 Lightning II.

In 2020, former employee Simon Finch, who became disillusioned when his reports of homophobic attacks in 2013 were not investigated properly, was convicted of a breach of the Official Secrets Act, after "recording from memory highly sensitive details of a UK missile system." In November 2020, he was sentenced to 4 years and 6 months in prison.

=== Cluster bombs ===
In 2003, BAE Systems was criticised for its role in the production of cluster bombs, due to the long-term risk for injury or death to civilians. Following the 2008 Oslo Convention on Cluster Munitions BAE Systems was among the first defence contractors to stop their manufacture and by 2012 the majority of the munitions had been destroyed.

=== Saudi intervention in Yemen ===
Saudi Arabia is BAE's third-biggest market. During the Saudi-led intervention in Yemen, British weapons were responsible for most of the Yemeni deaths, in what The Guardian called at the time "the world's worst humanitarian crisis." The Independent reported that BAE-supplied aircraft were used to bomb Red Cross and MSF hospitals in Yemen, and the UN claimed civilians were being specifically targeted by the coalition. Sir Roger Carr rejected criticism over BAE's continued work in Saudi Arabia, saying "We will stop doing it when they tell us to stop doing it... We maintain peace by having the ability to make war and that has stood the test of time."

BAE Systems sold weaponry worth £17.6 billion to Saudi Arabia during the Yemen war. In addition to the weapons, BAE Systems also provided maintenance work and engineers to the Gulf state as the Saudi military lacked the necessary expertise. Around 6,300 British contractors were thus stationed in Saudi operating bases, training Saudi pilots, conducting essential maintenance, and supervising the loading of bombs onto aircraft.

In December 2019, BAE was one of ten companies named in a report submitted by NGOs to the Office of the Prosecutor of the International Criminal Court. The report called on the ICC to investigate the role of executives of European arms companies, including BAE, and licensing officials in violations of international humanitarian law that could amount to war crimes in Yemen.

=== Israel's war in Gaza ===
Direct action was taken against arms companies in the United Kingdom, including BAE Systems, that supplied weapons to Israel during the Gaza war. For instance, on 10 November 2023, trade unionists in Rochester, Kent, blocked the entrances to a BAE Systems factory, stating the facility manufactured military aircraft components used to bomb the Gaza Strip.

=== Political influence and donations ===
Former Foreign Secretary Robin Cook said of his time in office that he "came to learn that the chairman of BAE appeared to have the key to the garden door to number 10. Certainly I never knew No 10 to come up with any decision which would be incommoding to BAE."

In the United States BAE Systems is a significant political donor to both Democratic and Republican candidates and organisations. In 2016, its political action committee (PAC) contributions were the second largest of any foreign corporation after UBS. In January 2021, following the 2021 United States Capitol attack, BAE Systems announced that it was suspending political donations in the US. On 30 March 2021, it once again began making large political contributions, including one to the National Republican Senatorial Committee.

=== Impact on Humanitarian Aid ===
In October 2025, The Guardian reported that BAE systems is facing a potential £187 million legal claim for the withdrawal of support of its Advanced Turbo-Prop (ATP) aircraft which has been used by a Kenya air-cargo operator EnComm Aviation to provide humanitarian aid across east Africa. The Times reported that BAE pulled support for the ATP "without providing any opportunity for consultation or stakeholder engagement, despite claiming to do so".

According to emails and meetings between BAE's senior leadership and EnComm Aviation, the Kenyan air-cargo operator was led to believe BAE would provide continued support for the ATP aircraft for at least five years.

In May 2026, Encomm Aviation filed a £120 million claim against BAE systems, in which it described BAE's decision to withdraw support as "virtually unprecedented in aviation history". The claim maintains that BAE systems "failed in its duty not to cause loss" when it voluntarily withdrew support for EnComm Aviation's aircraft. The filing followed a pre-action letter sent by lawyers acting for EnComm Aviation.

BAE's move is alleged to have triggered the cancellation of several contracts including one with the UN's World Food Programme to fly aid to 12 destinations across Somalia.

EnComm Aviation, the last known operator of the ATP aircraft, specialised in the delivery of humanitarian aid and had invested nearly £100 million in a multi-year development programme, including the acquisition of a full-motion ATP simulator. EnComm Aviation operated out of Nairobi Jomo Kenyatta and led operations to Somalia, South Sudan, and the Democratic Republic of Congo (DRC). Since 2023, EnComm had brought 12 ATP airframes, ten freighters and two passenger aircraft, from long-term storage from West Air Sweden.

== See also ==
- Aerospace industry in the United Kingdom
- Espionage
- Counterespionage
