= Richard Evans (businessman) =

British chairman of Samruk-Kazyna

Richard Evans CBE

Chairman of Samruk-Kazyna
- Incumbent
- Assumed office October 2006

Chancellor of the University of Central Lancashire
- Incumbent
- Assumed office 2001

Personal details
- Born: 1942 (age 83–84) Blackpool, Lancashire, England

Sir Richard Harry Evans (also known as Dick Evans), CBE, DL, FRAeS (born 1942, Blackpool) is a British businessman who is chairman of the Kazakh state holding company Samruk-Kazyna. He was formerly chairman of the British arms manufacturer BAE Systems.

In 2001, he became Chancellor of the University of Central Lancashire. Evans was appointed a CBE in the 1986 Birthday Honours for services to export and was knighted in the 1996 Birthday Honours.

== Career ==
Evans was educated at the Royal Masonic School in Bushey, Hertfordshire. In 1960, he joined the Ministry of Transport and Civil Aviation and was soon moved into the then newly formed Ministry of Technology.

In 1967, Evans was appointed as Government Contracts Officer at Ferranti in Manchester and two years later joined British Aircraft Corporation (BAC) at Warton, Lancashire.

He was promoted to Commercial Director of what had then become the Warton Division of British Aerospace (BAe) in 1978. Following BAe Aircraft Group managerial changes in January 1983, Evans was appointed Deputy Managing Director for BAe Warton and a member of the Aircraft Group Board. Evans was appointed Chief Executive of the Company in 1990. In June 1992, he was elected for a one-year term as President of the Society of British Aerospace Companies.

On 1 May 1998, Evans was appointed Chairman of British Aerospace plc. In 1997, he joined the Board of United Utilities plc as a Non-Executive Director and was appointed chairman on 1 January 2001. In 1998, he became a Non-Executive Director of NatWest plc and resigned in February 2000. In 2001, Evans was installed as the second Chancellor of the University of Central Lancashire.

During his time at BAE, Evans was instrumental in striking the Al-Yamamah arms deal. He was named in investigations by the Serious Fraud Office (SFO) concerning allegations of a £60m slush fund destined for private members of the Saudi Royal family in connection with Al-Yamamah, and alleged secret payments totalling £80m in relation to aircraft deals with South Africa. He was interviewed at length by the SFO but was eventually released without charge and denied any wrongdoing. In 2004, he stepped down as chairman of BAE after admitting compliance failings under his leadership. However, he was retained as an adviser on Saudi Arabia until 2009, just weeks after BAE agreed a settlement with the SFO over the bribery allegations.

In October 2006, Evans was appointed as Chairman of the Board of Directors of State Holding Company Samruk, Kazakhstan. In October 2008, Evans was elected to the Board of Directors of "Samruk-Kazyna" as an independent director. In January 2014, he was again elected as an Independent Director of the Board of Directors of "Samruk-Kazyna" JSC.

== Other interests ==
Evans has also been elected an Honorary Member of the NSPCC Council. During his chairmanship of BAE Systems, he was the most senior supporter of the BAE Systems Charity Challenge, a body which co-ordinates and supports charitable activities of its employees. He is married with three daughters and is a keen golfer and classic car enthusiast.

== See also ==
- Al-Yamamah arms deal
- Kazakhstan-United Kingdom relations

Academic offices
Preceded by Sir Francis Kennedy	Chancellor of the University of Central Lancashire; 2001–present	Incumbent
