= Michael Turner (businessman) =

British businessman (born 1948)

Michael John Turner CBE
- Born: 5 August 1948 (age 77)
- Education: Didsbury Technical High School
- Alma mater: Manchester Polytechnic
- Known for: CEO of BAE Systems, 2002–2008

Michael John Turner CBE (born 5 August 1948) is the former chief executive officer (CEO) of the aerospace and defence company BAE Systems, former chairman of Babcock International and prior to the hostile takeover by Melrose was chairman of GKN plc.

== Early life ==
He attended Didsbury Technical High School (became Wilbraham High School in 1965) on School Lane in Didsbury. He gained a BA from Manchester Polytechnic in 1970, whilst working for Hawker Siddeley Aviation which he joined in 1966.

== Career ==
Turner replaced the previous CEO at BAE Systems plc, John Weston, in March 2002 who was dismissed. Turner has previously been a chief operating officer (COO) of the company, responsible for all of the company's business units.

Both Turner and BAE's previous chairman, Sir Richard Evans, have had an abrasive relationship with senior Ministry of Defence officials. The relationship deteriorated over cost over-runs and delays to major procurement projects, for example BAE announced a shock profit warning in December 2002 related to two major projects, the Astute-class submarine and the Nimrod MRA4. BAE took a £750 million hit against these projects.

On 15 October 2007 it was announced by BAE Systems that Turner would step down from his role in 2008. On 1 September 2008 Ian King the COO took over from Turner as CEO.

Turner is a member of the Apprenticeship Ambassadors Network and was awarded the prestigious "Honorary Apprenticeship Award" in July 2009.

=== Career timeline ===
- 1966 – Undergraduate Commercial Apprentice, Hawker Siddeley Aviation.
- 1970 – Contracts Officer, Hawker Siddeley Aviation.
- 1978 – Contracts Manager (Military), British Aerospace Aircraft Group Manchester Division.
- 1981 – Executive Director - Administration, British Aerospace
- 1982 – Divisional Administration Director, British Aerospace
- Early 1980s to 1984 – Advanced Turboprop (ATP) Project team leader, British Aerospace
- 1984 – Divisional Director and General Manager, Kingston, British Aerospace. Responsible for BAE's Kingston and Dunsfold Park facilities, which manufactured the Harrier and Hawk aircraft respectively.
- 1986 – Director and General Manager, Weybridge, Kingston and Dunsfold, part of BAe's Military Aircraft Division.
- 1987 – Director Marketing and Product Support, BAe Military Aircraft Division.
- 1988 – Executive Vice President Defence Marketing, British Aerospace
- 1992 – Chairman and Managing Director, British Aerospace Regional Aircraft and Chairman of Jetstream Aircraft.
- 1994 – Promoted to the British Aerospace board as of 1 January
- 1994 – Chairman of Commercial Aerospace, which included BAE's Airbus factories.
- 1995 – Vice-President of the Society of British Aerospace Companies until 1996, then President from June 1996 until June 1997.
- 1996 – Non-Executive Director of Babcock International Group.
- 1996 – Head of BAE's defence export businesses
- 1998 – Appointed to the Airbus Supervisory Board. Retained this seat with the formation of Airbus SAS in 2001 until BAE sold its 20% share in 2006.
- 1999 – With the formation of BAE Systems, became Chief Operating Officer.
- 2002 – Replaced John Weston as CEO.
- 2005 – Non-Executive Director of P&O. Stepped down in March 2006.
- 2006 – Executive Directorship at Lazard Ltd
- 2008 – Non-Executive Chairman of Babcock International Group.
- 2012 – Non-Executive Chairman of GKN Plc
- 2018- Non-Executive Barclays PLC

== Personal life ==
In 1972, he married Rosalind Thomas and they have two sons. He received a CBE for services to the Aerospace Industry in the Queen's 1999 Birthday Honours. 2014 NED FTSE 100 Chairman of the year.

== See also ==
- The Superclass List
