= M109 howitzer =

American 155 mm self-propelled howitzer

M109
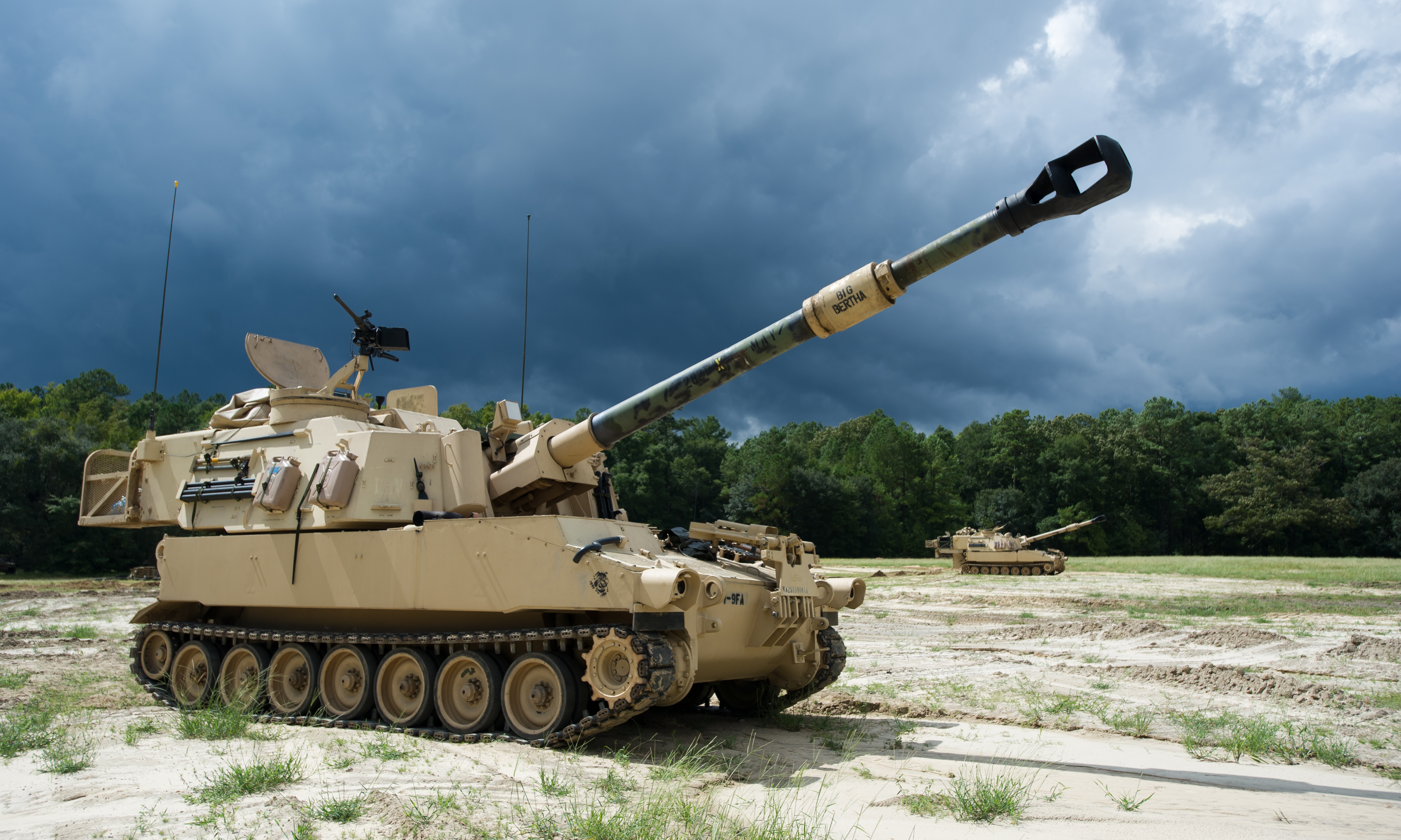
- M109A6
- Type: Self-propelled artillery
- Place of origin: United States

Service history
- In service: M109: 1963–present M109A1: 1973–present M109A2: 1979–present M109A6: 1994–present M109A7: 2015–present
- Used by: See Operators
- Wars: Vietnam War; Cambodian Civil War; Yom Kippur War; Western Sahara War; Iran–Iraq War; 1982 Lebanon war South Lebanon conflict (1985–2000); Persian Gulf War; Iraq War; Gaza War; 2014 Israel–Gaza conflict War in Iraq (2013-2017); Yemeni Civil War (2014–present), Saudi Arabian-led intervention in Yemen; Syrian Civil War; Russian invasion of Ukraine; Gaza war 2025 Cambodian–Thai clashes

Production history
- Designed: 1952–1962
- Manufacturer: Cadillac; General Motors; Chrysler; BMY Harsco, formerly Bowen & McLaughlin York (1974–1994); United Defense (1994–2005); BAE Systems Inc. (2005–present) Samsung (1985–2015); Hanwha (2015–present)

Specifications
- Mass: M109A1/A2/A3/A4/A5: empty weight of 52,000 lbs (23.6 metric tons) and combat weight of 55,000 lbs (24.95 metric tons) M109A6: non-combat weight of 56,400 lbs (25.6 metric tons) and combat weight of 62,000 lbs to 63,615 lbs (28.1 metric tons to 28.9 metric tons) M109A7: non- combat weight of 74,000 to 78,000 lbs (33.6 metric tons to 35.4 metric tons) and combat weight of 84,000 lbs (38 metric tons)
- Length: M109: hull length of 20.3 ft and length with gun forward of 30 ft M109A1/A2/A3/A4/A5/A6/A7: hull length of 20.3 ft, length with gun forward of 32 ft
- Width: 10 ft 4 in (3.15 m)
- Height: 10 ft 8 in (3.25 m)
- Crew: 6 (commander, driver, gunner, 3 loaders); M109A6–A7: 4 (commander, driver, gunner, loader)
- Shell: separate loading, bagged charge
- Breech: interrupted screw
- Traverse: 360°
- Rate of fire: Maximum: 4 rpm/3 min. Sustained: 1 rpm
- Effective firing range: M109A1–A4: 18.1 km (11.2 mi) (M107, HE); 23.5 km (14.6 mi) (M549A1, RAP/HE) M109A5–A7: HE: 21 km (13 mi); RAP: 30 km (19 mi); Excalibur: 40 km (25 mi)
- Armor: Aluminum alloy
- Main armament: M109: M126 155 mm 23 caliber, 28 rounds M109A1–A4: Watervliet Arsenal M185 155 mm 39 caliber, 28 rounds (A1) or 36 rounds (A2–A4) M109A5–A7: M284 155 mm 39 caliber
- Secondary armament: .50 caliber (12.7 mm) M2 machine gun
- Engine: M109: Detroit Diesel 8V71T 8-cylinder water-cooled turbocharged diesel engine 390 hp @ 2,300 rpm; M109A1–A4: Detroit Diesel 8V71T 8-cylinder water-cooled supercharged diesel engine 405 hp @ 2.300 rpm; M109A5–A6: Detroit Diesel 8V71T 8-cylinder water-cooled supercharged diesel engine 440 hp; M109A7: V903 675 hp
- Transmission: Allison Transmission XTG-411-2A, 4 forward, 2 reverse M109A6: Allison Transmission XTG-411-4 M109A7: HMPT-800
- Suspension: torsion bar
- Ground clearance: M109A7: longitudinal slope: 60 % lateral slope: 40 % trench: 72 in (1.8 m) fording: 42 in (1.07 m)
- Operational range: 216 mi (350 km); M109A7: 186 mi (300 km)
- Maximum speed: 35 mph (56 km/h); M109A7: 38 mph (61 km/h)

The M109, is an American 155 mm turreted self-propelled howitzer, first introduced in the early 1960s to replace the M44 and M52. It has been upgraded a number of times, most recently to the M109A7. The M109 family is the most common Western indirect-fire support weapon of maneuver brigades of armored and mechanized infantry divisions. It has a crew of four: the section chief/commander, the driver, the gunner, and the ammunition handler/loader.

M109 at the Museum of Military History, Vienna

The British Army replaced its M109s with the AS-90. Several European armed forces have or are currently replacing older M109s with the German PzH 2000. Upgrades to the M109 were introduced by the U.S. (see variants) and by Switzerland (KAWEST). With the cancellation of the U.S. Crusader, non-line-of-sight cannon and M1299, the M109A6 ("Paladin") will likely remain the principal self-propelled howitzer for the U.S. until a replacement enters service.

== Operational history ==
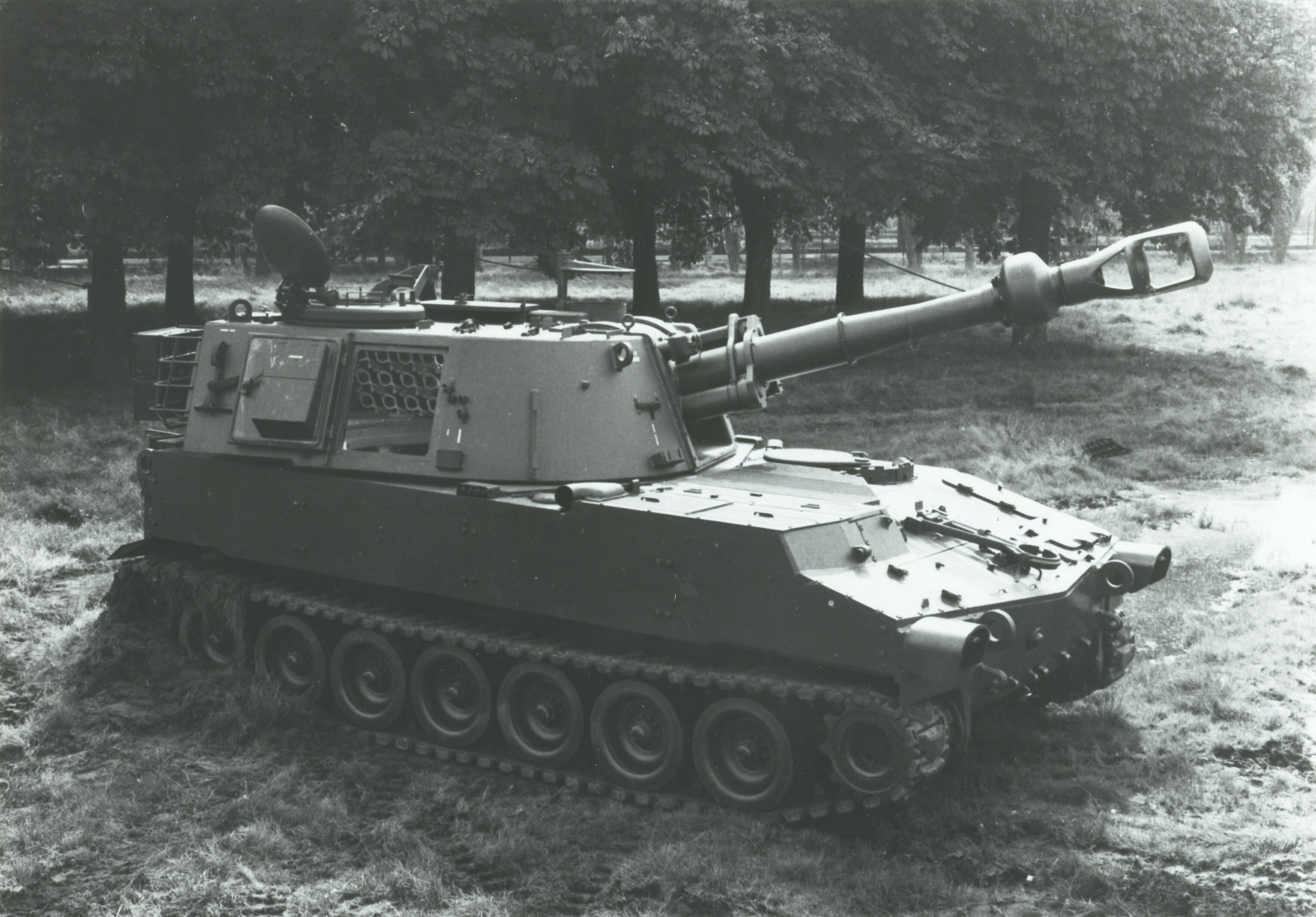
Early M109 howitzer of the Royal Netherlands Army

The M109 was the medium variant of a U.S. program to adopt a common chassis for its self-propelled artillery units. The light version, the M108 Howitzer, was phased out during the Vietnam War, but many were rebuilt as M109s.

The M109 saw its combat debut in Vietnam. Around 200 vehicles were deployed in 1966, but the entire fleet suffered a mechanical malfunction within a year of operation. The U.S. dispatched engineers and mechanics, but all M109s were recalled back to the U.S. in 1967 after failing to repair in the field. The howitzer underwent upgrades afterward, which resulted in the M109A1.

Israel used the M109 against Egypt in the 1973 Yom Kippur War and in the 1982 and 2006 Lebanon Wars. Iran used the M109 in the Iran–Iraq War in the 1980s. The M109 saw service with the British, U.S. Army, Egyptian and Saudi Arabian Armies in the 1991 Gulf War. The M109 also saw service with the U.S. Army in the Iraq War from 2003 to 2011.

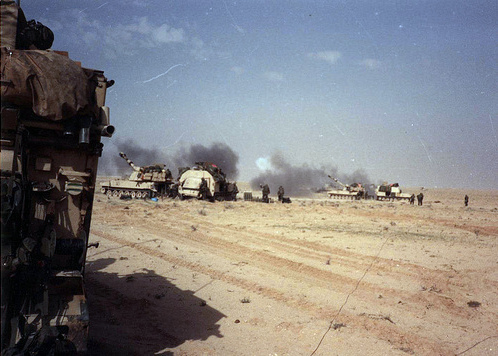
M109 howitzers belonging to 4th Battalion of the 3rd Field Artillery Regiment, 2nd Armored Division (FWD) conducts artillery strikes on Iraqi positions during the Gulf War

Upgrades to the cannon, ammunition, fire control, survivability, and other electronics systems over the design's lifespan have expanded the system's capabilities, including tactical nuclear projectiles, guided projectiles (Copperhead), rocket-assisted projectiles (RAP), family of scatterable mines (FASCAM), and cluster munitions (the dual-purpose improved conventional munition, DPICM).

In August 2015, South Korean K55A1s fired rounds behind the Military Demarcation Line as a warning after several North Korean provocations.

During the Russian invasion of Ukraine, Ukraine has used M109 howitzers donated by Western countries. According to video and photographic evidence compiled by the open-source intelligence website Oryx, as of 24 September 2024, at least 70 units of different variants had been lost (54 destroyed and 16 damaged).

== Design ==
The M109 was developed by the Ground System Division of United Defense LP, later BAE Systems Platforms & Services.

=== Armament ===
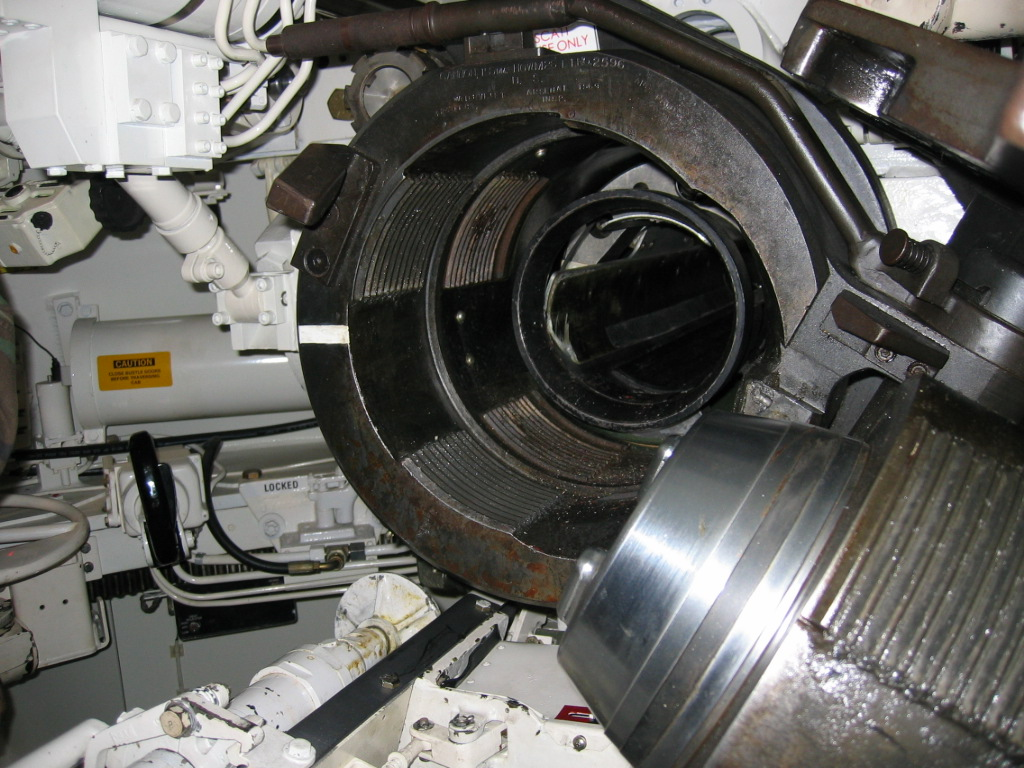
Open breech of a M109A5 howitzer

- Primary by Watervliet Arsenal: M126 Cannon (or M126A1) 155 mm Howitzer (M109), M185 Cannon 155 mm Howitzer (A1/A2/A3/A4), or M284 Cannon 155 mm Howitzer (A5/A6)
- Secondary: .50 caliber (12.7 mm) M2 machine gun, Mk 19 Mod 3 40 mm Automatic Grenade Launcher, 7.62 mm M60, M240 machine gun or L4 machine gun

=== Mobility ===
The M109 was powered by the 8V71T, a 8-cylinder water-cooled diesel engine, produced by the Detroit Diesel Engine Division of General Motors Corporation. The 8V71T is a turbocharged version of the 8V71 commercial truck engine. It was rated 390 hp at 2300 rpm and was used in the M107, M108, M110, and M578 series as well.

== Variants ==
=== M109 ===
First produced in 1963. It had a 155 mm M126 cannon in an M127 mount, and carried 28 rounds of 155 mm ammunition. It was also armed with a .50cal M2HB machine gun with 500 rounds of ammunition. Easily identified by its short barrel and a double baffle muzzle brake with a large fume extractor just behind it. Maximum range of 14,600 meters.

==== M109G ====
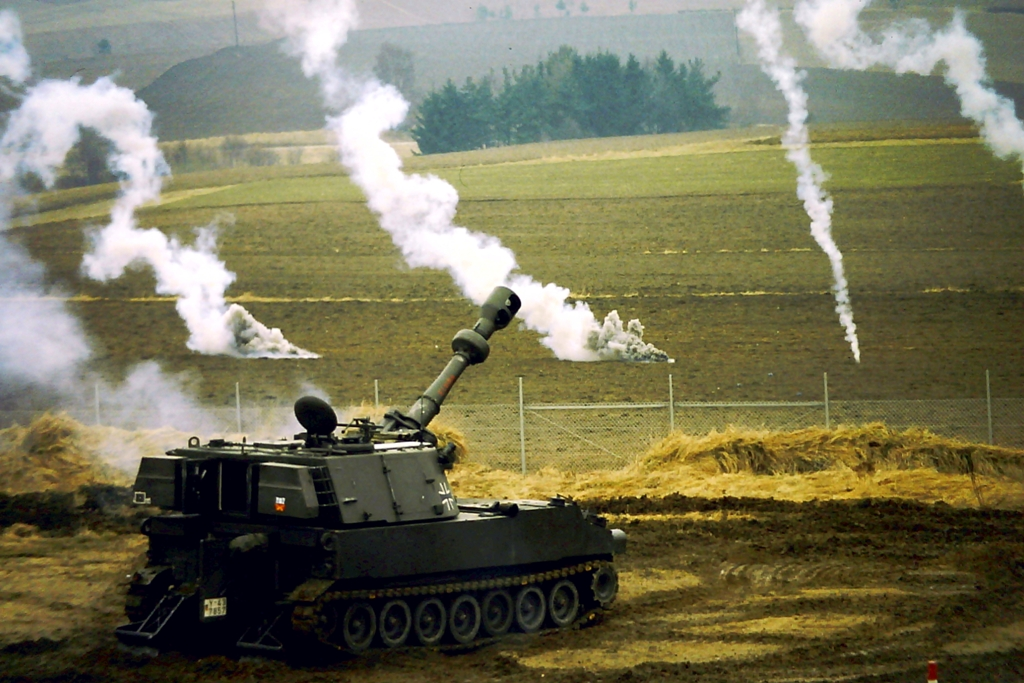
M109G of the Bundeswehr in 1982

The West German army M109s were designated as the M109G, and featured a breechblock system developed by Rheinmetall extending the effective range to 18 kilometres (11 mi) or 18.5 kilometres (11.5 mi) according to some sources, a new fire control system, and three smoke dischargers mounted on either side of the turret as well.

In December 1966, the United States and Norway signed an agreement related to the co-production of the M109G.

=== M109A1 ===
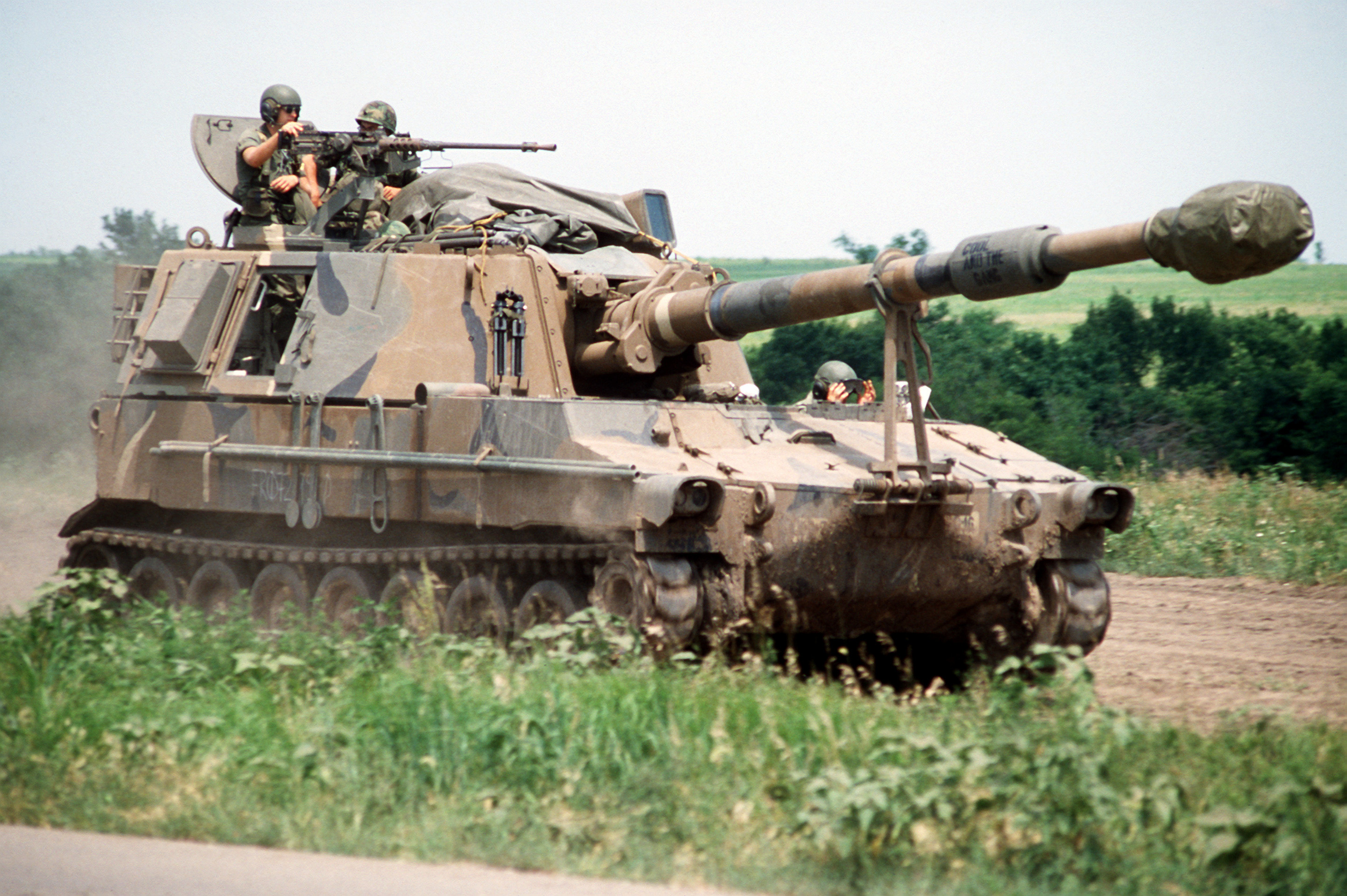
US Army M109A1 in 1982

Fielded in 1973, this modification replaced the M126 cannon with a 39 caliber M185, featuring a longer barrel while increasing maximum range to 18,100 meters.

==== M109A1B ====
The M109 rebuilt to M109A1 standard.

==== M109 66/74 ====
The M109 (Pz Hb) 66/74 is a Swiss upgraded M109 (Pz Hb 66) to M109A1B (Pz Hb 74) standard.

Switzerland purchased 146 M109 under the armament program 1968, and introduction of the howitzer started in 1971. All vehicles received upgrade to M109A1B (Pz Hb 74) standard and were delivered from May 1977 to February 1979.

=== M109A2 ===
Incorporated 27 Reliability, Availability, and Maintainability (RAM) mid-life improvements. Most notably, the long barreled 155 mm M185 Cannon in the new M178 gun mount, ballistic protection for the panoramic telescope, counterbalanced travel lock, and the ability to mount the M140 bore sight alignment device. Stowage of 155 mm rounds increased from 28 to 36 rounds; .50cal ammunition remained at 500 rounds. Fielded in 1979.

During M109A2 production, a slightly simplified version was also produced for export. This had minor internal changes and deleted the hull flotation feature. These were designated M109A1B.

==== K55 ====
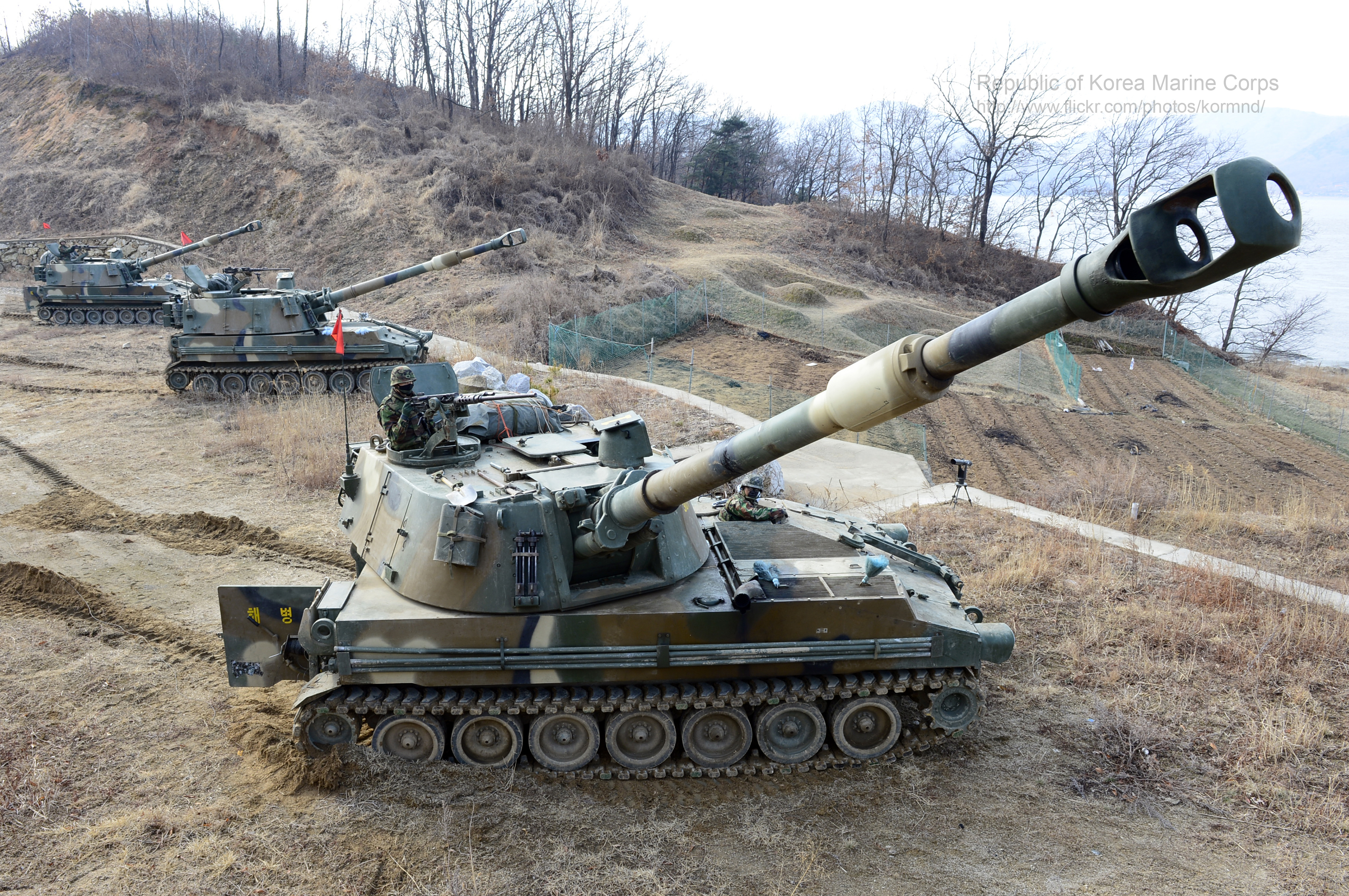
K55 howitzers of Republic of Korea Marine Corps in 2013

The K55 is a South Korean license produced variant of the M109A2. In the 1960s, the South Korean Army received M107 and M110 from the United States. However, the number of these self-propelled guns was insufficient to counter rapidly-growing North Korean artillery capabilities. In the 1970s, South Korea began mass-producing towed howitzers locally, but intelligence reports of North Korean 170 mm self-propelled artillery forced South Korea to look for a new self-propelled artillery system.

In December 1983, defense officials of the United States and South Korea signed a memorandum of understanding (MOU) to co-produce M109A2 in South Korea using American technical data. The United States delivered two completed M109A2s to South Korea for operational review, and the Agency for Defense Development began to translate the data package and created field and maintenance manuals for soldiers. South Korea wanted to produce every part of the vehicle domestically; however, due to the amendment bill by Rep. Samuel S. Stratton of New York, which established a limit for foreign military technology cooperation, the turret and the M185 cannon from Watervliet Arsenal were imported from the United States.

Compared to the M109A2, besides 63 percent of parts being produced locally, K55 has a driver's night periscope and light exposure minimization device to enhance night-time operations as well as additional radio systems. The vehicle has a nuclear, biological and chemical protection system and halon fire extinguishers. A total of 1,180 K55s were produced between 1985 and 1996. The vehicle's name was changed from KM109A2 to K55, originally a code name from the Samsung factory.

In November 1990, the United States and South Korea signed an agreement to allow South Korea to supply M109 parts to third parties. In May 1997, during the Security Cooperation Committee held in Washington D.C., South Korea requested that the United States revise the MOU to export complete K55s, originally intended for domestic use only. South Korea was expecting to export 72 K55s and four ammunition support vehicles to Brazil for $160 million over Belgium's offer, but the United States Department of Defense declined the request to avoid an arms race in the region.

In May 1998, the South Korean military began operating a K55 simulator to boost artillery operator training. The simulator took a year and a billion KRW budget to develop. It is expected to save 150 million KRW per year per device.

=== M109A3 ===
M109A1s rebuilt to M109A2 standard, also fielded in 1979. Some A3s feature three contact arm assemblies, while all A2s have five, which are part of the turret's electrical system. The contact arms provide multiple points of contact on the hull to the tank's main electrical systems, this ensures the turret has continuous power while rotating. Some variants have additional contacts for redundancy.

==== M109A3B ====
M109A1B rebuilt to M109A2 standard.

==== M109A3G ====
In 1983, the German Army purchased 586 conversion kits from the FMS Corporation (now Marvin Land Systems) to convert its fleet of M109Gs to the M109A3G standard. This upgraded variant uses a new gun barrel developed by Rheinmetall, giving an extended range of 24 kilometres (15 mi). It also features a new fire-control system, and three forward firing 76 mm smoke grenade launchers on either side of the turret.

==== M109A3GN ====
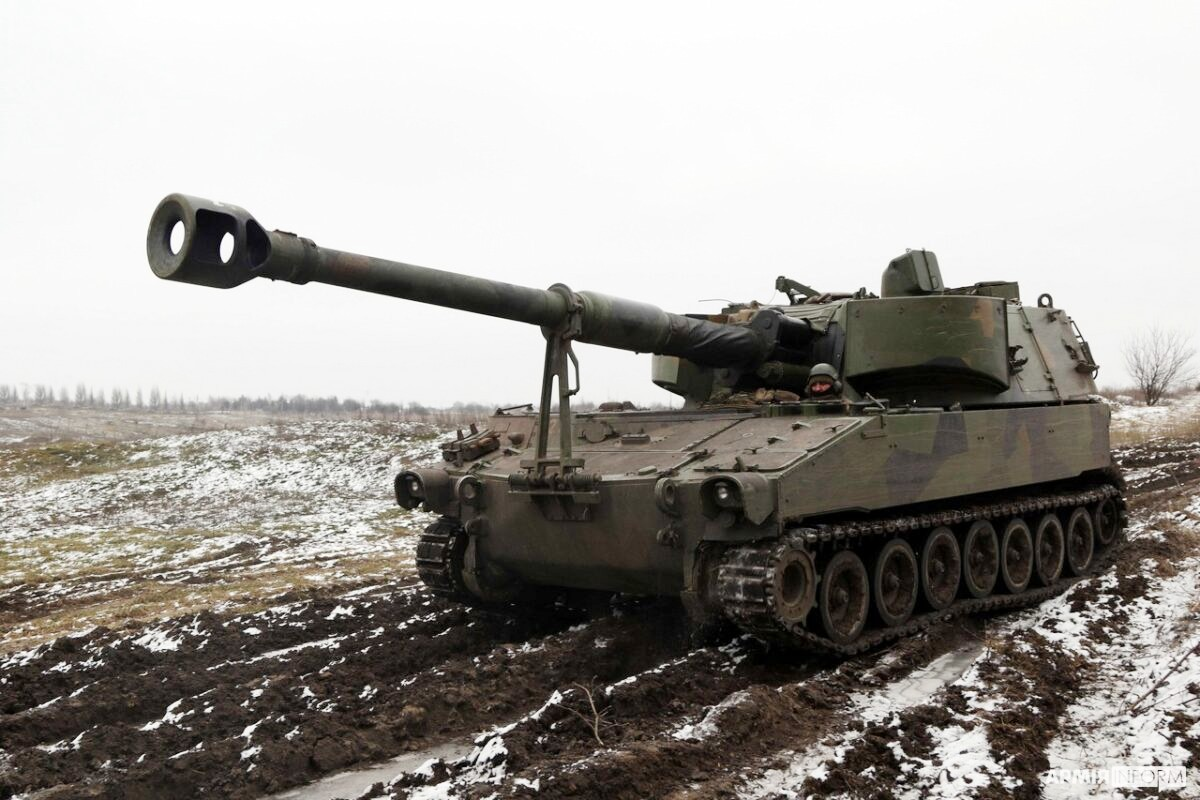
Ukraine's 72nd Mechanized Brigade operating an M109A3GN during the Russian invasion of Ukraine

Between 1969 and 1971 Norway acquired 126 M109Gs from West Germany. They were then upgraded to the M109A3GN configuration during the latter half of the 1980s.

=== M109A4 ===
Soon after the adoption of A2/A3 versions, the Division Weapon Support System study was initiated in 1980, which by the end of the decade resulted in the development of several modernization packages. The most modest one was the Howitzer Extended Life Program update originally designated as M1903A3E1 and later adopted as M109A4, initially scheduled for 1985-1987 but actually fielded in 1989 in the Reserve Component of the US Army.

This modernization program fitted M109A2s and M109A3s with Nuclear, Biological, and Chemical / Reliability, Availability, and Maintainability (NBC/RAM) improvements, including air purifiers, heaters, and Mission Oriented Protective Posture (MOPP) (protective) gear.

The traversing mechanism's clutch was changed to be hydraulic (as compared to the electric mechanism on previous M109s), and added a manual override. The M109A4 also gained a second hydraulic filter and more reliable engine starting equipment which greatly improved the ability to start the vehicle in an emergency.

Ammunition stowage remained the same as in previous models.

=== M109A5 ===
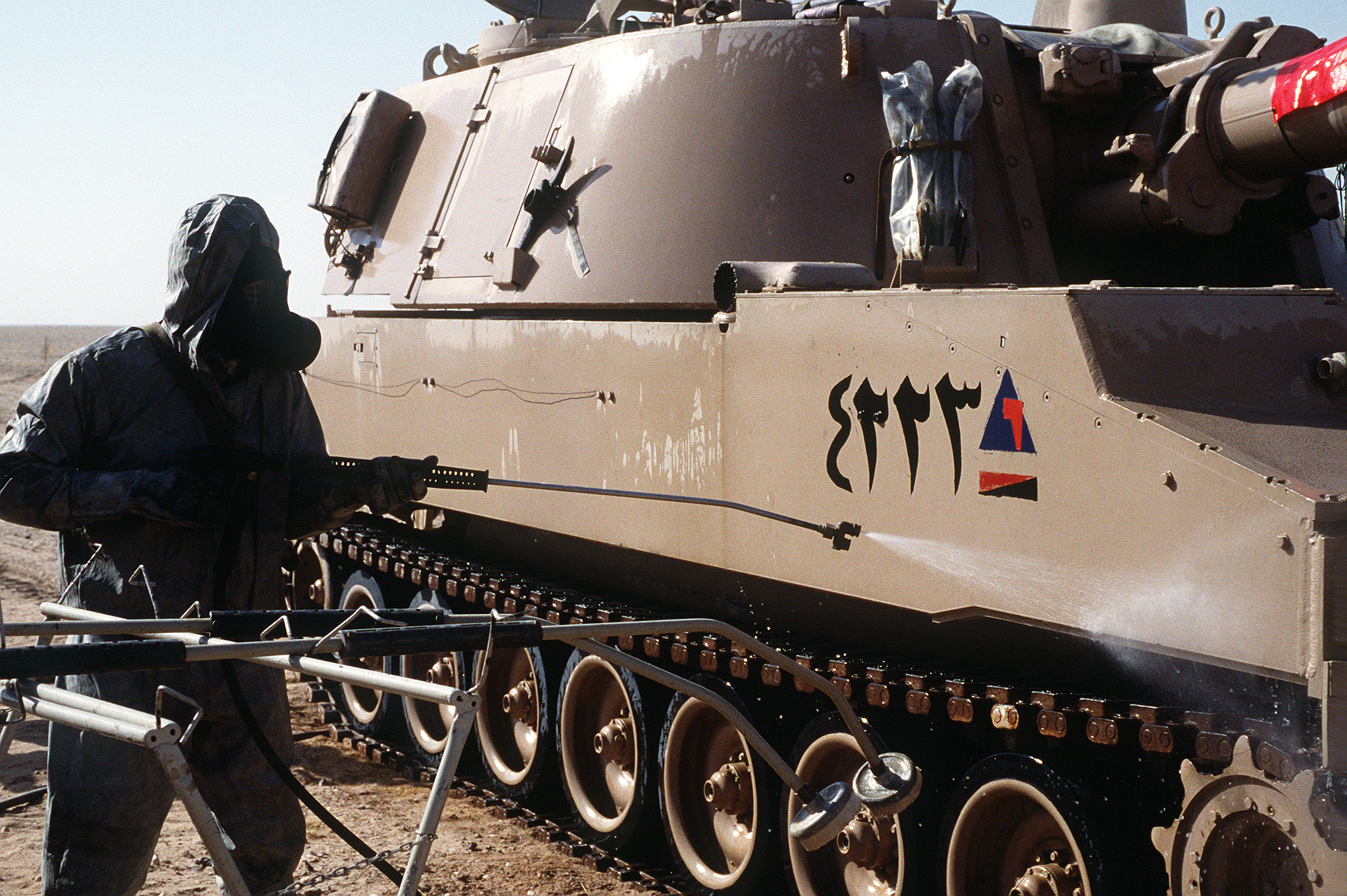
An Egyptian M109A5 being decontaminated during Operation Desert Shield.

This modification was also designed for the US Army Reserve, originally planned as an update for all M109A4s under the second phase of the Reserve Component Modified Armament System to bring the range up to the version adopted as M109A6. It was fielded in 1991 in much smaller numbers than originally devised due to the end of the Cold War.

It replaced the 155 mm M185 cannon in an M178 mount with a 39-caliber 155 mm M284 cannon in an M182 mount developed for the M109A3E2 (see below), giving the A5 a maximum range of 22,000 meters with unassisted projectiles and 30,000 meters with rocket-assisted projectile (RAP) rounds. The vehicle can carry 36 complete rounds of ammunition and has a 440 hp engine instead of the standard 405 hp engine.

==== M109A5+ ====
Various manufacturers have upgraded the fire control and other components of the M109A5. BAE Systems in York, PA delivered 12 M109A5+ vehicles to Chile in 2011 and 32 M109A5+ vehicles for Brazil in 2016.

=== M109A6 Paladin ===
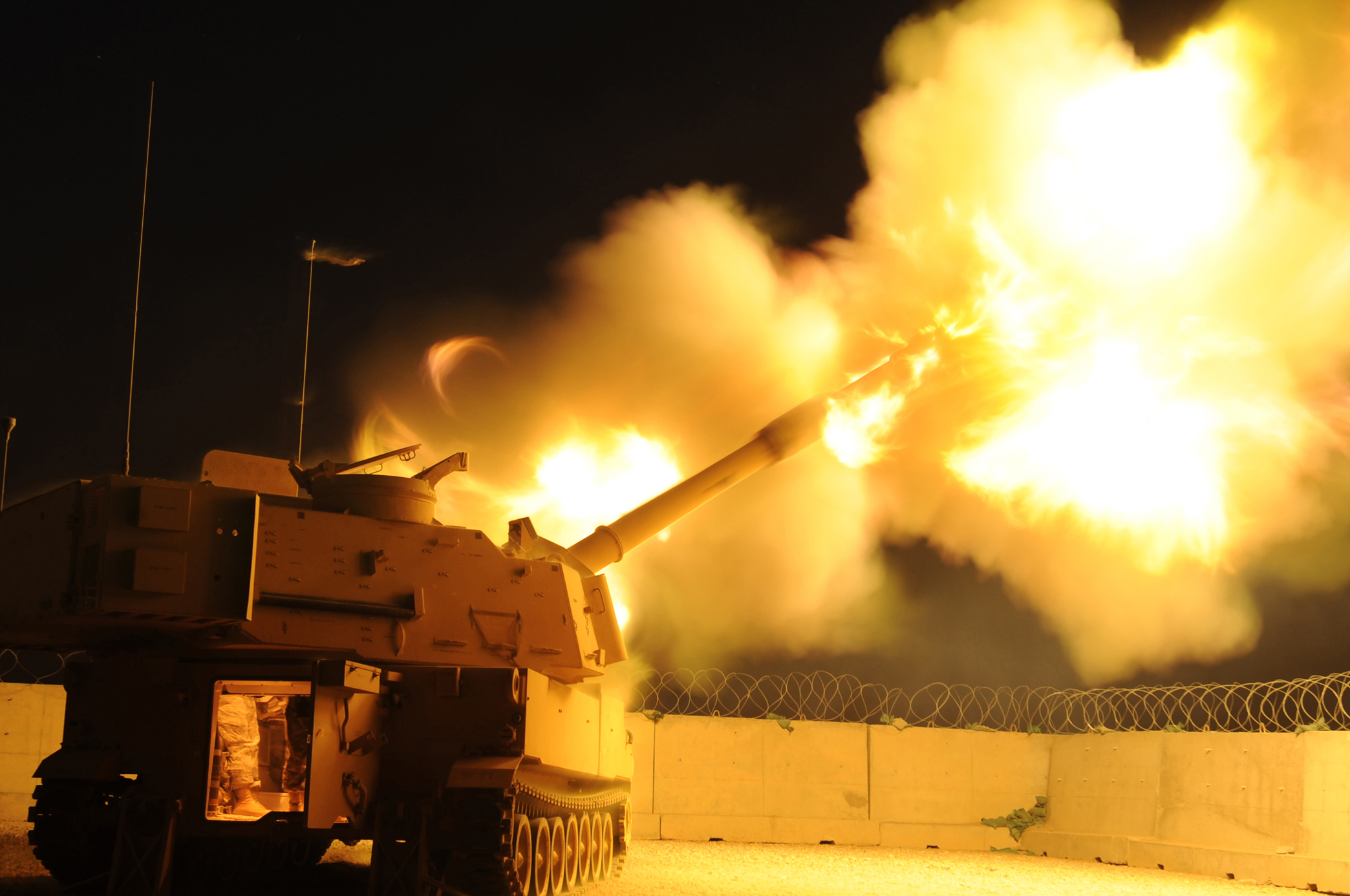
A M109A6 "Paladin" firing at night

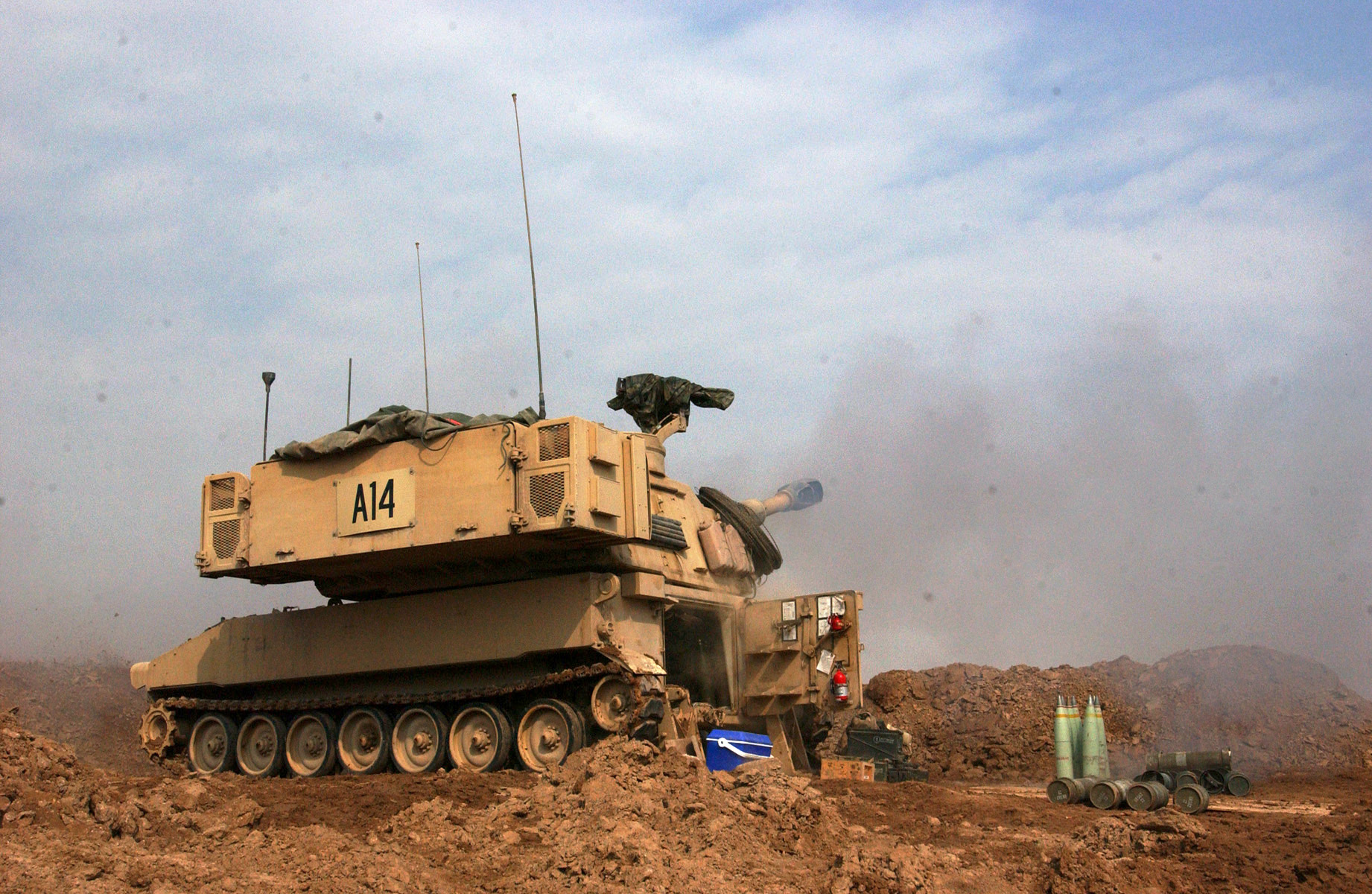
An M109A6 firing a shell during combat operations in Fallujah, Iraq

Also originating in the Division Weapon Support System study in early 1980s, the Howitzer Improvement Program was devised as a more extensive modernization than the Howitzer Extended Life Program. The vehicle was originally designed as M109A3E2 before being adopted as M109A6 and is now better known as Paladin (M109A3E3 was to feature a longer barrel but was not adopted).

The Paladin model has improvements in the areas of survivability, RAM, and armament. This includes increased armor, a redesigned internal arrangement for safer ammunition and equipment storage, engine and suspension upgrades, and improvement of the M284 Cannon and M182A1 Mount. The greatest difference is the integration of an inertial navigation system, sensors detecting the weapons' lay, automation, and an encrypted digital communication system, which utilizes computer controlled frequency-hopping to avoid enemy electronic warfare and allow the howitzer to send grid location and altitude to the battery Fire Direction Center (FDC).

The battery FDCs coordinates fire through a battalion or higher FDC. This allows the Paladin to halt from the move and fire within 30 seconds, with an accuracy equivalent to the previous models when properly emplaced, laid, and safed—a process that previously required several minutes under the best of circumstances. Tactically, this improves the system's survivability by allowing the battery to operate dispersed in pairs across the countryside, and allowing the howitzer to quickly move between salvos, or if attacked by indirect fire, aircraft, or ground forces.

Ammunition storage of 155 mm rounds was increased from 36 to 39.

Developed from 1984, it was adopted in 1990 with original plans to field the weapon in 1991 later slipping to 1992 and finally to 1993. The US Army received the last of 950 Paladins it had ordered in June 1999. Seven further Paladins were ordered for the National Guard in July 2000, with an additional eighteen received in January 2002. In May 2022, the US Army began shipping its M109A6 Paladins for refitting to the M109A7 standard in order to begin the process of modernization.

=== M109 KAWEST ===
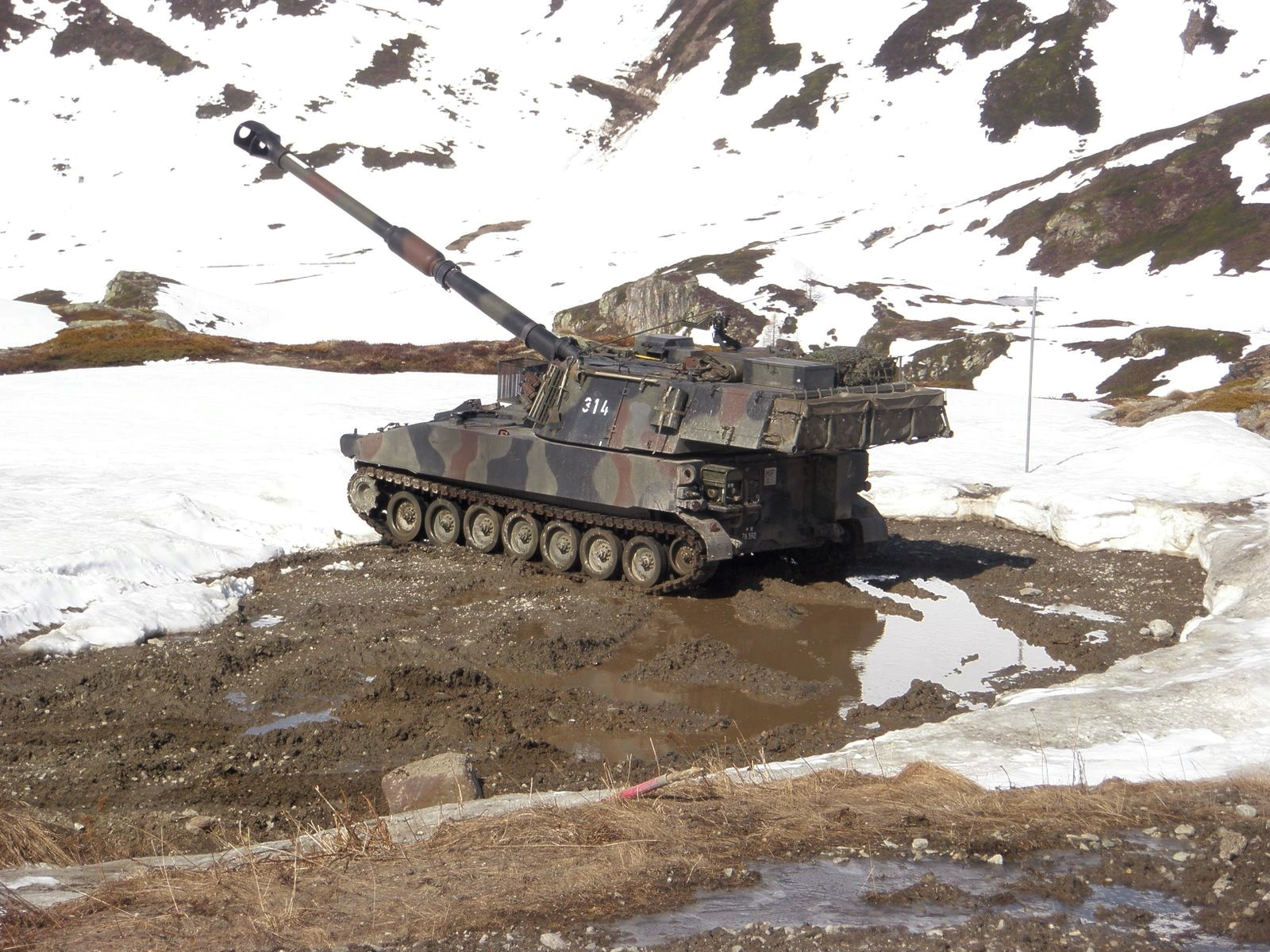
A Swiss M109 KAWEST howitzer in 2009

This Swiss improved version produced by RUAG incorporates a new Swiss-designed L47 155 mm gun with an increased firing range of up to 36 km. It features an inertial navigation system coupled with a new gun-laying system, along with an ammunition storage increase of 40 rounds and 64 charges. The KAWEST (lit. Kampfwertsteigerung = upgrade of combat capabilities) requires only six crew members instead of eight. It is able to fire three-round bursts within 15 seconds, or maintain a constant firing rate of over one round per minute.

Upgraded Swiss PzHb (Panzerhaubitze)74, 79 and 88 (M109A1B) are known as respectively PzHb 74/95, PzHb 79/95 and PzHb 88/95.

- 33 of the 120 PzHb 74 were modernized to the standard PzHb 74/95 KAWEST.
- 207 of the 207 PzHb 79 were modernized to the standard PzHb 79/95 KAWEST.
- 108 of the 108 PzHb 88 were modernized to the standard PzHb 88/95 KAWEST.

=== M109A3GNM ===
The latest version in service with the Norwegian Army's Artilleribataljonen.

In 2006, there were 56 M109A3GNs in the Army's inventory, meaning that at least 70 SPGs had been scrapped after the end of the Cold War. 14 of the M109A3GNs received upgrades in 2007, and were designated M109A3GNM. The upgrade includes a new intercom and new navigation and positioning systems.

In 2020 the 14 units with A3GNM upgrades and those still with A3GN specs were placed in storage because all the new Korean K9 Thunder units had been delivered. In May 2022, Norway donated 22 A3GN-spec M109s to Ukraine. Two M109A3GN howitzers were destroyed and three damaged during the 2022 Russian invasion of Ukraine.

=== M109 KAWEST WE ===
Improvement of the Swiss Kawest variant, 133 in total were brought up to this standard:

- 25 of the 207 PzHb 79/95 were modernized to the standard PzHb KAWEST WE. Those are currently in service.
- 108 of the 108 PzHb 88/95 were modernized to the standard PzHb KAWEST WE. Those are currently in service.

=== K55A1 ===
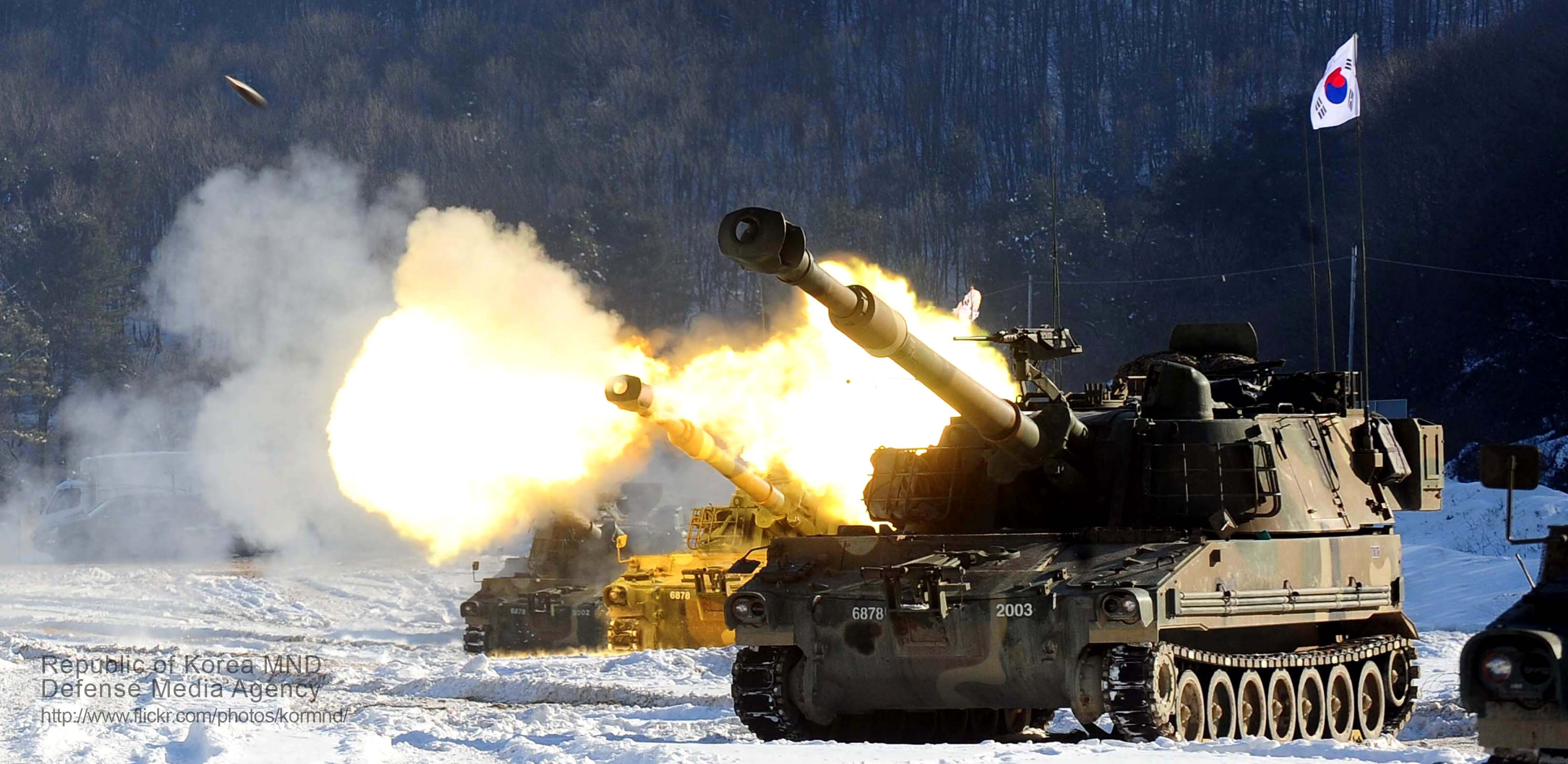
K55A1 howitzers firing on an exercise in 2013

The K55A1 is a South Korean overhaul and modernization of the K55, augmenting the proven systems of the K9 Thunder and the K9A1. The development took three years between 2007 and 2010. The upgrade started in 2010. In November 2010, in the wake of the North Korean artillery attack, the South Korean government authorized a massive increase in military spending. South Korea allocated 11.5 billion KRW on K55A1 upgrades for FY2011, more than a 1500% increase from 700 million KRW for FY2010. The upgrade was performed by Samsung Techwin, and the first vehicle was fielded by the South Korean Army in early 2011.

The K55A1 is fitted with the same electronics and fire control system as the K9. The self-propelled gun has significantly enhanced field operability and accuracy through the installation of Honeywell Aerospace's TALIN 5000 INS (inertial navigation system), a satellite navigation device (GPS), and a speed calibrator. As a result, the vehicle automatically lays the gun in the desired direction and delivers a first round within 45 seconds between stops, or 75 seconds between maneuvers after receiving the shooting specification, which required 2 minutes and 11 minutes, respectively, on the K55.

With the help of a new semi-autoloader, while charges are still inserted manually, the howitzer can fire 4 rounds per minute, increased from 2 to 3 rounds per minute. The improved suspension, involving a strut-type hydropneumatic buffer from Mottrol Co, Ltd., along with an enhanced chamber, allowed the vehicle to shoot K307 and K310 ammunition designed for K9 platform without laying spades at a maximum distance of 32 km. An APU (auxiliary power unit) was installed to operate the howitzer without turning on the main engine.

The Army Consolidated Maintenance Depot joined the K55A1 upgrade, releasing its first results in December 2013. The upgrade cost 20% of the K9 Thunder, 800 million KRW, as of 2021. The K55A1 upgrade program was completed in December 2022.

=== M109A7 ===
M109A7 Paladin with 1st Battalion, 82nd Field Artillery Regiment, 1st Cavalry Division, at Fort Hood, Texas, September 2026

The newest M109 version for U.S. service is the M109A7, formerly known as the M109A6 Paladin Integrated Management (PIM). The M109A7 shares common chassis components with the Bradley Fighting Vehicle (BFV) such as the engine, transmission, and tracks. Roadwheels have been reduced to 6 pairs. This creates commonality with other systems and maximizes cost savings in production, parts inventory, and maintenance personnel. The M109A7's 600-volt onboard power system harnesses technologies originally developed for the XM1203 non-line-of-sight cannon, including the electric turret drives and electric gun rammer.

The electric drive is faster than the previous hydraulic system, and the automatic rammer more consistently rams the round into the gun for consistent velocities and better accuracy. The updated power system was intended to "accommodate emerging networking technologies as they become ready" including "automation or electronic packages". The M109A7 can sustain a one-round per-minute rate of fire and a maximum rate of fire of four rounds per minute. Weighing 78,000 lb (35,000 kg), the M109A7 is 10,000 lb (4,500 kg) heavier than its predecessor, and it has the capacity to grow to 110,000 lb (50,000 kg). Even with the weight increase, the M109A7 can travel faster than previous versions at 38 mph (61 km/h) and is more maneuverable than a BFV.

"Weapons of the Field Artillery" (1966).

Prototypes of the vehicle underwent government testing in preparation for a Low-Rate Initial Production (LRIP) decision. The testing included RAM, mission and ballistic hull and turret testing. The M109A7 was slated to begin LRIP by 2013. The U.S. Army planned on procuring a fleet of 580 sets of M109A7 howitzers and M992A3 field artillery ammunition supply vehicles.

In October 2013, the Defense Acquisition Board approved the decision to start M109A7 production. The FY 2014 budget called for $340.8 million in Paladin funding, which would be two dozen vehicle sets at $14.4 million per vehicle. The Army plans to buy 133 vehicles, in 66 one-half vehicle sets starting in 2014. One M109A7 howitzer and two supporting M992A3 ammunition carriers will be destroyed during tests. A Full-Rate Production (FRP) decision was planned for February 2017.

In October 2013, BAE received a $668 million contract to begin LRIP of the M109A7. The first M109A6 and M992A2 vehicles were rebuilt to M109A7 and M992A3 standards as part of LRIP beginning in summer 2014. LRIP deliveries began in April 2015. The contract for FRP was signed in December 2017, with 48 vehicles slated for construction. The Army plans to upgrade 689 Paladins to A7-standard.

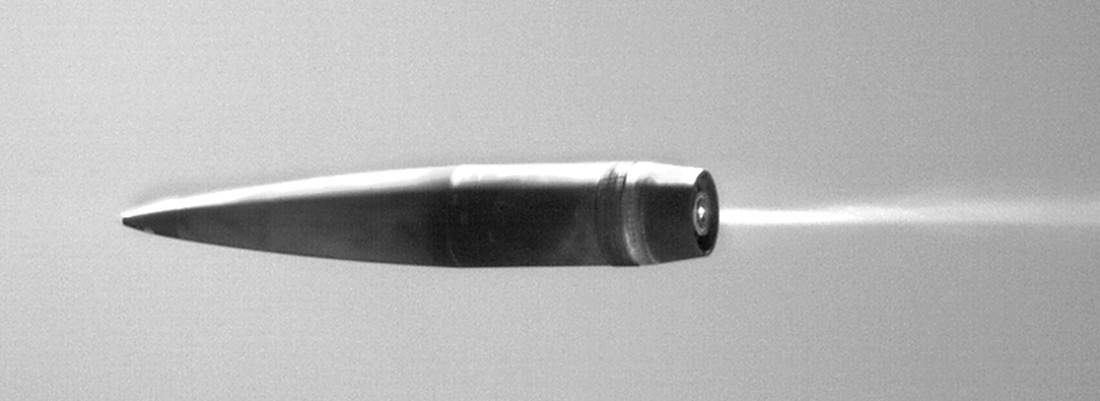
An XM1113 extended range artillery round, shown here at a range demonstration, uses a rocket-assist motor

The Army is looking to increase the capabilities of the M109A7. By introducing the new XM1113 Rocket-Assisted Projectile (RAP), it can reach 40 km (25 mi) from the current 39-caliber barrel. An additional XM1113 improvement over the legacy RAP round is the replacement of the high explosive, TNT, with an insensitive munition that is less volatile and less prone to unplanned detonation. The Army is working on an autoloader called the Extended Range Cannon Artillery (ERCA) to increase the sustained rate of fire to 6–10 rounds per minute.

Another part of the effort is the use of a new supercharged propellant to fire the shells, which required redesigning the howitzer to handle higher pressures.

The Army canceled deployment of the ERCA program in March 2024, citing engineering challenges such as excessive barrel wear.

==== Hypervelocity projectile (HVP) ====
In January 2016, the U.S. Army test-fired hypervelocity projectiles originally designed for use by U.S. Navy electromagnetic railguns. They found that they significantly increased the gun's range. The Army is looking into using the M109 Paladin firing the HVP for ballistic missile defense, as traditional missile interceptors are expensive, and gun-based missile defense used for point defense would use artillery at a much lower cost per round.

The HVP is capable of being fired out to 50 nautical miles (58 mi; 93 km) from a conventional cannon. It weighs 68 lb (31 kg) with a 46 lb (21 kg) flight body containing its guidance and warhead—less powerful, but more agile to hit small, high-speed targets. Modifications will be needed for the Paladin to effectively shoot the HVP, possibly including different propellant to achieve higher velocities, automated reloading systems to fire quickly enough to defeat salvo launches, improved barrel life, and a new fire control and sensor system. During a test of the Air Force's Advanced Battle Management System (ABMS) in September 2020, an HVP fired from an Army Paladin howitzer successfully intercepted a BQM-167 target drone simulating a cruise missile.

HVP was renamed to gun-launched guided projectile (GLGP), canceled in the 2022 budget, and tests continued in 2023.

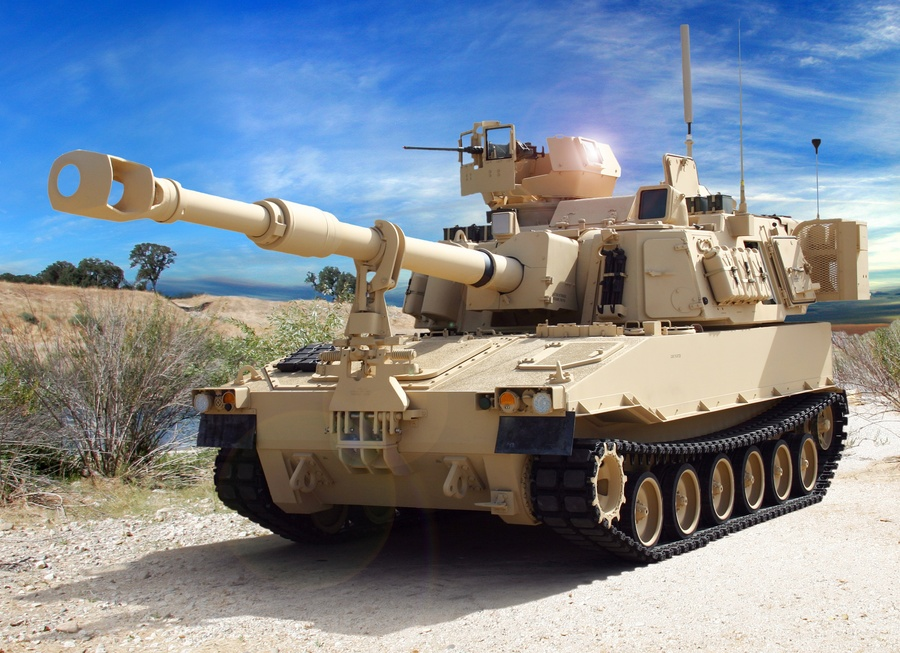
A prototype M109A7

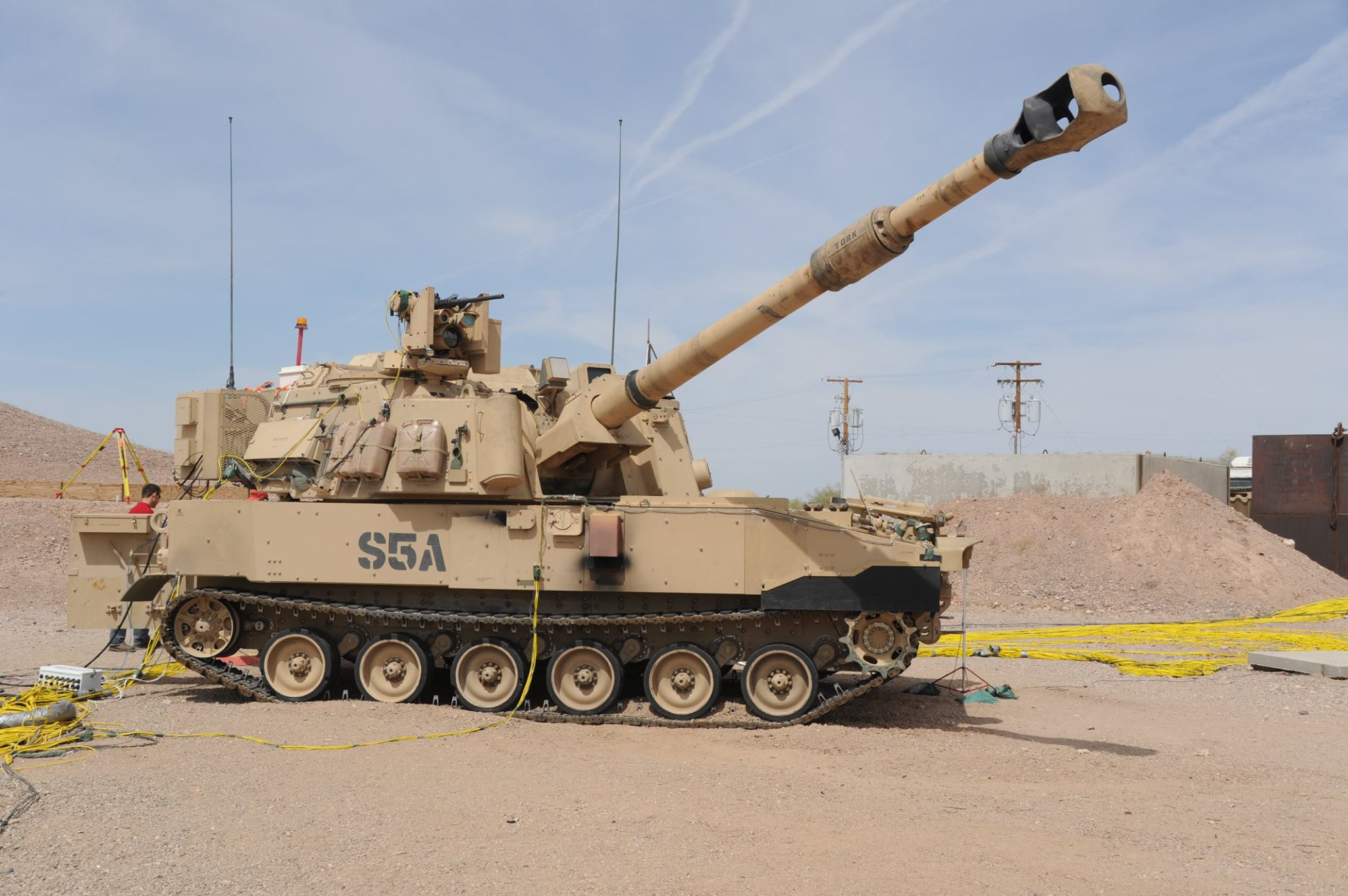
A M109A7 155 mm SPH being tested at Yuma Proving Ground, Arizona

=== Experimental vehicles ===
==== P-52 ====
The P-52 was a 52-caliber variant of M109A6 Paladin offered to South Korea by BMY Combat Systems in 1992. It was rejected by South Korea in favor of K9 Thunder. Proposal stage only.

==== M109L52 ====
Jointly developed by the Dutch firm RDM and the German firm Rheinmetall, the M109L52 was first revealed in 2002. The main improvement was replacing the M126 series gun with the longer 52-caliber cannon from the PzH 2000, thus the MTLS ammunition of the PzH 2000 can be used. Improvements to the loading system were also made, resulting in an increased rate of fire from 3 rds/min to 9–10 rds/min, able to be sustained for up to 2 minutes. A total of 35 rounds can be carried.

==== M109-52 ====
The M109-52 is a 52-caliber variant of M109 developed by BAE Systems by integrating Rheinmetall L52 cannon.

==== M1299 ====
The M1299 was a prototype self-propelled howitzer developed by BAE Systems in 2019 under the Extended Range Cannon Artillery (ERCA) program. It was based on the M109A7, and was primarily designed for the purpose of improving the M109A7's effective range. One battalion of vehicles is planned to begin a year-long operational assessment in 2023. It was expected to be fitted with an autoloader, which would have increased its rate of fire from 3 to 10 rounds per minute. The M1299 was cancelled in March 2024 due, at least in part, to excessive barrel wear. Advanced ammunition developed for the M1299 will continue development, and the U.S. Army will look for existing alternatives to fulfil its re-evaluated long-range fire support needs.

== Derivatives ==
=== M992 ===
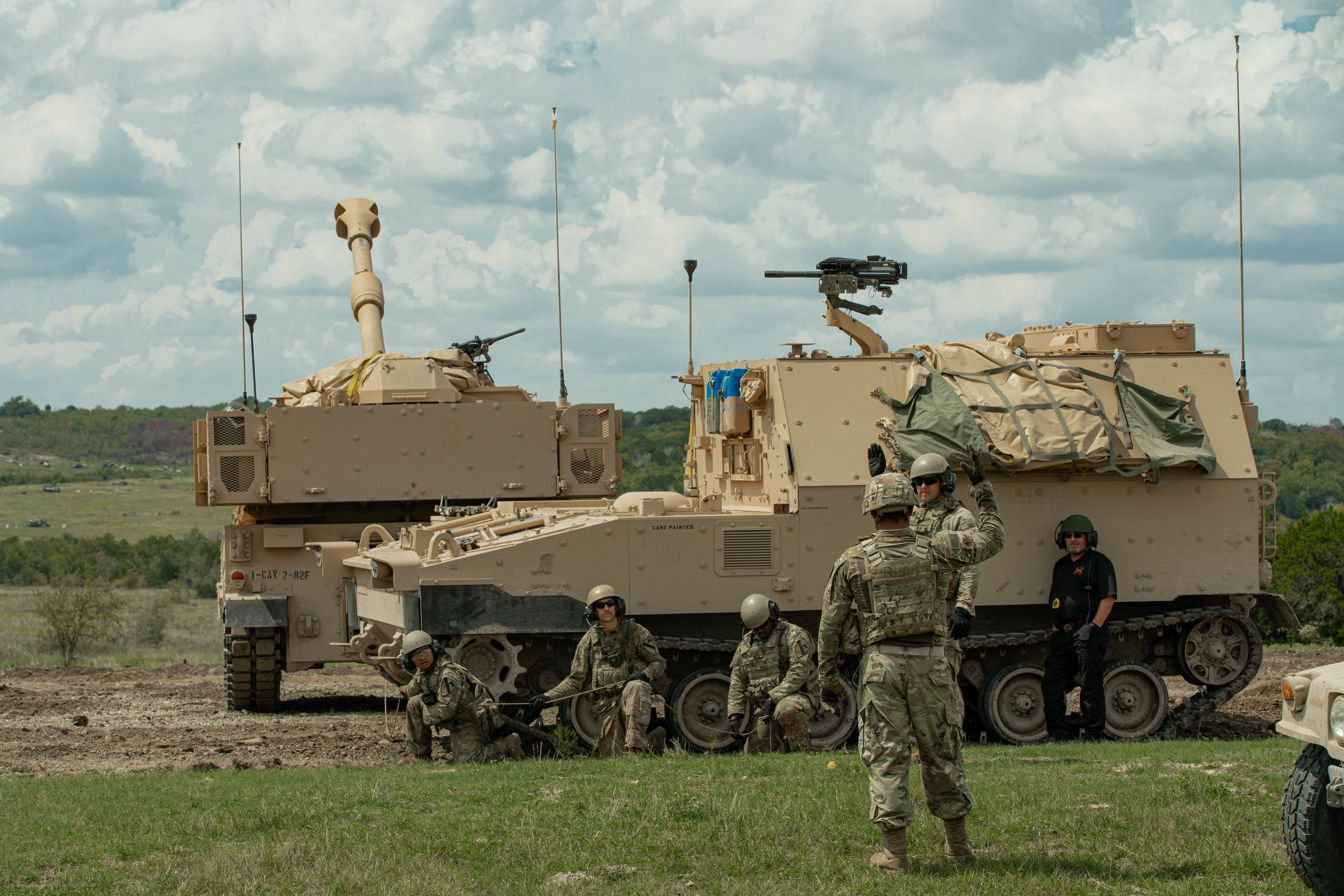
An M992A3 FAASV

The M992 field artillery ammunition supply vehicle (FAASV) is built on the chassis of the M109. It replaced the M548. Unlike the M548, it is armored. This ammunition vehicle has no turret, but has a taller superstructure to store 93 rounds and an equivalent number of powders and primers.

This vehicle is fitted with a Halon fire suppression system and a weapons mount similar to that on the M109 turret, usually mounting a Mk 19 grenade launcher for local defense against infantry and light armored vehicles.

The vehicle contains a 2-stroke diesel powered auxiliary power unit that can power all non-automotive energy requirements on the FAASV and on the M109.

=== K66 ===
The K66 was a planned ammunition support vehicle for the K55. As a follow-up to the K55 program, Samsung Aerospace Industries prepared for licensing a local variant of the M992, featuring such modifications as NBC protection and an increase of ammunition storage capacity to 110 rounds, 116 packs of powders, and 132 primers.

In 1987, Samsung Aerospace Industries competed against the Daewoo Heavy Industries' ammunition support vehicle based on the K200 APC. Daewoo Heavy Industries' vehicle was selected as the K66, but failed the test evaluation. The K66 project was cancelled in the mid-1990s, resulting in a lawsuit.

=== K77 FDCV (fire direction center vehicle) ===
The K77 FDCV is a command & control post vehicle variant based on the K55 platform.

=== K56 ARV (ammunition resupply vehicle) ===
The K56 ARV is an ammunition resupply vehicle based on the K55 platform. Unlike the K10 ARV, the K56 can resupply both the K55A1 and the K9 Thunder. It has a 45.7% (4,197 out of 9,191 total parts) compatibility with the K55A1.

After 10 months of pilot experiment, the K56 program was authorized by the DAPPC (Defense Acquisition Program Promotion Committee) in February 2007. In May 2007, the DAPPC allocated 16 billion KRW for research and development for 2008 to 2010, with plans to produce 520 vehicles between 2011 and 2020. In June 2008, Samsung Techwin was selected as the main contractor for the project. Later, the development completion schedule was delayed to 2011, while the total production amount was increased to 700 vehicles with a cost of 1.3 trillion KRW between 2012 and 2021.

In September 2010, the Board of Audit and Inspection claimed that the Army was biased during evaluation, and demanded re-analysis of the project regarding inefficiency of the system. The Defense Acquisition Program Administration (DAPA) ignored the Board and continued with the project while the Army purposely delayed complying. In June 2011, the Ministry of Defense again ordered a reexamination of the resupply vehicle. DAPA instead requested a budget for the program, and the development was completed in October 2011. In July 2013, the DAPA announced the 1st production batch of the K56 between 2013 and 2015 for 65 billion KRW.

In December 2015, Hanwha Techwin signed a contract with the DAPA for a 2nd production batch. In January 2018, Hanwha Land Systems announced a 166.4 billion KRW contract with the DAPA for a 3rd production batch and related products. In June 2020, Hanwha Defense announced 380.3 billion KRW contract with the DAPA for a 4th production batch. South Korea plans a 5th production batch and to achieve full operational capability by 2025. All K56s were delivered to the western front.

=== Training systems ===
The US Army uses the fire support combined arms tactical trainer (FSCATT) in two versions, for initial and sustainment training of the M109A6 and M109A5. The system uses an actual surplus turret and a simulated ammunition system.

The Swiss Army uses a highly advanced KAWEST trainer from Van Halteren Metaal of the Netherlands.

The Dutch, Belgian, Thai, and Israeli armies have various configurations of the Van Halteren Metaal M109 Howitzer Crew Trainer (HCT).

The US Army PEO STRI had a program called M109A7 Howitzer Crew Trainer (HCT). The plan was to procure 16 systems beginning in the 3rd Quarter of FY 20.

== Successors ==
The U.S. Army sought to replace the M109 with the XM2001 Crusader, initially part of the Armored Systems Modernization program. The program was canceled in May 2002 amid criticism that the program was not in line with the Army's long-term plans for lighter armored brigades. Funding was redirected to the Future Combat Systems Manned Ground Vehicles program, which produced the 18-ton XM1203 non-line-of-sight cannon as the program's lead effort. The Pentagon terminated the MGV program in 2009 due to concerns over its affordability. The U.S. Army's M1299 howitzer was planned to be completed in 2021 and was to undergo operational assessment in 2023. Due to issues with excessive wear on its barrel, the project was cancelled in April 2024. Sometime after, the U.S. Army initiated the Next Generation Howitzer (NGH) program utilizing studies and tests from the ERCA program, with the U.S. Army requesting $8 million for NGH RDT&E for FY2025.

== Operators ==
=== Current ===
==== M109A1 ====
- Djibouti − 10 M109L as of 2024, former Italian vehicles
- Greece − 51 M109A1B in 2011. 418 M109A1B/A2/A3GEA1/A5 in service as of 2024
- Iraq − 6 M109A1 as of 2024
- Iran − 150+ M109A1 including Raad-2s in service as of 2024
- Jordan − 358 M109A1/A2 in service as of 2024
- Morocco − 36 M109A1B in 2011, ca. 130 M109A1/A1B/A2/A3/A4 in service as of 2024
- Saudi Arabia − 87 M109A1B in 2011, 110 M109A1B/A2 as of 2024

==== M109A2/A3/A3B ====
- Brazil − 37 M109A3 as of 2024, will be refurbished
- Chile − 24 M109A3 as of 2024
- Greece − 84 M109A2, 50 M109A3GE and 223 A3GEA2 in 2011. 418 M109A1B/A2/A3GEA1/A5 in service as of 2024
- Egypt − 164 M109A2 as of 2024
- Jordan − 108 M109A2 in 2011, 358 M109A1/A2 in service as of 2024
- Kuwait − 37 M109A3 as of 2024
- Lebanon − 12 M109A2 as of 2024
- Morocco − 3 M109A2 in 2011, ca. 130 M109A1/A1B/A2/A3/A4 in service as of 2024
- Pakistan − 200 A2 and 123 M109L as of 2024
- Peru − 12 M109A2 as of 2024
- Saudi Arabia − 24 in 2011, 110 M109A1B/A2 as of 2024
- Spain − 6 M109A2 used by the Marine Infantry as of 2024
- Taiwan − 197 M109A2 in 2011, 225 M109A2/A5 as of 2024
- Ukraine − 23 M109A3GN and 60 M109L delivered between 2022 and 2023. 90 M109A3GN/A4/A5Öe/A6/L in service as of 2024
- United Arab Emirates − 85 M109A3 as of 2024

==== M109A4 ====
- Indonesia − 36 M109A4 as of 2024
- Morocco − ca. 130 M109A1/A1B/A2/A3/A4 in service as of 2024
- Ukraine − 28 M109A4BE delivered in 2022. 90 M109A3GN/A4/A5Öe/A6/L in service as of 2024

==== M109A5 ====
- Austria − 48 M109A5Öe as of 2024
- Bahrain − 20 M109A5 as of 2024
- Brazil − 40 M109A5 and 32 M109A5+ as of 2024
- Chile − 24 M109A5+ as of 2024
- Greece − 12 M109A5 in 2011. 418 M109A1B/A2/A3GEA1/A5 in service as of 2024
- Egypt − 204 M109A5 as of 2024
- Iraq − 24 M109A5 as of 2024
- Israel − 250 M109A5 as of 2024
- Latvia − 59 M109A5Öe as of 2024
- Lebanon − 24 M109A5 as of 2024
- Morocco − 70 M109A5 as of 2024
- Pakistan − ca. 115 M109A5 as of 2024
- Portugal − 18 M109A5 as of 2024
- Spain − 95 M109A5 as of 2024
- Taiwan − 28 M109A5 in 2011, 225 M109A2/A5 as of 2024
- Thailand − 20 M109A5 as of 2024
- Ukraine − 6 M109A5Öe delivered in 2022. 90 M109A3GN/A4/A5Öe/A6/L in service as of 2024

==== M109A6 Paladin ====
- United States − Estimated 370 M109A6 in service, ca. 850 M109A6 in storage as of January 2025
- Ukraine − 18 M109A6s delivered in 2023. 90 M109A3GN/A4/A5Öe/A6/L in service as of 2024

==== M109A7 ====
- United States − Estimated 300 M109A7 as of January 2025
- Taiwan − 60 ordered

==== KAWEST/KAWEST WE ====
- Switzerland − 133 M109 KAWEST WE as of 2024

==== K55A1 ====
- Republic of Korea − 1,180 K55A1 in service with the Army and the Marine Corps.

=== Potential ===
- Saudi Arabia − 177 M109A6 ordered in April 2018

=== Former ===
==== M109 ====
- Ethiopia: Received 12 (possibly second-hand) from the United States in 1975, it was estimated in 1989 to have 6 in service
- Libya − 14 in 2011
- Libya Dawn − At least one was used against Islamic State forces in Sirte in late 2016
- Switzerland: Purchased 146 M109 (Pz Hb 66) and introduced from 1971 All vehicles were upgraded to M109A1B (Pz Hb 66/74) from 1977 to 1979.

==== M109A1/A1B ====
- Switzerland: Purchased M109A1B and introduced them in 3 batches: 120 Pz Hb 74 from 1974 to 1978, 207 Pz Hb 79 from 1981 to 1983, and 108 Pz Hb 88 from 1991 to 1992. Also upgraded 146 M109 to M109A1B standard from 1977 to 1979. The total number of received vehicles is 581

==== M109A2/A3/A3B ====
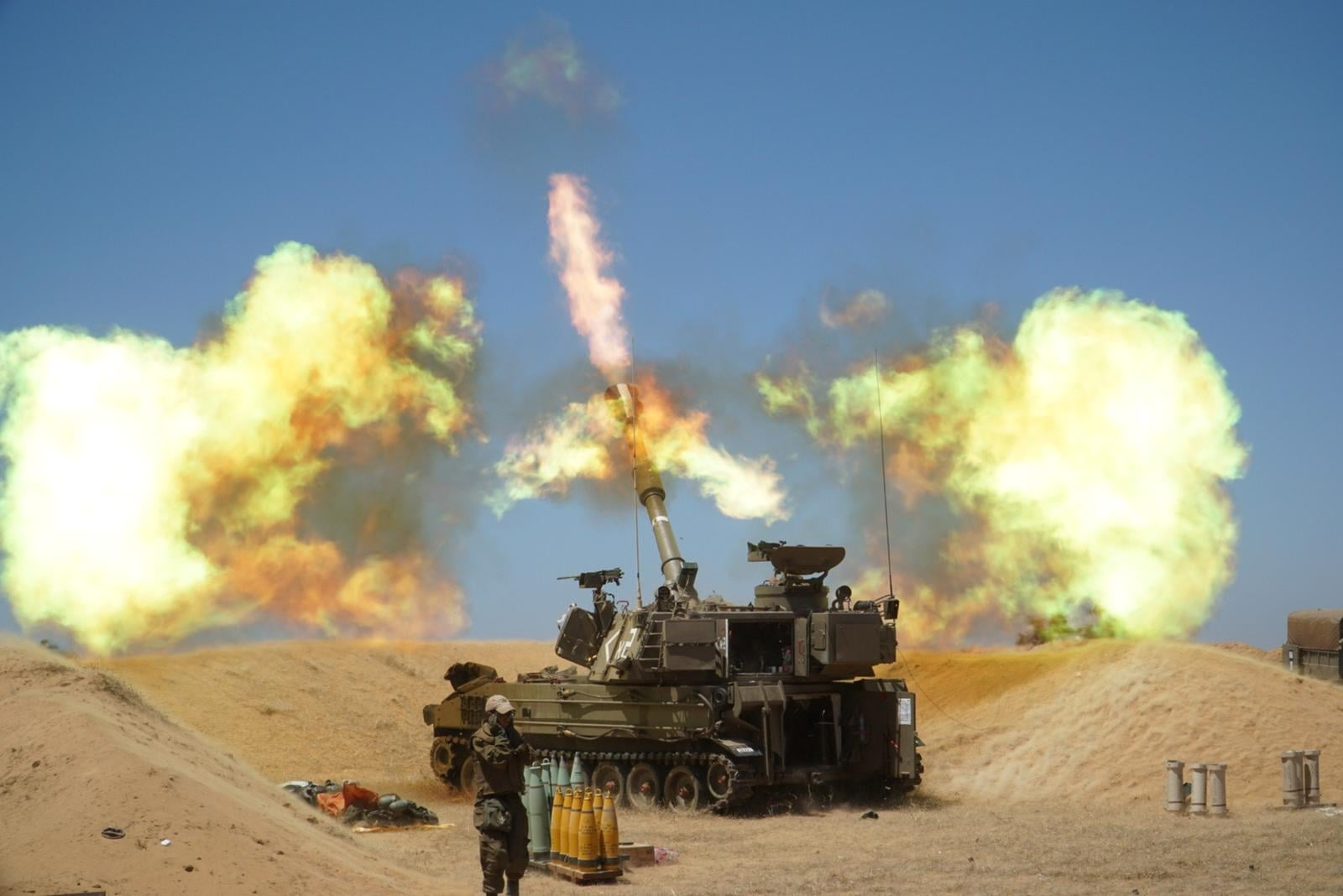
Israeli M109 used to bombard the Gaza Strip

- Belgium − 167 A2, of which 64 were upgraded to the -A4BE standard, 31 sold to Brazil (1999–2001), 43 sold to Morocco (2008), the remainder sold to private companies in 2015
- Denmark − 2–6 (upgraded to M109 A3DK, used to be 76)
- Germany − 570 A3GE A1/A2, phased out by 1 July 2007 and replaced by the PzH 2000
- Israel − 30 M109A2 in storage as of 2024
- Italy − 221 M109L (M109 modernized to A3 equivalent with Italian-made 155 mm/39 calibre barrels), replaced by the PzH 2000
- Netherlands − 126 as of 1998, replaced by the PzH 2000, 5 sold to Austria (1997), 87 to United Arab Emirates (1997), 121 to Jordan (2011–2012). It is speculated that some remaining M109A2s might have been donated to Ukraine during the Russian invasion of Ukraine.
- Norway − 33 in storage after donation of 22 to Ukraine in 2022. 55 in storage in 2021. Replaced by the K9 Thunder
- Portugal − 6 M109A2 replaced by 18 M109A5
- Republic of Korea − 1,180 K55 were produced by Samsung Aerospace Industries between 1985 and 1996. All vehicles were upgraded to K55A1 and delivered from 2011 to 2022
- United Kingdom − 140+ entered service in 1965, upgraded to -A1 and -A2 standards, 83 sold to Austria in 1994 (51 A2, 32 A3)

==== M109A4 ====
- Belgium − 64 A4BE of which 36 A4BE sold to Indonesia (2017–2018), the others to private companies in 2015. From these 28 units were bought by the UK to be delivered to Ukraine.
- Canada − 76 A4B+. Used by the Canadian Forces from 1967 until 2005, when they were phased out. All the vehicles had been modernized to the M109A4B+ SPH standard in the 1980s. They were primarily used by the 4 Canadian Mechanized Brigade Group in Germany

==== M109A5 ====
- Saudi Arabia − 48 second-hand M109A5 delivered between 2002 and 2004. None remained in service by 2011

== International equivalents ==
- 2S3 Akatsiya – (Soviet Union)
- 2S19 Msta-S – (Soviet Union, Russia)
- 2S35 Koalitsiya-SV – (Russia)
- AHS Krab – (Poland)
- Panzerhaubitze 2000 – (Germany)
- AMX-30 AuF1 – (France)
- AS-90 – (United Kingdom)
- K9 Thunder – (South Korea)
- 152 mm SpGH DANA – (Czechoslovakia)
- Type 75 · Type 99 – (Japan)
- Palmaria – (Italy)
- PLZ-05 – (China)
- Raad-2 – (Iran)
- Sholef – (Israel) prototype
- 15,5 cm bandkanon 1 – (Sweden)
- ZUZANA – (Slovakia)

== See also ==
- List of self-propelled howitzers
- List of artillery
- List of land vehicles of the U.S. Armed Forces
- M107 standard 155 mm High Explosive (HE) projectile
- M549 HE Rocket Assisted (HERA) projectile
- M864 Dual-Purpose Improved Conventional Munition (DPICM)
- M795, a more lethal, longer range version of the M107 HE projectile
- M109 in the Swiss Armed Forces, the full status of the modernisation and sales of the 581 M109 purchased by the Swiss Army

== Bibliography ==
- Foss, Christopher F, ed. (1979). Jane's Armour and Artillery 1979–80 (1st ed.). London: Jane's Publishing Company. ISBN 0-354-00588-X.
- Foss, Christopher F, ed. (2011). Jane's Armour and Artillery 2011–2012 (32nd ed.). Surrey: Janes Information Group. ISBN 978-0-71062-960-9.
- International Institute for Strategic Studies (2024). The Military Balance 2024. Taylor & Francis. ISBN 978-1-040-05115-3.
