= BAE Systems Inc. =

American defense contractor

Coordinates: 39°05′41″N 77°10′43″W

- Type: Subsidiary
- Industry: Aerospace and Defense
- Predecessors: Tracor, Inc.
- Founded: 30 November 1999; 26 years ago
- Founders: D. Van Holliday, Frank W. McBee, Chester McKinney, Jess Stanbrough, Harry Pollard, and machinist Byron Grisham, Jr
- Headquarters: Falls Church, Virginia, U.S.
- Key people: Tom Arseneault (president & CEO)
- Products: Civil and military aerospace, naval vessels, munitions, land warfare systems, others
- Revenue: ▲$18.6 billion (2025)
- Number of employees: 45,500 (2025)
- Parent: BAE Systems plc
- Subsidiaries: BAE Systems Electronic Systems; BAE Systems Platforms & Services; Intelligence & Security
- Website: baesystems.com

BAE Systems Inc. (formerly BAE Systems North America) is an American company operating as an independent subsidiary of British multinational defense, security, and aerospace company BAE Systems plc. The American subsidiary operates under a Special Security Agreement which allows it to work on some of the most sensitive United States defense programs despite its foreign ownership. It is incorporated in Delaware. It employs approximately 35,000 workers within U.S. borders and several thousand more in Israel, South Africa, Sweden and the United Kingdom. Major business lines of BAE Systems Inc. include electronic warfare, sensing and communications equipment; armored vehicles, artillery systems; naval guns and naval ship repair; and cybersecurity and intelligence services.

Generating annual sales nearing $13.6 billion, BAE Systems Inc. contributes almost half of the parent company's global revenues and is typically ranked among the Pentagon's top-10 suppliers. It operates under a Special Security Agreement with a separate board of directors from the London-based parent to assure the protection of sensitive information concerning the U.S. programs in which it is engaged. Because it consists largely of legacy American enterprises, BAE Systems Inc. has more involvement in such programs than any other foreign-owned company.

BAE Systems Inc. is led by president and chief executive officer Tom Arseneault, and is headquartered in Falls Church, Virginia. It maintains operating locations in 38 states, with especially large concentrations in the Northeastern and Southeastern regions of the U.S. The enterprise holds over 2,000 patents and is a dominant player in many of the markets it addresses. For example, it builds the electronic-warfare systems for the tri-service F-35 fighter; it produces all of the vehicles in U.S. Army's Armored Brigade Combat Teams except the Abrams tank; and it is the biggest provider of ship repair services to the US Navy.

== History ==
The company was created on November 30, 1999 through the merging of Marconi Electronic Systems (MES) and British Aerospace (BAe) to form BAE Systems. Their respective subsidiaries in the USA, Marconi North America and British Aerospace North America, were similarly merged to form BAE Systems North America.

BAE Systems' 2003 Annual Report stated "in recent years BAE Systems has undergone a... transformation from a UK-based aircraft manufacturer to a broadly-based systems business. Through this transformation the company has achieved a more balanced portfolio and geographic spread."

BAE Systems North America was renamed BAE Systems Inc. in 2005 following a major reorganization of BAE Systems plc as a result of the SELEX Sistemi Integrati and United Defense Industries transactions.

=== Expansion ===
BAE has described the rationale for expansion in the US; "[it] is by far the largest defense market with spend running close to twice that of the Western European nations combined. Importantly, US investment in research and development is significantly higher than in Western Europe." When Dick Olver was appointed Chairman in July 2004 he ordered a review of the company's businesses which ruled out further European acquisitions or joint ventures and confirmed a "strategic bias" for expansion and investment in the U.S.

In 1999, the most significant part of the newly created BAE Systems North America was Tracor, which was acquired after its sale to the company's subsidiary, Marconi North America, in 1998. These two companies generated $2.5 billion in sales to the US Department of Defense in the same year. Since 1999, almost all of BAE Systems' growth has been concentrated in the U.S. BAE Systems North America has grown to the point where its sales to the U.S. Department of Defense have surpassed those of its parent to the UK Ministry of Defence. BAE Systems is now by far the largest foreign investor in the US defense industry. With BAE's comprehensive military agreement with the US government and the political and military ties that exist between the US and the UK, BAE Systems has faced little opposition to acquisitions of important US defense contractors. In April 2000, BAE purchased Lockheed Martin Control Systems (LMCS), a manufacturer of electronic controls for aircraft, space vehicles and the transportation industry for US$510 million. LMCS was renamed BAE Systems Platform Solutions. In November 2000 BAE Systems purchased Lockheed Martin Aerospace Electronic Systems, a defense systems company which encompassed Sanders, Fairchild Systems and Lockheed Martin Space Electronics & Communications. Following an internal reorganization the division became BAE Systems Electronics & Integrated Solutions (E&IS). This acquisition was described by John Hamre, CEO of the Center for Strategic and International Studies and former Deputy Secretary of Defense, as "precedent setting" given the advanced and classified nature of many of that company's products.

In December 2002 BAE Systems completed its acquisition of Condor Pacific, Inc. for $58.5 million. Condor Pacific was a manufacturer of sensors and guidance systems for the aerospace industry.

In 2003 BAE Systems acquired Advanced Power Technologies, Inc (APTI), a data exploitation company and provider of communications and networking solutions, for $27 million. APTI was merged into E&IS. In March 2003 BAE Systems acquired MEVATEC, a provider of "professional technical services", which was renamed BAE Systems Analytical & Ordnance Solutions.

In 2004 BAE Systems purchased STI Government Systems, a provider of "photonics, information technologies, system integration ...and a variety of services to other government agencies in areas such as pollution mapping and search and rescue." STI is now part of the CNIR division of BAE Systems E&IS. In August 2004 BAE Systems acquired Boeing Commercial Electronics (now part of the Platform Solutions unit of BAE Systems E&IS). In September 2004 BAE announced the acquisition of the technology company DigitalNet Holdings Inc. The deal was completed on October 25, 2004 for approximately $600 million and the company was merged into the newly created BAE Systems Information Technology. Also in September 2004 BAE announced it was to acquire ALPHATECH, a Massachusetts-based image and signal processing company. ALPHATECH was renamed BAE Systems Advanced Information Technologies.

On March 7, 2005 BAE announced the acquisition of United Defense a major manufacturer of combat vehicles, artillery and naval guns. The acquisition received regulatory approval from the Committee on Foreign Investment in the United States on April 18, 2005 and was completed on June 24. United Defense was merged into the newly created BAE Systems Land & Armaments operating group.

BAE Systems announced the purchase of Armor Holdings, a Florida-based manufacturer of military, law enforcement and personnel safety equipment on May 7, 2007. The company was a manufacturer of diversified products for the military, law enforcement, and personnel safety markets. Following regulatory and shareholder approval, the acquisition was completed on July 31, 2007 for approximately $4.532 billion. BAE has received large contracts as a result of the UDI and Armor Holdings acquisitions; for example $1.1bn worth of refurbishment and upgrading work, an order in January 2008 for medium mine-protected vehicles (MMPVs) which could earn up to $2.3bn, and a $2.24bn contract for mine-resistant ambush-protected (MRAP) vehicles in December 2007.

On December 12, 2007, BAE announced the acquisition of Dayton, Ohio-based MTC Technologies. The purchase was finalized in June 2008.

On February 16, 2024, BAE announced the completion of its acquisition of Ball Aerospace from Ball Corporation, and the re-branding of that acquisition as BAE Space and Mission Systems (SMS), for a purchase price of $5.5 billion (U.S.). At the time of the acquisition, approximately 5,200 employees were transferred from the former Ball Aerospace to BAE SMS.

== Organization/Products ==
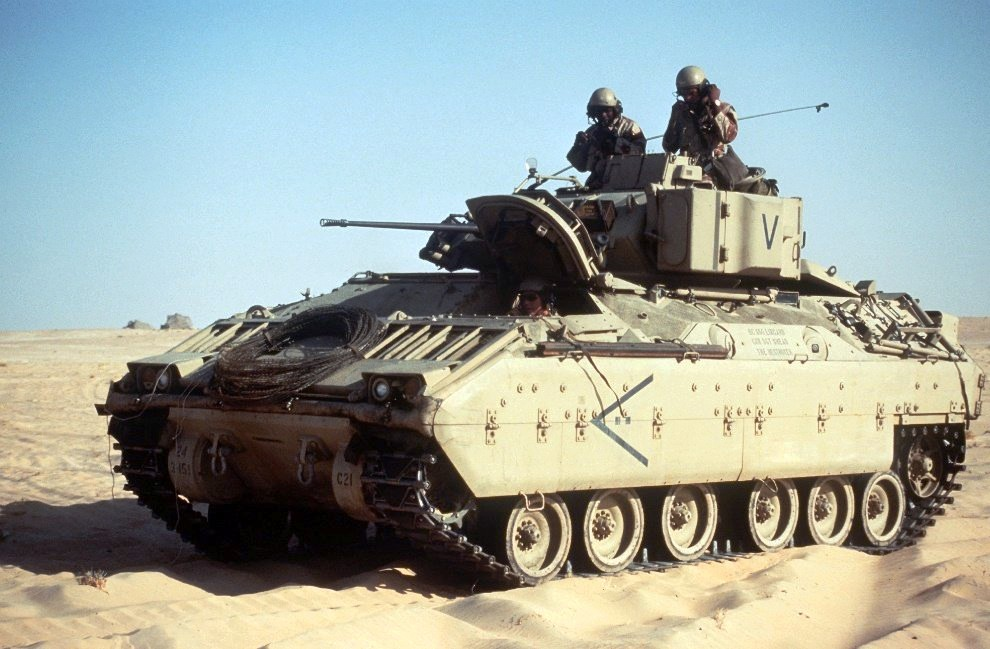
BAE's $4.2 billion purchase of United Defense in 2005 added the M2/M3 Bradley family of armored vehicles to its product line.

Electronic Systems
Electronic Systems produces commercial and defense electronics for flight and engine control, electronic warfare, surveillance, communications, and power and energy management.
Intelligence & Security
Systems engineering, integration, and support services.
Platforms & Services
Tracked and wheeled armored combat vehicles, naval guns, naval ship repair and modernization, artillery and missile launching systems, munitions and ordnance.

== Financial information ==
Yr ending	Turnover (£ million)	% of group turnover	EBITA (£m)	% of group EBITA	Ref.
2009	12,375	55.2%	1,178	53.1%	
2008	10,866	58.6%	1,072	56.5%	
2007	7,453	47.4%	741	50.2%	
2006	6,122	44.5%	597	49.5%	
2005	4,967	32.2%	366	31.0%	

== Corporate governance ==
BAE Systems Inc. is fully owned by BAE Systems plc.

Jerry DeMuro replaced Linda Hudson as appointed Chief Operating Officer, BAE Systems plc, and President and CEO of BAE Systems Inc. in January 2014. In December 2019, the company announced that Tom Arseneault would be named the new President and CEO, with DeMuro transitioning to a new role as executive vice president of Strategic Initiatives, while continuing to serve on the U.S. organization's Board of Directors.

As per its Special Security Arrangement, BAE Systems Inc. operates as a semi-autonomous business unit within BAE Systems controlled at a local level by American management. In May 2006 the CEO of BAE Systems described the "firewalled" status of BAE Systems Inc: "The British members of the corporate leadership, me included, get to see the financial results; but many areas of technology, product and programme are not visible to us.... The SSA effectively allows us to operate in the US as an American company, providing the highest levels of assurance and integrity in some of the most sensitive fields of national security provision."
