= Fairchild Systems =

- Company type: Subsidiary
- Industry: Defense contracting
- Predecessor: Fairchild Camera and Instrument
- Defunct: November 27, 2000
- Fate: Acquired by BAE Systems
- Successor: BAE Systems Electronics, Intelligence & Support
- Headquarters: United States
- Products: Defense electronics
- Parent: Fairchild Camera and Instrument (originally); Loral Corporation (1989–1996); Lockheed Martin (1996–2000); BAE Systems (2000–)

Fairchild Systems was a United States defense contractor which is now part of BAE Systems Electronics, Intelligence & Support. A descendant of Fairchild Camera and Instrument, the San Francisco Chronicle described Fairchild Systems as "one of the legendary names of Silicon Valley" and that in "the late 1960s, [its] Bay Area operations were the training ground for the engineers who went on to found Intel and other top semiconductor companies."

== History ==
Fairchild Weston Systems was acquired by Loral Corporation in mid-1989. The group was renamed as the Loral Fairchild Systems divisions of Loral Corp.

On 22 April 1996, Lockheed Martin completed the acquisition of Loral Corporation's defense electronics and system integration businesses, which included Fairchild, for $9.1 billion. The company became Lockheed Fairchild Systems.

In 2000, Lockheed Martin grouped Fairchild with Sanders Associates and Lockheed Martin Space Electronics & Communications under the Lockheed Martin Aerospace Electronic Systems division. BAE Systems agreed to acquire the division in July 2000 and completed its acquisition on 27 November.
