= Advanced Power Technologies =

American defense contractor

Advanced Power Technologies, Inc.
- Company type: Private
- Industry: Semiconductor
- Defunct: 2003; 23 years ago
- Fate: Acquired by BAE Systems Inc.
- Headquarters: Monaca, Pennsylvania, United States

Advanced Power Technologies, Inc. (APTI) was an American defense contractor which was acquired by BAE Systems Inc. in March 2003. It was renamed BAE Systems Advanced Technologies.

Aerospace Daily said APTI's "core competencies include radio frequency and optical engineering, communications, networking and signal and data exploitation. It also works on microwave engineering, antenna design and development, optical sensors, plasma and shock physics, advanced ordnance systems, non-destructive testing, signal and image processing and digital control systems."

== History ==
The company was founded by Atlantic Richfield Company (ARCO) as ARCO Advanced Technologies in the late 1980s in Monaca, Pennsylvania. In 1992, the company was involved in the High Frequency Active Auroral Research Project (HAARP) after this project was approved by the U.S. Congress in 1992. A year later, the U.S. Air Force announced that APTI would become the prime contractor of the program. It was acquired by E-Systems in June 1994 and renamed Advanced Power Technologies.

In 1995 E-Systems was itself acquired by Raytheon. In January 1998 APTI was de-merged in a management buy-out to become a private company.
