= BAE Systems Electronic Systems =

Subsidiary of BAE Systems

- Type: Division
- Industry: Aerospace & Defense
- Founded: 2005; 21 years ago
- Headquarters: Arlington, Virginia, United States
- Key people: Terry Crimmins (president)
- Products: Avionics; Electronic Warfare; Communications; Sensor systems Intelligence systems.
- Revenue: £4.6 billion (2020)
- Operating income: £0.65 billion (2020)
- Number of employees: 16,600 (2020)
- Parent: BAE Systems Inc.
- Website: www.baesystems.com

BAE Systems Electronic Systems (ES) is one of three operating groups of BAE Systems Inc., the North American subsidiary of the British global defence contractor BAE Systems PLC.

== History ==
BAE Systems acquired Lockheed Martin Aerospace Electronic Systems (AES) and Lockheed Martin Control Systems in 2000.

BAE Systems Electronic Systems was formed in June 2005 by an internal reorganisation of these businesses.

Lockheed had identified AES as a candidate for disposal following a strategic review in 1999. BAE Systems agreed to acquire the group in July and completed its acquisition of AES on 27 November 2000. The group encompassed Sanders Associates, Fairchild Systems and Lockheed Martin Space Electronics & Communications. The purchase of this group by BAE has been described as "precedent setting" given the advanced and classified nature of many of that company's products.

In August 2004, BAE acquired Boeing Commercial Electronics for $66 million (£36m). This was an Irving, Texas-based division of Boeing responsible for the manufacture of electronic components for the company's aircraft. Boeing announced the sale of the division in 2003 as part of a move to outsource component manufacture and "concentrate on the integration and final assembly of commercial aircraft." The Fort Worth Star Telegram said "Boeing has sought to sell several operations that it said are too narrowly focused and costly for the company to manage efficiently."

== Businesses ==
BAE Systems Electronic Systems reports its sales under the following headings, 86% of which were to military customers in 2020:

=== Electronic Combat ===
ES produces electronic warfare (EW) systems for combat aircraft, for example for the F-35 Lightning II.

=== C4ISR Systems ===
Military communications. This includes the Airborne Tactical Radio business acquired from Raytheon.

=== Precision Strike & Sensing ===
GPS products and weapon parts, for example seekers for THAAD missiles. The GPS business was expanded in 2020 by the $1.9 billion purchase of the Collins Aerospace military GPS division of United Technologies Corporation.

=== Countermeasure & Electromagnetic Attack ===
Missile warning systems and offensive electronic warfare systems on aircraft including the Lockheed EC-130H Compass Call.

=== Controls & Avionics ===
Full Authority Digital Engine Controls and Fly by wire controls. General Electric and Boeing are major customers for this unit.

=== Power & Propulsion ===
Hybrid and full electric drive systems for public transit, commercial truck, and military applications.
