= BAE Systems Platforms & Services =

British defence weapons manufacturer

BAE Systems Platforms & Services Inc.
- Type: Private (subsidiary of BAE Systems Inc)
- Industry: Defense
- Founded: 24 June 2005; 21 years ago
- Headquarters: Falls Church, Virginia, United States
- Key people: Jeremy Tondreault (President)
- Products: Military vehicles, artillery, naval guns, missile launchers and munitions
- Revenue: £6.7 billion (2009)
- Number of employees: 11,000 (2020)
- Parent: BAE Systems Inc.
- Website: Platforms & Services

BAE Systems Platforms & Services is a wholly owned subsidiary of BAE Systems Inc. and is a large provider of tracked and wheeled armored combat vehicles, naval guns, naval ship repair and modernization, artillery and missile launching systems, advanced precision strike munitions and ordnance, and other technologies for US and international customers.

It was created on 24 June 2005, following the completion of BAE Systems' acquisition of United Defense in 2004 and its merger with BAE Systems Land Systems. In 2007, BAE Systems acquired Armor Holdings adding to the size of Land & Armaments significantly.

Until April 2003, BAE Systems was a relatively small player in the land systems industry. As a result of the acquisitions, it is now one of the largest land systems defence contractors in the world.

== History ==
BAE Systems was formed in 1999 by the merger of British Aerospace (BAe) and Marconi Electronic Systems (MES). BAe's land systems business was RO Defence, a major manufacturer of explosives, ammunition and small arms. MES owned Vickers Shipbuilding and Engineering Ltd, manufacturer of the M777 howitzer.

In June 2003, BAE Systems outbid General Dynamics for Alvis plc, the UK's principal land systems business. What had seemed a certain win for the US company was stopped by BAE Systems' surprise move. It has been seen as an attempt to keep such a strong competitor at bay in BAE Systems' "backyard." Alvis and BAE RO Defence were merged as BAE Systems Land Systems. When Dick Olver was appointed chairman of BAE Systems in July 2003 he ordered a review of the company's businesses which confirmed the attractiveness of the land systems sector. This shift in strategy was described as "remarkable" by the Financial Times.

In March 2005, BAE Systems announced the $3.174 billion acquisition of United Defense Industries (UDI). UDI, a major competitor to General Dynamics, was primarily a land systems manufacturer, boosting BAE Systems' involvement in this sector and its sales in the important North American market. UDI manufactured combat vehicles, artillery systems, naval guns, missile launchers and precision guided munitions.

BAE Systems Land and Armaments was formed in June 2004 in a reorganisation of BAE's businesses. Land and Armaments, headquartered in the United States as part of BAE Systems Inc., took control of BAE's existing land systems businesses.

Land and Armaments has received regular contracts for the "reset" of Bradley armoured fighting vehicles. By August of the 2006 financial year BAE had received contracts totalling $477.9 million.

In July 2008, BAE failed to win the $1.06 billion MRAP All Terrain Vehicle (M-ATV) contract which will see 7,244 vehicles produced for the US Marine Corps. In September 2009, BAE lost a larger contract, the first stage of a multibillion-dollar follow-on order for up to 23,542 trucks as part of the Family of Medium Tactical Vehicles programme. Despite a successful appeal forcing the US Army to reevaluate the bids, Oshkosh Corporation was confirmed as the winner of the £2.3 billion contract in February 2010. BAE announced a £592 million writedown of the former Armor Holdings business as a result.

== Organization ==
=== Global Tactical Systems ===
Global Tactical Systems (GTS) was formed from the merger of Mobility & Protection Systems' Medium/Heavy Vehicle business (formerly Armor Holdings) and the BAE Systems Land Systems South Africa businesses.

=== US Combat Systems ===
The former United Defense business, BAE's US Combat Systems produces fighting vehicle platforms and armaments.

=== Global Combat Systems ===
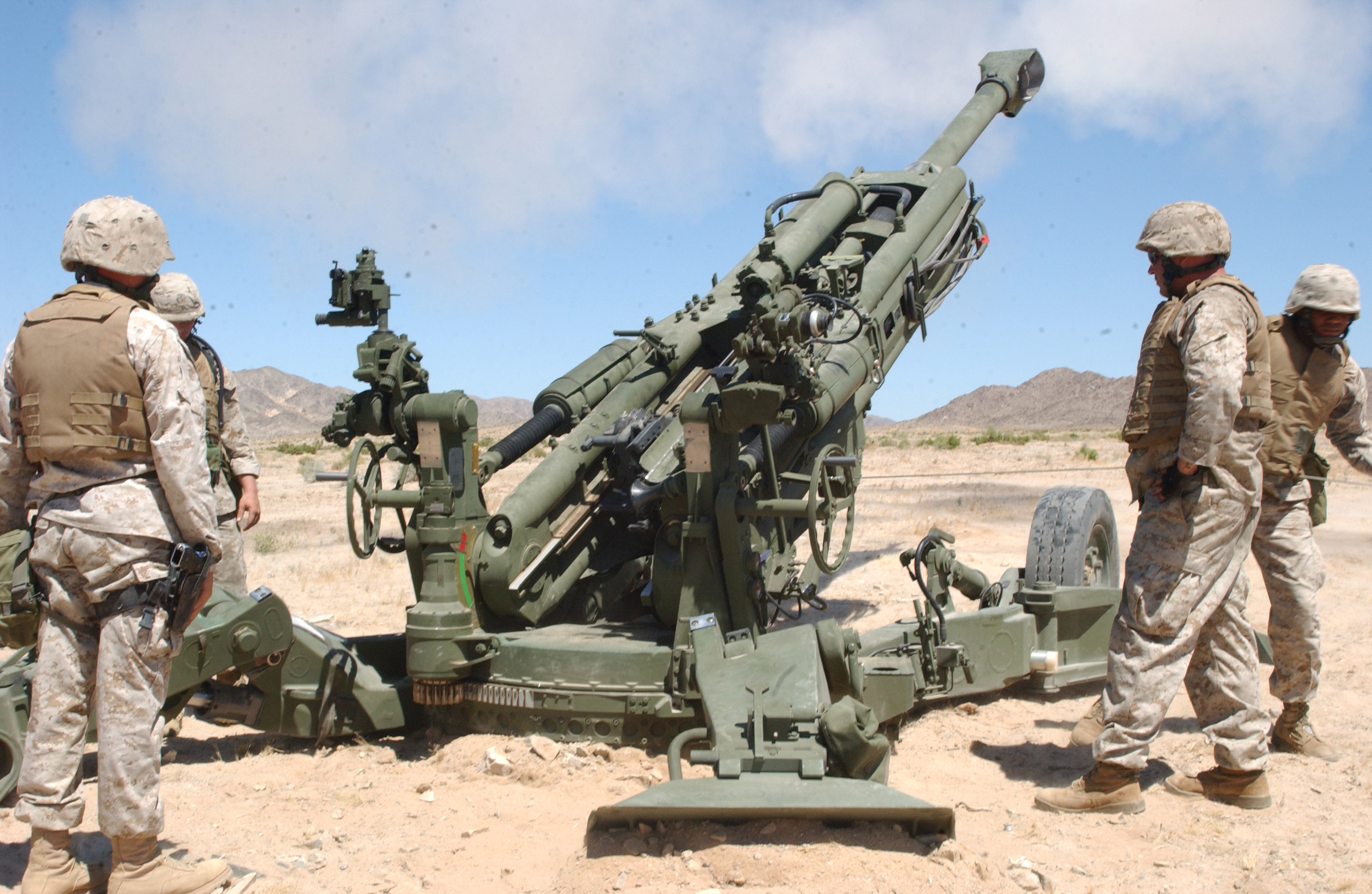
US Marine gunners test fire a GCS Weapons M777 howitzer.

Global Combat Systems (GCS) was formed on 1 February 2009 by the merger of BAE Systems' Land Systems Weapons & Vehicles, Land Systems (Munitions & Ordnance) Ltd and BAE Systems AB in Sweden. It also has a 50/50 joint venture with Nexter (formerly GIAT), CTA International, which is located in Bourges, France.

==== GCS Munitions ====
===== Sector history =====
Upon its creation on 2 January 1985, Royal Ordnance plc owned the twelve Royal Ordnance Factories (ROFs) that remained open, plus the Waltham Abbey South site, RSAF Enfield and three Agency Factories. Several factors delayed the intended privatisation until 22 April 1987, when British Aerospace purchased the company.

In 1999, British Aerospace merged with Marconi Electronic Systems, the defence interests of GEC to form BAE Systems. In 2002 Heckler & Koch was sold to Heckler and Koch Beteiligungs GmbH. In 2004 BAE Systems acquired Alvis plc which was merged with the RO Defence business and ex-GEC plants at Barrow-in-Furness and Leicester to form BAE Systems Land Systems. RO Defence was renamed BAE Systems Land Systems (Munitions and Ordnance).

In 2005, BAE Systems acquired the US company United Defense and merged it with the Land Systems business to create BAE Systems Land and Armaments. The former RO Defence business was renamed BAE Systems Land Systems Munitions. In February 2009, it was merged into GCS as Global Combat Systems Munitions.

===== Products =====
GCS Munitions manufactures 4.6×30mm, 5.56×45mm NATO and 7.62×51mm NATO small arms ammunition, mortars, and land and sea artillery ammunition. It also produces explosives, guidance kits, propellants, demolition charges, initiators, pyrotechnics, and warheads for missiles, torpedoes and depth charges. These include the BROACH multi-stage warhead produced in partnership with Thales Missile Electronics and QinetiQ.

==== GCS Weapons ====
Manufactures "intelligent ammunition, artillery systems, combat vehicle turrets, naval gun and air defence gun systems." Examples include the M777 howitzer.

==== GCS Vehicles ====
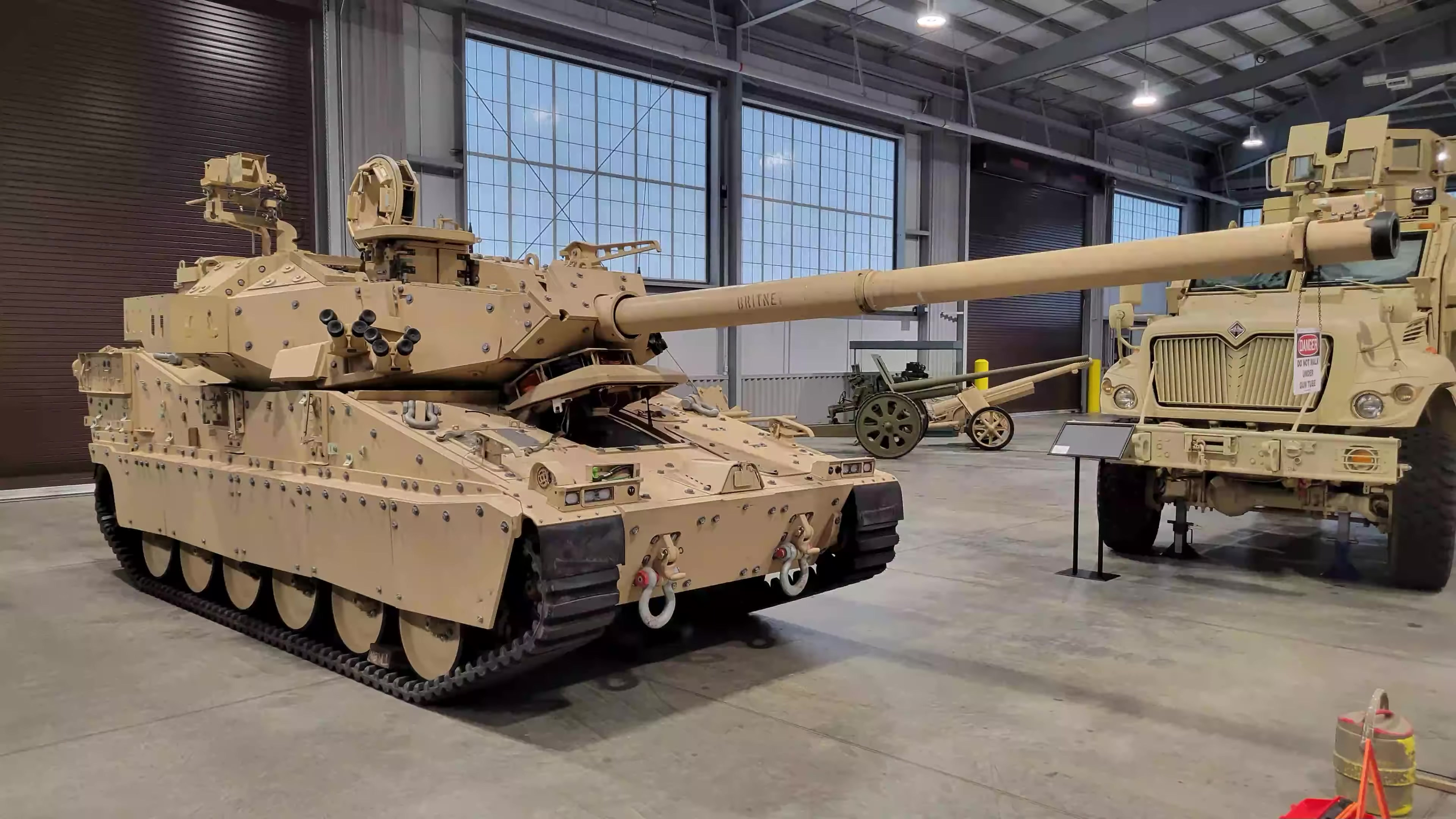
A BAE Systems Mobile Protected Firepower testbed based on the M8 Armored Gun System

Global Combat Systems Vehicles produces and supports main battle tanks, infantry fighting vehicles, armoured engineer vehicles, armoured all-terrain vehicles and military bridging vehicles. Examples include the Challenger 2 main battle tank and the CV90 infantry fighting vehicle family.

=== Security & Survivability ===
Security and Survivability (S&S) consists of 3 Functional Areas: Platform Survivability (PS), Individual Protection Systems (IPS) and Advanced Materials. Platform Survivability Product lines include armored, crashworthy, and armored-crashworthy seating for aerospace products along with mineblast attenuating seats for vehicles. IPS produces individual small arms. In July 2010, it was announced that Security and Survivability would cease to exist on 1 January 2011. The functional areas of S&S will be assigned to Global Tactical Systems (GTS) or the BAE Systems Products Group.

=== Support Solutions ===
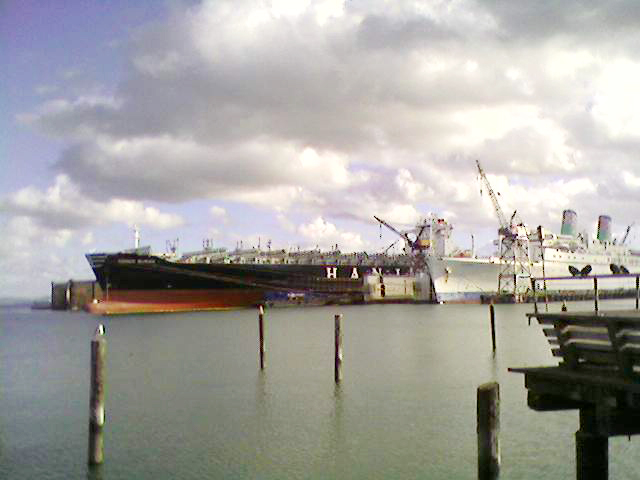
Hanjin's Cosco Busan under repair at BAE Systems in Pier 70 in San Francisco. The ship crashed onto the Bay Bridge on 7 November 2007, and has since left this area.

BAE's Support Solutions provides support of the US Navy's Aegis combat system and "prime systems integration" for the US and Royal Navy submarine fleet ballistic missile systems.

BAE Systems Ship Repair of Norfolk, Virginia is a major non-nuclear ship repair business in the United States, formerly known as United States Marine Repair. The company's primary customer is the United States Navy, other customers include other branches of the US military and commercial cruise lines such as Royal Caribbean. USMR had acquired Norfolk Shipbuilding and Dry Dock Company (NORSHIPCO) in 1998.

In 2004, USMR purchased Honolulu Shipyard Inc. (HSI) for $16 million. HSI was another U.S. Navy ship repair business. USMR was owned by the Carlyle Group who planned to float the company but instead chose to sell it to United Defense (which it partially owned) in May 2002. BAE acquired the latter in 2005. The seven shipyards are Norfolk, San Francisco, Pearl Harbor, San Diego, Mobile, Mayport and Jacksonville.

== Management ==
Bob Murphy was named president of BAE Systems Land & Armaments Operating Group in November 2009 after Linda Hudson was promoted to president and CEO of BAE Systems Inc.

Tom Rabaut was named president of the newly created BAE Systems Land and Armaments, having previously been chief executive officer (CEO) and president of United Defense since January 1994. Rabaut retired in January 2007 and was succeeded by Linda Hudson. Hudson has led General Dynamics Armament and Technical Products and held senior management positions at Lockheed Martin, Martin Marietta, Ford Aerospace, and Harris Corp.
