= Raad-2 =

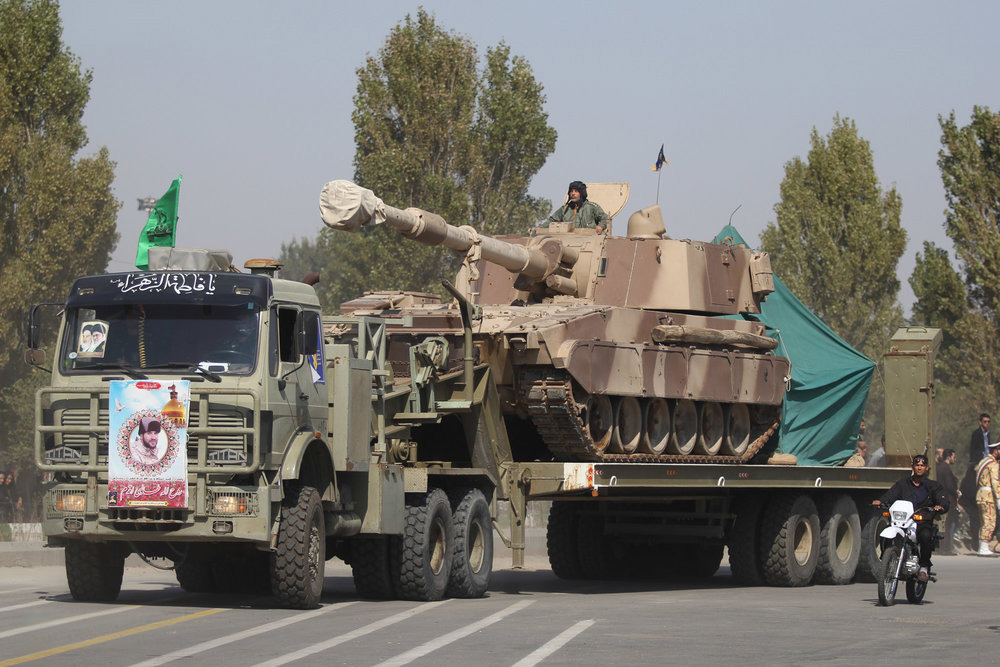
- Raad-2 in 2018
- Type: Self-propelled howitzer
- Place of origin: Iran

Service history
- In service: 1997–present
- Used by: Iran

Production history
- Designer: Defense Industries Organization
- Designed: September 1997
- Produced: 1997–present
- No. built: at least 36
- Variants: Raad-2M

Specifications
- Mass: 36 tons
- Length: 6.72 m (without the gun)
- Width: 3.10 m
- Height: 1.66 m (without the turret)
- Crew: 3 (commander, driver and gunner)
- Rate of fire: 5 rounds/min
- Effective firing range: 30 km (19 mi)
- Main armament: 155 mm HM44 howitzer
- Secondary armament: 12.7 mm HMG
- Engine: V-8 diesel for Raad-2; 5TDF for Raad-2M; 840 hp for Raad-2; 700 hp for Raad-2M
- Suspension: Torsion bar
- Operational range: 500 km
- Maximum speed: 70 km/h (43 mph)

Raad-2 (Persian:رعد-۲ 'Thunder-2') is an Iranian self-propelled howitzer.

== Development ==
In early September 1997, it was reported that Iran had successfully tested a locally built rapid fire mobile field gun known as Raad-2 (Thunder-2).

It uses a turret that has a similar layout to the M109A1 155mm/39-cal self-propelled howitzer. The Iranian Defense Industries Organization claimed that the 155 mm HM44 howitzer manufactured by the Hadid facility of the Iranian Defense Industries Organization had a high firing rate and accuracy. The gun's range was reported as 30 km (19 mi), and it also includes features such as a laser range-finder and a semi-automatic loading system.

The gun looks exactly like 155mm/39-cal M185 gun from M109A1 and is fitted with a double baffle muzzle brake, fume extractor, screw breech mechanism, hydro-pneumatic recuperator and a hydraulic recoil brake. DIO says that the barrel life is around 5,000 rounds.

The vehicle uses a chassis based on the T-72, distinctive due to the cover of the cooling fan on the chassis. The hull is apparently based on the BMP-1.

The Raad-2 is crewed by 5 persons, with the driver stationed at the left with the power pack at the right.

== Operators ==
The Raad-2 is operated by both the Islamic Republic of Iran Army Ground Forces and the Islamic Revolutionary Guard Corps Ground Forces.

== Variants ==
- Raad-2 - basic SPG version with a Russian V12-type V-84MS diesel engine
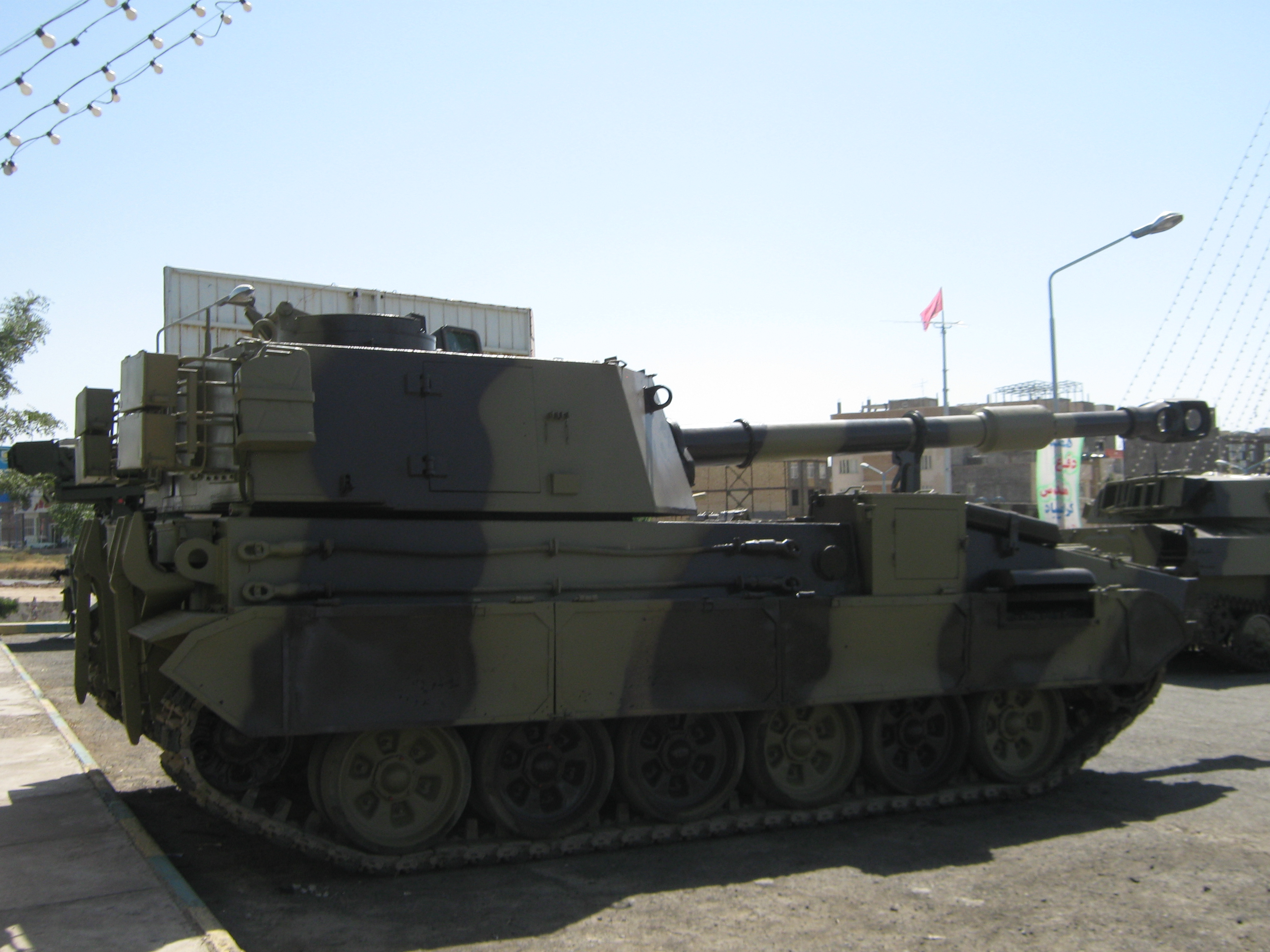
  - Raad-2M
    Raad-2M - Raad-2 upgraded with a Ukrainian-made 5TDF engine instead of a V-8 Diesel engine.
