= Linda Hudson =

American businesswoman

Linda P. Hudson
- Born: Linda Parker Hudson
- Education: University of Florida
- Occupation: Business consultant/speaker

Linda Parker Hudson is an American businesswoman, currently the Chairman & CEO of The Cardea Group and former president and CEO of BAE Systems Inc. and Chief Operating Officer, BAE Systems plc. In her role at BAE Systems Inc., Hudson is the first woman to be the head of a company that is a major contractor with the Pentagon. She currently serves on the board of directors for Bank of America and Ingersoll Rand.

== University diplomas ==
A graduate of the University of Florida, Hudson received her bachelor's degree with honors in Industrial and Systems Engineering in 1972. She remains active in the alumni and athletic associations and serves on advisory boards for the College of Engineering. In 2011, she received an honorary doctorate degree in engineering from Worcester Polytechnic Institute, and in 2014 she received an honorary doctorate in science degree from the University of Florida.

== Career ==
Hudson was the president & CEO of BAE Systems, Inc.
