= Sanders Associates =

American defense contractor

Sanders Associates, Inc.
- Logo
- Founded: July 1951
- Defunct: 1986
- Fate: Sold to Lockheed Corporation, now part of BAE Systems Electronics & Integrated Solutions
- Headquarters: Nashua, New Hampshire, United States
- Products: Computer terminals, printed circuits

Sanders Associates, Inc. was a defense contractor in Nashua, New Hampshire, United States, from 1951 until it was sold in 1986. It is now part of BAE Systems Electronics & Integrated Solutions, a subsidiary of BAE Systems. It concentrated on developing and manufacturing electronic systems, notably aircraft self-protection systems, and tactical surveillance and intelligence systems. Other business areas included microwave, missile, and space electronics; infrared imaging; and automated mission planning systems, with both military and commercial applications.

The first home video game console was developed as a side project by engineer Ralph H. Baer and several assistants at Sanders. The production of the final product was granted to Magnavox, a home electronics company, and sold under the name Magnavox Odyssey.

== History ==
The company was founded in Waltham, Massachusetts in July 1951, formed by eleven engineers and scientists from Raytheon. It was named for Royden C. Sanders Jr., one of the original eleven associates. It moved its operations to Nashua in 1952, taking up a vacant mill building and restoring economic vitality to a city that had been devastated by the post-World War II departure of the textile industry from New England to the lower-cost American South.

Sanders Associates was one of the premier flexible printed circuit manufacturers during the 1960s and 1970s. It specialized in complex flexible circuit assemblies and specialized printed wiring boards for both the U.S. military and space programs including the Saturn V and Lunar Excursion Module. Sanders also produced flexible circuitry for most other commercial applications including medical equipment. Sanders Flexprint division was involved with producing printed wiring boards and flex circuitry for all branches of the military and for all platforms. The Flexprint division was sold in the late seventies or early eighties.

Most divisions of Sanders Associates competed in the government marketplace. One division marketed intelligent terminals to the commercial marketplace. These intelligent terminals competed against IBM 3270 terminals, Honeywell terminals, Univac Uniscope terminals and Burroughs Corporation terminals. Terminals provided data entry capability into mainframes as well as light pen pointing and selection before the mouse was in use. The last Sanders Intelligent terminal system marketed was the 814 terminal controller that supported up to eight terminals. That division was acquired by Harris Corporation in the late 1970s and integrated with their Data Communications Division. For a short time, the Nashua plant facilities were shared between Sanders and Harris, eventually the Harris division was moved to a new facility in Dallas, Texas.

In 1986, Sanders Associates was bought by Lockheed Corporation and became Sanders, A Lockheed Company. Following the Lockheed/Martin Marietta merger in 1995, Sanders was merged into Lockheed Martin Aerospace Electronic Systems. In July 2000, Lockheed announced the sale of this group to BAE Systems for $1.67 billion. The company became BAE Systems Information & Electronic Warfare Systems (IEWS). In 2005, this was merged into the newly created BAE Systems Electronics & Integrated Solutions.

== Video games ==
The first home video game console was developed at Sanders by a team headed by Ralph Baer in 1966. It became the Magnavox Odyssey.
