= Ground Combat Vehicle =

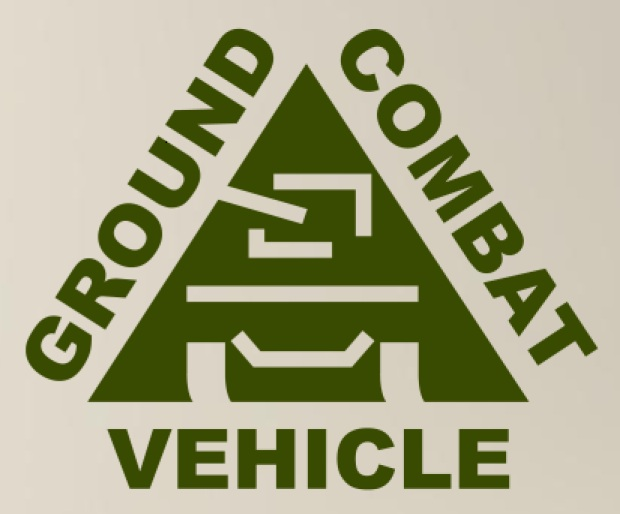
- Ground Combat Vehicle logo
- Type: Infantry fighting vehicle
- Place of origin: United States

Service history
- In service: Canceled

Production history
- Designer: Industry and US Army (Government Furnished E/I/M and synchronization)
- Designed: 2009–2014

The Ground Combat Vehicle (GCV) was a program initiated by the United States Army in 2009, with the goal of developing a next-generation armored fighting vehicle. The first variant of the GCV to be developed would be an infantry fighting vehicle to replace the M2 Bradley.

The program was intended to provide increased protection and firepower for ground troops, with a focus on improved crew survivability. The Army planned on acquiring 1,874 GCV infantry fighting vehicles to replace Bradleys in 16 active and 8 National Guard Heavy Brigade Combat Teams. In 2011, the Army selected BAE Systems and General Dynamics Land Systems to move forward with the GCV program.

The program faced significant challenges from the start, including limited funding and concerns about the weight of the vehicle. The GCV was designed to be heavily armored and to transport a fully equipped squad of nine soldiers, something the Bradley could not do. This requirement necessitated adding significant weight to the vehicle, making it less mobile.

The Army canceled the GCV program in 2014 due to the service's budget constraints. The cancellation of the GCV program marked a setback for the U.S. Army, which had been looking to modernize its armored fighting vehicle fleet for many years. The Department of Defense had canceled the Army's previous combat vehicle program, Future Combat Systems Manned Ground Vehicles in 2009.

After the cancelation of the GCV program, the U.S. Army shifted its focus to upgrading its existing fleet of Bradley Fighting Vehicles. Canceling the GCV freed up Army development resources to proceed with the Armored Multi-Purpose Vehicle (AMPV), the service's replacement for the M113 armored personnel carrier family. The Army has embarked on a comprehensive combat vehicle acquisition effort called Next Generation Combat Vehicle, which includes AMPV within its scope. In 2018 the Army established what came to be known as the Optionally Manned Fighting Vehicle program, the modern successor to the GCV infantry fighting vehicle effort.

== Development ==
=== Background ===
The U.S. Army's M2 Bradley infantry fighting vehicle entered service in 1983. Although production ended in 1995, it was upgraded numerous times over the years.

The U.S. Army's efforts to develop a successor to the Bradley began in the mid-1980s under the Armored Systems Modernization program. The Army studied a family of vehicles utilizing common components. A heavy chassis variant would replace vehicles ranging from howitzers, main battle tanks and Bradleys. This effort was canceled in 1992 due to the collapse of the Soviet Union.

The post–Cold War period saw the Army begin to realize the importance of deploying globally on short notice to small-scale contingencies. In 2000 U.S. Army Chief of Staff General Eric Shinseki laid out his vision for a lighter, more transportable force. He called for a mid-weight unit that would strike a balance between heavy armor and infantry. Shinseki said such a unit would be geared toward for operations short of war. The Army was to do this by investing in an interim fleet that would herald the way to a much more advanced subsequent generation of vehicles. The Army initiated the Interim Armored Vehicle program that year. The resulting Stryker wheeled combat vehicle family entered service in 2002.

The Army initiated the Future Combat Systems (FCS) program in 2000. The combat vehicle component of FCS was the Manned Ground Vehicles program, a family of eight vehicles including an IFV. By substituting active protection systems for armor, the Army sought to reduce the weight of a Manned Ground Vehicle to 20 tons, with transportability by C-130 being the limiting factor. This weight requirement proved difficult to meet. Weight at full combat capability (FCC) had risen to 27 tons by January 2007.

=== Initial program ===
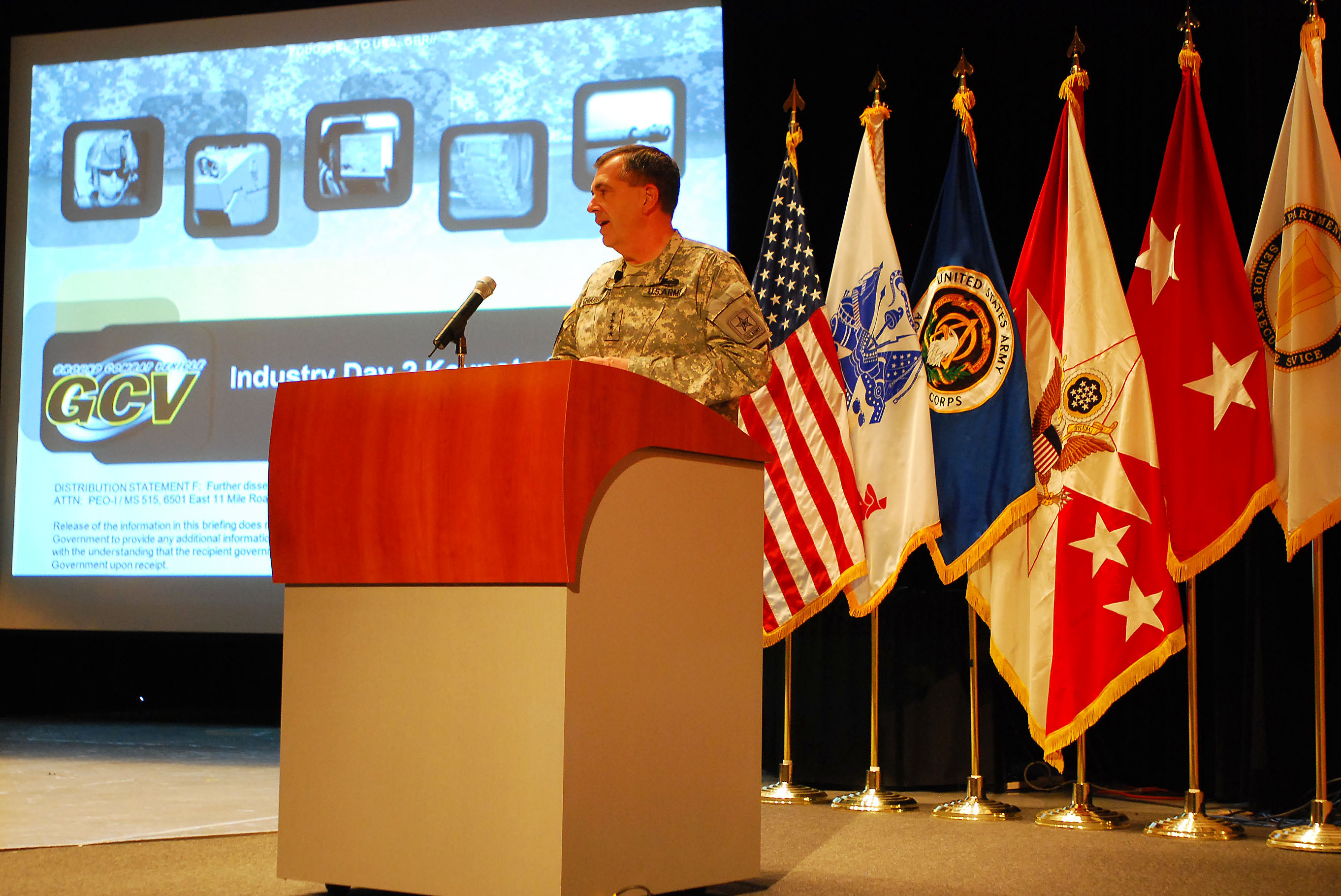
Vice Chief of Staff of the U.S. Army General Peter Chiarelli hosts the second industry day.

Secretary of Defense Robert Gates announced his intention of halting funding for the FCS in April 2009. In May, Army and Department of Defense representatives outlined plans for the cancellation of Future Combat Systems and the initiation of the Ground Combat Vehicle program in its place.

In June 2009, a blue-ribbon panel met in Washington D.C. to determine the requirements for the Ground Combat Vehicle. It was concluded at this meeting that an infantry fighting vehicle (IFV) was to be the first vehicle variant fielded. Later that month, FCS was formally dissolved and many programs including the Manned Ground Vehicle program were canceled with it.

In October and November 2009, the Army held informational sessions for potential GCV contractors. Also that month, Program Executive Office Integration was established to oversee subsystems of BCT Modernization including the GCV. A required review was held and passed in February 2010 in Washington. The GCV request for proposals (RFP) was issued in February 2010. It was revealed in the RfP that the GCV would be a cost-plus contract.

By the May deadline, four proposals were submitted.

In July, management of the GCV was transferred from PEO Integration to PEO Ground Combat Systems with Andrew DiMarco as project manager. In May, a team was formed to expedite the GCV's seven-year development time. For fiscal year 2011, the U.S. Army sought to spend $934 million of the $2.5 billion allocated for BCT Modernization to develop the GCV.

Up to three competitive contracts were to be awarded by early fall. A prototype development contract decision would have followed by 2013. The Technology Development Phase (or Milestone A) would begin in the fourth quarter of Fiscal Year 2010 with the award of up to three vehicle contracts. This was to be followed by an Engineering & Manufacturing Development (EMD) phase and Low Rate Initial Production (LRIP) phase before full production could start.

Nine vehicles were evaluated in the Army's 2011 Analysis of Alternatives (AOA) for the GCV. The four primary vehicles included in the AOA were the M2A3 Bradley II, a modernized Stryker, an M2A3 Bradley variant used in Iraq, and a XM1230 Caiman Plus MRAP. The five secondary vehicles included two unnamed foreign-made platforms, the M1126 Stryker IFV, the M1A2 SEP TUSK Abrams main battle tank, and a modernized M1 Abrams. Vehicles included the AOA were determined to be inferior to the planned GCV.

In August 2010 the Army retracted its request for proposals after the team assembled in May recommended that the Army either upgrade the existing ground vehicle fleet or rewrite the requirements. A new RFP was to be issued 60 days later. When Vice Chief of Staff of the United States Army Peter Chiarelli was asked if the Army was developing an alternative to the GCV, Chiarelli replied "We're totally committed to GCV." The National Commission on Fiscal Responsibility and Reform suggested deferring development of the GCV until after 2015.

Projections

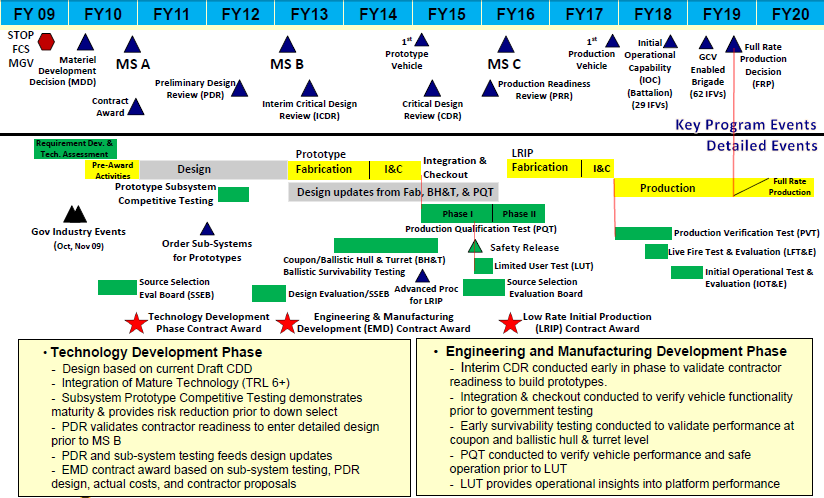
The IFV schedule as of January 2010

The Technology Development Phase was to begin with the award of up to three vehicle contracts in late FY2010. The Army planned to spend $7.6 billion during this phase.

The Engineering and Manufacturing Development Phase was to begin with two prototype development contracts awarded in the beginning of FY2013. The first prototypes would be manufactured mid-FY2015.

The Low Rate Initial Production Phase was to begin with a low-rate production contract awarded in mid FY2016. Less than two years after the contract award LRIP would begin. After more testing a battalion-sized team would be attained in FY2018 followed by a brigade-sized arsenal in FY2019.

The Army would then decide whether to go into full-rate production. The Army planned on procuring 1,450 IFVs at a total program cost of $40 billion.

=== Revised program ===
An industry day was held in October in Dearborn, Michigan. The Army reduced its requested FY 2011 budget to $462 million. Advanced Defense Vehicle Systems, General Dynamics Land Systems, and BAE Systems announced their intention of re-competing soon after the cancellation.

The revised RfP was issued in November. ADVS announced that it would not submit a proposal due to the program's extended timeline.

Up to three cost-plus contracts were to be awarded nine months after the RfP was released. The Army delivered an analysis of alternatives to Congress in April 2011. The notional GCV fared well compared to comparable vehicles including the Stryker and foreign counterparts such as the Israeli Namer and German Puma. An acquisition decision memorandum in August 2011 allowed the program to award technology development contracts. It also initiated two reviews of alternatives including a revised analysis of alternatives and an analysis of non-developmental vehicles. In August, the Army awarded technology development contracts to BAE and GDLS. BAE was awarded $450 million while GDLS was awarded $440 million. SAIC protest the award later that month, saying it believed the evaluations process was flawed and the evaluation took factors into consideration that were not stated in the request for proposal. The Army suspended work on the GCV until December, when the Government Accountability Office denied SAIC's protest.

Projections

The Army requested $884 million to fund the GCV in FY 2012. The technology development phase was to be a 24 months long, 3 months shorter than the previous plan. The Engineering and Manufacturing Development phase was to be 48 months long. The Army planned on acquiring 1,874 GCVs to replace Bradleys in 16 active and 8 National Guard Heavy Brigade Combat Teams.

Milestone A

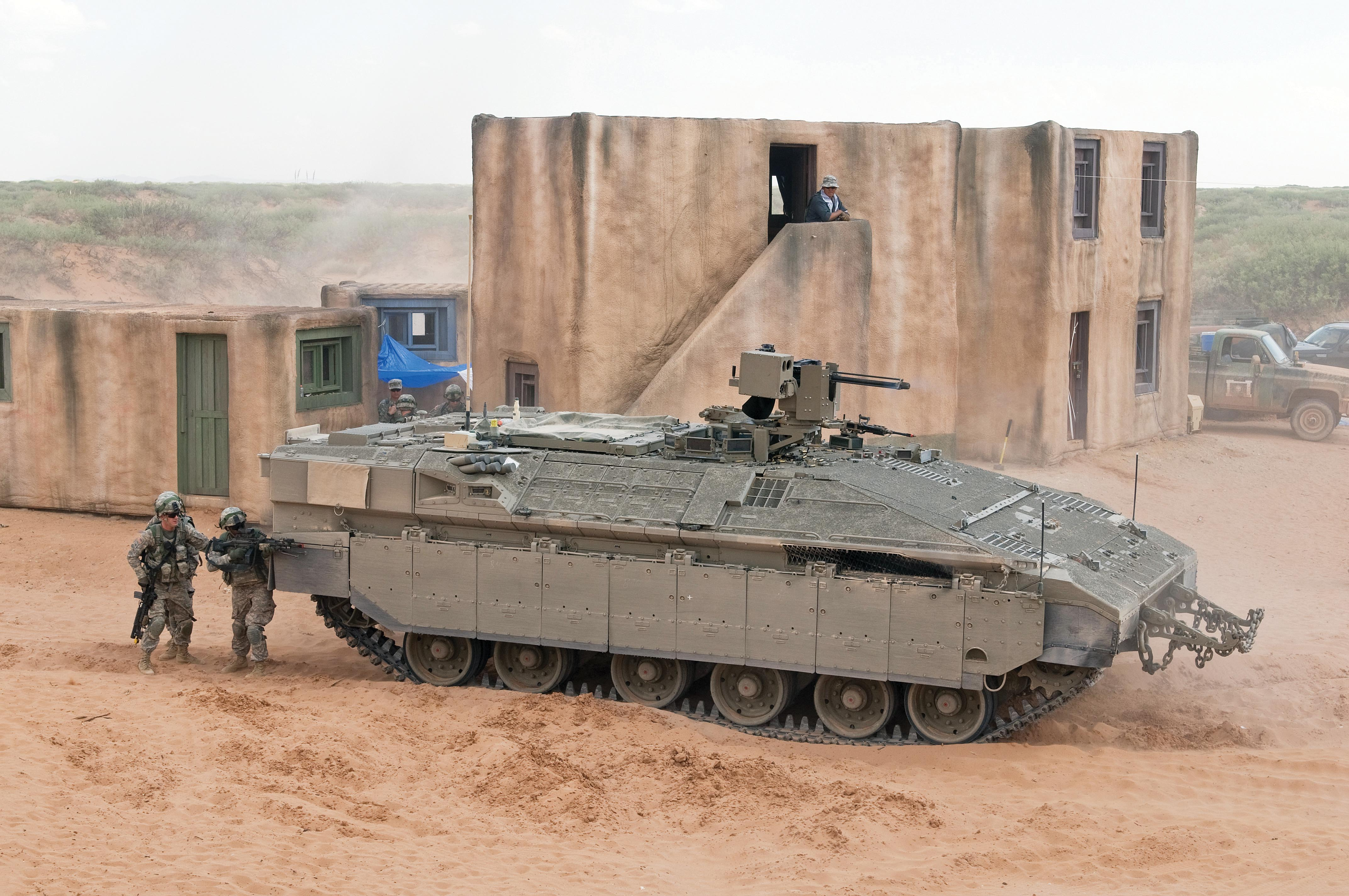
A Namer APC during non-developmental vehicle assessment

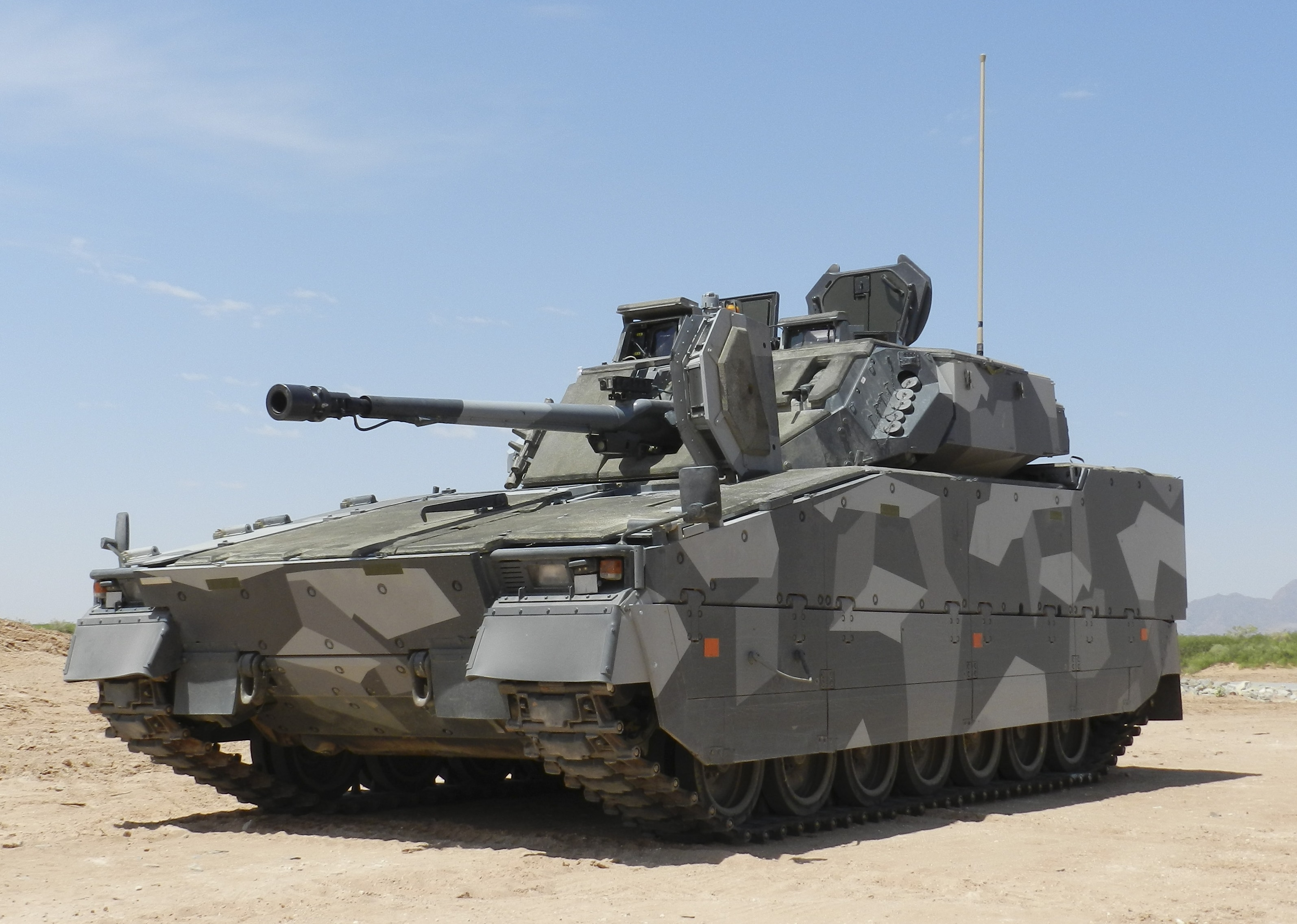
A CV-9035 demonstrator vehicle for the non-developmental vehicle assessment

Testing of commercially available combat vehicles began in May 2012 at Fort Bliss and White Sands Missile Range to prepare the Army for Milestone B. The non-developmental vehicle analysis assessed five vehicles, the M2A3 Bradley, Namer, CV-9035, a double v-hulled M1126 infantry carrier vehicle and a turretless Bradley. The tests, completed that month, were carried out to determine what vehicle variants and configurations fulfill the Army's needs. The Army found that although the vehicles assessed met some GCV requirements, no currently fielded vehicle met enough without needing significant redesign.

Competitors

There were three competing contractors for the Ground Combat Vehicle contract.

- BAE Systems, Northrop Grumman, QinetiQ North America, Saft Group, and iRobot were working jointly on development
- General Dynamics Land Systems led a team that included Lockheed Martin and Raytheon
- SAIC led a team that include Boeing, Krauss-Maffei Wegmann and Rheinmetall Defence (not awarded EMD contract)

Milestone C

A Milestone C decision could have been made in 2019.

=== Budget concerns and proposed cuts ===
In December 2012, it was reported that the Army may need to cut $150 million from the GCV program in 2014, with deeper cuts between $600–700 million between 2014 and 2018. This put the program, one of the Army's highest priorities, at serious risk. With the drawdown of the War in Afghanistan and budgetary concerns, the expensive development of a new combat vehicle was not seen as feasible. BAE Systems and General Dynamics were each awarded engineering and manufacturing development (EMD) phase contracts in August 2011. The EMD phase was to last 48 months for both contractors. Senate appropriators were also concerned that the GCV would compete with the Army's other combat modernization priorities. Though the GCV would make up only 10 percent of the Army combat vehicle fleet, the Army had programmed 80 percent of its combat vehicle modernization budget for the GCV over the next five years.

=== Revision ===
The Army revised the GCV acquisition strategy in January 2013 to reduce risk and maintain affordability of the program. The revision extended the technology development phase by six months to give industry more time to refine vehicle designs. Milestone B would occur in 2014, with the selection of a single vendor for the engineering and manufacturing development (EMD) phase of the program. Budgetary pressures caused the Army to reduce the number of vendors to be selected for EMD from two to one. The Army expected this change would save the DoD $2.5 billion.

=== CBO report ===
In April 2013, the Congressional Budget Office (CBO) issued a report on the progress of the GCV program. The report questioned the program, estimated to cost $28 billion from 2014 to 2030, with the possibility of alternate vehicle options. While none met overall Army goals desired in the GCV, they offered advantages in being less costly and delayed. Planned GCV prototypes were heavy, weighing up to 84 tons, to be better protected and seat a nine-man squad. Officials said that a vehicle of that size would not be well suited to operations faced in Iraq or Afghanistan. Alternate vehicles would be cheaper and more maneuverable in urban settings. The CBO report analyzed four alternative options:

- Purchase the Namer APC – Seats 9 soldiers with combat survival rates expected slightly higher than the GCV, and costs $9 billion less. The Namer has less ability to destroy other enemy vehicles and is less mobile. Production would be conducted in part domestically, but fielding would require collaboration with foreign companies and governments.
- Upgrade the Bradley IFV – An upgraded Bradley would be more lethal than the GCV against enemy forces and would probably survive combat at about the same rates as would the GCV, saving $19.8 billion. Upgrading the Bradley would make it "significantly more capable" than the GCV. The Bradley still only carries a 7-man squad and has less mobility.
- Purchase the Puma – More lethal than the GCV, combat survival and protection at better rates, and just as mobile. Purchasing the Puma would save $14.8 billion and was considered the most capable of the vehicles. Puma IFVs only carry six infantrymen, which would require five vehicles to replace every four Bradleys. Development and production would require collaboration with foreign companies and governments.
- Cancel the Ground Combat Vehicle – If the Army reconditioned its current Bradley instead of replacing them, the current capability of the IFV fleet could be maintained through 2030. The Army could continue to investigate ways to improve the current Bradleys, but it would not field any new or improved vehicles. The $24 billion saved in funding could be used on other programs.

General Dynamics and BAE Systems, who received contracts in the Ground Combat Vehicle program, criticized the CBO report, saying they used the wrong vehicle in its analysis. Officials from both companies said they used the wrong notional model of the GCV that did not account for the change in requirements made by the Army or the advancements made in the technology development phase of the program. They also criticized the comparisons of the other vehicles. The report factored cost, survivability, mobility, and lethality, ranking the GCV's capabilities as lower than all others. The Army questioned the suitability of existing design. An Army test of currently fielded vehicles in 2012 revealed that some met critical GCV requirements, but none met enough without needing significant redesign. They also note that lethality was judged with a 25 mm cannon for analysis, before the Army planned to mount a 30 mm cannon. The CBO report did give credit to cost, assuming the Army's goal of $13 million per vehicle. However, Pentagon cost assessments estimated the price at $16–$17 million per vehicle.

=== Funding cut and prioritization ===
In July 2013, Army Chief of Staff General Ray Odierno warned that the GCV program might be delayed or possibly even cancelled because of the sequestration budget cuts. In August 2013, Defense Secretary Chuck Hagel outlined two basic results if the effects of sequestration continued: modernization programs like the GCV would be cut to maintain troop levels, or high-end capability efforts like the GCV would be preserved to continue modernization and keep equipment technologically advanced with troop levels being cut. Odierno was committed to balancing soldiers, readiness, and modernization, and was intent on the need for the Ground Combat Vehicle.

Some reports suggested that the Armored Multi-Purpose Vehicle (AMPV) program to replace the M113 family of vehicles was being favored over the GCV program. While procurement of the AMPV fleet would cost over $5 billion, the Government Accountability Office estimated the GCV fleet would cost $37 billion. A September 2013 Congressional Research Service report suggested that given budgetary constraints, the GCV program may be unrealistic, and that one potential discussion could focus on a decision by the Army to replace the GCV with the AMPV as their number one ground combat vehicle acquisition priority. An October 2013 Congressional Budget Office report found that $16 billion could be saved over the next 13 years if the GCV were canceled in favor of Bradley upgrades.

By mid-November 2013, both BAE and General Dynamics designs had passed Preliminary Design Reviews (PDR), but neither company had commenced building prototypes. The Army was increasingly willing to slow down the GCV program or push it back from EMD to research and development. While the Army had said previously that the GCV was their highest priority acquisition program, they had since shifted their main modernization priority to an integrated electronic command network.

In January 2014, a spending bill passed by the House appropriated $100 million for the GCV program, even though the Army had requested $592 million for the program for FY2014. The Army planned to spend 80 percent of its ground vehicle modernization budget on the GCV over the next five years, with costs ranging from $29–34 billion. Several options were being considered to make the program more affordable, including reducing the squad size from nine men and using new emerging and undeveloped technologies to reduce the weight of the vehicle to 30 tons for operations in urban environments. The two contractors would run out of money for development of their prototype vehicles by June 2014 unless the Army funded the rest of the technology development phase. The Pentagon and Army tried to find ways to continue the program, without actually starting vehicle production, through new technologies like advanced fire control systems and hybrid engines. Although the Army wanted 1,894 Ground Combat Vehicles with a target price of $9–10.5 million per unit, the Pentagon's Office of Cost Assessment and Program Evaluation estimated a unit cost of up to $17 million. The 83 percent cut in funding essentially scaled back the GCV program to a research effort. The program had declined in support over the past months with the Army determining that the desired vehicle was no longer feasible in the near term due to budget reductions, suspicion from the contractors that the program would not move past technology development, and Congress's belief it would not succeed.

In January 2014, Odierno confirmed that the GCV program was being put on hold due to budget difficulties. Odierno said that the Army needed a new IFV but that they could not afford one at the time. Odierno said that he was pleased with the requirements for the vehicle and that progress and development with the contractors was good. Science and technology investments were to be made to address the size and weight of armored ground vehicles to make it easier and cheaper to transport greater numbers of them across the world. On the recommendation of the Army, the DoD formally canceled the GCV program in February 2014.

== Weight issues ==
In November 2012, estimates of the GCV's weight, depending on armor packages, put the General Dynamics entry vehicle at 64–70 tons, and the BAE Systems entry vehicle at 70–84 tons. This made the planned infantry fighting vehicle designs heavier than the M1 Abrams tank. The reason was the vehicle had to have enough armor to protect a squad of nine troops from all battlefield threats (from rocket-propelled grenades to IEDs) as good as or better than other vehicles can protect against specific threats individually. This worked against the vehicle; as weight increases, cost goes up and maneuverability goes down. The contractors worked to bring the weight down. The Army maintained that heavy armor was needed to protect the squad from acceleration forces that come with an underside blast, and that thicker underbelly plates and V-shaped hulls do not give enough protection. More armor would come from the vehicle being larger for more internal space for the soldiers, and to allow for features such as floating floors for blast deflection and extra headroom. The Army also said heavy weight would not affect deployability because the Bradley it was planned to replace already requires strategic airlift transport aircraft.

Both contractors claimed their designs were below the 70–84 tons expectation of what the GCV will weigh. BAE's vehicle weighed 60–70 tons, based on modular armor package, and a 20 percent margin for weight increase the Army had planned for future upgrades would bring it up to 84 tons. General Dynamic's vehicle with a diesel engine weighed 62 tons in its most heavily armored configuration, which increased to 76 tons with the 20 percent future upgrade margin. Removing protection for easier air transportation would have reduced it to 56 tons. The Army's consideration to slow down the GCV development program gave time to the companies to refine their designs and reduce weight. One way would have been to reduce squad size. A nine-man squad has been identified as best for being able to fight with the possibility of taking casualties with single-vehicle transportability. With a three-man crew, the GCV had to carry 12 men. A greater number of lighter IFVs that carry fewer soldiers would have similar carrying capacity and combined costs and weight to planned GCV numbers. Another way would be an advance in armor designs. Lighter and stronger armor materials had not made radical progressions in recent history, and domestic active protection intercept systems were not yet mature. Foreign systems like the Israeli Trophy had seen combat but cannot yet intercept tank shells. The GCV program originally included an APS, but was then delayed as a feature for later upgrades. The last effort to replace the Bradley had been FCS from 2003 to 2009, which developed a vehicle that relied on sensors to avoid danger and an APS in place of heavy armor. It was too ambitious for the time and the vehicle's weight had grown from 19 tons to 30 tons by the time it was cancelled.

== Termination ==
In February 2014, Defense Secretary Chuck Hagel canceled the GCV, accepting the Army's request to do so. Army acquisition executive Heidi Shyu said that criticism of the program was "unfortunate" and cancelling it had nothing to do with vehicle performance. Shyu said the program had been doing "remarkably well" and wasn't having technical issues, and that the contracts were being executed well. The decision to cancel development was based entirely on budget calculations, with no possible way to come up with funds no matter how many other areas were reduced Money will be redistributed to engineering change proposals (ECP) on existing platforms until budget difficulties pass to allow investment in next-generation capabilities in about seven years.

The decision had to be made to either exclusively fund the GCV or ECPs, so upgrades were chosen for the Bradley, Abrams, Stryker, and M109 Paladin. Vehicles like the Bradley and Abrams have been upgraded since the 1980s with new armor, sensors, and other gear that have maxed out the platforms for further horsepower and electrical advances, so the requirement for an entirely new ground combat vehicle built from the outset from lessons learned in combat from the previous decade remains. The Army's own budget proposal unveiled in March discontinued the program, and instead funds were shifted to the AMPV program as the main vehicle priority and to improving the Bradley IFV in the interim until more resources become available. Incremental improvements will be made to current vehicle fleets to improve protection and networking abilities. $131 million will be directed into science and technology to look at the feasibility of future combat vehicle technologies, and Secretary Hagel has directed the Army, as well as the Marine Corps, to deliver "realistic" visions for vehicle modernization by the end of FY 2014.

The cancellation of the GCV is the second time in 15 years an Army program to replace the Bradley has failed. FCS ran from 1999 to 2009, with the Manned Ground Vehicles portion for replacing several armored vehicle classes costing "hundreds of millions" of dollars out of $20 billion total. From 2010 to 2014, the Army spent over $1 billion on the GCV. Although there was criticism that vehicle weight could not be kept at a reasonable level while meeting its size and power requirements, the Army maintains the official reason for the cancellation was budgetary pressures. BAE Systems and General Dynamics will each receive $50 million in FY 2015 to continue technology development. The next follow-up IFV development program is currently named the Future Fighting Vehicle (FFV).

== Legacy ==
At the time of the GCV's cancelation, it was thought that the Army might direct some funds for technology development so that it could start another program within "three to four years." In August 2014 GDLS and BAE Systems Land and Armaments were awarded $7.9 million each to develop technologies from the GCV program for the Future Fighting Vehicle (FFV) program. Citing budget constraints, in August 2015, the Army delayed the FFV's acquisition decision from FY2021 to FY2029. The Army said it was choosing to instead work on short-term capability gaps. In June 2018, the Army established what would become the Optionally Manned Fighting Vehicle (OMFV) program to replace the M2 Bradley. In June 2023, the Army downselected American Rheinmetall and GDLS to go forward in the competition for the OMFV contract, now designated the XM30 Mechanized Infantry Combat Vehicle.

== Design ==
Following the cancelation of the Future Combat Systems family the Army assessed that a new infantry fighting vehicle (IFV) would be its first priority with the GCV program. The Army determined that it would reset the M1 Abrams main battle tank, the M2 Bradley IFV and the M109 Paladin self-propelled howitzer in the meantime while the GCV was undergoing development. The GCV could later serve as the common chassis for a family of vehicles to replace legacy armored vehicles.

The Army emphasized affordability, rapid deployment, and low-risk technology for the GCV. The Army required that all aspects of the GCV be at technology readiness level 6. The shortfalls of rapid deployment would be mitigated through an incremental addition of components as technology matures. The Army provided details from the Future Combat Systems (FCS) Manned Ground Vehicles (MGV) effort to utilize on the GCV. The GCV was required to have better protection than any vehicle in the military's inventory.

Army General Peter W. Chiarelli said that the "four main fundamentals" of the vehicle were: The ability to carry 12 soldiers and operate in all forms of combat; have significant protection; and deliver the first production vehicle by 2018.

The IFV would be modular and networked and offer improved survivability, mobility, and power management functions. The GCV family would use technologies pioneered with the IFV lead vehicle effort.

The Army's GCV requirements were left somewhat open-ended.

The GCV was to be networked and offer improved survivability. Elements of the Manned Ground Vehicles program were provided—such as the armor matrix—were provided to contractors to be utilized in design proposals for the GCV.

=== Network ===
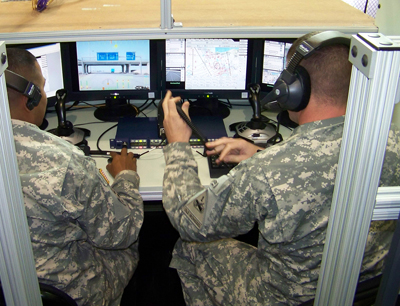
The GCV was planned to be networked.

The GCV was to be operable with the current battle command control and communications suite but would gradually use a more state-of-the-art networked integration system known as the BCT Network. It would provide exportable electrical power, and a battery charging capability for external hardware including vehicles and electronics from the BCT Soldier subsystems. The system would be capable of integration with unmanned systems and dismounted soldiers.

The Mounted Soldier System was to enhance situational awareness through wireless communications and input from vehicle sensors and external sources such as other vehicles.

=== Electrical power ===
The IFV would provide exportable electrical power, and battery charging capability for soldier systems.

=== Mobility ===
The GCV must have been transportable by cargo aircraft, rail, and ship. The Army required it to meet the availability rates of the current Stryker. The Army did not limit the vehicle by the dimensions of the C-130 Hercules, which, in the past, constrained many designs. Air mobility would be provided by the more spacious C-17 Globemaster III. The GCV was to have good cross-country mobility, with a baseline requirement of 30 mph off-road speed. The GCV should have delivered higher sustainability levels and consume less fuel than the Bradley or other vehicles of similar weight and power. The Army did not specify whether it preferred a tracked or wheeled solution, though the requirements seemed to suggest a tracked design was called for.

In its standard configuration, the IFV would have a crew of three and carry a squad of nine. The vehicle could be reconfigured to support casualty evacuation. The Army stated no preference as to whether the IFV should be tracked or wheeled but suggested that it be tracked due to the weight stemming from the requirements.

=== Offensive capabilities ===
The Army wanted the vehicle to feature a commander's weapons station, autocannon, coaxial weapon, and an anti-tank guided missile system. The weapons suite had to be manually operable when damaged and the commander's weapon station had to incorporate a shield. Additionally, a dismountable anti-armor weapon would be carried on board. The Army also stated that the weapon suite would emphasize modularity, be able to defeat other IFVs, and provide non-lethal capability to enable use in civilian environments.

The Army evaluated weapons solutions ranging from 25 mm to 50 mm caliber, and identified 30×173mm as "the most likely" design to meet the GCV's requirements. Specific requirements were for airburst capability to defeat infantry targets (with high explosive incendiary recognized as a "less effective alternative"), armor-piercing rounds to defeat material threats, and training ammunition for each tactical round. Potential candidates included five U.S. produced and three foreign-made rounds. In August 2013, a sources sought announcement was made for a Cooperative Research and Development Agreement for 30×173 mm ammunition: High Explosive Incendiary-Tracer (HEI-T), Armor Piercing Fin Stabilized Discarding Sabot-Tracer (APFSDS-T), and Target Practice Discarding Sabot-Tracer (TPDS-T). The announcement called for the cartridges to be compatible with the Bushmaster III weapon system, such as XM813 and/or Mk 44 Mod 1.

=== Countermeasures ===
The Army wanted the GCV to have a blast protection level equivalent to the MRAP and would utilize hit avoidance systems. The Army wanted to install an active protection system on the Ground Combat Vehicle. BAE tested the Artis LLC Iron Curtain and General Dynamics demonstrated a version of the Israeli Trophy system. By incorporating an APS, the GCV would only need 18 tons of ballistic armor protection, compared to 52 tons of armor required without it. Developers were considering modular armor technology, with the ability to add on and remove armor plates depending on threat levels and mission requirements.

The Mounted Soldier System (MSS) was being developed for GCV crew members. Dismounted leaders would utilize the Ground Soldier Systems.

Thermal management and acoustic noise reduction would be utilized to avoid detection. The vehicle would be able to avoid threats by laying obscurants. An array of hit avoidance systems would be leveraged and the Army offered the various active protection systems developed for the Manned Ground Vehicle program. The GCV enabled the detection and neutralization of mines at standoff ranges. The vehicle was to be equipped with an engagement detection system. The Army required the IFV to have the passive blast protection level equal to the MRAP.

The Army made available the composition of the armor of the Manned Ground Vehicle program. A transparent armor shield would provide protection for the vehicle commander when exposed through the turret. In addition, a Vehicle Health Management System would provide vehicle diagnostic monitoring systems for commanders. A fire suppression system and ammunition detonation protection would be utilized for damage control.

A secondary squad egress was to be provided for the squad to exit in emergencies.

== Tactics ==
The Infantry Fighting Vehicle variant was intended to fill the infantry transport role in Heavy Brigade Combat Teams replacing the aging M2 Bradley.

In the U.S. Army, as part of the ongoing restructuring, Heavy Brigade Combat Team Brigades would have 62 IFV's, battalions would have 29, and platoons would have 4. Platoons were to be led by platoon leader GCV which would be accompanied by platoon medic, forward observer, Radio Transmission Operator, and other attachments and would command three other GCVs.

The Army placed importance on the GCV's ability to carry a full nine-man squad. Numerous Army studies have concluded that a squad, made up of two fireteams, should be composed of nine to eleven soldiers. The M2 Bradley cannot carry a complete squad from one vehicle, creating risk when transitioning from mounted to dismounted operations. The Bradley's lower carrying capacity was accepted for greater (than previous vehicles) mounted lethality and cost savings, leading to squads being broken apart for transport. A GCV with a nine-man squad would have allowed the squad leader to control and communicate with the squad while mounted, simplify the transition to dismounted operations in complex terrain, and allow the squad to conduct independent fire and maneuver immediately upon dismount. Replacing the Bradley on a one-for-one basis would have four GCVs per mechanized infantry platoon carrying one full nine-man squad in a single vehicle, with three vehicles carrying squads and one carrying the platoon's organic and attached enablers.

== Variants ==
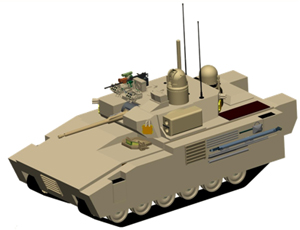
A notional GCV

The Army was using an incremental approach to combat vehicle modernization, centered on the Ground Combat Vehicle. The deployment was to be synchronized with upgrades, reset, and divestiture of existing vehicles. Vehicles displaced by the IFV may then replace selected M113 family of vehicles such as command and control, medical evacuation, and mortar carrier, allowing the Army to begin divestiture of the M113 family of vehicles. Upgrades to existing Bradley and Stryker vehicles may have been considered as risk mitigation based on the rate at which the GCV was introduced. Although upgraded, the Bradley and Stryker would also be replaced in the midterm.

=== Infantry fighting vehicle ===
The infantry fighting vehicle variant replaced the previous infantry carrier replacement effort, the XM1206 Infantry Carrier Vehicle of the FCS MGV program. The IFV was to hold a crew of three and a squad of nine.

== Competitors ==
Competitors

There were four known competing contractors for the Ground Combat Vehicle contract.

A concept image of a BAE contender

- BAE Systems, Northrop Grumman, QinetiQ and Saft Group were working jointly on development. The program was managed by Mark Signorelli. The team believed it could field the vehicle up to two years sooner than projected. Development cost were "tens of millions of dollars".

- Work breakdown

- BAE would provide general vehicle design, program management, integration of the vehicle components.
- Northrop Grumman would provide technology pertaining to command, control, communications, intelligence, surveillance and reconnaissance.
- QinetiQ would provide the electric drive propulsion system.
- Saft would provide the energy storage system.

- Features

- Tracked with an E-X-Drive hybrid-electric engine.
- Baseline weight of 53 tons with a weight tolerance of 75 tons for modular armor.
- Manned turret.
- Leveraged a V-hull and Hard-Kill and Soft-Kill active protection systems.
- Wider and taller than a Bradley. All or most of the storage was internal accounting for the extra size.

- General Dynamics Land Systems, Lockheed Martin, Detroit Diesel and Raytheon were working jointly on development.

- Work breakdown

- General Dynamics Land Systems led the team as systems integrator and was responsible for soldier interfaces and chassis.
- Lockheed Martin would develop the turret and weaponry.
- Detroit Diesel would develop the propulsion system.
- Raytheon would develop the active protection systems, sensors.

- Features

- Used conventional diesel.
- Used active protection systems.

- SAIC led a consortium called Team Full Spectrum which included Boeing, Krauss-Maffei and Rheinmetall. The SAIC consortium is using a derivative of the Puma.

- Work breakdown

- SAIC would lead the team as project manager.
- Boeing would supply the weaponry.
- Both Krauss-Maffei and Rheinmetall's roles were unknown.

- Features

- Larger, reconfigured Puma chassis.
- Used conventional diesel and a six-road-wheel configuration.

- Advanced Defense Vehicle Systems (ADVS) submitted its wheeled proposal which was rejected for being non-compliant. ADVS protested the decision, but withdrew it after the Army canceled the RfP.

- Features

- Wheeled.

=== BAE Systems ===
The BAE Systems GCV design had a steel-core hull and an integrated electronic network capability with embedded intelligence, surveillance, and reconnaissance equipment. Its turret was unmanned. The centerpiece of the vehicle was its simplified drive train. It was propelled by a hybrid electric drive (HED), which was developed by Northrop Grumman, that produced 1,100 kW of electricity. Advantages to it are fewer components and lower volume and weight compared to current power plants. The transmission was 40 percent smaller and the drive train had half the moving parts. The hybrid drive train cost 5 percent more than a mechanical system, but had a 20 percent reduction in life-cycle cost. The electric drive allows for smoother low-speed operation and less noise. The vehicle burned 20 percent less fuel while running, with 4.61 U.S. gallons (17.5 liters) per hour used while stationary. It had a top speed of 43 mph (69 km/h), could go from 0 to 20 mph (32 km/h) in 7.8 seconds, and had a range of 186 mi (299 km) with a 255-gallon fuel capacity. Disadvantages to the BAE design included a weight of 70 tons and fuel efficiency of 0.73 mpg. BAE integrated the Artis Iron Curtain active protection system to defeat incoming rockets and missiles before they can hit the vehicle. The Army conducted tests on the system in April 2013, and it successfully passed all tests. BAE tested a system for the vehicle to drive in low visibility conditions using a Humvee with blacked out windows as a surrogate. In August 2013, the BAE GCV's hybrid electric drive completed 2,000 miles of testing on a fully integrated stationary test stand.

Although dramatic funding cuts for the GCV program in January 2014 put the very completion of the acquisition effort in jeopardy, funding remained for research on a hybrid-electric propulsion system. The BAE GCV's hybrid-electric engine is more fuel efficient, has fewer moving parts, and has faster acceleration than ordinary engines. While powering a vehicle concept that reached 70 tons proved impractical, its benefits of providing power for onboard electronics, silent overwatch, and short, stealthy movements are still promising. BAE has pledged to support future Army developmental efforts with technologies from their GCV entry. In July 2014, BAE Systems was awarded a $7.9 million study contract for technical, cost, and risk assessments to utilize the GCV TD phase integrated hybrid-electric propulsion and mobility subsystems Automotive Test Rig (ATR) and the hybrid-electric integrated propulsion subsystem (Hotbuck) for the Future Fighting Vehicle (FFV) effort.

=== General Dynamics ===
In October 2013, General Dynamics successfully completed a preliminary design review of their GCV design. Subsystem and component design reviews were held from August to October of that year and led to the four-day PDR. General Dynamics demonstrated their vehicle met Tier 1 affordability, reliability, and other requirements. The success of the PDR meant that the General Dynamics GCV IFV could be expected to be operationally effective and suitable.

=== SAIC–Boeing ===
Reports suggest that the SAIC–Boeing GCV proposal was rejected by the Army primarily due to concerns over the proposed vehicle's survivability. The Army's primary concern appeared to have been the vehicle's proposed active protection system and the underbody armor designed to protect crewmembers from IEDs. As part of GAO's examination of the protest, it was noted that the Army identified 20 significant weaknesses and informed SAIC that it was "of utmost importance" for the firm to address them.

While SAIC and the German MOD offered potential solutions, the Army judged these as inadequate to address its concerns. There were also additional Army concerns—such as insufficient head clearance for crew members, problems with vehicle occupant seating, a risk of toxic fumes in the crew compartment due to battery pack location, and various hazards affecting a soldier's ability to exit the rear of the GCV—that played a role in GAO's denial of SAIC's protest.

== See also ==
Vehicles

- Armored Multi-Purpose Vehicle, U.S. Army M113 replacement
- Marine Personnel Carrier, wheeled U.S. Marine Corps troop carrier
- Interim Armored Vehicle, a U.S. Army combat vehicle acquisition program that resulted in the Stryker
- Expeditionary Fighting Vehicle, a canceled U.S. Marine Corps amphibious assault vehicle
- M1126 infantry carrier vehicle, a wheeled U.S. Army troop carrier
- XM1206 Infantry Carrier Vehicle, a canceled tracked U.S. Army infantry fighting vehicle
- Optionally Manned Fighting Vehicle, a current U.S. Army infantry fighting vehicle program (part of the Next Generation Combat Vehicle program)
- Future Rapid Effect System, the planned set of armored cavalry vehicles for the British Army
- Namer, a heavy infantry fighting vehicle of the Israeli Defence Forces
- SPz Puma, an infantry fighting vehicle of the German Army
- GTK Boxer, a wheeled German Army troop carrier
- Bionix AFV, tracked Singapore Army troop carrier
- K21, tracked South Korean Army troop carrier
- Véhicule Blindé de Combat d'Infanterie, a wheeled French Army troop carrier

== Bibliography ==
- Foss, Christopher F, ed. (2011). "Armoured Personnel Carriers (Tracked)". Jane's Armour and Artillery 2011–2012 (32nd ed.). Surrey: Janes Information Group. pp. 458–464. ISBN 978-0-71062-960-9.
- Feickert, Andrew (14 March 2014). The Army's Ground Combat Vehicle (GCV) Program: Background and Issues for Congress. Congressional Research Service (Report). This article incorporates text from this source, which is in the public domain.
- Hunnicutt, Richard Pearce (15 September 2015) [1999]. Bradley: A History of American Fighting and Support Vehicles. Battleboro, VT: Echo Point Books & Media. ISBN 978-1-62654-153-5.
- Kempinski, Bernard; Murphy, Christopher (November 2012). Technical Challenges of the U.S. Army's Ground Combat Vehicle Program (PDF) (Report). Congressional Budget Office.
- Pernin, Christopher; Axelband, Elliot; Drezner, Jeffrey; Dille, Brian; Gordon IV, John; Held, Bruce; McMahon, Scott; Perry, Walter; Rizzi, Christopher; Shah, Akhil; Wilson, Peter; Sollinger, Sollinger (2012). Lessons from the Army's Future Combat Systems Program (PDF) (Report). RAND Corporation. Archived (PDF) from the original on 25 March 2020 – via Defense Technical Information Center.
