= XM30 Mechanized Infantry Combat Vehicle =

Program of United States Army

The XM30 Mechanized Infantry Combat Vehicle (MICV), formerly known as the Optionally Manned Fighting Vehicle (OMFV), is a U.S. Army program to replace the M2 Bradley infantry fighting vehicle. MICV is one part of the Next Generation Combat Vehicle portfolio of programs.

After the cancellation of the Ground Combat Vehicle in February 2014, the Army's M2 Bradley replacement effort was restarted under the Future Fighting Vehicle (FFV) program. The Army had US$50 million unspent from the GCV program to re-appropriate to the FFV. FFV was a research and development program to develop notional plans for IFVs. A decision on whether to pursue additional development beyond blueprints wasn't expected to come until 2016, according to Brig. Gen David Bassett, commander of PEO Ground Combat Systems.

In June 2023, the Army selected American Rheinmetall Vehicles and General Dynamics Land Systems to go forward in the competition.

== Original competition ==
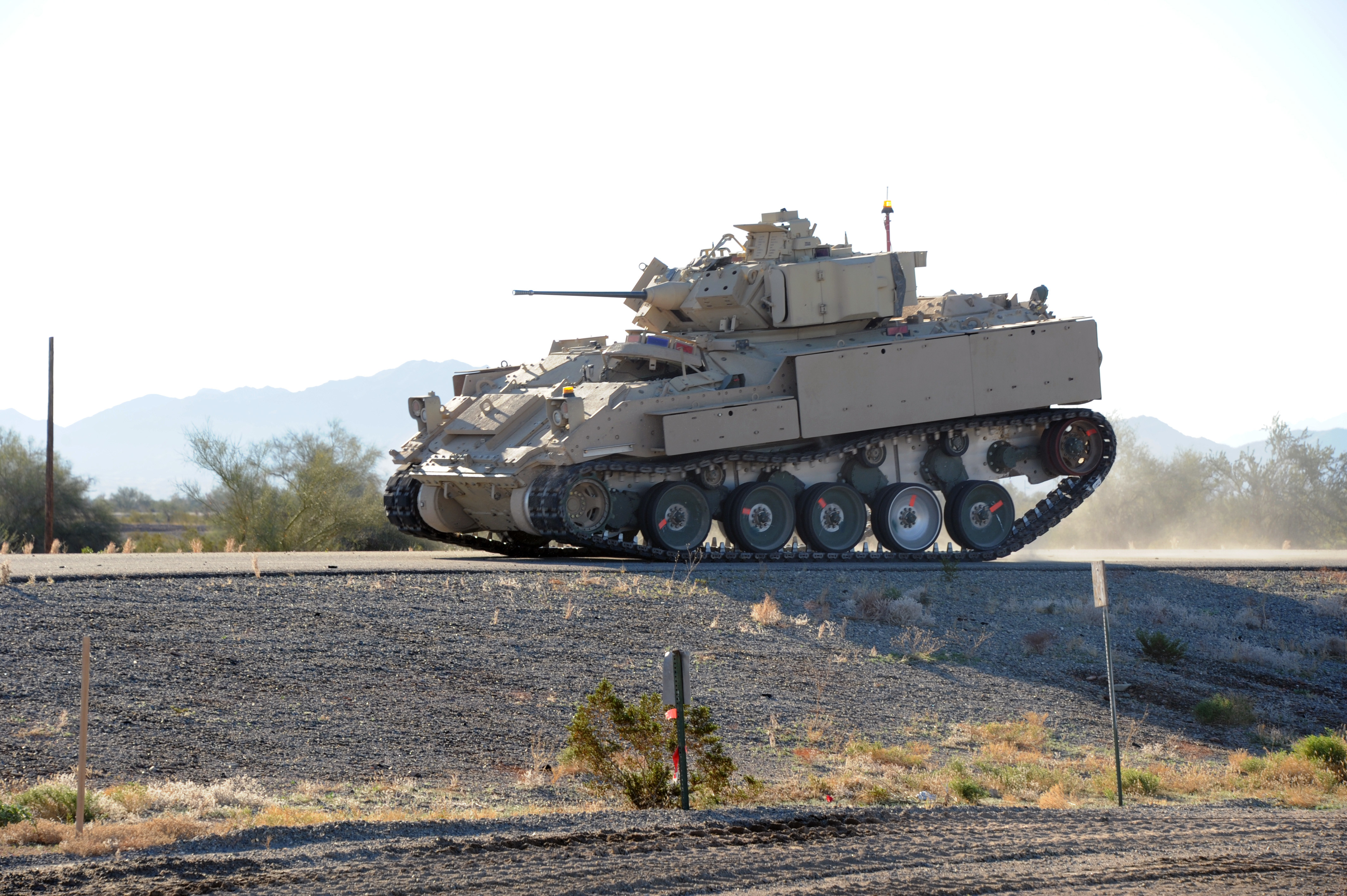
Testing an Advanced Running Gear using a Bradley Fighting Vehicle as a surrogate for the OMFV

In August 2014, General Dynamics Land Systems (GDLS) and BAE Systems Land and Armaments were awarded $7.9 million each to develop technologies from the Ground Combat Vehicle program for the Future Fighting Vehicle. In May 2015, General Dynamics and BAE were awarded a further $28 million. Citing budget constraints, in August 2015, the Army delayed the FFV's acquisition decision from FY2021 to FY2029. The Army said it was choosing to instead work on short-term capability gaps.

In November 2016, Army officials said they were standing up a Next Generation Combat Vehicle program to field a family of combat vehicles by 2035. Officials said this strategy was not necessarily going to be centered around an infantry fighting vehicle, but would likely be a family of vehicles that could potentially replace the M1 Abrams, Bradley Fighting Vehicle, Mobile Protected Firepower and even the Stryker. Army officials conceded that the program was as yet unfunded.

In June 2018, the Army established the Next Generation Combat Vehicle (NGCV) program to replace the M2 Bradley. In October 2018, the program was re-designated as the Optionally Manned Fighting Vehicle (OMFV). The NGCV program was expanded as a portfolio of next-generation vehicles including tanks and the Bradley-based Armored Multi-Purpose Vehicle. In March 2019, the Army issued a request for proposals.

By January 2020, the pool of competitors narrowed down a variant of the Lynx KF41 developed as a joint venture between Raytheon and Rheinmetall, and the Griffin III developed by GDLS, derived from the GDELS ASCOD 2 / GD UK Ajax. The Raytheon-Rheinmetall prototype was disqualified after failing to meet a deadline to ship the prototype to Aberdeen Proving Ground by the required date. The sole remaining competitor, GDLS, was also disqualified because its prototype was too heavy to meet requirements that two fit in a single C-17.

The aggressive pace and stringent objectives of the program were seen as unrealistic by potential competitors. The program placed much of the cost burden of development on private contractors, causing many major contractors to forego participation. Acknowledging this, in February 2020, the Army announced it would restart the program with more responsibility for funding being taken on by the service.

== Phase 2 Contracts Awarded ==
The Army announced the award of five firm-fixed price contracts for XM-30 Phase 2 Concept Design Phase using full and open competitive procedures on July 23, 2021. The contracts were awarded to Point Blank Enterprises, Inc. (Miami Lakes, FL); Oshkosh Defense, LLC (Oshkosh, WI); BAE Systems Land and Armaments L.P. (Sterling Heights, MI); General Dynamics Land Systems, Inc. (Sterling Heights, MI); and American Rheinmetall Vehicles, LLC (Sterling Heights, MI). The total award value for all five contracts was approximately $299.4 million. During this phase, competing firms were asked to develop digital designs. On November 1, 2022, it was reported that all five firms had submitted their XM-30 digital designs prior to the November 1 deadline.

All entries had to meet three general criteria: a tracked vehicle with a hybrid-electric drive; the unmanned XM913 chain gun 50 mm autocannon, or a 30 mm turret with the ability to upgrade to the larger caliber; and a reduced crew of two with space to carry six infantrymen. The Army planned to pick three teams, reduced to two teams upon contract award, to move on to building prototypes by mid-2023.

== Phase 3 and 4 Contracts Awarded ==
On June 26, 2023, the Army announced

[t]he award of two firm-fixed price contracts for the Optionally Manned Fighting Vehicle [XM-30] Phase 3 and 4 Detailed Design and Prototype Build and Testing phases, using full and open competitive procedures. The contracts were awarded to General Dynamics Land Systems Inc. (Sterling Heights, MI) and American Rheinmetall Vehicles LLC (Sterling Heights, MI). The total award value for both contracts is approximately $1.6 billion.

== FY2025 Program Update ==
According to the Department of Defense (DOD) FY 2025 Program Acquisition Costs by Weapons Systems,

The Army anticipates transitioning from [Middle Tier of Acquisition Rapid Prototyping] to a Major Capability Acquisition Pathway at Milestone B in the 2nd quarter of Fiscal Year (FY) 2025 and plans to enter Low-Rate Initial Production (LRIP) in the 1st quarter FY 2028 with a Full Rate Production (FRP) decision slated for FY 2030.

== FY2026 Program Update ==
According to the Department of Defense (DOD) FY 2026 Program Acquisition Costs by Weapons Systems,

The XM30 is an MTA-RP program. Milestone B was approved in June 2025, and Milestone C is targeted for first quarter FY 2028. The Army Transformation Initiative will accelerate this program. [In FY2026 the Army] continues to fund prototype vehicle designs from Preliminary Design Review (PDR) through CDR in preparation for both physical prototype builds and tests.

== XM-30 Preliminary Design Review (PDR) ==
Reportedly, General Dynamics Land Systems and American Rheinmetall Vehicles completed their PDR in August 2024 and, after a critical design review, development of physical prototypes was planned to begin. According to Defense News,

Prototypes will take 18 to 20 months to construct after the critical design reviews wrap up. Once prototypes are delivered, the Army will move into a test and evaluation phase with both competitors before deciding on a winner in FY2027. The first vehicles are expected to be fielded in FY2029.

== Milestone B Decision ==
In June 2025, the U.S. Army reportedly approved Milestone B for the XM-30 program, advancing it into the engineering manufacturing development phase after both competitors completed critical design reviews. However, in February 2026, Army leadership reportedly opted not to sign documentation finalizing the Milestone B decision to avoid locking the service into a specific design or a slow acquisition path, effectively pausing formal program transition and prompting a reevaluation of the program's approach.

== XM-30 Milestone B Pause and a New Request for Information (RFI) ==
According to the February 2026 report, the Chief of Staff of the Army, General Randy George, and the Secretary of the Army, Dan Driscoll, decided not to sign off on the Milestone B decision "to leave the door open to a major reworking of the XM-30 Mechanized Infantry Combat Vehicle program." Reportedly, regarding the pause, an Army spokesman stated:

We are actively assessing multiple, competing designs for the XM-30 to foster a truly competitive environment. We continue to look for partners who can deliver cutting-edge solutions now, not decades from now. This is a deliberate and necessary step to ensure we assess and select the best approach to deliver a world class vehicle today and into the future.

A February 18, 2026, Request for Information (RFI) for Ground Combat Vehicle Production, while not specifically mentioning replacing the XM-30 or Bradley, seeks "information from industry partners to explore innovative solutions for the rapid design, production, and delivery of ground combat vehicles." It was reportedly suggested such an action by Army leadership could serve to put pressure on the current XM-30 developers to accelerate the program and also open the program to existing fighting vehicle designs.

== See also ==
- Armored Systems Modernization, 1980s–1990s U.S. Army family of combat vehicles concept
- Ground Combat Vehicle, a U.S. Army infantry fighting vehicle acquisition program canceled in 2014
- M1296 Dragoon, an infantry carrier vehicle of the Stryker family
- Armored Multi-Purpose Vehicle, a U.S. Army acquisition program to replace the M113 APC
