= M1126 infantry carrier vehicle =

Armored personnel carrier

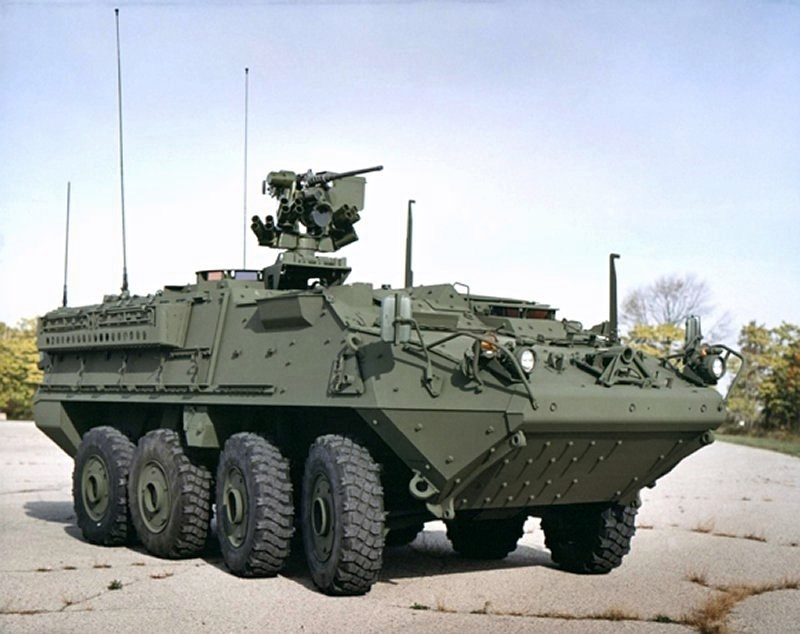
- Stryker ICV, c. 2004
- Type: Armored personnel carrier

Service history
- Used by: United States Army; Ukrainian Ground Forces
- Wars: War in Afghanistan; Iraq War; Russo-Ukrainian War; Russian invasion of Ukraine; 2025 Cambodia-Thailand conflict

Specifications
- Mass: 16.47 tonnes (18.12 short tons; 16.21 long tons)
- Length: 6.95 m (22 ft 10 in)
- Width: 2.72 m (8 ft 11 in)
- Height: 2.64 m (8 ft 8 in)
- Crew: 2+9
- Armor: 14.5 mm resistant
- Main armament: 0.5 inch (12.7 mm) M2 Browning machine gun or 40 mm Mk 19 grenade launcher or four M6 smoke grenade launchers mounted in a Protector remote weapon station (ICV)
- Secondary armament: .50-inch M2 MG and 7.62 mm M240 machine gun (MGS)
- Engine: diesel 260 kW (350 hp)
- Power/weight: ICV: 15.8 kW/t (19.3 hp/sh tn)
- Suspension: 8×8 wheeled with hydrostrut leaf spring
- Operational range: 180 km (110 mi)
- Maximum speed: 100 km/h (62 mph)

The M1126 infantry carrier vehicle (ICV) is an armored personnel carrier and part of the Stryker family of vehicles (derived from the Canadian LAV III 8x8) used by the United States Army and Royal Thai Army. Models with the double V-hull upgrade are known as the M1256 ICVV.

== General ==
The infantry carrier vehicle provides protected transport and, during dismounted assault, supporting fire for the infantry squad. The Stryker is a full-time four-wheel drive, selectively eight-wheel drive, armored vehicle weighing approximately 19t which carries an infantry squad with their equipment. On paved roads the vehicle can attain speeds of 62 miles per hour (100 km/h) without a governor and 35 miles per hour (56 km/h) with a governor.

The basic infantry carrier vehicle (ICV) provides armored protection for the two-man crew and a squad of nine soldiers.

== Digital communications system ==
The vehicle's commander has a Force XXI Battle Command Brigade and Below (FBCB2) digital communications system that allows communication between vehicles through text messaging and a map network, as well as with the battalion. The map shows the position of all vehicles on the battlefield and the commander can mark the position of enemy forces on the map, which can then be seen by other commanders.

== Armament ==
The M1126 ICV has a Protector remote weapon station with a universal soft mount cradle, which can mount either a .50 caliber M2 Browning machine gun, a 40mm MK19 grenade launcher or a 7.62×51mm NATO M240 machine gun. It is also armed with four M6 smoke grenade launchers.

Army officials plan to up-gun Stryker ICVs with a 30 mm cannon in a Kongsberg Protech Systems' Medium Caliber Remote Weapons Station (MCRWS), which does not extend into the crew compartment and take up space and can be loaded from inside. Test firings occurred on a Stryker demonstrator on 19 February 2014, showing increased lethality and accuracy over the standard .50-caliber machine gun at ranges from 600-1,550 meters; the 30 mm cannon is capable of hitting targets over 2,000 meters away.

After comparative testing of the Kongsberg MCRWS mounted to Strykers, the U.S. Army approved on 22 April 2015 the equipping of 81 of the 2nd Cavalry Regiment's Strykers with 30 mm Mk44 Bushmaster II cannons following a lethality upgrade request to increase lethality against other light armor vehicles while preserving its wheeled mobility advantages. The first upgraded ICV, designated XM1296 "Dragoon", was delivered for testing on 27 October 2016, with fielding to begin in May 2018. The first infantry carrier vehicle Dragoon (ICVD) was delivered to the 2CR in Germany on 8 December 2017.

In April 2019, the Army decided to add cannon armament to three additional brigades of Stryker DVH ICVVA1 vehicles.

== Gallery ==
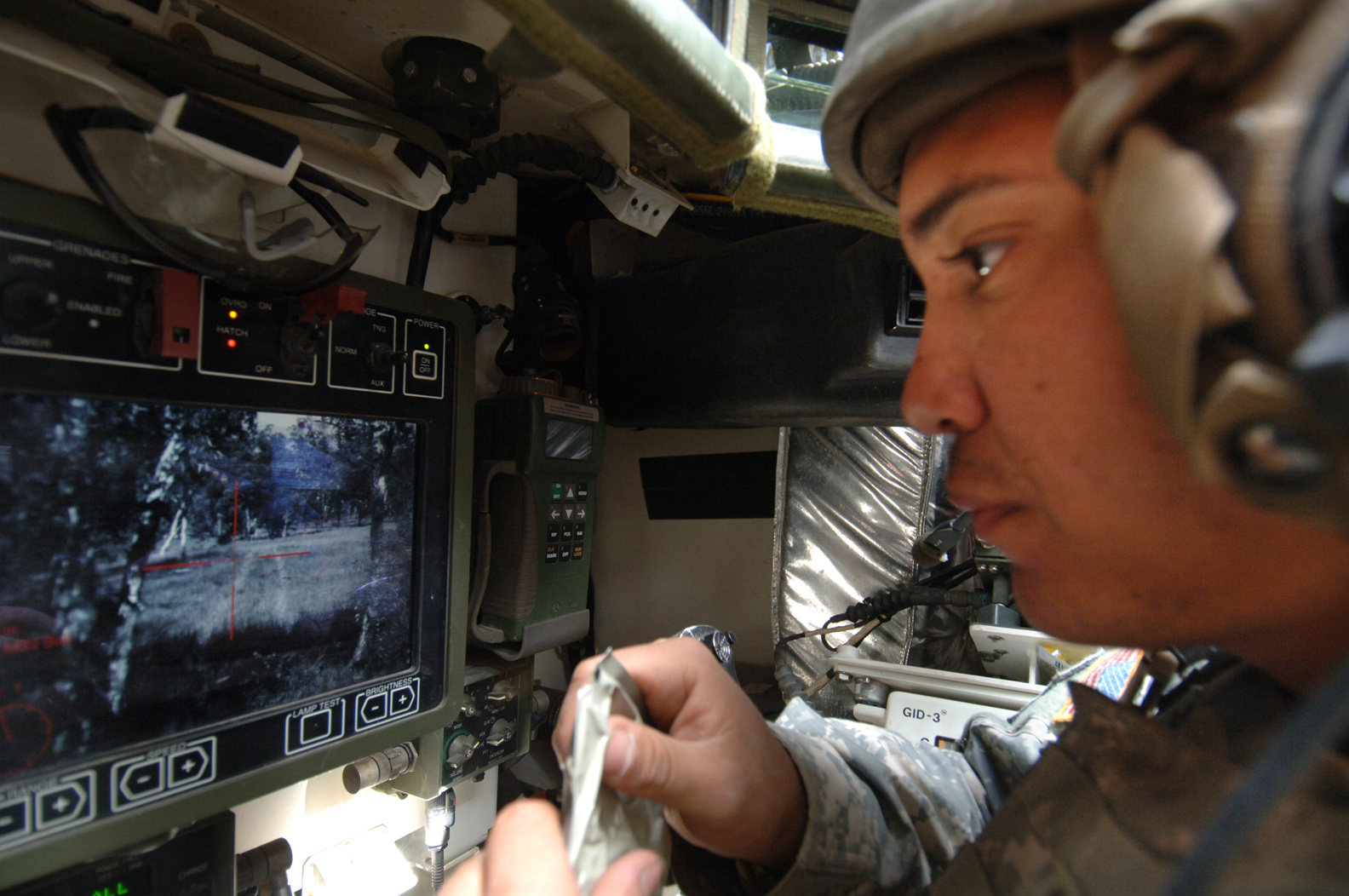
Interior control station for Protector M151 Remote Weapon Station in Stryker ICV

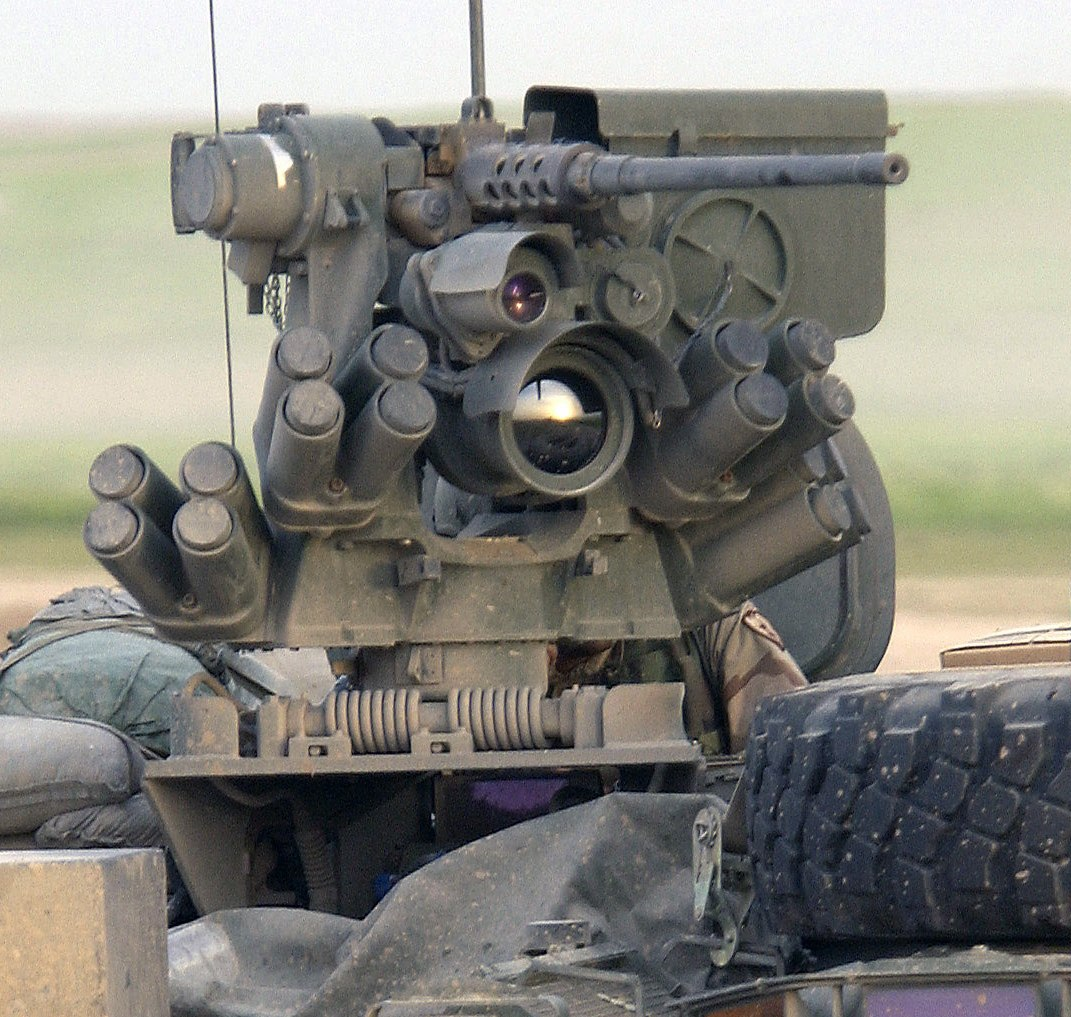
Remote Weapon Station on Stryker ICV

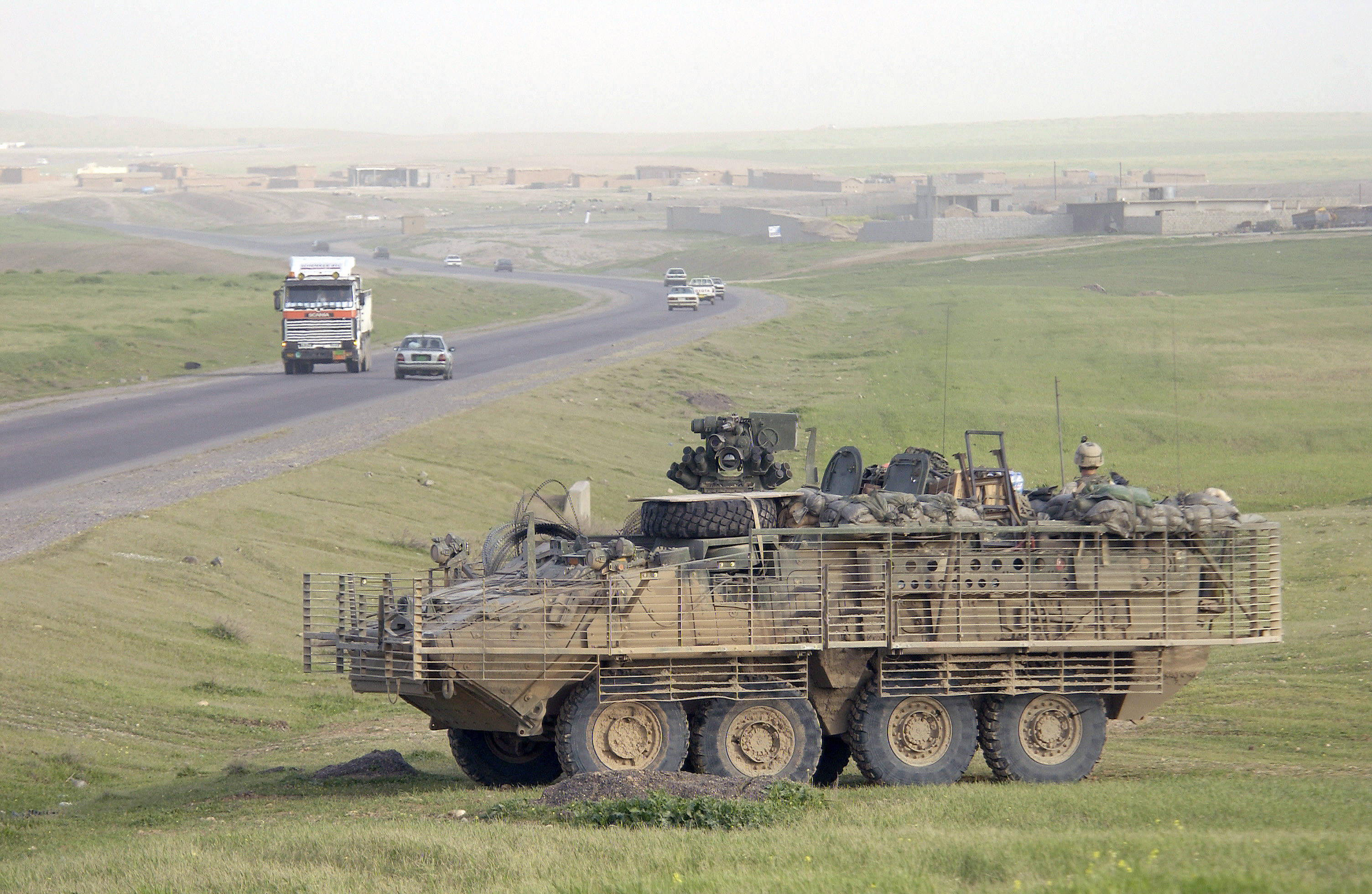
Stryker ICV on patrol in Iraq

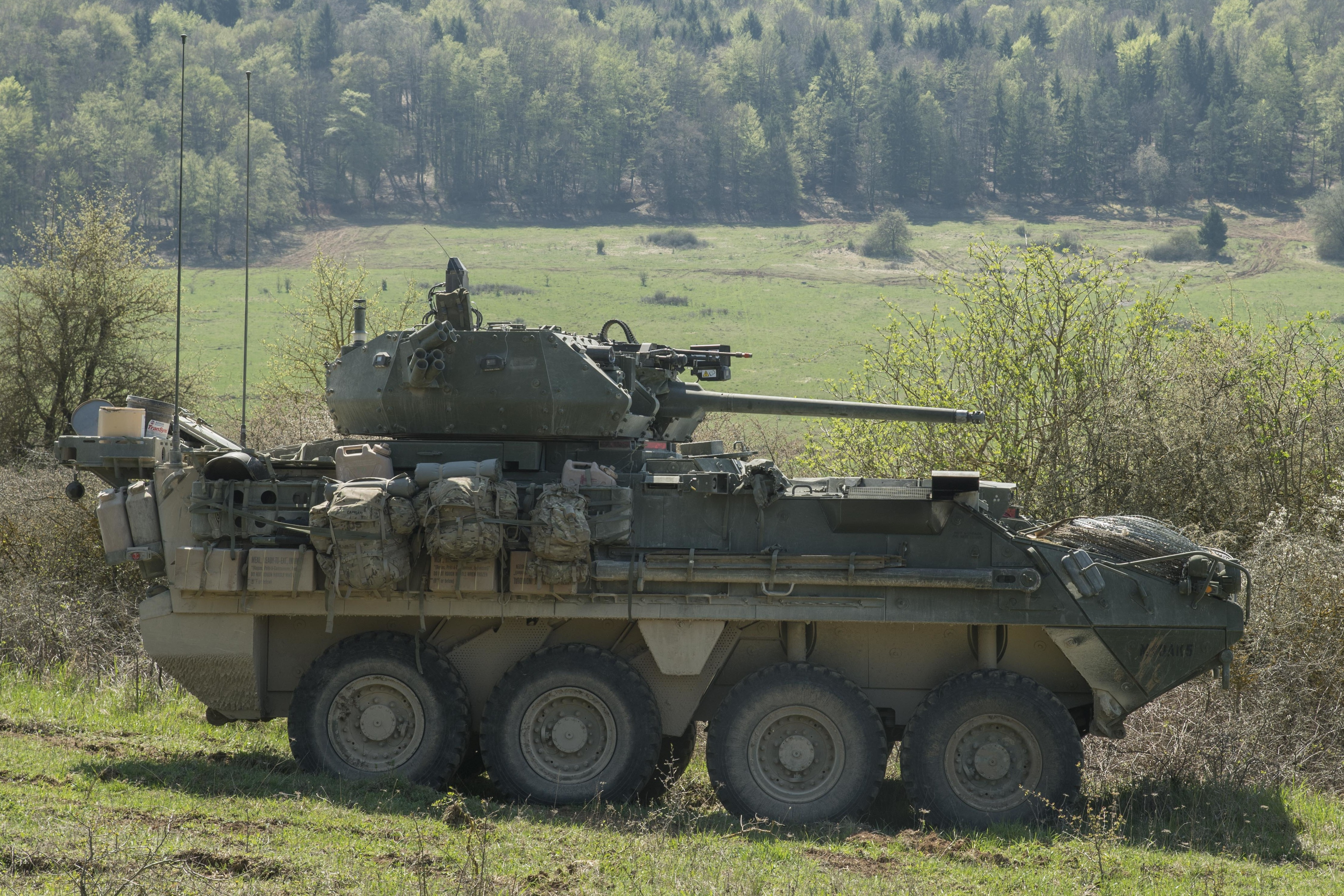
An infantry carrier vehicle Dragoon (ICVD) during the ICVD/common remote weapons station Javelin missile (CROWS-J) operational test

== See also ==
- M2 Bradley
- Armored Multi-Purpose Vehicle, a U.S. Army APC development program
- Future Combat Systems Manned Ground Vehicles, a U.S. Army family of armored fighting vehicles canceled in 2009
- Ground Combat Vehicle, a U.S. Army infantry fighting vehicle canceled in 2014
- Freccia IFV
