= Armored Multi-Purpose Vehicle =

Program of United States Army

BAE Armored Multi-Purpose Vehicle
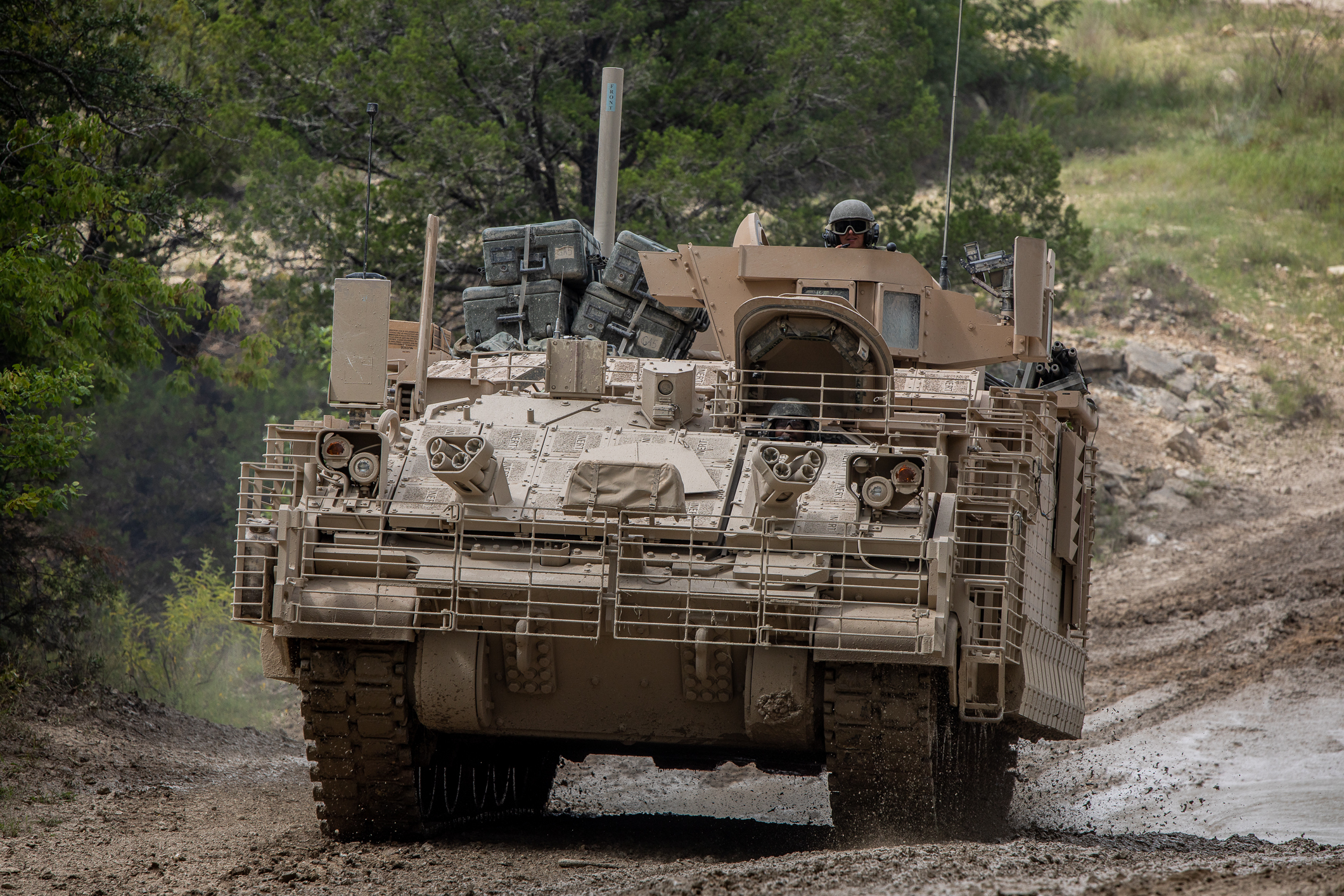
- AMPV field tests at Fort Hood, Texas
- Type: Tracked armoured fighting vehicle
- Place of origin: United States

Service history
- Used by: United States Army

Production history
- Manufacturer: BAE Systems Inc.
- Developed from: M2 Bradley
- Unit cost: US$2.51 million in 2020
- Produced: Since 2018
- No. built: Ordered by the US Army: 29 prototypes; 551 in LRIP (low-rate initial production); Planned for the US Army: 2,907
- Variants: M1283 general purpose (APC); M1284 medical evacuation vehicle (790 planned); M1285 medical treatment vehicle (216 planned); M1286 mission command (993 planned); M1287 mortar carrier vehicle (386 planned)

Specifications
- Mass: 36 t (79,000 lb)(GVM)
- Length: 6.00 m (236 in) (for the general purpose variant - APC)
- Width: 3.70 m (146 in)
- Height: 3.10 m (122 in)
- Engine: Cummins VTA903E-T675; 504 kW (676 hp)
- Transmission: Renk HMPT 800
- Ground clearance: 0.40 m (16 in)
- Operational range: 362 km (225 mi)
- Maximum speed: 61 km/h (38 mph)

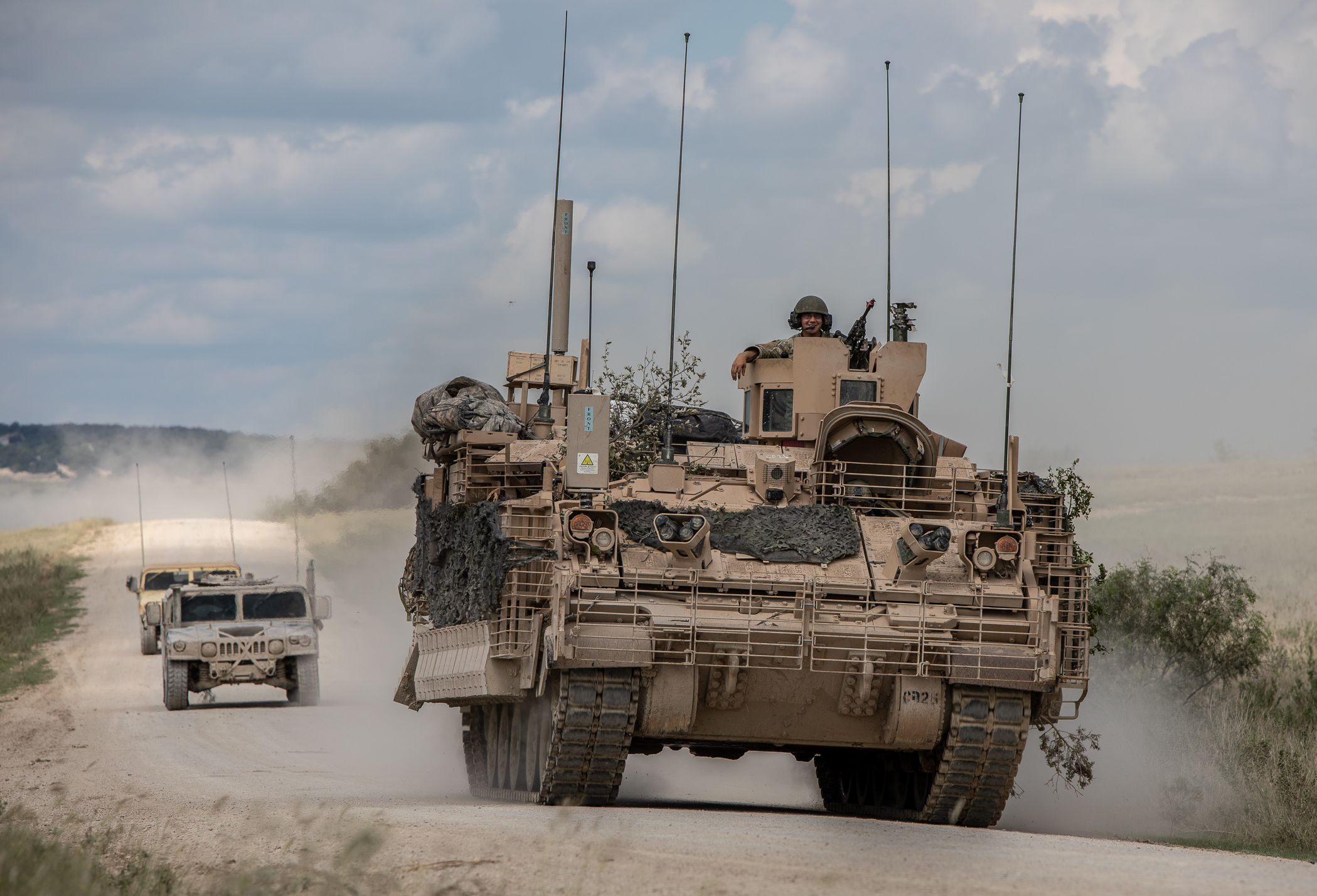
Soldiers from 4th Squadron (Dark Horse), 9th Cavalry Regiment, 2nd Armored Brigade Combat Team, 1st Cavalry Division, complete field testing of the Armored Multi-Purpose Vehicle at Fort Hood, Texas, 2018

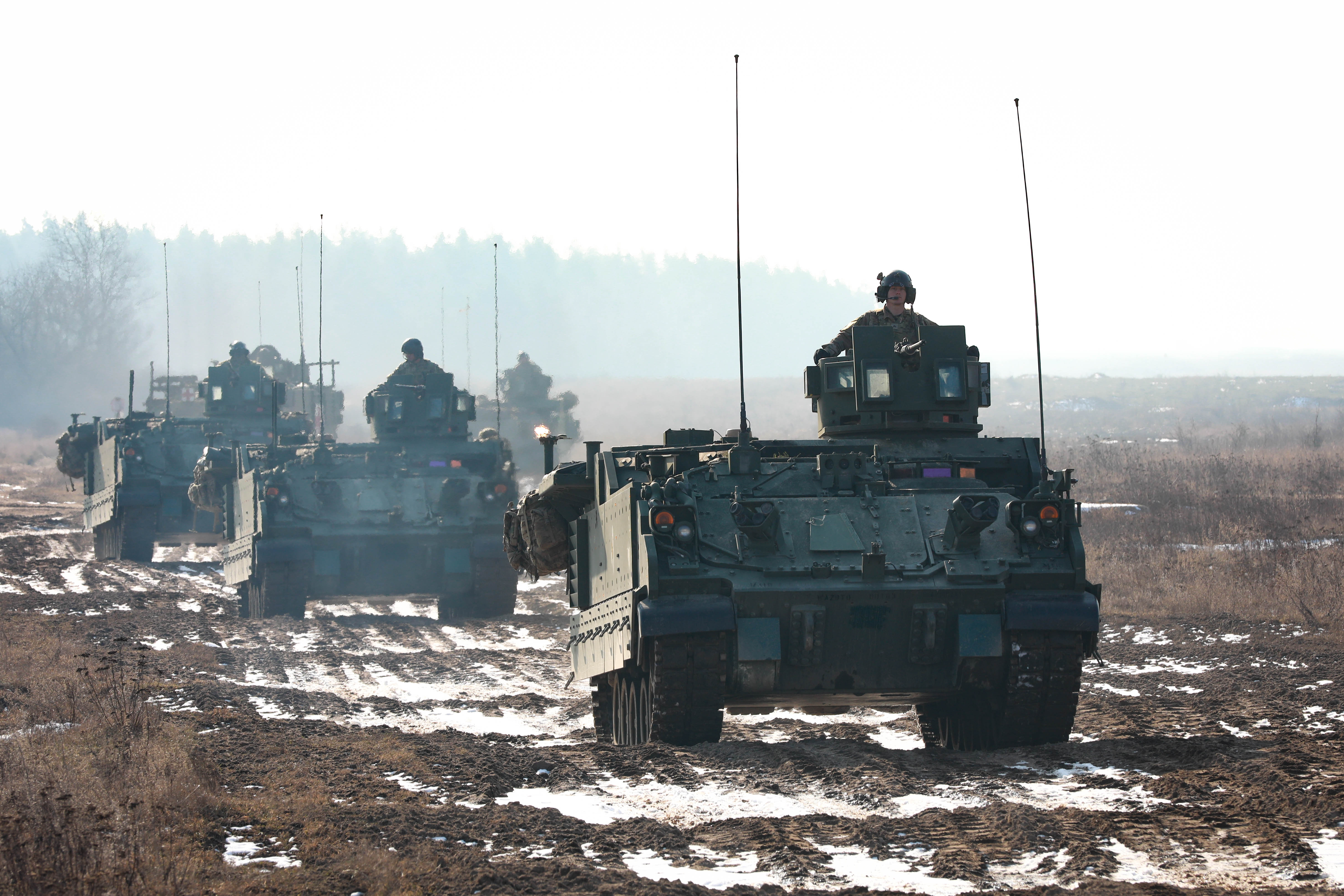
Armored Multi-Purpose Vehicle (AMPV)

The Armored Multi-Purpose Vehicle (AMPV) is an American armored fighting vehicle that is replacing the M113 armored personnel carrier and family of vehicles in U.S. Army service. The AMPV was designed and produced by BAE Systems, and is based on the Bradley Fighting Vehicle.

As of 2013, five variants of the 2,907 AMPV are planned:

- M1283 general purpose (522 planned)
- M1284 medical evacuation vehicle (790 planned)
- M1285 medical treatment vehicle (216 planned)
- M1286 mission command (993 planned)
- M1287 mortar carrier vehicle (386 planned)

The first AMPV prototype was rolled out in December 2016 Following a competitive bidding process, the first production vehicles were delivered 2020. In 2023 the AMPV entered full-rate initial production.

== Rationale ==
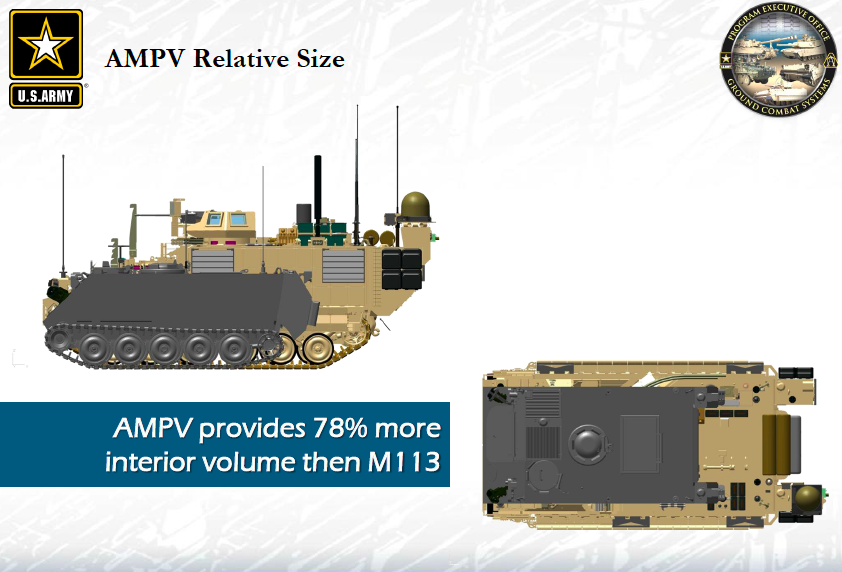
The AMPV has 78% more interior volume compared to the M113 armored personnel carrier

The M113 has been in service since the early 1960s and while able to take on various roles, has proven too vulnerable for combat. In the 1980s, the M2 Bradley replaced the M113 in the front-line transport role, moving it to rear-area roles. In the Iraq War, urban warfare tactics still defeated the M113, leading it to be almost entirely replaced in active service by Mine-Resistant Ambush Protected Vehicles (MRAP). MRAPs were useful on the roads of Iraq, but have less payload capacity and worse off-road performance. The AMPV aims to find a vehicle more versatile and mobile against a wide range of adversaries while having off-road mobility comparable to Bradleys and M1 Abrams tanks.

Some reports suggested that the AMPV program was being favored over the Ground Combat Vehicle (GCV) program. While procurement of the AMPV fleet would cost over $5 billion, the Government Accountability Office estimates the GCV fleet would cost $37 billion. In April 2013, the Congressional Budget Office said the AMPV would be a better buy because analysts have asserted that the vehicles the GCV is slated to replace should not be first. The GCV was to replace 61 M2 Bradley infantry fighting vehicles in each armored combat brigade, making up 18 percent of the 346 armored combat vehicles in each armored brigade.

A September 2013 Congressional Research Service report suggested that given budgetary constraints, the GCV program may be unrealistic, and that one potential discussion could focus on a decision by the Army to replace the GCV with the AMPV as their number one ground combat vehicle acquisition priority. The Army FY 2015 budget proposal suggests canceling the GCV program and moving funds to the AMPV as the service's priority vehicle program.

In order to keep development costs down, the Army is requiring the vehicle be a commercial off-the-shelf design that can be incrementally improved. The vehicle would have new technologies including electronics, networking, and communications gear added onto the platform as they become available later. If the AMPV can incorporate newer satellite communications as they are developed, they could be linked to other ground vehicles that would normally require a complete subsystems overhaul for new gear after a certain number of years. The operational maintenance cost requirement of the AMPV is up to $90 per mile, compared to $58 per mile for the M113.

== History ==
In March 2013, the Army issued a draft request for proposals (RFP) for the AMPV. The RFP proposed a $1.46 billion contract for design and development phases. The engineering and manufacturing development (EMD) phase would build 29 prototypes over four years from 2014 through 2017 for $388 million. Low-rate initial production (LRIP) would be from 2018 to 2020 at $1.08 billion for 289 production models. After 2020, the Army planned to buy another 2,618 vehicles over ten years for a total of 2,907 AMPVs. Cost per vehicle is not to exceed $1.8 million, totalling $4.7 billion for the entire fleet.

In October 2013, the Army released a new draft RFP, delaying the start of the program by one year and raising the development costs by several hundred million dollars. The new document said the Army planned to award a five-year EMD contract in May 2014 to one contractor, which will manufacture 29 vehicles for government testing, followed by a three-year LRIP contract starting in 2020. The EMD phase was extended from FY 2015 to FY 2019, and raised the cost to build 29 prototypes to $458 million.

Expenditures for three years of LRIP for 289 vehicles were $244 million the first year, $479 million the second year, and $505 million the third year, totaling an increase to $1.2 billion for low-rate production. The AMPV will cost $1.68 billion before full-rate production begins, an increase from $1.46 billion previously. The new draft did not change the total number of vehicles desired and does not include an average unit manufacturing cost. Congress approved $116 million for the program in the Army's FY 2014 budget.

The AMPV has a relatively long production schedule for a non-developmental vehicle of 13 years: 3 years for low-rate production and 10 years for full-rate production. The production plan was partly based on budgetary constraints, but also to be able to speed up production in the event of war or another contingency. 33 percent of an Armored Brigade Combat Team (ABCT) is made up of M113s, which are not used in combat operations because they are less mobile and poorly protected than other combat vehicles in an ABCT. Full-rate production should build just under 300 AMPV vehicles per year, but the ability is there to quickly increase production if an ABCT needed to deploy to combat. Letting industry build as fast as possible regularly only to stop it later is seen as irresponsible.

In November 2013, the Army released the official AMPV EMD phase RFP. Despite sequestration budget cuts, the program is maintaining its previously stated goal of 2,907 vehicles at $1.8 million each, built over 13 years. A 5-year EMD contract was to be awarded to one manufacturer in May 2014 to produce 29 vehicles for testing. Although the October draft RFP raised the cost of the EMD phase to $458 million, the official November RFP lowered it to $436 million.

Annual expenditures for the EMD phase are $70 million in FY 2015, $174 million in FY 2016, $114 million in FY 2017, $64 million in FY 2018, and $14 million in FY 2019. The RFP also contains an Optional Exchange Vehicle (OEV) program to exchange up to 78 vehicles during the EMD phase for AMPVs. 39 Bradley vehicles of versions previous to the current M2A3/M3A3 configurations and 39 M113s not including the M113 AMEV can be exchanged by the government to the contractor for credit.

=== RFP issues ===
In February 2014, General Dynamics filed a protest with the Army Materiel Command on grounds that the AMPV requirements had been written to favor a chassis based on the BAE Systems Bradley Fighting Vehicle, making it more difficult for their Stryker designs or other foreign designs to compete in the program. They cite the option of using excess Bradleys as optional exchange vehicles, which is difficult for a competitor not offering the chassis, the Army not providing performance data on Bradley components outside of BAE, which they could use to develop a tracked offering, and mobility requirements that exclude wheeled vehicles, which call for a vehicle that can go 100 percent of places the M113 is able to, including very soft ground.

BAE said the Army's changed mobility requirements from a zero turning radius to a larger turning radius that could accommodate a wheeled design and that requirements do not specify a Bradley-based vehicle because a pure Bradley solution would not meet them; the AMPV's survivability requirements are higher than that of an M2 equipped with the Bradley Urban Survival Kit (BUSK) III.

The Army Materiel Command denied General Dynamics' protest in April 2014. Their response was that although BAE had an advantage being the manufacturers of the Bradley and M113, the government was not required to neutralize that and that does not constitute preferential treatment. Regarding OEVs, the Army Materiel Command clarified that they may not specifically be used for conversion but could still be exchanged for foreign sales or be scrapped, which would be less cost-effective. General Dynamics could have gone to the Government Accountability Office with its protest, or simply withdraw from the competition. In April 2014, General Dynamics released a statement saying they wouldn't file a protest with the GAO, but would still be engaged in talks with Congress and the Department of Defense. AMPV proposals were due by 28 May 2014.

=== Vehicle submissions ===
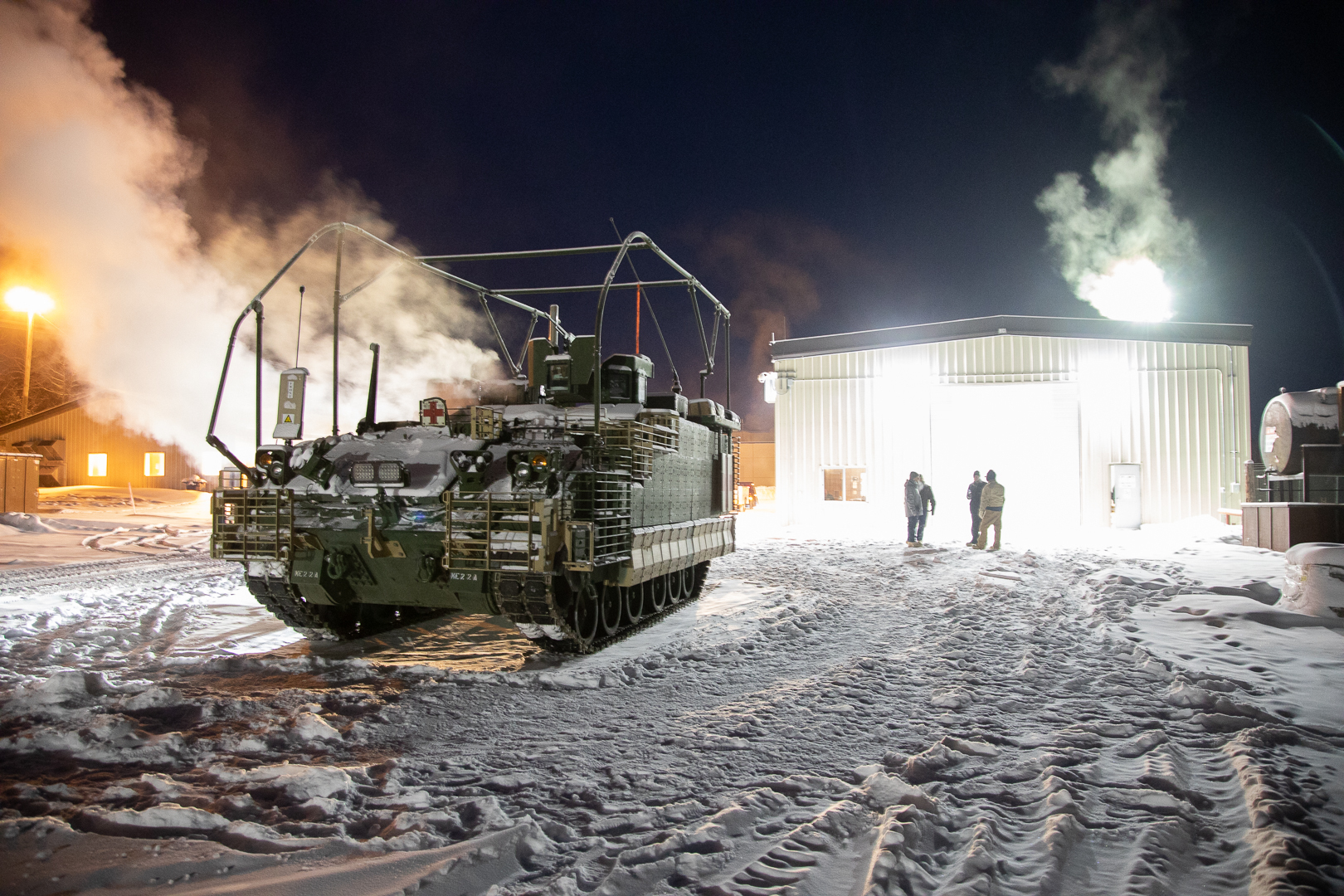
The AMPV at the U.S. Army Cold Regions Test Center

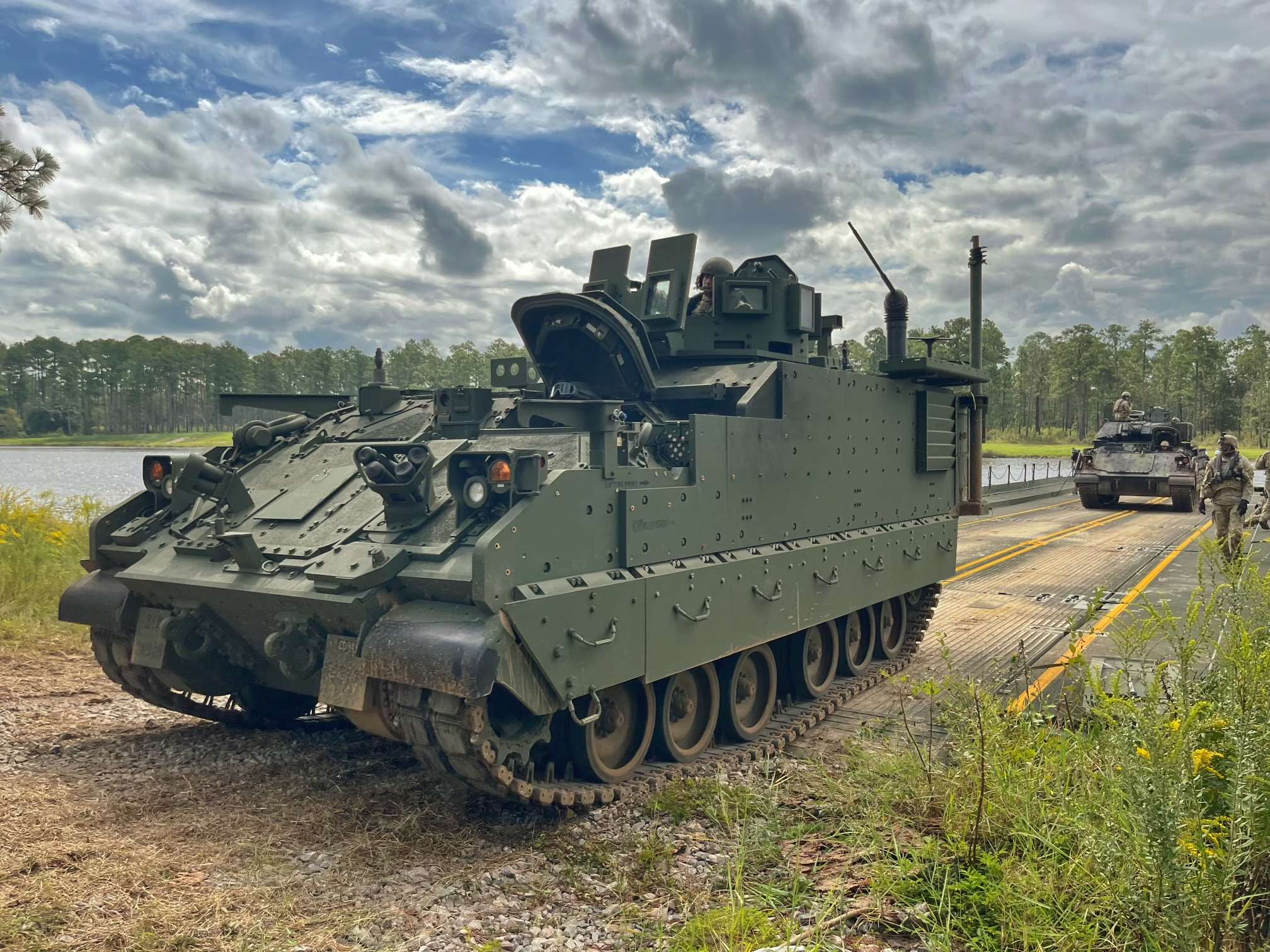
A 3rd ID's AMPV drives off of a 497th Multi-Role Bridge Company, 92nd Engineer Battalion barge during a wet-gap crossing exercise on Fort Stewart's Pineview Lake, September 2023.

In May 2014, BAE Systems submitted their proposal for the AMPV competition. Their submission was based on the Bradley and Paladin Integrated Management designs to meet the force protection and all-terrain mobility requirements with maximum commonality within the family of vehicles. The BAE AMPV team includes: DRS Technologies for power management, distribution, and integration; Northrop Grumman for Mission Command Mission Equipment Package design and integration; Air Methods Corporation for medical evacuation and treatment subsystems; and the Red River Army Depot for vehicle teardown and component remanufacture.

=== Split buy proposal ===
The FY2015 National Defense Authorization Act legislative language called for further examination of the use of wheeled AMPV variants at both echelons above brigade (EAB) as well as for medical evacuation purposes.

General Dynamics had lobbied for a split buy, arguing that a split buy of its Strykers would save the Army $2 billion in life cycle costs and that it is smoother and quicker than a tracked vehicle in the role. Navistar Defense also advocated this approach, offering its MaxxPro MRAP to fulfill part of the AMPV role..

In a March 2015 report the Army told Congress that wheeled medical vehicles are unsuitable for ABCTs due to the inability to maneuver with highly mobile combat vehicles. For medical evacuations, tracked vehicle's superior mobility better enables it to retrieve wounded soldiers. The requirements were for a vehicle that could go wherever the tracked vehicles of an armored brigade went, which would include rough terrain and soft ground that a wheeled vehicle could get bogged down in, preventing an armored ambulance from reaching wounded soldiers in time. Using BAE's Bradley-based chassis allows for commonality between 75 percent of an armored brigade's combat vehicles, easing maintenance and logistics and ensuring the vehicles have comparable mobility.

=== EMD ===
In December 2014, BAE Systems was awarded a $383 million contract to begin the Engineering, Manufacturing, and Development (EMD) phase of the AMPV program. The initial award is for a 52-month base term, to produce 29 vehicles across each of the variants. It contains the option to begin Low-Rate Initial Production (LRIP) immediately following the EMD's conclusion to produce an additional 289 vehicles for the total contract value of $1.2 billion.

The vehicles are to move as rapidly as the primary combat vehicles in an ABCT during unified land operations over multiple terrain sets with superior force protection, survivability, and mobility than the M113. They will support the M1 Abrams and M2/M3 Bradley to resupply the formation, conduct battle command functions, deliver organic indirect fires, provide logistics support and medical treatment, and perform medical and casualty evacuation to function as an integral part of the ABCT formation.

=== Production ===
The first production vehicles were delivered August 2020. In March 2023, the U.S. Army delivered the first AMPVs to the 1st Armored Brigade Combat Team, 3rd Infantry Division at Fort Stewart, Georgia. In August 2023, the AMPV entered full-rate initial production.

== Variants ==
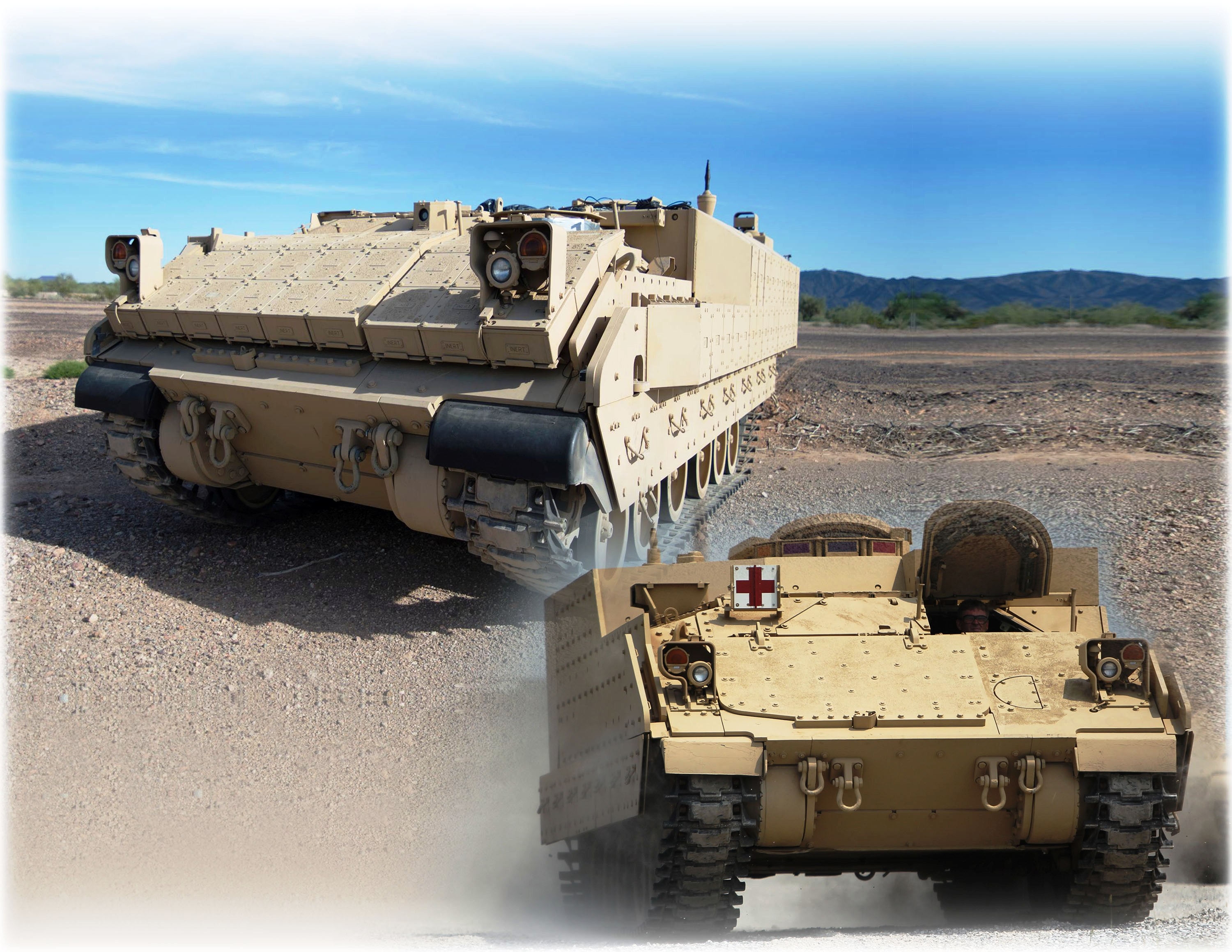
The general purpose and medical evacuation vehicle variants of the AMPV

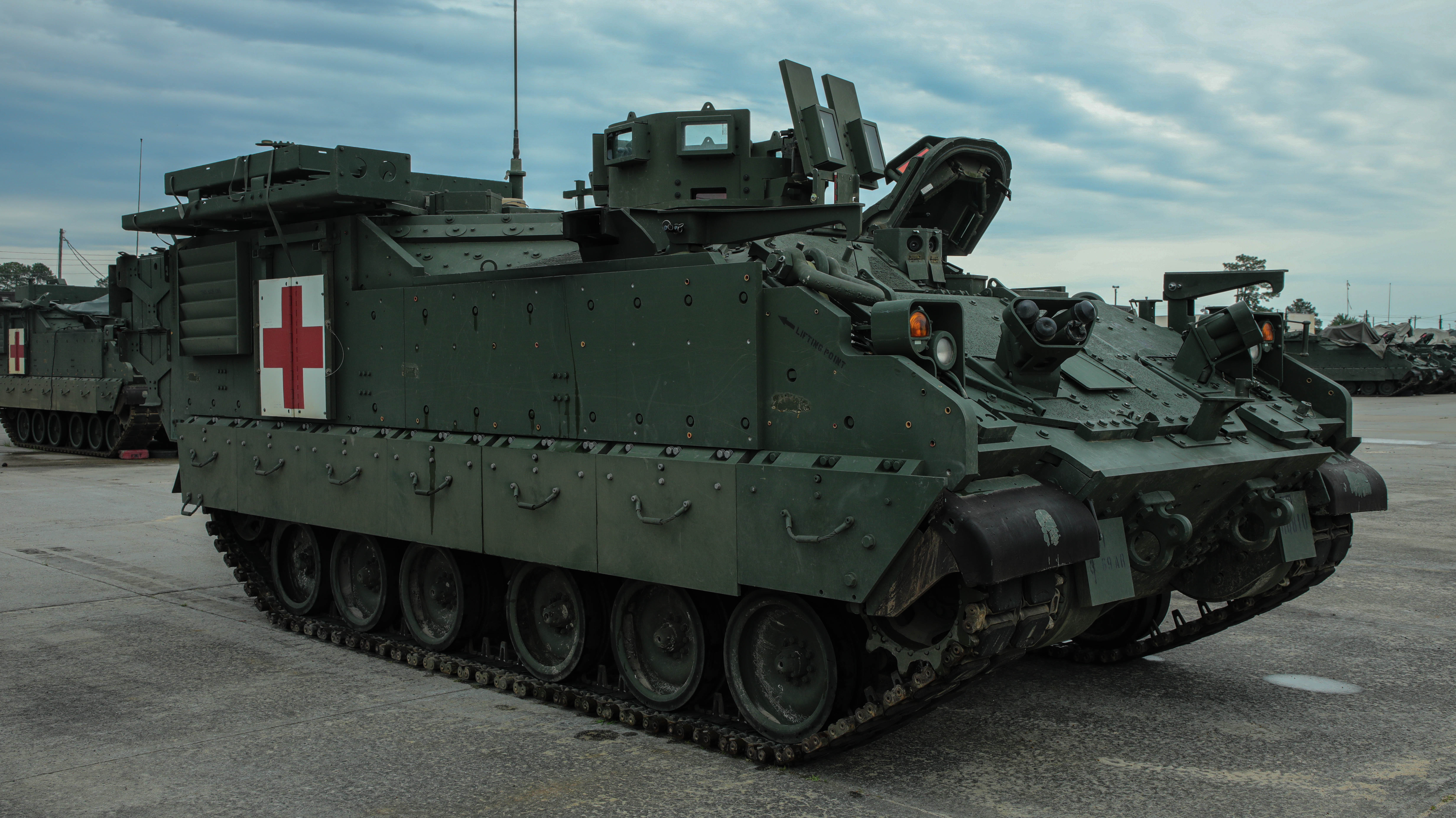
M1285 Medical Treatment Vehicle.

There are to be five versions of the AMPV:

=== US Army variants ===
==== M1283 general purpose (GP) ====
This variant replaces the M113A3 APC. Requirements are for 2 crew and 4 troops, be configured to carry one litter, and mount a crew served weapon. Tasks include conducting logistics package escort, emergency resupply, casualty evacuation, and security for medical evacuation and 522 vehicles are planned.

==== M1284 medical evacuation vehicle (MEV) ====
This variant replaces the M113 AMEV. Requirements are for 3 crew and able to have either 6 ambulatory patients, 4 litter patients, or 3 ambulatory patients and 2 litter patients. It must also have medical equipment sets and environmental cooling. Tasks include conducting medical evacuation from the point of injury to an aid station and medical resupply replenishment and 790 vehicles are planned.

==== M1285 medical treatment vehicle (MTV) ====
This variant replaces the M577A4 medical vehicle. Requirements are for 4 crew and one litter patient, as well as medical equipment sets and environmental cooling. Tasks include serving as the forward aid station, main aid station, and battalion aid station and 216 vehicles are planned.

==== M1286 Mission Command (MCmd) ====
This variant replaces the M1068A3 command post carrier. Requirements are for 2 crew, 2 operators, and a mount for a crew served weapon. The task is to serve as a command post and 993 vehicles are planned.

This variant intends to become the cornerstone of the Army's ABCT Network Modernization Strategy.

==== XM1287 mortar carrier vehicle (MCV) ====
This variant replaces the M1064A3 mortar carrier. Requirements are for 2 crew and 2 mortar crew, with a 120 mm mortar and 69 mortar rounds. The task is to provide indirect mortar fire and 386 vehicles are planned. In 2024, trials of the AMPV equipped with a Patria NEMO mortar turret took place in Fort Moore, Georgia.

==== AMPV 30mm ====
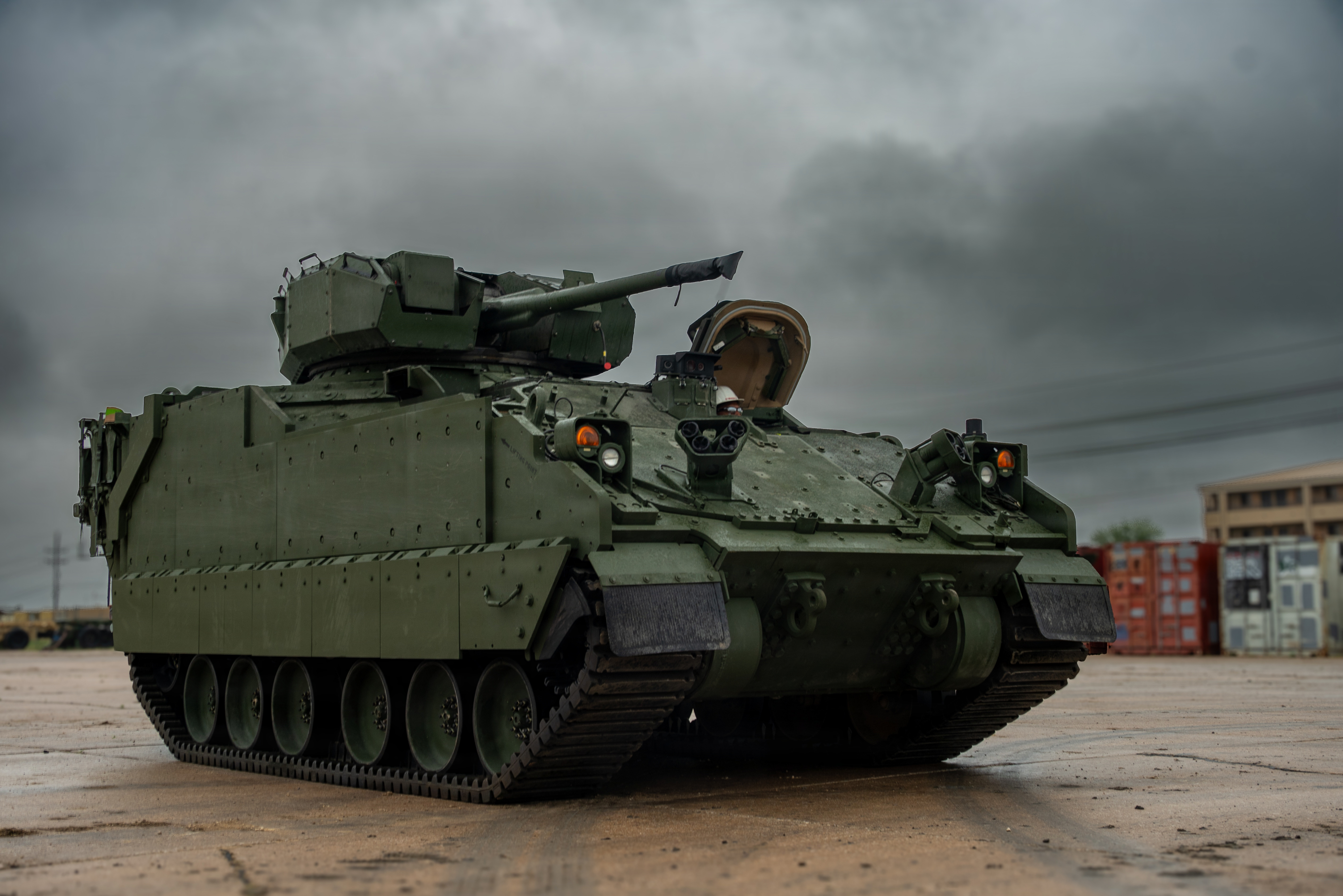
AMPV 30mm

In April 2026, the 1st Cavalry Division fielded the new AMPV 30mm at Fort Hood, Texas. The AMPV 30mm is equipped with the Kongsberg MCT-30, a remotely operated, unmanned turret. It allows the crew to control the weapon from within the vehicle’s protected hull, reducing their exposure to enemy fire. The unmanned design also removes the need for a turret basket, freeing up internal space.

The 30mm autocannon enables the AMPV to engage lightly armored vehicles and fortified positions and can use programmable airburst ammunition to target small drones and unarmored ground threats. This capability allows the vehicle to provide more direct support to maneuver units, rather than operating solely in support or rear-echelon roles.

=== Variants proposed by BAE Systems ===
==== C-UAS ====
In 2024, BAE Systems revealed a variant of the AMPV with a C-UAS turret, the Leonardo M-SHORAD.

==== Engineering vehicle ====
An internal BAE project in collaboration with the US Army to develop an engineer vehicle to replace M113's in that role at Echelons Above Brigade (EAB).

==== Infantry fighting vehicle ====
In October 2024, BAE Systems presented a variant with a remote controlled turret Kongsberg Protector RT20 (30 mm).

== Operators ==
=== Current operators ===
- USA

==== Prototyping phase ====
Orders (29):
- December 2016, contract for 29 prototypes at a value of US$388 million. This contract includes an option for 289 low-rate initial production for US$1.2 billion.
Deliveries:
- All 29 prototypes were delivered by March 2018 (5 months delay to target)

==== LRIP phase (Low-rate initial production) - 551 AMPV ====
In December 2018, the AMPV program was approved to move into the "Production and Deployment phase" of the acquisition. As part of this milestone, the production in LRIP would start. Low Rate Initial Production rates would be 12 vehicles per month with this rising to a maximum of 17 vehicles per month during Full Rate Production.

LRIP orders (551 AMPV):
- LRIP option year 1, US$298 million (42 AMPV):
  - FY 2018, 42 AMPV
- LRIP option year 2 (245 AMPV):
  - LRIP option year 2A, awarded in January 2019 US$128 million
    - FY 2018, 28 AMPV
    - FY 2019, 37 AMPV
  - LRIP option year 2B, awarded in February 2019, US$447 million
    - FY 2018, 86 AMPV
    - FY 2019, 94 AMPV
- LRIP option year 3 awarded in January 2020, US$400.91 million (160 AMPV):
  - FY 2019, 67 AMPV
  - FY 2020, 93 AMPV
- Follow-on orders (104 AMPV):
  - FY 2020, awarded in April 2022, 28 AMPV
  - FY2021, awarded in April 2022, 32 AMPV
  - Awarded in April 2024, US$119.6 million, 44 AMPV
LRIP deliveries milestones:
- 160 as of October 2022
- 367 as of May 2023
- Estimated 390 M1283 AMPV GP (including command post and ambulance variants) as of January 2025.
- Estimated 50 M1287 AMPV MC as of January 2025
- LRIP production to be concluded by December 2024

=== Potential operators ===
- Romania

Romania is looking for a successor to its Soviet-era infantry fighting vehicles. A bid for the supply of those vehicles has been opened for 298 vehicles (2 prototypes, 246 for the Phase I to be supplied by 2032, and Phase II, 50 to be supplied later), and with a local production. The confirmed participants include:

- K21 Redback (Hanwha)
- ASCOD 2 (GDELS SBS)
- KF41 Lynx (Rheinmetall)

BAE Systems requested to participate in the program, with the AMPV Infantry fighting vehicle and the CV90.

=== Failed bids ===
- Poland

BAE Systems is offering the AMPV vehicle to fulfil the need for a heavy IFV for the Polish Army. It would be equipped with the ZSSW-30 remote controlled turret. The Polish Army is looking for a heavy IFV (CBWP) for its Abrams tank brigades. The other vehicles in competition include the General Dynamics Ajax, the Rheinmetall KF-41 Lynx, the Otokar Tulpar and the AS21 Redback. Up to 700 vehicles are planned under the CBWP programme. Not selected to program.

== See also ==
- Interim Armored Vehicle, a U.S. Army combat vehicle program that resulted in the acquisition of the Stryker family
- Ground Combat Vehicle, a U.S. Army infantry fighting vehicle acquisition program canceled in 2014
- Joint Light Tactical Vehicle, a U.S. armed forces acquisition program to replace the Humvee
- Optionally Manned Fighting Vehicle, an ongoing U.S. Army infantry fighting vehicle program to replace the M2 Bradley
