= BCT Network =

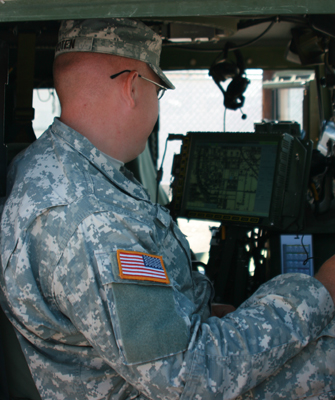
BCT Network

The BCT (Brigade Combat Team) network is a layered system of interconnected computers and software, radios, and sensors within the Brigade Combat Team (BCT) designed to increase survivability and strategy on a battlefield where units can communicate internally instead of through a central command. The BCT Network allows for a more efficient use of communication and a possibility to plug combined-arms warfare into the network for better communication.

== Deployment ==
The BCT network is essential to enable Unified Battle Command and will be delivered to the Army's Brigade Combat Teams in increasing capability increments. The first increment is currently finishing SDD developmental and operational testing and will be delivered to Infantry Brigade Combat Teams in the form of Network Integration Kits (B-kits) with E-IBCT. The first testing of the BCT network occurred in the Joint Multinational Readiness Center (JMRC), Germany, September 2020.

The soldier at every echelon, from Brigade to Squad, will be connected to the proper sensor data and communication relays to ensure proper battle-space situational awareness.

== The Network Integration Kit ==
The Network Integration Kit (NIK) is a suite of equipment capable of being installed on many vehicles including HMMWV's and MRAPs. It provides the Network connectivity and battle command software to integrate and fuse sensor data into the common operational picture (COP) displayed on the Force XXI Battle Command Battalion/Brigade and Below (FBCB2). The Network Integration Kit consists of an integrated computer system (ICS) that hosts the Battle Command software and the Systems of Systems Common Operating Environment (SOSCOE) software, along with the JTRS GMR radio to provide the interface to the sensors and unmanned systems, as well as voice and data communications with other vehicles and soldiers. Another benefit of this system allows vehicles with destroyed antennae to communicate through other vehicles' antennae.

Soldiers will be able to communicate with the Battalion Tactical Operation Center (TOC), by sending reports on enemy sighting, activity and location utilizing the NIK via the Network allowing for split-time tactical decisions instead of waiting for one commander to approve or deny decisions.

== Sources ==
This article incorporates work from https://web.archive.org/web/20090927002001/http://www.bctmod.army.mil/systems/network/index.html, which is in the public domain as it is a work of the United States Army.
