= M1296 Dragoon =

Infantry fighting vehicle

M1296 Infantry Carrier Vehicle Dragoon (ICVD)
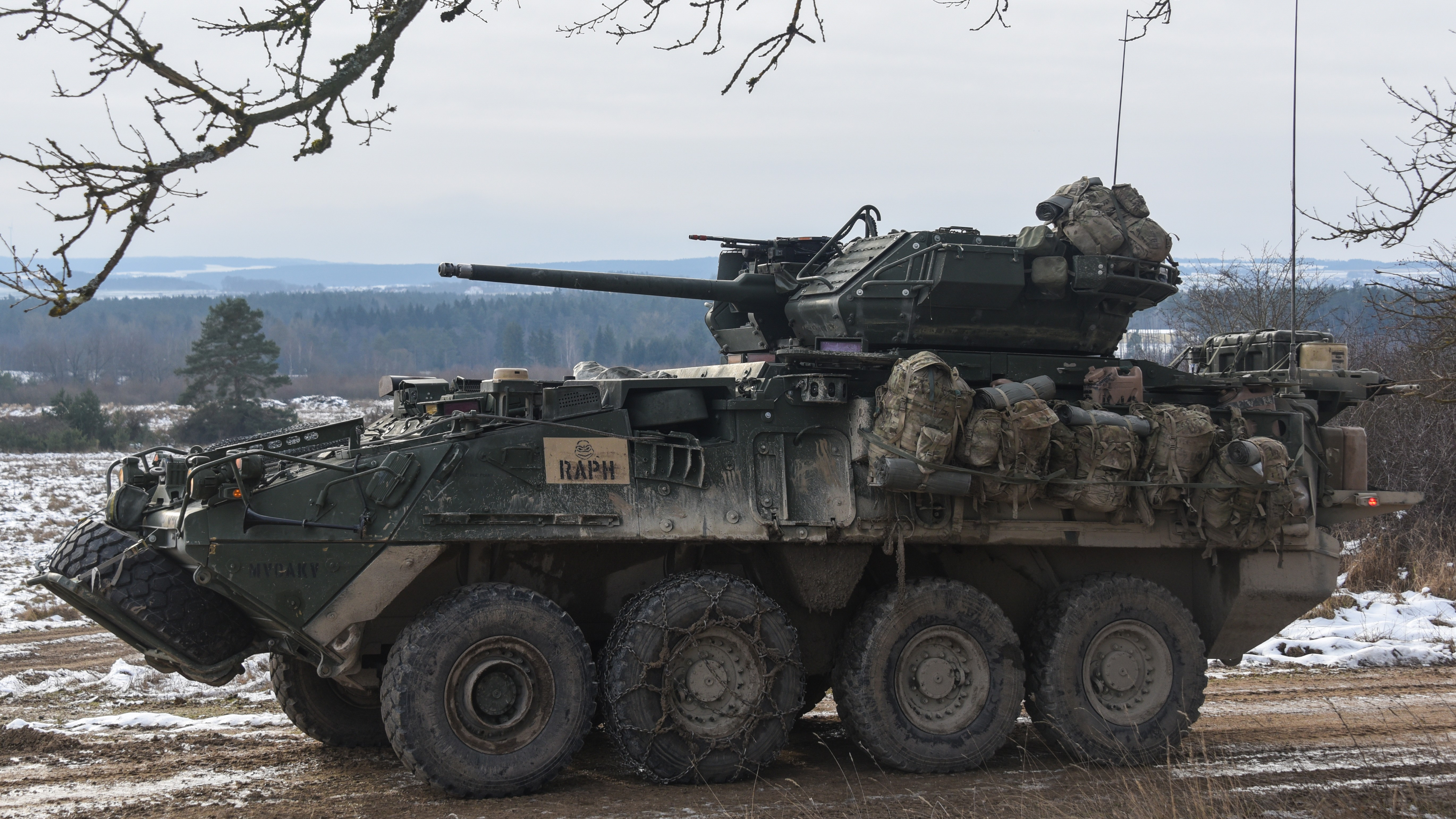
- Type: Infantry fighting vehicle
- Place of origin: United States

Service history
- In service: 2018–present
- Used by: United States Army (see Operators below for details)

Specifications
- Mass: 19.525 tonnes (21.52 short tons; 19.22 long tons)
- Length: 6.95 m (22 ft 10 in)
- Width: 2.72 m (8 ft 11 in)
- Height: 2.64 m (8 ft 8 in)(hull)
- Crew: 2 (commander and driver) + 9 dismounts
- Armor: With bolt-on ceramic armor: all-around 14.5×114mm protection
- Main armament: XM813 30 mm autocannon (156 ready rounds)
- Secondary armament: M240C 7.62 mm coaxial machine gun (400 ready rounds)
- Engine: Caterpillar C7 turbo diesel 350 hp (336 kW)
- Suspension: 8×8 wheeled
- Operational range: 500 km (310 mi)
- Maximum speed: 100 km/h (62 mph)

The M1296 Infantry Carrier Vehicle Dragoon (ICVD) is an upgraded variant of the Stryker infantry carrier vehicle (ICV), designed to enhance the firepower of U.S. Army Stryker brigade combat teams (SBCTs). The vehicle integrates a 30 mm XM813 Bushmaster II autocannon in a Kongsberg MCT-30 remote turret, significantly increasing its lethality over the standard Stryker Infantry Carrier Vehicle (ICV). First delivered in December 2017, the ICVD was developed in response to operational demands for a more heavily armed Stryker capable of countering evolving threats on the battlefield. It is operated by two crewman and can carry up to 9 dismounts.

== Development ==
The Stryker infantry carrier vehicle (ICV) was initially equipped with lighter armament, but efforts were made to enhance its firepower by integrating a remote turret with a 30 mm autocannon onto the Stryker ICV. This upgrade aimed to compensate for the reduced number of Mobile Gun System (MGS) vehicles per brigade by increasing the lethality of individual ICVs without compromising dismount capacity, as the remote turret does not occupy space within the hull. The U.S. Army began testing stabilized 30 mm cannons in early 2014, including Kongsberg Protech Systems' Medium Caliber Remote Weapons Station (MCRWS). In 2015, the Army approved the upgrade of 81 Strykers in the 2nd Cavalry Regiment with this system, incorporating the Orbital ATK XM813 variant of the Mk44 Bushmaster II. The first upgraded Stryker, designated XM1296 Dragoon, was delivered for testing in October 2016. After its adoption, the vehicle was redesignated M1296 ICVD, and the first vehicles were delivered to the 2nd Cavalry Regiment in Germany in December 2017.

== Design ==
M1296 firing Mk 310 PABM-T rounds

=== Firepower ===
Modifications were made to the hull roof of the Stryker in order to install a Kongsberg unmanned turret with an XM813 30 mm cannon, which can engage targets out to 3,000 meters (1.9 mi), with a rate of fire of 100-200 rounds per minute (RPM). This added around two tons of weight to the vehicle. The XM813 30 mm autocannon fires two types of service rounds, the Mk 238 high-explosive incendiary – tracer (HEI-T) and the Mk 258 armor piercing fin-stabilized discarding sabot – tracer (APFSDS-T). The autocannon is fed by two magazines holding armor piercing and high explosive ammunition. Each magazine carries 78 rounds, with more rounds stored in the hull. Additionally, the XM813 can fire the Mk 310 programmable air burst munition with tracer (PABM-T), a programmable high-explosive round that can be set by the fire control system to detonate at a specific range. The Mk 310 features three selectable modes: point detonate, point detonation delay, and air burst. This capability allows the M1296 to engage troops in trenches or defilade positions and destroy trucks, drones, and helicopters. This armament provides greater range and lethality compared to the ICV's M2 .50 caliber machine gun or Mk-19 grenade launcher. The M1296 is also equipped with a 7.62 mm M240C coaxial machine gun, which has a cyclic rate of fire of 650–950 rounds per minute and has 400 rounds ready to fire in the turret.

=== Armor and protection ===
The Stryker ICVD's survivability is comparable to the legacy Stryker flat-bottom hull ICV equipped with the same protection kits. The hull armor is constructed from a high-hardness steel, which offers a basic level of protection against 14.5mm rounds on the frontal arc and all-around protection against 7.62mm ball ammunition. There is also appliqué armor, which is bolt-on ceramic armor that offers all-around protection against 14.5mm armor-piercing ammunition and artillery fragments from 152mm high-explosive rounds.

=== Situational awareness ===
The M1296 Infantry Carrier Vehicle Dragoon (ICVD) is equipped advanced camera systems to enhance the crew's visibility in various conditions. The driver's vision enhancer - wide (DVE-Wide) is a compact thermal camera that provides a 107-degree horizontal field of view. These DVE-Wide cameras are mounted around the hull, collectively enabling a full 360-degree view for the crew, significantly improving situational awareness. This system features image stabilization to counteract shock and vibration, while its ruggedized display ensures reliability in demanding tactical environments.

The vehicle's commander has a Force XXI Battle Command Brigade and Below (FBCB2) digital communications system that allows communication between vehicles through text messaging and a map network, as well as with the battalion. The map shows the position of all vehicles on the battlefield and the commander can mark the position of enemy forces on the map, which can then be seen by other commanders.

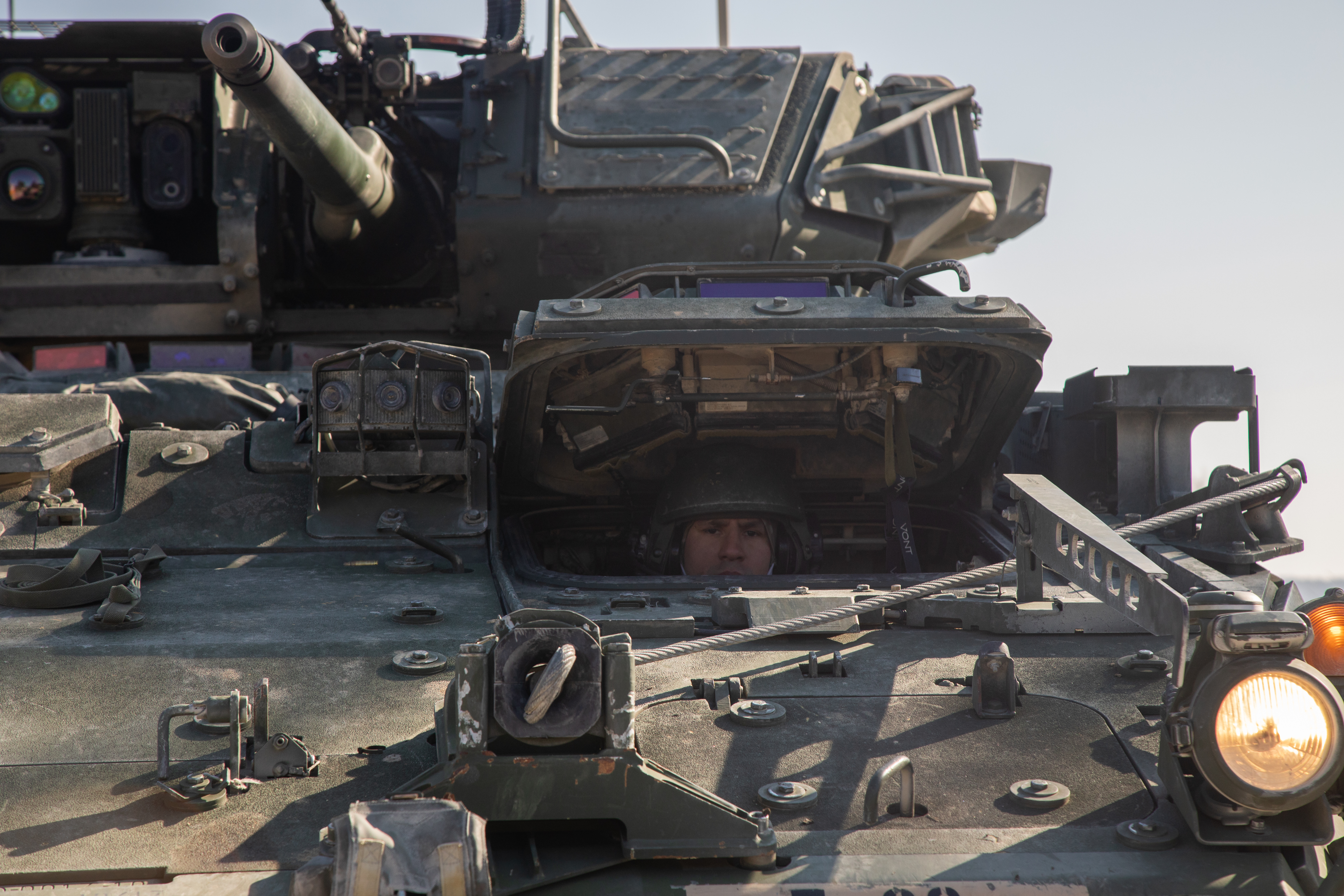
Close-up of the front facing DVE-Wide cameras

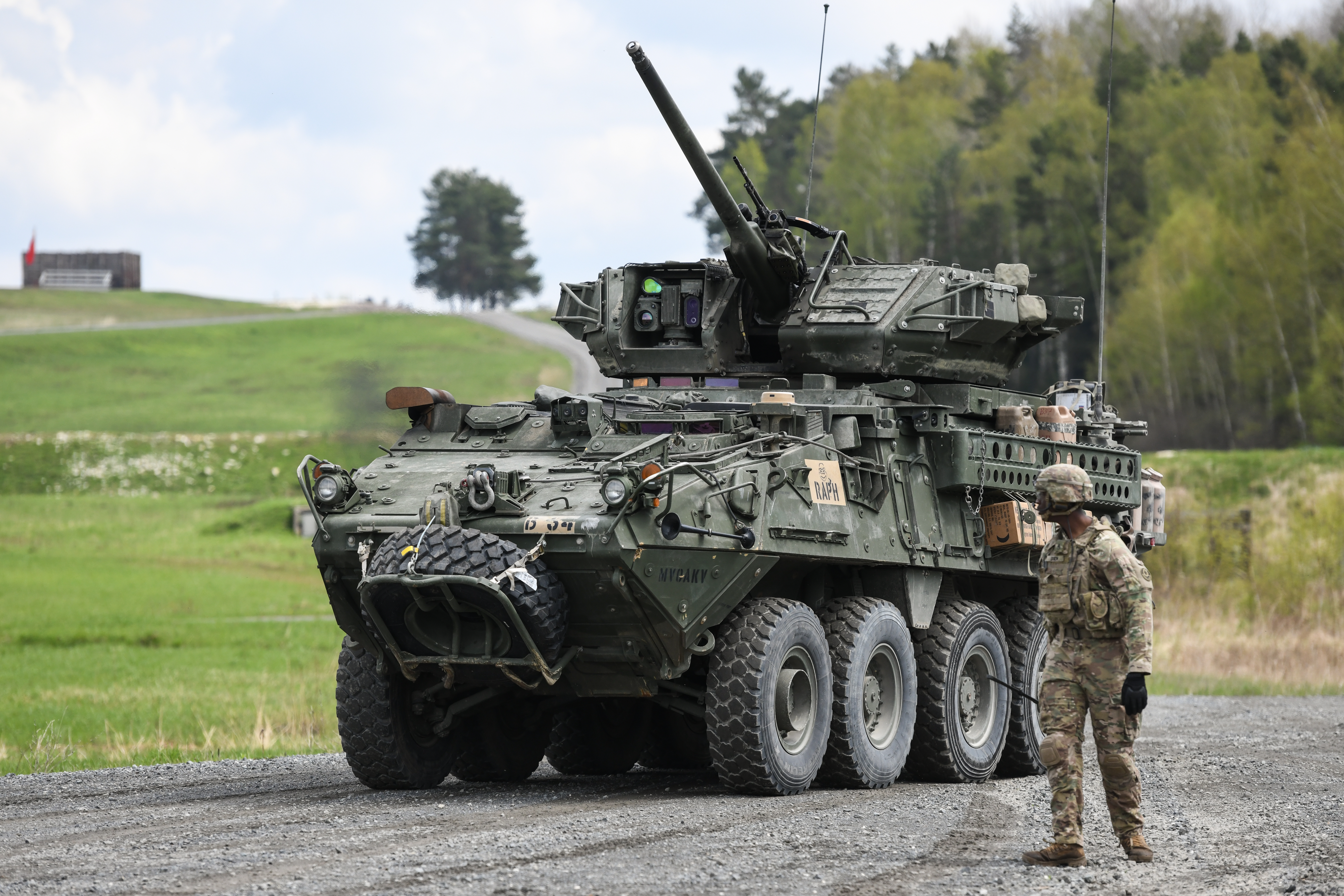
M1296 equipped with DVE-Wide cameras on the front and sides

M1296 dismounting troops and firing its XM813

== Operational history ==
The M1296 ICVD was first fielded by the U.S. Army's 2nd Cavalry Regiment in Europe in 2018. It comprises 50 percent of the regiment's rifle and scout platoon vehicles, totaling 81 in service. Its deployment aimed to enhance the regiment's combat capabilities in response to evolving threats in the region.

The M1296 Dragoon is set to be replaced by the M1304 ICVVA1-30mm. The U.S. Army plans to field 269 M1304s across three Stryker brigade combat teams (SBCTs). The first M1304s were delivered on January 15, 2025, to the 1st Battalion, 17th Infantry Regiment, also known as the "Buffaloes".

== Operators ==
- United States: U.S. Army 2nd Cavalry Regiment, 83 as of January 2025

=== Future operators ===
- Bulgaria: Bulgaria ordered 90 M1296 ICVDs
