= Low rate initial production =

Phase of weapons design process

Low rate initial production (LRIP) is a term commonly used in military weapons projects and programs to designate the phase of initial, small-quantity production. The term is also applied in fields other than weapons production, most commonly in non-weapon military equipment programs.

With LRIP, the prospective first buyer and operator (i.e., a country's defense authorities and the relevant military units) can thoroughly test the weapons system over some protracted amount of time in order to gain a reasonable degree of confidence as to whether the system actually performs to the agreed-upon requirements before contracts for mass production are signed. At the same time, manufacturers can use the LRIP as a production test phase in which they develop the assembly line models that would eventually be used in mass production. Therefore, the LRIP is commonly the first step in transitioning from highly customized, hand-built prototypes to the final mass-produced end product.

In practice, either the production capability or the weapons system itself can be unready during the LRIP phase. This can mean that systems produced during LRIP are built significantly differently both in terms of technique and cost owing to the immaturity of the production line or changes in the weapons system's design, necessitating a large degree of hand assembly and trial and error typically associated with the prototyping stage. Furthermore, the cost of each LRIP system can be much greater than the final mass production unit cost, since the LRIP cost can include both the R&D and setup cost for production, although the goal is for this additional cost to be spread out over future production carried out by the assembly capacity developed during LRIP.

Immaturity in a system's design or its method of production discovered during LRIP phase can result in additional LRIP phases to verify corrections and improvements, or project cancellation. The Congressional Budget Office has found that the United States Department of Defense rarely achieves projected cost savings because too many programs fail to move from LRIP to full-scale production. The Japanese Ministry of Defense similarly lists R&D and initial production as "high-risk phases" in a 2008 report.
