= High Survivability Test Vehicle (Lightweight) =

US Army light tank

High Survivability Test Vehicle (Light)
- HSTV-L at Fort Benning
- Type: Light tank
- Place of origin: United States

Production history
- Designer: AAI Corporation / Pacific Car and Foundry
- Designed: 1977
- Manufacturer: AAI Corporation
- No. built: 1 Testbed built

Specifications
- Mass: 20.45 t (with instrumentation and partial applique armor)
- Length: Hull: 5.981 m, Gun Forward: 8.528m
- Width: 2.794 m
- Height: Overall: 2.414 m, To Turret Top: 1.994 m, To Hull Top: 1.422 m
- Crew: 3 (Commander, Gunner, Driver)
- Main armament: 75 mm XM274 CTA autocannon
- Secondary armament: coaxial 7.62 mm M240 machine gun
- Engine: Lycoming 650 gas turbine 650hp
- Power/weight: 31.78 hp/tonne
- Transmission: GMC Detroit Diesel Allison cross drive, single-stage automatic with 4 forward and 1 reverse
- Suspension: hydro-pneumatic
- Ground clearance: 0.508 m
- Fuel capacity: 409 litres
- Operational range: 160 km
- Maximum speed: 83 km/h (51.6 mph)

The High Survivability Test Vehicle (Lightweight) (HSTV(L)) was a U.S. Army light tank manufactured by AAI Corporation. It was developed under the Tank-automotive and Armaments Command (TACOM) Armored Combat Vehicle Technology (ACVT) program.

== History ==
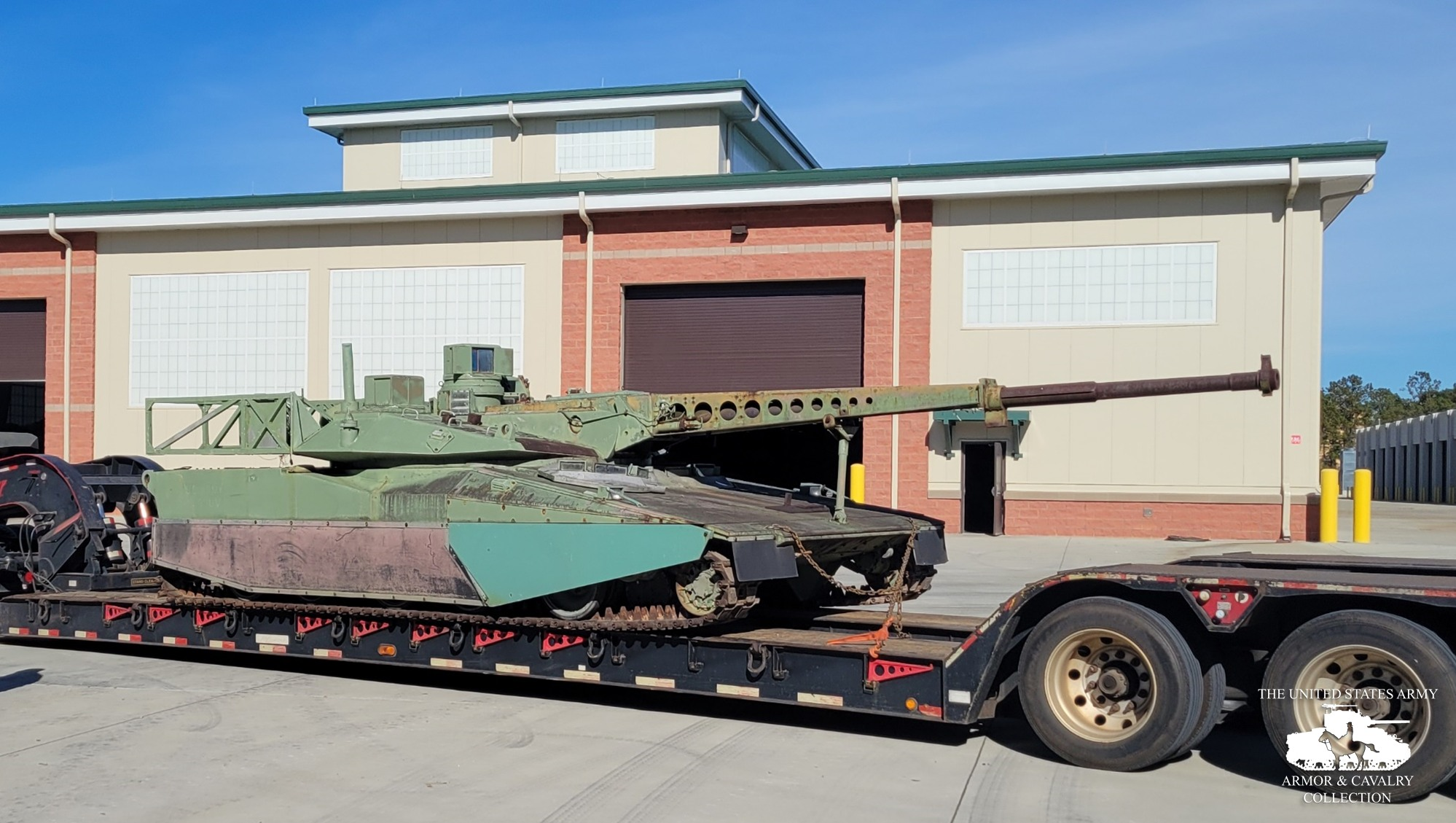
The AAI High Survivability Test Vehicle (Lightweight) arrives at the U.S. Army Armor & Cavalry Collection at Fort Benning in 2021

In early 1977 the Army selected proposals from AAI and Pacific Car and Foundry for HSTV(L) concept feasibility analysis.

In December 1977, the Army awarded the HSTV(L) fabrication contract to AAI.

One reported early challenge was meeting the HSTV(L)'s weight target. As of September 1981, no significant problems were reported with the HSTV(L).

Martin Marietta expressed interest in a joint venture with the AAI Corporation to enter a version of the HSTV-L into the U.S. Army's Armored Gun System competition. The corporation apparently decided that the technology was not sufficiently advanced to proceed with radical changes in the HSTV-L to meet the new AGS requirements, therefore, they did not bid on the program.

== Design ==
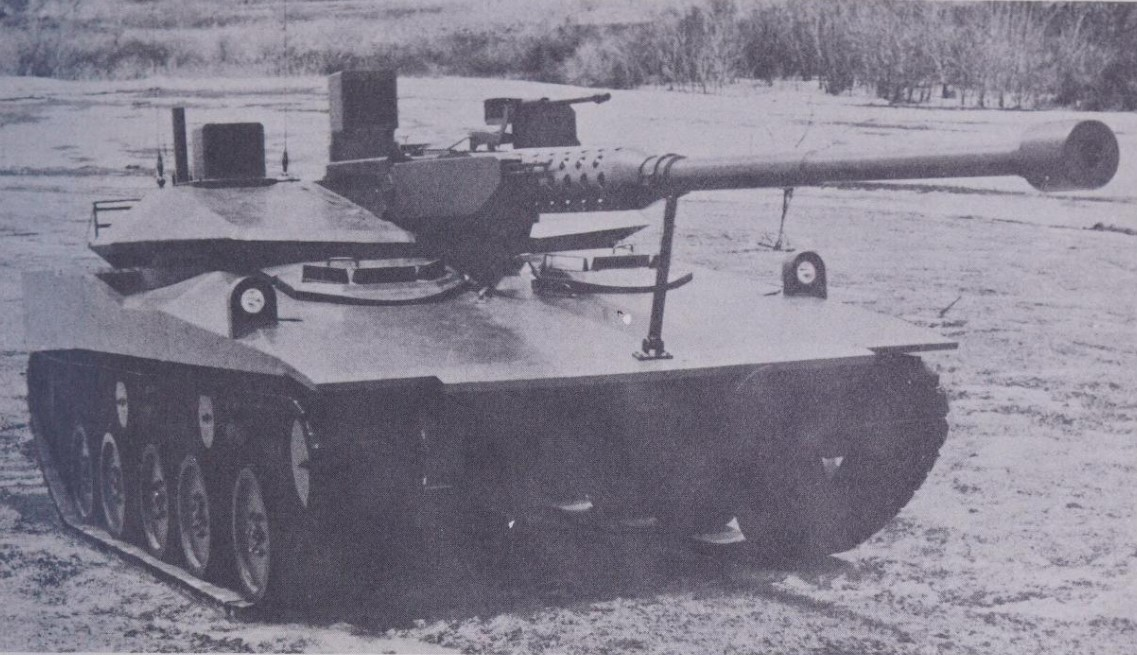
AAI HSTV(L) mockup c. 1979

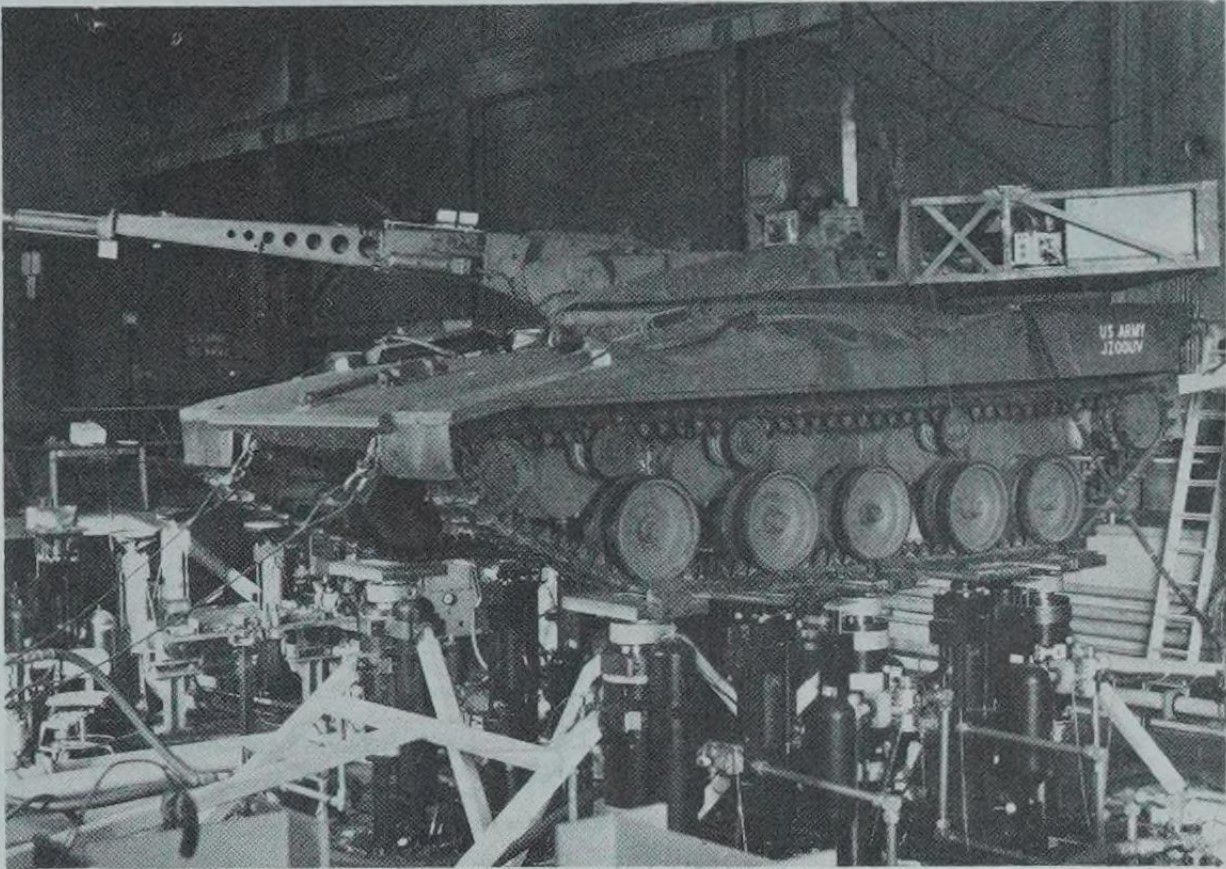
AAI HSTV(L) c. 1983

=== Mobility ===
The AAI HSTV(L) is powered by a Avco Lycoming 650hp gas turbine (derived from the LTS101). It is connected to an automatic 4-speed X-300 transmission made by Detroit Diesel Allison, the turbine being placed behind the transmission. It used a fixed height hydro-pneumatic suspension system and tracks modified from those used on the M551 Sheridan.

The Pacific Car and Foundry HSTV(L) is powered by a General Motors 8V71T diesel engine connected to a General Electric HMPT-500 transmission.

=== Armament ===
The main armament consisted of an Ares Incorporated XM274 75 mm CTA autocannon with 2-axis stabilization capable of firing Armour-piercing fin-stabilized discarding sabot and high-explosive. Secondary armament consisted of a coaxial 7.62 mm M240 machine gun and a commander's M240. AAI had originally planned to place a .50 caliber (12.7 mm) heavy machine gun at the commander's hatch.

Pacific Car's proposal mounted the Ares 75 mm gun in an external elevating trunnion mount alongside a coaxial 25 mm M242 Bushmaster autocannon. Twenty-two 75 mm ready rounds (11 APFSDS and 11 HE respectively) could be carried in a magazine and thirty-three more could be stored in the hull. A 40 mm grenade launcher was originally included, but removed during a review of the proposal.

The AAI proposal called for sixty 75 mm rounds. As built, the test vehicle had only 26 rounds, but provisions existed for the original 60 rounds in the turret. The projectiles were stored vertically in a magazine beneath the right side of the turret and fed vertically into the rotating breech, with the shell casing being ejected vertically upwards. Unlike the Pacific Car and Foundry proposal all rounds were accessible to the autoloader and there was no secondary ammunition storage.

=== Armor ===
The armor thickness and layout are unknown; however it most likely used an aluminum alloy similar to the M2 Bradley and M113.

=== Crew ===
The AAI HSTV(L) had an unconventional crew layout, with the commander located in the turret, and the driver and gunner being located in the hull. The commander had access to a 2-axis stabilized hunter sight produced by Texas Instruments that was independent of the turret and allowed him to freely locate targets, and then slave the turret to his sight. The gunner would then engage the target while the commander looked for the next target. Both the gunner's sight and commander's hunter-killer sight were 2-axis stabilized, had both direct vision and FLIR optics, and with the gunner's sight having access to a CO_{2} eye safe laser rangefinder made by Raytheon. Any crewmember could use the armament as both the hunter-killer sight and gunner's primary sight were available through a TV screen mounted at each crew station. Only the gunner and driver could drive. There was also a fixed rear view TV camera to help with reversing.

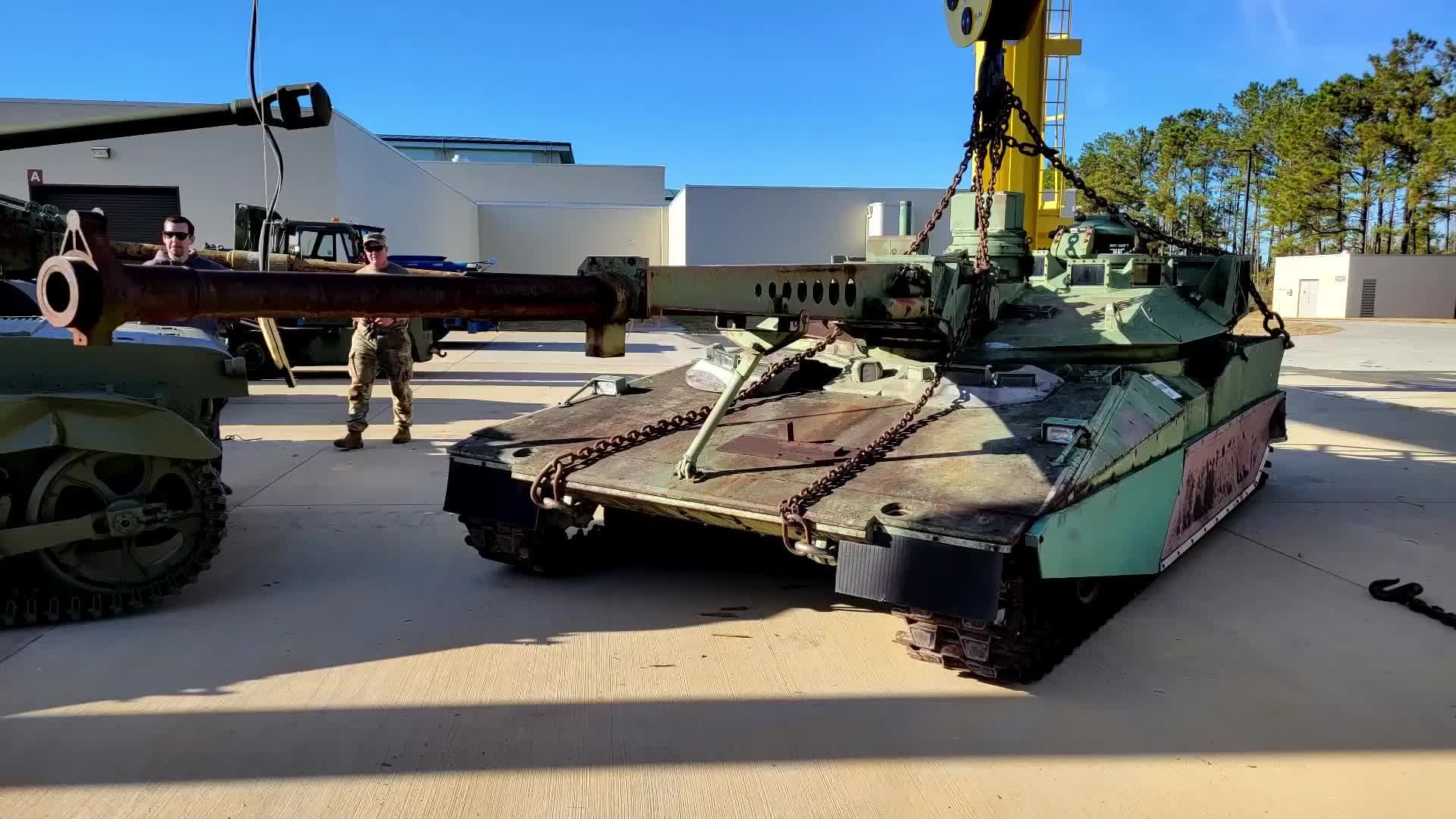
HSTV(L) at the U.S. Army Armor and Cavalry Collection, Fort Benning, Georgia, in 2021

For the Pacific Car HSTV(L), the crew layout was more conventional, having the commander and gunner located in the turret in the turret basket below the external gun system.

== See also ==
- M551 Sheridan
  - M551 Sheridan replacement process
- M8 Armored Gun System

== Sources ==
- Hunnicutt, Richard Pearce (2015) [1995]. Sheridan: A History of the American Light Tank. Vol. 2. Brattleboro, VT: Echo Point Books & Media. ISBN 978-1-62654-154-2.
