= M68 tank gun =

M68
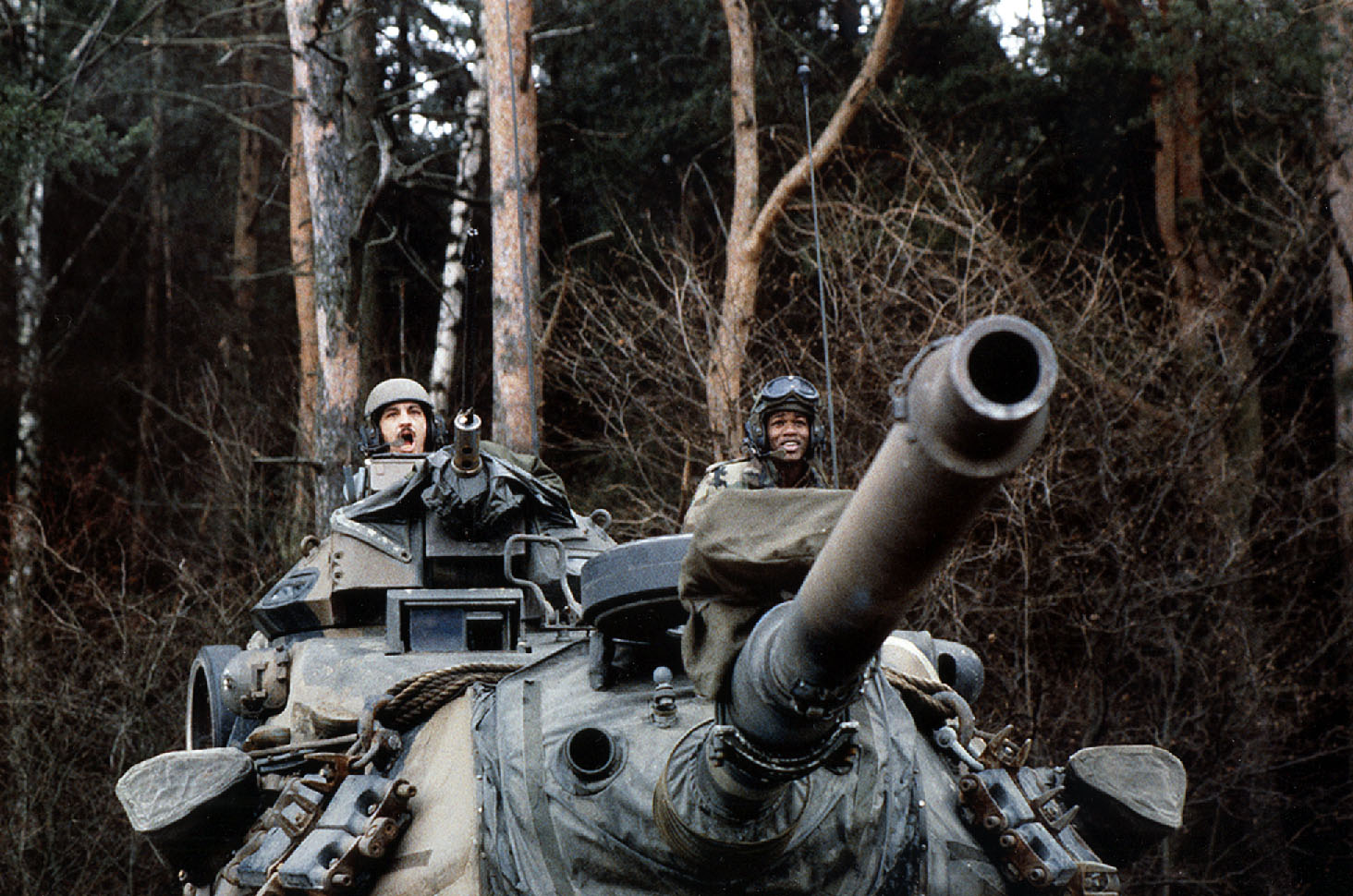
- Front view of a M68E1 gun on an American M60A3 main battle tank during a military exercise in Nuremberg, 1986.
- Type: Tank gun
- Place of origin: United States; United Kingdom

Service history
- In service: 1960–present

Production history
- Designer: Watervliet Arsenal
- Manufacturer: Watervliet Arsenal
- Produced: 1959–present
- Variants: M68E1, M68A1, M68A1E4

Specifications
- Mass: 754 kg (1,662 lb) (gun tube); 1,128 kg (2,487 lb) (recoiling gun mass)
- Length: 5,550 mm (218.50 in) (overall)
- Barrel length: 5,347 mm (210.51 in) (gun tube)
- Shell: 105×617mm. R
- Calibre: 105 mm (4.134 in)
- Breech: semi-automatic vertical sliding-breechblock
- Recoil: 305 mm

The M68 is an American rifled 105 mm tank gun. It uses a British-designed L7 gun tube and cartridges with an American-designed mount, breech assembly and recoil mechanism.

== Technical characteristics ==
The M68 differs from the L7 in several aspects :

- The M68 uses a concentric recoil spring instead of a separate buffer and recuperator hydraulic cylinders.
- The M68 has a cylindrical breech with a vertical sliding breech block instead of a square-shaped breech with a horizontal sliding breech block.
- Firing is electrical only.
- The M68 barrel is secured to the breech by a tapered pin and interrupted breech threads which allow the barrel to be removed from the gun shield without having to dismantle the mantlet.
- The M68 is fitted with an eccentric bore evacuator instead of a concentric model in order to provide more clearance over the rear deck.
- The M68 chamber has a difference in the length of its shoulder, producing a different diametral taper near the freebore.

== History ==
The main gun for the M60 tank series was chosen after a comparative firing test of six different guns carried out on the Aberdeen Proving Ground in 1958. The factors evaluated were accuracy, the lethality of a hit, rate of fire, and penetration performance. Based on these tests, the 105 mm T254E1 was selected, modified to the T254E2 and standardized as the Cannon, 105-MM Gun, M68. The T254E2/M68 used a vertical sliding breechblock instead of the T254E1's horizontal breechblock. Until American-made barrels could be obtained with comparable accuracy, British X15/L52 barrels mounting a concentric bore evacuator on the barrel were to be used. US-built XM24/L52 barrels (length 218.5 inches) fitted with an eccentric bore evacuator were used for the M60-series starting in June 1959 but retained interchangeability with the British X15/L52 barrel. All of the US guns and XM24 barrels were produced at the Watervliet Arsenal in New York and the gun mounts (M116 for the M60 and M140 for the M60A1/A3) manufactured at the Rock Island Arsenal in Illinois. US M68 guns were fitted with an eccentric bore evacuator instead of a concentric model in order to provide more clearance over the rear deck of the tank. The original variant of the M60 tank was equipped with the M68 gun using the M116 mount. Additionally, many M48A3s armed with a 90mm gun that were in NG-CONUS service with the Army National Guard were retrofitted with the M68 gun and re-designated as the M48A5. This was done to maintain training levels of Guard units as well as using a commonality in ammunition amongst tanks.

The M60A1 and A3 variants of the M60 series and earliest pre-production XM1 prototypes of the M1 Abrams tanks are armed with the M68E1 variant of the gun. The M68E1 gun shares the same firing characteristics as the M68. It featured several design improvements including an updated gun hydraulic configuration, a stabilization upgrade for the gun, a gun elevation kill switch for the loader, improved ballistic drive and other component refinements. They were fitted with thermal sleeves on the barrels starting in 1973. During the mid 1970s it was becoming clear that the latest generation of composite based armor was impervious to tungsten carbide penetrators. Work was performed at the Department of Energy's Pacific Northwest National Laboratory to engineer development of depleted uranium as a penetrator material for future ammunition while the Armament Research and Development Command (ARRADCOM) was improving the performance of the 105mm M774 cartridge. The improved M833 round starting in 1983, also using a depleted uranium penetrator to keep the M68E1 gun viable against this improved armor. In 1975 an updated version of the gun, the T254E3 was designed, focusing on the use of chrome plating to improve accuracy. It was used to evaluate improvements to the gun's performance using discarding sabot ammunition. Two guns were built and underwent firing trials at Aberdeen and technical evaluations at the Watervliet Arsenal. Based on the results of these tests the shortcomings of plated bores and gun tubes were found to outweigh any advantage they might offer and the program dropped by May 1976.

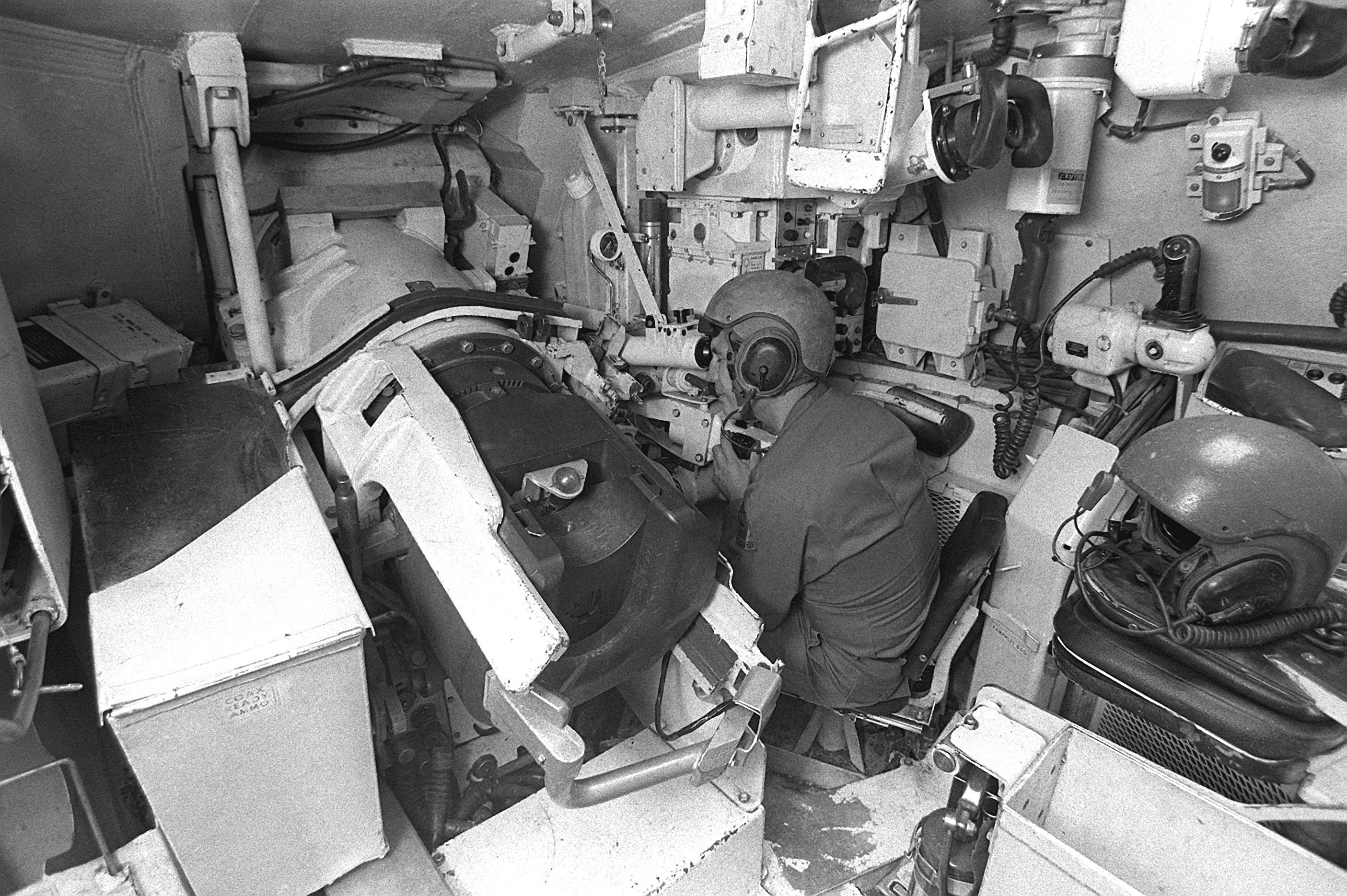
The interior of an XM1 Abrams, showing the breech end of the gun.

In January 1978, a program was initiated to develop an enhanced version of the 105mm gun, the M68A1 as a possible alternate weapon for the M1 Abrams. had a higher chamber pressure, reinforced breech allowing the use of high-energy propellants. Although the M256 120mm smoothbore gun was chosen to be the main weapon of the M1 Abrams in 1979, the ammunition for the gun was still not fully developed, thus delaying its fielding until 1984. The early production versions of the M1 Abrams (M1 & IPM1) were armed with the M68A1 for two reasons. First was due to the large number of M60 Patton tanks with the M68E1 gun still in widespread US service in the 1980s and a large on-hand stockpile of 105mm munitions. Fitting the M1 with the M68A1 gun was viewed as an economical and practical solution that allowed for commonality in ammunition among the two types of tanks. Secondly was that the M68A1E2 could employ the newly developed M900A1 APFSDS depleted uranium round that had improved penetration performance in comparison to the M833. These early versions of the M1 Abrams were in active Army service until 1991 and with National Guard units until 1996. M1s built after 1984 were armed with the 120mm M256 and designated the M1A1. Many earlier M1 and IPM1 tanks were refitted with the M256 and their designations changed to the M1A1.

The M1128 Stryker mobile gun system (MGS) carries the M68A1E4 105 mm cannon. The principal function of the MGS is to provide rapid direct fire to support assaulting infantry. The cannon is mounted in a low-profile, fully stabilized turret integrated into the Stryker chassis. The M68A1E4 is based on the M68A1E2 105mm cannon's design. It has a sustained fire rate of six rounds per minute. The gun employs four types of cartridges. The M900A1 kinetic energy penetrator to destroy armored vehicles; the M456A2 high explosive anti-tank round to destroy thin-skinned vehicles and provide anti-personnel fragmentation; the M393A3 high explosive plastic round to destroy bunkers, machine gun and sniper positions, and breach openings in walls for infantry to access; and M1040 canister shot for use against dismounted infantry in the open.

== Models ==
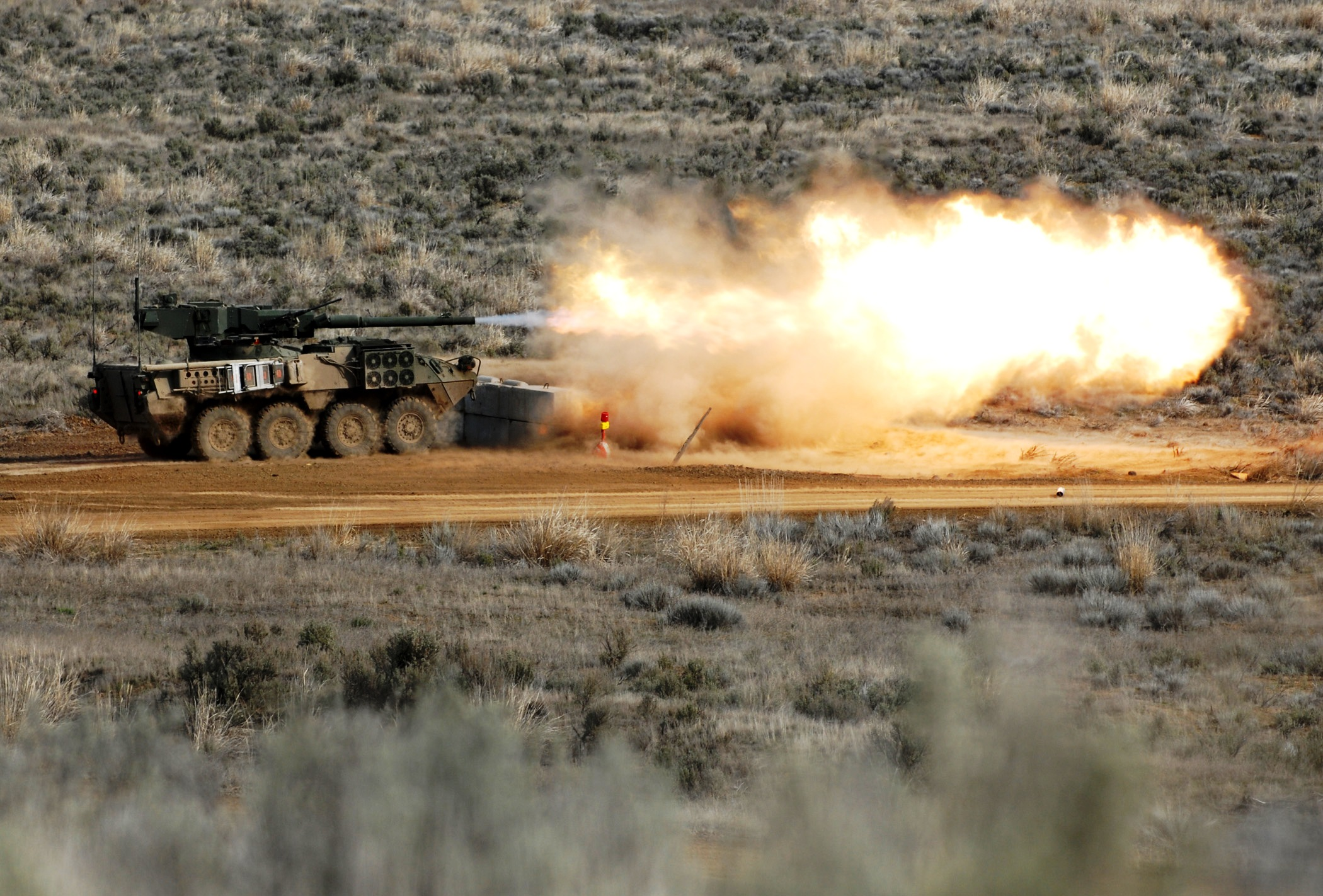
A U.S. Army M1128 mobile gun system fires its M68A2 tank gun in 2011

- M68 : initial production variant, used on the original variant of the M60 tank and the M116 gun mount. Retrofitted to the M48A5.
- M68E1 : variant used on the M60A1 and M60A3 tanks in mount M140. They were fitted with a fiberglass thermal shroud in 1973.
- M68A1 : improved variant built in 1980 for use on the M1 and IPM1 versions of the M1 Abrams. The M68A1 features an aluminum thermal shroud and a pad for fixing the muzzle reference sensor.
- M68A1E4 : a lightweight, low-recoil version of the M68A1 designed for the M1128 mobile gun system (Stryker MGS). Also designated as M68A2, it features an Ares Incorporated long stroke, low recoil impulse mechanism and a muzzle brake (later removed). The breech is mounted upside down to accommodate the automatic loader.

=== Foreign variants ===
- KM68A1 : license-produced variant of the US M68A1 gun for the South Korean Army. Used on the South Korean variant of the M48, the M48A5K and K1 tanks.
- M68T : Turkish license-built versions by MKEK under the designation of M68T to up-gun its 90 mm armed M48 fleet, took place in the 1980s.
- M64 L71A : Israeli variant built by IMI for the Merkava Mk. I and Mk. 2 tanks.

=== Prototypes ===
- T254E1 : US designation for the L7A1, it had the same horizontal sliding breech block as the L7 and used British X15/L52 barrels with a concentric bore evacuator on the barrel.
- T254E2 : US variant of the T254, it had a vertical drop breech block with the X15E8 barrel and a concentric bore evacuator. Later standardized as M68. Used in M60 prototype vehicles.
- T254E3 : US variant designed in 1975, identical to thee T254E2/M68 but with chrome-plated bores. Only two built.
- XM24 : the XM24 gun tube was extended by 1.5 m (4 ft 11 in) compared to the M68A1 and it could tolerate a higher chamber pressure. Designed to replace the 105mm gun M68A1 in the M1 and the IPM1, it was expected to have improved penetration performance, particularly with the upcoming XM900 APFSDS (later canceled and superseded by the M900A1). At that time, it was expected that the installation of the enhanced 105 mm gun would be less costly than retrofitting the M1 and IPM1 with the 120 mm gun M256. The program was initiated in March 1983, the Watervliet Arsenal manufactured 14 XM24 tubes and 17 breeches for cannon during the fiscal year 1984. The US Army completed the advanced development phase in February 1984 and initiated it for the M1 in March. Full-scale development was expected to begin in November 1984 for the M60A3 and in January 1985 for the Abrams but the program was abandoned.

== Usage ==
- M1 Abrams: M68A1 cannon used early production models (M1 and IPM1)
- M47 Patton: in some upgraded variants
  - M47M: Iranian modification of US-supplied M47Ms
  - Sabalan: Iranian modification
  - Tiam: Iranian modification
- M48 Patton: in some upgraded variants
  - M48A5: US model
  - Magach 3: Israeli modification
  - CM11 Brave Tiger: Taiwanese modification
  - CM12 tank: Taiwanese modification
  - M48A5K1: South Korean modification
  - M48A5T1: Turkish modification
- M60 tank: M60 and M60A1 using M68, M60A3 using M68E1
- M1128 mobile gun system: M68A1E4 cannon
- Expeditionary Tank
- K1 Type 88: KM68A1 cannon
- Merkava: Mark I and Mark II models
- T-54/55: in some upgraded variants
  - Tiran-4Sh: Israeli modification of T-54, both L7 and M68 variants fitted
  - Tiran-5Sh: Israeli modification of T-55, both L7 and M68 variants fitted
  - Type 72Z: Iranian modernization of T-54/55 and Type 59
  - Ramses II: Egyptian modernization of T-55

== See also ==
- CN105 F1 (French counterpart)
- D-10T (Soviet counterpart)
- U-5TS (Soviet 115 mm counterpart)
- M35 tank gun, an American lighter variant of the M68 with a shorter recoil
