= XM274 =

75mm cased telescopic ammunition autocannon

The Ares Incorporated XM274 (originally designated as the medium caliber, antiarmor automatic cannon, MC-AAAC) was an American smoothbore 75mm autocannon designed by Eugene Stoner. It used a rotating breech block with cased telescopic ammunition. It was developed for the HIMAG program, but was later used on a variety of test vehicles.

== History ==
In 1975 DARPA proposed for a high performance test bed vehicle to be made, to evaluate, among other things, a high velocity, high fire rate medium caliber autocannon. The vehicle would begin to be built in 1976 and designated the High Mobility Agility (HIMAG) vehicle. A 75mm smoothbore CTA autocannon would be made for the vehicle, originally designated as the medium caliber, antiarmor automatic cannon (MC-AAAC), later designated XM274.

The gun was to be developed under a DARPA contract by Ares Incorporated. The original contract specified a 60mm, but it was later changed to be 75mm. The original design for the gun used a sliding breech, however after a failure to meet the required dispersion during testing in January 1979, the gun was instead switched to use a rotating breech. The complete HIMAG system, and thus the MC-AAAC, were sent to the Aberdeen Proving Ground in 1980, for evaluation by the US army. The HIMAG was then shipped to Fort Knox where it completed tests in 1981, and was then later used for testing in other programs. The MC-AAAC was found to have similar dispersion to a large caliber tank gun (105/120mm), and 2 round bursts were found to be the most effective method of shooting on the move.

In 1976, the HIMAG project was moved from being a DARPA contract to being under the newly formed Armoured Combat Vehicle Technology (ACVT) program, jointly run by DARPA, TACOM and the USMC. Under this new program, another vehicle using the MC-AAAC was developed, the High Survivability Test Vehicle - Lightweight (HSTVL). The HSTVL had its origins in early proposals for the HIMAG. From February to July 1977 both AAI Corporation and Pacific Car and Foundry Company each designed and developed a proposal for the HSTVL project. They were both armed with the MC-AAAC, with the AAI Corporation proposal mounting it in a conventional turret with a 60-round magazine and the Pacific Car and Foundry Company proposal mounting the gun in an external elevating trunnion with 22 rounds ready.

After evaluation of both proposals in late 1977, the contract was awarded to AAI Corporation, who then built the vehicle, and was then used in testing. While Pacific Car and Foundry Company lost the contract for the HSTVL, they went on to develop the elevating trunnion gun mount further. Pacific Car and Foundry Company received a contract to build the Elevated Kinetic Energy (ELKE) vehicle which was completed and sent off for testing in 1982. It mounted the MC-AAAC in an external elevating trunnion mount with a very wide range of elevation and depression angles, with the turret mounted on the hull of an M551.

Also under the ACVT program, 25 different vehicle design concepts were produced, including scout vehicles, IFV's and light tanks. Most of these were to be equipped with the MC-AAAC, however a few were to be equipped with a scaled up 90mm version of the MC-AAAC, of which little information is known about, only that it was built and tested but never used in a vehicle. None of these design concepts were ever built.

In 1980, AAI Corporation further developed the HSTVL concept into the Rapid Deployment Force Light Tank (RDF/LT) prototype. This was, like the HSTVL, to be armed with the MC-AAAC which had now officially been designated as the XM274. As the RDF/LT was intended to have a secondary anti air role, a 75mm proximity fused HE round was made for the gun. As the XM274 was not permitted for export, another version of the RDF/LT was proposed armed with the M32 76mm rifled cannon used on the M41 for which a new APFSDS round was developed. A towed variant of the gun was also proposed, to be carried on a M31 gun carriage used by the M102 105mm howitzer, with a video system mounted on the gun so that it could be remotely aimed and fired with the gun feeding from a 6-round magazine.

By the early 1980s, it was becoming apparent to the US army that the 75mm would no longer be suitable for use against more modern armor and so all new proposals for light vehicles intended to fight tanks were to instead use a larger caliber gun such as the 105mm M68, which would then lead to the AGS program. No further vehicles were produced with the XM274, though any test vehicles using the gun may have still be in use at this time.

== Design ==
The main component of the gun is the rotating breech block. This worked by allowing the breech block to rotate to the vertical so that a round could be loaded from an autoloader, then the breech block would rotate back to the firing position to be horizontal with the barrel. When the gun was fired, the casing would then expand to seal the gap between the casing and the barrel. After firing the breech block would then rotate again to the vertical, the spent case would then be ejected from the top of the breech block by the next round being rammed up into it. A self contained hydro-pneumatic recoil system was used.

The maximum rate of fire was two rounds a second, however the FCS and stabilization was not able to keep up with this and so operationally the rate of fire was set to one round a second. For all applications an autoloader was used with the XM274, however the type of autoloader varied depending on which vehicle it was mounted in, in the HIMAG it used a 6-round vertical carousel and in the HSTVL a 60-round vertical magazine was used. The gun was also designed to be lightweight, using a composite gun sleeve which also had holes cut into it to reduce weight, the recoil mechanism was also incorporated into the breech reducing its weight further.

== Ammunition ==
All the types of ammunition used were cased telescopic. The projectile was embedded in the solid propellant (liquid propellant was originally intended, but later moved to a separate project), shortening the length of the round and allowing a rotating breech block to be used and increasing the rate of fire. All types of ammunition were 406mm in length and 132mm in diameter, with each weighing 15.6 kg.

- XM884 HE that could use a standard fuse or a proximity fuse for use against aircraft.
- XM885 APFSDS-T - there are two known variants, both of which had depleted uranium penetrators. Delta-3, which used a 2.27 kg penetrator with equivalent performance to 105mm M774. Delta-6, which has an unknown penetrator mass with 430mm of penetration into a 450mm steel target.
- XM886 Target Practice TPFSDS-T
- XM887 Target Practice TP-T

== Usage ==
- HIMAG
- HSTVL
- RDFLT
- ELKE
- ACVT Program
