= M1128 mobile gun system =

American eight-wheeled assault gun Stryker variant

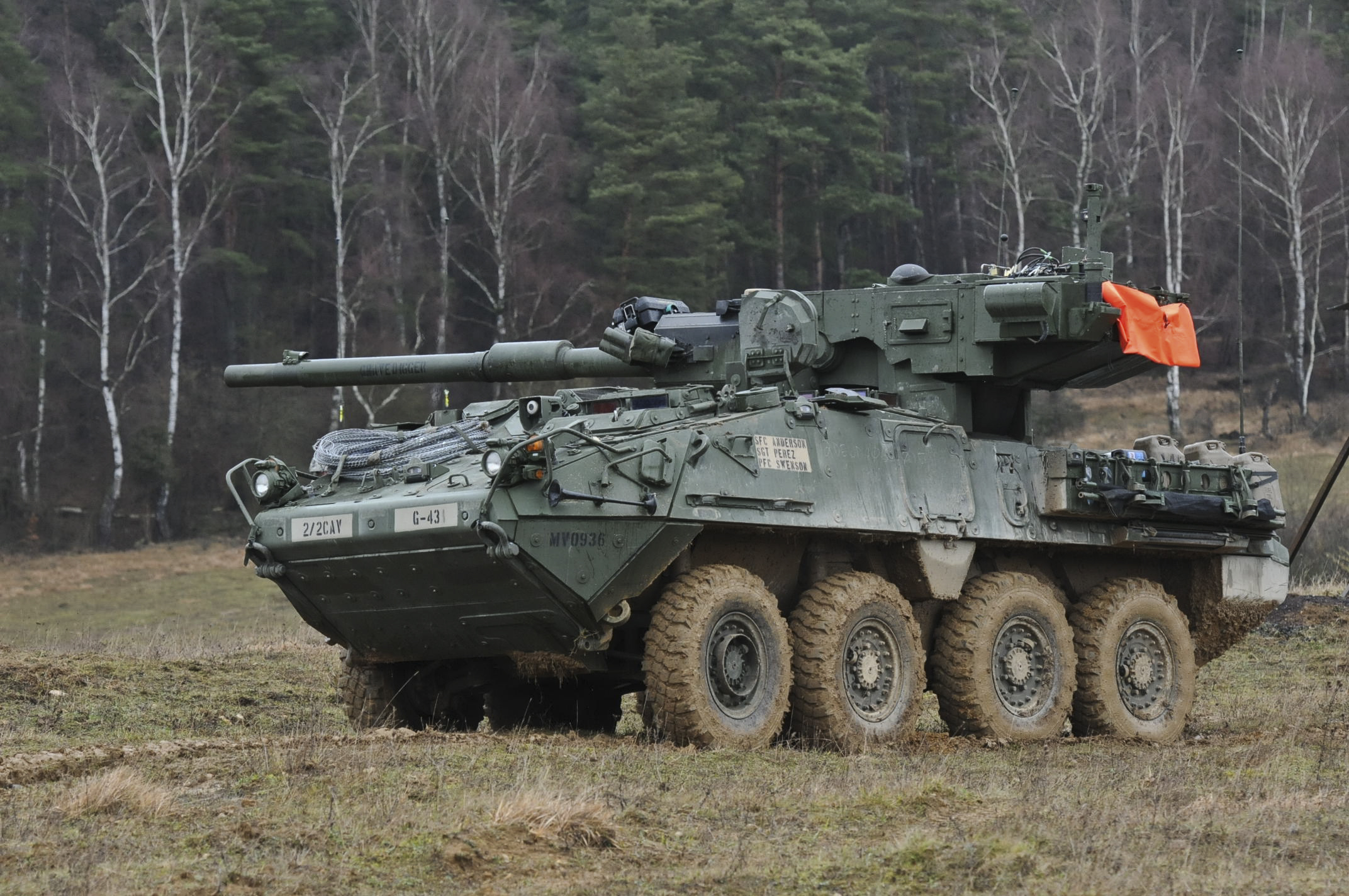
- A M1128 mobile gun system during a training exercise in 2015
- Type: Assault gun
- Place of origin: Canada and the United States

Service history
- Used by: United States Army (2007–2022)
- Wars: Iraq War; War in Afghanistan

Production history
- Designer: GM Defense of Canada, General Dynamics Land Systems
- Designed: 1999–2007
- Manufacturer: General Dynamics Land Systems
- Unit cost: US$5.26 million (2008)
- Produced: 2002–2010
- No. built: 142

Specifications
- Mass: 21.351 metric tons (23.535 short tons; 21.01 long tons)
- Length: 6.95 m (22.92 ft)
- Width: 2.72 m (8.97 ft)
- Height: >2.64 m (>8.72 ft)
- Crew: 3
- Armor: 14.5x114 mm resistant
- Main armament: M68A2 105 mm cannon
- Secondary armament: 7.62 mm machine gun; M240C coaxial machine gun; 2, M6 smoke grenade launchers
- Engine: Caterpillar C7 turbo diesel 260 kW (350 hp)
- Power/weight: 18.65 hp/ton
- Transmission: Automatic 6 forward, 1 reverse
- Suspension: 8×8 wheeled
- Ground clearance: 38 cm (15 in)
- Fuel capacity: 212 liters (56 US gallons; 47 Imperial gallons)
- Operational range: 528 km (330 mi)
- Maximum speed: 96 km/h (60 mph)

The M1128 mobile gun system (MGS) is an eight-wheeled assault gun of the Stryker family, mounting a 105 mm tank gun, based on the Canadian LAV III light-armored vehicle manufactured by General Dynamics Land Systems for the U.S. Army.

The MGS program emerged after the 1996 cancelation of the Army's M8 armored gun system, the service's planned replacement for the M551 Sheridan light tank.

The MGS was procured in limited numbers between 2002 to 2010. It has since been retired from active service by late 2022, due to design and operational deficiencies.

== History ==
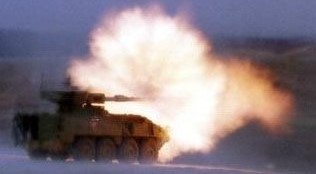
General Motors/GDLS–Canada LAV III mobile gun system entry in the platform performance demonstration at Fort Knox c. March 2000

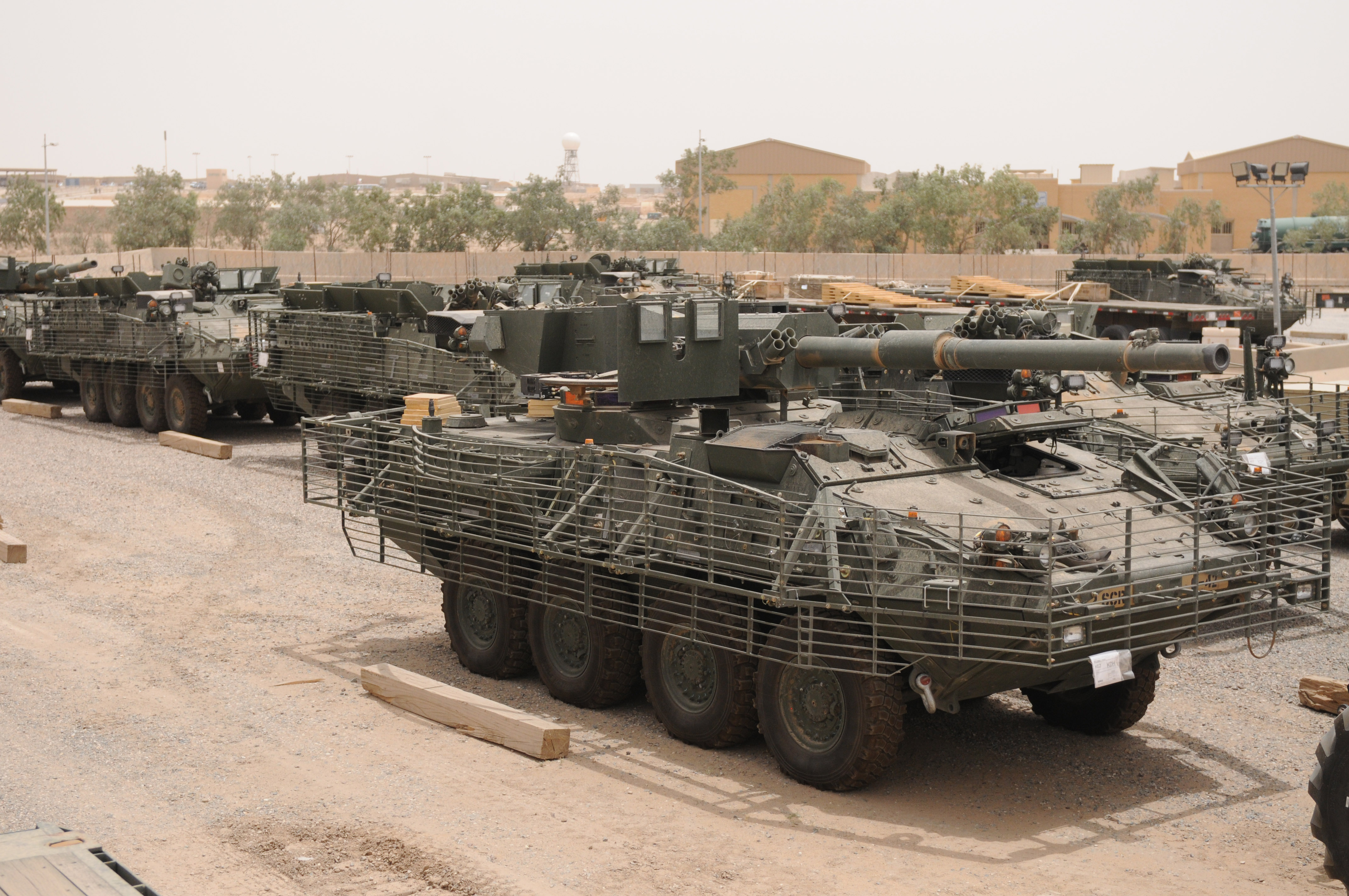
A mobile gun system and other Strykers shortly before being flown into Afghanistan in 2010.

=== Background: replacing the Sheridan ===
By 1992, the armored gun system (AGS) emerged as a top priority procurement program for the Army. The Army requested proposals for a 20-ton air-droppable light tank to replace the M551 Sheridan. The Army sought 300 AGS systems to go to the 82nd Airborne Division and the 2nd Armored Cavalry Regiment. Four competitive bids emerged. In June 1992, the Army selected the FMC Close Combat Vehicle, Light proposal. This was later type-classified as the M8 armored gun system. In 1996, the Army canceled the AGS due to the service's budgetary constraints.

The Iranian Revolution in the late 1970s and other Middle Eastern problems led to the Carter Doctrine, announcing that the Persian Gulf was of vital interest to the United States. In the 1980s the Rapid Deployment Joint Task Force gave way to U.S. Central Command. But it was quickly clear that heavy armoured forces (68-ton M1 Abrams and 33-ton M2/M3 Bradleys) would take too long to deploy, either by sea or air. They also needed large amounts of fuel, repair parts, and maintenance support. A more rapidly deployable and sustainable fighting vehicle was necessary. This led to the consideration of lighter, wheeled AFVs that could be delivered faster and would be less of a supply burden.

=== Interim armored vehicle competition ===
The General Dynamics mobile gun system originated from the Canadian armoured combat vehicle requirement. In partnership with General Motors, General Dynamics Land Systems (GDLS)–Canada integrated its low profile turret (LPT) onto a LAV III in January 1999. The turret was an updated version of the one used on the GD–Teledyne Expeditionary Tank, which was entered into the Armored Gun System competition in the 1980s.

In October 1999, U.S. Army Chief of Staff Eric Shinseki laid out his vision for a lighter, more transportable force. He called for mid-weight brigades that would strike a balance between heavy armor and infantry. The Army subsequently launched the Interim Armored Vehicle acquisition program. One of the required vehicles was the MGS. According to Shinseki, the MGS's mission differed greatly from the AGS. the AGS was also intended to be used in the anti-armor role, whereas primary targets for the MGS included bunkers, buildings, weapon positions and troops.

A team of GM Defense of Canada and GDLS submitted a variant of the LPT assault gun to meet the MGS requirement. General Dynamics was responsible for most of the MGS. United Defense LP proposed an M8 armored gun system (AGS) and two variants of the mobile tactical vehicle light (MTVL), one with the AGS turret and 105mm gun, and another with a 90mm gun. Two other competing contractors submitted bids for infantry carriers, but declined to submit offers for the MGS requirement.

Unlike the infantry carrier variant, MGS prototypes were not evaluated on the Army's proving grounds. This resulted in protests from lawmakers and industry officials. The service maintained that bid samples would be unnecessary and complicate the competition.

In September 2000, the Army told bidders it was considering plans to increase by 200 the number of MGS units purchased. Though the service did not say why it was interested in more MGS units, however Defense Daily speculated that the Army could equip light divisions with the MGS.

In November 2000, GM–GDLS won the contract for both the infantry carrier and MGS. The MGS was later type classified as the M1128. GM–GDLS was forced to suspend work on the IAV while the Government Accounting Office evaluated UDLP's protest of the award. GAO denied the protest in April 2001.

=== Further development and initial production ===
Soon after the contract was awarded, the MGS IOC date slipped two years from December 2001 to November 2003. The Army allowed GM–GDLS to substitute the Stryker ATGM variant for the MGS in the interim. In its protest, UDLP alleged that the Army had known about the schedule slippage before awarding the contract, and unfairly disregarded this in their decision making.

GDLS delivered the first of eight pre-production mobile gun systems in July 2002. A Western Design ammunition handling system was chosen to replace the Ares system. Pre-production models had problems with the autoloader, and the Army solicited proposals for a replacement ammunition handling system. A system by Western Design was chosen.

In March 2004, the Army approved the transfer of four AGS production vehicles to the 82nd Airborne Division to be used in Iraq. In June 2004, this plan was put on hold while the Army determined whether the MGS could meet the 82nd's requirements. In August, the Army conducted an air-drop test of a Stryker M1132 engineer squad vehicle weighted to simulate the load of the MGS. Around the same time, the Army identified issues with the air-dropability of the MGS, among the heavier of the Stryker family. Still more pervasive problems persisted with the autoloader. In January 2005, the Army said it had ruled out fielding the AGS, saying the system lacked a sufficient inventory of spare parts that would be required to maintain the vehicle. The Army doubled down on its support for the MGS, which it said it could begin fielding in summer 2006.

In October 2004, the Pentagon approved limited low-rate production of the MGS after a Defense Acquisition Board review. In December 2004, the Army awarded GDLS a $206 million contract for the production of 95 Strykers, including the first 14 limited production MGS systems. During limited production, 14 vehicles were produced. During this time, General Dynamics implemented fixes to the ammunition handling system to improve reliability. In November 2004, the Pentagon approved an Army request to move the vehicle into low-rate production, for a total of 72 vehicles. In August 2008, the Army awarded GDLS a $326.5 million contract for the production of 62 MGS.

In February 2008, the Pentagon approved full-rate production of the MGS after a Defense Acquisition Review. The Army chose to defer full-rate production while it waited to validate fixes made to the MGS. The Army deferred full-rate production in 2010.

In 2010, GDLS began incorporating explosive reactive armor on MGS production units.

In late 2013, the U.S. Army began seeking to reintroduce an airdroppable mobile airborne protected firepower platform to provide fire support for air assault forces, a capability that had been absent since the retirement of the Sheridan in 1997. General Dynamics initially considered modifying the wheeled Stryker MGS to meet the Mobile Protected Firepower (MPF) program requirement, but the company instead entered a variant of the Griffin light tank.

As of May 2016, 3 mobile gun systems had been written off during combat operations out of 142 produced.

=== Retirement ===
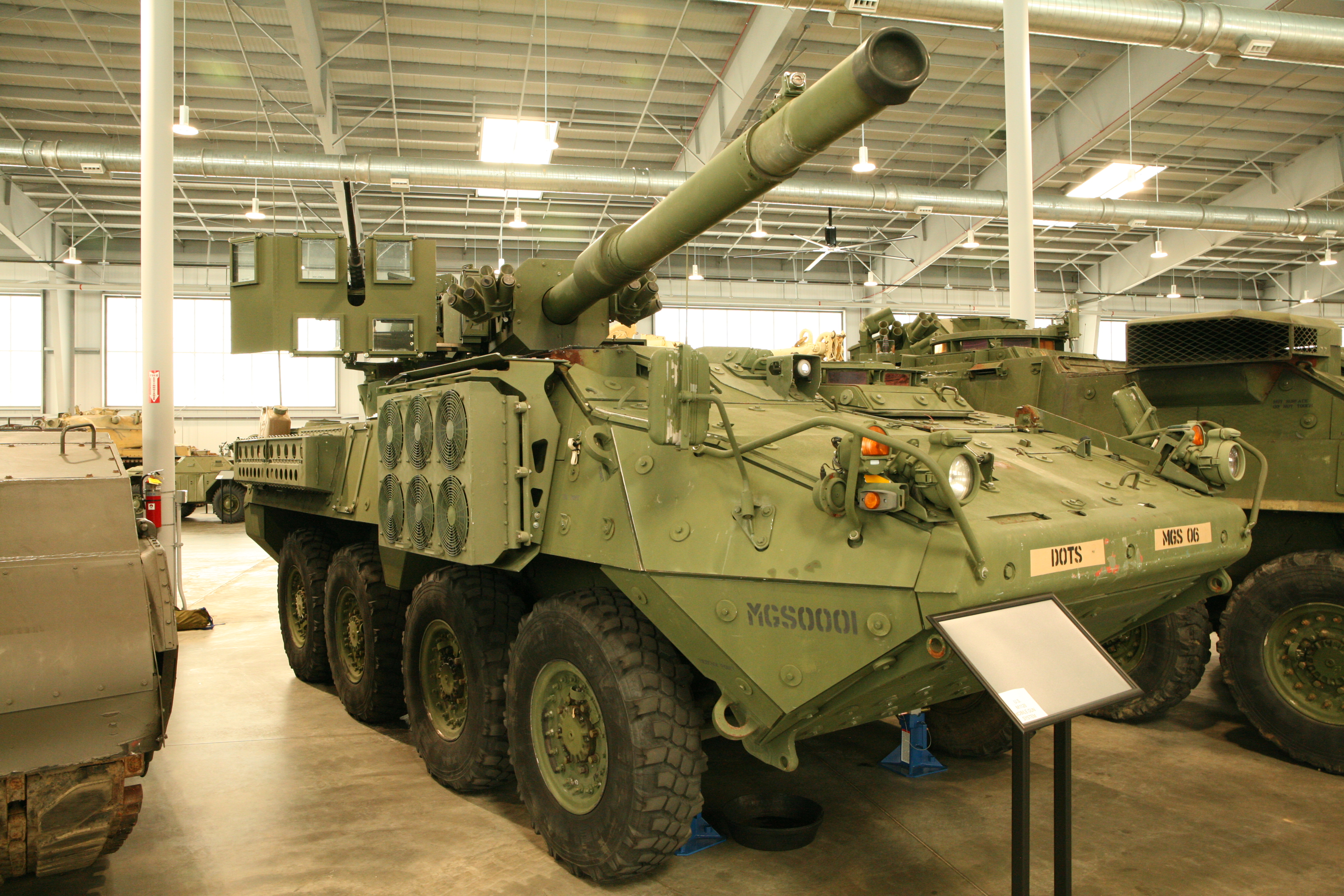
M1128 mobile gun system at the U.S. Army Armor and Cavalry Collection in 2023

In May 2021, the Army announced they would divest all mobile gun systems by the end of 2022. The decision was made following an analysis that found its autoloader had become expensive to maintain and that the M1128 had not been upgraded with a double V-hull. It was more efficient to eliminate the platform and focus on firepower improvements such as equipping Strykers with 30 mm cannons (M1296 Dragoon) and CROWS-J mounts, providing better distributed lethality capabilities that would not be lost from removing the MGS.

=== Foreign interest ===
Canada had liquidated about half of its fleet of Leopard 1 main battle tanks in the early 2000s. The Canadian Army planned to replace the MBTs with 66 mobile gun systems. However in 2007, the Canadian Army reversed itself and decided instead to procure Leopard 2.

== Combat use ==
The Stryker mobile gun system saw service in the Iraq War and the War in Afghanistan.

== Design ==
=== Armor and protection ===
The MGS has integral all-around armor protection against 14.5×114mm AP rounds. The Gross Weight of the production MGS is 21,351 kg (47,070 lbs), and the Curb Weight is 20,948 kg (45,190 lbs). A 2002 GM Defense brochure lists the MGS pilot vehicle as having a GVW of 18,733 kg (41,300 lb).

The MGS commander and gunner are located in the turret basket, which provides the crew some separation from the ammunition in the event of an explosion. According to a Government Accounting Office report released in May 2001, the Army had expressed doubt that this arrangement would provide "any protection from secondary explosions and fires from the main gun ammunition."

=== Firepower ===
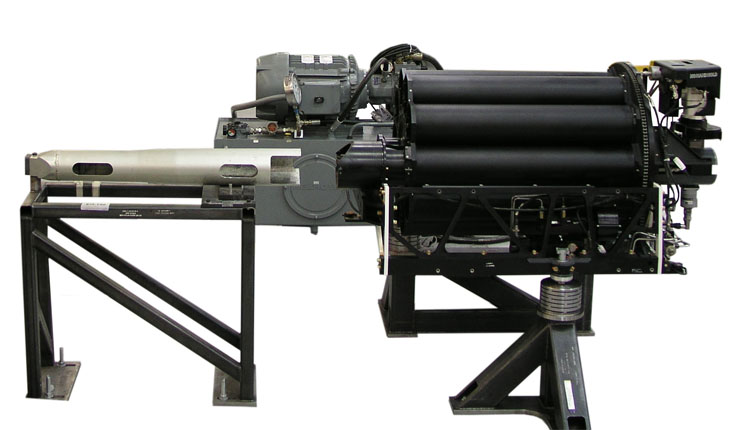
Autoloader

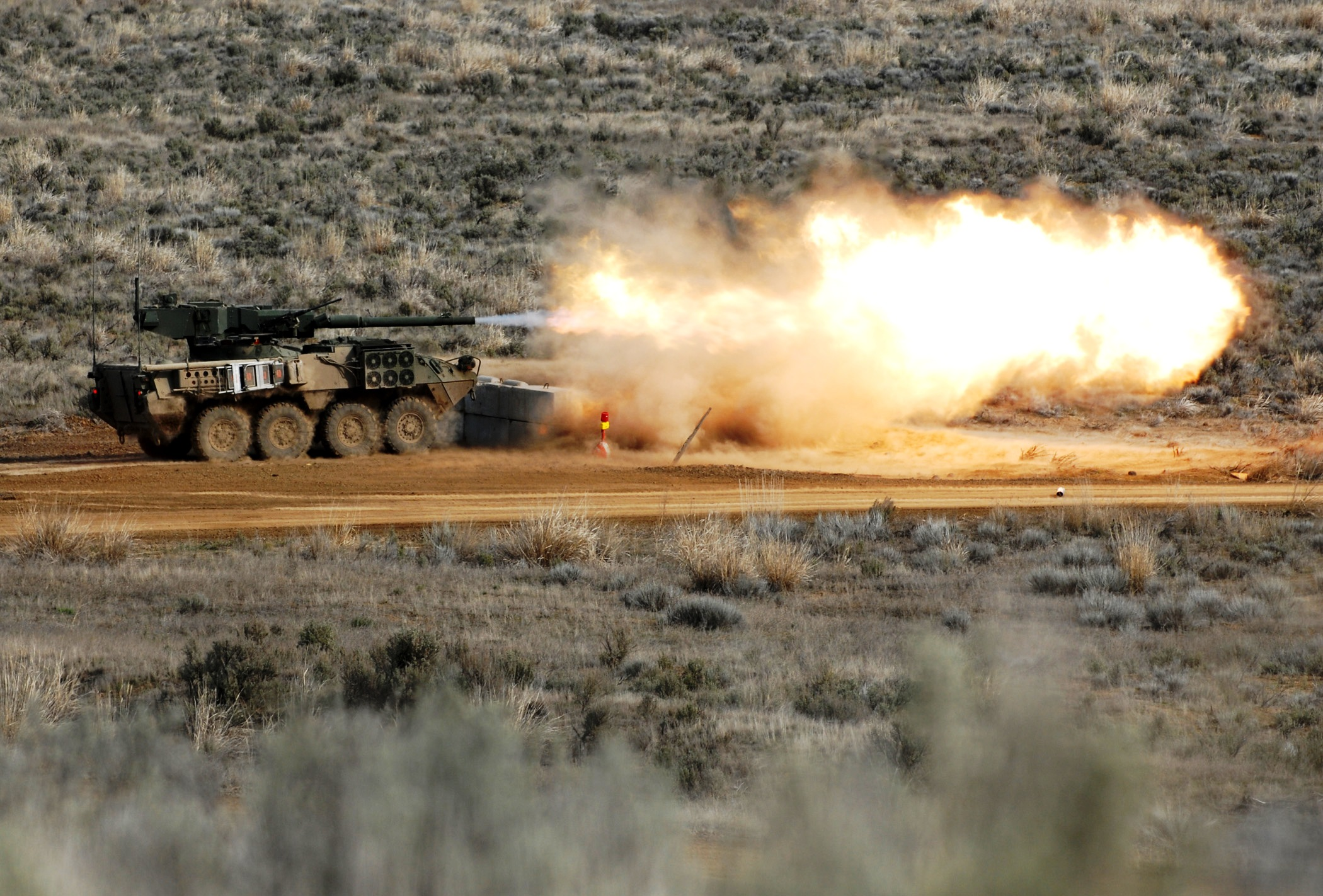
A mobile gun system firing in 2011

The MGS's low profile turret has a small silhouette, is stabilized and mounts a 105mm M68A1E4 or M68A2 rifled cannon with a fume extractor and an autoloader. The vehicle is primarily outfitted to support infantry combat operations. While it could take on some of the roles of a tank, it is not primarily intended or designed to engage in combat with main battle tanks.

The MGS originally used Ares ammunition handling system (AHS). The Ares AHS was an off-the-shelf autoloader and rammer coupled to a new replenisher. The AHS used during the platform performance demonstration used a nine-round carousel autoloader and no replenisher while preproduction models used an eight-round autoloader. The first pre-production models of the MGS delivered in 2002 had difficulty with aligning rounds while transferring them from the replenisher to the autoloader. The Army directed GDLS to select a new AHS design. A General Dynamics Robotics Systems and a Western Design AHS were considered and the latter was chosen. The Western Design AHS replaced the replenisher to reduce the complexity of the auto-loading and replenishing mechanisms. The Ares replenisher selected in 2004 had consisted of two five-round drums, whereas the Western Design replenisher consisted of one ten-round drum.

The MGS can store 18 rounds of main gun ammunition: 8 in the autoloader's carousel and 10 in a replenisher located at the rear of the vehicle. It has a rate of fire of ten rounds per minute.

The MGS was originally developed for the Canadian Army, which did not have a requirement for transporting the vehicle via C-130. The U.S. Army did have this requirement, and so a design change was required to lower the MGS's height so that the vehicle could fit inside the aircraft. The turret was lowered within the hull. This change caused problems of its own. The reduced distance between the muzzle brake and the hull caused blast overpressures to develop. A solution was found where the "pepper pot" could be covered by a sheet of metal.

The MGS's 105 mm cannon can fire four types of ammunition: the M900 kinetic energy penetrator to destroy armored vehicles; the M456A2 high-explosive anti-tank round to destroy thin-skinned vehicles and provide anti-personnel fragmentation; the M393A3 high-explosive squash head plastic round to destroy bunkers, machine gun and sniper positions, and create openings in walls for infantry to access; and M1040 canister shot for use against dismounted infantry in open terrain.

In 2001, Rheinmetall announced that it was seeking to incorporate its 105 mm smoothbore low recoil gun on the MGS around 2004. The Army had not articulated such a requirement.

By 2000, the Army found its existing ammunition stockpile of 105 mm rounds to be in poor condition, with more than half determined to be either unusable or obsolete. The Army solicited industry to produce new ammunition to replenish the stockpile. L3 Communications completed low rate production of M393 high-explosive plastic HEP-T and M467 training rounds in 2004. 10,000 combat and 18,400 training rounds were ultimately produced by L3.

==== Secondary armament ====
The coaxial weapon is an 7.62 mm caliber M240 machine gun. The commander's weapon is a M2 Browning 12.7 mm machine gun or a 40 mm Mk 19 grenade launcher can be mounted.

=== Differential attributes and failures ===
Because the vehicle was originally designed without air conditioning (A/C), crews were given cooling vests that circulate cooled water from outside the vehicle to the garment. Vehicle computers still overheated regularly. All MGS Stryker platforms have since been upgraded with A/C units. The large weapon station and relatively smaller hatch can make emergency exits difficult.

The main cannon is separate from the crew compartment. A gun stoppage during combat can be cleared only by exiting the vehicle.

M1128 suffered of lack of reliability, excessive dead space, gun size, and gun control issues, taking its development to a limited production in 2010 with 142 units in service.

=== Organization ===
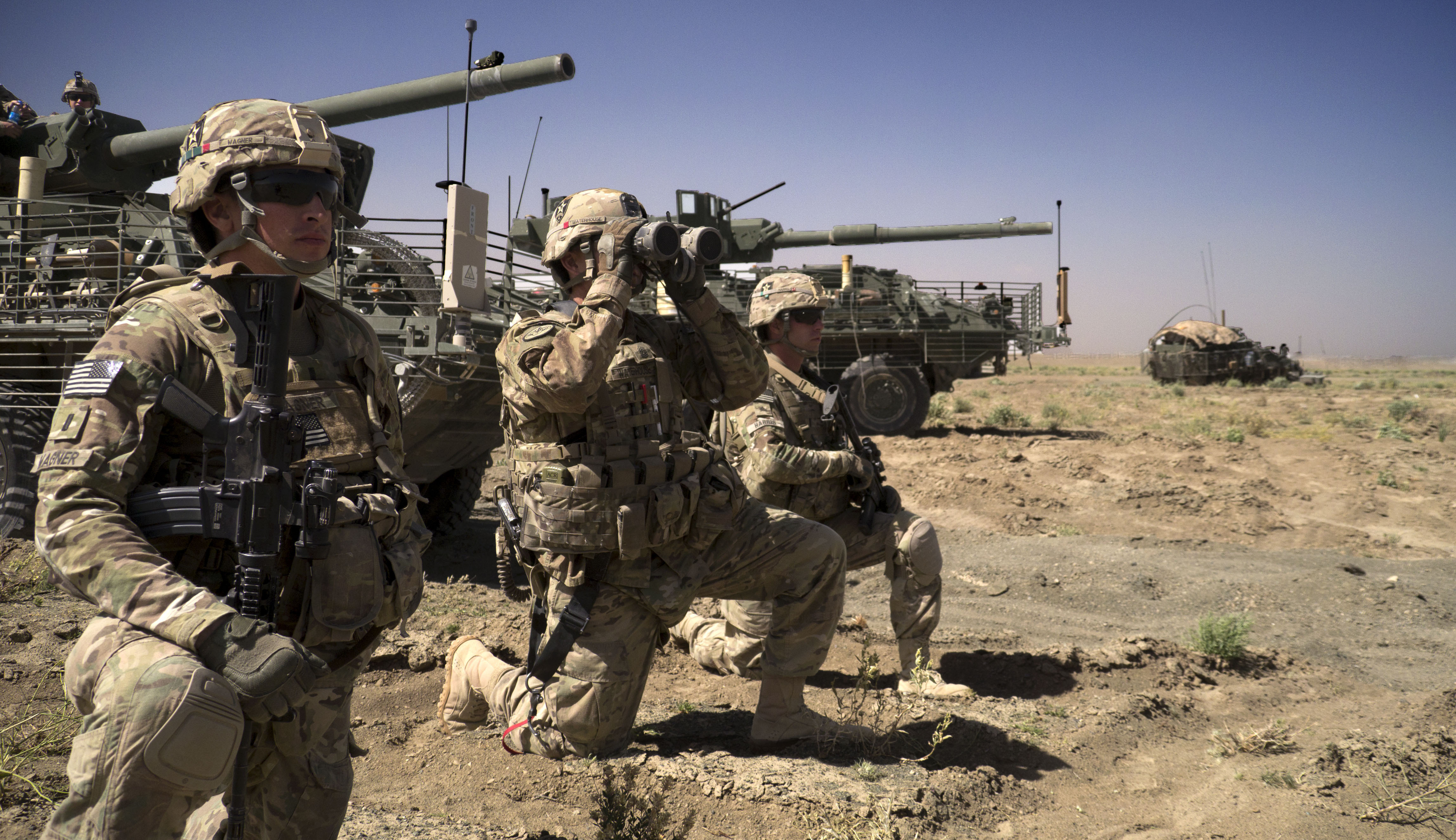
US Army soldiers with M1128 MGS variant Strykers using combined arms doctrine for a modern warfare operation during the War in Afghanistan, 2013

As originally projected the U.S. Army allocated nine mobile gun systems (3 per infantry company) to a battalion, making for 27 mobile gun systems per "Stryker brigade" in 2013, but later the Army cut the number per brigade to 10.

As of May 2017, a Stryker brigade combat team is equipped with three platoons of MGS Strykers and three platoons of ATGM Strykers in its weapons troop.

The Army purchased 142 mobile gun systems in total. Three were lost in combat. The Army planned to authorize 32 mobile gun systems to a Stryker Brigade Combat Team (BCT). However due to the low numbers produced, only nine were allocated to a BCT.

A three-vehicle MGS platoon operates organic to a Stryker infantry company, with one MGS in support of a Stryker infantry platoon.

== See also ==
- 2S14 Zhalo-S – (Soviet Union)
- Alvis Saladin – (United Kingdom)
- AMX-10 RC – (France)
- AMOS – (Finland)
- B1 Centauro – (Italy)
- LAV-600 – (United States)
- Panhard EBR – (France)
- Rooikat – (South Africa)
- ZTL-11 – (China)
- Type 16 maneuver combat vehicle – (Japan)
- M1134 anti-tank guided missile vehicle, a Stryker tank destroyer variant
- M8 armored gun system, a U.S. Army light tank acquisition program canceled in 1996
- MGM-166 LOSAT, a canceled U.S. Army line-of-sight missile
- Mobile Protected Firepower, a U.S. Army light tank program, was cancelled in 2025
- XM1202 Mounted Combat System, a U.S. Army Future Combat Systems 20-ton tank canceled in 2011
- XM1219 armed robotic vehicle, a U.S. Army Future Combat Systems unmanned ground combat vehicle canceled in 2011
