= Armored Systems Modernization =

Combat vehicle procurement program of United States Army

The Armored Systems Modernization (ASM) was a U.S. Army combat vehicle procurement program canceled in 1992. The Army sought to develop a family of six armored vehicles based on two common chassis, one heavy and one medium, which would both share commonalities. Systems that the ASM sought to replace included the M1 Abrams main battle tank, M109 howitzer and M2 Bradley infantry fighting vehicle. The Army spun out several of the systems—Advanced Field Artillery System, Line-of-Sight Anti-Tank and the Armored Gun System—after canceling the program, but all of these programs were eventually canceled.

== History ==
The ASM program began in the mid-1980s, when the Army planned to simultaneously develop, produce, and field 24 new combat vehicles, including tanks, self-propelled artillery, infantry fighting vehicles, and other armored systems, under what was called the "Armored Family of Vehicles Program". The Army planned to base its armored modernization approach on a family of vehicles with a common chassis and common modular components. Army studies showed that using a common chassis and common components could reduce future operational and support costs. However, the Army's effort was dramatically scaled back because of the high costs involved in developing and producing so many different systems. In March 1985, the Army downsized the program to its six highest priority vehicles: four to be built on a heavy common chassis (weighing 55 to 62 tons) and two on a medium chassis (weighing up to 36 tons). The downsized program was renamed the "Heavy Force Modernization Program".

In February 1990, the Army added a light, direct-fire weapon—the Armored Gun System (AGS)—and renamed the program "Armored Systems Modernization."

In July 1990, the Senate Armed Services Committee (SASC) passed markup requiring that the Army develop the Advanced Field Artillery System (AFAS) first, rather than the Block III tank as the Army intended. In October, the Senate Appropriations Committee (SAC) passed similar language deferring the Block III main battle tank and zeroing the $113 million R&D request for the Block III tank. The House Armed Services Committee directed the Army to make the AGS its top priority modernization program. In September 1991, for FY1992 SAC slashed $125 million from the Advanced Technology Transition Demonstrator ATTD) common chassis in a move some industry officials characterized as a wake-up call for the Army. The Army had not been responsive to Congressional calls to prioritize AFAS. Funding for ATTD was restored in a conference report accompanying the Defense Appropriations Bill, however overall ASM funding was reduced $100 million. In a memo to Congress in October 1991, the Army agreed to align its strategy with Congress.

In December 1990, the Army awarded Teledyne Motors and Armored Vehicle Technologies Associated (a joint venture of FMC Corporation and General Dynamics Land Systems Division) a contract to develop ASM Advanced Technology Transition Demonstrators. Teledyne received $343 million and Armored Vehicles received $287 million.

Both the heavy and medium chassis would share some commonalities.

In response to funding shortfall estimates beyond fiscal year 1997, the Defense Acquisition Board reviewed the Army's ASM program and directed that the Army develop a more realistic acquisition program. In its response, the Army insisted that the ASM program was affordable. The Army added a prototype phase to each of the vehicles at the direction of the Board in August 1990. The Board wanted the prototype phase to minimize integration risks brought about by the separate development of the common chassis and individual weapon components.

In December 1991, Army Secretary Michael P. W. Stone proposed delaying the Block III tank, Future Infantry Fighting Vehicle, and Combat Mobility Vehicle. The Advanced Field Artillery System (AFAS) and Future Armored Resupply Vehicle-Ammunition (FARV-A) were given top priority, as requested by Congress. In March, the Congressional Budget Office proposed cutting ASM funding to $100 million over the following five years. In June, the Army delivered a plan that would additionally cut back on funding for LOSAT. The plan called for wrapping up the common chassis program by May 1993. Later in June, the Office of the Secretary of Defense approved the Army's plan. Under the plan the Army would reduce the scope of the common chassis contracts, with termination occurring in FY23.

In October 1992, the Army canceled Armored Systems Modernization due to changing budgetary priorities due to the collapse of the Soviet Union. The Army restructured two contracts worth $629 million between Teledyne Continental Motors and Armored Vehicle Technologies Associated. The funds were directed towards engine and electric drive system research.

Comparison of variants
Name	Vehicle replaced	Acquisition target
Block III tank	M1 Abrams	1946
Future Infantry Fighting Vehicle (FIFV)	M2 Bradley	1321
Combat Mobility Vehicle (CMV)	M728 Combat Engineer Vehicle & M9	258
Advanced Field Artillery System (AFAS)	M109 howitzer	824
Future Armored Resupply Vehicle (FARV)	M992 Field Artillery Ammunition Support Vehicle & M548	824
Line-of-Sight Antitank System (LOSAT)	M901 ITV	907

== Heavy Chassis ==
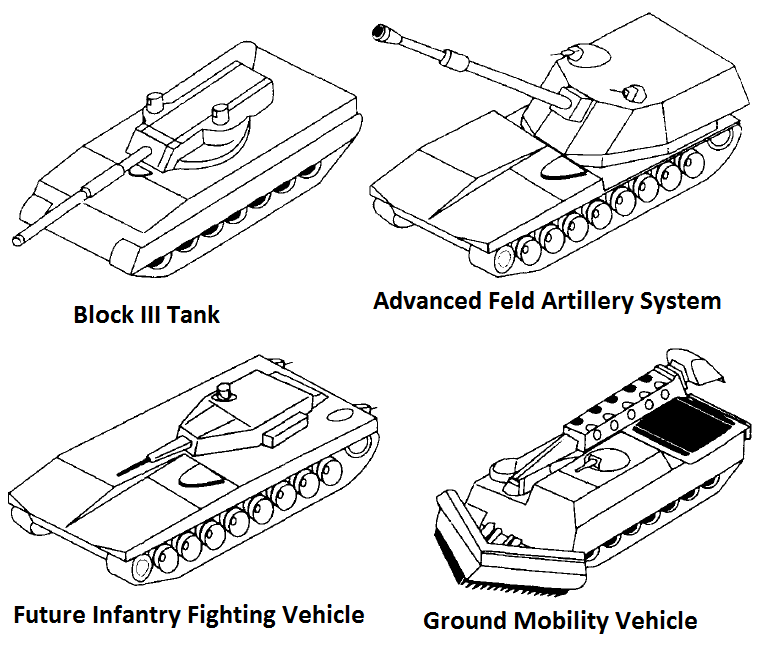
Army conception of Heavy Chassis variants

The Army developed the heavy chassis using a two-pronged development strategy: an in-house Army component development and test program and a competitive contractor development phase.

The four systems to be built on a common heavy chassis were the Block III tank, a main battle tank; the Combat Mobility Vehicle, an engineering vehicle for mine clearance and other engineering tasks; the Advanced Field Artillery System, a self-propelled howitzer; and the Future Infantry Fighting Vehicle, an infantry fighting vehicle. The chassis will have certain common elements such as engines, transmissions, suspensions, modular armor, and tracks. The ASM common heavy chassis could have actually been two chassis, one with the engine in the rear and one with the engine in the front because tanks traditionally have had the engine in the rear, while self-propelled artillery and infantry fighting vehicles have had the engine in the front. However, the chassis were required to be sufficiently similar to permit production on a single assembly line.

The Army's initial development priority was the Block III tank, with the other heavy chassis systems to follow.

The Army planned for each of the three remaining heavy chassis systems to go through a technology demonstrator phase prior to the start of prototype development. The award of the demonstrator contracts was scheduled for the Combat Mobility Vehicle and for the Advanced Field Artillery System in fiscal year 1991 and for the Future Infantry Fighting Vehicle in fiscal year 1993. The demonstrator for the Combat Mobility Vehicle would integrate obstacle-breaching components on a surrogate tank chassis. The demonstrator for the Advanced Field Artillery System would integrate a new artillery cannon and fire control system on a surrogate chassis. The demonstrator for the Future Infantry Fighting Vehicle would integrate a new cannon and fire control system on a modified existing chassis.

The Army planned to award prototype development contracts for the other three vehicles in 1994. The prototypes would integrate each system's unique weapons on the common heavy chassis. The full-scale development phase would begin in 1998 for the Advanced Field Artillery System and the Combat Mobility Vehicle and in 1997 for the Future Infantry Fighting Vehicle. Vehicle production was scheduled to begin in 2001 for the Advanced Field Artillery System and Future Infantry Fighting Vehicle and in 2002 for the Combat Mobility Vehicle. The scheduled first-unit-equipped dates were 2003 for the Advanced Field Artillery System and 2004 for the remaining two vehicles.

=== Block III tank ===
The Army's initial development priority was the Block III, with the other heavy chassis systems to follow.

The Block III was the service's replacement for the M1 Abrams. Two gun tubes, 120 mm and 140 mm, were developed for the Advanced Tank Cannon System. The 140 mm tube was considered necessary if the Soviets ever developed an advanced main battle tank. The service figured that the smaller barrel could be fitted when the situation did not call for the larger gun.

In fiscal year 1990, the Army began work on the in-house phase when it began to develop a "test bed", a modified M1 Abrams chassis that was used to test components for the common heavy chassis, such as the engine, transmission, and suspension, and for the Block III tank's weapon system, including the fire control, new 140 mm gun, and autoloader. This effort was scheduled to continue through fiscal year 1993.

In December 1990, the Army awarded contracts to Teledyne Continental Motors and to Armored Vehicle Technologies Associated (a joint venture of General Dynamics Land Systems and FMC Corporation) for the competitive design and development of a common heavy chassis. This effort was scheduled to continue through the first quarter of fiscal year 1994. The contractors could use either the Army developed or independently developed components.

After the chassis was developed, the Army planned to select one of the contractors to develop the tank. This selection was scheduled for fiscal year 1994, and the selected contractor was required to develop a prototype tank integrating the common heavy chassis with the tank weapons components.

The contractor was allowed to choose which weapons components to use. The prototype tank phase was scheduled to end in 1997, and full-scale tank development was scheduled to begin later that year. Block III tank production was scheduled to start in the fourth quarter of fiscal year 2001, with the first unit equipped in the second quarter of 2003.

In June 1991 the House denied funding for the 140 mm gun.

In December 1991, Army Secretary Michael P. W. Stone proposed delaying the Block III tank, and the Advanced Field Artillery System and Future Armored Resupply Vehicle-Ammunition replaced the Block III as the service's first ASM priority.

=== Future Infantry Fighting Vehicle ===
The Future Infantry Fighting Vehicle was the M2 Bradleys intended successor. It was expected to have a more lethal autocannon, improved anti-tank missile system. The crew was reduced from three, of the Bradley, to two.

=== Advanced Field Artillery System ===
The Advanced Field Artillery System (AFAS), the successor to the M109 howitzer, was armed with a 155 mm L/52 gun capable of firing at least 12 rounds a minute. Ammunition storage was increased. AFAS required fewer crew members and incorporated a computer fire control system.

=== Combat Mobility Vehicle ===
The award of the demonstrator contracts was scheduled for the in fiscal year 1991. The demonstrator for the Combat Mobility Vehicle would integrate obstacle-breaching components on a surrogate tank chassis. The Army planned to award prototype development contracts for the CMV in 1994. The full-scale development phase would begin in 1998. Production would begin in 2002. First-unit-equipped would occur in 2004.

In April 1991, the Army awarded BMY Combat Systems a $10.9 million contract for a CMV Advanced Technology Transition Demonstrator. A near-term solution was eventually desired so the contract was modified in September 1992. This became the "Breacher".

== Medium Chassis ==
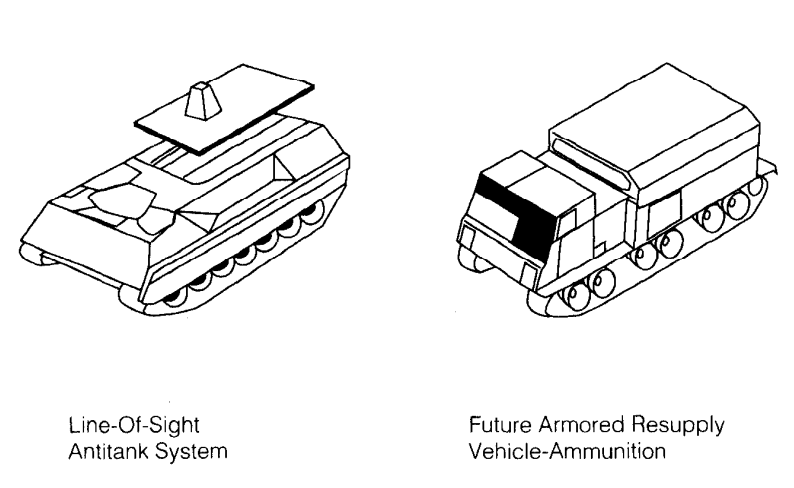
LOSAT and FARV

The ASM Program plans called for two systems to be built on a common medium chassis: the Line-of-Sight Anti-Tank system, a vehicle carrying a high-speed, kinetic-energy anti-tank missile; and the Future Armored Resupply Vehicle-Ammunition, an artillery resupply vehicle for the Advanced Field Artillery System. However, while work on requirements for a medium chassis were underway, these systems would initially be integrated on a surrogate modified Bradley Fighting Vehicle chassis.

=== Line-of-Sight Anti-Tank ===
The Line-of-Sight Anti-Tank vehicle was the intended successor to the M901 Improved TOW Vehicle.

The Army initiated development of the LOSAT missile prior to the ASM program. LOSAT was tested on a surrogate chassis.

The Army tested the missile from 1990 to 1991. On December 5, 1990, the Defense Acquisition Board approved continued development of the missile. The Army planned to begin full-scale development of the system in early 1992, with production in 1997.

As of July 1990, the chassis was planned to be based on the Bradley Fighting Vehicle.

=== Future Armored Resupply Vehicle-Ammunition ===
Future Armored Resupply Vehicle-Ammunition (FARV-A) was the planned replacement for the M992 Field Artillery Ammunition Support Vehicle. FARV-A was a companion vehicle to the Advanced Field Artillery System. FARV-A allowed crews to supply ammunition under armor (i.e. without leaving their vehicle).

The Army planned to initiate advanced development of the FARV-A in fiscal year 1991. The advanced development phase would demonstrate technologies for ammunition stowage and advanced material handling on a modified Bradley Fighting Vehicle chassis (A Multiple Launch Rocket System as of July 1990). The Army planned to begin the prototype development phase for the vehicle in 1994, with full-scale development to follow in 1997 and production in 2002. The Army struggled to find the needed funding for the vehicle before the end of fiscal year 1991.

== Armored Gun System ==
A third vehicle, added in February 1990, constituted the third, light category of vehicle called the Armored Gun System. The Army planned to buy 300 of these to replace the M551 Sheridan light tank. Select models were designed to be air-dropped from a C-130. In 1992 the Army selected FMC Corporation's Close Combat Vehicle Light. This was redesignated as the M8 Armored Gun System. The AGS was canceled just before production in 1996 due to budget constraints.

== See also ==
- Interim Armored Vehicle, a U.S. Army program that resulted in the acquisition of the Stryker
- Future Combat Systems Manned Ground Vehicles, A U.S. Army combat vehicle acquisition program canceled in 2011
- Expeditionary Fighting Vehicle, U.S. Marine Corps amphibious assault vehicle
- Combat Vehicle Reconnaissance (Tracked), an earlier British concept

== Sources ==
- Hinton, Henry; Shafer, F. James; Gaston, Lawrence (July 1991). Armored Systems Modernization: Program Inconsistent With Current Threat and Budgetary Constraints (PDF) (Report). Government Accounting Office.
- Ross Dennis, Boelke (June 1992). A Historical Summary of the Armored Systems Modernization Program and the Lessons Learned From Its Interaction With the Acquisition Environment (PDF) (Master's thesis). Naval Postgraduate School. Archived from the original (PDF) on 2013-10-05.
