= Expeditionary Tank =

- Type: Light tank
- Place of origin: United States

Production history
- Designer: Teledyne Vehicle Systems
- Designed: early 1980s
- Manufacturer: Teledyne Vehicle Systems and General Dynamics Land Systems (GDLS)
- Produced: mid-1980s (prototype)

Specifications
- Mass: 21 t (21 long tons; 23 short tons)
- Length: 7 m (23 ft 0 in)
- Width: 3.6 m (11 ft 10 in)
- Height: 2.8 m (9 ft 2 in)
- Crew: 3 (commander, driver and gunner)
- Main armament: 105 mm M68A1 gun
- Secondary armament: 7.62 mm M240 machine gun (coaxial); 7.62 mm M60D machine gun, 7.62 mm M240 machine gun, 12.7 mm M2HB machine gun or 40 mm automatic grenade launcher (optional)
- Engine: Cummins VTA-903T 8-cylinder diesel 500 horsepower (370 kW)
- Transmission: GDLS HMPT-500 hydro-mechanical transmission
- Suspension: hydropneumatic
- Maximum speed: 45–50 mph (72–80 km/h)

The Expeditionary Tank was a light tank developed in the 1980s initially by Teledyne Vehicle Systems. Later joined by General Dynamics Land Systems (GDLS), the companies entered the US Army's Armored Gun System (AGS) competition with the design. Since the tank never entered service, it did not receive an official designation. Alternative names for the Expeditionary Tank include the Teledyne Light Tank and the Slammer.

== Development ==
In the late 1970s, Teledyne carried out multiple studies on a highly mobile light tracked vehicle design, which could be used for a variety of tasks. The in-house trials lasted from 1980 to 1981 and in 1982, a detailed design had been developed, which Teledyne designated the Light, Future Armored Combat System (LFACS). The joint entry by Teledyne and GDLS into the AGS competition was based on the LFACS design.

The prototype hull was completed in December 1983, and the turret was completed by mid-1984. In October, testing took place in the Nevada test center on mobility and reliability, and in April 1985, the chassis and turret were united. A month later, the vehicle was presented for the first time at the U.S. Army Armor Conference at Fort Knox. Test firing took place in 1986.

In 1992, the Expeditionary Tank design lost out in the AGS competition to FMC Corporation's and United Defense's Close Combat Vehicle, Light (CCVL), which was type classified as the M8 Armored Gun System. The Expeditionary Tank and its low-profile turret were offered for export by Teledyne and later GDLS, but no orders materialised.

== Design ==
Teledyne defined key requirements that shaped the tank's design:

- roll-on, roll-off air transportability in C-130 and C-141 aircraft with the capability to use LAPES;
- maximum use of off-the-shelf components;
- a 105 mm main gun with an autoloader;
- a fire control system as accurate as the M60A3 main battle tank;
- high cross-country mobility;
- a low profile to increase survivability.

The Expeditionary Tank was an unconventional design with an externally mounted overhead autoloaded gun, a crew in-hull configuration and a front-mounted engine. The unmanned turret was located in the rear section of the vehicle, above the fighting compartment. All three crewmembers were positioned in the hull, the driver sat in the driver's compartment that was separated from the fighting compartment with a bulkhead. The commander and the gunner sat side by side in the fighting compartment.

The tank had light armour that consisted of rolled homogeneous armour, a steel and ceramic composite, ballistic aluminium and Kevlar, and ceramic appliques that offered protection against 23 mm autocannon shells from the front and against 7.62–14.5 mm machine gun bullets from the sides. Protection level could be increased or decreased depending on the threat level or delivery method via bolt-on armour plates. The Expeditionary Tank had a double-spaced hull floor to improve protection against mines.

The Expeditionary Tank was armed with an autoloaded 105 mm M68A1 rifled gun and a coaxial 7.62 mm M240 machine gun. The M68A1 gun was expected to be replaced by the M35 tank gun in production vehicles. It also had an optional weapon mount for the commander's position, which could have been equipped with a machine gun (7.62 mm or 12.7 mm) or a 40 mm automatic grenade launcher. The commander and gunner were seated below the turret in an aluminum basket with spall liners. Ammunition for the externally mounted gun was located in the hull.

The tank design used many off-the-shelf components to reduce development costs and time. It shared multiple components with the M2/M3 Bradley, notably the Cummins VTA-903T diesel engine and GDLS HMPT-500 hydro-mechanical transmission. The electric turret drive with a manual backup was also initially developed for the Bradley. The prototype also used the M68A1 gun instead of the then-experimental M35.

== Fate ==
The joint venture between Teledyne and GDLS lost the AGS competition to the CCVL design that would become the M8 Armored Gun System. The tank was offered to export customers without success. Its low-profile turret design was more successful.

Teledyne offered the turret developed for the tank for export. It was tested on the Centurion Mk 5 hull and an installation kit was designed for the M60. The company proposed the low-profile turret as a part of an upgrade package for Patton tanks, T-54/55/62 series tanks, the AMX-30 and the Centurion.

In 1999, a version of the turret was integrated onto the LAV III armored personnel carrier chassis. A modified version of the design was submitted to the Interim Armored Vehicle competition. Having won the competition, the improved design became the M1128 mobile gun system.

The fate of the Expeditionary Tank prototype is unclear. Photos from a blog posted in 2014 indicate that the hull of the tank was outside the former Teledyne plant in Muskegon, Michigan. No evidence is available about the fate of the turret, although it is probable that the turret was used for testing in other development programmes after the failed AGS bid.
