= Tiam (tank) =

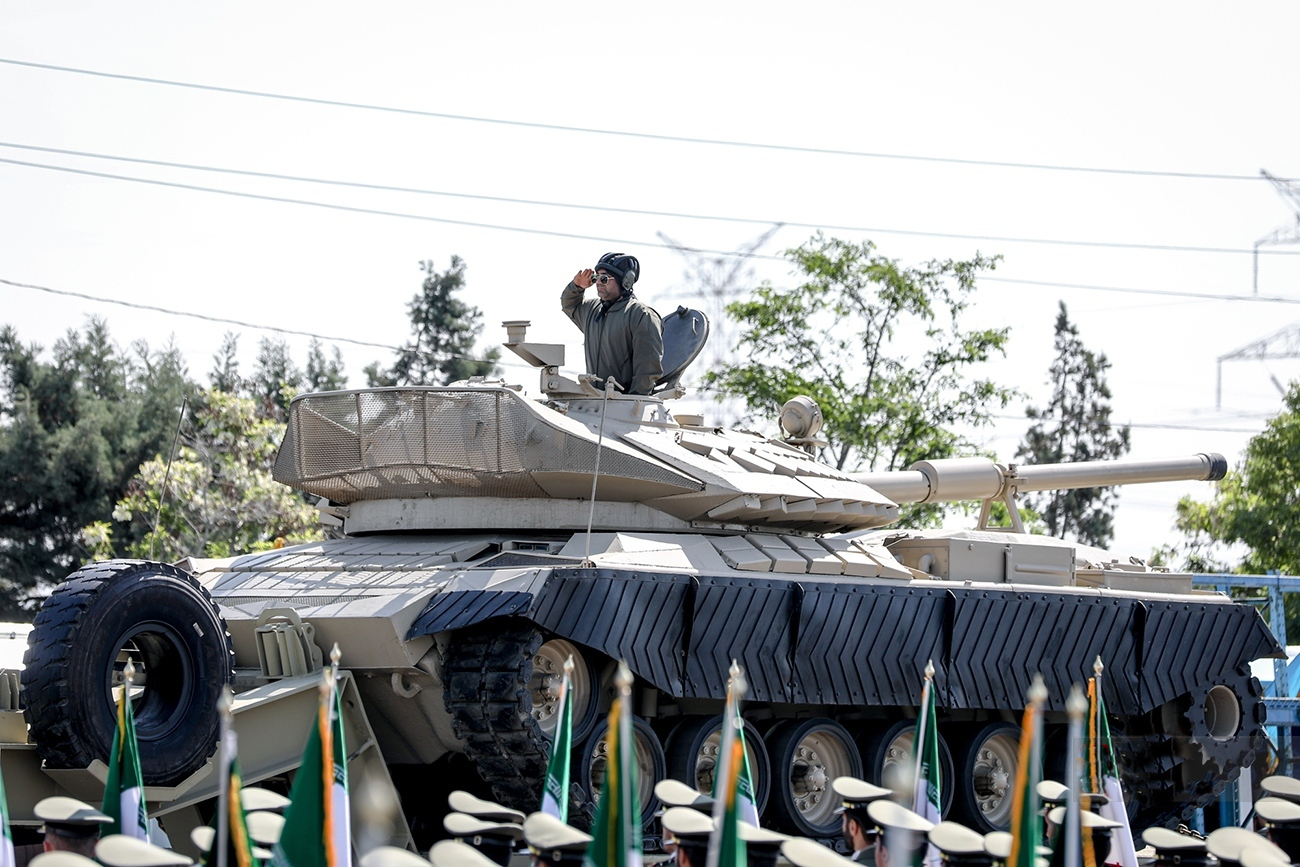
- Tiam in 2023
- Type: Main battle tank
- Place of origin: Iran

Service history
- Used by: Iran

Production history
- Produced: 2016–present

Specifications
- Mass: 44.1 tons
- Length: 8.51 m (hull)
- Width: 3.4 m
- Height: 3.35 m
- Crew: 4 (Gunner, Commander, Loader and Driver)
- Armor: Applique composite armor, with ERA
- Main armament: 105 mm smoothbore gun based on the 105 mm M68
- Secondary armament: 12.7 mm machine gun 7.62 mm machine gun
- Engine: Continental AVDS-1790-2A diesel 750 hp (560 kW) at 2400 rpm
- Suspension: Torsion bar
- Operational range: 600 km
- Maximum speed: 56 km/h

Tiam (چشم ها lit. Eyes) is an Iranian main battle tank optimized from the Sabalan with a 105 mm gun. The tank was announced on April 13, 2016, and has a similarity to the Type 59 turret, with a Sabalan chassis, which is an Iranian modernized version of the M47M Patton. Iran stated that it possessed a brand new turret housing a smoothbore 105 mm cannon. Iran said it had a new fire control system, and new communication equipment, sideskirts and other improvements and cost less than half of the price of the Zulfiqar main battle tank.

== History ==
Before the fall of the Shah, Iran obtained modernized versions from the United States of the M47 Patton, known as the M47M.

After the Tiam was unveiled to the public in April 2016, Ground Force Commander Brigadier General Ahmad Reza Pourdastan announced there would also be a new Karrar main battle tanks.

== Design ==
Iran created the Tiam tank from a modernized version of the M47M and a modified Chinese Type 59 turret.

The main armament of the Tiam consists of a 105 mm smoothbore gun fitted with a fume extractor and a thermal sleeve. It has a crew of four, including commander, gunner, loader and driver and has a coaxial 7.62 mm machine gun and a 12.7 mm DShK heavy machine gun mounted on swivel station at the commander hatch.

The Tiam was fitted with latest generation of composite armor, with explosive reactive armor (ERA) panels mounted on the front of the hull and turret.
