= M551 Sheridan replacement process =

Competition of United States Army

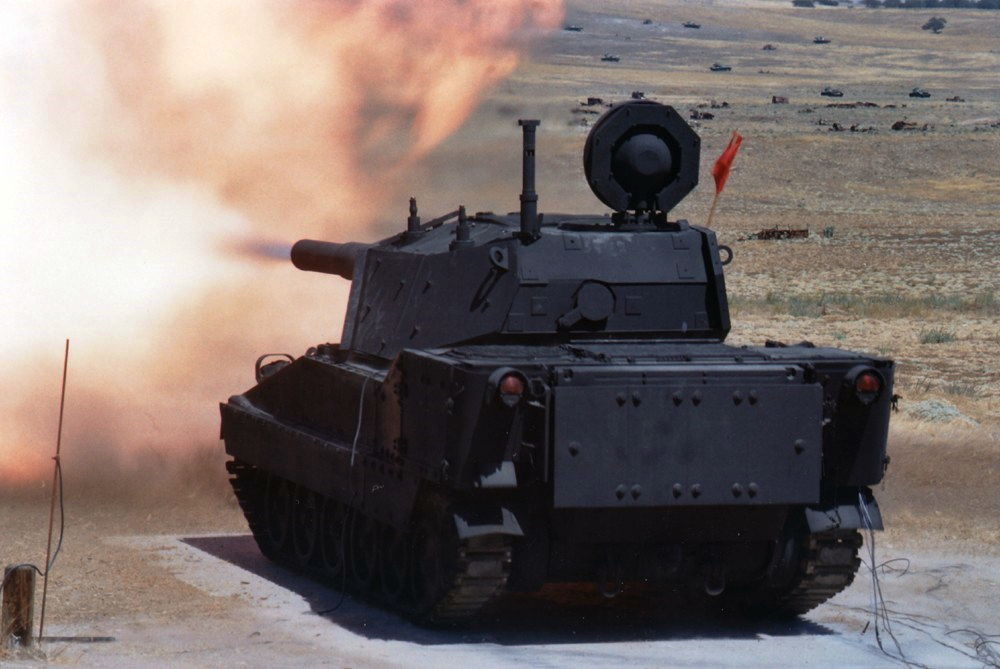
The FMC Close Combat Vehicle-Light ultimately won the AGS contest. Here, an M8 Thunderbolt fires its 120 mm main gun.

The Armored Gun System (AGS) was a U.S. Army competition in the 1990s to design a light tank to replace the M551 Sheridan and TOW-equipped HMMWVs. It was the ultimate incarnation of several research programs run in the 1970s with the aim of providing air-mobile light infantry forces with the firepower needed to last in the battlefield.

There were three primary entries into the AGS contest. Cadillac Gage offered its Stingray light tank with the traditional four-man layout. FMC offered the Close Combat Vehicle Light (CCVL) with a three-man configuration. Teledyne offered its Expeditionary tank which had a two-man layout with an unmanned turret.

In 1992, FMC's design was selected and given the name M8 Armored Gun System. However, purchases of the M8 were cancelled in 1997. The role was ultimately filled by the Stryker M1128 mobile gun system, which was retired in 2022. In 2017, the Army requested proposals for the Mobile Protected Firepower requirement. The Army downselected BAE Systems' variant of the M8 AGS and General Dynamics Land Systems Griffin II. The Army reportedly disqualified BAE's proposal in March 2022. The GDLS Griffin II light tank was selected in June 2022. The initial contract was for 96 vehicles with first delivery by the end of 2023. The first units were expected to be equipped with it by 2026. It was officially designated M10 Booker in June 2023. It was announced on May 2nd, 2025 that the M10 program would be cancelled.

== History ==
=== M551 ===
The need for a new light tank for the US Army was an ongoing concern that stretched into the 1950s. A series of experiments ultimately led to the M551 Sheridan entering service in 1967. The designers of the M551 faced a difficult problem; guns capable of destroying main battle tanks at a reasonable range were too heavy to fit onto a lightweight chassis. The M551 solved this with the M81 gun/launcher, which fired HEAT shells at low velocity for short-range work, and the MGM-51 Shillelagh missile for long-range shots.

In practice the M81 proved to be unreliable, and the guidance system for the missile was a source of continual failures. When tested during the Vietnam War, the missile system was simply not fit for use and the tank was used primarily in the anti-infantry role. Reviews were mixed; it was praised for its mobility and resistance to getting stuck in mud, but was also prone to destruction by mines and RPG-2 rounds that larger tanks would shrug off.

=== ARMVAL ===
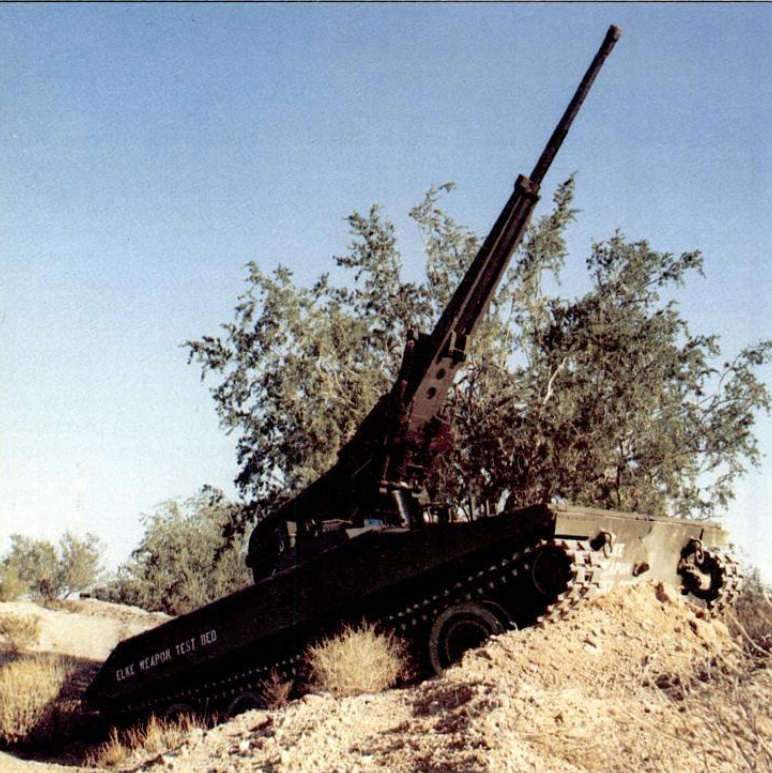
ELKE Weapon Test Bed

By the early 1970s the limitations with the M551 were clear, and in 1976 the Army began the Armored Combat Vehicle Technology program to come up with a design that combined the firepower of a front-line tank while improving its survivability through very small size as opposed to heavy armor. The US Marine Corps were studying similar concepts as part of their efforts to replace the M50 Ontos, itself a former Army program whose rejection led to the M551 program. The two forces combined their efforts in 1978 as the Advanced Antiarmor Vehicle Evaluation (ARMVAL).

One of the first products of the ARMVAL program was a new gun system known as the "over-head gun" or OHG. This consisted of a tank gun mounted on a remote-control turret with the gun itself on a rotating arm. Normally the gun was close to flush with the top of the chassis, but when the tank stopped, the arm could be rotated upward, elevating the gun about a meter (yard) to allow it to be fired while the tank was completely under cover. The original gun was later replaced by the ARES 75 mm smoothbore rapid-fire hyper-velocity gun, and the system was renamed ELKE, for Elevated Kinetic Energy Vehicle. The ARES concept was to fire multiple rounds at a target in order to break down its composite armor.

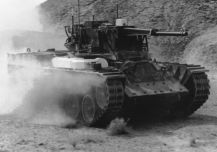
HIMAG undergoing testing in 1980.

The final vehicle of the ARMVAL series was HIMAG, for High Mobility/Agility test vehicle. This combined the ARES gun with a new chassis with more armor. HIMAG was further modified with an eye to allowing the gun to be used in the anti-aircraft role. This version lost the OHG elevation system and replaced it with a somewhat more conventional turret, but had a well in the chassis that the breach could depress into, allowing the gun to elevate to 40 degrees.

=== HSTV/L ===
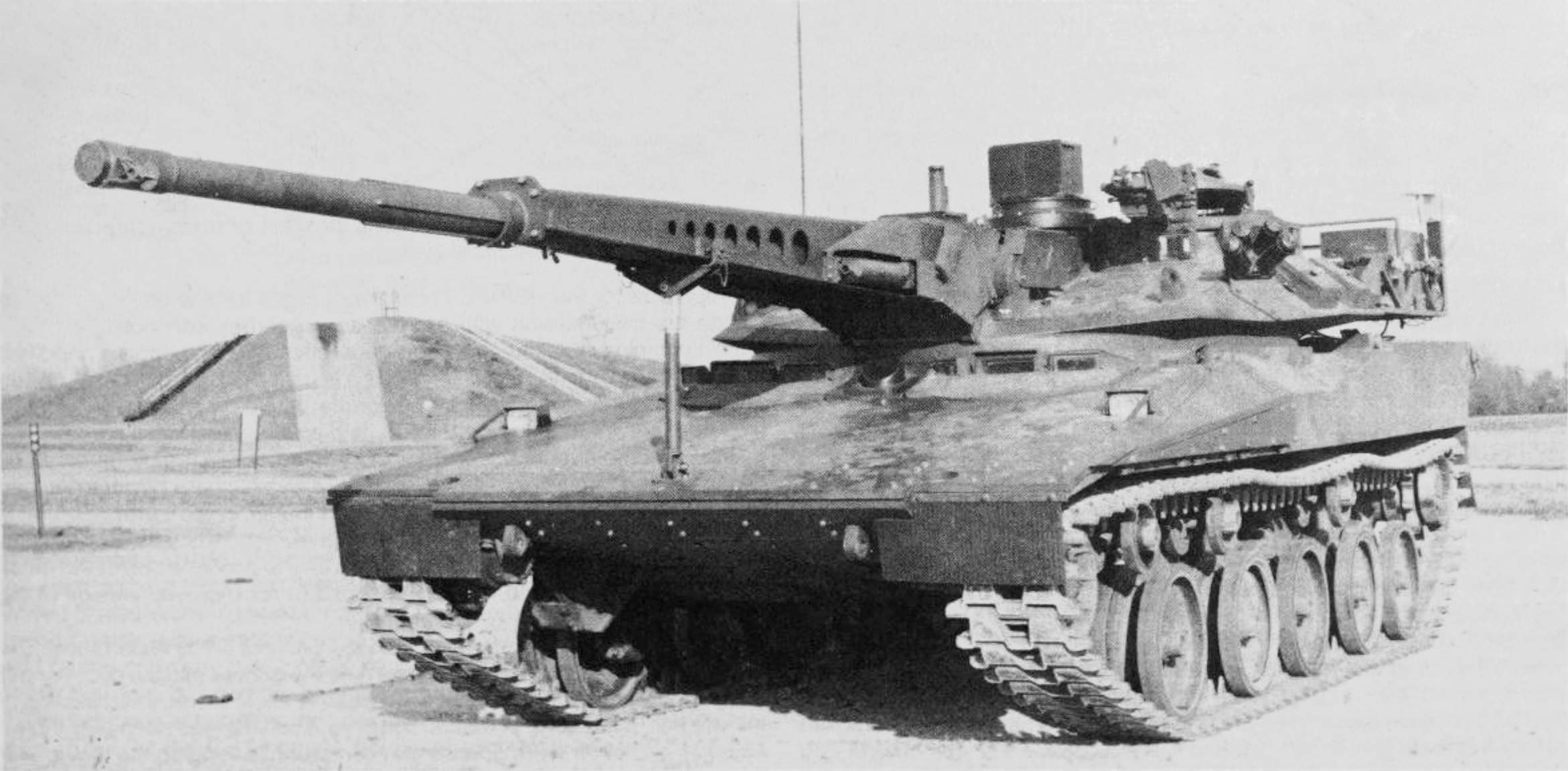
HSTV(L) mockup circa 1981

The HIMAG chassis was further upgraded with armor on the front to allow it to absorb frontal hits and included a newer "hunter/killer sight" and laser rangefinder. In this form, it became the High Survivability Test Vehicle/Light (HSTV/L).

However, by the time the HSTV/L was being tested, the Army concluded that the ARES gun would not be effective against newer Soviet tanks. The Royal Ordnance L7 105 mm gun was now considered the bare minimum, and there were concerns that the gun's recoil would be too much for the lightweight chassis to handle. The Marines were not convinced the ARES would not be effective, especially for their beach-landing role. The Marine Corps continued developing the concept under the name Mobile Protected Weapons System (MPWS) an amphibious ship-to-shore vehicle. The Army joined the Marine Corps effort in 1981, but the two services ultimately ended their collaboration. The Marines continued looking for light weapons systems, including adding the ARES to the LAV-25.

=== XM4 ===
Following the end of the MPGS joint project, the Army initiated the XM4 armored gun system project. In December 1985, Army Vice Chief of Staff Maxwell Thurman called for the Army to purchase 500 AGS systems. The Naval Surface Weapons Center mated a M68 105 mm gun (with the recoil system of the Sheridan) to a Sheridan chassis. Testing of this test bed validated the idea that a light tank could carry a 105 mm gun. For the AGS, the Army sought a commercial off-the-shelf solution for the AGS. Several candidates emerged including the Cadillac Gage Cadillac Gage Stingray, the Teledyne Continental Motors AGS, FCM Corporation's Close Combat Vehicle Light, and Hägglunds IKV-91. Funding for the AGS was curtailed by the Gramm–Rudman–Hollings Balanced Budget Act.

=== RDF and Air Land Battle ===
While the ARMVAL program was ongoing, in 1979 Jimmy Carter ordered the formation of the Rapid Deployment Joint Task Force, or RDF. Until this time the US's focus was almost entirely on a "heavy" war in Europe, but the Vietnam War and a number of events in the early 1970s led to concerns that they were completely unprepared in case war began anywhere else. This point was driven home during the 1979 Iran hostage crisis, when it was realized there was very little the U.S. could do if the Soviets invaded Iran; the first troops could not arrive for weeks at a minimum, and air power in the area was limited to the B-52 Stratofortress flying from bases in the Indian Ocean, Naval air power could not reach the northeastern areas where the Soviets would operate.

The RDF concept, although short-lived in its original form, once again demonstrated the need for a new light tank in order to allow the forces to be airlanded and still be able to last until the heavier forces arrived by ship. In 1982, RDF essentially consisted of the 82nd Airborne and 101st Airborne, still equipped with the M551. The desire to add further power to their mobile forces was the impetus for a sweeping series of changes known as Air Land Battle. This called for a much larger group of light forces to be able to act as a stop-gap in Europe while the heavier forces arrived, as well as be ready for rapid deployment to brushfire wars. The ARMVAL tank, a militarized dune buggy and the new Light Helicopter Experimental helicopter, were required to give these forces the firepower they needed while the main forces arrived.

=== AGS ===
In 1987, Carl E. Vuono was appointed Army Chief of Staff. At around this point, the Army had spent about $30 million on light tank programs to replace the Sheridan. In June 1987, Vuono announced his intention to field a gun system. Around the time, Vuono indicated that the light divisions would require about 700 of the new design by the 1990s.

=== XM8 ===
The Army grew concerned that the initial request for proposals were too stringent. In April 1991 the Army relaxed its requirements, raising the weight limit and removing the requirement that the AGS be air-droppable from a C-130. The Army required that 70 of the 300 vehicles be built to be air-droppable from the larger C-17. A requirement for radiation hardening of electrical systems was also removed. The Army also delayed the initial operating capability by two years, from 1995 to 1997.

In 1991 the Pentagon canceled the Marine Corps' LAV-105 gun system. Funding was however restored by the Senate Armed Services Committee under the stipulation that the services integrate the turret and EX-35 gun of the LAV-105 with the AGS chassis. And work to ensure "maximum practical commonality" between the LAV-105 and AGS. This move garnered consternation among both services who believed that the LAV-105 and heavier armored AGS were mismatched. The Senate Appropriations Committee nixed the LAV-105 turret stipulation, saying the requirement would discourage competitors that could not integrate the turret on their design.

By 1992, with the deferment of the Armored Systems Modernization Block III tank and the Comanche helicopter, the AGS emerged as the top priority procurement program for the Army. The relatively low cost of the program—about $600 million—amid shrinking procurement budgets contributed to the service's good will towards the project.

The request for proposals specified that the AGS be built in two variants. One variant was to be capable of low-velocity air-drop from a C-17, and to weigh no more than 49,500 lb (22,453 kg). The other variant was to have roll-on, roll-off capability from the C-130, C-141, C-17 and C-5. This was to weigh no more than 44,000 lb (19,958 kg) for a tracked vehicle, or 49,500 lb (22,453 kg) for a wheeled submission.

The main gun was to be the 105mm XM35.

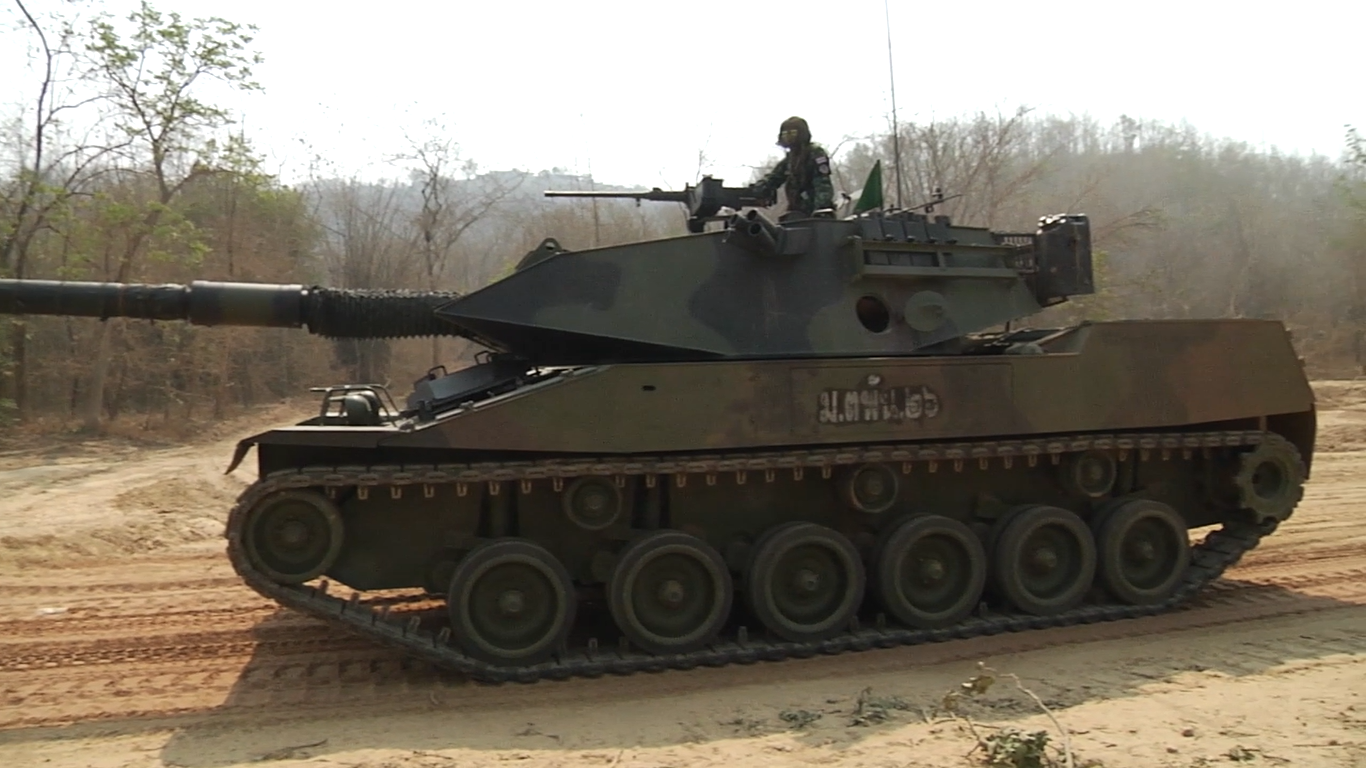
A Stingray light tank of the Royal Thai Army in 2019

In 1992 four teams submitted bids for the AGS.

- Cadillac Gage Textron paired a Commando Stingray chassis to a LAV-105 turret. It had a fairly conventional layout with a four-man crew.
- FMC proposed its Close Combat Vehicle, Light, with a three-man crew and autoloader.
- The General Dynamics Land Systems and Teledyne Continental submitted their Expeditionary tank, which had a crew of two in the hull with a remote-control auto-loaded turret.
- Team Hägglunds USA submitted a variant of the Combat Vehicle 90 with a turret made by GIAT Industries

Although the AGS program was intended to be non-developmental, (i.e. using completely commercial off-the-shelf designs), the Army determined that all four entries would require some modification to meet its requirements. This raised the ire of the House Appropriations defense subcommittee, who voted to de-fund the project. With the support of Senate defense appropriators, the House restored this funding.

In June 1992, the Army selected the FMC proposal. FMC was awarded $27.7 million to begin phase 1 work. The total value of the procurement program was expected to earn FMC about $800 million.

Four evaluation vehicles were built and tested at Fort Bragg, leading to a 1996 low-rate order for the initial production vehicles. Only one year later, Defense Secretary William Perry instructed the Army to reduce manpower by another 20,000 as part of the FY1997 budget. The Army instead suggested reducing weapons programs and other efficiencies. The final budget left the troop count at 495,000, but AGS was one of the victims of the cuts.
