= M992 field artillery ammunition supply vehicle =

American armored tracked logistics

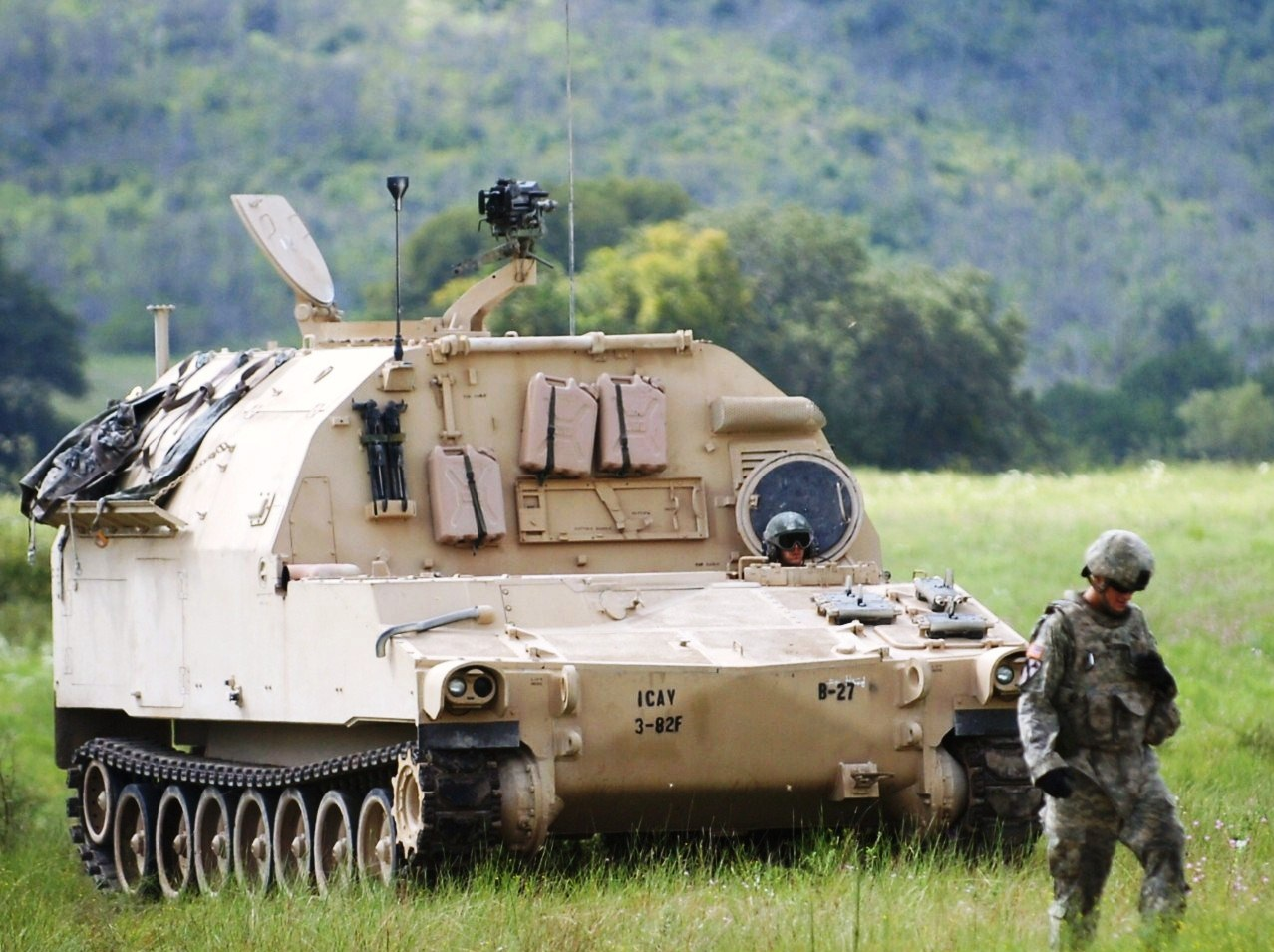
- M992A2 FAASV
- Type: Ammunition resupply vehicle
- Place of origin: United States

Service history
- In service: 1982–present
- Used by: See users

Production history
- Designer: BMY Combat Systems
- Designed: 1979–1982
- Manufacturer: BAE Systems Inc.
- Variants: M992; M992A1; M992A2; M992A3; M1050

Specifications (M992A2 FAASV)
- Mass: 28.8 short tons (26.1 t)
- Length: 21 ft 8 in (6.6 m)
- Width: 10 ft 4 in (3.15 m)
- Height: 10 ft 9 in (3.28 m)
- Crew: 4
- Armor: 5083 aluminium alloy
- Main armament: .50 BMG (12.7 mm) M2 HB MG
- Engine: Detroit Diesel 8V-71T LHR, 9.3 litre, 8 cylinder, turbocharged, 2 stroke diesel 440 hp (330 kW) at 2,350 rpm
- Payload capacity: 95 x 155 mm projectiles, charges and fuzes
- Drive: Tracked
- Transmission: Allison Transmission XTG-411-4 crossdrive, 4 forward, 2 reverse
- Suspension: Torsion bar
- Fuel capacity: 135 US gal (511 L)
- Operational range: 220 mi (354 km)
- Maximum speed: 40 mph (64 km/h)
- References: Janes

The M992 field artillery ammunition supply vehicle (FAASV) is built on the chassis of the M109 howitzer. It is also colloquially referred to as a "cat" (referring to its nomenclature, CAT: Carrier, Ammunition, Tracked). It replaced the M548 supply vehicle. Unlike the M548, it is armored.

== Design ==
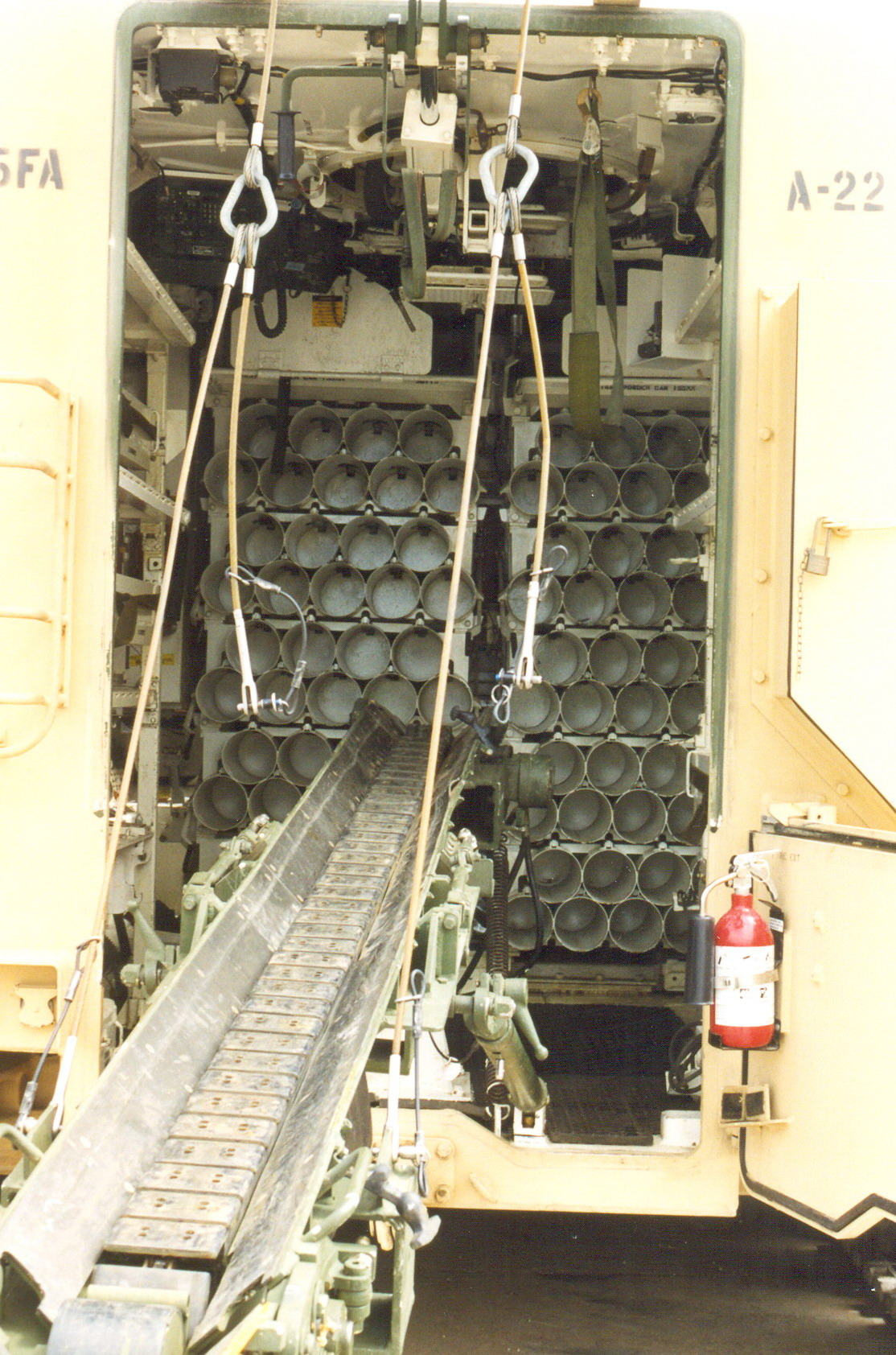
Inside the M992 as viewed from the rear as well as its loader

This ammunition vehicle has no turret, but has a taller superstructure to store 90-95 rounds (depending on the model) with a corresponding number of powders and primers. For the M992 and M992A1 there is a maximum of 90 conventional rounds, 45 each in two racks, and three M712 Copperhead rounds. Until recently, much of the remaining internal crew space was taken up by a hydraulically-powered conveyor system designed to allow the quick uploading of rounds or their transfer to the M109-series howitzer.

Most early models had an additional mechanism called an X-Y Conveyor to lift the rounds into the honeycomb-like storage racks in the front of the superstructure. A ceiling plate above the two racks can be unbolted and opened to allow the racks to be winched out of the vehicle. This vehicle is fitted with a Halon fire suppression system and a weapons mount similar to that on the M109 turret, usually mounting a Mk 19 grenade launcher for local defense against infantry and light armored vehicles. The latest models have a mounting point for two secure radios.

The hydraulic conveyor system is usually removed by crews, as it is slower than moving the rounds by hand. Recently, the army has removed the conveyor system and changed the two horizontal opening doors to two vertical doors opening from the center to provide protection to the crew during transfers.

The vehicle also contains a two-stroke diesel-powered auxiliary power unit that can power all non-automotive energy requirements on the Field Artillery Ammunition Supply Vehicle and on the howitzer when a slave cable is used to connect the two. This reduces fuel consumption when mobility is not required.

Between December 1995 to December 1996, Samsung Aerospace Industries upgraded the M992s used by United States Forces Korea, including the increase of engine horsepower from 400 to 440.

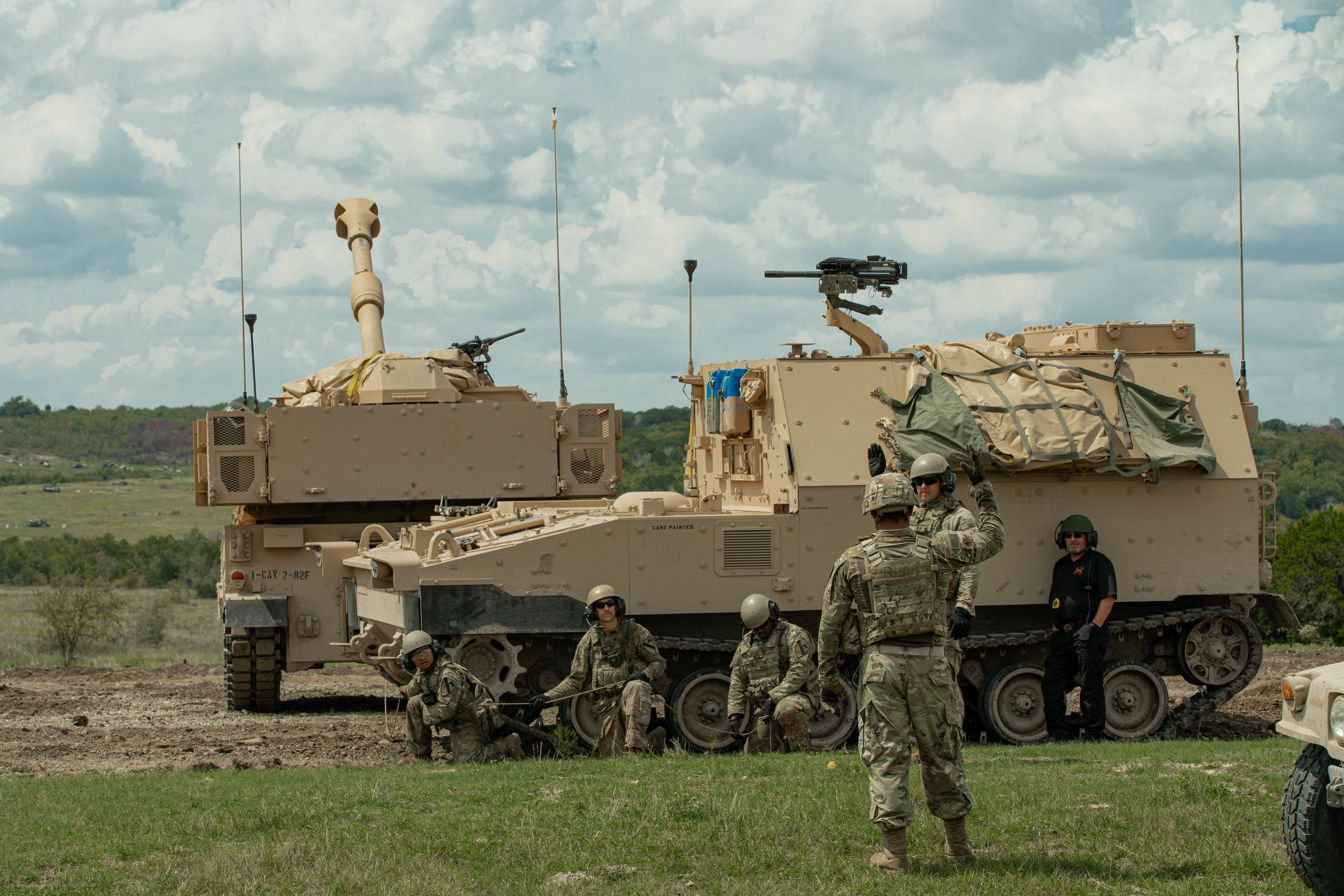
M992A3 Field Artillery Ammunition Support Vehicle

== Users ==
- Brazil - 40 (former U.S. Army)
- Chile - 48 (former Swiss, upgraded by RUAG and FAMAE.)
- Egypt - 275
- Greece
- Indonesia - 4 M992A2 (former Belgian Army)
- Lebanon
- Morocco - 85 in 2016
- Spain
- Switzerland
- Taiwan
- Thailand
- United States - 231 M992A3
- Ukraine

== See also ==
Related development

- M109 howitzer

Vehicle of comparable role and configuration

- K10 ammunition resupply vehicle
