= Ares, Inc. =

Firearms manufacturing company

Ares Incorporated
- Type: Private
- Industry: Arms industry
- Founded: 1971
- Founder: Eugene Stoner; Robert Bihun
- Headquarters: 818 Front St. Lake Erie Business Park, Port Clinton, Ohio, United States
- Products: Autocannons, turrets, firearms, autoloaders, barrels, ammunition

Ares Incorporated is an American weapons manufacturer and firearms engineering company co-founded by the American weapons inventor and developer Eugene Stoner in 1971. The company is based near Port Clinton, Ohio, and produces fire control systems, turret systems, small arms, automatic cannons and industrial machinery. Mr. Stoner left the company in 1989, joining Knight's Armament Company in 1990, where his designs included the Stoner 96, a further refinement of the Ares LMG/Stoner 63.

== Products ==
Ares has a history of weapon systems, weapons, and accessories including:

- 1973–1978: Ares FARC (Future Assault Rifle Concept)
- 1974–1984: 35mm Eagle Air Defense System, 35mm autocannon, 35mm CVAST Turret System
- 1975–1988: 75mm XM274 Medium Caliber anti-armor automatic cannon and the XM21 Loader
- 1980–1982: 90mm Medium Caliber anti-armor automatic cannons
- 1985–1986: Ares FMG (Folding Machine Gun, designed by Francis Warin)
- 1984–1988: .50 caliber PCTA (Plastic Cased Telescoped Ammunition), 33% lighter than M33 cartridge
- 1984–1987: 20mm CTA 6-barrel Gatling Gun
- 1985–1989: .50 caliber TAMG (Telescoped Ammunition Machine Gun, 40% lighter than the M2 HBMG
- 1985–1988: Innovative Recoil Mechanism, real time recoil control measuring recoil position and velocity
- 1985–1998: The Automatic Loader and 9-round Carousel Magazine for the AGS Advanced Gun System
- 1986–1993: Ares LMG (Light Machine Gun, a.k.a. the “Stoner 86”, a refined version of the Stoner 63)
- 1986–1989: AIWS (Advanced Individual Weapon System)
- 1986–1994: 45mm XM295 COMVAT (COMbat Vehicles Armament Technology) automatic cannon and autoloader using CT ammunition developed by Orbital-ATK
- 1987–1990: .50 caliber TARG (Telescoped Ammunition Revolver Gun a lightweight gun for aircraft applications
- 1997–1999: The automatic loader and 8-round carousel magazine for the Stryker 105 mm MGS
- 1997–2003: The recoil mechanism for the Stryker 105 mm MGS
- 2003–present: Sole source supplier for new and refurbished recoil mechanisms for the Stryker 105mm MGS
- 2001–2003: Validated the US Army Benet Laboratories' RAVEN (RArefaction WaVE Gun) concept with the 35mm Demonstrator and the Ares designed and manufactured firing mount
- 2004–2011: LSAT (Lightweight Small Arms Technologies), in cooperation with AAI Corporation) that included, 5.56mm CT Spiral 1 ammunition design, 5.56 mm LMG weapon action, 5.56 mm carbine
- 2006–2013: Test and refinement of US Army Benet Laboratories' 105mm RAVEN Demonstrator and the Ares designed and manufactured firing mount
- 2008–2013: Designed, manufactured, and tested the Medium caliber 45mm RAVEN Demonstrator and firing mount
- 2005–present: 7.62mm EPG (Externally Powered Gun) designed by Gene Stoner in the early 1970s; updated and developed for today's remote weapon stations
- 2007–present: Developing manufacturing technology to rifle barrels with an explosively bonded Tantalum-Tungsten liner
- 2014–present: Design the intermediate caliber CT carbine
- Small, medium, and large caliber Mann barrels and launchers

== Services ==
- Complete firing test range encompassing over 650 acres
- Interior and exterior ballistic instrumentation
- Indoor and outdoor firing ranges
- Small arms to 155mm artillery weapons
- Gun barrel design and manufacturing
- Experimental and one-of-a-kind gun barrels
- Weapon Systems, weapons, and component design and manufacturing
- Laser bore measuring medium caliber gun barrels

== Notes and sources ==
- Business Development Department, Ares, Inc.
- Ares, Inc. Company Brochure
- Ares, Inc. Gun Barrel Capabilities Brochure
- Ares Inc. listing at MacRaes Blue Book
- Stoner interview from the Smithsonian Institution Archives
- Watters, Daniel (2000–2005). "The 5.56 x 45mm: 1967–1973". TheGunZone.com. Archived from the original on 18 February 2007.
  - The 5.56 x 45mm: 1974–1985, 1986–1994, 1995–1999, 2000–2003, 2004–Present
