= Bore evacuator =

Device in armored fighting vehicles

Animated sequence of how a bore evacuator works.

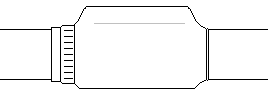
A bore evacuator.

A bore evacuator or fume extractor is a device which removes lingering gases and airborne residues from the barrel of an armored fighting vehicle's gun after firing, particularly in tanks and self-propelled guns. By creating a pressure differential in the barrel after the shell leaves, the bore evacuator causes most of the propellant gases and combustion residues to exit via the muzzle. Thus, when the breech opens for reloading, those gases and residues do not escape into the crew compartment and pose a hazard to the gun crew.

== Description ==
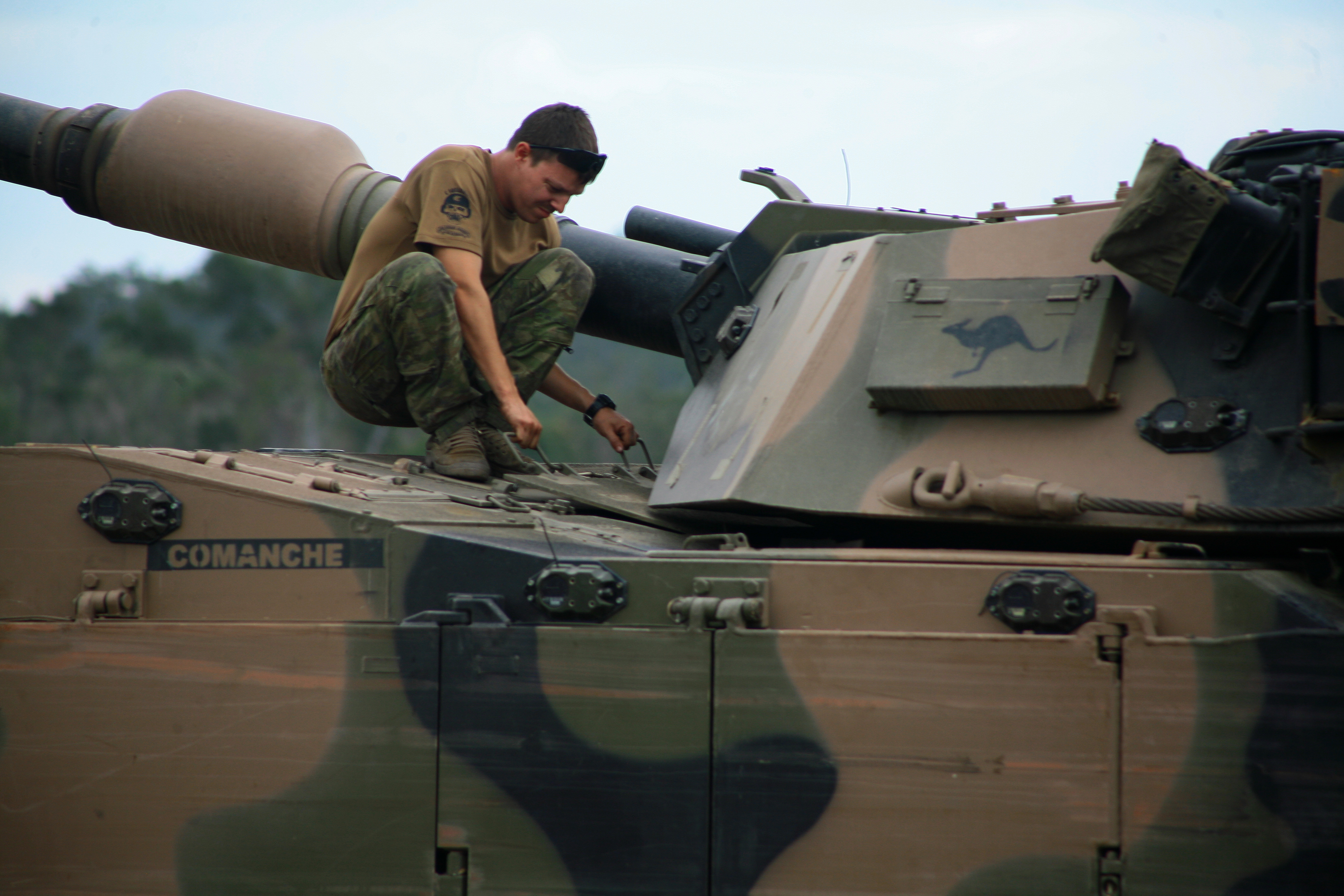
Bore evacuator on an M1 Abrams

The evacuator is a passive device generally consisting of a ring of holes drilled into the barrel, surrounded by a cylindrical pressure reservoir that is sealed to the barrel's surface. When the gun is fired, high pressure gas generated by the burning propellant pushes the projectile forward. When the projectile passes the holes drilled into the barrel the propellant gasses are free to flow into the reservoir. When the projectile leaves the gun the pressure in the barrel drops and the gas stored in the reservoir flows back into the barrel. By aiming these holes forward, this flow gives the propellant gasses in the barrel enough forward momentum to draw them out of the barrel.

Various designs attempt to improve on the basic concept in a number of ways. One common change is to use two sets of holes, each designed specifically to be efficient at capturing or releasing the gas. In this case the forward set of holes is similar to the single-hole example, but a second rearward set of holes is added, using check valves (typically ball bearings in a pit) to allow the high-pressure gases in, but not out again. The system may be arranged to allow the gases to escape through the forward set of holes before the shell reaches it, causing a partial vacuum to develop directly behind the shell, aiding extraction.

For best results, the breech must be opened at the proper time, just as the forward momentum of the gases reaches its maximum, the peak flow. This means that bore extractors are normally used only on guns with semi-automatic or fully automatic actions, where the breech is opened and the shell ejected as part of the recoil process.

Evacuators reduce the chances of explosive propellant gases flowing backward into the turret, causing combustion as they mingle with oxygen, though this can still happen if the evacuator is poorly designed, poorly maintained, or damaged. Unprotected bore evacuators damaged by bullets have caused considerable problems in past conflicts, but up-armoring solved this problem.

Bore evacuators are a common feature on most modern tanks and some self-propelled guns. The French Leclerc tank is a counterexample; it instead uses overpressure from an internal compartment to force gases outward.
