= Next Generation Combat Vehicle =

Program of United States Army

The Next Generation Combat Vehicle (NGCV) is a United States Army program intended to procure a variety of armored vehicles to add new capabilities to Army units and replace existing platforms that are nearing the end of their service life. The program covers the following systems:

- Armored Multi-Purpose Vehicle (AMPV), the replacement for the M113.
- XM30 Mechanized Infantry Combat Vehicle (MICV), the replacement for the M2 Bradley IFV, formerly known as the Optionally Manned Fighting Vehicle (OMFV)
- Mobile Protected Firepower (MPF), fire support vehicle for Infantry Brigade Combat Teams (IBCTs), that resulted in the currently abandoned M10 Booker.
- Robotic Combat Vehicle (RCV), three unmanned ground vehicles in light, medium, and heavy configurations.
- Decisive Lethality Platform (DLP), the replacement for the M1 Abrams main battle tank.

== Development ==
The project began in 2017 after the previous Ground Combat Vehicle program was canceled. The deadline of the projects is expected to be 2035. Multiple groups competed for the bid. The Army gave the contract to a six member consortium - Lockheed Martin, SAIC, GS Engineering, Inc., Moog Inc., Hodges Transportation Inc. and Roush Industries.

== Armored Multi-Purpose Vehicle ==
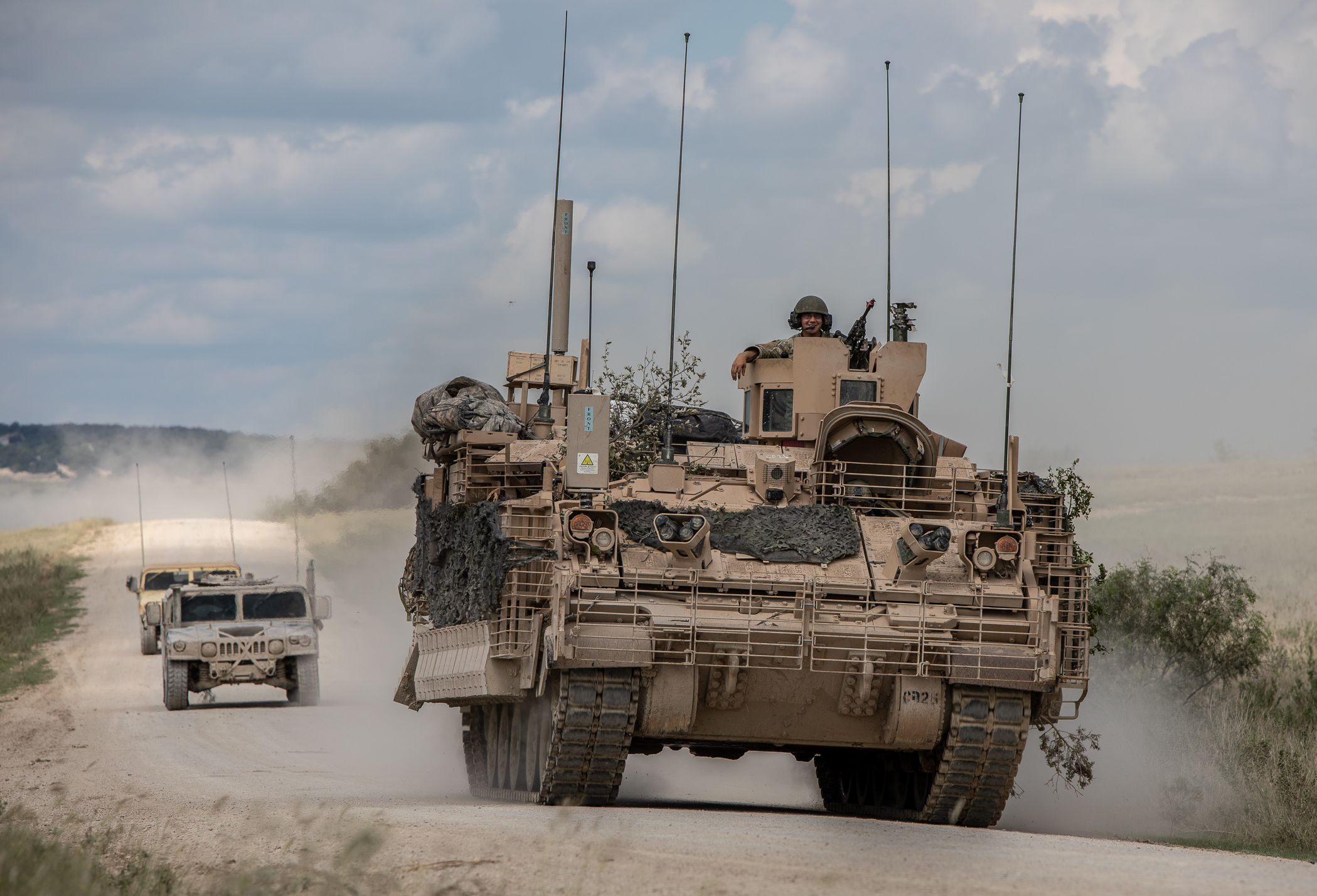
Soldiers from 4th Squadron (Dark Horse), 9th Cavalry Regiment, 2nd Armored Brigade Combat Team, 1st Cavalry Division, complete field testing of the Armored Multi-Purpose Vehicle at Fort Hood, Texas, circa 2018

The Armored Multi-Purpose Vehicle (AMPV) is the replacement for the M113. In 2014, the Army selected BAE Systems' proposal of a turretless variant of the Bradley Fighting Vehicle. As of 2015 the program was scheduled to deliver 2,897 AMPVs in five variants.

== Mobile Protected Firepower ==
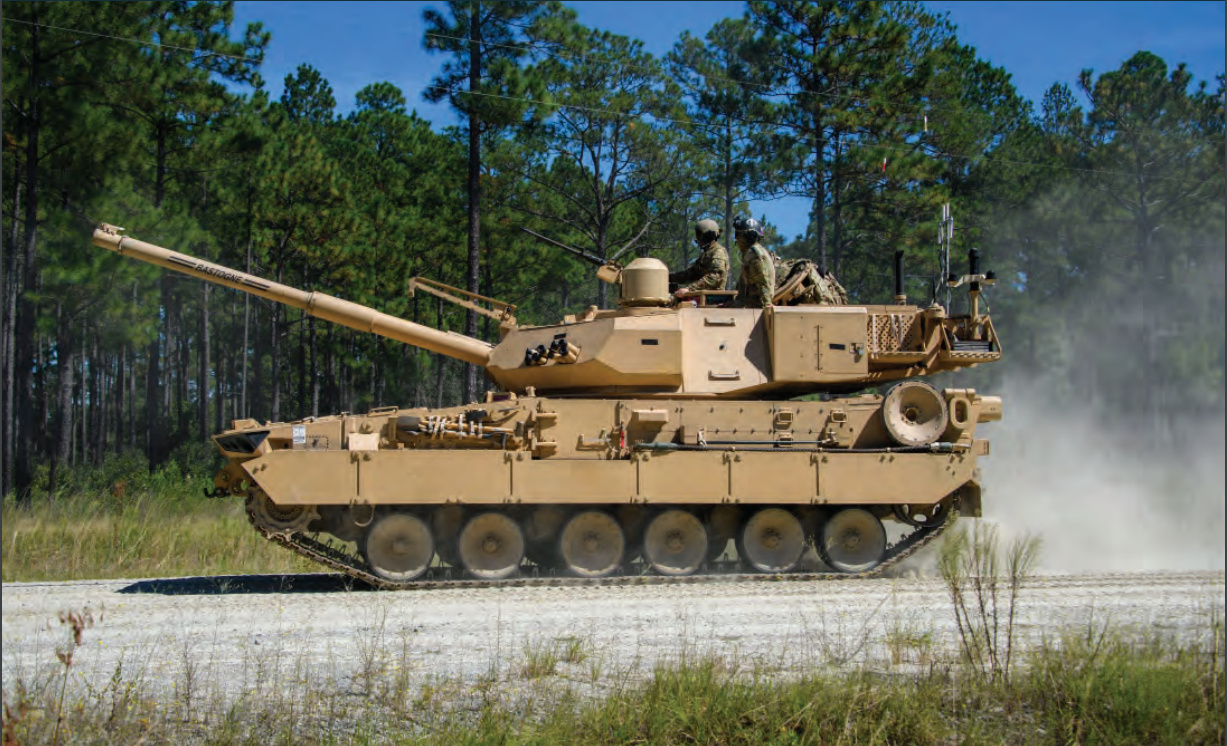
Mobile Protected Firepower, based on the General Dynamics Griffin

Mobile Protected Firepower is a fire support vehicle. It is similar to the M8 Armored Gun System program canceled in 1996, or the M1128 mobile gun system being retired in 2022.

In November 2019, the Army released a request for proposals for the Mobile Protected Firepower.

In December 2018, the Army downselected BAE Systems' and General Dynamics Land Systems' proposals to move forward.

BAE offered a vehicle based on the M8 Armored Gun System. GDLS offered a variant of the Griffin II.

On June 28, 2022, the Army selected the GDLS Griffin II light tank as the winner of the MPF program, with an initial contract for 96 vehicles.

In June 2023, the Army designated the Mobile Protected Firepower combat vehicle as the M10 Booker after Private Robert D. Booker, who was killed in the North African campaign during World War II, and Staff Sergeant Stevon Booker, who was a tank commander during the Battle of Baghdad.

On 2 May 2025 the M10 program was cancelled. Army Secretary Dan Driscoll stated the program's cancellation was due to cost, a poorly negotiated right to repair maintenance contract, a 42 ton weight, and the design. The Army had taken delivery of approximately 80 of the vehicles when the program was cancelled. The vehicles have an uncertain future and may be transferred to armored units, sold abroad, or placed in storage, marking the project a failure (for now).

== XM30 Mechanized Infantry Combat Vehicle ==
The XM30 Mechanized Infantry Combat Vehicle (MICV), formerly known as the Optionally Manned Fighting Vehicle (OMFV) is the Army's replacement for the M2 Bradley.

In June 2018, the Army established the Next Generation Combat Vehicle (NGCV) program to replace the M2 Bradley. In October 2018, the program was re-designated as the Optionally Manned Fighting Vehicle (OMFV). The NGCV program was expanded as a portfolio of next-generation vehicles including tanks and the Bradley-based Armored Multi-Purpose Vehicle.

In March 2019, the Army released a request for proposals for the OMFV.

The Army said the OMFV will be designed "to engage in close combat and deliver decisive lethality during the execution of combined arms maneuver," and will have a 30mm cannon and a second-generation forward looking infrared system, or FLIR. Testing of the vehicle is expected to begin in 2020.

A joint venture between Raytheon and Rheinmetall offered a variant of the Lynx KF41. General Dynamics Land Systems offered a variant of the Griffin III. Both Raytheon-Rheinmetall and GDLS were disqualified, leaving no other competitors. The Army decided to restart the program with less-stringent guidelines.

In July 2021, the Army awarded contracts to five teams: Point Blank Enterprises, Oshkosh Defense, BAE Systems, General Dynamics Land Systems and American Rheinmetall Vehicles. The total value of the contract was $299.4 million. Teams will develop concept designs during the 15-month long phase.

In June 2023, the Army downselected American Rheinmetall and GDLS to go forward in the competition. These two teams will now move on to the next phase of the program and split a $1.6 billion development fund to develop a total of eleven prototypes each, seven being for a contract award, with an option for four more. They will also develop two ballistic hulls, turrets, armor coupons, and digital model twins during this phase of the program. The Army announced that due to the initial design stage of the OMFV being complete, that they would be redesignating the programme as the XM30 Mechanized Infantry Combat Vehicle.

== Robotic Combat Vehicle ==
As of December 2021, Robotic Combat Vehicle (RCV) is not a Program of Record, meaning the Army has not committed to an acquisition plan.

The RCV is being developed in light, medium and heavy variants. The RCV-Light weighs no more than 10 tons, the RCV-Medium weighs between 10 and 20 tons, and the RCV-H weighs more than 20 and less than 30 tons.

In January 2020, the Army awarded contracts to Qinetiq and Textron. Qinetiq will build four RCV-Ls, and Textron will build four RCV-Ms.

== Decisive Lethality Platform ==
The decisive lethality platform (DLP) is the planned replacement for the current US Army MBT, the Abrams. Little is known about its design, although the army is currently seriously considering unmanned options with the hope that they would be cheaper to produce, although concerns have been raised on whether an entirely new design would be cheaper, as it could possibly be significantly more expensive.

Possible contenders for the DLP include the M1E3 Abrams, which would be an extensively upgraded version of the Abrams with several new parts and components. According to a 2019 Army Science Board study, the tank would need to include several new key features, such as a new hybrid-electric drivetrain, an autoloader, the capability to field advanced munitions, which could include maneuvering hypersonic rounds or tank-launched ATGMs, improved armor protection against drones and modern guided munitions, reduced thermal and electromagnetic signatures, and the ability to operate alongside and in cooperation with robotic combat vehicles. The hybrid-electric drivetrain is of key concern; one of the project's main goals is to have a better fuel economy than current Abrams models. Currently, General Dynamics has been selected to lead the project's design, although questions remain on whether it will be available for U.S. allies.

== See also ==
- Ground Combat Vehicle, a U.S. Army infantry fighting vehicle program canceled in 2014
- Future Combat Systems Manned Ground Vehicles, an American family of tracked vehicles that was canceled in 2009
- Interim Armored Vehicle, a U.S. Army combat vehicle acquisition program that resulted in the Stryker
- Armored Systems Modernization, a wide-ranging U.S. Army combat vehicle acquisition program cancelled after the end of the Cold War
- M1299, U.S. Army replacement for the M109 howitzer. The program was cancelled in 2024.
