= Mobile Protected Firepower =

Program of United States Army

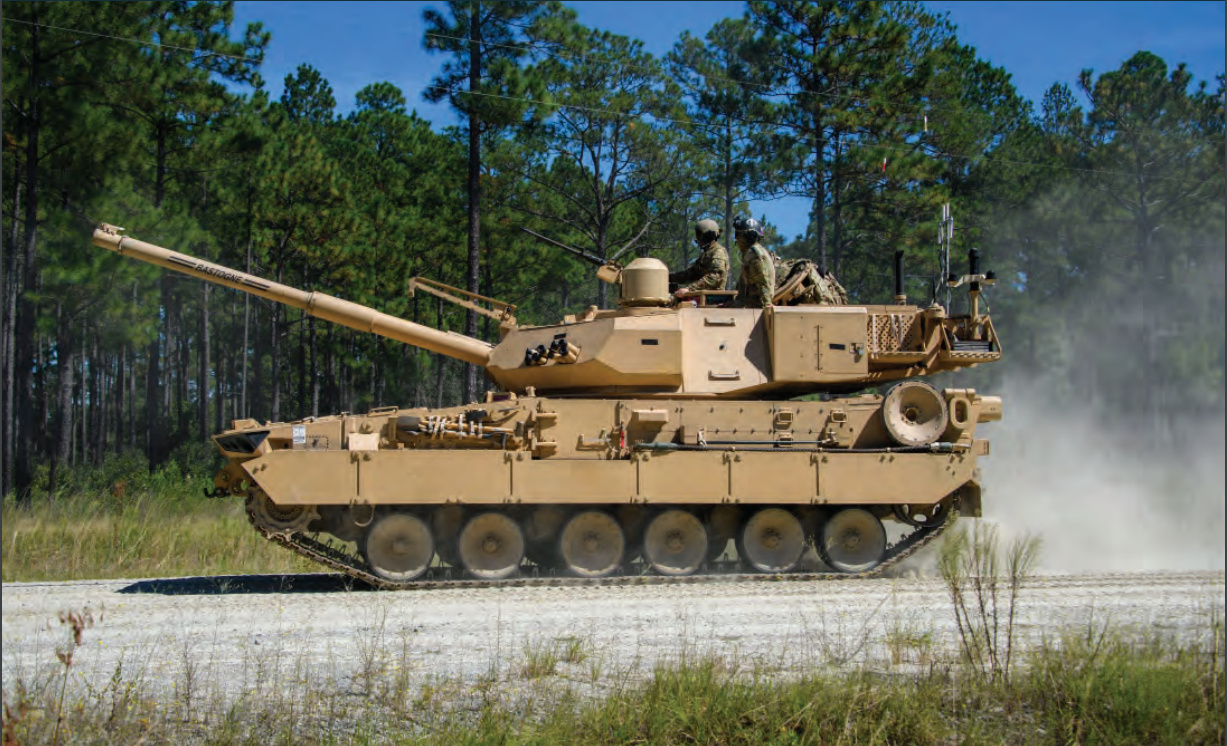
Mobile Protected Firepower, based on the General Dynamics Griffin

Mobile Protected Firepower (MPF) was a U.S. Army program to procure a combat vehicle that is capable of providing mobile, protected, direct fire offensive capability. The projected vehicle has been designated the M10 Booker, and would have essentially served the role of an assault gun. The program was part of the Next Generation Combat Vehicle program.

The MPF vehicle has been called a light tank by some sources, which is incorrect according to some Army officials. It will weigh about 42 tonnes (41 long tons; 46 short tons). MPF is similar in purpose to the M8 Armored Gun System light tank, the intended replacement for the M551 Sheridan, which the Army canceled due to budget considerations in 1996. The last user of M551 Sheridans, the 3/73rd Armor of the 82nd Airborne Division, was subsequently inactivated starting in 1996.

In 2018, the Army selected bids from General Dynamics Land Systems (GDLS) and BAE Systems—for further evaluation for the MPF requirement. Prototypes of GDLS's Griffin II and BAE's M8 AGS were delivered to the Army beginning in 2020. BAE's submission was disqualified in 2022. The Army selected the GDLS model for initial production later that year. In 2023, the Army type classified the vehicle as the M10 Booker. The Army expected to purchase 504 units.

The Defense Department announced in May 2025 that the M10 program was being cancelled.

== History ==
=== Background ===
The Army recognized the poor performance of the M551 Sheridan light tank in Vietnam and began the process of retiring the vehicle in 1977. A small number were retained in active service by the 82nd Airborne Division and the National Guard. (Note: By 1985, the Army had about 800 Sheridans, 750 of which were in storage. The 82nd Airborne retained 50 in active service.)

The Army began a series of projects in the 1980s to either improve the Sheridan or replace it. Some of its efforts around this time could be described as hopelessly intermingled. After a series of false starts, in June 1992 the Army selected FMC's XM8 Armored Gun System (AGS) to go into low-rate initial production. The AGS was expected to replace the Sheridan in the 3/73rd Armor of the 82nd Airborne Division and TOW missile-armed Humvees in the 2nd Armored Cavalry Regiment. The Army canceled the AGS in 1996, citing an unfavorable outyear funding environment.

The 3/73rd Armor was inactivated over the following two years. The last Sheridans in service were vismod Sheridans used for opposing force training. These too were retired in 2004.

In 1999, Army Chief of Staff Eric Shinseki laid out his vision for a lighter, more transportable force. The Army began the Interim Armored Vehicle (IAV) program to implement Shinseki's concept. United Defense LP entered a variant of the AGS to meet the Mobile Gun System requirement; however the Army selected the General Dynamics Land Systems 8×8 LAV III derivative.

=== Design requirements ===
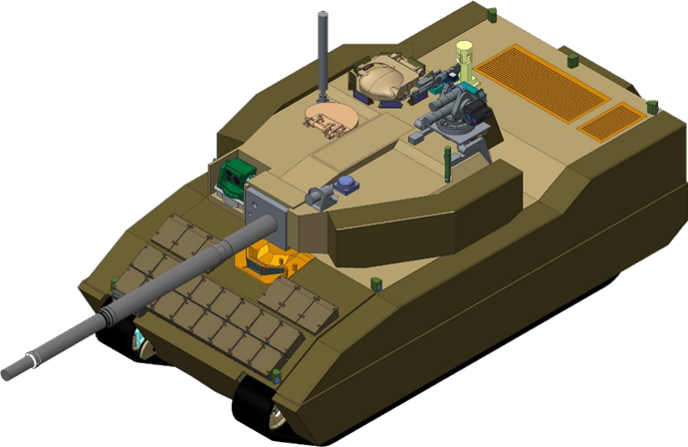
Mobile Protected Firepower notional illustration

The Army stated in its request for proposals in 2015 that it expected the MPF to operate in concert with the Army Ground Mobility Vehicle and Light Reconnaissance Vehicle. The Army said the MPF will operate in "austere and unpredictable locations". At an industry day in August 2016, an Army spokesperson said the MPF was one of the Army's top priorities. The Army desired a commercial off-the-shelf vehicle weighing no more than 32 tonnes (31 long tons; 35 short tons).

The Army opted not to add a requirement for an air-drop capability, unlike the M8 Armored Gun System, which had this capability. According to an Army Futures Command official, as of 2021, one of the two competing team's bids was potentially light enough to airdrop due to its "significantly" lighter weight.

=== Competition ===
In November 2017, the Army issued a request for proposal (RFP) for the Engineering and Manufacturing Development (EMD) phase and, in order to maximize competition, planned to award up to two Middle Tier Acquisition (MTA) contracts for the EMD phase in early 2019. The expected buy was 504 MPF systems.

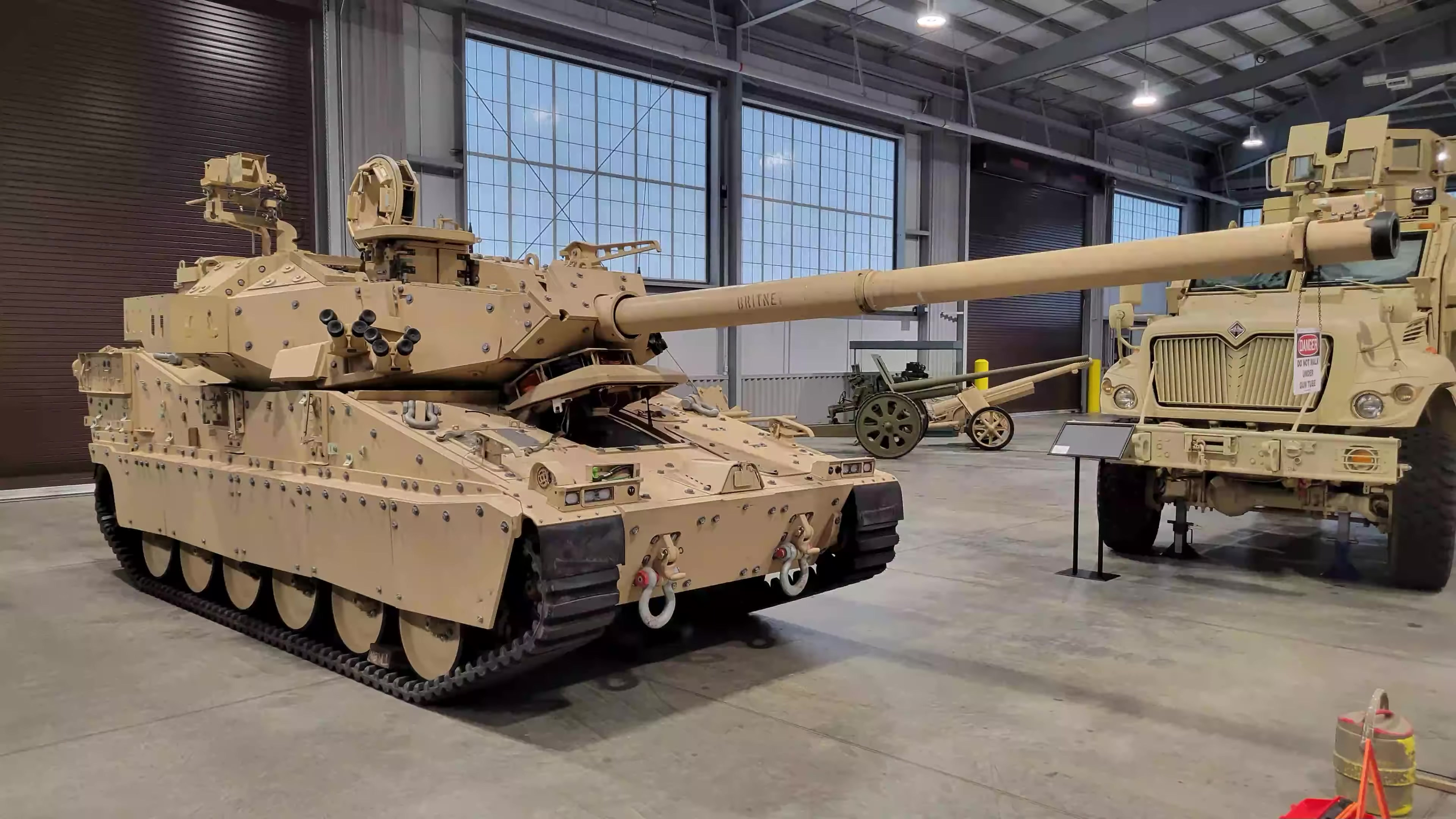
A BAE Systems Mobile Protected Firepower testbed based on the M8 Armored Gun System preserved at the U.S. Army Armor & Cavalry Collection, Fort Benning c. 2023

Science Applications International Corporation partnered with ST Kinetics and CMI Defence. The design paired CMI's Cockerill 305 turret to an ST Kinetics Next Generation Armored Fighting Vehicle hull. BAE Systems offered a vehicle based on the M8 Armored Gun System. General Dynamics Land Systems offered a variant of the Griffin II.

The GDLS vehicle incorporates components and systems from the British Ajax IFV (itself based on the Austrian–Spanish ASCOD). It was publicly unveiled on 22 April 2020. BAE Systems' proposal was a lighter updated version of the M8 Armored Gun System, which was canceled in 1996.

In December 2018, the Army narrowed their choices to BAE and GDLS's proposals to move forward. The Army awarded rapid prototyping contracts for MPF not to exceed $376 million to these two companies.

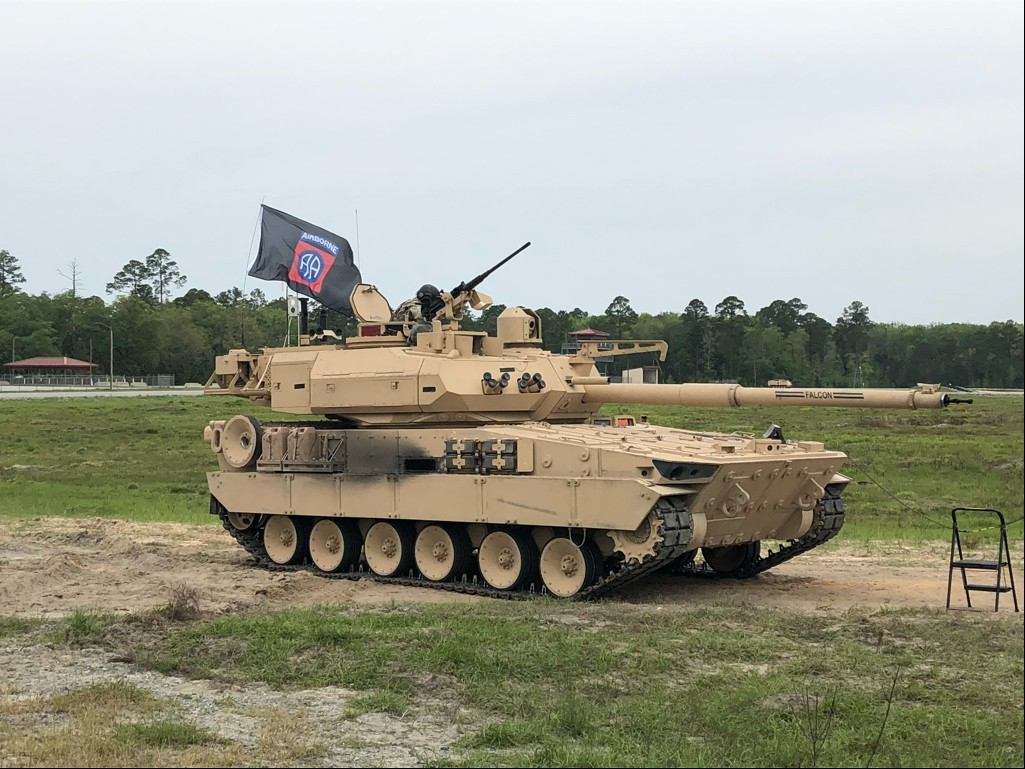
GDLS MPF vehicle c.2022

Both companies faced production difficulties and supplier issues related to the COVID-19 pandemic. The Army had required that the two companies submit all of their 12 prototypes by August 2020. GDLS delivered all of its prototypes (based on the Griffin II) by December 2020. BAE's final prototypes were delivered in February 2021. The assessment phase began in January 2021 at Fort Bragg, North Carolina, with testing scheduled to run through June 2021. In March 2022, BAE was reportedly disqualified from the competition due to "noncompliance issues", leaving GDLS as the only remaining option.

The Army selected the GDLS Griffin II in June 2022. The initial contract is for 96 Low-Rate Initial Production (LRIP) vehicles, with first delivery by the end of 2023.

== Production and cancellation ==
As of January 2023, delivery of the first LRIP MPF system is expected in 19 months, and Initial Operational Testing and Evaluation (IOT & E) is planned for the end of FY2024. The First Unit Equipped (FUE) is scheduled for the fourth quarter of FY2025, consisting of a battalion of 42 MPFs. Each LRIP MPF system is expected to cost about $12.8 million. Full-rate production MPF systems are expected to cost less than LRIP units.

The Army's MPF acquisition objective is for 504 vehicles, with Army officials noting that this number could vary slightly. Each Infantry Brigade Combat Team (IBCT) will be allocated 14 MPFs. The MPFs will form a divisional level battalion, from which companies will be detailed to the IBCTs. The targeted fielding for the first unit equipped is FY2025. Under current Army plans, four MPF battalions are to be fielded by 2030, with the bulk of the planned acquisition scheduled to be completed by 2035.

In June 2023, the Army designated the Mobile Protected Firepower combat vehicle as the M10 Booker after Private Robert D. Booker, who was killed in the North African campaign during World War II, and Staff Sergeant Stevon Booker, who was a tank commander during the invasion of Baghdad.

The Defense Department announced in early May 2025 that the M10 program was being cancelled. Army Secretary Dan Driscoll indicated the vehicle had weight as well as design issues, making it too heavy for many intended missions.

== Design features ==
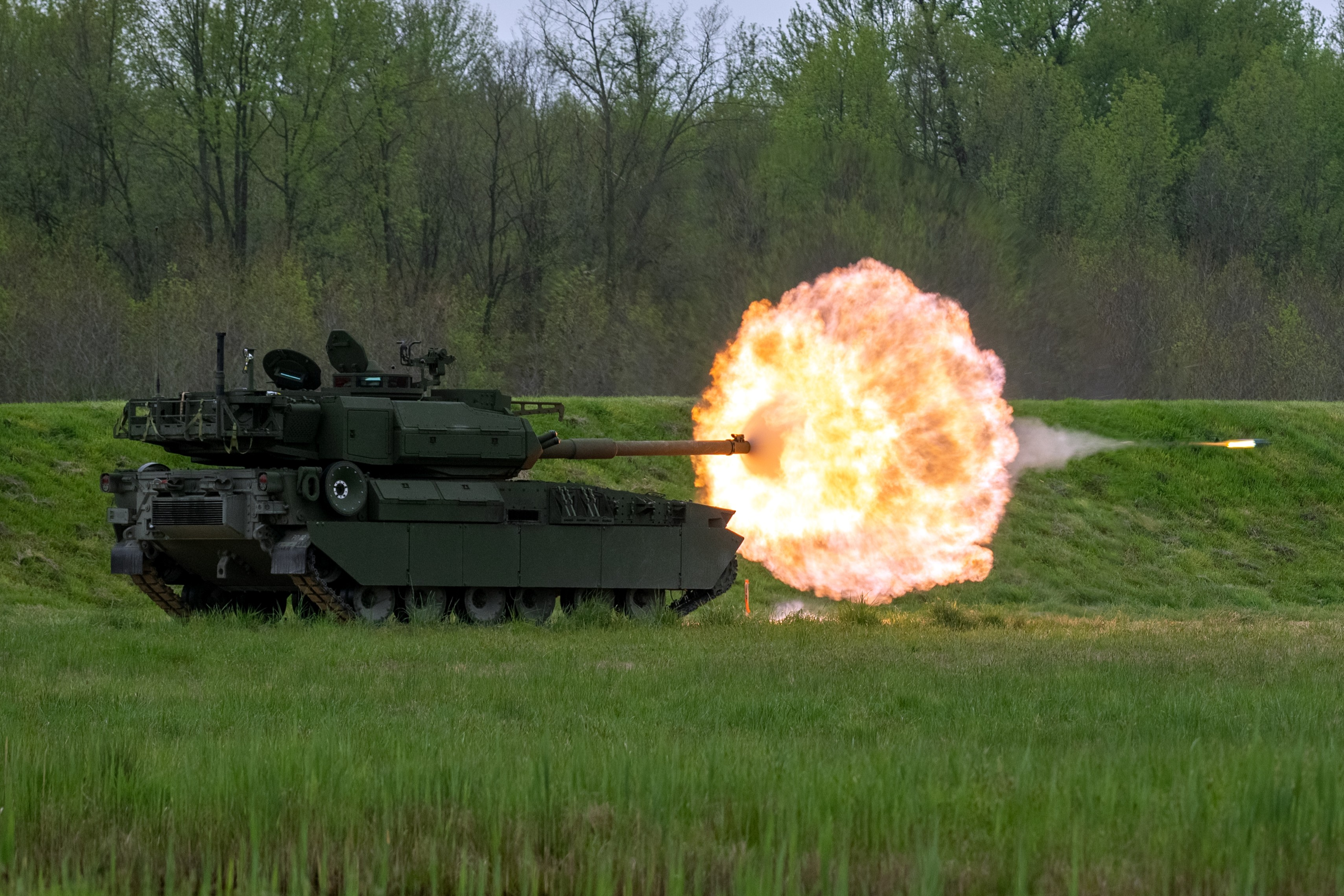
M10 Booker firing its M35 main gun in 2024

The M10 Booker is an armored vehicle that is intended to support our Infantry Brigade Combat Teams by suppressing and destroying fortifications, gun systems and trench routes, and then secondarily providing protection against enemy armored vehicles.

— Maj. Gen. Glenn Dean, program executive officer of Army Ground Combat Systems.,

As of 2023, there is a limited quantity of serviceable 105 mm ammunition for MPF training and operational use. As such, there could be a requirement to procure additional 105 mm ammunition.

In 2023, MPF product manager LTC Peter George said that although the Ajax was the starting point for the GDLS MPF, the current chassis shares little in common with the Ajax and "it's difficult to see the similarities."

== Gallery ==
BAE XM1302 MPF pilot vehicle 2 at the U.S. Army Armor & Cavalry Collection, Fort Benning.

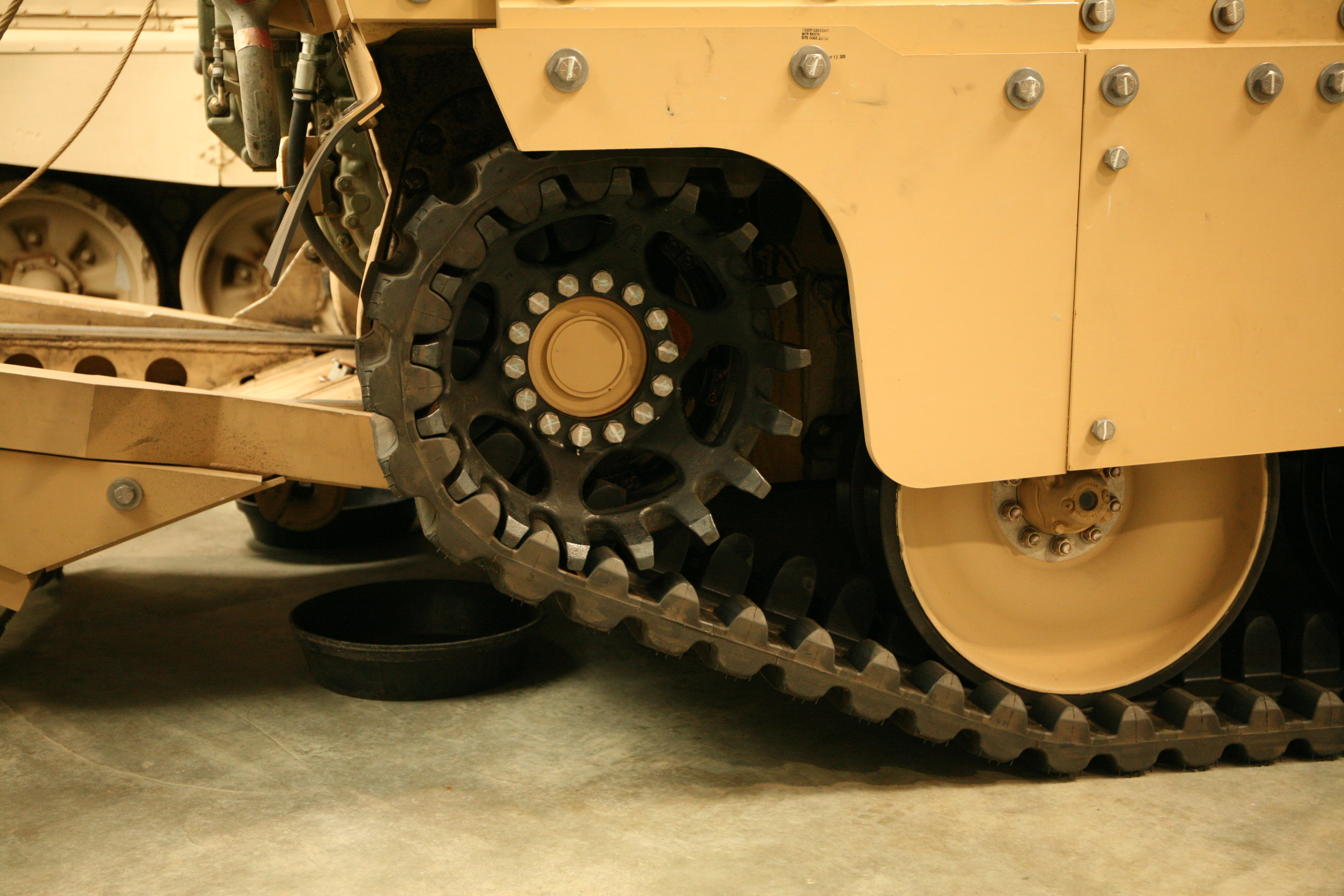
Rubber band track

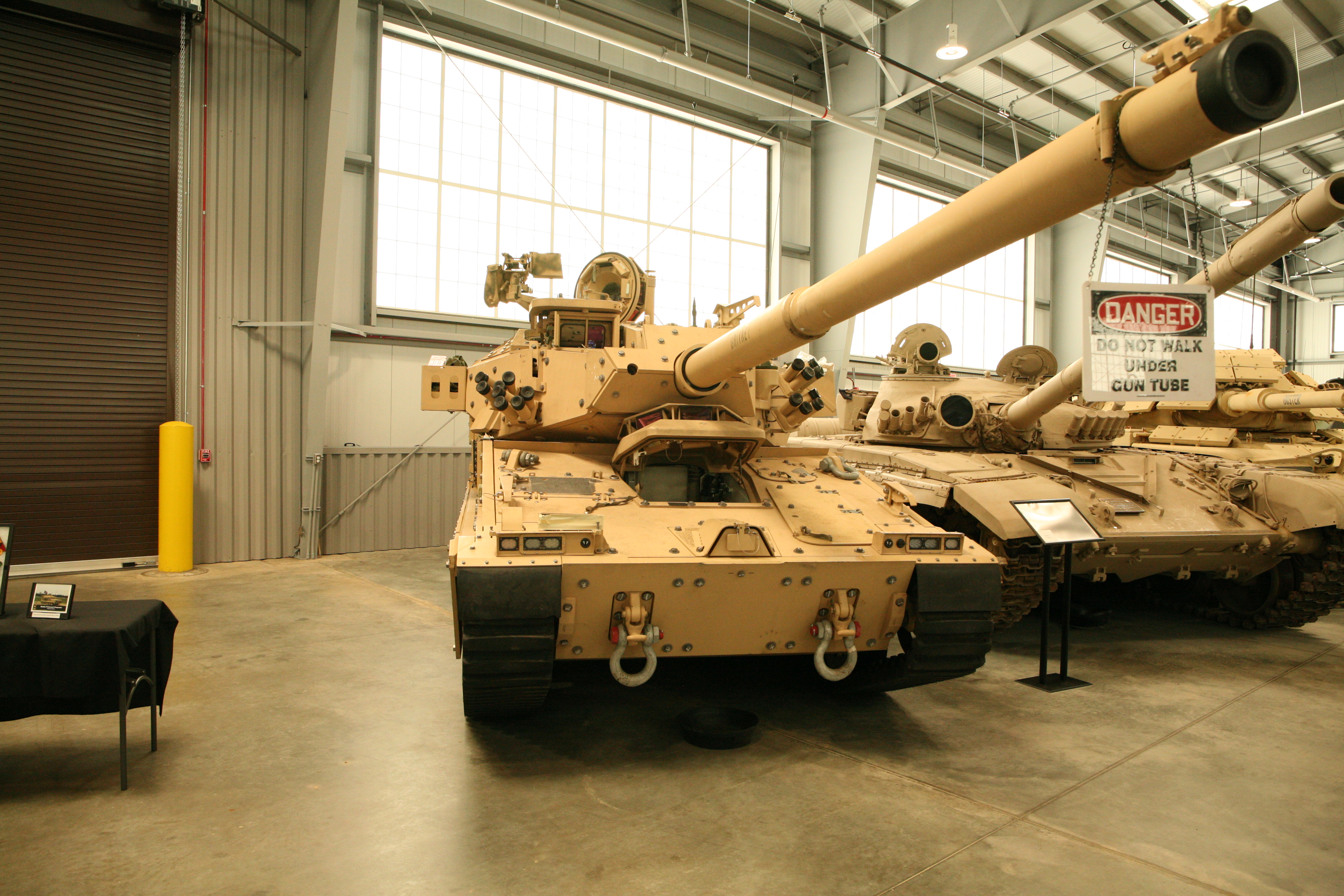

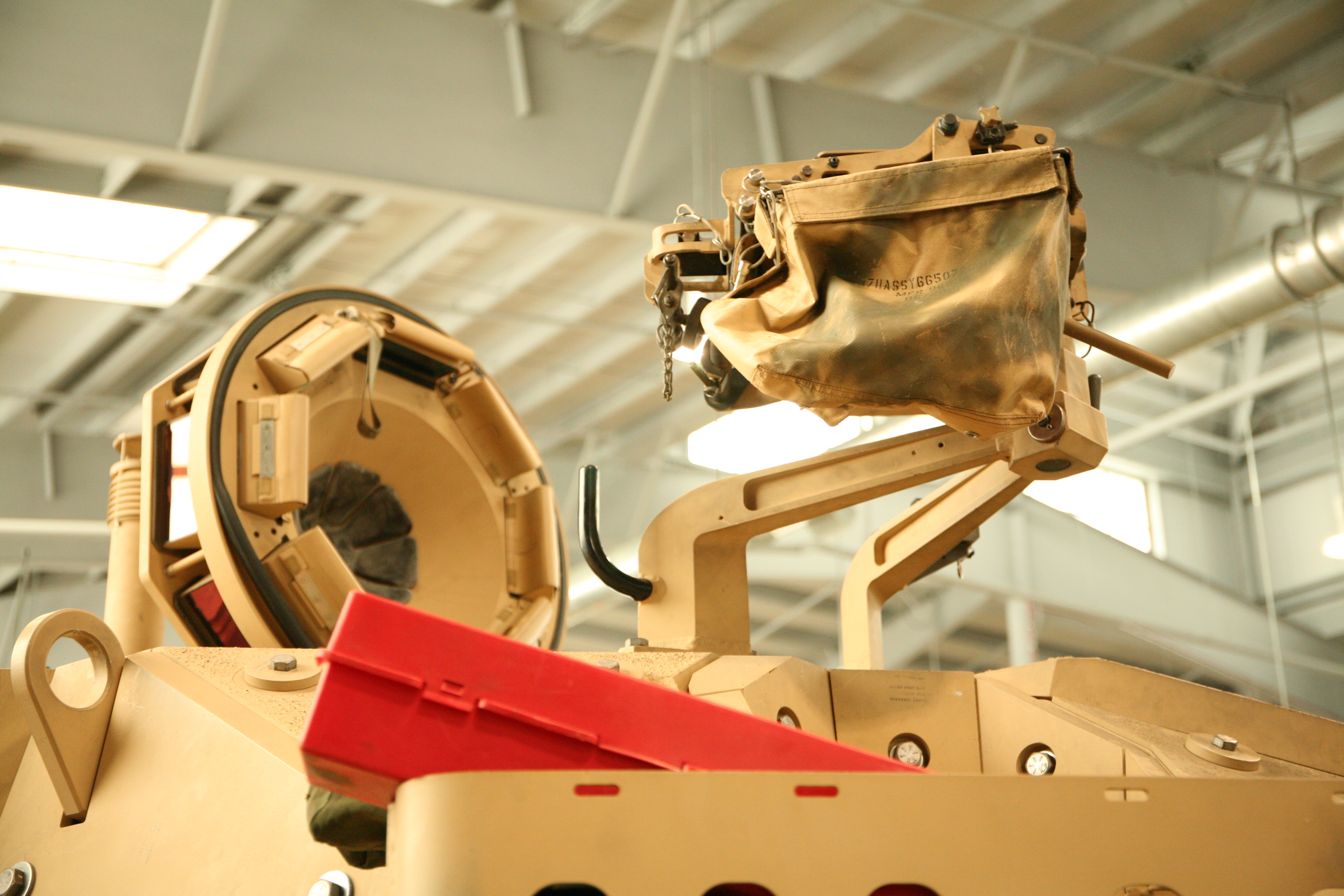
Commander's hatch

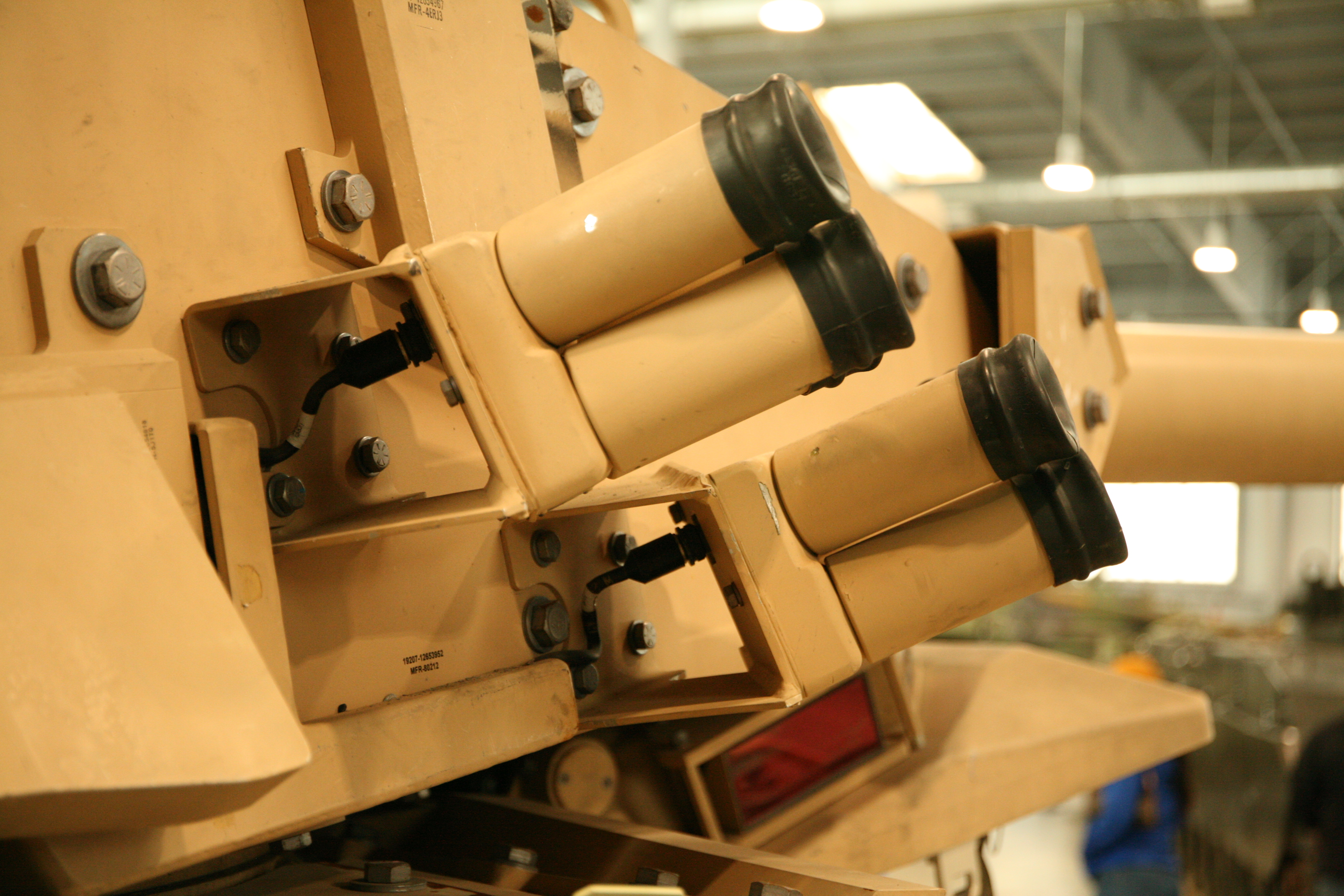
M257 smoke grenade launchers

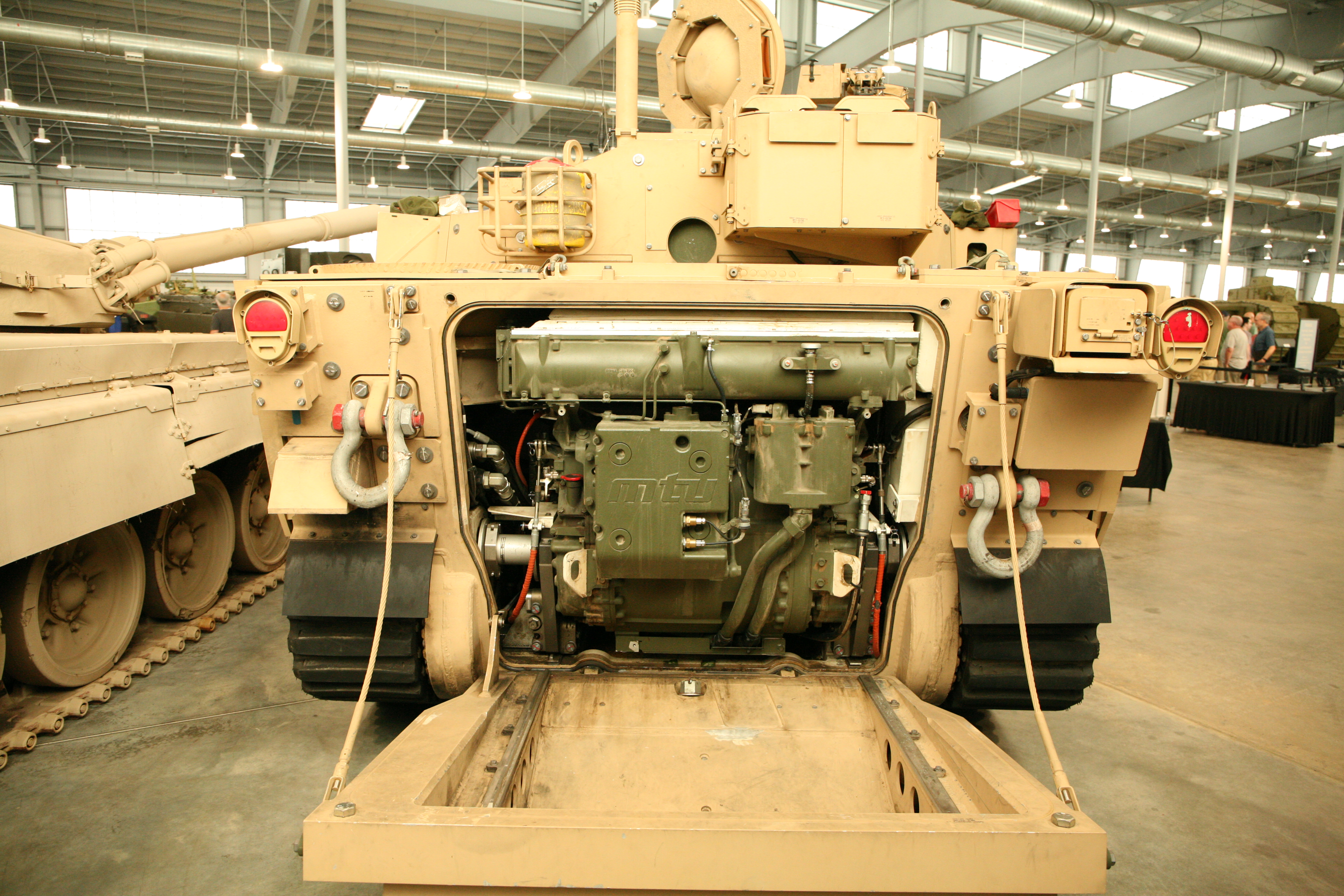
rear view

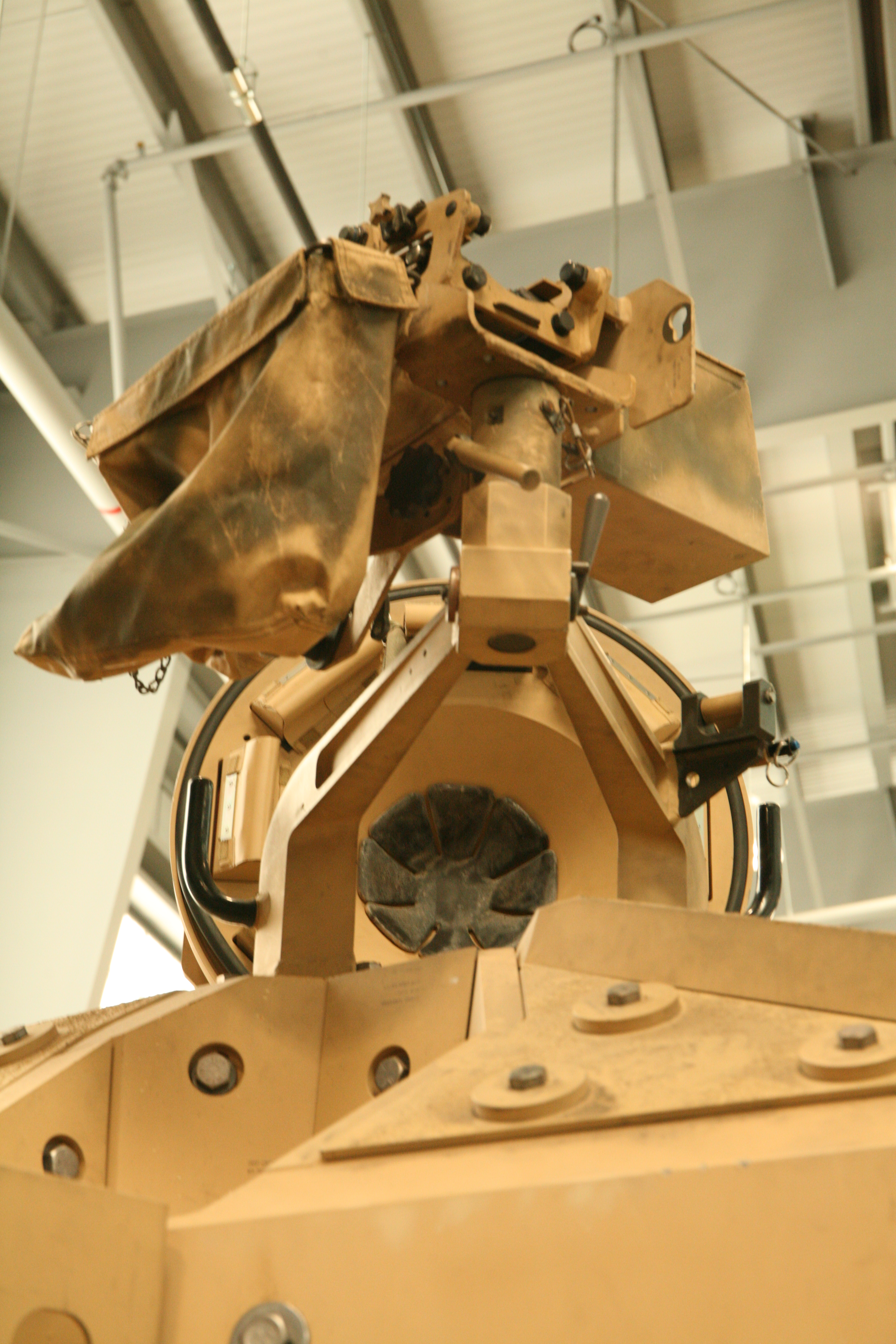
Weapon mount

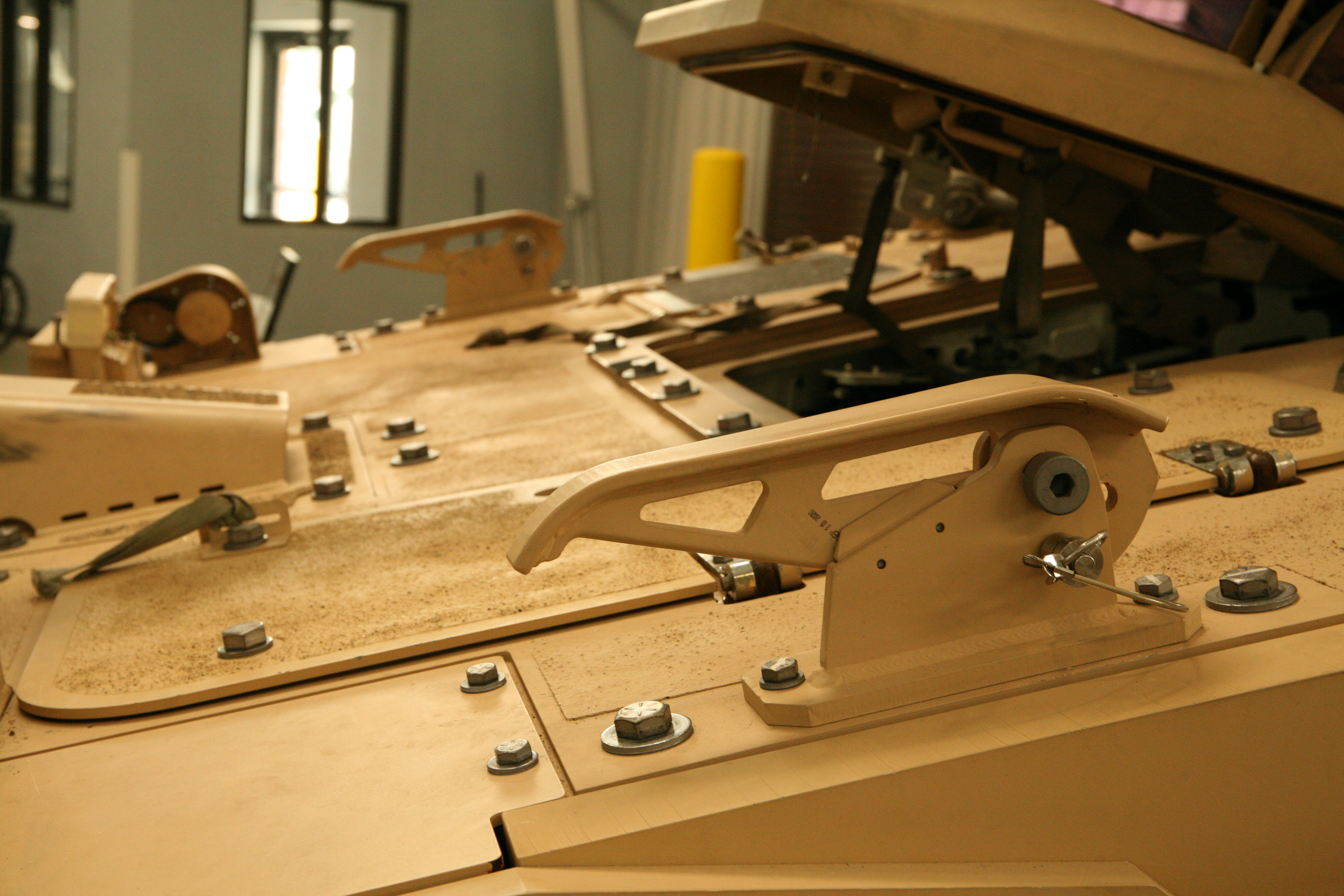
Wire cutters

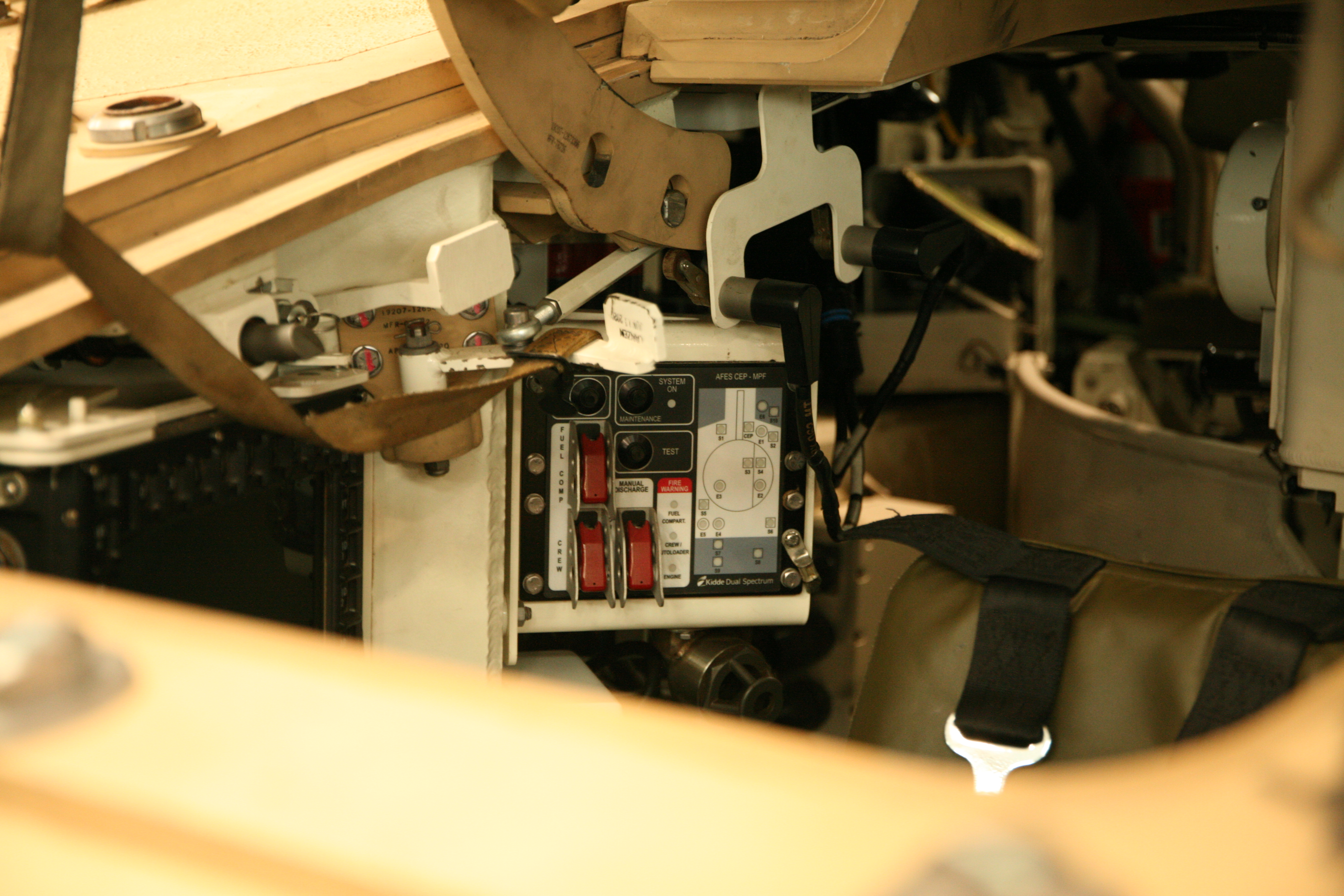
Kidde Control Electronics Panel fire suppression system

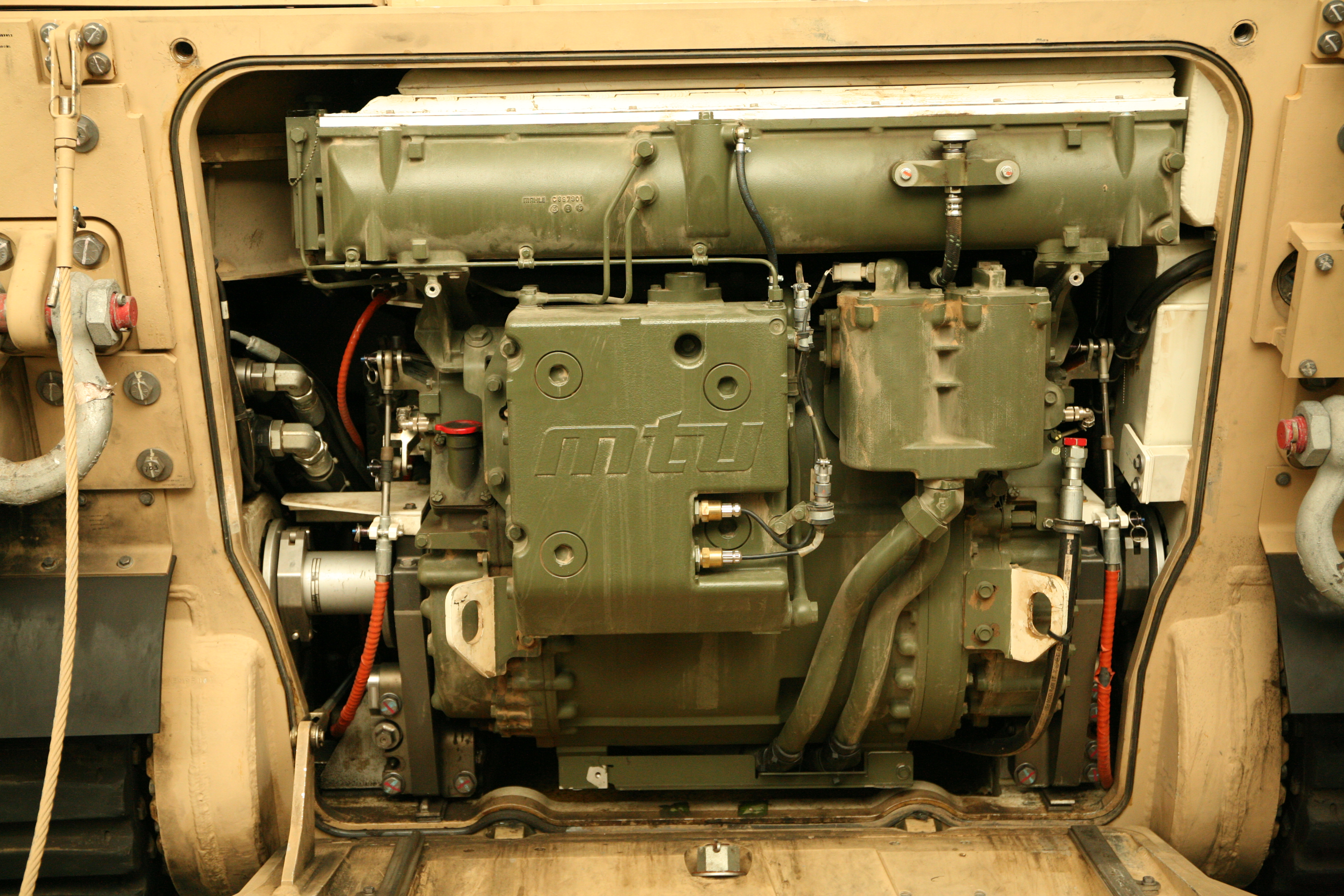
Engine

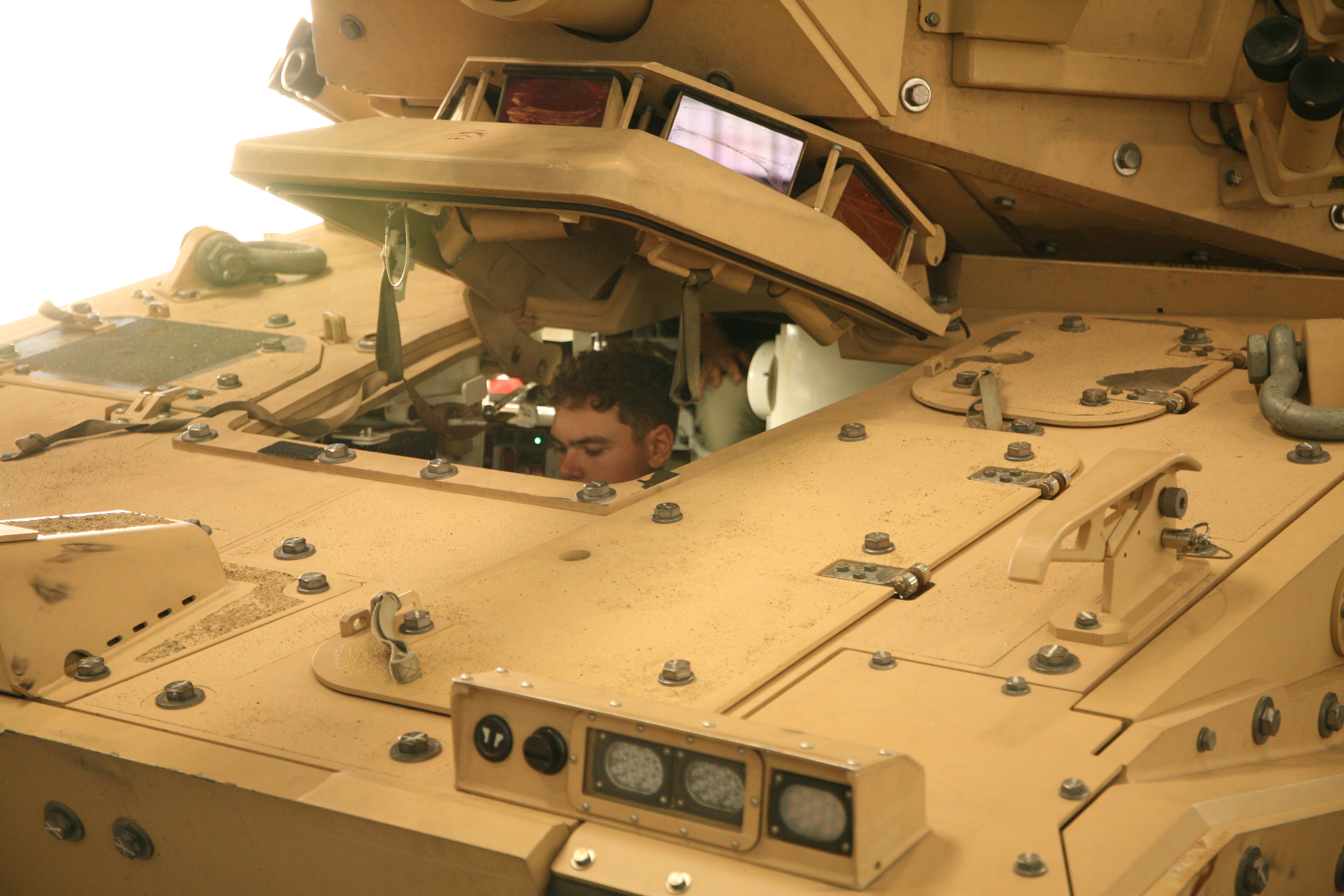
Driver's hatch

== See also ==
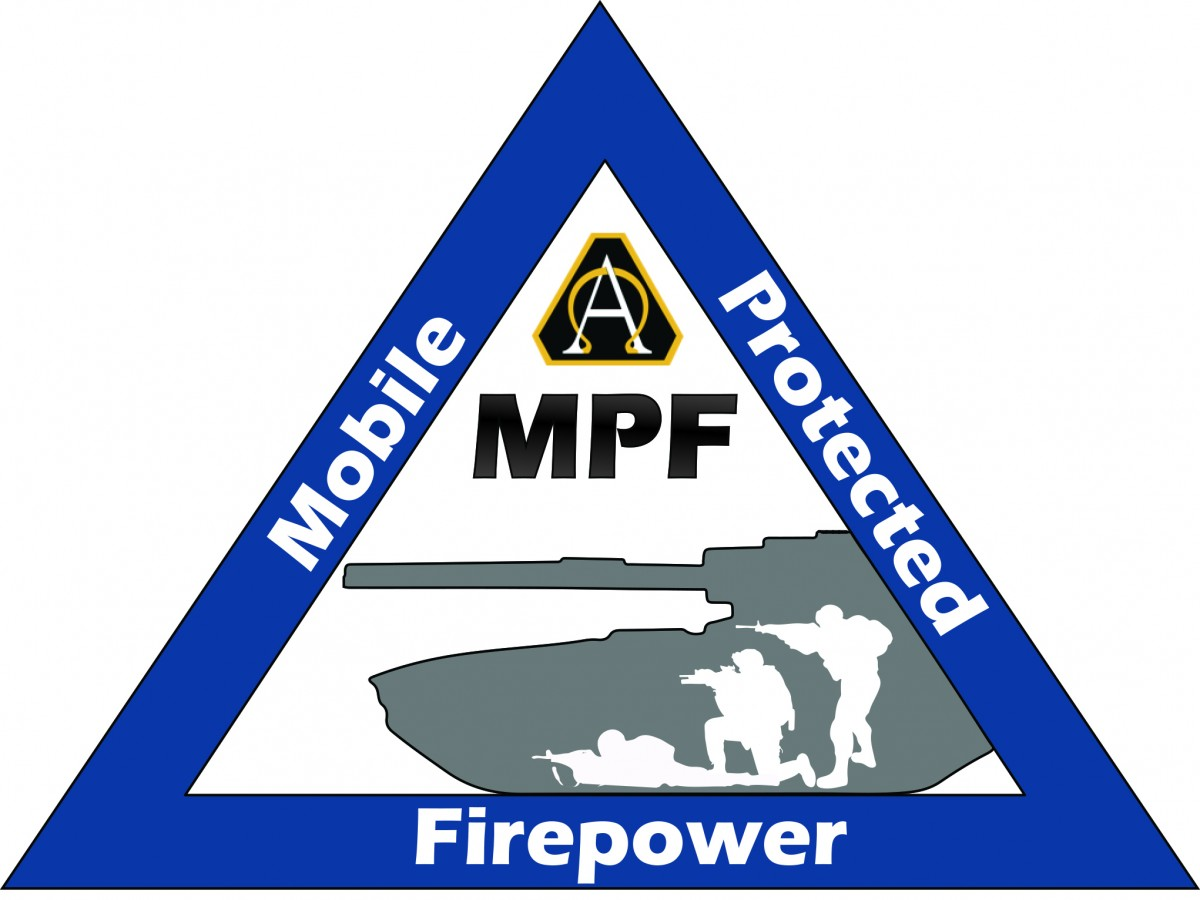
Mobile Protected Firepower logo

- M1128 mobile gun system, an assault gun variant based on the Stryker chassis
- M1134 anti-tank guided missile vehicle, a Stryker tank destroyer variant
- MGM-166 LOSAT, a canceled U.S. Army line-of-sight guided missile
- XM1202 mounted combat system, a U.S. Army Future Combat Systems 20-ton tank canceled in 2011
- XM1219 armed robotic vehicle, a U.S. Army Future Combat Systems unmanned ground combat vehicle canceled in 2011

== Bibliography ==
- Freeman, Major Marshall A. (5 April 1991). The Army Needs a Strategic Armored Gun System—Now! (PDF) (War College Individual Study Project). U.S. Army War College, Carlisle Barracks. Archived (PDF) from the original on 12 May 2022. This article incorporates text from this source, which is in the public domain.
- Hunnicutt, Richard Pearce (2015a) [1995]. Sheridan: A History of the American Light Tank. Vol. 2. Battleboro, VT: Echo Point Books & Media. ISBN 978-1-62654-154-2.
- Zaloga, Stephen J. (2009). M551 Sheridan, US Airmobile Tanks 1941–2001. Oxford: Osprey Publishing Ltd. ISBN 978-1-84603-391-9.
