= Robert Booker =

Robert Booker may refer to:

- Robert D. Booker (1920–1943), United States Army soldier and Medal of Honor recipient
- Robert Booker (politician) (1935–2024), American historian, author, and politician
- Bob Booker (born 1958), English footballer
