= XM360 =

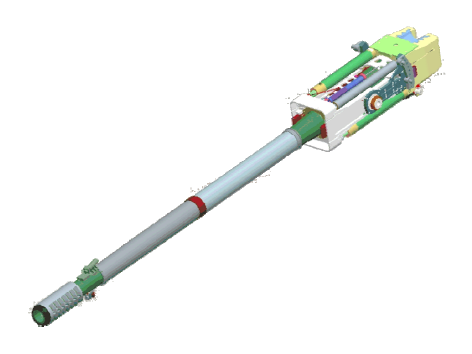
- Type: Tank gun
- Place of origin: United States

Production history
- Variants: XM360E1

Specifications
- Caliber: 120×570mm

The XM360 is an American experimental 120 mm tank gun developed by U.S. Army's Watervliet Arsenal, Benét Laboratories for use by General Dynamics Land Systems (GDLS) on one of their proposals for the Future Combat Systems (FCS). It was developed as a lightweight cannon that could equal or surpass the capabilities of the 120 mm M256 mounted on the M1A2 Abrams while being mounted on a much lighter vehicle. To achieve this the XM360 combined technologies such as gun tube with composite overwrapping and a modular recoil mechanism coupled with a muzzle brake.

The XM360 has the capability to fire the same standard 120 mm NATO ammunition as the M256 while also being able to fire munitions such as the indirect fire laser guided Mid-Range Munition (MRM).

== Variants ==
=== XM360 ===
The baseline variant.

=== XM360E1 ===
A variant with increased maximum chamber pressure, no muzzle brake and other minor modifications intended for a future M1 Abrams variant.

== Specifications ==
=== XM360 ===
- Weight: 1860 kg / 4100 lb
- Length: 5930 mm

== Applications ==
- XM1202 Future Combat Systems Mounted Combat System
- GDLS AbramsX technology demonstrator
- GDLS Griffin Technology Demonstrator

== See also ==
- XM291, American electrothermal-chemical tank gun
