= General Dynamics Griffin =

Series of American armored fighting vehicles

Griffin
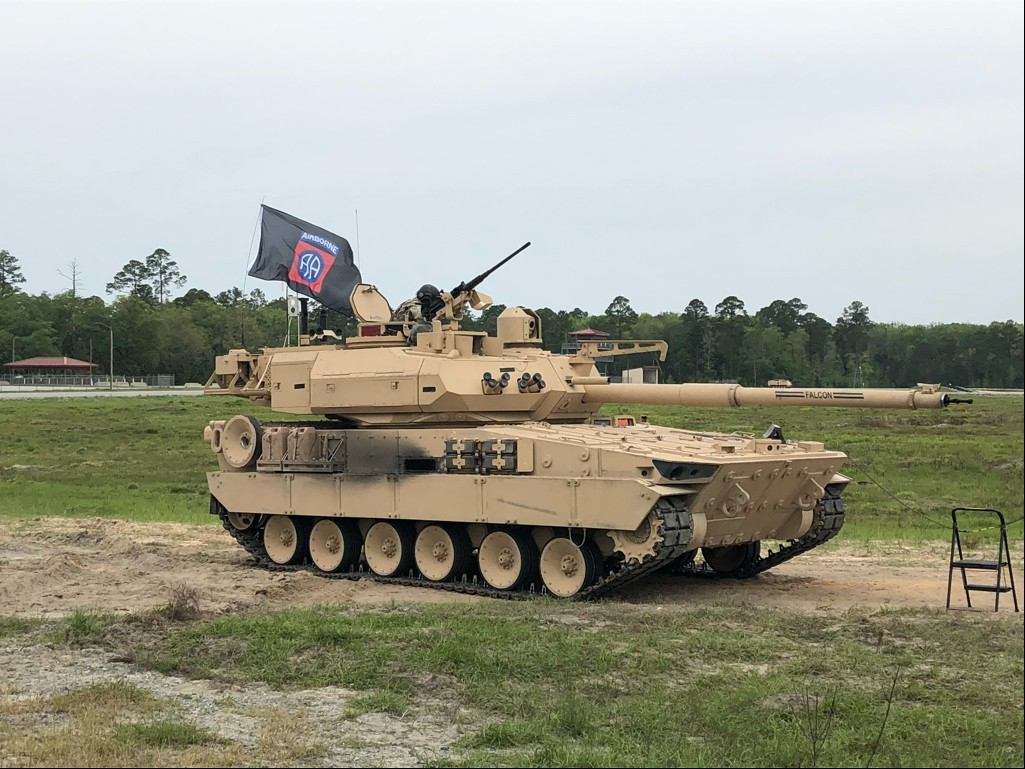
- Griffin II Mobile Protected Firepower for U.S. Army circa 2022
- Type: Armored fighting vehicle
- Place of origin: United States

Production history
- Designer: General Dynamics Land Systems

Specifications
- Mass: 27–28 tons (Griffin - TD, based on Ajax configuration) roughly 38 tons (Griffin II); 38–50 tons (Griffin III)
- Main armament: 120mm XM360 gun (for Griffin - TD); 105mm M35 gun (for Griffin II); 50mm XM913 gun (for Griffin III)
- Secondary armament: 1 × 0.50 caliber (12.7 mm) M2HB heavy machine gun 1 × 7.62 mm (.308 in) M240B machine gun
- Engine: diesel
- Suspension: Hydropneumatic

The General Dynamics Griffin is a series of armored fighting vehicles under development by General Dynamics Land Systems (GDLS) for the United States Army. The Griffin is a derivative of ASCOD 2 family of AFVs, which was also designed by GDLS.

== Platform ==
=== Griffin Technology Demonstrator ===
At AUSA 2016 annual meeting, General Dynamics unveiled 120mm Griffin Technology Demonstrator (TD) as a "conversation starter" for the US Army Mobile Protected Firepower (MPF) program. MPF is a light tracked vehicle intended to provide support of large caliber direct fire for Infantry Brigade Combat Team. The chassis of Griffin I shown at AUSA is from British Scout SV program (now called General Dynamics Ajax), but it only has six road wheels. The welded aluminum turret is armed with 120mm XM360 lightweight gun which was developed by the Army Research, Development and Engineering Center. The XM360 gun was developed as part of the canceled Future Combat Systems (FCS) program.

=== Griffin II ===
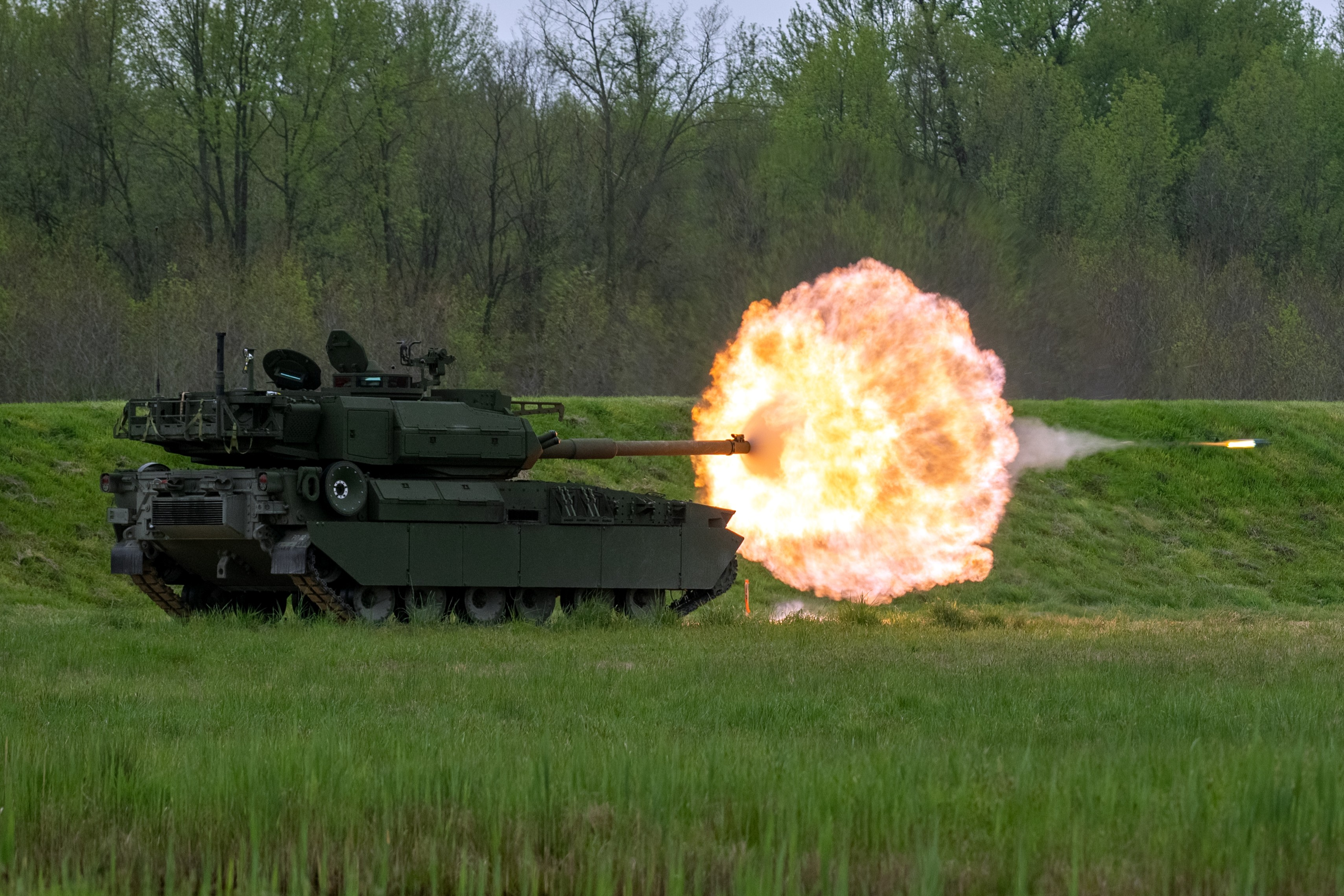
An M10 Booker firing its 105 mm caliber M35 gun in 2024

The Griffin II was offered under the Army's Mobile Protected Firepower (MPF). In accordance with the program's caliber requirements, it incorporated a 105 mm M35 tank gun and a redesigned chassis. In December 2018, GDLS was downselected, along with BAE Systems, to develop prototypes. GDLS presented its first prototype in April 2020. BAE's M8 AGS proposal was disqualified in March 2022.

In June 2022, GDLS won the Mobile Protected Firepower program competition and was awarded a contract worth up to $1.14 billion. In June 2023, MPF was officially designated as M10 Booker, named after Staff Sgt. Stevon A. Booker and Pvt. Robert D. Booker.

=== Griffin III ===
Griffin III was first unveiled at the Association of the United States Army's 2018 Exposition in Huntsville, Alabama. It was being offered under Army's XM30 Mechanized Infantry Combat Vehicle (MICV) program with six fully equipped infantry carrying option in the back. This version, while similar in weight to Griffin II, scaled down the main gun from 105mm caliber to the 50 mm XM913 gun system. It is equipped with the IMI Systems’ Iron Fist Active Protection System (APS) and AeroVironment’s Switchblade loitering munition system.

== See also ==
- M1128 mobile gun system – (United States, Canada)
- Sabrah light tank – (Israel, Spain, Czech Republic)
- Type 15 tank – (China)
