= M10 Booker =

American armored fighting vehicle

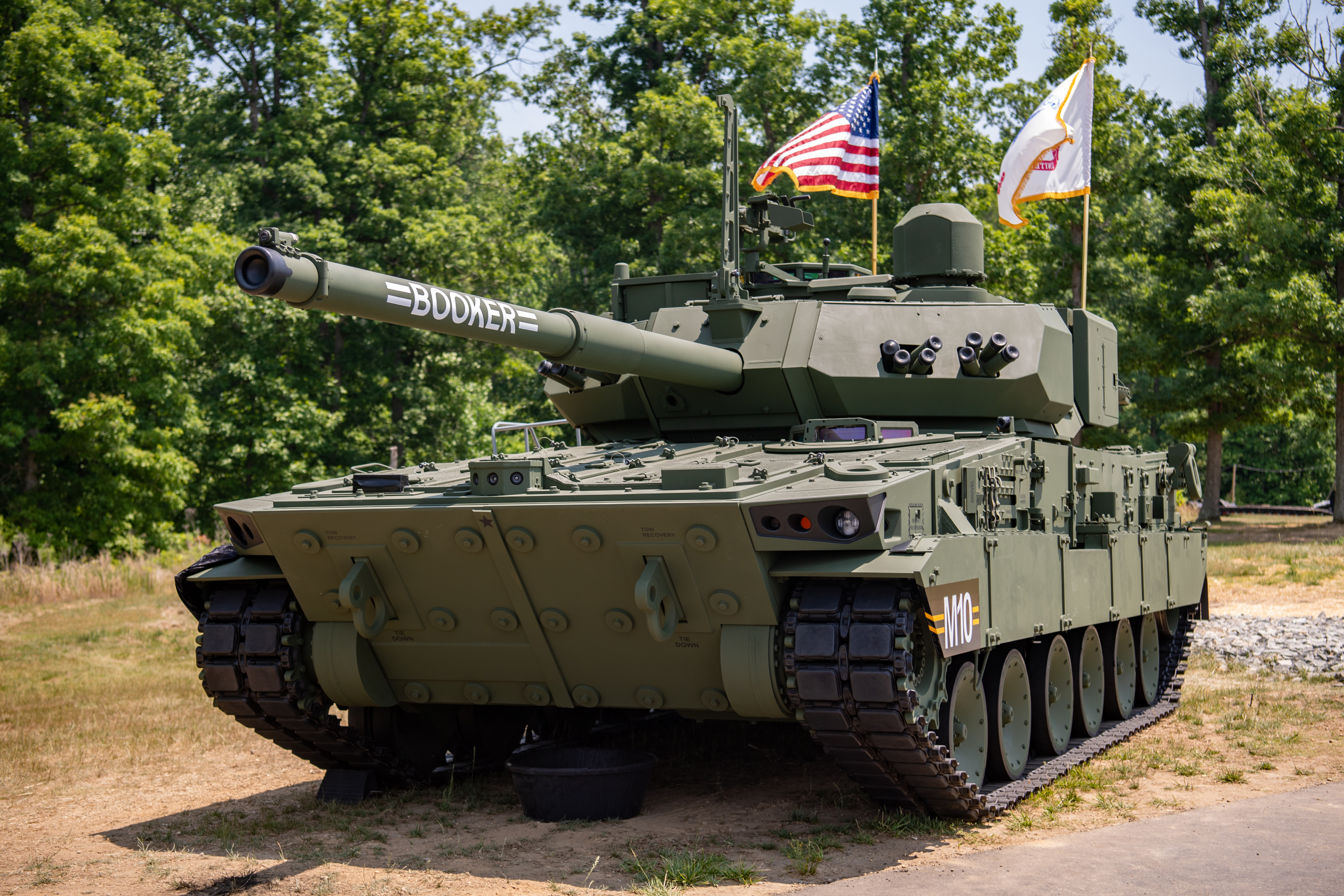
- M10 Booker at its unveiling in June 2023
- Type: Assault gun Armored infantry support vehicle
- Place of origin: United States

Service history
- In service: 2024–2025 (testing)
- Used by: See Operators

Production history
- Designer: General Dynamics Land Systems
- Developed from: ASCOD 2

Specifications
- Mass: Roughly 38–42 tonnes (37–41 long tons; 42–46 short tons)
- Crew: 4 (commander, gunner, driver, loader)
- Main armament: 1 × 105 mm M35 tank gun
- Secondary armament: 1 × 12.7 mm M2HB heavy machine gun 1 × 7.62 mm M240B machine gun
- Engine: Diesel MTU 8V199 TE23; 15.9 L, 800 hp (600 kW)
- Transmission: Allison Transmission 3040 MX cross-drive
- Suspension: Hydropneumatic
- Operational range: 250–350 mi (400–560 km)
- Maximum speed: 40 mph (64 km/h)

The M10 Booker is an American assault gun produced by General Dynamics Land Systems (GDLS) for the United States Army. The M10 was developed from the GDLS Griffin II armored fighting vehicle as the winner of its Mobile Protected Firepower (MPF) program in June 2022. The initial contract was for 96 low rate initial production (LRIP) vehicles, the first of which were delivered in February 2024.

The Army canceled the Booker in 2025, partly due to its excessive weight, but according to tank historian Nicholas Moran, due to shifting priorities in the US military budget, where the M10 did not meet the required need for continued funding. The Army had taken delivery of at least 26 vehicles before the program's cancelation. These have an uncertain future and may be transferred to armored units, sold abroad, or placed in storage.

== Classification ==
The vehicle has been called a light tank by some military officers and media due to its design, thinner armor and appearance, despite Army officials connected to the MPF program pointing out the statement as false. The vehicle weighs about 38–42 tons (close to the weight of the T-72A), which is equivalent to various medium and older Russian main battle tanks operated by other nations. Due to its light armor in combination with its heavy weight, it is not fit to be described as a light tank. Even by design philosophy, it is not designed to fit the typical tank role by modern standards, and will essentially serve the role of an assault gun based on its description.

The defense industry magazine European Security & Defence reported in January 2025 that the Pentagon had spoken out against the light tank characterization.

Major General Glenn Dean, Program Executive Officer for Ground Combat Systems, separately stressed that "light tanks" historically have performed reconnaissance functions, "and this is not a reconnaissance vehicle, it’s an assault gun". Dean stated the M10 is intended for use against fortifications and to defend against hostile armor.

According to product manager Lt. Col. Pete George, the M10 is defined as an "armored infantry support vehicle".

== Background and selection ==
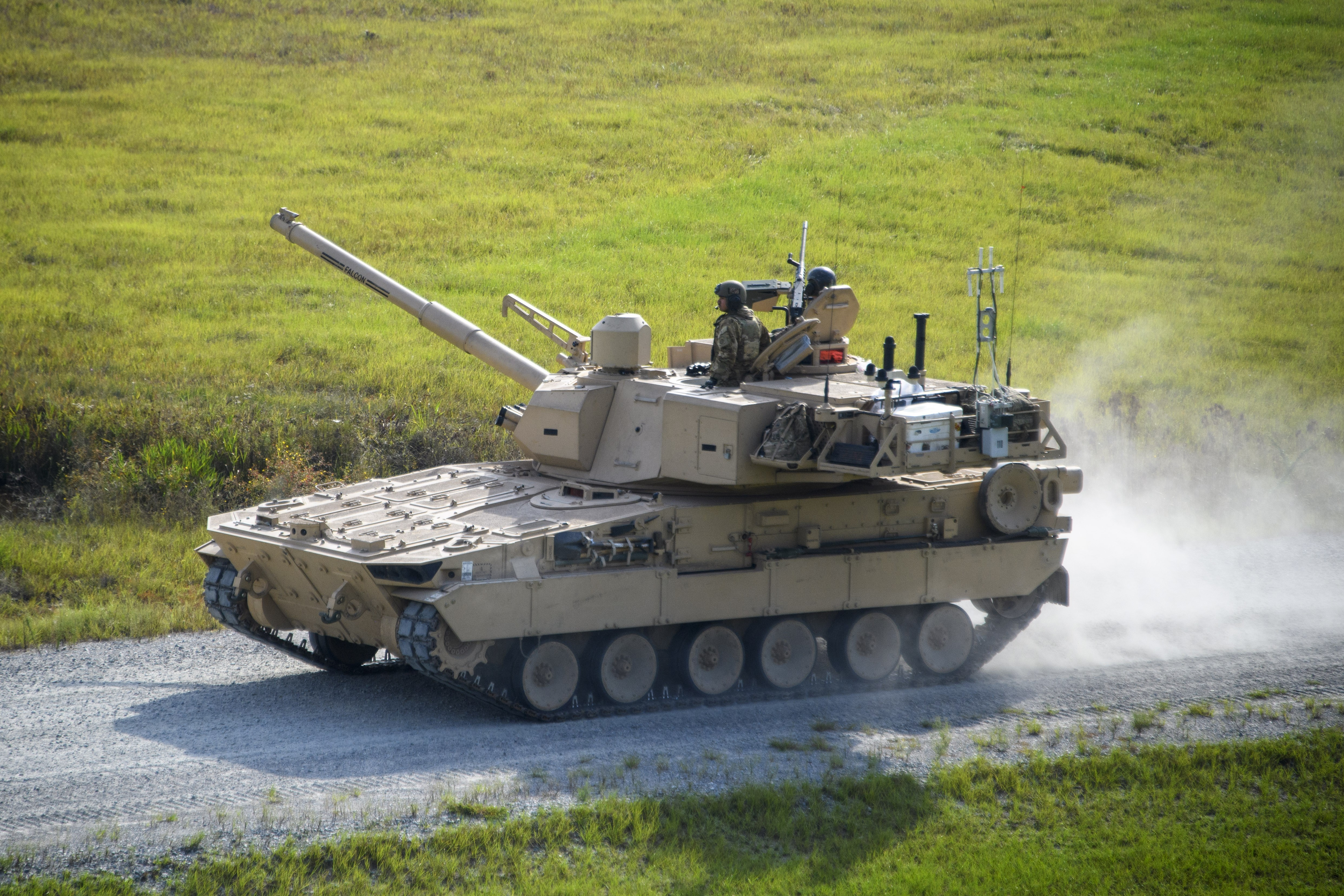
An M10 Booker on the move

Derived from the Austrian-Spanish ASCOD 2 infantry fighting vehicle-platform, the GDLS Griffin II was developed under the Army's MPF program. In accordance with the program's caliber requirements, it incorporated a 105 mm M35 tank gun and a redesigned chassis.

The M35 was originally designed and developed by Benét Laboratories, Watervliet Arsenal, in 1983 for the Marine Corps' Mobile Protected Gun Program. It was later incorporated in the Army's M8 Armored Gun System light tank, which was canceled in 1996. The M35 is about 1,800 lb (816 kg) lighter than the M68 tank gun used on the M60 tank.

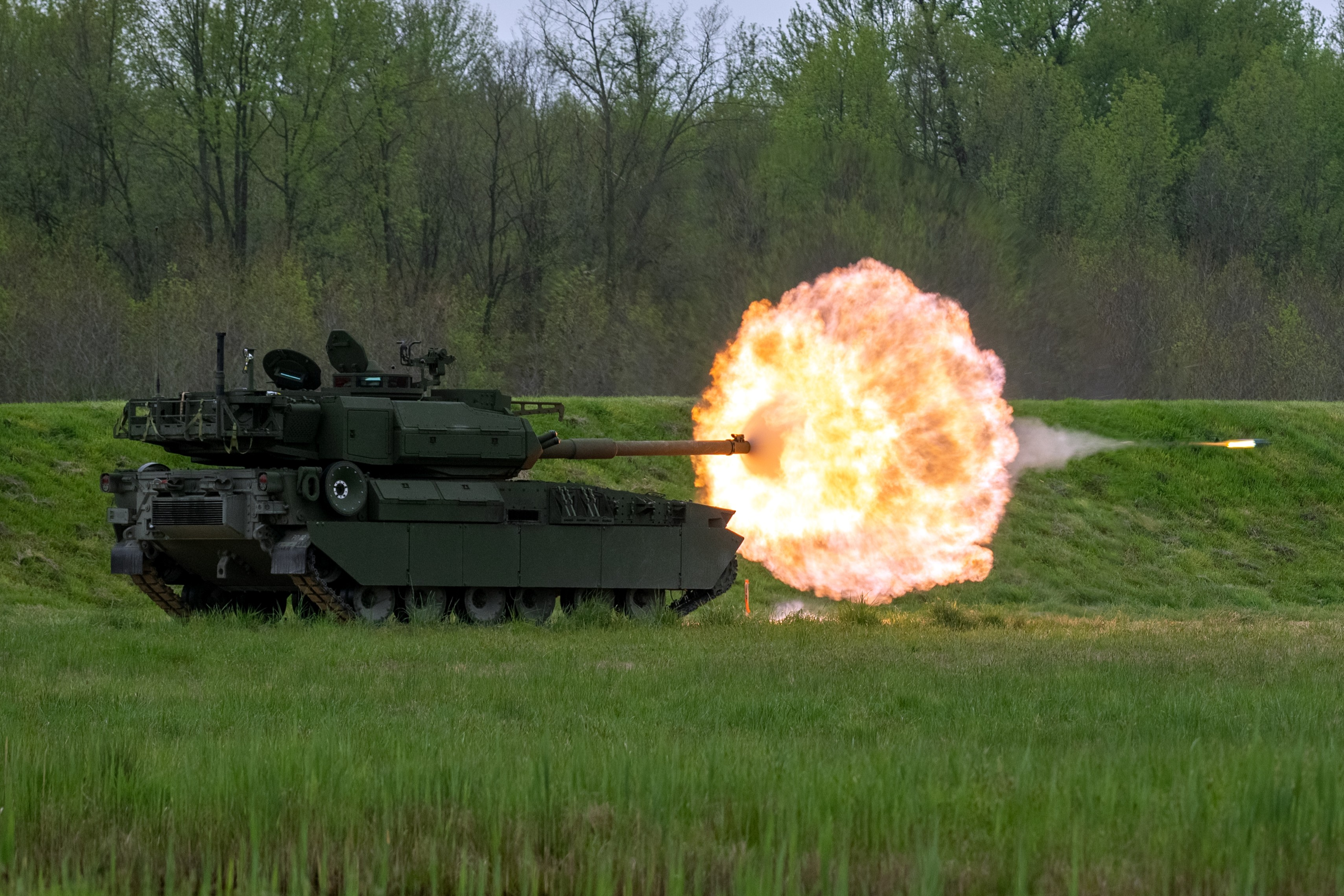
An M10 Booker firing its 105 mm M35 cannon in 2024

In December 2018, GDLS was selected, along with BAE Systems, to develop prototypes. GDLS presented its first prototype in April 2020. BAE's M8 AGS proposal was disqualified in March 2022. In June 2022, GDLS won the MPF program competition and was awarded a contract worth up to $1.14 billion to build up to 96 vehicles. The first lot consisted of 26 vehicles.

=== Name ===
The MPF was officially designated "M10 Booker" in June 2023, named for American soldiers Private Robert D. Booker and Staff Sergeant Stevon Booker. Robert Booker was killed on 9 April 1943 during the Tunisian campaign of World War II, and was posthumously awarded the Medal of Honor. Stevon Booker was killed on 5 April 2003 during a "Thunder Run" in the 2003 invasion of Iraq, and was awarded the Distinguished Service Cross.

== Development ==
=== Design ===
The M10 Booker was developed to address a gap in U.S. Army Infantry Brigade Combat Teams (IBCTs) by providing a mobile, protected, direct fire capability to neutralize enemy fortified positions, heavy machine guns, and armored vehicle threats. The U.S. Army planned to field 14 M10 Bookers per IBCT, ensuring enhanced firepower and maneuverability in both offensive and defensive operations.

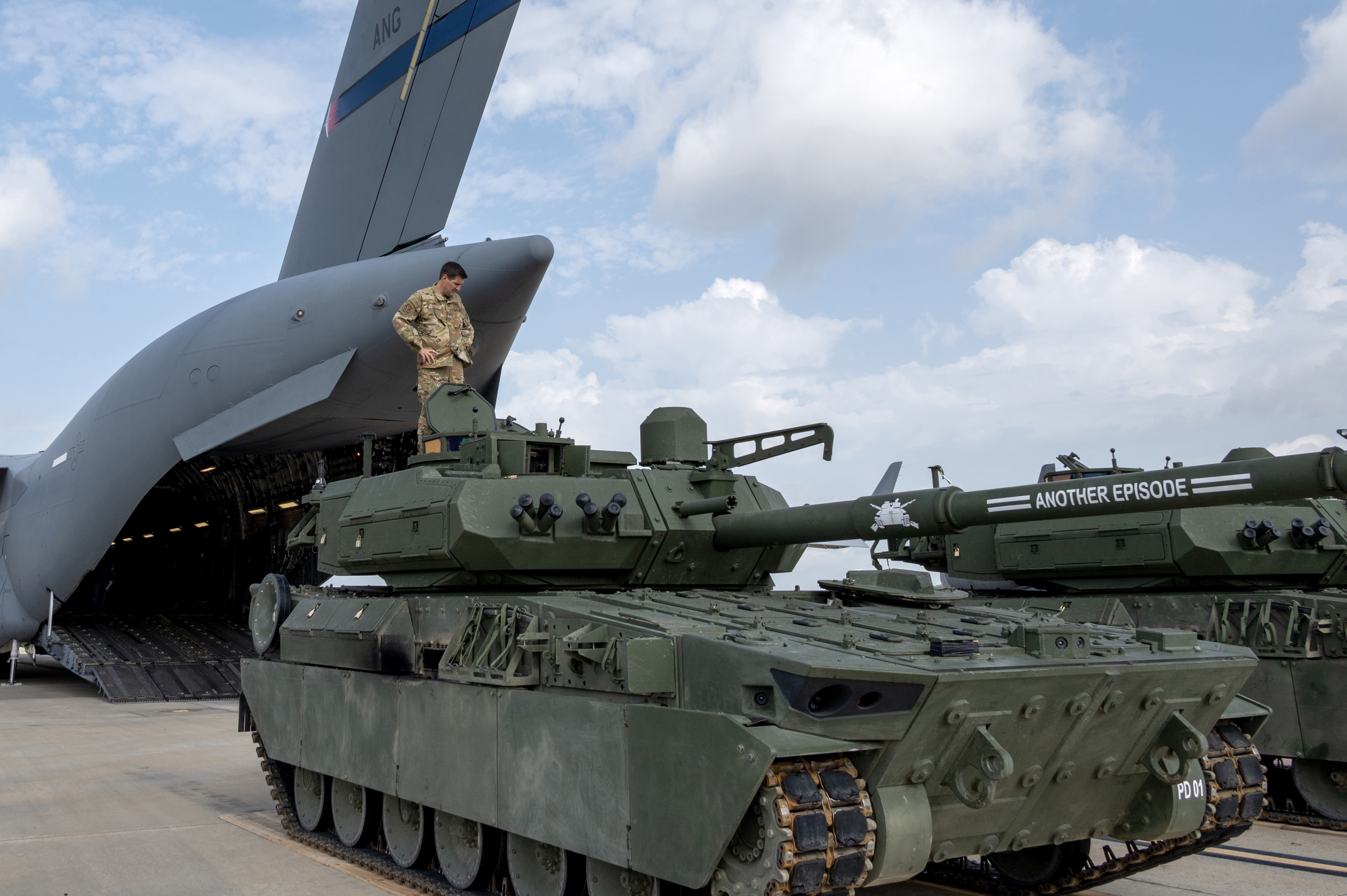
Two M10 Bookers being loaded onto a C-17

The M10 Booker features a fully tracked chassis, a four-person crew, and is armed with an M35 105mm main gun controlled by the same fire control system as the M1A2 Abrams, along with an M240C 7.62mm coaxial machine gun, and an M2 .50 caliber machine gun for the commander. It incorporates modular armor, smoke grenade launchers, ammunition stowage blowout panels, and an automatic fire suppression system to enhance battlefield survivability. The Booker is also equipped with Safran Optics 1's PASEO Commander's Independent Tactical Viewer (CITV) to increase the commander's situational awareness and to improve targeting capabilities.

A feature of the M10 Booker was supposed to be its air transportability; its intended 38-ton weight would have allowed two M10 Bookers to be carried in a single C-17 Globemaster III, whereas the C-17 can only carry one M1 Abrams tank, which supposedly would have enhanced rapid deployment capabilities. However, the Booker's weight increased to 42 tons and the U.S. Air Force ruled that a C-17 could only carry one Booker. The Army initially wanted a vehicle that could be airdropped, but at 42 tons, the Booker cannot be airdropped. The Army envisioned the M10 Booker as a crucial asset for IBCT operations, particularly in forced and early entry missions where anti-access/area denial (A2/AD) conditions exist.

=== Production and testing ===
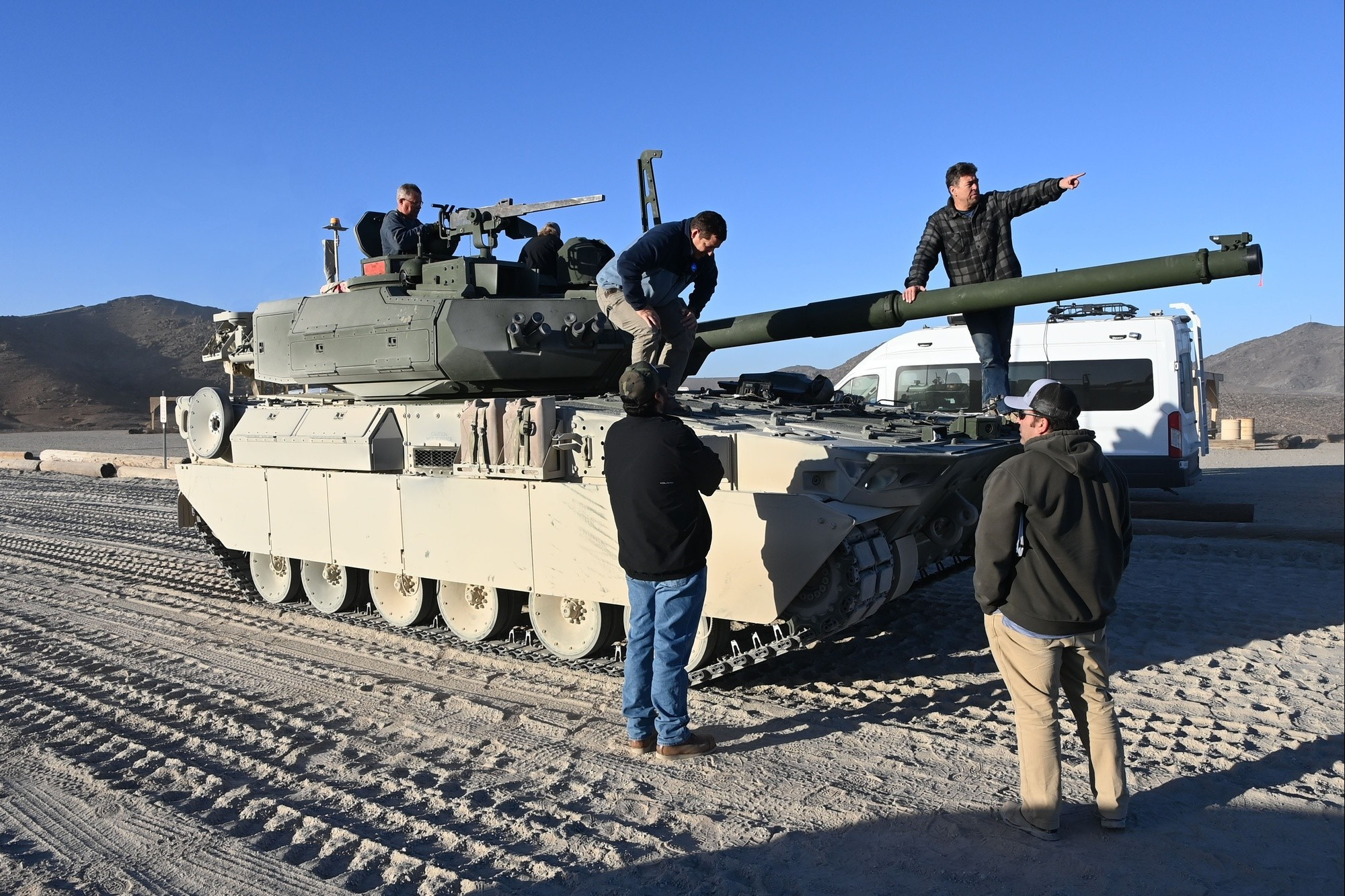
M10 desert testing at Yuma Test Center

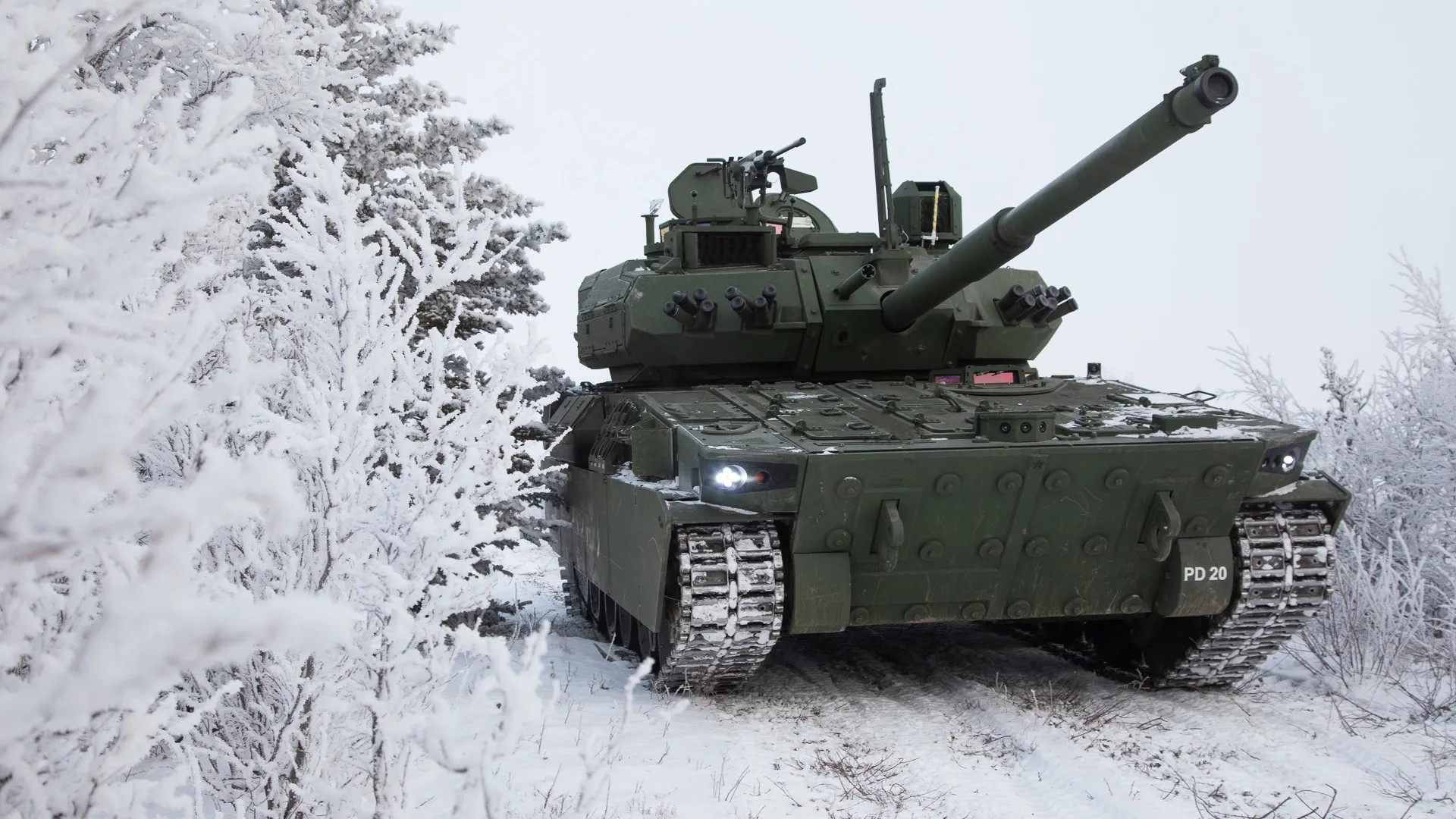
M10 arctic testing at Arctic Regions Test Center

The U.S. Army took delivery of the first production vehicle in February 2024. The M10 underwent testing and evaluation in Arizona and Alaska in early 2025. In May 2024, the U.S. Army issued a solicitation for full-rate production; however, this solicitation was cancelled in May 2025 after approximately 26 vehicles were produced.

=== Allocation ===
The U.S. Army was initially set to procure up to 504 M10s, all of which would have been allotted to light divisions in the active duty and National Guard. The 82nd Airborne Division became the first unit equipped when 33 M10s entered the Fort Bragg motor pools in late FY2025, while other M10s were distributed to Fort Campbell with the 101st Airborne Division, to Fort Carson with the 4th Infantry Division, and to Fort Johnson at the Joint Readiness Training Center as of 2018. However, the future use of the M10, if any, is in doubt.

=== Cancellation ===
Equipping the 101st Airborne Division at Fort Campbell, Kentucky, with the Booker was complicated by an analysis that determined that most bridges on the base were not capable of supporting the vehicle's weight.

In April 2025, the Army’s chief technology officer Alex Miller told a reporter that the Booker was an example of "the requirements process creating so much inertia that the Army couldn't get out of its own way". In May 2025, Army Secretary Dan Driscoll and Army Chief of Staff General Randy A. George published "Letter to the Force: Army Transformation Initiative." This letter was in response to Secretary of Defense Pete Hegseth's April 2025, memorandum for senior Pentagon leadership titled "Army Transformation and Acquisition Reform." The Army Transformation Initiative directive stated that the Army would "end procurement of obsolete systems, and cancel or scale back ineffective or redundant programs." The Department of Defense announced in May 2025 that the Booker program was being cancelled. Driscoll indicated that the program was cancelled primarily due to its heavy 42 ton weight. Driscoll derided the Booker as a "heavy tank" and called the program "a classic example of sunk cost fallacy, and the Army doing something wrong".

As of June 2025 program costs exceeded $1 billion and the Army had taken delivery of 26 vehicles. Vehicles in final stages of production will be accepted by the Army. The vehicles have an uncertain future and may be transferred to armored units, sold abroad, or placed in storage.

== Operators ==
United States

- United States Army – 26 (some additional tanks under production)

== See also ==
- M1128 mobile gun system – US Army's previous assault gun based on Stryker
- M551 Sheridan – US Army's last light tank, retired in 1997
- M41 Walker Bulldog – light American tank in the early days of the Cold War
- Commando Stingray – light US tank for export only

International

- 2S25 Sprut-SD – Russian light tank
- Kaplan MT / Harimau – Turkish/Indonesian light tank
- Zorawar – Indian light tank by DRDO and L&T
- Sabrah light tank – Philippine light tank system based on ASCOD 2 and Pandur II
- Type 15 tank – Chinese light tank
- TAM – Argentinian light tank developed by Thyssen Henschel
- B1 Centauro – Italian light tank

== Further information ==
- The Tragic Tale of M10 Booker – Nicholas Moran on youtube.com
