= XM291 =

- Type: Tank gun
- Place of origin: United States

Specifications
- Caliber: 140 mm / 120 mm

The XM291 Advanced Tank Cannon (ATAC) is an American experimental 120 or 140 mm smoothbore tank cannon. It started development in 1991 as a way to substantially increase the performance of tank cannons against the perceived threat of future Russian main battle tanks. It can be used in two configurations, one in 120 mm and one in 140 mm electrothermal-chemical technology (ETC). The XM291 was the first cannon to incorporate a system that counteracted the vibrations in the barrel caused by the tank moving over terrain, using the dynamically tuned shroud (DTS).

While it was originally developed for the Block III tank, development of the Block III was halted while the XM291 saw continuous development and was used on other testbeds such as the CATTB and the M1 Thumper.

== Ammunition ==
Table of ammunition
Designation	Munition type	Calibre	Projectile mass	Muzzle velocity
XM866	Kinetic energy penetrator or Armour-piercing fin-stabilized discarding sabot (KE or APFSDS)	120 mm	5.4 kg	1675 m/s
XM831	High-explosive anti-tank (HEAT)	120 mm	13.6 kg	1145 m/s

== Specifications ==
XM291 (120 mm)

- Barrel length: 6,731 mm / 265 in (56 calibre)
- Weight (total): 1,451 kg / 3,200 lb
- Weight (breech): 590 kg / 1,300 lb
- Weight (hull) :861 kg / 1898 lb

== See also ==
- XM360, American electrothermal-chemical tank gun
- M1 Abrams, American main battle tank
