= M35 tank gun =

American tank gun

M35
- Type: Tank gun
- Place of origin: United States

Production history
- Designer: Benét Laboratories, Watervliet Arsenal
- Designed: 1983
- Manufacturer: Watervliet Arsenal

Specifications
- Mass: complete: 2,921 lb (1,325 kg)
- Cartridge: 105×617mmR
- Caliber: 105 mm (4.1 in)

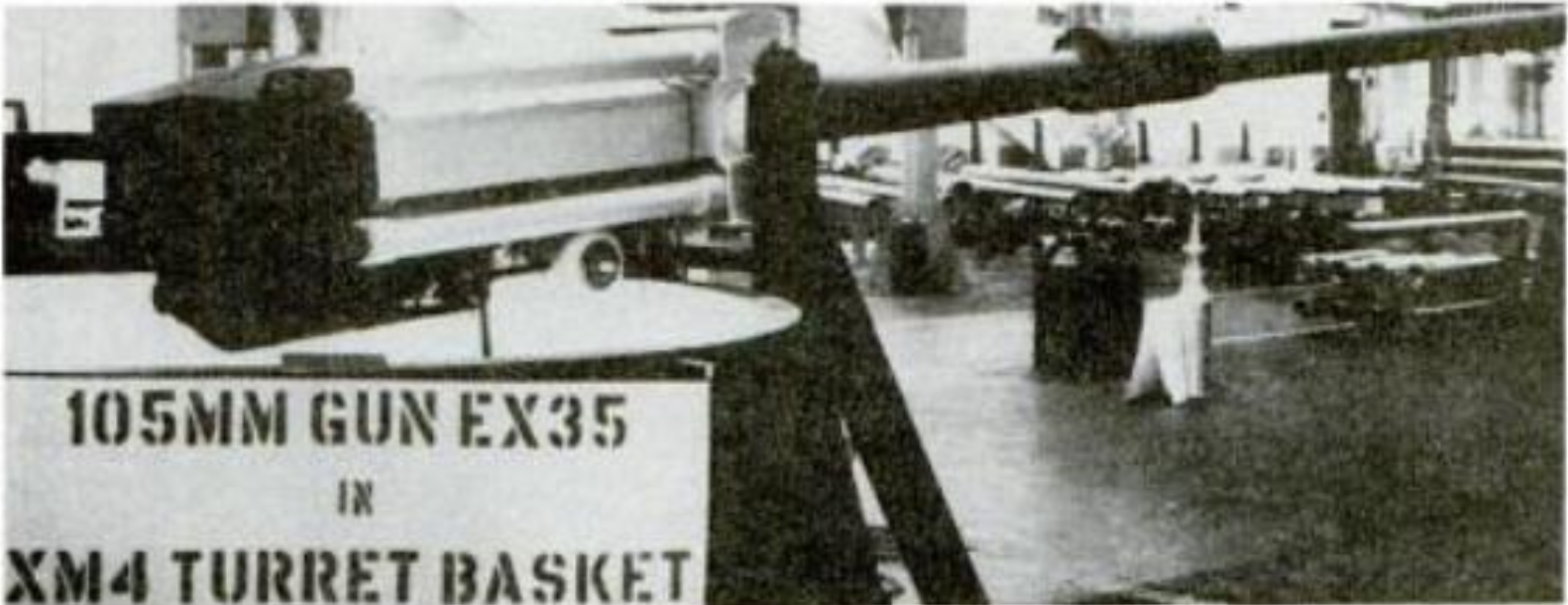
A prototype EX35 gun is mounted in the FMC XM4 Armored Gun System (CCVL) turret basket c. 1984

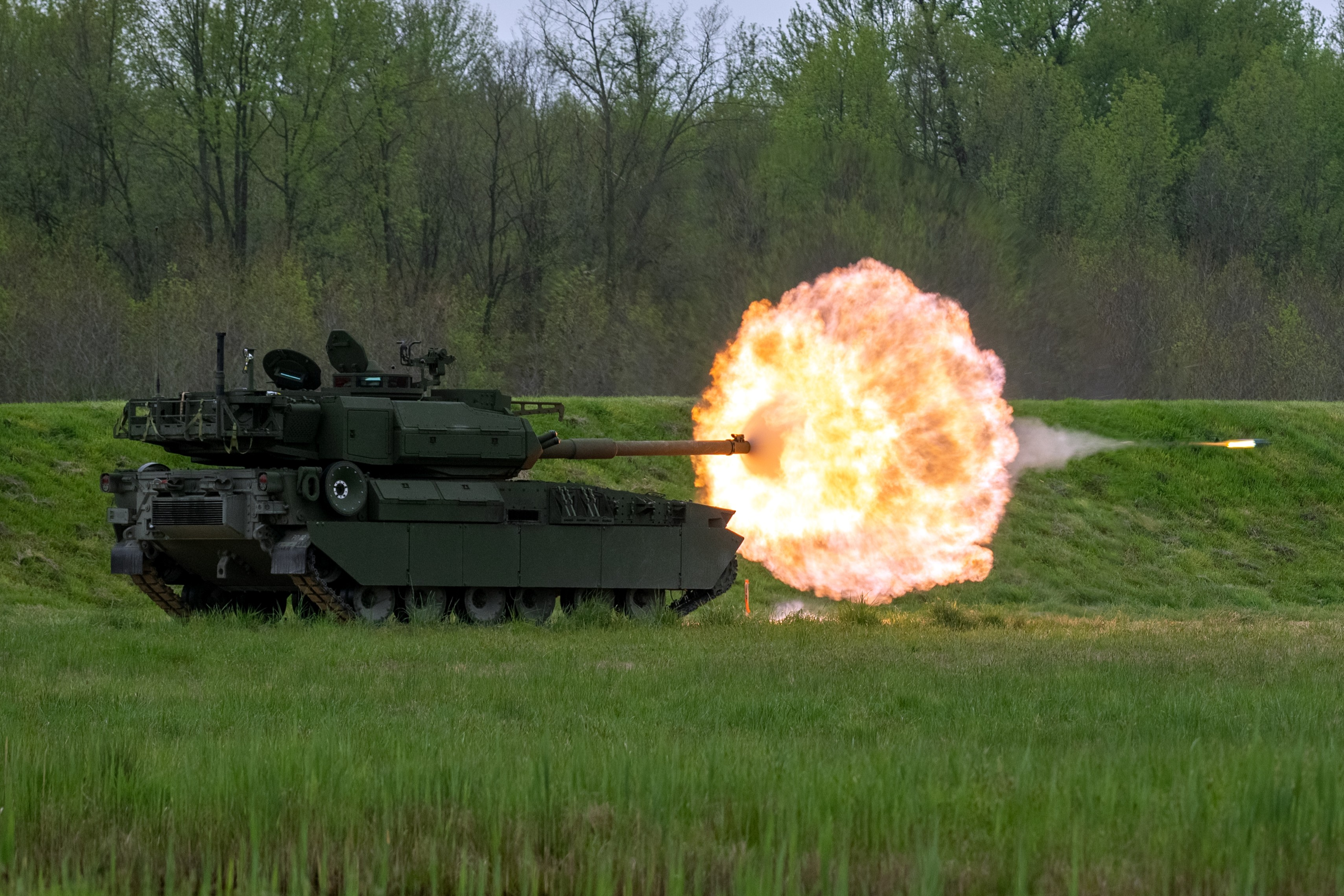
Firing the M35 gun of a M10 Booker in 2024

The M35, known during development as the EX35 and XM35, is an American 105 mm caliber low-recoil tank gun.

The M35 was developed for the U.S. Army and U.S. Marine Corps Mobile Protected Gun Program of the early 1980s. It was integrated onto the Marine Corps LAV-105, and the U.S. Army's M8 Armored Gun System and M10 Booker vehicles.

== History ==
The M35 was designed and developed by Benét Laboratories, Watervliet Arsenal in 1983 for the Mobile Protected Gun Program, a joint U.S. Marine Corps and U.S. Army program. The program was canceled the following year, however the Large Caliber Weapon System Laboratory (LCWSL) mounted the EX35 in an XM4 Armored Gun System (AGS) turret basket during FY1984. LCWSL fired 100 rounds from the gun.

=== Armored Gun System ===
In 1991, the Senate and House Armed Services Committees joined in directing the Army to integrate the turret and Watervliet Arsenal EX35 gun of the LAV-105 with an AGS chassis. This joint project never came to fruition. When the Army began its Armored Gun System (AGS) competition in 1991, the Army agreed to furnish the winning bidder with the EX35 gun.

In 1992, the Army selected FMC's Close Combat Vehicle Light as the winner of the AGS competition. United Defense (created by a merger of FMC and BMY) built six prototypes of the CCVL under the designation XM8, later type-classified as the M8. The Army canceled the AGS in 1996 due to budget concerns.

United Defense proposed the AGS to meet the Army's Interim Armored Vehicle requirement, however the Army instead chose General Motors' proposal, later type classified as the Stryker M1128 mobile gun system armed with the M68A2.

=== M10 Booker ===
In January 2023, an Army report noted unexpectedly "high levels of toxic fumes" from the spent rounds were being vented into the GDLS M10 Booker. The Army's long-term solution is to add a purge system to clear the fumes.

== Design ==
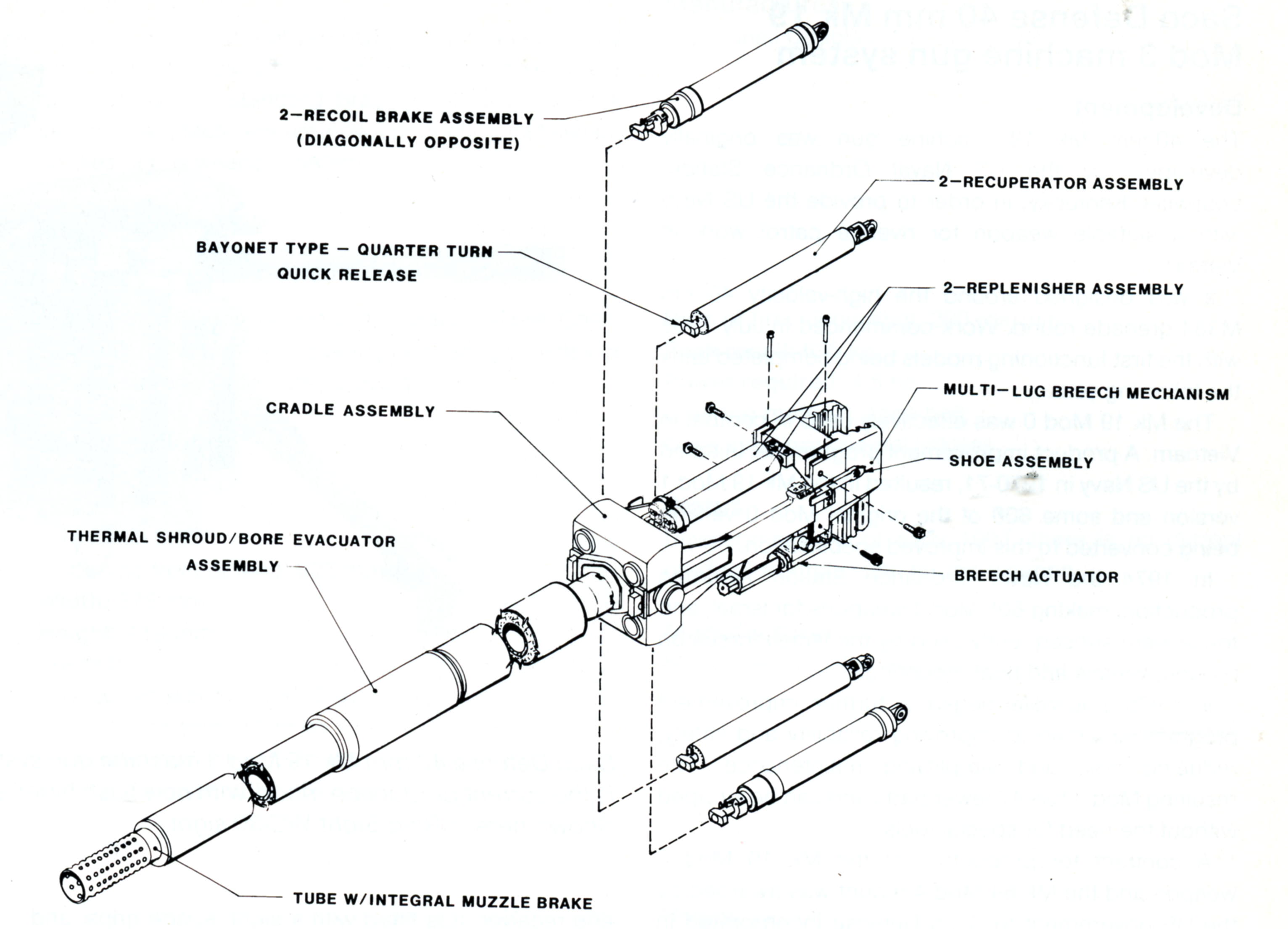
Exploded view of the XM35

The M35 is about 1,800 lb (816 kg) lighter than the M68 used on the M60 tank.

The XM35 has a bore evacuator. The M35 on the BAE Systems XM1302 Mobile Protected Firepower variant uses a bore evacuation fan. This is because the gun, autoloader, and associated components are isolated from the crew.

== Sources ==
- Hunnicutt, Richard Pearce (2015a) [1995]. Sheridan: A History of the American Light Tank. Vol. 2. Battleboro, VT: Echo Point Books & Media. ISBN 978-1-62654-154-2.
