= Robert Booker (politician) =

Michigan politician (1980–2024)

Robert J. Booker

Member of the Tennessee House of Representatives from the Knox County 2nd district
- In office 1967–1972
- Preceded by: Arthur Atkin

Personal details
- Born: April 14, 1935 Knoxville, Tennessee, U.S.
- Died: February 22, 2024 (aged 88) Knoxville, Tennessee, U.S.
- Party: Democratic
- Education: Knoxville College (BEd, 1962)
- Occupation: Historian, politician, writer

Robert J. Booker (April 14, 1935 – February 22, 2024) was an American historian, politician, and writer. He served in the Tennessee House of Representatives.

== Life and career ==
Robert J. Booker was born in Knoxville, Tennessee, on April 14, 1935. He grew up in the East Knoxville neighborhood known as "The Bottom," and went to Austin-East High School. He served three years in the United States Army and was impressed by the freedoms and absence of segregation he experienced while stationed in France and England.

Following his return to the United States in 1957, he graduated from Knoxville College on a G.I. Bill scholarship. During his time in college he participated in the Civil Rights movement. He organize sit-ins in lunch counters restaurants in downtown Knoxville in 1960. After a month of peaceful protests, the same lunch counters were desegregated.

He later taught French at Howard High School in Chattanooga. Booker was the first African American elected to the Tennessee State Legislature from Knox County's 2nd District, and he served three terms.

Booker died on February 22, 2024, at the age of 88.

== Bibliography ==
- Two Hundred Years of Black Culture in Knoxville, Tennessee 1791–1991 (1993)
- And There Was Light!; The 120 Year History of Knoxville College (1994)
- The Heat of a Red Summer; An Encyclopedia: The Experiences of Black People in Knoxville, Tennessee 1844-1974 (2001)
- From the Bottom Up!
- An Encyclopedia: Experiences of Black People in Knoxville, Tennessee, 1844–1974 (2017)
