= General Dynamics Land Systems =

Manufacturer of military vehicles

- Type: Subsidiary
- Industry: Defense
- Founded: March 7, 1982; 44 years ago
- Headquarters: Sterling Heights, Michigan, U.S.
- Area served: Worldwide
- Products: Defense
- Parent: General Dynamics
- Website: www.gdls.com

General Dynamics Land Systems (GDLS) is an American manufacturer of military vehicles, including tanks and light Armoured fighting vehicles. The company is based in Sterling Heights, Michigan, and is a subsidiary of General Dynamics.

It was originally established in 1982 following the acquisition of Chrysler Defense.

GDLS is known for developing and manufacturing vehicles such as the M1 Abrams tank, Stryker, and LAV 6.

== History ==
In February 1982, Chrysler announced the sale of Chrysler Defense, its profitable defense subsidiary, to General Dynamics for US$348.5 million. The sale was completed in March 1982 for the revised figure of US$336.1 million and renamed General Dynamics Land Systems. Under this newly formed division, General Dynamics would take over production of the M60 and M1 tanks for the United States Army.

In 1985, 3 years after the sale from Chrysler, General Dynamics production plants in Ohio, Michigan and Pennsylvania went on strike. Members of these plants were part of the United Automobile Workers union. The strike was primarily around wage increases.

On April 11, 2024, the Chinese Foreign Ministry announced sanctions on the company due to its arms sales to Taiwan. On March 4, 2025, the Chinese Ministry of Commerce placed 15 U.S. entities (including General Dynamics Land Systems) on its export control list, barring the export of dual-use commodities to that business.

=== General Dynamics Land Systems Australia ===
General Dynamics Land Systems–Australia was established in 2000 as a subsidiary to support the production of ASLAV. GDLS-A now provides engineering, manufacturing, systems integration, upgrade and fleet management services for GDLS Armoured Fighting Vehicles in the Asia Pacific region. In Australia this includes the ADF's ASLAV Light Armoured Vehicles and M1A1 Main Battle Tanks, supported under a Through Life Support Contract awarded in June 2011.

GDLS-A reports operationally to General Dynamics Land Systems–Canada (GDLS-C).

GDLS-A was established in October 2000 as General Motors Defence Australia. General Motors Defense operations worldwide were sold to General Dynamics Land Systems in March 2003. GDLS-A was established as a result of GDLS-C being awarded the Phase III contract to provide 144 Australian Light Armoured Vehicles (ASLAV) to the Commonwealth of Australia. The contract provided for the manufacture of the LAV-25 turret system in Adelaide and the establishment of a significant Australian supplier base to support manufacturing for GDLS' global supply chain for LAV-25 turrets.

GDLS-A’s primary customer is the Defence Materiel Organisation, Commonwealth of Australia, located in Melbourne, Victoria. Its National Manufacturing and Support Centre is located north of Adelaide in Pooraka. GDLS-A also has Field Service Groups in Darwin and Brisbane, and a Fleet Management Services office in Southbank, Melbourne.

=== General Dynamics Land Systems Canada ===
In 2003, GDLS acquired Steyr-Daimler-Puch Spezialfahrzeug GmbH (SSF), the land defense vehicles unit of Steyr-Daimler-Puch, and General Dynamics Land Systems – Canada (GDLS-C), a subsidiary of General Dynamics based in London, Ontario, purchased General Motors Diesel, GM Defense unit from General Motors. At the time, it produced vehicles such as the LAV-25 and Stryker. The London operation continued in the GM Diesel plant location. SSF merged into the General Dynamics European Land Systems (GDELS) unit.

In 2015, GDLS Canada secured a fourteen-year, $15-billion deal to supply light armoured vehicles to Saudi Arabia. Representatives from Unifor, the plant union, expressed concern that the London facility would suffer financially due to negative publicity surrounding the deal due to human rights concerns within Saudi Arabia. Both Bloc Québécois leader Gilles Duceppe and New Democrat Thomas Mulcair challenged Prime Minister Stephen Harper on the secrecy surrounding military sales to Saudi Arabia. David Perry, senior analyst with the Canadian Defence and Foreign Affairs Institute, argued that secrecy in trade details is part of a pragmatic foreign trade policy necessary for a domestic industry in a global market.

== Manufacturing facilities ==
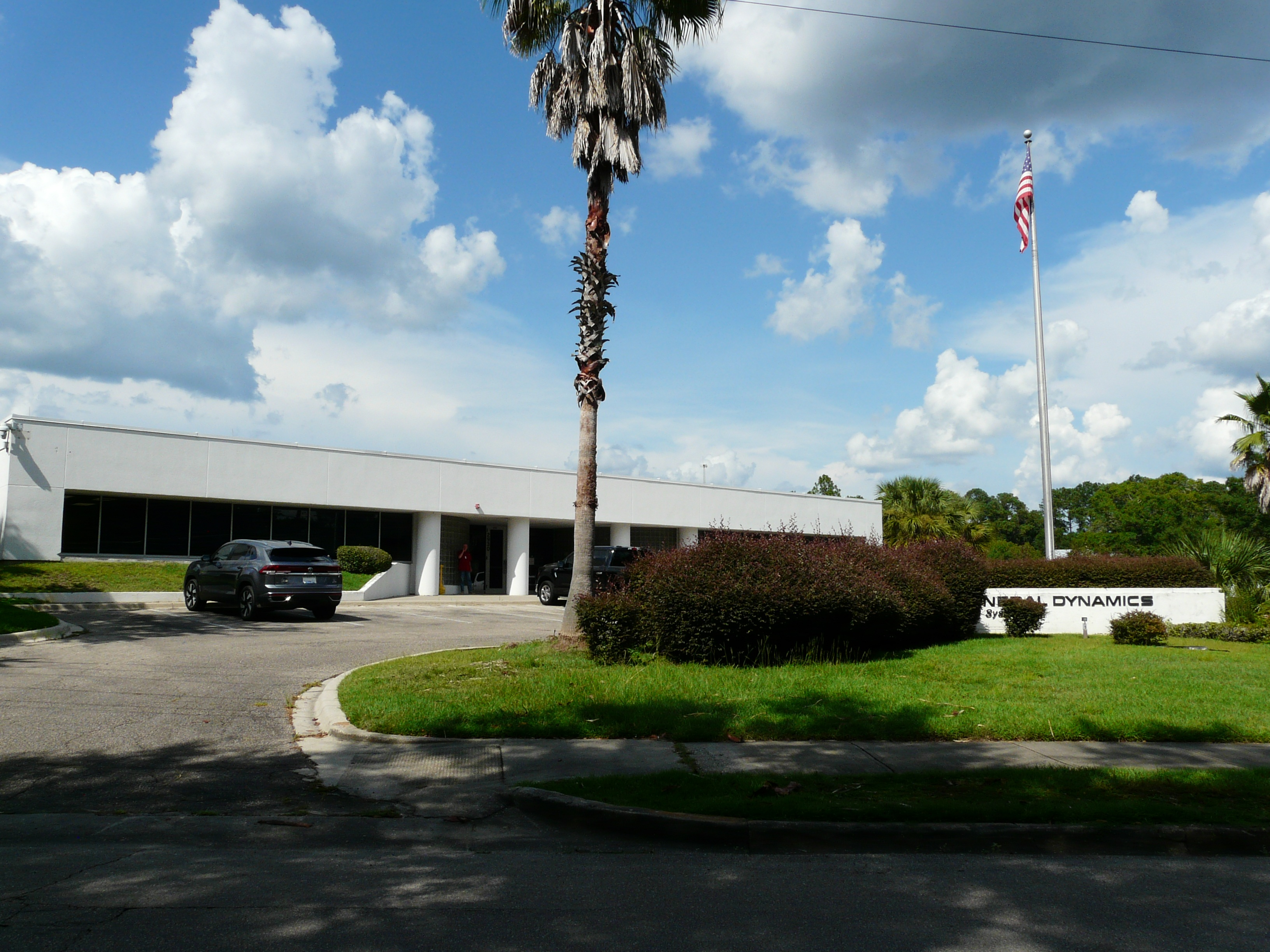
GDLS facility in Tallahassee, Florida

=== United States ===
The division operates the Lima Army Tank Plant and General Dynamics Anniston Operations in Anniston, Alabama, along with smaller operations in Tallahassee, Florida, and Scranton, Pennsylvania. Headquarters are located in Sterling Heights, Michigan. As of 2016, General Dynamics Land Systems employed 6,800 people.

== Vehicles ==
- M1 Abrams, the American main battle tank
- K1 88-Tank, the South Korean main battle tank
- Light Armoured Vehicle, a family of infantry fighting vehicles
- Stryker, a family of eight-wheeled armored fighting vehicles derived from the Canadian LAV III
- Ajax, a family of tracked armoured fighting vehicles being developed for the British Army
- Buffalo, a wheeled mine resistant, ambush protected (MRAP) armored military vehicle
- Cougar, an MRAP and infantry mobility vehicle structured to be resistant to landmines and improvised munitions
- Multi-Utility Tactical Transport (MUTT), currently being trialed by the United States military
- Griffin, a series of armoured fighting vehicles under development and being offered under the United States Army Next Generation Combat Vehicle program
- Mobile Protected Firepower (MPF), a prototype undergoing Soldier Vehicle Assessment (SVA) (cancelled)
- Tracked Robot 10-Ton (TRX), a robotic combat vehicle platform
