= Benét Laboratories =

US Army ordnance facility at Watervliet Arsenal, New York

Coordinates: 42°43′09″N 73°42′35″W

Benét Laboratories, part of the US Army Combat Capabilities Development Command Armaments Center, is the US Army's primary design, development, engineering and production and field support facility for large caliber armament systems, including cannons, mortars, and recoilless rifles. The facility also works on tank gun mounts and turret components and munition handling systems.

It has been providing weapon research, design, and development at the Watervliet Arsenal in upstate New York since 1887, but officially became the Benét Laboratories on 9 May 1962 and in 2012 employed more than 250 workers. It is a part of the Weapons & Software Engineering Center (WSEC), US Army Combat Capabilities Development Command Armaments Center, which is located at Picatinny Arsenal, New Jersey. Laboratory simulations are performed studying gun firing phenomena, and using static and dynamic load testing (up to 5 million lb), as well as environmental testing. It uses a Bruker D8 Advanced X-Ray Diffraction System for some of its testing.

The laboratories are named after the eighth chief of Army ordnance, Brigadier General Stephen Vincent Benét.

== History ==
In 1965, the Benét Laboratories Tech Library was founded.

In 2013, John Askew was the deputy director at Benét Labs. The chief of the Mortars and Recoilless Rifle Branch in 2014 was Wayland Barber. Director of Benét Laboratories in 2015 was Lee Bennett.

In February 2015, the Benét Laboratories developed a 120mm mortar testing system. In April 2015, senior mechanical engineer John P. Snyder became the lead program manager for the MTConnect Student Challenge appointed to Benét Laboratories by the Department of Defence (DOD).

In 2016, the U.S. Army awarded a five year $9.5 million contract to KeyLogic Systems for technical support services at the Watervliet Arsenal Benét Laboratories facility.
