= Robert D. Booker =

United States Army Medal of Honor recipient (1920–1943)

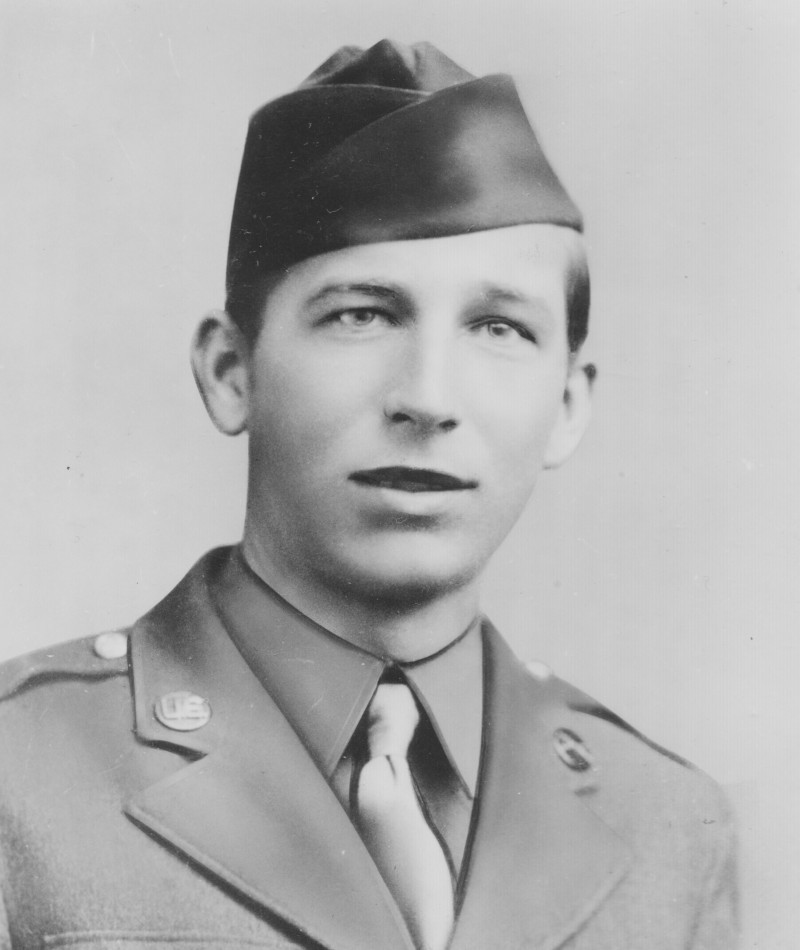
- Booker in uniform
- Born: July 11, 1920; Callaway, Nebraska, United States
- Died: April 9, 1943 (aged 22) near Fondouk, Tunisia
- Military career
- Allegiance: United States of America
- Branch: United States Army
- Service years: 1942–1943
- Rank: Private
- Units: 133rd Infantry Regiment, 34th Infantry Division
- Conflicts: World War II; Tunisian campaign †
- Awards: Medal of Honor (posthumously); Purple Heart (posthumously)

Robert D. Booker (July 11, 1920 – April 9, 1943) was a United States Army soldier and a recipient of the United States military's highest decoration—the Medal of Honor—for his actions in World War II.

== Biography ==
Booker joined the army from his birthplace of Callaway, Nebraska, in June 1942, and by April 9, 1943, was serving as a private in the 133rd Infantry Regiment, 34th Infantry Division. On that day, near Fondouk, Tunisia, he advanced alone across open terrain despite intense hostile fire and began firing on the enemy with his machine gun. After being wounded, he continued to fire until receiving a second, fatal, wound. For these actions, he was posthumously awarded the Medal of Honor along with a Purple Heart a year later, on April 25, 1944.

== Medal of Honor citation ==
Private Booker's official Medal of Honor citation reads:

For conspicuous gallantry and intrepidity at risk of life above and beyond the call of duty in action. On 9 April 1943 in the vicinity of Fondouk, Tunisia, Pvt. Booker, while engaged in action against the enemy, carried a light machinegun and a box of ammunition over 200 yards of open ground. He continued to advance despite the fact that 2 enemy machineguns and several mortars were using him as an individual target. Although enemy artillery also began to register on him, upon reaching his objective he immediately commenced firing. After being wounded he silenced 1 enemy machinegun and was beginning to fire at the other when he received a second mortal wound. With his last remaining strength he encouraged the members of his squad and directed their fire. Pvt. Booker acted without regard for his own safety. His initiative and courage against insurmountable odds are an example of the highest standard of self-sacrifice and fidelity to duty.

== Legacy ==
The M10 Booker, an armored fighting vehicle unveiled by the U.S. Army in June 2023, is named in Booker's honor.

== See also ==
- List of Medal of Honor recipients
- List of Medal of Honor recipients for World War II
