= Capex (disambiguation) =

Capex or capital expenditure is an expenditure where the benefit continues over a long term.

Capex or CAPEX may also refer to:

- Capabilities exercise, US military term
- CAPEX (cooperative), or Kerala State Cashew Workers Apex Industrial Co-operative Society, a cooperative promoting the cashew industry
- CAPEX, a major international philatelic exhibition held in Toronto in 1951, 1978, 1987, 1996, and 2022
- Capex Corporation, a former American software company
