= M73 machine gun =

Machine gun designed for use in NATO tanks

Machine Gun, Caliber 7.62 mm, M219
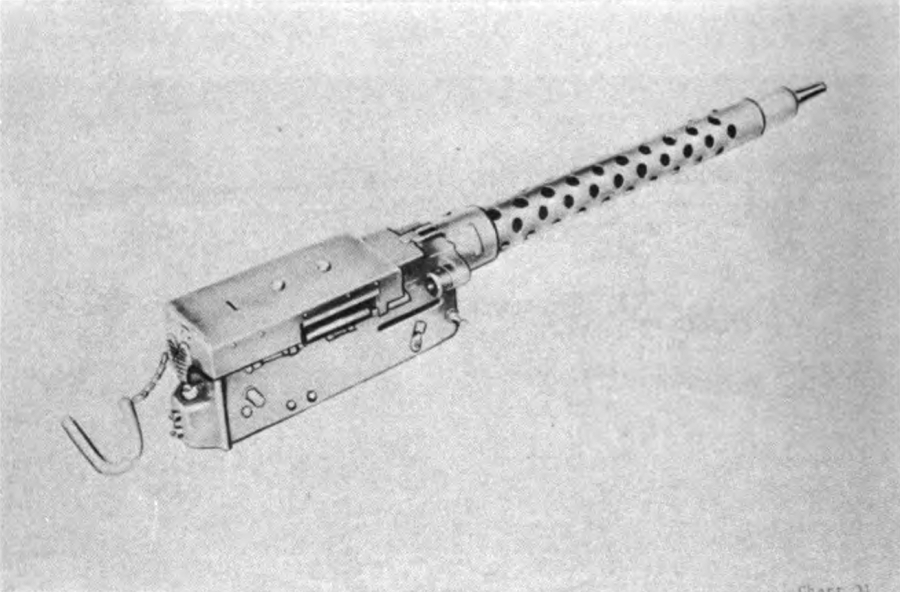
- M219 Machine Gun
- Type: Machine gun
- Place of origin: United States

Service history
- In service: M73: 1959; M73A1: 1970; M219: 1972
- Used by: U.S. and NATO-aligned countries
- Wars: Vietnam War

Production history
- Designed: 1950s
- Produced: 1950s–1970s
- Variants: See Variants

Specifications
- Mass: M73: 31 lb (14.1 kg); M73A1/M219: 29.8 lb (13.5 kg)
- Length: 48 in (1,219.2 mm)
- Barrel length: 24 in (609.6 mm)
- Cartridge: 7.62×51mm NATO
- Action: Recoil-operated/short-recoil operation with gas assist
- Rate of fire: 500–625 round/min
- Muzzle velocity: 2,800 ft/s (853.44 m/s)
- Effective firing range: 984 yd (899.8 m)
- Maximum firing range: 4,000 yd (3,657.6 m)
- Feed system: Belt feed, left or right hand

The M73 and M219 are 7.62 mm NATO caliber machine guns designed for tank use. It is no longer in use by NATO countries. They were used on the M48 Patton and M60 Patton MBT series (including the M728 Combat Engineer Vehicle), as well as the MBT-70 prototype vehicles, and on the M551 Sheridan Armored Reconnaissance/Airborne Assault Vehicle (AR/AAV). They were also used in a twin mount in the turret of the V-100 Commando (M706) light armored car during the Vietnam War.

== Design and development ==
Designed primarily as a coaxial machine gun by the Rock Island Arsenal and produced by General Electric, the M73 was developed as a replacement for the M1919A4E1, M1919A5, and M1919 Browning machine gun#M37 M37 machine guns that continued to serve in the immediate post-World War II environment.

The Machine Gun, 7.62-MM, M73 was officially adopted in 1959. It is an air-cooled, recoil-operated machine gun, but also using cartridge gases to boost recoil. Though designed as a simplified alternative to the M1919 series, it is of almost identical weight. The weapon is fitted with a quick-change barrel, pull-chain charging assembly, and can be made to feed from the left or the right hand side (though the left-hand feed is more common).

An attempt to make the M73 useful as a flexible infantry gun saw the weapon fitted with sights and a pistol grip trigger as the Machine Gun, 7.62-MM, M73C. Equally unpopular, very few of these weapons were produced. Sources claim that it saw limited use in Vietnam.

The M73 suffered from numerous malfunctions and was prone to jamming. An improved M73E1 was eventually developed in 1970 with a simplified ejection system, being type classified as the Machine Gun, 7.62-MM, M73A1. In 1972, it was decided that this weapon was sufficiently different from its predecessor and was redesignated Machine Gun, 7.62-MM, M219. These weapons were eventually replaced by the M60E2 and M240 machine gun, and vehicles still in service using the M73 series were refitted with these weapons.

== Variants ==
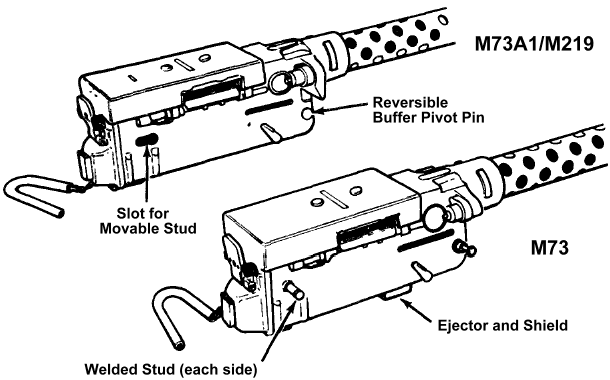
Drawing showing the differences between the M73 and M73A1/M219

=== M73 ===
- Adopted in 1959.

=== M73C ===
- Flexible infantry variant with sights and pistol grip. Concept development. Never entered service.
- Used a special tripod, the XM132. It was a standard M2 mount for the .30 cal. Browning M1919A4 with an adapter to fit the M73C.

=== M73A1/M219 ===
- Developed in 1970 as an improved version with simplified ejection mechanism attempting to reduce chronic jamming.
- Redesignated to M219 in 1972

== See also ==
- M60 machine gun
- M240 machine gun
