= M551 Sheridan =

American light tank

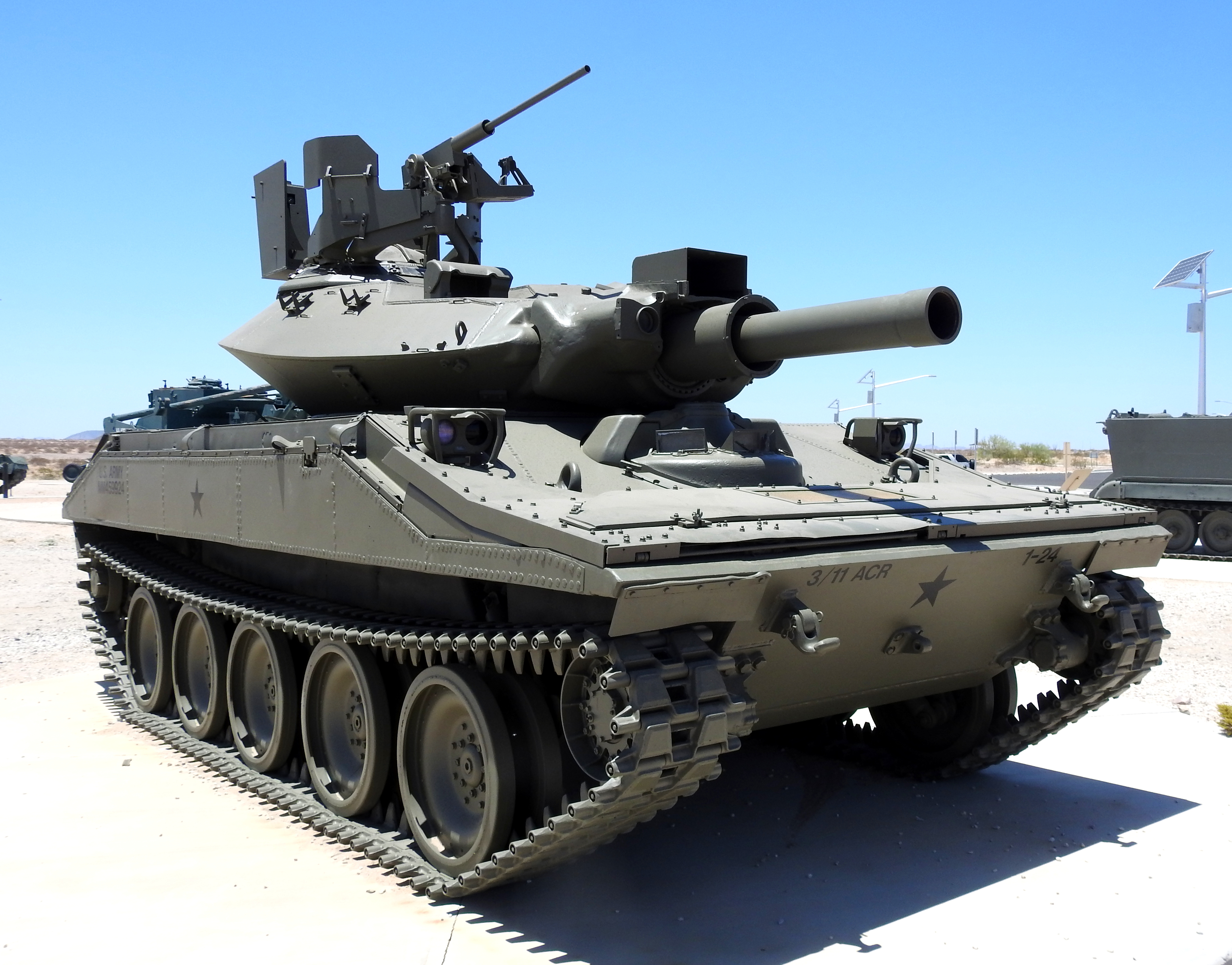
- M551 Sheridan AR/AAV
- Type: Amphibious light tank
- Place of origin: United States

Service history
- In service: 1967–1996
- Wars: Vietnam War; Operation Just Cause; Gulf War: Operation Desert Shield; Operation Desert Storm

Production history
- Designer: General Motors, Cadillac Motor Company
- Designed: 1959–1965
- Manufacturer: Cadillac Motor Company, Cleveland, Ohio
- Produced: 1966–1970
- No. built: 1,662

Specifications (M551A1 Sheridan (TTS))
- Mass: 33,600 lb (15.2 t)
- Length: 248 in (6.3 m)
- Width: 110 in (2.8 m)
- Height: 116 in (2.9 m)
- Crew: 4 (Commander, gunner, loader, driver)
- Elevation: +19.5° / -8°
- Armor: 7039 aluminium alloy hull with Rolled homogeneous steel turret
- Main armament: M81E1 Rifled 152 mm Gun/Launcher; 20 rounds 9 MGM-51 Shillelagh missiles
- Secondary armament: 1× .50 cal (12.7 mm) M2 Browning machine gun with 1,000 rounds 1× .30 cal (7.62 mm) M73/M219 co-axial machine gun (later replaced by the M240C) with 3,000 rounds
- Engine: Detroit Diesel (General Motors) 6V53T, 6 cylinder, turbocharged diesel 300 hp (220 kW) at 2800 rpm
- Power/weight: 17.9 hp/ST (14.7 kW/t)
- Transmission: XTG-250-1A
- Suspension: flat track, Torsion bar suspension
- Ground clearance: 19 in (48.3 cm)
- Operational range: 350 mi (560 km)
- Maximum speed: Road: 43 mph (69 km/h); Swimming: 5.8 km/h (3.6 mph)

The M551 "Sheridan" AR/AAV (Armored Reconnaissance/Airborne Assault Vehicle) is a light tank that was developed by the United States and named after Civil War General Philip Sheridan. It was designed to be landed by parachute and to swim across rivers. It was armed with the technically advanced but troublesome M81/M81 Modified/M81E1 152 mm gun/launcher, which fired both conventional ammunition and the MGM-51 Shillelagh guided anti-tank missile.

The M551 Sheridan entered service with the United States Army in 1967. At the urging of General Creighton Abrams, the U.S. Commander, Military Assistance Command Vietnam, at the time, the M551 was rushed into combat service in South Vietnam in January 1969. Later that year, M551s were deployed to units in Europe and South Korea. The Sheridan saw extensive combat in the Vietnam War from 1969 to 1973. However, problems with the platform became evident, particularly its poor survivability and reliability.

Based on its experiences in Vietnam, the Army realized the shortcomings of the Sheridan, and after the war ended, began to eliminate the vehicle from its units in 1979. A modest fleet of vehicles remained in the 82nd Airborne Division and the National Guard. Various improvement programs were successfully undertaken to improve the Sheridan's reliability. Problems persisted with the 152 mm gun/launcher, and various efforts explored to replace it with a more conventional model. The Sheridan went on to serve in the invasion of Panama and the Gulf War. The Army sought to replace the Sheridan with the M8 Armored Gun System, but this was canceled in 1996, late in its development. The Sheridan was retired without a designated replacement in 1996. The Army acquired the M1128 mobile gun system to fulfill a similar requirement, but this was retired in 2022 due to operational issues and rising maintenance costs. The Army's last known light tank acquisition program was the Mobile Protected Firepower (MPF) also known as the M10 Booker, which was canceled in 2025.

A large number of Sheridans were retained in service at the National Training Center (NTC) at Fort Irwin, California and as Armor Officer Basic training at Armor Training Center, then located at Fort Knox, Kentucky. They worked as simulated Soviet armored opposition force (OPFOR) to train U.S. military units on simulated tank-on-tank armored combat to test on combat effectiveness in a desert environment. They were retired from the NTC in 2003.

== Development ==
In the immediate post-World War II era, the U.S. Army introduced the M41 Walker Bulldog into service to fill the role of a light tank. The lifespan of the M41 was fairly short. At 25 tons it was considered too heavy to be a true light tank, and had a rather short cruising range. Plans were started to build an even lighter replacement mounting the same gun, the T71 and T92. The T92 appeared to be the more promising of the two. As the prototypes were entering testing, information about the new Soviet PT-76 light tank became available. The PT-76 was amphibious, and soon there were demands that any U.S. light tank should be able to swim as well. The T92 could not be easily refitted for this role, so the Army canceled the program in 1958.

In January 1959, the first concept studies were initiated for the armored reconnaissance/airborne assault vehicle that would replace both the M41 and M56 Scorpion self-propelled gun. By October 1959, 12 proposals had been received by the Ordnance Tank Automotive Command. Two proposals were downselected in December: One from Cadillac Motor Car Division of General Motors Corporation, and a joint venture of AAI Corporation and Allis-Chalmers Manufacturing Company. Mockups of both proposals were evaluated in May 1960.

The AAI candidate had three crewmen, and weighed the closest to the 10-ton weight limit specified in the requirements. The Cadillac design was only slightly heavier, with four crew. The four-man turret of the Cadillac proposal was considered more effective than the three-man turret proposed by AAI. The weight limit was reset at 15 tons. In June 1960, Cadillac Motor Car Division signed a contract to develop their concept further, which was designated as the AR/AAV XM551. In August 1961, the Secretary of the Army approved the name "Sheridan," after Major General Philip Sheridan.

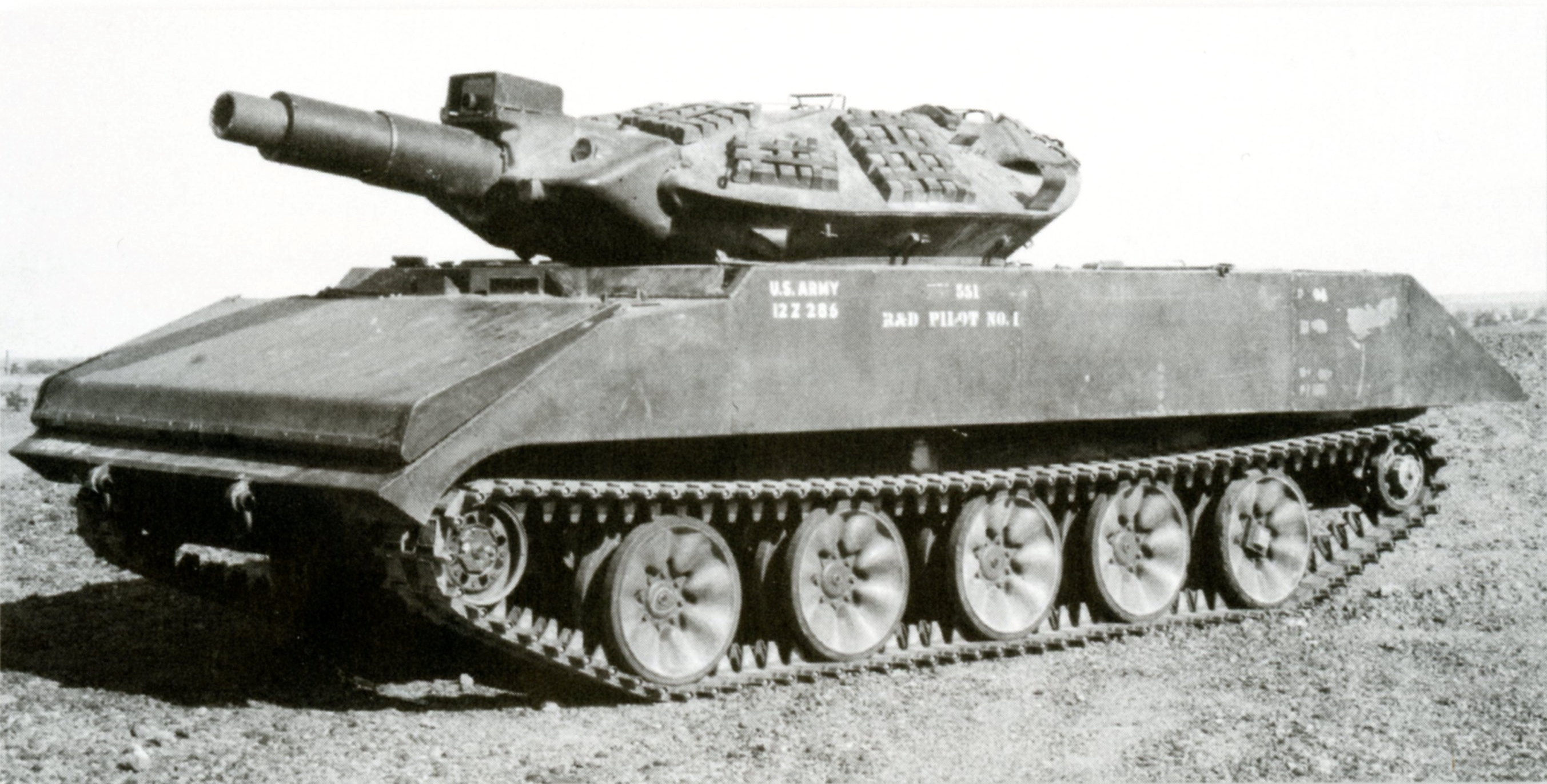
XM551, pilot #1

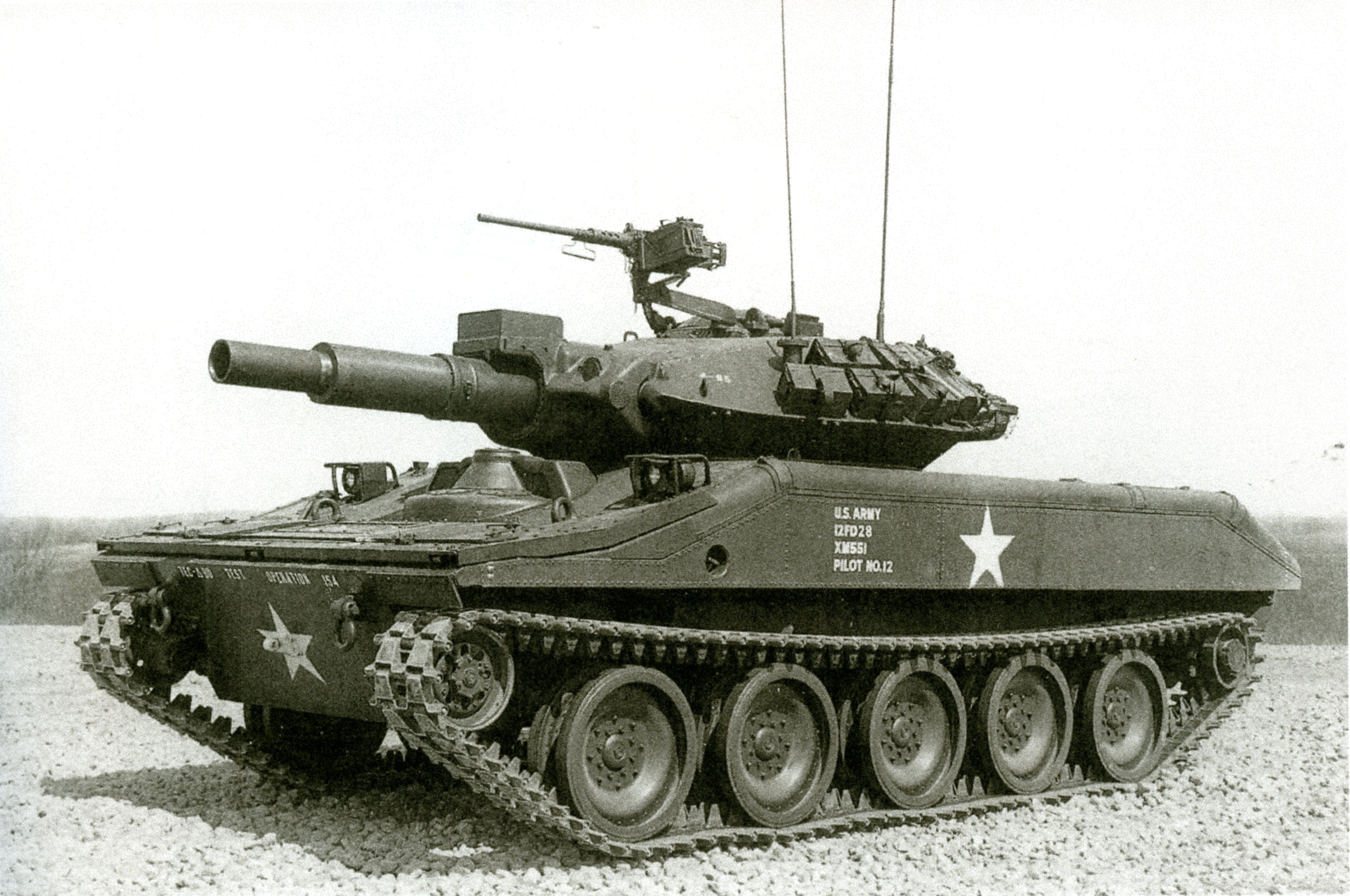
XM551, pilot #12

A test bed underwent operations at Cleveland Tank Plant in December 1961. The decision to use the 152 mm caliber XM81 gun-launcher instead of a more conventional gun was driven by the desire to save weight. The XM81 weighed about half as much as the 105 mm caliber M68, and could fire both conventional and missile rounds. Testing of the XM81 began at Erie Army Depot in late 1961.

By 1962, the Army realized that the MGM-51 Shillelagh missile system would not immediately be ready for the Sheridan, and so considered several alternative gun systems. These including conventional 76 mm, 90 mm and 105 mm options, as well as missile systems such as ENTAC and TOW. In March 1967, a 105 mm howitzer XM103E7 and then a 76 mm gun was installed in the turret of an M551 at Rock Island Arsenal. Neither configuration was adopted. The Army ultimately decided to arm the Sheridan with just 152 mm conventional rounds until the Shillelagh was more mature.

The first of 12 pilots was delivered in June 1962. Pilots 1–3 comprised the first generation. With the second-generation pilots 4–6, the band track was replaced with single-pin, link type tracks. An XM551 test bed turret with gun-launcher was mated to an M41 chassis, which began firing tests in August 1962 at Aberdeen Proving Ground. The third generation of pilots, starting with pilot 7, eliminated the water jet propulsion. Pilots 9–11 were delivered in 1964, and pilot 12 was delivered in February 1965.

In the 1960s the Army was also developing the MBT-70 main battle tank with West Germany. The U.S. Army no longer used the heavy, medium, and light tank classifications. In 1960, with the deactivation of its last heavy tank battalion (which used the M103 heavy tank), and the fielding of the new M60 series tank, the U.S. Army had adopted a main battle tank (MBT) doctrine; a single tank filling all combat roles. The U.S. Army still retained the M41 Walker Bulldog light tank in the Army National Guard, but other than the units undergoing the transitional process, the regular army consisted of MBTs. Fearing Congress would balk at funding two developmental tank programs, the Army chose to designate the Sheridan as an armored reconnaissance vehicle rather than a light tank. The Army also believed "tank" too much evoked the main battle tank, a different role altogether, so the new project was instead officially classified as an "Armored Reconnaissance/Airborne Assault Vehicle."

== Production ==
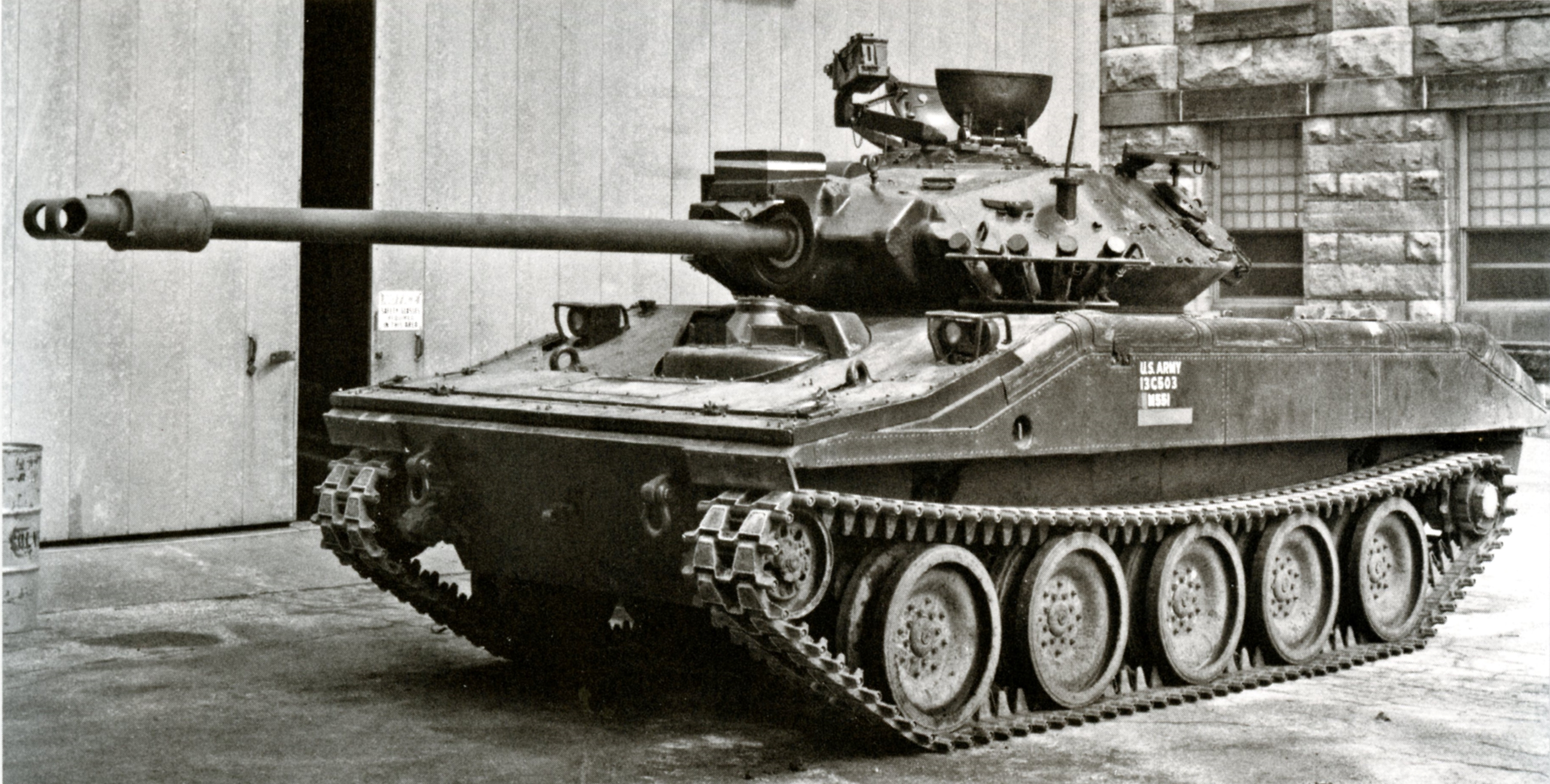
A 76 mm gun is installed on an M551 at Rock Island Arsenal, March 1967

In April 1965 the Army awarded a four-year $114.5 million contract to the Allison division of General Motors (GM) for the production of the M109 howitzer and the XM551 General Sheridan. Limited production was approved in May, and then classified as "Standard A" in May 1966. Production took place at the Cleveland Army Tank Automotive Plant. The first two production units were delivered to the Army in July. During development, the Marine Corps evaluated the Sheridan as a possible replacement for the M50 Ontos. The Corps determined that the Sheridan would be too costly.

The Sheridan entered service in June 1967 with 1st Battalion, 63rd Armor Regiment at Fort Riley. 2,426 Sheridans were planned. In the end, 1,662 Sheridans were built between 1966 and November 1970. The total cost of the M551 program was $1.3 billion.

The M81 gun had problems with cracks developing near the breech after repeated firing, a problem that was later tracked to the "key" on the missiles that ran in a slot cut into the barrel. Most field units were modified to help address the problem, but later the modified M81E1 was introduced with a shallower slot, along with a matching modification to the missile, that cured the problem.

In March 1969, after the Army invoked secrecy in declining to disclose program costs, a Government Accounting Office (GAO) official said that development costs had reached $1.3 billion. Congressman Samuel S. Stratton criticized Army officials for the program's high costs, and accused officials of concealing cost figures to cover up for their own "bumbling ineptness". A GAO report leaked in May 1969 revealed the Army had fast-tracked the program to avoid budgetary scrutiny, despite indications by May 1966 that the tank's caseless ammunition was prone to cooking off. The problem had since then been resolved by a compressed-air system that forced hot ammunition residue from the breech, the Army told Congress. The Army said the Sheridan had performed well enough that it was planning to send hundreds more. A Congressional report in July 1969 identified $1.2 billion wasted on the M60 and Sheridan. The report attributed several Vietnam War casualties to Sheridan design faults, and said that the tank had been wholly unready for combat there "without extensive and costly retrofits."

In 1971, Frankford Arsenal awarded Hughes Aircraft Corporation a contract to begin producing the AN/VVG-1 laser rangefinder for the M551A1 upgrade.

== Service history ==
=== Vietnam War ===
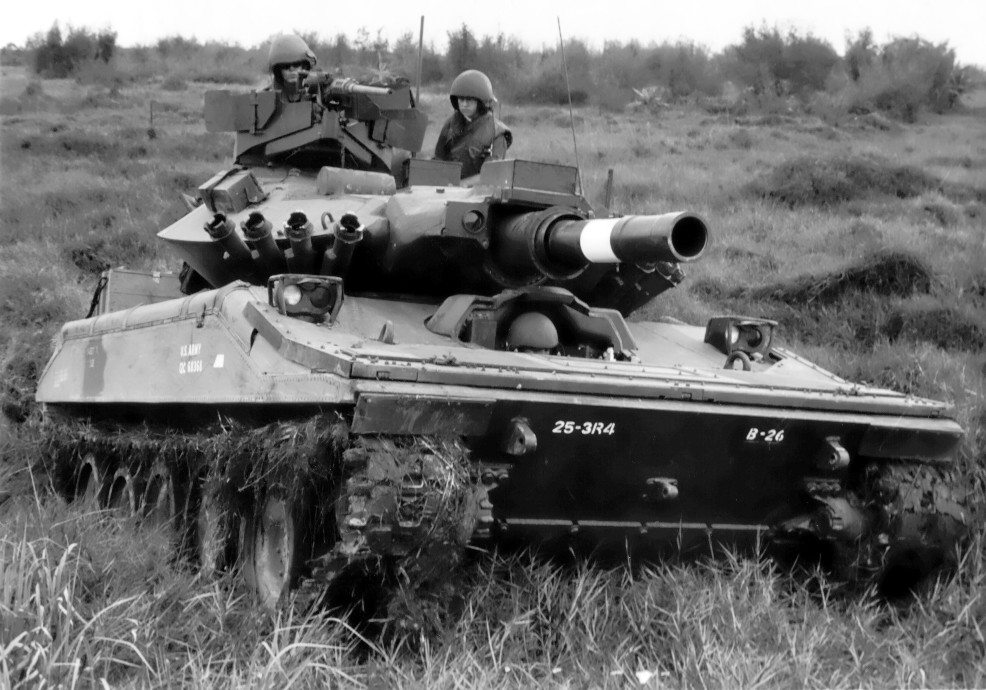
An M551 Sheridan and crew of the 3rd Squadron, 4th Cavalry in the Vietnam War. Note the add-on belly armor

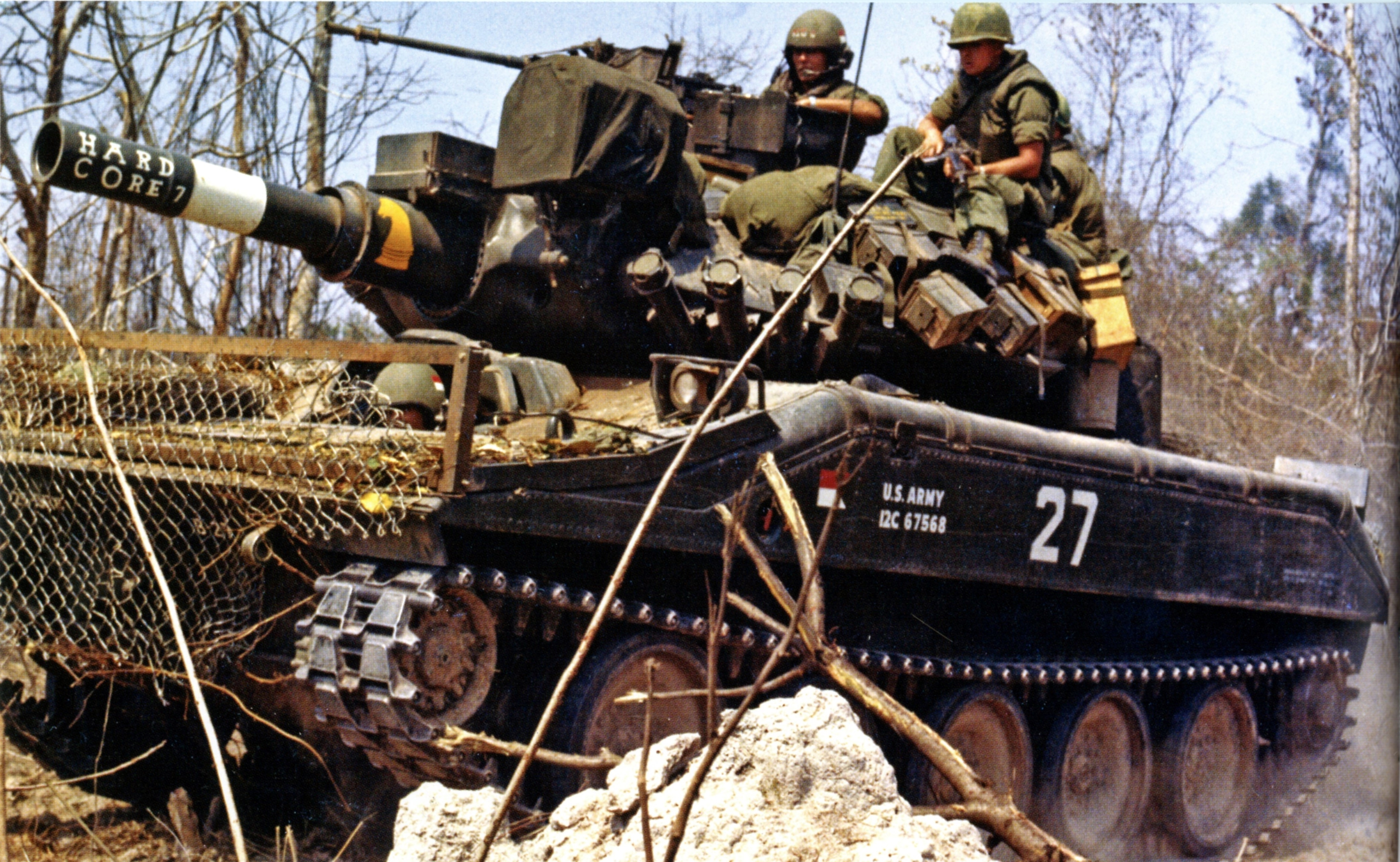
M551 Sheridan of the 3/4th Cavalry, December 1969 (note the anti-RPG screen)

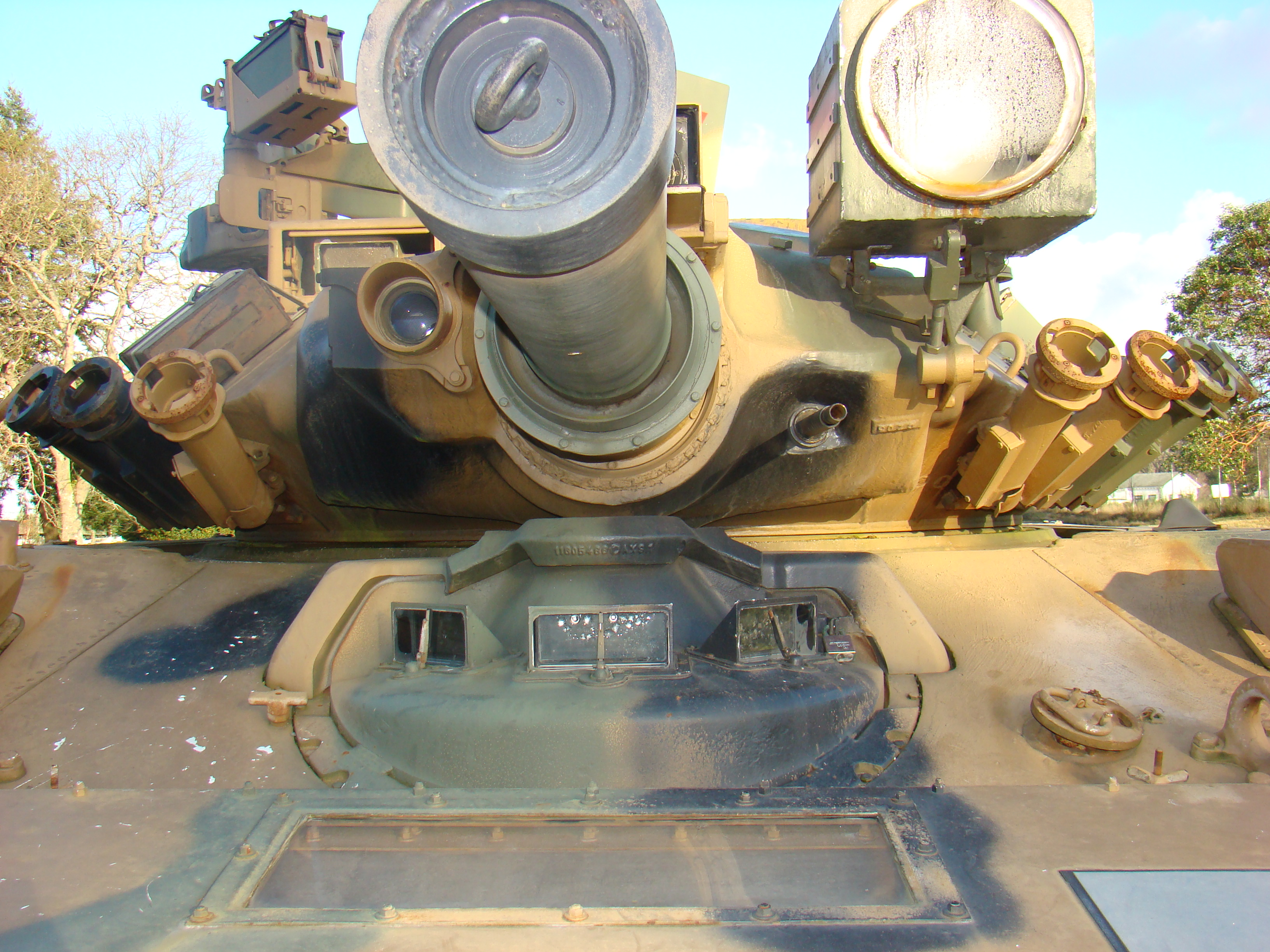
Driver's hatch, front shield with window

The U.S. Army staff in Washington had been recommending since 1966 to the commander of U.S. forces in South Vietnam, General Westmoreland, that the Sheridan should be deployed there. Since the main gun ammunition was not available, he argued that it was simply a $300,000 machine gun platform. By 1968, the new, or soon to be, U.S. commander in South Vietnam, General Creighton Abrams, had been notified that the 152 mm rounds were now available for the Sheridan. However, as General Abrams began to make preparations for the equipping of U.S. cavalry squadrons for the vehicle, the affected squadrons expressed their concerns that the new aluminum tanks were not only highly vulnerable to mines and anti-tank rocket fire, but they would not be as capable of "jungle busting" as the M48A3 medium tanks.

In late 1968, General Abrams met with Colonel George S. Patton IV – the son of World War II General Patton – commander of the 11th Armored Cavalry Regiment (11th ACR), the only full regiment of cavalry in South Vietnam. When Abrams mentioned the cavalry's concerns over the new vehicle, Patton recommended that the Sheridans be combat tested by a divisional cavalry squadron as well as a squadron from his own regiment, as the squadrons had completely different missions.

==== First deployment ====
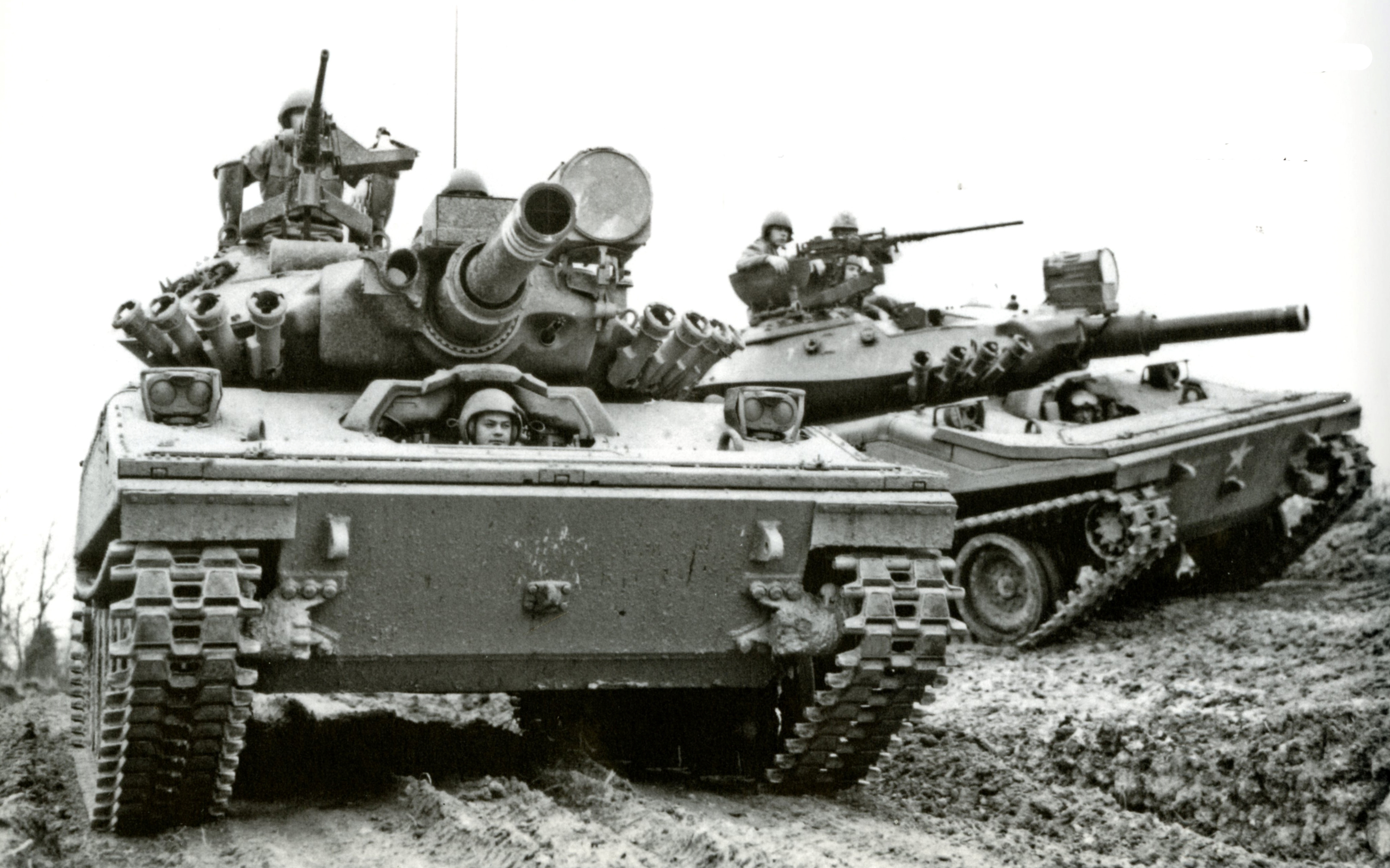
M551 Sheridans of E Troop, 17th Cavalry, 101st Airborne Division at Fort Campbell in April 1972

The first Sheridans arrived in South Vietnam in January 1969 and were accompanied by their factory representatives, instructors and evaluators as the new vehicles were issued to the 3rd Squadron, 4th Cavalry Regiment, and the 1st Squadron of the 11th ACR. By the end of 1970, there were more than 200 Sheridans in South Vietnam. They stayed in the field until the last U.S. armored cavalry unit, the 1st Squadron, 1st Cavalry Regiment prepared for re-deployment back to the United States in April 1972. By the end of its combat debut in 1972, the Sheridan had seen extensive action in the Vietnam War, being assigned to nearly all armored cavalry squadrons involved in that conflict.

In 1969, armored cavalry units (minus the 11th ACR, which retained its M48 tank companies) began replacing their M48 Patton tanks, which were normally transferred to the Army of South Vietnam. The opinions of crews on Vietnam-era M551s were mixed at best and assessments from senior commanders were often negative. This was due largely to the high loss rate of Sheridans and casualty rates among crews. Landmines and RPGs that would damage an M48 Patton tank, tended to destroy a Sheridan and either kill or wound most of its crew.

A 1969 evaluation of the vehicles found that the M551 was employed in reconnaissance, night patrol and road clearing, accumulating 39,455 road miles and 520 combat missions, with a ready rate of 81.3 percent. Despite vulnerability to rockets and mines, it was judged worthy of applying modifications and equipping all cavalry squadrons with the Sheridan.

==== First combat/first losses ====
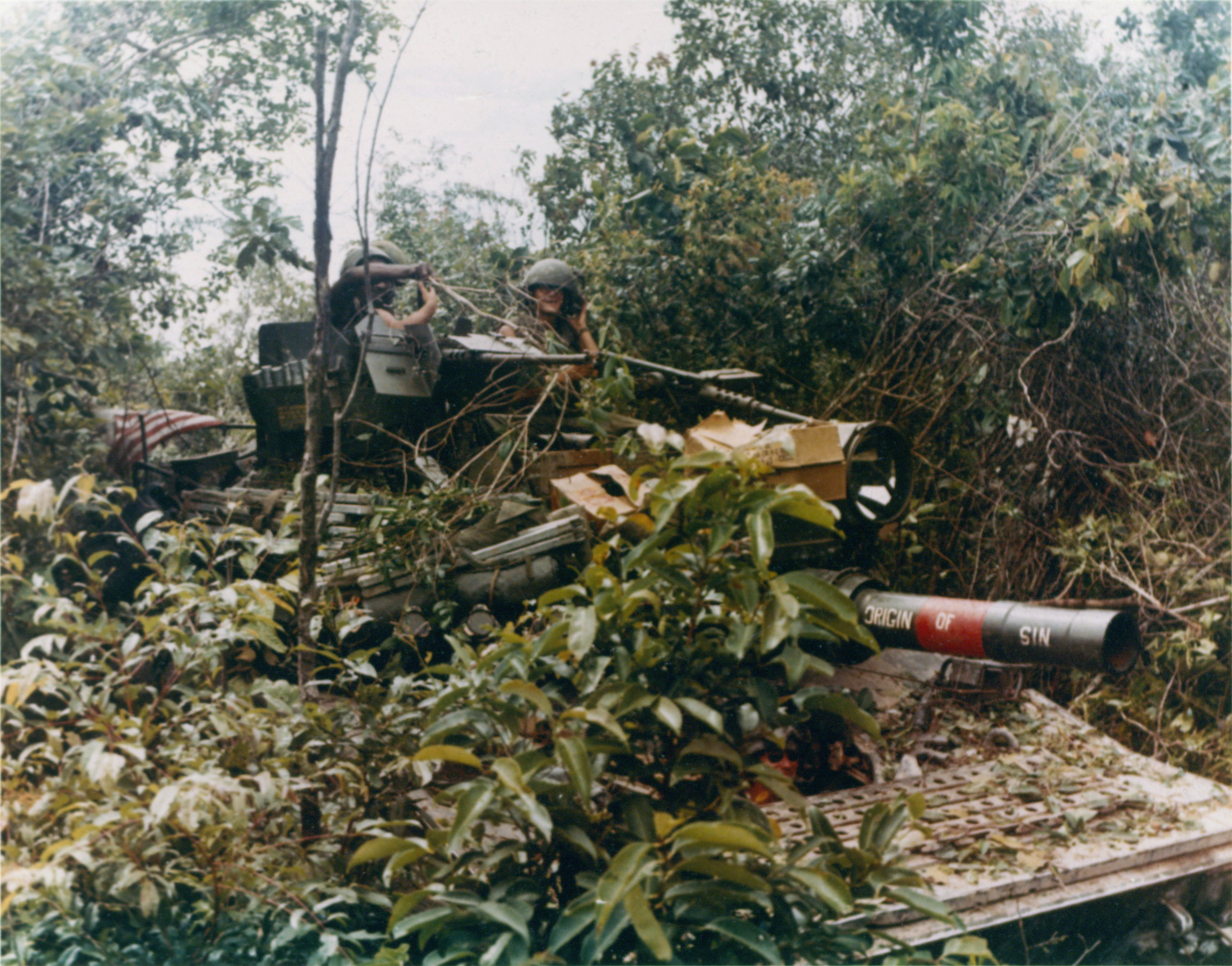
M551 of "A" Troop, 3rd Sqdn, 4th Cav, 25th Inf Div in thick Vietnam jungle, August 1969.

In addition to the problems presented by aluminum construction, the Sheridan had a defect that no other common armored vehicle possessed: it fired combustible-cased 152 mm main gun rounds. These rounds were "fixed", meaning that the projectile was firmly attached to the combustible-cased propellant charge, and if the projectile separated from the combustible-case during loading, which was not uncommon, the crewmen were instructed not to load the round. Sometimes, the combustible-cases and their charges remained on the turret floor due to the emergencies at the time, and additionally, all of the remaining serviceable 152 mm rounds were combustible-cased, and sleeved into a re-usable white nine-ply nylon bag, which was form-fitted to hold the combustible-case portion of the round. The white/silver-colored bag had a strap attached to the bottom, which the loader would grab and pull off prior to gently inserting the round into the breech. Once a mine or RPG-type weapon created an ignition source, smoke and fire became imminent, and it became a matter of Standing Operating Procedure to abandon the tank immediately. On 15 February 1969, just one month after the Sheridan's arrival in South Vietnam, an M551 from the 3/4th Cavalry detonated a 25-pound pressure-activated land mine, which ruptured its hull and ignited the combustible-case charges of the 152 mm rounds, resulting in a secondary explosion that destroyed the tank. In late 1969, nine Sheridans from the 4th Squadron, 12th Cavalry Regiment were fording a river near the DMZ, when three of the M551s triggered mines, completely destroying them. In March 1971, five Sheridans from the 11th ACR were lost in one day to RPG fire; all five vehicles burst into flames and were totally destroyed.

==== Performance ====
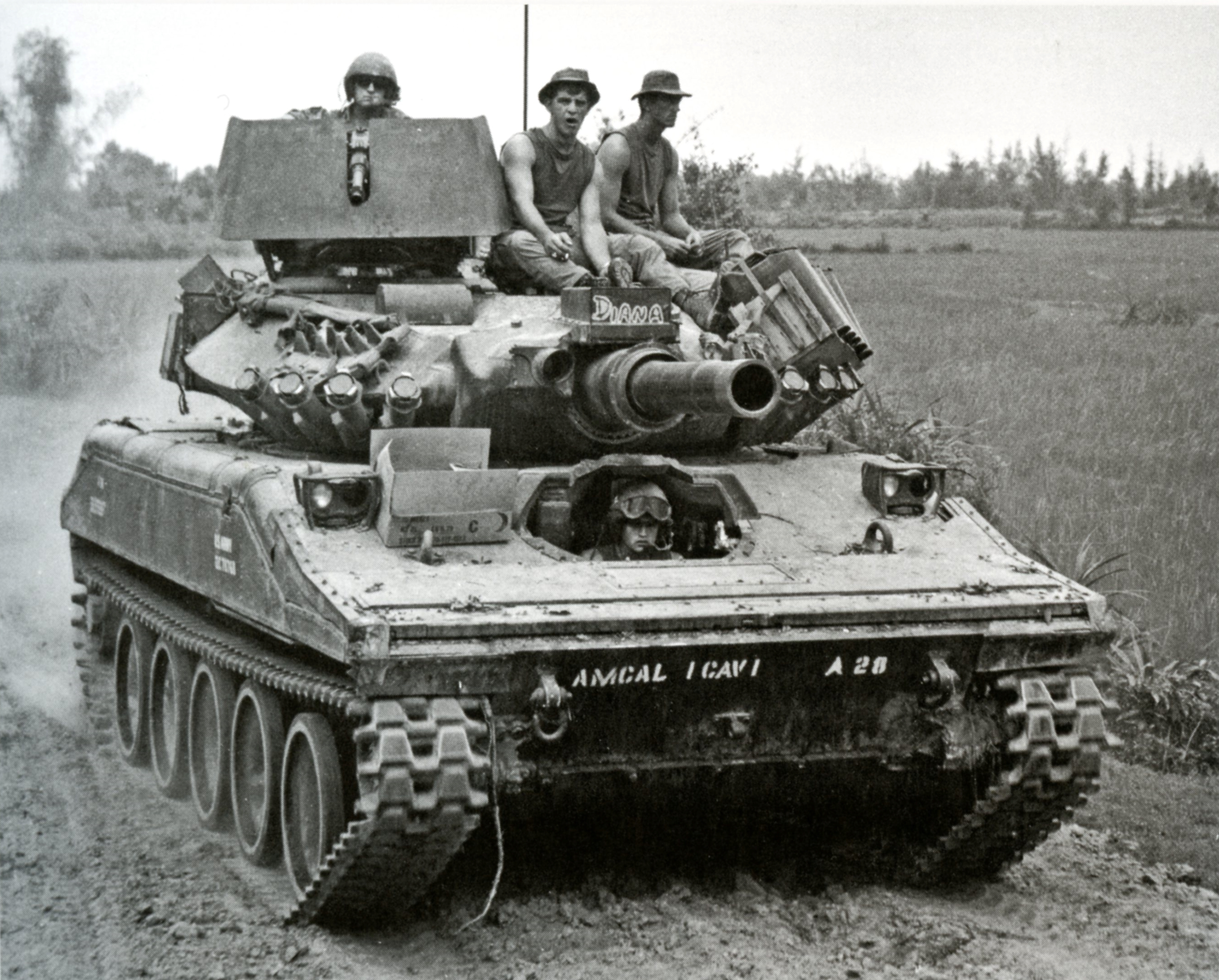
Sheridan of A Troop, 1/1st Cavalry of the Americal Division near Tam Ky in March 1970

Over 200 Sheridans were shipped to Vietnam. The Sheridan was unpopular with American soldiers in Vietnam, mainly because of its perceived vulnerability. While the Sheridan brought superior firepower where it was used in lieu of the M113 ACAV, the Sheridan was a poor substitute for the better armored M48 Patton.

The Sheridan had several advantages: it did not get stuck in the mud as often as the 52-ton M48 did, nor did it throw its tracks off as often. The reliability of the engine system and gun was, however, not fully up to the task. Of 74 M551 sent to Vietnam in February 1969, by May there were recorded 16 serious mechanical faults, 41 failed shots, 140 defective ammunitions and 25 burned engines; the turret itself had 125 electric faults, several recoil system faults and instances of blown up guns. An additional problem was that much of the machine-gun ammunition carried had to be stored outside the turret as internal space was extremely limited.

"Armored Reconnaissance Airborne Assault Vehicle M551" (1969) - de-classified official army training film reel.

Although an average M48 crew could fire as many as seventeen 90 mm rounds during a "mad minute" (60 seconds with all guns firing on command), the Sheridan was known to put out only two 152 mm rounds during the same time frame. The caseless rounds needed air vents to clear the gun tube and breech prior to loading another round, while the M48 breech block opened as the used case was ejected and closed as the new round was shoved in. The faster the loader, the faster the Patton's gun could be fired. For the Sheridan, the loader had to wait for the mechanism. After firing, the loader would have to wait as the breech slowly opened rearward then turned downward. After another instrument indicated that all turret systems were still operational, the loader would gently push the 152 mm fixed round into the breech and watch the breech block slowly rotate upward, then forward into the breech, and then again wait for the lights.

==== Combat field modifications ====
A common field modification was to mount a large steel shield, from the M113 Armored Cavalry Assault Vehicle, around the commander's 50-cal. (12.7 mm) gun, allowing it to be fired with some level of protection. This evolved into an "armored birdcage". Anti-mine armor kits composed of spaced aluminum and steel plates were applied to the hull bottom, although only covering from the front to halfway to the end. Later, steel plates were applied to hull sides above the front road wheels.

Chain-link fencing was applied over the front of the hull in Vietnam to counter rocket-propelled grenades.

=== Post–Vietnam War service ===
The Army began to phase out the Sheridan in 1978, although at the time there was no real replacement. Nevertheless, the 82nd Airborne Division retained them until 1996. The Sheridan was the only "rapidly" air-deployable tank in the inventory. Their units were later upgraded to the M551A1 TTS model, including a thermal sighting system for the commander and gunner.

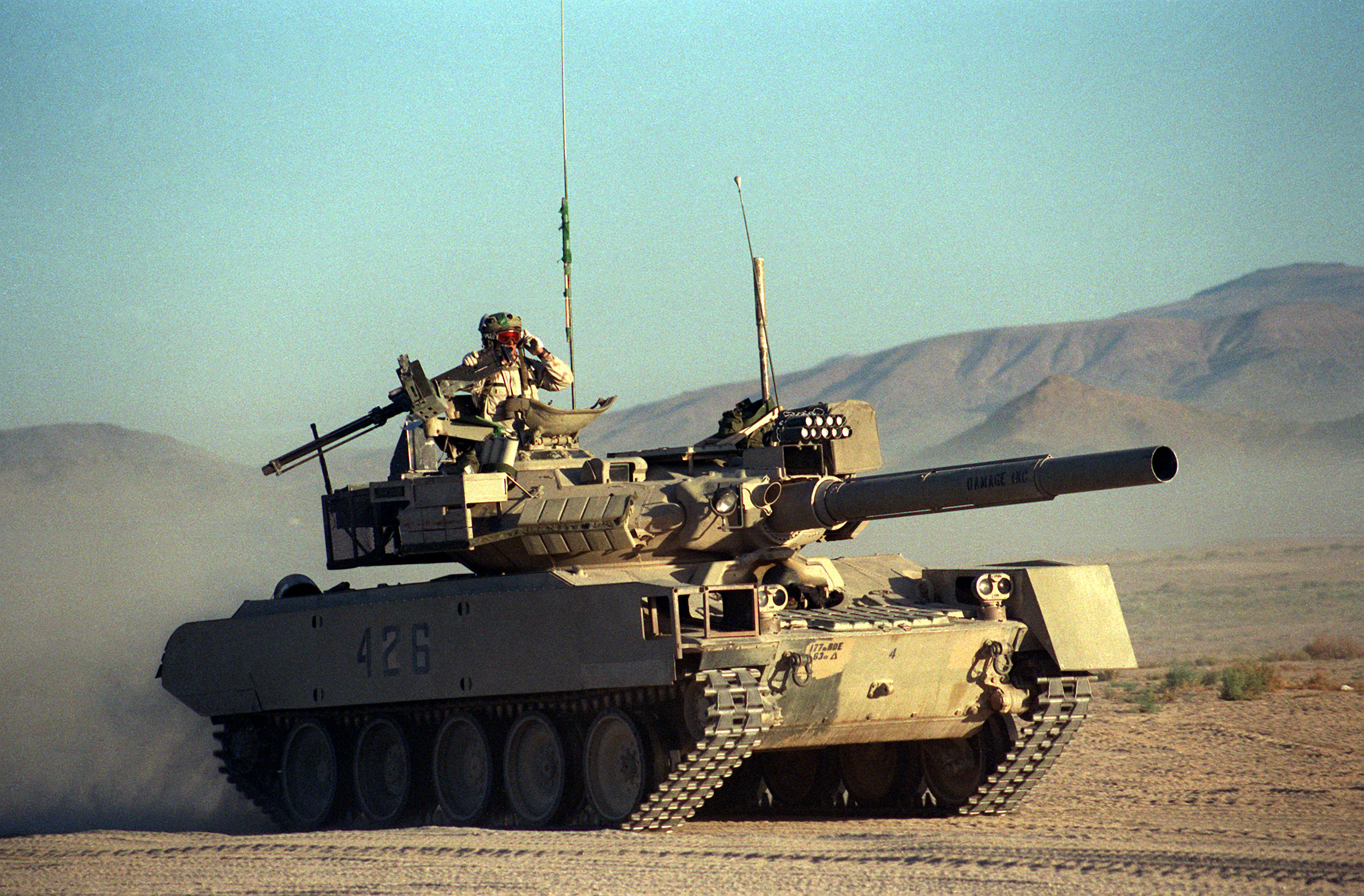
A Sheridan visually modified to represent a T-80 during an exercise in 1993

In the early 1980s, the M551A1 was fitted with a visual modification kit to resemble Warsaw Pact vehicles from Soviet BMP-1, ZSU-23, T-55 to T-80s, at the National Training Center at Fort Irwin, California. These modified vehicles were used in part of the U.S. Army's Soviet opposition forces (OPFOR) by providing realistic ground training to U.S. military units about Soviet combat doctrine in a desert environment. Until their retirement in 2004, these OPFOR vehicles were deployed with the "60th Guards Motor Rifle Division of the Krasnovian Army".

==== Panama ====
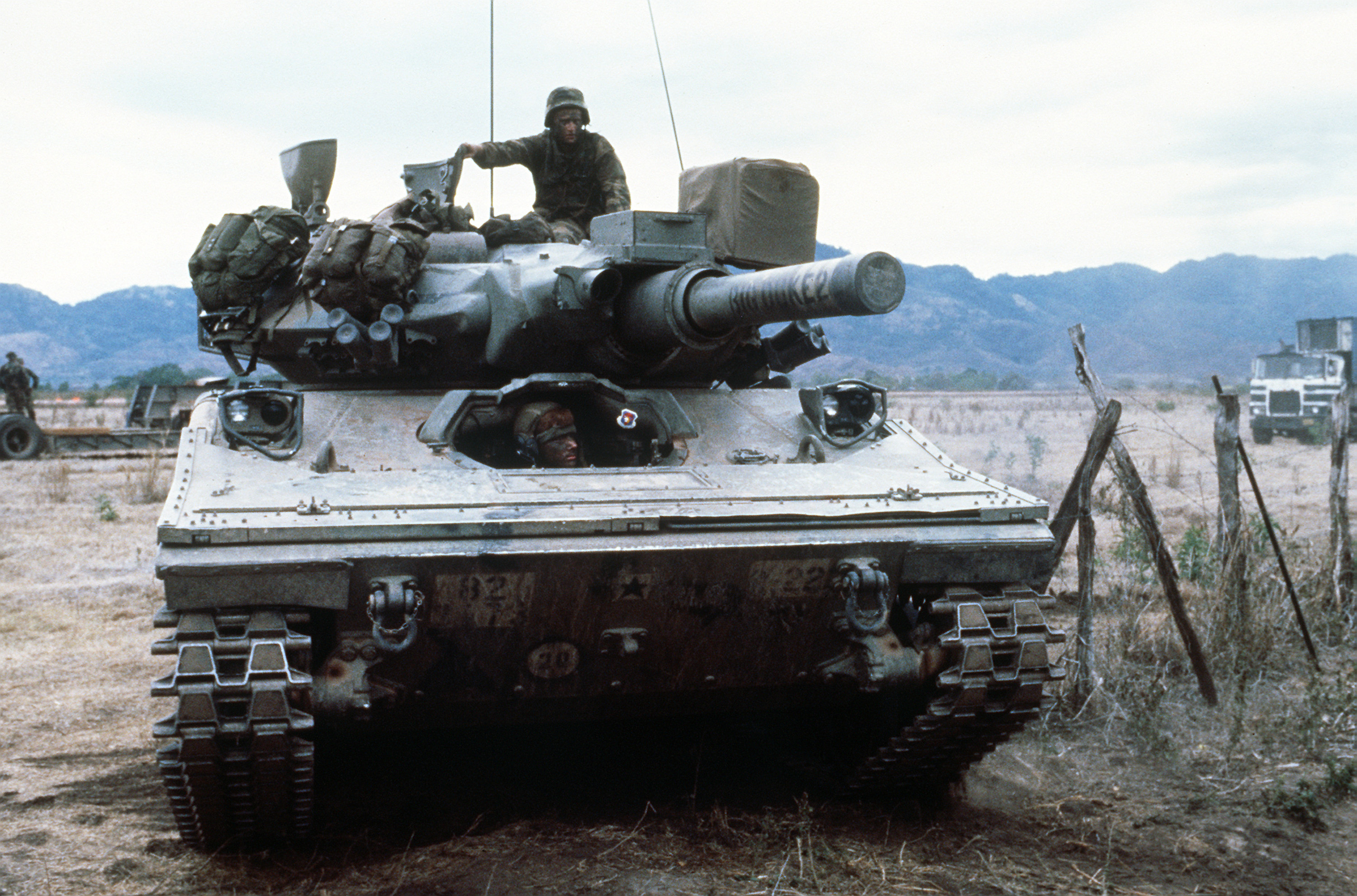
M551A1 Sheridan of the 73rd Armor, 82nd Airborne Division in Honduras during Operation Golden Pheasant in 1988

The Sheridan's only air drop in combat occurred during the United States invasion of Panama (Operation Just Cause) in 1989, when 14 M551s were deployed with C Company, 3/73rd Armor, 82nd Airborne Division. Four M551s were secretly delivered to Howard Air Force Base in Panama aboard a C-5 Galaxy in November 1989, days before the invasion. They were attached to TF Bayonet (193rd Infantry Brigade), and attached down further to TF Gator. These Sheridans took part in the attack on the Comandancia, initially supported by fire from Quarry Heights, and later displacing forward into the city. As part of Team Armor, these Sheridans later provided support to JSOC elements as they secured high-value targets throughout Panama City. The remaining 10 Sheridans were delivered via C-141 low-velocity airdrop (LVAD) to Torrijos-Tocumen Airport some hours after H-hour. One of these was destroyed after its parachutes failed to deploy, while another was damaged. As of 2009, this marked the first and only combat air-drop of tanks in history.

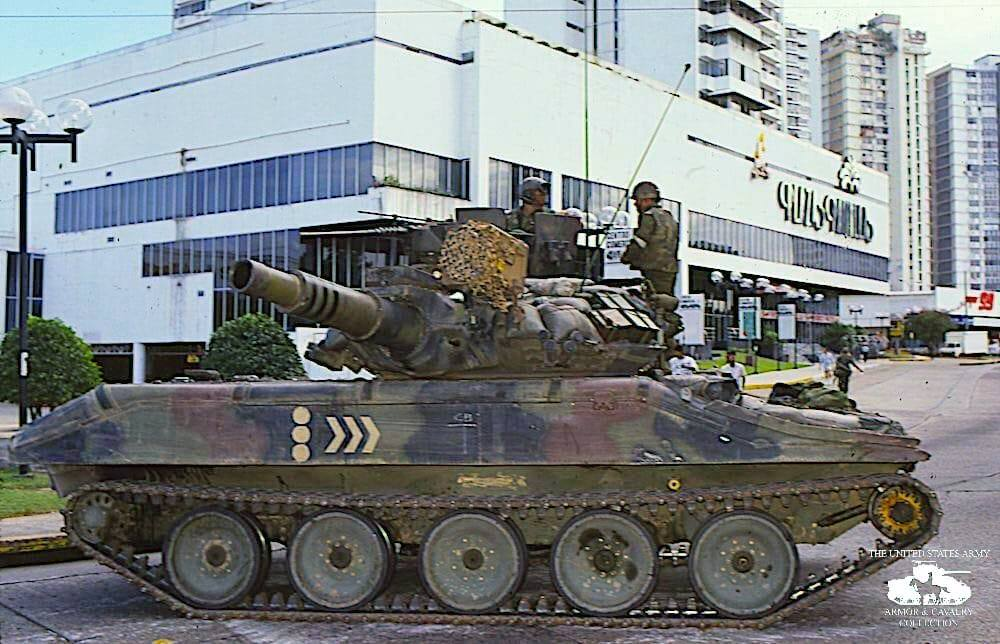
Sheridan in Panama

The Sheridan was praised for its performance in Panama. A U.S. after-action report noted the Sheridan's "extreme psychological effect on enemy forces", who were apparently deterred from firing at U.S. forces reinforced by tanks.

==== Gulf War ====
In the early days of Desert Shield, Sheridans were airlanded in Saudi Arabia before coalition heavy armor arrived by ship. The first Sheridans sent were the M551A1 model. The Army hastily sent 60 M551A1 TTS models with the thermal sight upgrade to replace the older models. The 3/73rd used the Sheridan as part of a flanking force in Operation Desert Storm, and saw tank-on-tank combat. Their role was limited to reconnaissance due to their age and light armor. It is likely that no more than six Shillelagh missiles were fired at Iraqi anti-tank guns or T-55s; this was the only occasion in which Shillelagh missiles were fired in anger, from the inventory of 88,000 missiles produced. Other than some overheating problems in the summer months of the buildup, the Sheridan suffered no mechanical breakdowns in combat and performed extremely well.

=== Australian trials ===
During 1967 and 1968 the Australian Army trialed two Sheridans to determine if the type met a requirement for light armored fighting vehicles to serve with the Royal Australian Armoured Corps newly formed cavalry regiments. The main trials took place in the tropical Innisfail area of north Queensland between January and June 1968. In January 1969 the Minister for the Army announced that Australia would not purchase any Sheridans as the tanks did not meet the Army's requirements. The main shortcoming revealed in the trials concerned the safety of the combustible case. The two Sheridans were returned to the U.S. Army in early 1969, and the Australian Army met its requirement by fitting turrets from Alvis Saladin armored cars to M113 armored personnel carriers.

== Replacement ==
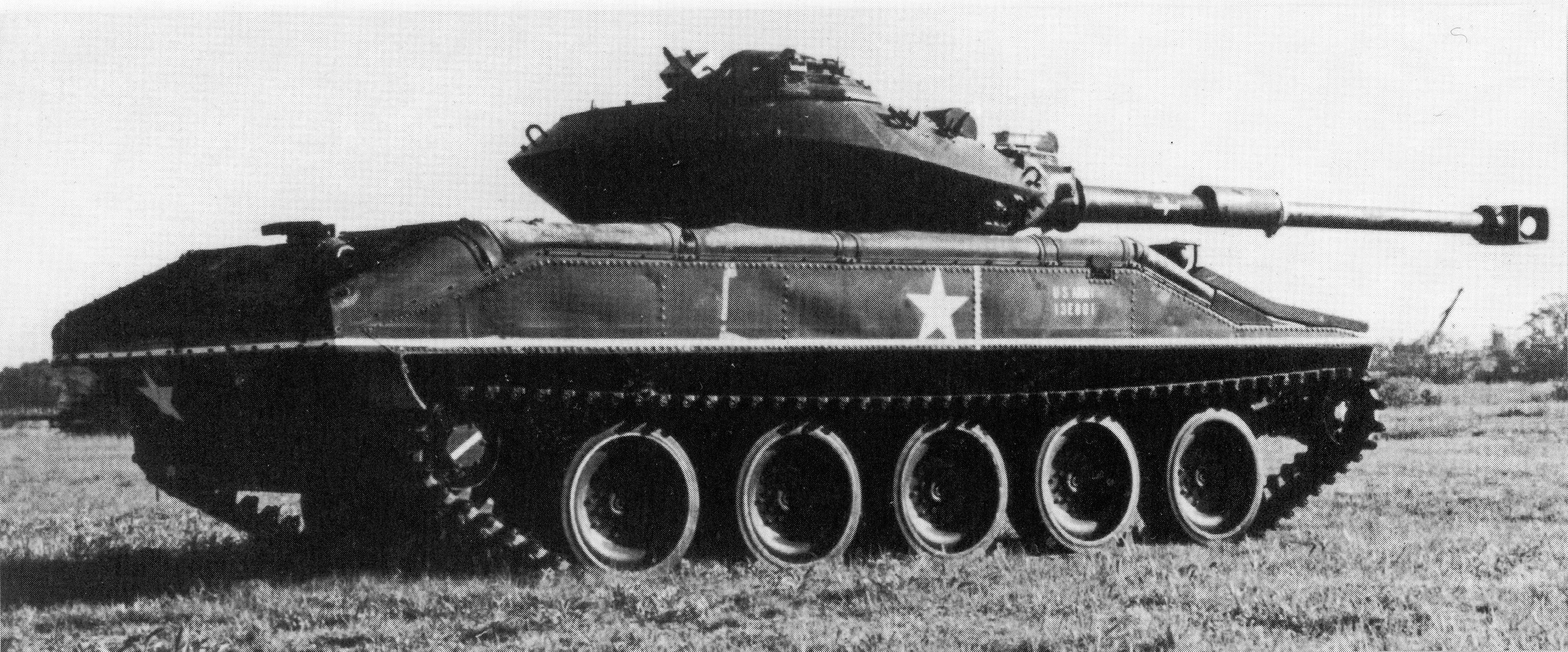
Navy Surface Weapons Center Sheridan mounting a 105 mm caliber gun, circa 1983

In 1977, TRADOC commander General Donn A. Starry met with Army Chief of Staff General Edward C. Meyer to convince him that the service should retire the Sheridan. Starry had commanded the 11th ACR in Vietnam, and knew the vehicle's shortcomings. Starry's arguments prevailed over those of Army Material Command commander General John R. Guthrie, a Sheridan defender, and Meyer agreed the Sheridan would be retired. The Army decided on the M60A1 as the service's interim successor until the M3 Bradley was ready. At the time, 567 Sheridans existed in USAREUR, 535 in the continental U.S., and 41 in the Pacific. The Army began converting units in Europe in 1978, and in the rest of the service by 1980. The Army sustained 140 Sheridans in the 82nd Airborne Division and the National Guard. Some Sheridans were kept in pre-positioned reserve.

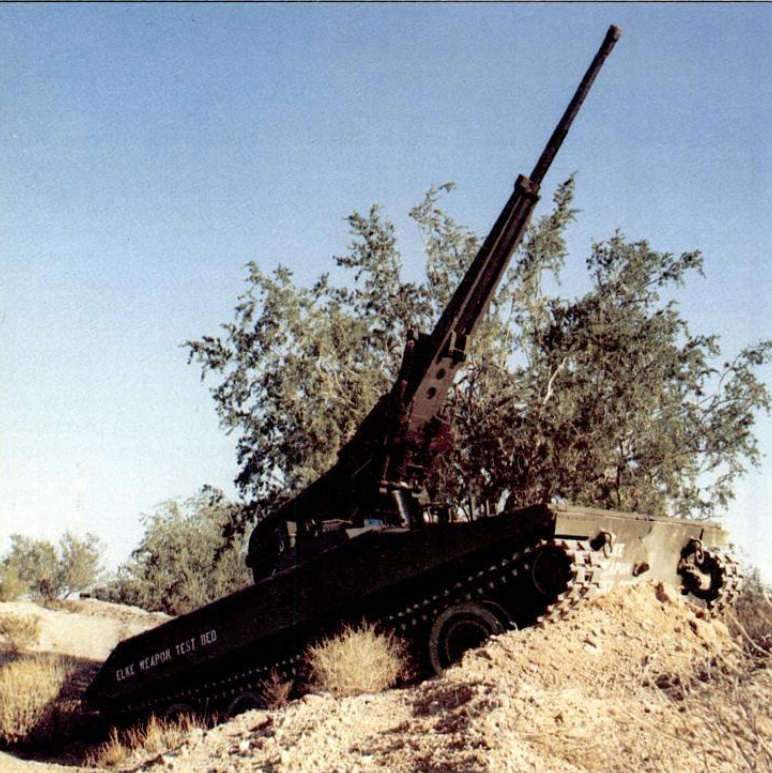
The ELKE test bed on a Sheridan chassis

Several attempts to improve or replace the Sheridan have been made over the years since it was introduced. In 1976, DARPA (followed by TACOM) initiated the High Mobility/Agility (HIMAG) program. Several concepts were pursued, including the High Survivability Test Vehicle (Lightweight) and the Elevated Kinetic Energy (ELKE) gun system. The latter was trialed on a Sheridan hull in 1982. Following the Iran hostage crisis, the Rapid Deployment Force concept was pursued by both the Army and the Marine Corps. The Marine Corps initiated the Mobile Protected Weapon System (MPWS) program. In 1983, the Naval Surface Weapons Research Center Laboratory mounted a 105 mm caliber gun onto a Sheridan chassis. The Army initiated the Mobile Protected Gun program, and announced plans to modify Sheridans with 105 mm or 120 mm caliber guns. Neither program was pursued further; The Army project was canceled in 1985.

From 1978 to 1980, under the joint Army–Marine Corps Advanced Antiarmor Vehicle Evaluation (ARMVAL), TACOM rebuilt 10 Sheridans with the General Motors 8V53T diesel engine and improved suspension. The vehicle's armament and some armor was removed. The uprated engine and improved suspension improved the power-to-weight ratio and cross-country mobility. The Army also evaluated a fully stabilized Staget sighting system.

In 1987, the Army tested a version of the LAV-25, classified as the M1047. The Army determined that these were unsuitable for LAPES, and could not match the firepower of the Sheridan. Congress did not favor the M1047, though a few were deployed with the 3/73rd Armor in the Gulf War. The Marine Corps also developed the LAV-105 to meet its requirements, but later canceled that project as well. In 1992, the Army selected FMC Corporation to produce the Armored Gun System (AGS), later type classified as the M8 Armored Gun System. The AGS was canceled in 1996 by the Pentagon before it could enter production. United Defense proposed the AGS as its mobile gun system variant in the Interim Armored Vehicle program. In 2000, the Army instead selected a variant of the General Dynamics LAV III, later type-classified as the M1128 mobile gun system. The Mobile Gun System's problematic service history led to the vehicle's planned retirement in 2022.

The Army initiated development of a light tank acquisition program called Mobile Protected Firepower, selecting the General Dynamics Land Systems Griffin II in June 2022. The U.S. Army took delivery of the first production vehicle in February 2024, and the vehicle has been type classified as the M10 Booker. In May 2025 the acquisition of the M10 Booker was cancelled.

== Design ==
=== Armament ===
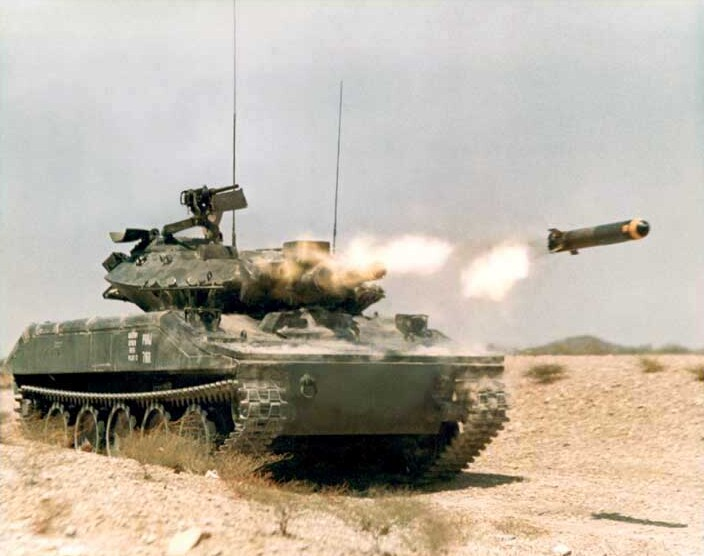
MGM-51 Shillelagh fired from XM551 Sheridan pilot #12 in 1967

Primary armament

The 152 mm M81 gun-launcher that came to be used in the Sheridan was developed by Ford-Aeronutronic under a contract awarded by the Army in 1959. The gun's primary purpose was to fire the Shillelagh missile, but it could also fire more conventional combustible case ammunition. Two factors contributed to the selection of such a large-caliber gun. The Army desired a gun that would be capable of penetrating 150 mm of armor at 60 degrees, more than the 76 mm guns of the M41 or T92 were capable of. Secondly, the Shillelagh missile housed complicated electronics in addition to its warhead. As a consequence of the pairing of a large caliber gun and relatively lightweight vehicle, only low-velocity rounds would be compatible with the gun.

A number of existing vehicles already mounted only ATGMs, or alternately recoilless rifles like the M50 Ontos, but these typically had limited utility in the infantry support role, or in the case of Ontos could not be reloaded from within the vehicle. The XM551 appeared to offer a superior balance between anti-tank and infantry support. The gun was ideal for infantry support. The large, low velocity gun could fire a large high explosive projectile or canister shot. In comparison, high-velocity anti-tank guns over-penetrated soft targets, while smaller caliber weapons could not carry as great a payload.

The Shillelagh missile system experienced problems with its missile guidance system early in its development. Two problems were identified. First, smoke from the rocket motor disrupted the infrared signal, necessary for guidance, between the tank and missile. A similar issue was identified during conditions where the sun was behind the turret. The first issue was resolved by changing the propellant to a composition that produced less smoke. This and other fixes were successful in resolving the problems with the missile guidance. In a year-long test that concluded in 1964, 58 out of 63 launches were successful.

The M81 fired combustible case conventional ammunition in addition to the Shillelagh missile. This solution was chosen rather than a conventional metal case because the Army desired that the Sheridan use the same ammunition as the MBT-70. In theory the combustible nitrocellulose case would be completely consumed during the firing of the ammunition. In practice, as often as 39 percent of the time, the case could absorb moisture from the air and only be partially consumed. This was dangerous to the crew as the smoldering case could prematurely detonate the next loaded round, as happened three times during five months of testing from November 1966 to March 1967. The cases could also break open, or swell so much with moisture that they could not be chambered. The Army started packaging the rounds in Neoprene bags to reduce the impact of moisture on the combustible case rounds. These were removed by the loader before the round was used. The combustible case was made more durable, and less likely to break, in subsequent generations of ammunition. An open-breech scavenging system using compressed air to blow any debris out of the gun was installed to resolve the issue of smoldering debris in the breech. This created problems of its own as the system could blow smoldering debris into the crew compartment. Recognizing the danger, the Army canceled production of this system. A closed breech system that solved the problem was put into production in 1968. Vehicles without this system, the first 700 off the production line were waylayed in storage pending the installation of this system. The gun with this new system installed was called the M81E1. Sheridans with this system installed carried 29 rounds of ammunition instead of 30 due to space constraints.

The second and even third road wheels could clear off the ground when the main gun fired high-explosive anti-tank rounds. The recoil was so violent that components such as the commander's birdcage armor and the searchlight were liable to come off. In the Vietnam War, firing the gun often adversely affected the delicate electronics, which were at the early stages of the transition to solid state devices, so the missile and its guidance system was omitted from vehicles deployed to South Vietnam. The expensive missile was fired in anger only in the Persian Gulf War's Operation Desert Storm, despite a production run of 88,000 units.

Ammunition:

- MGM-51 Shillelagh missile.
- MTM-51 Shillelagh missile training round.
- M409, high-explosive anti-tank multipurpose (HEAT-MP).
- HE-T XM657E2 Shell, high explosive. Never standardized.
- Canister M625, beehive anti-personnel round launching 10,000 13-grain flechettes from the muzzle. Could be used to clear foliage or against personnel.
- XM617, anti-personnel round firing 8,200 fléchettes.
- XM410-WP, white phosphorus smoke round. Never standardized.
- M411A1 Shell (TP-T), training round.

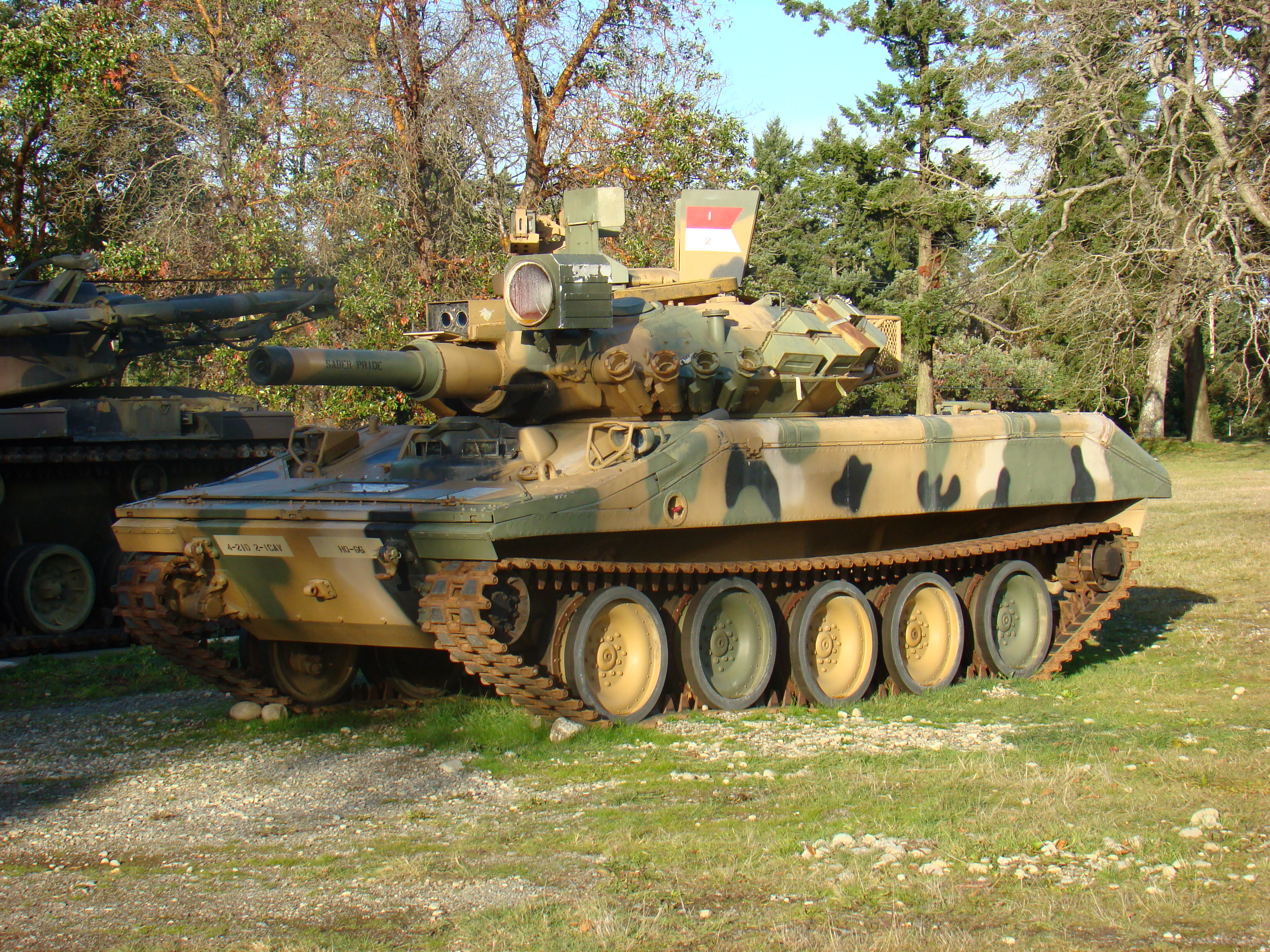
Sheridan with late modifications and ACAV shields

Secondary armament

The commander's cupola was armed with a .50 caliber M2HB in a flexible anti-aircraft mount on the turret. Stowage capacity was for 1000 rounds

Early production Sheridans were armed with the 7.62 mm M73 coaxial machine gun. These were soon replaced with the M73E1 model and then the 7.62 mm M219 variant. The M73 and M219 were problematic designs and were replaced by the 7.62 mm M240 machine gun. Stowage capacity was for 3,000 rounds.

Early XM551 pilots had a .50 caliber spotting rifle, and pilot #7 had a 15mm XM122 spotting rifle. Development of spotting rifles was ended when it was decided to eventually install laser rangefinders on the production vehicle.

=== Armor ===
The vehicle had a steel turret and aluminum hull. Although the hull could deflect heavy machine gun fire of up to 12.7 mm AP, it was easily penetrated by rocket-propelled grenades (RPGs), which could destroy the vehicle if the spalling contacted the caseless main gun rounds. Like the M113 armored personnel carrier, it was vulnerable to mines.

=== Mobility ===
==== Tactical mobility ====
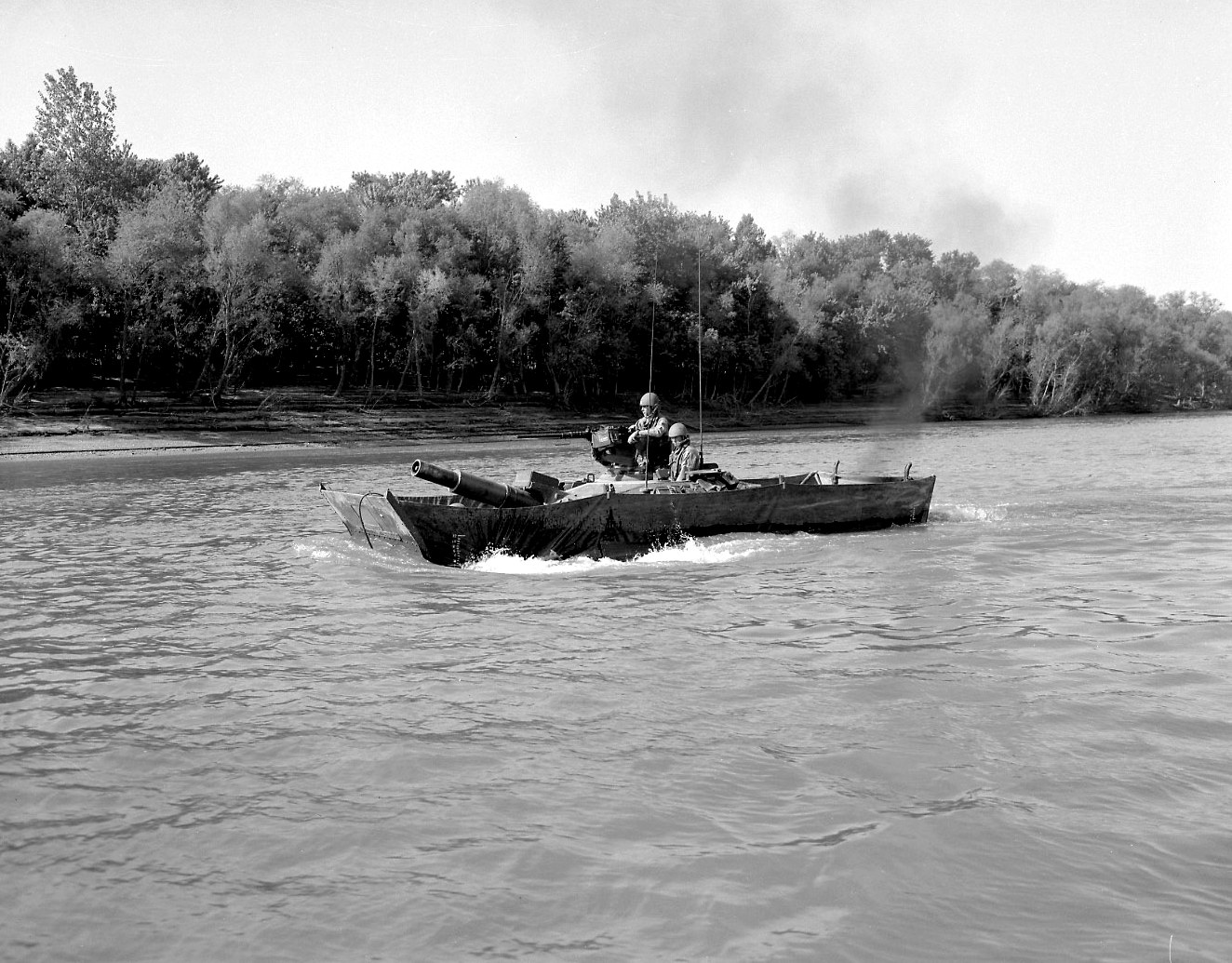
XM-551 Pilot #12 at Fort Knox, Ky mid 60's

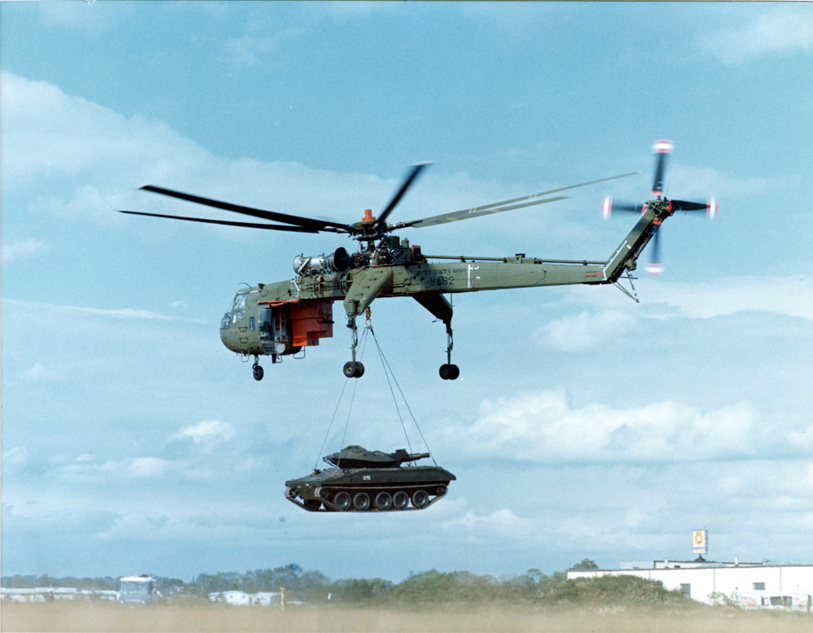
CH-54B carrying an M551 Sheridan, Redstone Arsenal, Alabama

The Sheridan was powered by a large 300-hp (224 kW) Detroit Diesel 6V53T diesel engine, and a flat track (no support rollers). The XM551 thus had an excellent power-to-weight ratio and mobility, able to run at speeds up to 72 km/h (45 mph). However, the vehicle proved to be very noisy and early Sheridans were unreliable under combat conditions.

Swimming capability was provided by a flotation screen. The front armor was overlain by folding "surfboard". This could be opened up into a sloping vertical surface in front of the driver, providing a bow of a boat hull, about level with the top of the turret. Fabric formed the rest of the water barrier, folding up from compartments lining the upper corner where the side met the top of the hull, and held up at the back with poles. The front of the "hull" was provided with a plastic window, but in practice it was found that water splashing onto it made it almost useless, and the driver instead usually had to take steering directions from the vehicle commander. The M2 Bradley adopted a similar solution, but dropped it with upgraded armor. The Sheridan could swim across a river that was about 46 m (50 yards) wide. Tanks in the Patton series (M46, M47, M48), as well as the M60 tank could not perform these operations; they would have to crawl along the river bottoms using snorkels. Not by design, it was found that the swimming hardware acted to reduce the effectiveness of RPG hits. Although it was rarely used in Vietnam, fording was frequently used during Reforger exercises in Europe.

The Sheridan was capable of being lifted by the Sikorsky CH-54 Tarhe heavy-lift helicopter.

==== Strategic mobility ====
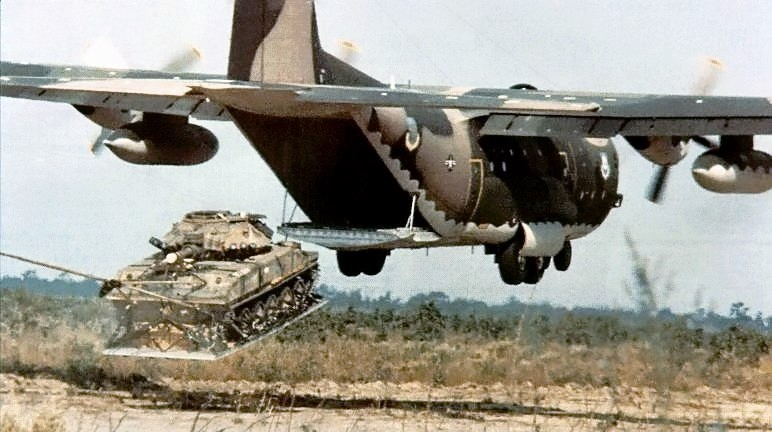
A C-130 delivering an M551 Sheridan using LAPES (Low Altitude Parachute Extraction System).

The Sheridan could be rigged for low-velocity airdrop from C-130 (19,000 kg, 42,000 lb max load), C-141 aircraft (17,460 kg, 38,500 lb max load), and the C-5. Many films exist showing the Sheridan being pulled out of a C-130 Hercules transport by brake chutes and skidding to a stop. The Low Altitude Parachute Extraction System (LAPES) is a somewhat risky maneuver that allowed accurate delivery onto a field when landing is not possible, and the practice was stopped in the late 1990s. The tank was strapped down to a special pallet which absorbed most of the landing impact. The crew did not ride in the tank during extraction, but parachuted from another plane. On landing, they would go to their tank, release the lines, and drive it away.

== Variants ==
- XM551 – Limited run pre-production model produced in 1965.
- M551 − Basic production model, beginning production in 1967.
  - "Two Box" M551 − With the obvious shortcomings of the Shillelagh missile, all but two of the guidance and fire control components of the missile system were removed (the power supply and rate sensor were retained. These were needed for stabilized turret operation.). The resulting additional space was filled with two separate boxes, one for 7.62×51mm NATO ammunition (coaxial machine gun), and one for 12.7×99mm NATO (.50 BMG) ammunition, and the missile stowage was redesigned to accept conventional rounds.
- M551A1 − Upgraded M551 with AN/VVG-1 laser rangefinder in 1972.
  - M551A1 TTS − Tank Thermal Sight, fitted with the AN/VSG-2B thermal sight unit, similar to the unit used on the M60A3 MBT. This later became standard to all M551A1s in 80s.
- M551A2 (OPFOR VISMOD) − Opposing Force Vehicle, visually modified vehicle to simulate Soviet armoured fighting vehicles and armed with laser simulators and blank firing devices for OPFOR exercises. 330 were converted in total
- Armored Tracked Recovery Vehicle (ATRV) − Prototype.

=== Table of variants ===
	XM551 pilots 1–3	M551	M551A1 Sheridan (TTS)
Hull Length	258 in (6.6 m)	248 in (6.3 m)	
Width	110 in (2.8 m)		
Height	108 in (2.7 m)	116 in (2.9 m)	
Ground Clearance	19 in (48.3 cm)		
Top speed	35 mph (56 km/h)	43 mph (69 km/h)	
Fording	Floats		
Max Grade	60 percent		
Max Trench	5 ft (1.5 m)	8 ft (2.4 m)	
Max Wall	18 in (0.5 m)	33 in (0.8 m)	
Range	300 mi (480 km)	350 mi (560 km)	
Power	285 hp (213 kW) at 2800 rpm	300 hp (220 kW) at 2800 rpm	
Power-to-Weight Ratio	17.1 hp/ST (14.1 kW/t)	17.9 hp/ST (14.7 kW/t)	
Torque	435 lb⋅ft (590 N⋅m) at 1900 rpm	615 lb⋅ft (830 N⋅m) at 2100 rpm	
Weight, Combat Loaded	33,247 lb (15,080 kg)	33,460 lb (15,180 kg)	33,600 lb (15,240 kg)
Ground Pressure	6.7 psi (46 kPa)	6.8 psi (47 kPa)	6.9 psi (48 kPa)
Main Armament	M81E3 152 mm gun/launcher	M81E12 152 mm gun/launcher	M81E1 152 mm gun/launcher
Coaxial weapon	XM121 .50 caliber (12.7 mm) spotting rifle, M73 7.62 mm machine gun	M73 or M219 7.62 mm machine gun	M240 7.62 mm machine gun
Elevation	+20° / -10°	+19.5° / -8°	
Traverse Rate	15 seconds/360°	10 seconds/360°	
Elevation Rate	4°/second		
Main Gun Ammo	20 rounds	30 (including 10 missiles)	29 (including 9 missiles)
Firing rate	4 rounds per minute		
Protection	7039 aluminium alloy hull, Rolled homogeneous steel turret		

== Users ==
=== Former users ===
- Australia: A Sheridan was evaluated from 1967 to 1968, but was rejected due to belief that it would fare poorly in "Vietnam-type" conflicts.
- United States: U.S. Army

=== Prospective users ===
- U.S. Marine Corps: Considered but rejected to replace the M50 Ontos under the Light Armored Combat Vehicleprogram.

== Display vehicles ==
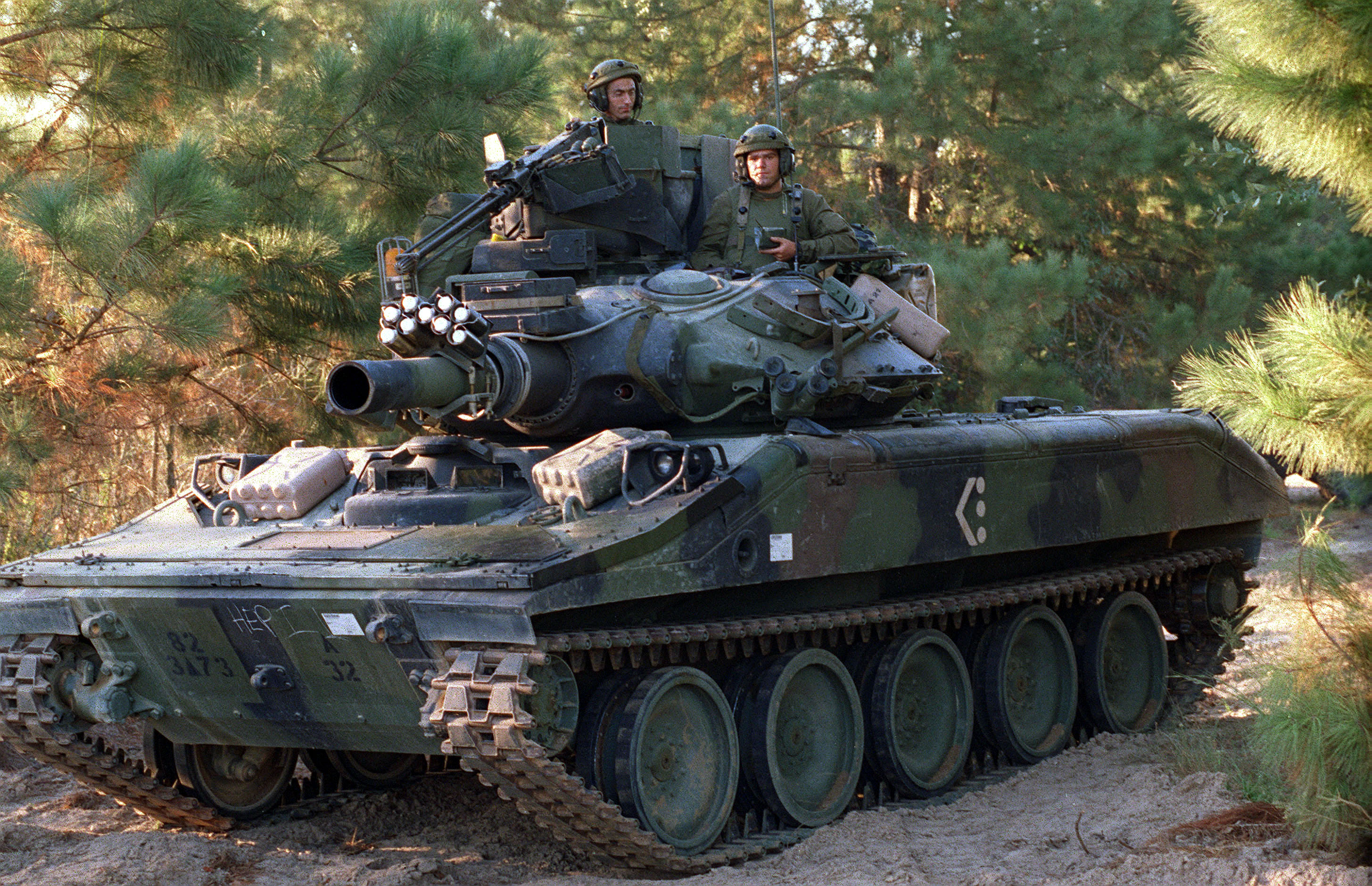
An armored crew from the 82nd Airborne Division, driving an M551A1 Sheridan light tank performing the opposing force role, takes time out at a nearby trail during their rotation at the Joint Readiness Training Center

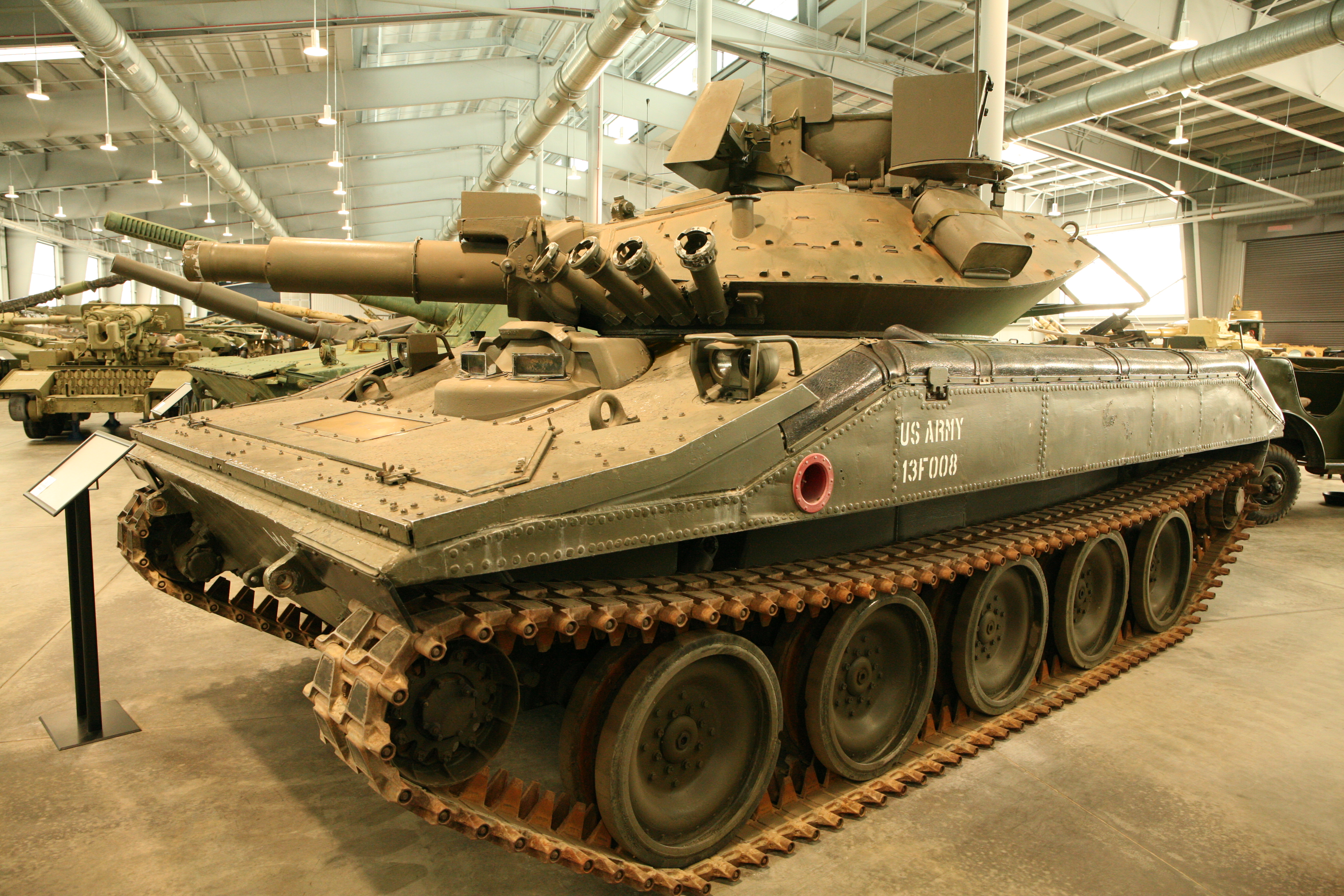
M551 Sheridan at the U.S. Army Armor & Cavalry Collection at Fort Benning, in 2023

- Airborne & Special Operations Museum, Fayetteville, NC
- American Armoured Foundation's Tank and Ordnance War Memorial Museum, Danville, VA. M551A1 deployed in Desert Shield/Storm. Markings: 3rd Battalion 73 Regiment, Co. B, 2nd platoon, attached to the 82nd Airborne Division.
- American Heritage Museum, Stow, Massachusetts has an M551 that is in operating condition.
- American Society of Military History and Museums, South El Monte, Ca. 2 non running exhibits and a running, ex-vismod unit.
- Antioch, Illinois has a veterans monument displaying a M551A1 across the street from the police station.
- Camp Joseph T. Robinson, Arkansas National Guard Museum
- Camp Perry, near Port Clinton, Ohio, has an M551 on display as part of a static display.
- Columbia, MO Outdoor display at American Legion Park, off East Broadway, 602 Legion Ln, Columbia, MO 65201, United States.
- First Division Museum at Cantigny, an example of the M551A1 is on display in the tank park outside the museum in Wheaton, Illinois.
- Fort Bliss, static display at Sheridan Gate entrance.
- Fort Hunter Liggett on static display at the entrance.
- Fort Irwin/NTC, has one vehicle on display at the 11th Cavalry Regiment museum.
- Fort Johnson, a "T-72" VISMOD is on display on Mississippi Avenue near the headquarters of 1st Battalion, 509th Parachute Infantry Regiment.
- Fort Knox, Kentucky. Static display at Wilson Road entrance.
- Fort Bragg, NC Outdoor exhibit at the 82d Airborne Division War Memorial Museum.
- Fort Benning, static display on Tower Branch of U.S. Army Airborne School across from Maneuver Center of Excellence.
- Fort Richardson, Camp Denali on static display.
- Gowen Field, Idaho Army National Guard
- Hardwood Range, an example is on static display at the visitor center at Hardwood Air-to-Ground Weapons Range in Finley, Wisconsin.
- Ike Skelton Missouri National Guard Training Facility, Jefferson City Missouri. Ike Skelton Training Facility has a M551 in their outside museum.
- Louisiana National Guard Training Center Pineville in Pineville, LA static display outside of the post museum.
- Leon Davenport Building in Blairsville, GA has an M551 on display outside.
- Mott's Military Museum in Groveport, Ohio has an M551 on display outside with other various vehicles.
- The Museum of American Armor, Old Bethpage, NY on static display.
- Museum of Missouri Military History, on static display outside the museum.
- The Ontario Regiment Museum, in Oshawa, has two Sheridan tanks on display. One is in not operating condition and the other has been restored with its original 11th Cavalry markings.
- Sullenberger Aviation Museum
- Vhas an M551A1 on display outside of the building at 6401 Beckley St.
- Watervliet Arsenal
- Yad La-Shiryon Israel
- Yuma Proving Ground in Yuma, AZ. On static display outside range control.

On static display at the Chaumont American legion post #243 in South Plainfield NJ.

- The Sheridan M551 was relocated from the front of the VVA location at 6401 Beckley Street, Baltimore, MD 21224 to the VFW location at 437 East 3rd Street, Emporium, PA 15834.

== See also ==
- List of "M" series military vehicles
- List of vehicles of the U.S. Armed Forces
- M60A2, which used a similar 152 mm gun-launcher
- M3 Bradley, a modern AFV that sometimes covers the same roles
