= Low-altitude parachute-extraction system =

Tactical military airlift delivery method

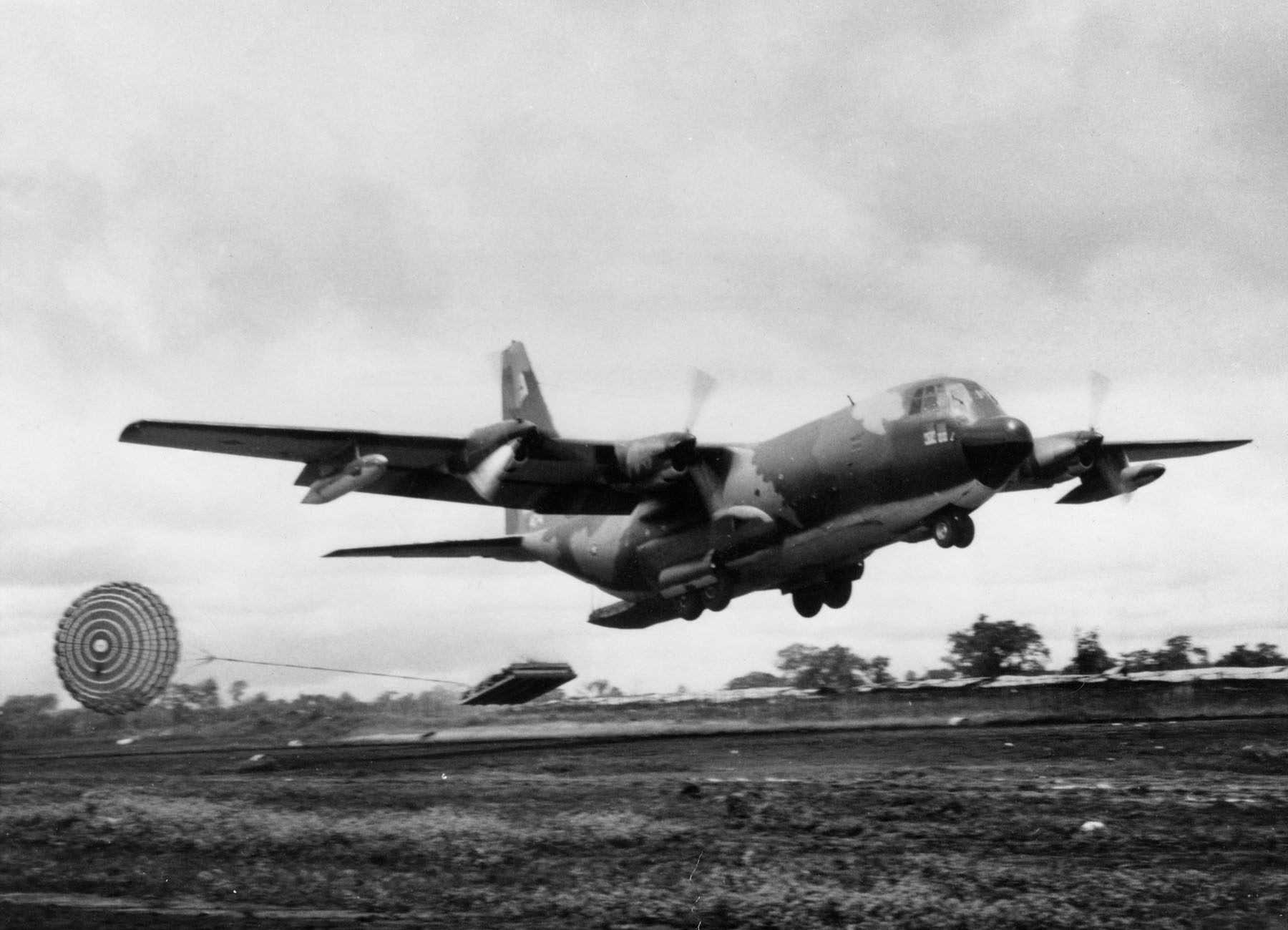
C-130 Hercules dropping pallet with low-altitude parachute-extraction system on Khe Sanh runway

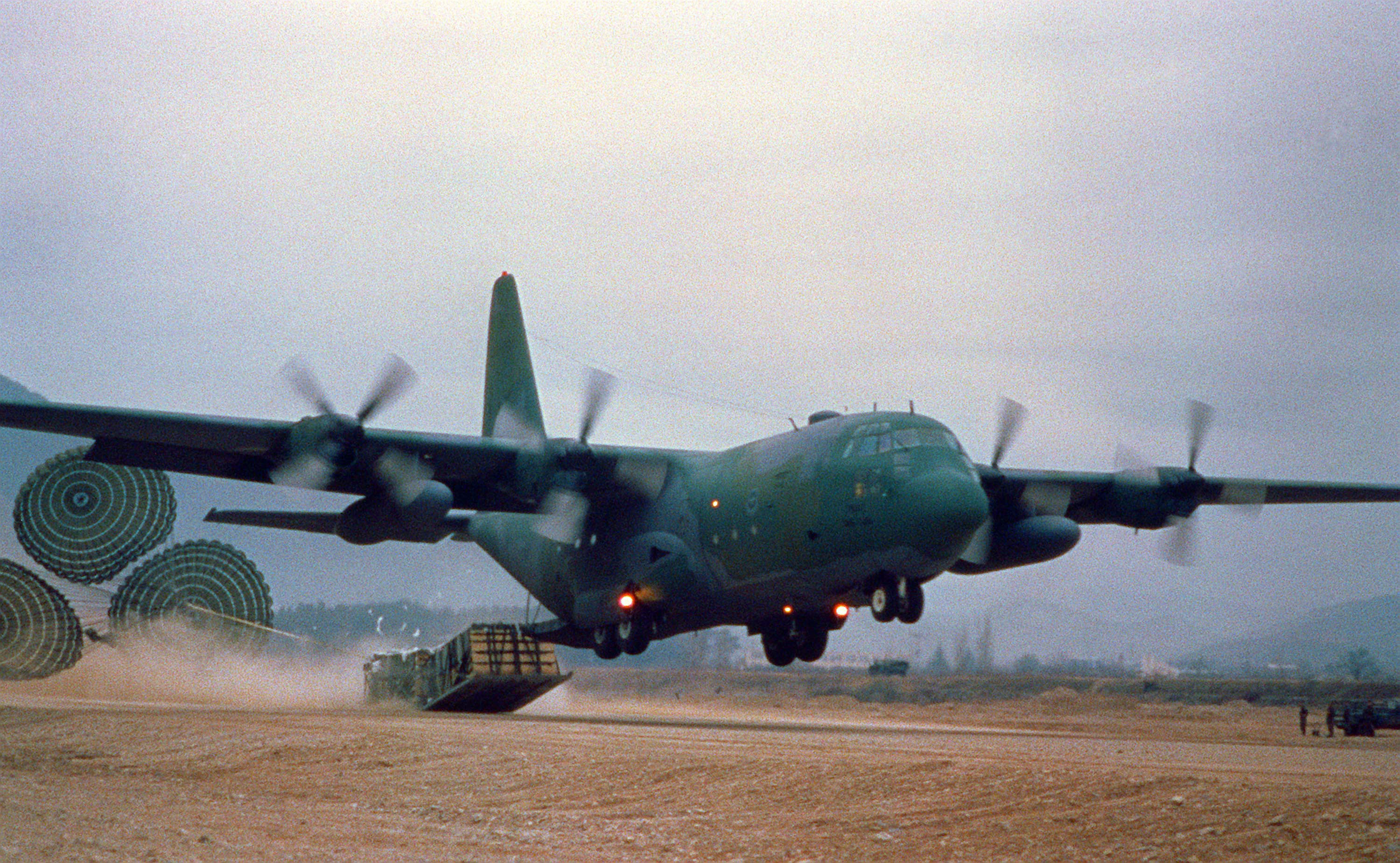
A C-130 performing a low-altitude parachute extraction.

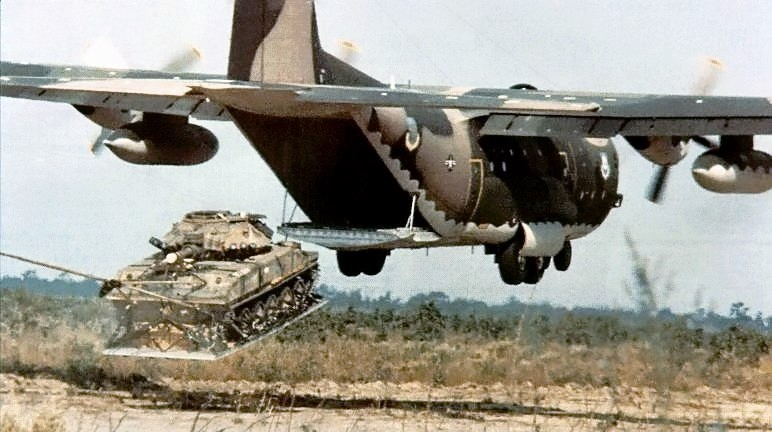
An M551 Sheridan being dropped from a C-130 Hercules

The low-altitude parachute-extraction system (LAPES) / Low-level parachute extraction resupply system (LOLEX) is a tactical military airlift delivery method where a fixed-wing cargo aircraft can deposit supplies in situations in which landing is not an option or in an area that is too small to accurately parachute supplies from a high altitude. This practice is no longer used in the USAF.

== Development ==
This method was developed by the US Military with the assistance of the 109th Quartermaster Company (Air Drop) in 1964. In May 1965, a detachment of the 109th was formed as the 383rd Quartermaster (Aerial Supply) Detachment and sent to Vietnam. In 1966 the 109th was sent to Vietnam and took operational control of the 383rd. Both units provided air drop and LAPES support during the Battle of Khe Sanh in the Vietnam War. LAPES was used to provide a method of supplying heavy loads into Khe Sanh which could not effectively be supplied by air drop. This practice was perfected at Mactan Air Base in Cebu, Philippines.

== Operation ==
Preparation for a LAPES delivery includes loading cargo on a pallet rigged with two types of parachutes (chutes). The drogue chute is used to pull a cluster of larger extraction chutes out. The deployed extraction chutes will then pull the load out of the plane. Floor locks hold the pallet in place until extraction time.

The LAPES delivery procedure begins by slowing to approach speed, lowering the ramp, and opening the cargo door. To preclude damage to the aircraft from an inadvertent contact with the ground, the landing gear is lowered. The aircraft approaches the extraction zone in a manner similar to landing. On command of the pilot, the drogue chute is released and allowed to trail behind the aircraft on a tether. As the pilot flares and achieves a wheel height of 1-2 meters above ground, the drogue chute is allowed to pull the extraction chutes out into the airstream. The force of these chutes overcomes the floor locks, pulling the pallet across the ramp, out of the aircraft, and onto the extraction zone. The pilot adjusts the flight controls to remain level during the extreme change in the aircraft center of gravity caused by the pallet movement. While the pallet slides to a stop using the extraction chutes as a brake, the pilot climbs away from the extraction zone and raises the landing gear. On climb out, the rear cargo door is closed and the ramp is raised, completing the sequence.

LAPES enables planes to quickly deploy large cargo in a timely fashion instead of having to land and take off, which exposes the plane to enemy fire. The technique also allows delivery of loads that are too heavy for a direct parachute descent (high altitude drop). However, the drop sequence's low altitude allows for no margin of pilot error and the risk of plane crash is heightened.

== Crashes ==
- On November 16, 1982, C-130H 130329 of the Canadian Forces crashed during a LAPES operation at Namao when the load failed to clear the aircraft, causing it to crash. All seven of the crew were killed on impact as the C-130 struck the ground.

- On July 1, 1987, during a capabilities exercise (CAPEX), a USAF C-130E (68-10945 c/n 4325) crashed while performing a LAPES demo at the Sicily Drop Zone, on Fort Bragg. The pilot of the C-130 had performed a LAPES drop with the same extreme rate of descent two days earlier during a practice run. The crash killed three on board and one soldier on the ground, and injured two crew.
