= CAPEX (cooperative) =

Kerala organization promoting cashew industry

- Kerala State Cashew Workers Apex Industrial Co-operative Society
- Formation: 1984
- Founder: Government of Kerala
- Purpose: Promotion of cashew industry and employment generation
- Headquarters: Kollam, Kerala, India
- Region served: Kerala
- Employees: 6000 (1996–1997)
- Website: cashewcapex.com

CAPEX, also known as the Kerala State Cashew Workers Apex Industrial Co-operative Society, is an organization managed by the government of Kerala to promote the cashew industry and especially the export market for cashews.

== History ==
The organization was founded in 1984. The headquarters of CAPEX is situated at Kollam.

== Organization ==
Part of the organization's mission is to provide the maximum number of workdays to cashew workers as a government employment assistance program.

In 1996–1997 the organization managed ten factories and employed 6000 staff.
