= Capabilities exercise =

A capabilities exercise (CAPEX) is a form of military or emergency response exercise. Examples include capabilities exercises conducted for the low-altitude parachute-extraction system, the VMA-542 fixed wing attack squadron, or to demonstrate a capability such as deployment of emergency response assets, and so on.
