= EBRC Jaguar =

French armoured reconnaissance vehicle

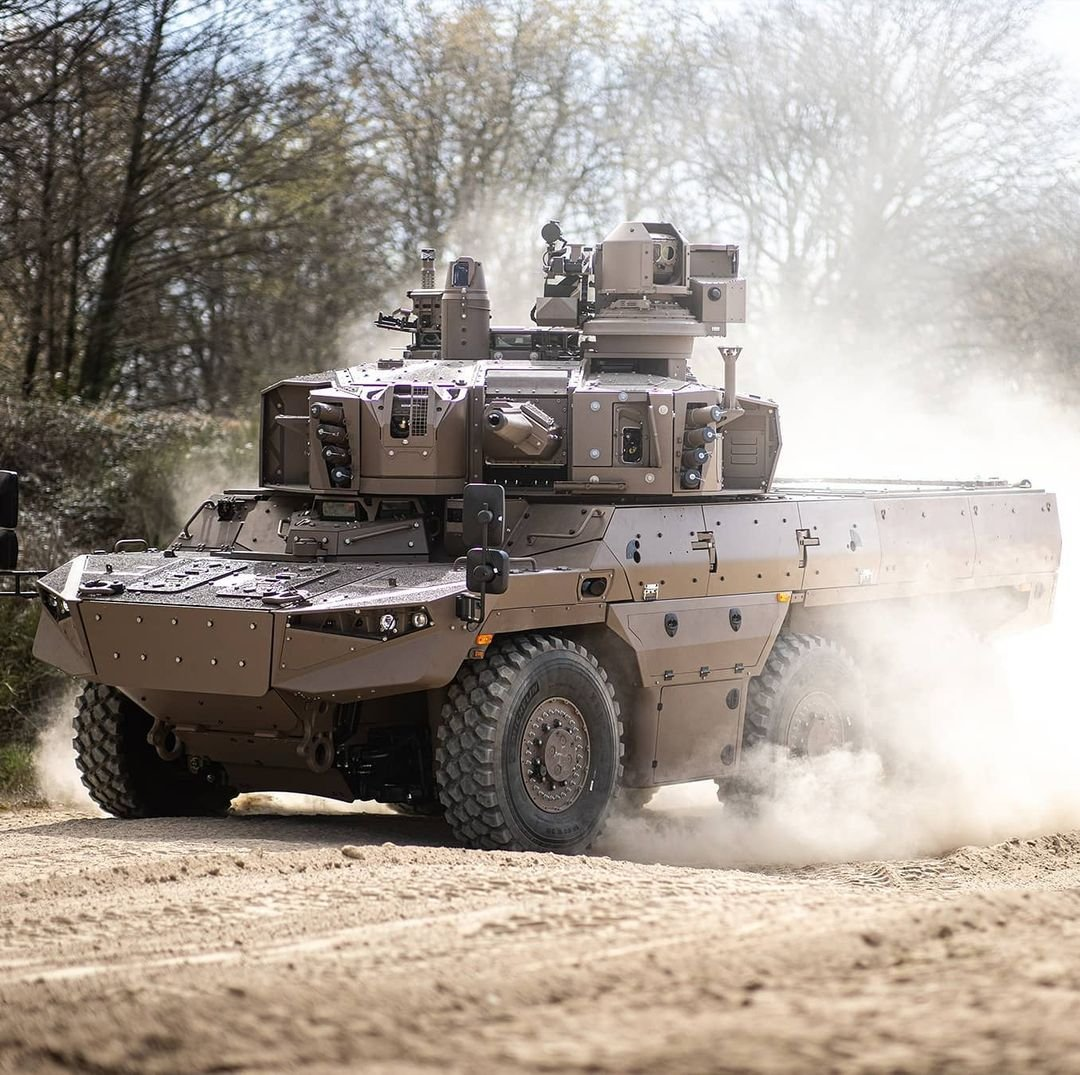
- EBRC Jaguar of the French Army
- Type: Armoured fighting vehicle Armoured reconnaissance vehicle
- Place of origin: France

Service history
- In service: 2022–present
- Used by: France; Belgium

Production history
- Designer: KNDS France; Arquus; Thales
- Designed: 2009–2021
- Manufacturer: KNDS France; Arquus; Thales
- Unit cost: €6 million (FY2019)
- Produced: 2020–present
- No. built: 60 units as of 31 December 2023

Specifications
- Mass: 25 tonnes
- Length: 7.1 m (23 ft 4 in) (chassis); 7.8 m (25 ft 7 in) (including the 40 mm autocannon)
- Width: 2.99 m (9 ft 10 in)
- Height: 2.8 m (9 ft 2 in)
- Crew: 3 (driver + gunner + commander)
- Armour: STANAG 4569 Level 4 (standard); Additional modular armour kits (optional)
- Main armament: 40 mm Cased Telescoped Armament System; 4 Akeron MP missiles
- Secondary armament: T3 Hornet S RCWS with a 7.62 mm machine gun; GALIX self-protection system with 14 80 mm smoke grenades
- Engine: Militarized Volvo D11 6-cylinder in-line turbodiesel engine 500 hp (370 kW)
- Transmission: ZF seven-speed automatic gearbox
- Suspension: Six-wheel drive
- Operational range: 800 km (500 mi)
- Maximum speed: 90 km/h (56 mph)

The Engin Blindé de Reconnaissance et de Combat Jaguar (English: Armoured Reconnaissance and Combat Vehicle Jaguar) or EBRC Jaguar is a six-wheel armoured fighting vehicle developed and manufactured by KNDS France, Arquus and Thales. It is intended to succeed three reconnaissance and/or fire support vehicles in French service—the AMX-10 RC, ERC 90 Sagaie and VAB HOT—and entered service in 2022 after twelve years of development.

The Jaguar is a component of the French SCORPION programme. It is designed for armoured reconnaissance as well as for combat in complex environments such as urban and mountainous areas. 238 units are expected to be delivered to the French Army by 2030 and all 300 vehicles planned by 2035. They will equip seven of its armoured cavalry regiments.

== Background ==
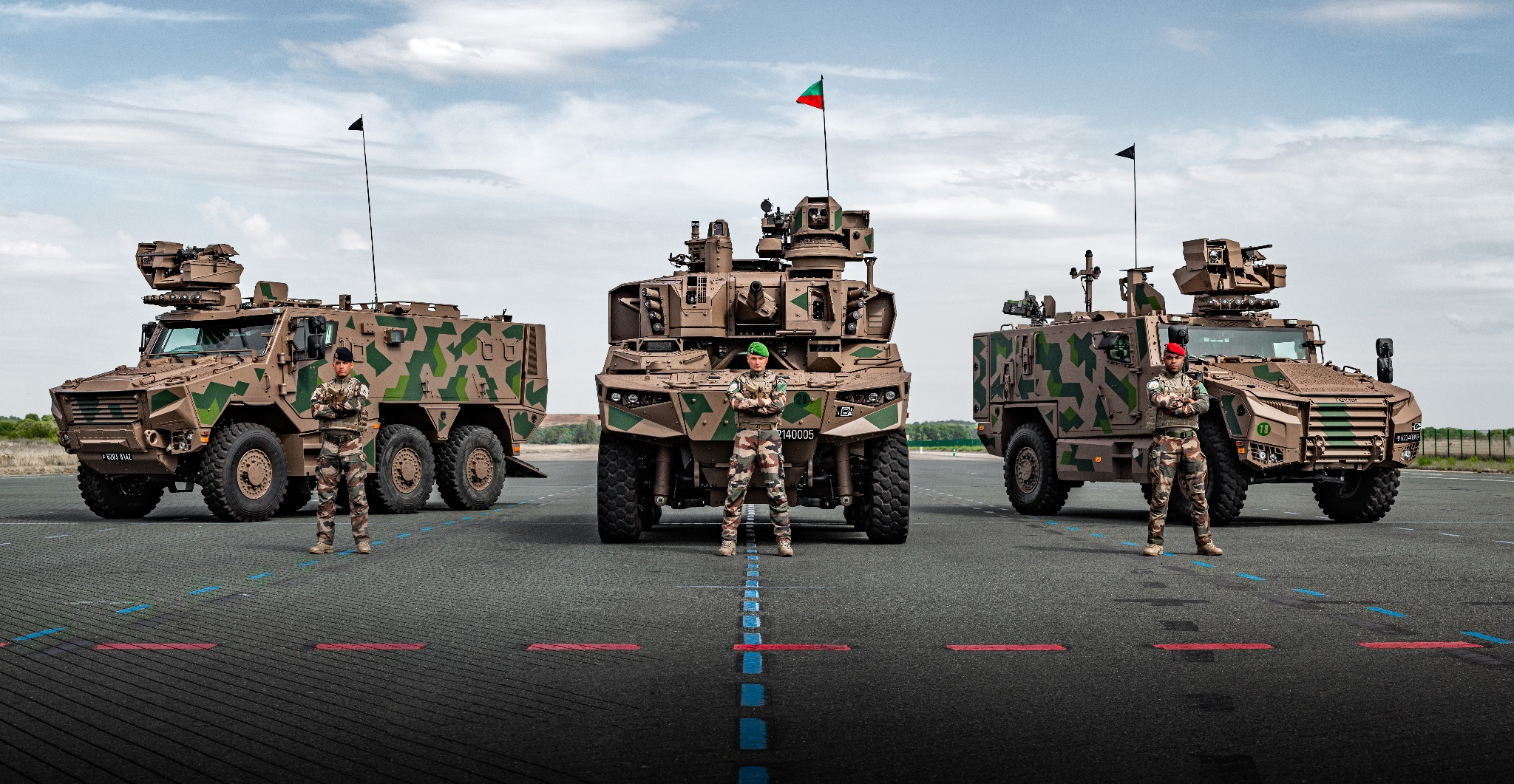
The new SCORPION vehicles ahead of the 2023 Bastille Day Parade: the VBMR Griffon (left), the EBRC Jaguar (centre) and the VBMR-L Serval (right)

In 2009, the French army expressed an operational requirement for a future medium cavalry vehicle. This led to the Engin blindé de reconnaissance et de combat (EBRC) program, launched to address four key issues: operational mobility, flexibility of use, protection and aggression. Twenty or so upstream and technical-operational studies on sub-assemblies carried out by the DGA will then make it possible to establish "possible architectures". These very different architectures are the result of choices such as "wheeled or tracked armor", "6×6 or 8×8", "manned or remotely-operated turret" or "armor in one piece or with additional kits"; all this, while maintaining coherence with the other pillars of SCORPION, the programme to renew the army's medium-range armoured capabilities.

Dialogue between the Direction Générale de l'Armement (DGA), the army and the manufacturers, a consortium formed by Nexter, Arquus and Thales, narrowed the choice to four architectures, then two, before arriving at the reference architecture: a 6×6 vehicle with a manned turret combining a main weapon system with a missile and a remotely-operated turret. The Jaguar was born, an ambitious solution which, with a few exceptions, was not based on any existing components.

The development and purchase of this new generation of armoured fighting vehicles, part of a programme styled SCORPION (Synergie du COntact Renforcée par la Polyvalence et l'InfovalorisatiON; English: Contact Synergy Reinforced by Versatility and Infotainment), was announced in December 2014. It was entrusted by the French Ministry of Defense to a . The long-awaited first stage of the programme was launched in October 2014. This first stage, for a total cost of nearly €5.1 billion (FY2017), includes the replacement of the AMX-10 RC, ERC-90 Sagaie and VAB HOT by the EBRC Jaguar, the replacement of the VAB by the VBMR Griffon, the modernization of the Leclerc tank as well as the development of a unified combat information network to ensure the coherence of systems in service.

Under this initial €5 billion investment plan up to 2025, 110 armoured reconnaissance and combat vehicles (EBRC) and 780 multi-role armoured vehicles (VBMR) were to be acquired. The content of the following stages of the programme was to be consolidated at a later date to achieve the target set by the 2014-2019 Military Programming Law (LPM) and updated by the Defence Council's amendments in April 2016: 1,722 heavy VBMR Griffon, 522 lightweight VBMR (which was to become the VBMR-L Serval), 248 EBRC Jaguar and 200 renovated Leclerc XLR.

In the 2019-2025 LPM adopted in July 2018, the SCORPION programme's targets were revised upwards, with the planned acquisition of 1,872 VBMR Griffon, 978 VMBR-L Serval, 300 EBRC Jaguar, as well as the upgrade of 200 Leclerc tanks and 18 DCL armoured recovery vehicles to the XLR standard, all to be delivered by 2030. The total cost of the programme was estimated at €11 billion, including €2 billion earmarked for the 300 Jaguar. Two orders for 20 and 42 vehicles were signed in April 2017 and September 2020. Deliveries of the first units were somewhat delayed; the Jaguar being an "extremely complex technological object" was, in particular, highlighted among the reasons by Colonel Damien Sandeau, a SCORPION programme officer at the French Army General Staff.

Of the first 20 vehicles received by the DGA in December 2021, 18 were delivered to the 1st African Chasseur Regiment (1er RCA) at Canjuers, in charge of training all the regiments to be equipped with the vehicle. This first batch is to be joined by 18 additional vehicles in 2022, enabling the formation of the crews of the army's seven light cavalry regiments to begin. The 1st Foreign Cavalry Regiment (1er REC) will be the first to be equipped with the Jaguar in May 2022, then the Régiment d'Infanterie Chars de Marine (RCIM) in early 2023, followed in no specific order by the 1st Spahi Regiment, 4th Chasseur Regiment (4e RCh), 3rd Hussar Regiment (3e RH), 1st Marine Infantry Regiment (1er RIMa) and 1st Parachute Hussar Regiment (1er RHP).

In October 2018, the Belgian government formalized the plan to purchase 60 EBRC Jaguar and 382 VBMR Griffon for €1.5 billion. The vehicles will replace the Belgian Army's Piranha IIIC armoured personnel carriers and Dingo 2 infantry mobility vehicles. The deal includes spare parts and secure communications equipment. Deliveries are scheduled to start in 2025.

== Design ==
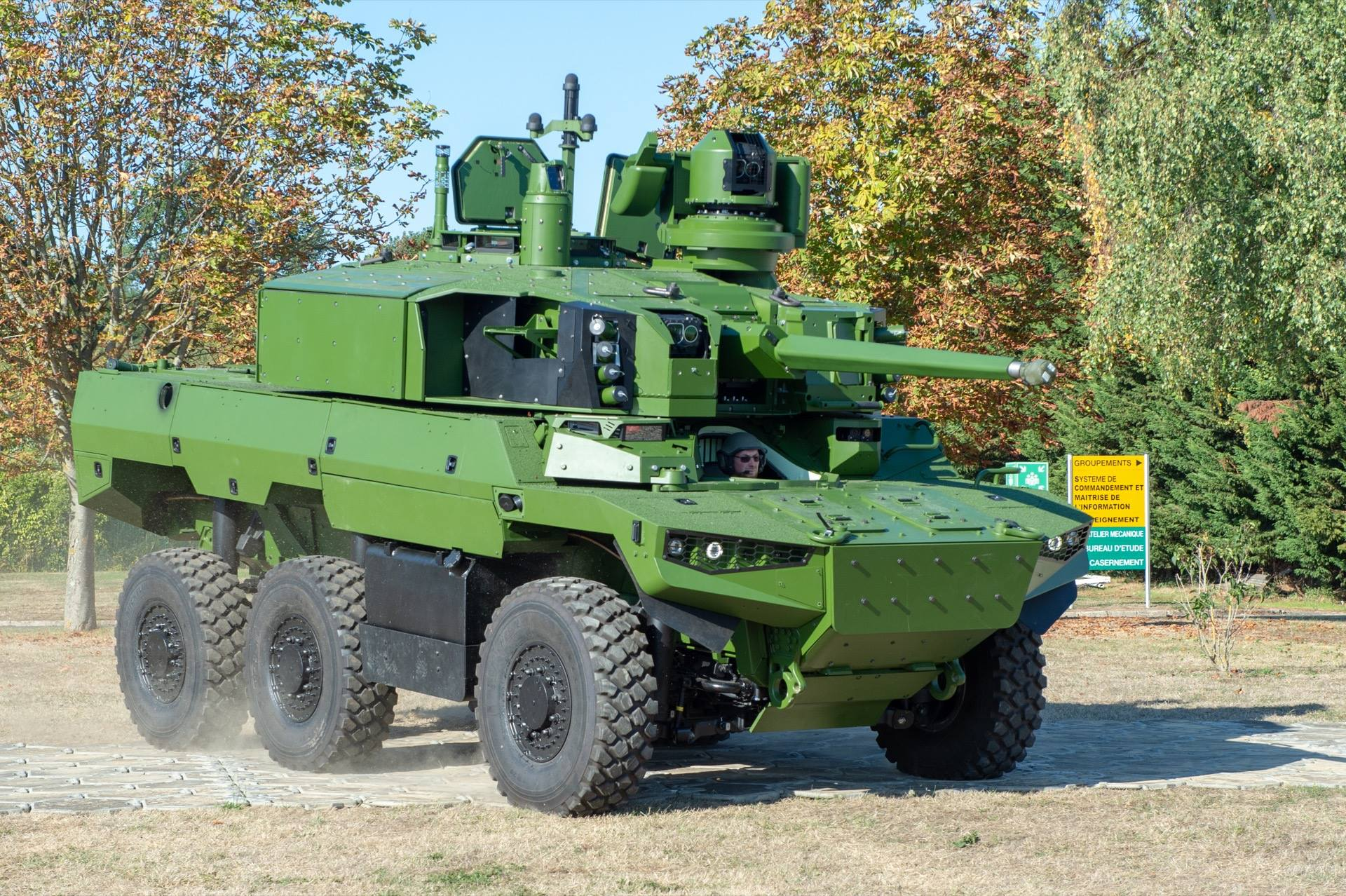
A prototype of the EBRC Jaguar, 2018

When the first stage of the programme was launched in 2014, the aim was to achieve an acquisition cost of €3 million per EBRC and €1 million per VBMR. This was expected to be achieved in part through the large quantities of SCORPION vehicles to be acquired, enabling economies of scale. The consortium opted for the VBMR Griffon to share 70% of its components with the Jaguar to save on development, production and maintenance costs as well as to facilitate logistics. This is reflected by the rather cheap average unit cost of the Griffon and thereby the Serval, for vehicles with their capabilities. Constituents shared include, for example, the suspension, supplied by Strasbourg-based company Quiri, the Elips intercom system by Argenteuil-based Elno, the PILAR V acoustic gunfire detection and localization system by Lyon-based Metravib Defence, as well as the vetronics. Featuring a wide range of state-of-the-art technologies, the Jaguar ultimately ended up costing twice as much as expected with an estimated unit cost of €6 million (FY2019).

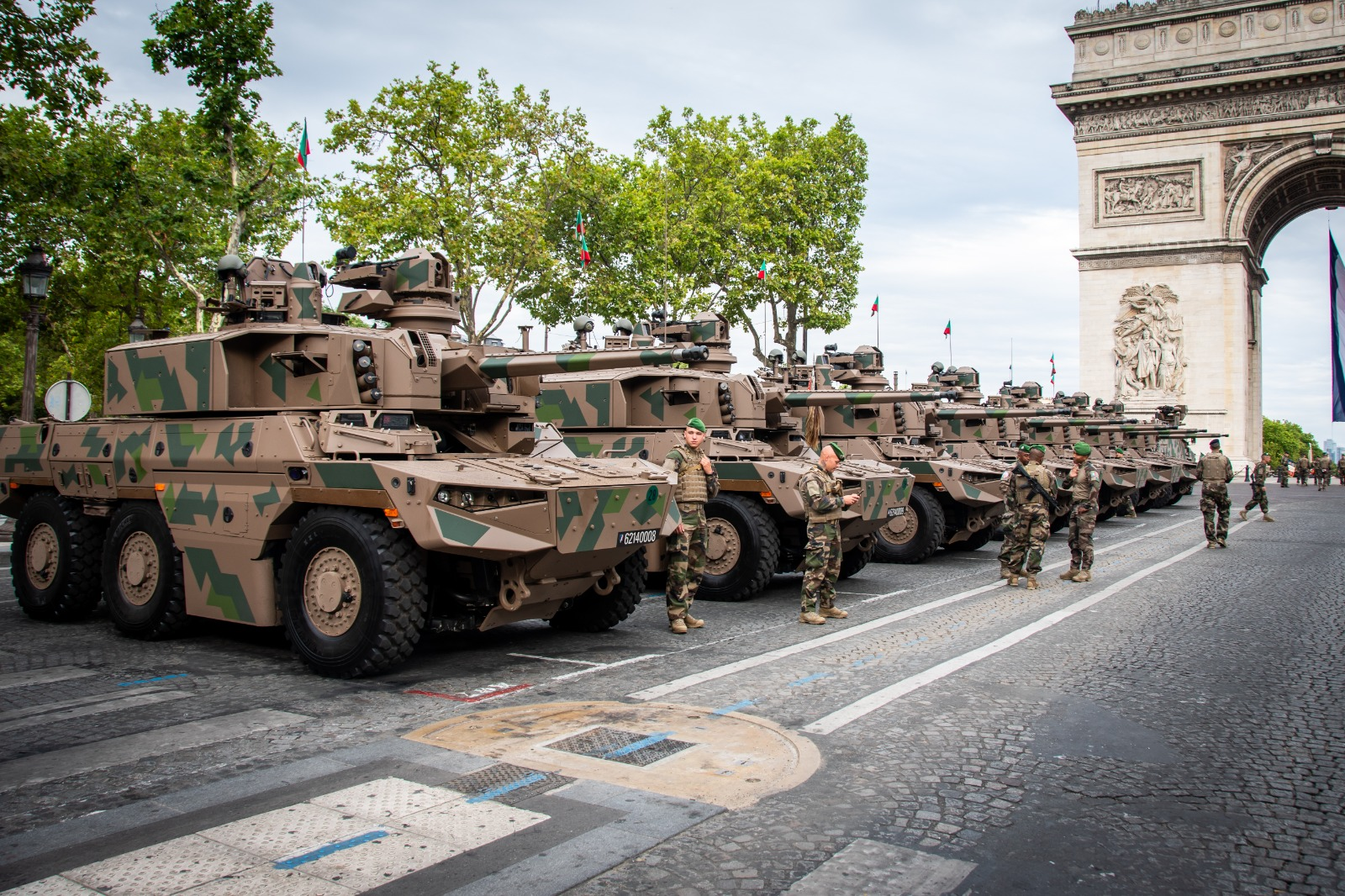
An EBRC Jaguar of the French Army, 1st Foreign Cavalry Regiment, 2023 Bastille Day Parade

As an armoured reconnaissance vehicle, the Jaguar's main mission is to get as close as possible to the enemy to gather intelligence without being detected. This requires it to be mobile, discreet, agile, well-protected, well-armed and able to see far, day and night. The vehicle has the architecture of a tank, with a driver at the front, turret in the middle, rear-wheel drive, except that it is wheeled, instead of tracked. Whether in powertrain, sensors, vetronics or firepower, the Jaguar is claimed to condense the latest technological advances. It has been described as being equivalent to going "from 2G to 5G" for the French cavalry crewman.

The first differentiating evolution is mobility. The vehicle has a higher power-to-weight ratio and greater maneuverability than previous generations. Featuring a seven-speed automatic gearbox, independent running gears, rear steering and six-wheel drive, the Jaguar can reach a maximum speed of 90 km/h on roads and tracks, 70 km/h off-road, as well as up to 15 km/h, forwards or backwards, on very steep slopes. Its 500-liter fuel tank has a range of up to 800 km. Equipped with a variable ground clearance, as well as a tire pressure variation system and a run-flat device, it benefits from great crossing capacity on all types of terrain, whether road, rock or mud. The vehicle is surprisingly quiet, despite being equipped with a militarized variant of the Volvo D11 500 hp six-cylinder in-line turbodiesel engine. The engine is housed in a soundproof compartment and is able to run on different types of fuel, facilitating replenishment wherever in the world French forces would be deployed.

To approach the "prey" discreetly, manufacturers have worked on the vehicle's signature, and its adjustable suspension allows the pilot to shelter behind a trench, lowering it to let only the surveillance systems protrude, or raising it to engage the enemy. The body height can be adjusted by means of a hydraulic system to four positions: "park", for loading onto wagons or long-term parking, then "road", "intermediate" and "off-road". In off-road, the maximum elevation of 47 cm allows river fording of 1.2 m and overcoming obstacles 50 cm high. The Jaguar weighs 22 tonnes unladen and 25 tonnes while combat ready. The specifications regarding strategic mobility stipulated that the vehicle must be air-transportable by A400M. The French army has retained a 300 kg weight reserve, which is essential for future upgrades.

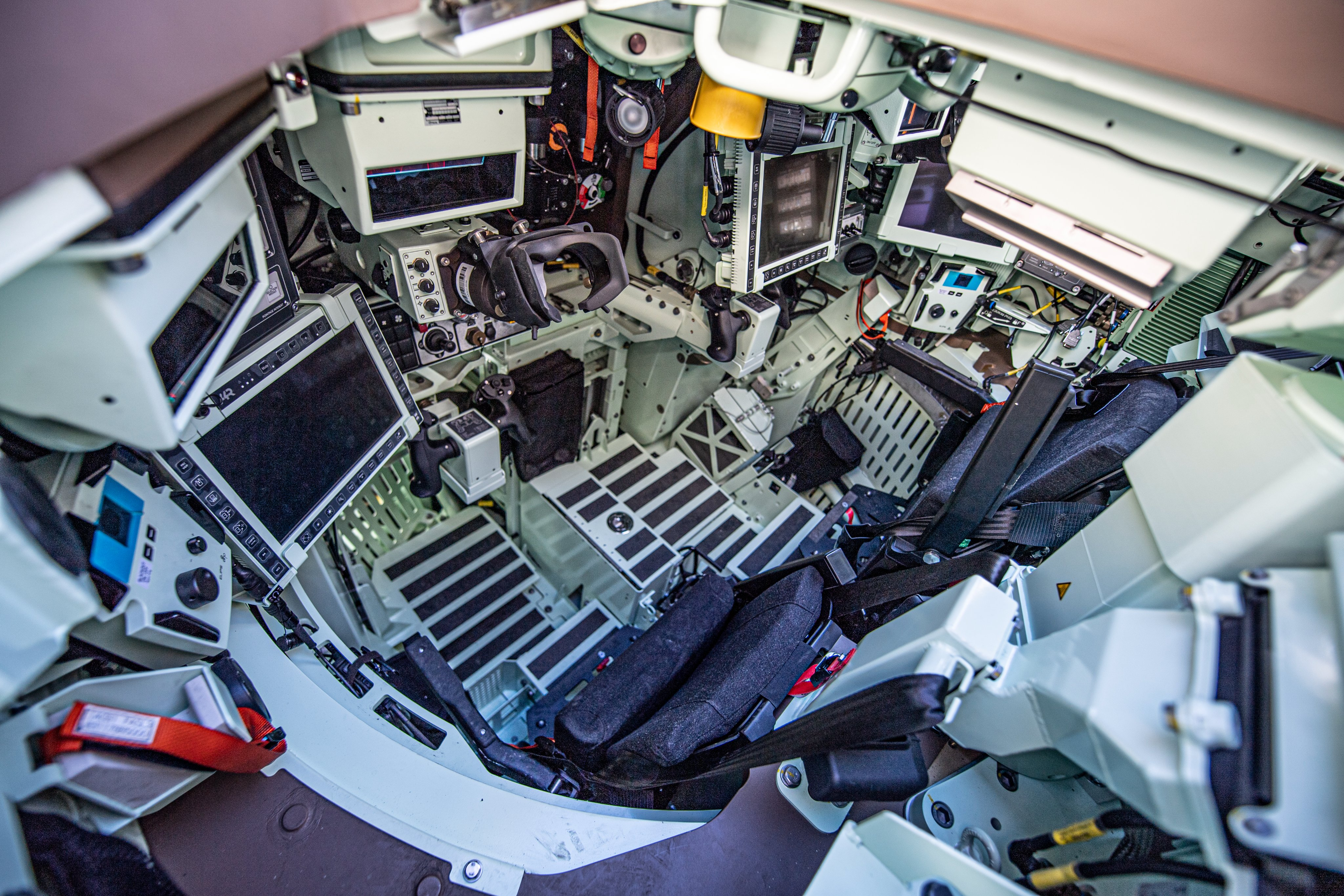
Stations of the gunner (left) and commander (right) inside an EBRC Jaguar

The Jaguar is designed to offer STANAG 4569 Level 4 armour protection as standard, capable of withstanding 14.5 mm armour-piercing ammunition, 155 mm artillery shell splinters, IEDs and mine blasts. In addition to the thickness of the armour, the underbody architecture has been designed around hard points that "reflect" the blast effect outwards. Better protected than its predecessors, the Jaguar will be able to stay in the combat zone longer and not necessarily try to avoid it. Armour protection levels can be raised beyond STANAG Level 4 through the installation of a modular armour package.

The vehicle integrates an overpressure protection system in order to keep the crew compartments safe from chemical, biological, radiological and nuclear (CBRN) threats. The interior has air conditioning and heating for comfort, as well as an electrical device for reheating food and heating water for tea or coffee. Space has been optimized: whereas an AMX-10 RC crew has four men, with a loader to place the shells and a gunner positioned between the commander's legs, the new Jaguar is crewed by three men, a driver, a gunner and a commander, two of which are in the turret. The commander and gunner access the vehicle via two hatches located on the turret roof above their respective stations. The driver access his compartment at the front of the hull, via an armoured motorized hinged flap, opening to the right, that covers it. Once on board, the space is ample and modular, with adjustable and/or articulated seats and controls. When the 40 mm gun fires, there's little to no recoil inside, thanks to the rotating breech, reducing both risk and noise.

== Sensors and situational awareness ==
The Jaguar's attributes, which are its greatest strength, are discreet. Behind the armour, some twenty sensors serve as the crew's eyes and ears. The data collected by the optics, cameras and other electronic devices and systems are fed into the SCORPION bubble via the SICS (Système d'Information du Combat de SCORPION; English: SCORPION Combat Information System) developed by Atos-Bull and the CONTACT (COmmunications Numériques TACtiques et de Théâtre; English: Tactical and theater digital communications) developed by Thales. The former is a combat cloud (the unified combat information network) and the latter, a software defined radio system; they feature on all SCORPION vehicles. The SICS interconnects all the players in a combined arms battle group, while the CONTACT provides communication capabilities between the vehicles, with simultaneous and real time voice and data transmission. Meanwhile, the Thales-developed TopAxyz inertial measurement unit provides accurate localization and pointing information and autonomous navigation capabilities to the vehicle, including in GNSS-denied environments. One of the Jaguar 's added value features is its vetronics, i.e. the architecture of its on-board electronic systems. Also developed by Thales, the architecture is common to all SCORPION vehicles. It requires compact yet powerful computers and links all navigation, protection, observation and communication systems. It manages and merges all data within the vehicle. The SCORPION Common Vetronics ensure the processing and exchange of intra- and inter-vehicle data, enabling collaborative combat. In addition, vetronics play a decisive role in vehicle protection, thanks in particular to algorithms that offer the crew several options for dealing with a threat, allowing them to opt for the one they deem the most adequate for the situation.

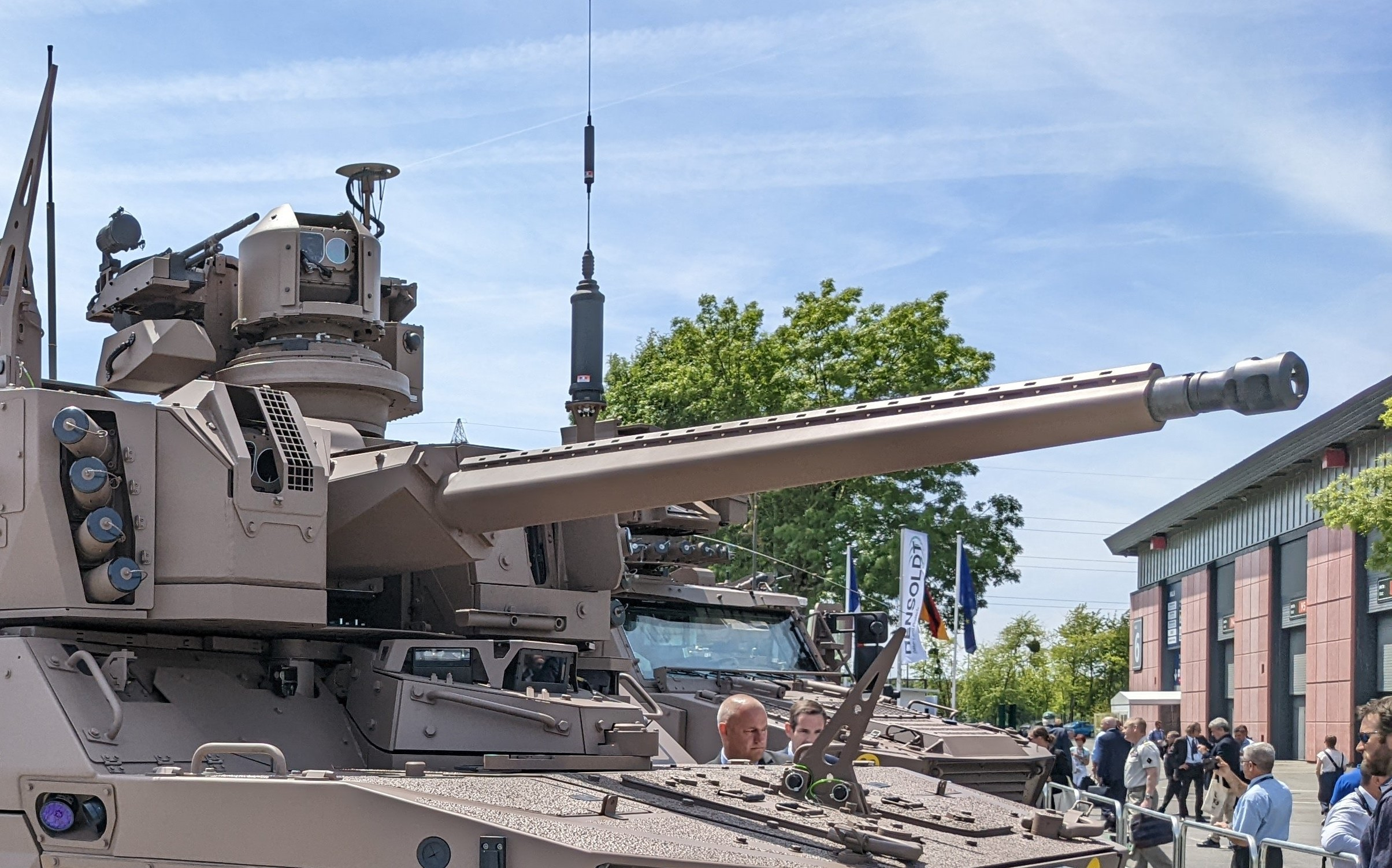
Commander's PASEO system (incorporated in an independent crown on the roof) and gunner's PASEO (visible on the turret between the smoke grenades dispenser and the cannon)

Observation and tracking are provided by Safran's PASEO all-digital optically stabilized panoramic sighting and fire-control system, which has, otherwise, only been selected to equip much heavier vehicles than the Jaguar such as the M10 Booker and especially the Leclerc XLR and AbramsX main battle tanks. This high-performance electro-optical/infrared (EO/IR) system is a long-range observation and firing sight. On the Jaguar, it is duplicated for the gunner (PASEO-T, located on the left side of the turret and aligned with the 40 mm autocannon) and vehicle commander (PASEO-C, fitted on the remote controlled weapon station). While the gunner scans the surrounding area with his system, which has the effect of rotating the turret, the commander can independently monitor another axis with his own. This, for example, enables the commander to go off in search of the next targets to neutralize, while the gunner deals with targets already designated. And if the former should spot an aggressive target deemed to be a priority, he can at any moment, at the touch of a button, execute a "rally"; the turret is then automatically and promptly aimed at this target. All that's left to do is to fire. Suited to 30 to 125 mm caliber guns and integrating anti-tank missile guidance, the PASEO provides detection, identification, targeting and firing capabilities to the Jaguar and enables the crew to engage both static and moving targets with the vehicle's full range of weapons, day and night. Its observation range is 15.4 km for target detection, 7.6 km for target recognition and 4 km for target identification. It incorporates 6 sensors, including a daylight full HD camera and the SATIS GS multi-purpose cooled thermal imager operating in the 3-5 and 8-12 μm spectra for 360° directional (azimuth) observation and from -30 to +62° in elevation. It also features a laser rangefinder that provides precise distance and target data up to a range exceeding 7 km, increasing the probability of hitting the target on the first shot. Another important capability of this system is the ability to image by sector, providing a high-quality panoramic view and high-contrast background when searching for hidden targets. The PASEO is also capable of auto-tracking; it can automatically lock onto a given target, whether on land or in the air.

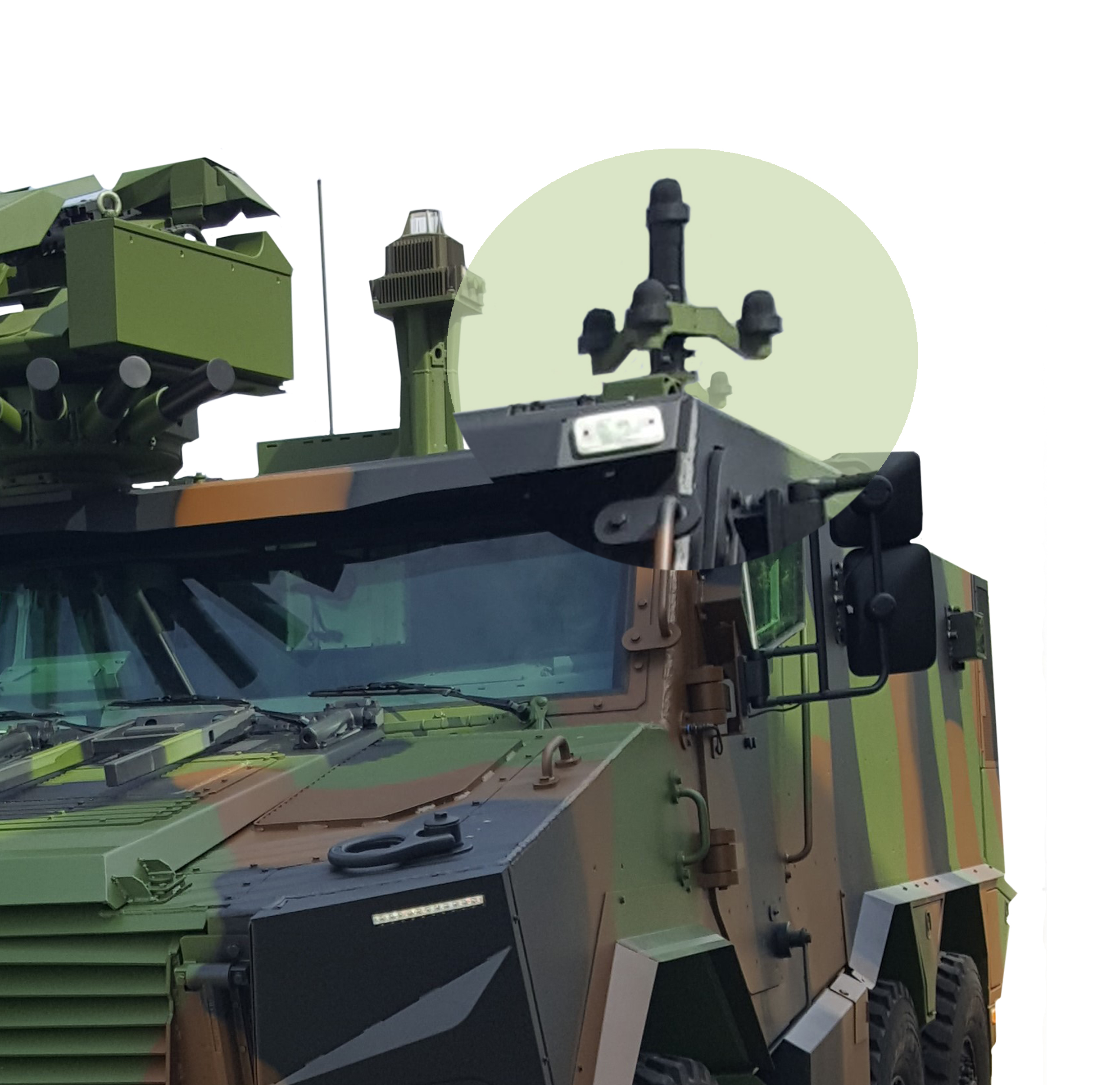
A VBMR Griffon featuring the PILAR V (encircled) and ANTARES system (to its left); both also equip the Jaguar

The Jaguar is also equipped with the ANTARES optronics system, developed by Thales, for close situational awareness and which also doubles as a laser warning receiver. Two sets are mounted on the turret (one, front right and the other, rear left) to provide all-round coverage. The system complements the PASEO and enables a vision of the area to be reconstituted on the crew's screens. The ANTARES combines precise laser warning and local situational awareness capabilities in a single electro-optical head. The module provides a 360° azimuthal field of view, day and night, and elevation coverage from -15° to +75°, which also makes it possible to spot snipers on rooftops. With a resolution of 5 million pixels, it provides colour video for daytime operations and black-and-white video for night-time operations. In daylight, the system can see an armoured vehicle at a distance of 500 m or a small drone at a distance of 250 m, and detect a human being up to 150 m away. Thanks to its built-in laser warning system, the ANTARES also issues an alert if the vehicle is targeted by a laser rangefinder or designator. It can locate laser threats to within 1.5 degrees as well as detect the launch of an incoming missile, allowing the crew to react as it sees fit. To these must be added five peripheral cameras integrated on the sides of the chassis and at the rear. Furthermore, the vehicle is equipped with backup optics for the vehicle commander and gunner if they ever were to face issues on the battlefield with their optoelectronic sensors: the gunner has a direct optical channel located on the front arc of the turret (to the left of the tube) and the commander, an all-optic panoramic sight installed at the top of the turret (front centre) which not only act as a backup sight but also enhances his topography perception. Additionally, the vehicle features the PILAR V, a roof-mounted device capable of detecting, identifying and locating shots from small arms, medium-calibre weapons, mortar shells, shaped charge rockets or RPGs in real time. It provides a 360° coverage and is always active. It can filter outgoing fire to avoid false detections and false reports to the SICS combat information system, and can detect whether single or burst shots are being fired in the vehicle's direction. The PILAR V is accurate to within 2° in azimuth and 3° in elevation, with a 10% margin for distance estimation. However, if other Jaguar or SCORPION vehicles are in the vicinity, their own PILAR V systems will detect the shot as well and can exchange the data instantly. The vetronics will then triangulate to pinpoint the shooter's position and share the information across all vehicles. The vetronics will also be able to automatically direct the turret towards this position, and propose firing among other options. The threat discrimination and precise target designation capability improves situational awareness, immediate reaction and the effectiveness of retaliatory fire.

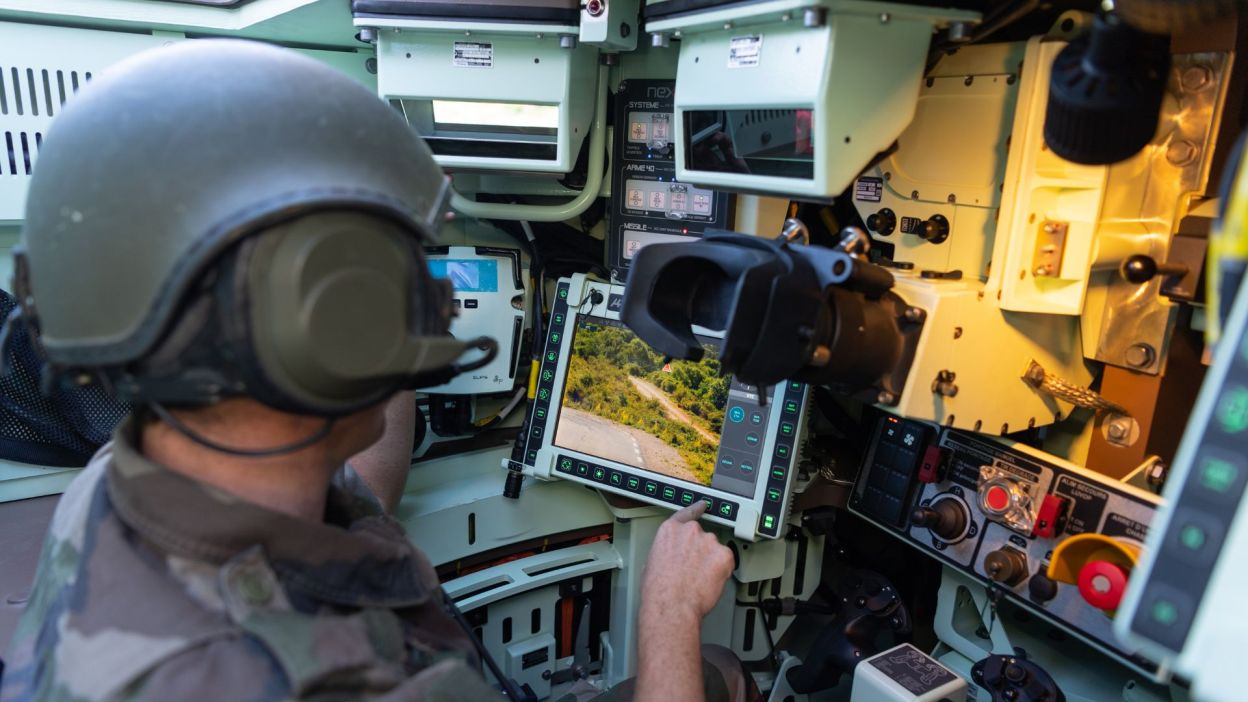
The MFD (Multi-Function Display) that equips both the commander and gunner's stations (gunner pictured)

Inside the vehicle, the commander's station is located on the right side of the turret. He has seven episcopes granting him a 360° view of the outside and two touch screens. The first screen is a multi-function display that enables the overall command of the vehicle. For example, it allows him to manage the sensors and visualize the various types of data they're gathering; lays out vehicle, armament and ammunition status and parameters; and more. It also notably features the menu for the remote-controlled machine gun as well, which the commander is expected to operate if needed. The second screen represents the SICS and is dedicated to information sharing with other SCORPION vehicles. Other tools at his disposal inside for his mission include the ocular lens linked to his backup sight, a general-purpose safety control panel (essentially a set of controls with backlit buttons) and firing authorization rockers to allow the gunner to engage targets. Meanwhile, the gunner, who sits on the left, has two episcopes granting him visibility outside. His station features a weapon safety control panel as well as his multi-function display that enables him to visualize data provided by the sensors such as video images of targets to engage, to select how to engage them (e.g. 5-shot burst, 3-shot burst, single shot...), the ammunition to use, etc. Finally, the ocular lens linked to his backup sight and a control unit (halfway between an airplane stick and a video game console's joystick) are located in front of his seat (at eye level and near his legs respectively). The control unit enables him to swiftly steer the turret (60° per second) and operate the weapons (i.e. the 40 mm autocannon and the missiles). The commander's station is also equipped with one. Both the gunner and commander's helmets are fitted with a microphone and earpieces to reduce ambient noise and facilitate internal communication via the Elips'.

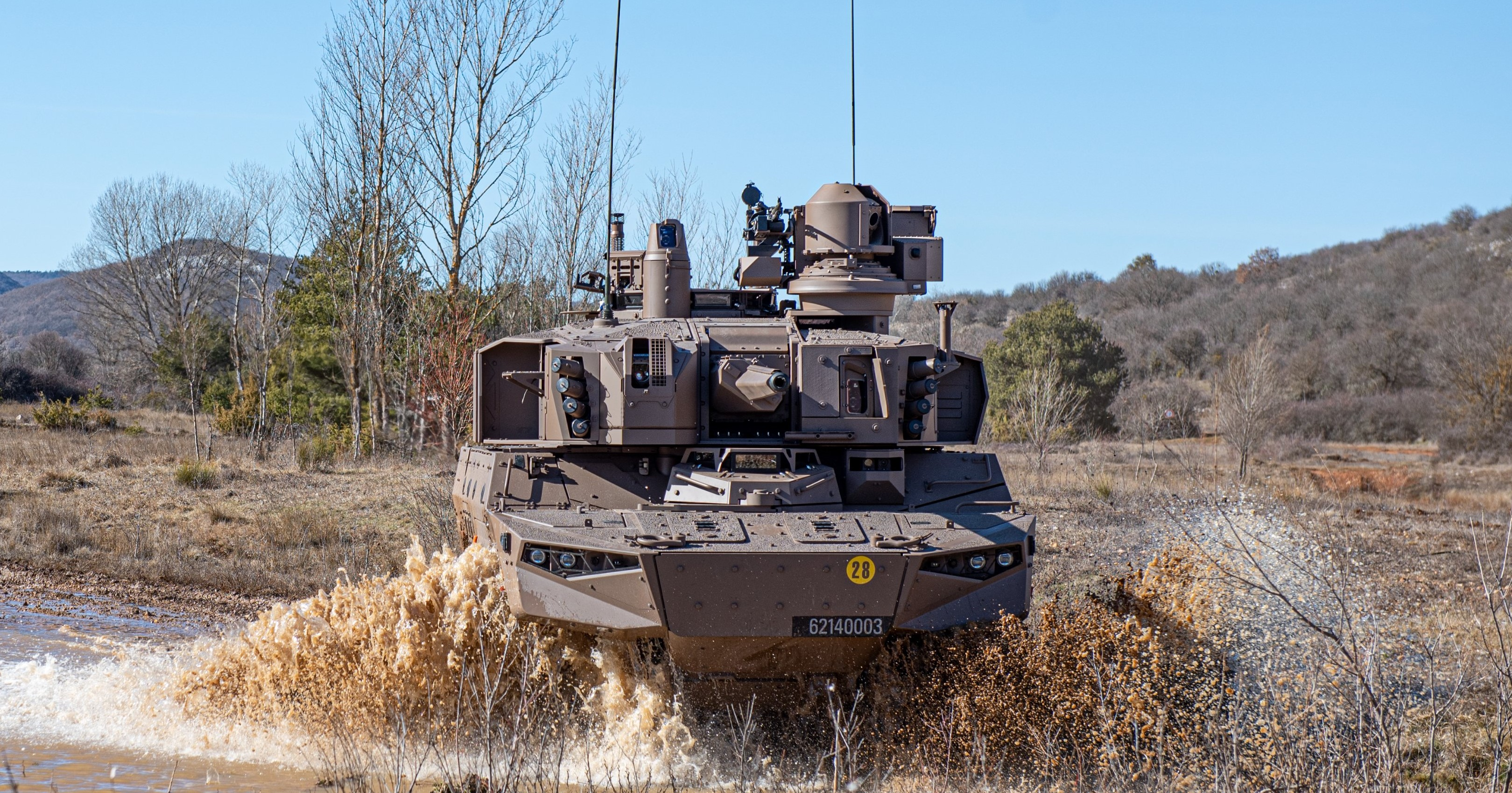
The pilot's compartment (front centre, below the turret) is covered by a motorized armoured flap that opens to the right, enabling entry and exit. It is fitted with three episcopes that grant his field of view

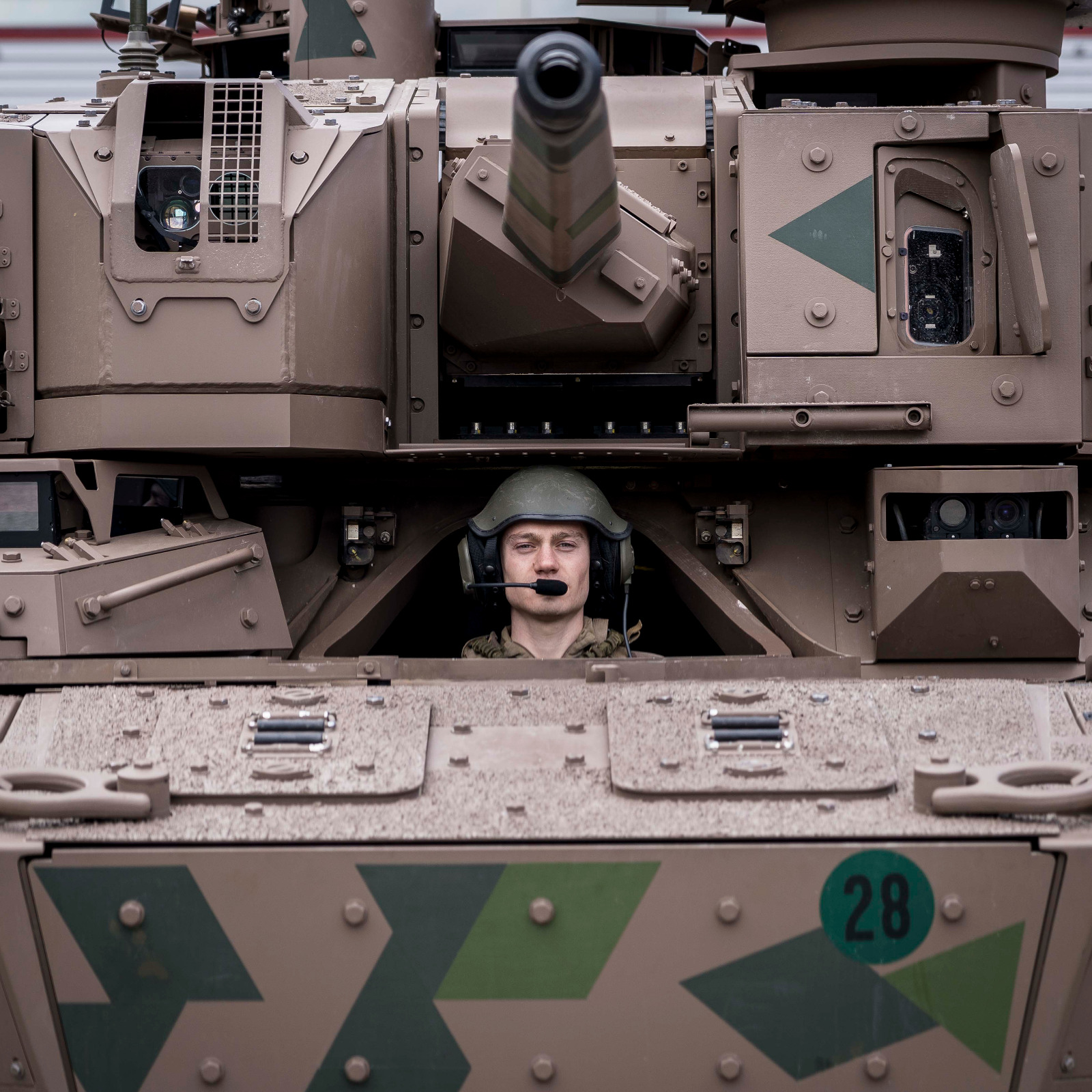
EBRC Jaguar pilot of the French Army 1st Spahi Regiment with the driver-dedicated optronics sensor at his left. Above him, integrated to the turret, are the gunner's PASEO sensor suite (driver's right) and back up optical channel (driver's left)

The driver, located at the front centre of the hull, is alone in his compartment ahead of the other two crew members but remains in constant contact with them via the radio integrated into his helmet. He pilots the vehicle from his electrically adjustable seat using a steering wheel placed in the centre of a three-part dashboard with screens; two on the left and one on the right. The latter displays all mobility parameters, while the two touch screens on the left are dedicated to driver's display, providing access to functions such as the rearview camera, navigation, air conditioning, the diagnostics system for mechanical or electronic alerts in case of issues with the vehicle and lighting parameters to remain discreet during night-time maneuvers. Now also granted the ability to observe, his field of view is provided from a closed hatch via panoramic vision blocks (essentially, an armoured motorized hinged flap sheltering him and fitted with three episcopes, which generate visibility through an interplay of mirrors). The central episcope (the biggest) can fuse in the images provided by the optronics system dedicated to the driver. This system, which consists of a thermal sensor and a light intensification one, is integrated on the left of the flap that covers his compartment (and located just below the gunner's optical channel), and notably enables night driving. But the driver nonetheless retains the ability to drive with his head outside if he wishes.

Precision and detection distance have thus been vastly improved over the AMX-10 RC, with the proximal cameras, high-quality optics and the addition of the thermal channel, plus the set of episcopes, five of which are augmented reality. The decision-making loop is reduced thanks to the latter. Some of the data collected by the sensors and processed by the combat information system are projected directly onto the episcopes, enabling the crew to stay one step ahead in their understanding of the tactical situation and accelerate the sequencing of an action. By virtue of the SICS and the information sharing it induces, target designation by a friendly vehicle or air asset, for example, will be displayed on three augmented reality episcopes for the vehicle commander, one for the gunner and one for the driver.

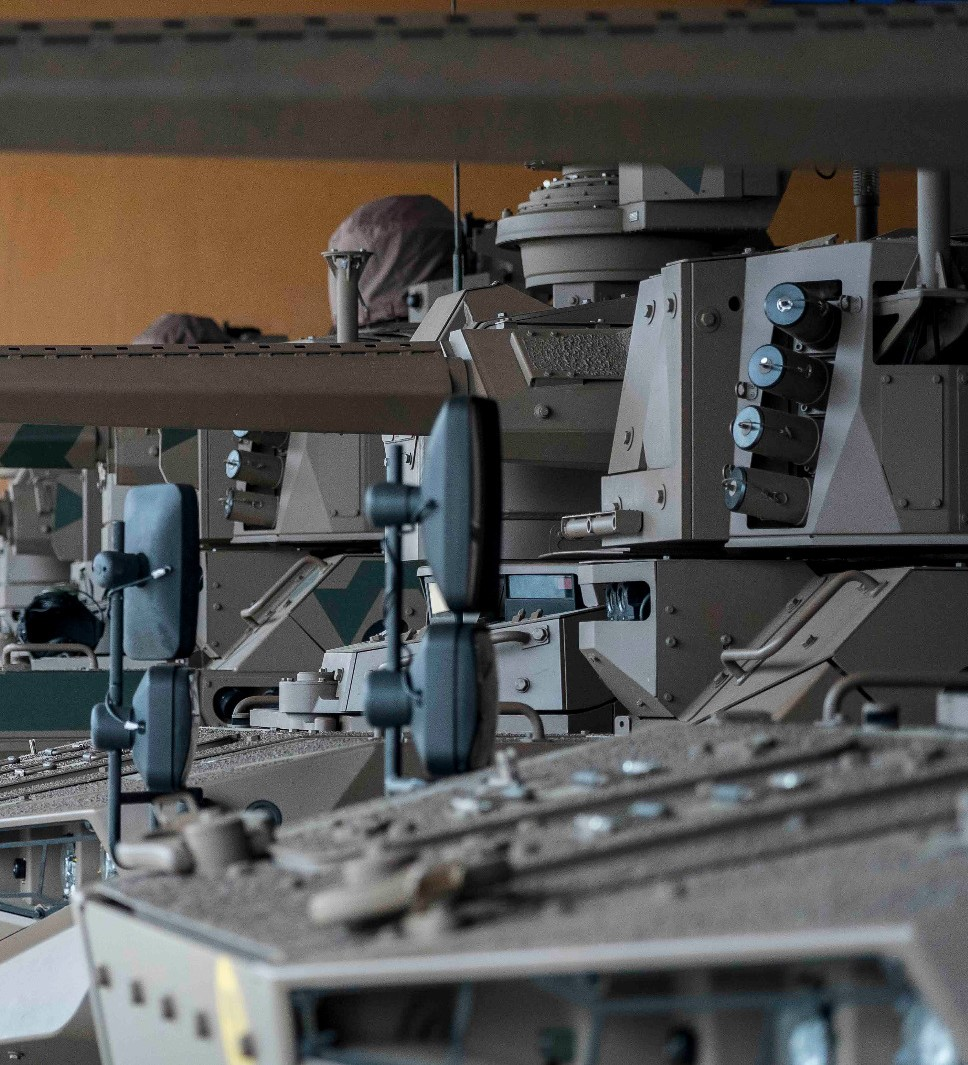
Four of the fourteen GALIX system's smoke grenade dischargers integrated to an EBRC Jaguar

Beyond countermeasures such as the aforementioned laser alert detector, missile launch detector and gunfire locator, the Jaguar also integrates, for example, an infrared jammer as well as an anti-IED jamming sensor despite coming with STANAG 4569 Level 4 armour as standard. The ECLIPSE, a smart software defined jammer developed by Thales, provides electronic protection against IED/RCIED threats. It instantly detects and responds to the triggering of improvised explosive devices by jamming radio remote control signals across a wide range of frequencies without interfering with the radio communication systems used by friendly forces. The Jaguar is also fitted with the GALIX countermeasure system developed and manufactured by Lacroix Defense, in collaboration with Nexter. The system consists of 14 80 mm smoke grenade dispensers linked to the turret-mounted ANTARES laser warning system. It operates alongside the missile launch detector, the PILAR V, the ECLIPSE and the infrared jammer. 4 grenades are mounted at the front of the turret on each side, with 3 embedded into the armour at the rear of the hull at both ends as well. The GALIX is a self-protection system that makes vehicle protection more reliable through an automatic detection action, which drastically reduces protection engagement time by automating the decision phase. When a shot is detected within a 5 km radius, the sensors transfer threat and angle-of-attack data to the vehicle's fire-control system. In response, the GALIX will launch multispectral countermeasures in less than a second, capable of disrupting the opposing gunner. Essentially, the grenades deploy a cloud of smoke that mask the vehicle in visible range as well as all laser wavebands (target designators, laser rangefinders, etc.) and large infrared bands (0.8-14 microns) covering bands I, III and IV. This non-toxic protective cloud lasts up to 90 seconds and is created from ground level up to a maximum height of 7 metres and to a distance of between 20 and 60 metres from the vehicle. Furthermore, the system is designed not only for self-defense (passive action), but is also capable of neutralizing of hostile personnel (as it can fire a variety of lethal and non-lethal charges). Countermeasures yet to equip the vehicle include an active protection system; one is being developed by Thales and Nexter for integration on SCORPION vehicles under the PROMETEUS (PROtection Multi Effets Terrestre Unifiée; English: Unified terrestrial multi-effect protection) programme, which aims to develop a global armour protection system for SCORPION vehicles combining three technologies: "versatile passive protection", "reactive protection" and "active protection". The latter, designated Diamant, is a distributed hard-kill active protection system being developed by Thales comprising four frequency-modulated continuous-wave radar sensors mounted on the corners of the vehicle, a number of effector modules mounted around the perimeter of the vehicle, on its roof and around its hood, and a power supply system for the control unit computer. The system uses the radars to detect and track potential threats such as anti-tank rockets and anti-tank guided missiles. Once the threat has been detected, the system instructs the appropriate effector module to launch a countermeasure along the threat's trajectory, in order to destroy or degrade it sufficiently so that it can no longer perforate the vehicle's passive armor.

The Jaguar is also designed to simplify maintenance. The vehicles are fitted with sensors on key components, such as suspension, brake pads and gearboxes, enabling predictive maintenance. The principle is to deploy Health and Usage Monitoring Systems (HUMS) on these key functions to generate continuous data on vehicle activity. This data is stored and analyzed to determine remaining potential, anticipate breakdowns and program interventions at the right moment. This method, one of several being explored as part of the MCO-T 2025 plan, is intended to help streamline support operations and improve vehicle availability. HUMS sensors can, for example, take the form of a dynamic engine oil quality control system. This control tool will allow oil changes to be carried out when necessary, rather than systematically after a set number of kilometers. The adoption of predictive maintenance, agreed in a rider to the SCORPION contract, meant developing the software layer needed to coordinate sensors and analyze data. SCORPION vehicles are the first in the French military designed to be equipped with HUMS sensors; adding this capability is therefore not a complex operation. The maneuver is also closely linked to the SERUM (Système d'Entretien et de Réparation Unique du Maintenancier; English: Maintainer's Unique Maintenance and Repair System) cases developed by Arquus. This diagnostic tool takes the form of a computer which can be plugged into the vehicle to perform maintenance operations or identify faults.

For the rest, the Jaguar works as a kit. A total of fifteen different kits are available, including a winch system and additional sensors.

== Armament ==
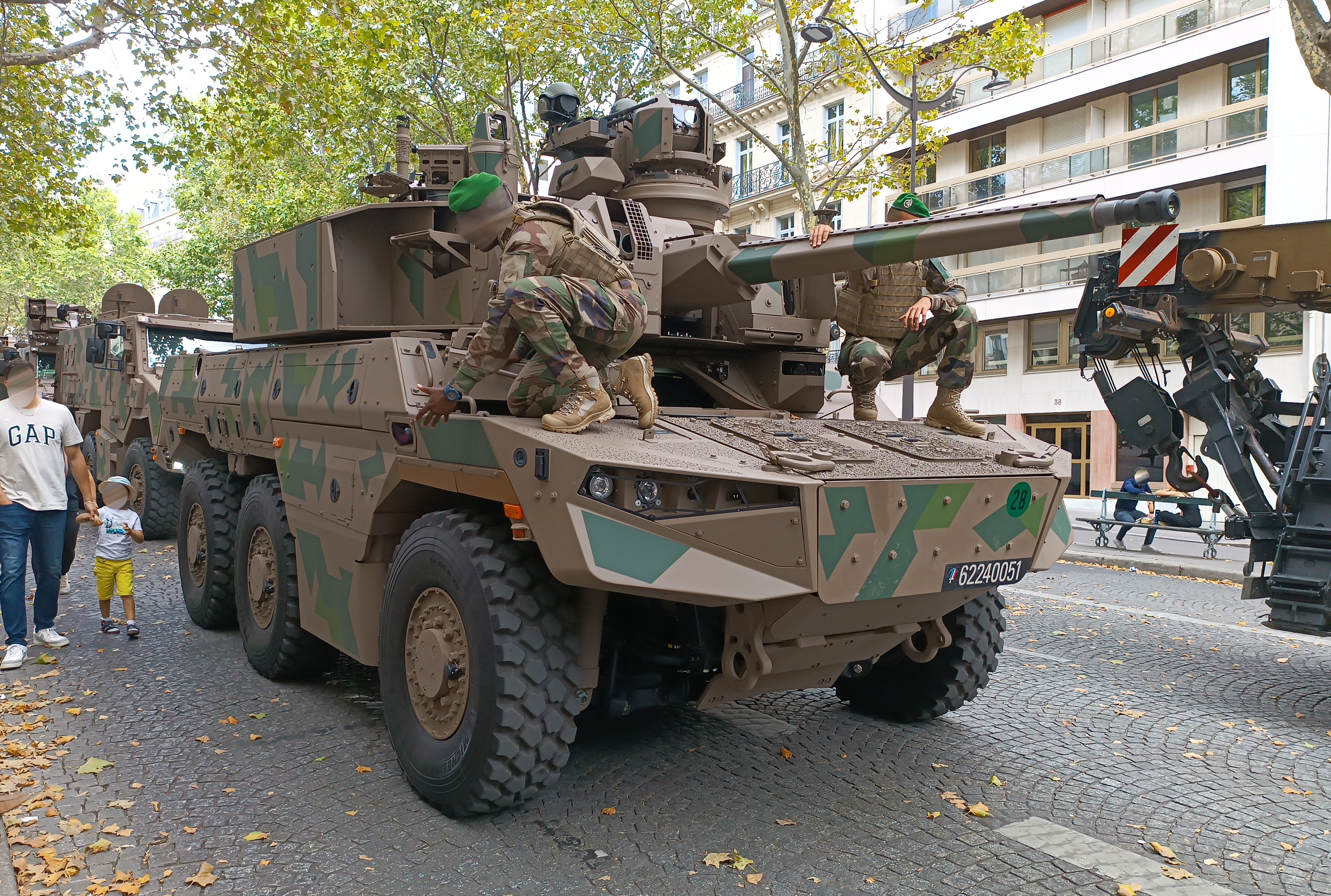
The Jaguar's 40 mm Cased Telescoped Cannon (40CTC)

A combat vehicle first and foremost, the Jaguar integrates three types of armament; firstly, the two-man stabilized 40CTAS (40 mm Cased Telescoped Armament System) turret developed by CTA International, with its 40 mm autocannon (the 40CTC) and Ammunition Handling System (AHS). Innovative and compact thanks to its push-through architecture, this gun does not require a large intrusion into the vehicle body and features a high elevation of 45°, giving the Jaguar the ability to handle "slow aircraft", as required. While in 2009, the French Army mainly had helicopters or targets in high structures in urban terrain in mind, the same logic now applies to UAVs. The 40CTC has a rate of fire of 200 rounds per minute and tilts from -10° to 45°.

The turret is fully stabilized in azimuth and elevation thanks to the Gun Control Equipment (GCE), which enables the vehicle to fire on the move. The GCE includes elevation and azimuth drive motors, encoders, gyroscopes, accelerometers and electronic control units. The gunner has a choice of 180 telescoped shells, 65 of which are ready-to-fire rounds. The French Army has selected four types of ammunition: practice shells (the General Purpose Round – Kinetic Energy – Tracer or GPR-KE-T, and Target Practice – Tracer or TP-T), the Armour Piercing Fin Stabilised Discarding Sabot-Tracer (APFSDS-T), the General Purpose Round – Point Detonating – Tracer (GPR-PD-T) and the General Purpose Round – Airburst – Tracer (GPR-AB-T). The APFSDS-T shell has an effective firing range of up to 3 km and the other three, up to 2.5 km. The TP-T and GPR-KE-T practice shells are already qualified and in service. The GPR-PD-T shell is expected to be qualified in 2022 and the fourth munition, the GPR-AB-T, in 2023.

The Jaguar's 40 mm gun is thus capable of piercing enemy vehicle armour (the tungsten projectile of the APFSDS-T is notably able to penetrate more than 140 mm of RHA at 1.5 km), of breaching more than 210 mm of double-reinforced concrete or delivering an air-bursting detonation above a target at a range of 60 m to 2.5 km, forming a volley of projectiles as threatening to entrenched personnel as to airborne vehicles. This programmable high-explosive munition can also operate in point detonating mode.

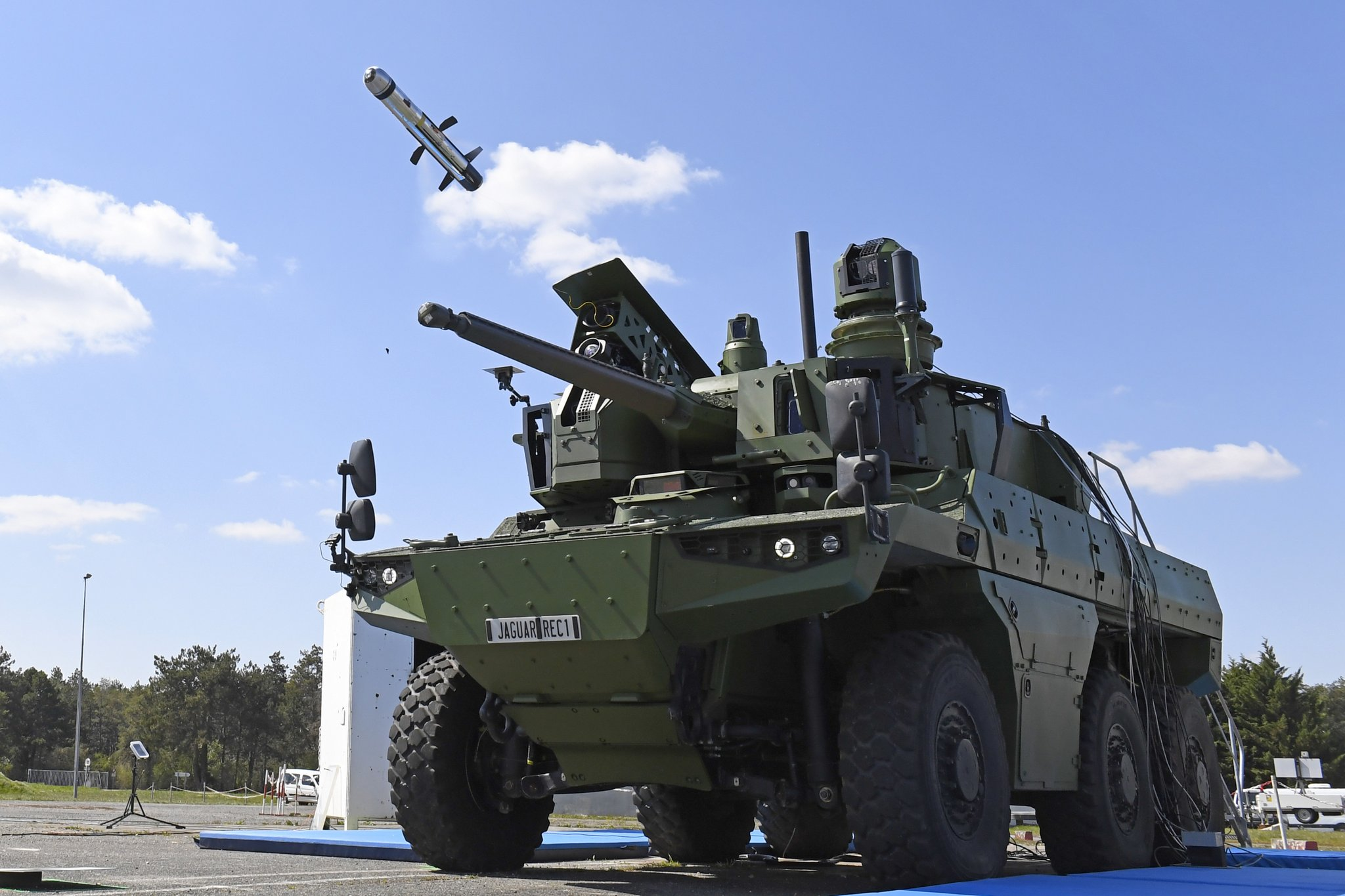
The first firing of an Akeron MP medium-range missile by the EBRC Jaguar during the vehicle's qualification trials, 2021

Complementing the 40CTAS system, the Akeron MP missile, developed by MBDA France, provides medium-range anti-tank and surface-to-surface missile capabilities should the Jaguar engage fixed or moving heavier targets such as latest-generation main battle tanks or heavily protected structures. It can destroy a tank up to 5 km away without being hampered by the landscape. The missile's beyond line-of-sight capability enables it to strike targets behind an obstacle. The missile also grants the ability to change target in flight to deal with an unexpected threat thanks to an integrated aiming recopy. The Akeron MP arming the Jaguar is, like the 40CTAS, guided by the gunner's PASEO. It has three main operating modes: fire-and-forget; Lock-on before launch (LOBL), which locks on to a target before firing; Lock-on after launch (LOAL), which locks on to a target after firing and enables non-line-of-sight (NLOS) strikes. Two missiles are ready for firing in the deployable pod on the right-hand side of the turret. A further two rounds are stored in the turret neck, a location less subject to vibration. This marks a return in the French Army to cannon-missile pairing, a configuration not seen since the 1960s and the adoption of the AMX-13 SS.11.

The Jaguar is equipped with the T3 Hornet S remote controlled weapon station, the most sophisticated of the Hornet family designed and manufactured by Arquus. It is armed with an FN MAG 58 7.62 mm machine gun, still effective at 800 metres, with 550 rounds of ammunition ready to fire. It differs from the T1 Hornet and T2 Hornet Lite mounted on the Griffon and Serval in its architecture as unlike the other two models, this remotely-operated turret features the PASEO sight integrated on an independent crown that can be operated by both the vehicle commander and the gunner (although, typically by the former). The T3 hornet S turret has 360° rotation capability, with elevation from -20° to +60°, and operates on three axes: one for the PASEO, the second for the machine gun and the third for the 40CT 40 mm autocannon.

Each SCORPION vehicle's remote controlled weapon station is a contributor to the intelligence acquisition and sharing chain. As common SCORPION equipment, they are the "eyes" of collaborative combat. Each remotely-operated turret is integrated into the vehicle's vetronics, which is linked to the other elements of a company team or GTIA (in the French Army, a GTIA is a combined arms battlegroup composed of a little over 1,000 men) via the SICS combat information system. This facilitates the sharing of tactical information in real time, allowing every section to have a precise idea of the situation of friendly vehicles and enabling SCORPION Vehicle A (whether a Griffon, Serval, Jaguar or Leclerc XLR) to engage a target identified by SCORPION Vehicle B. If, for example, a Griffon spots an enemy target, it can instantaneously communicate its position to a Jaguar so that it can move to destroy it with its 40 mm cannon or missiles.

To avoid them being potentially disoriented by the swiftness of the turret's movements, the gunner and his leader benefit from a rosette at the top of their multi-function screens, indicating the orientation of each weapon/sight in relation to the chassis; a detail that seems simple but, once again, represents an improvement over the AMX-10 RC, which lacked one.

== Operators ==
=== Current operators ===
Belgium (1 + 59 on order)
60 units ordered by the Belgian Army in 2018, after having approved the CaMo programme in 2017.
The deliveries were planned for 2025 - 2030.
The first delivery took place in November 2026.
France (93 delivered, firm order of 150, total planned of 300)
Orders:
- 2017: 20 Jaguar ordered in April
- 2020: 42 Jaguar ordered in September, bringing the total firm orders to 62
- 2022: 88 Jaguar ordered in May, bringing the total firm orders to 150
Deliveries:
- 2021: 20 delivered by the end of that year
- 2022: 18 delivered, making a total of 38 delivered to the French Army
- 2023: 22 delivered, making a total of 60 delivered to the French Army
- 2024: 34 planned to be delivered, which would bring the total delivered to the French Army to 93
- 2025: 42 planned to be delivered, which would bring the total delivered to the French Army to 135
- 2030: 103 planned to be delivered from 2026 to 2030, which would bring the total delivered to the French Army to 238
- 2035: 62 planned to be delivered from 2031 to 2035, which would bring the total delivered to the French Army to 300

=== Future operators ===
France (150)
150 more are approved for order.
Of these 150, 50 are planned to be delivered by 2030, and 100 by 2035.
Luxembourg (38)
The intent to procure the SCORPION vehicles, including 38 EBRC Jaguar, was announced in May 2024.
The Luxembourg parliament approved the purchase in November 2024. The contract was signed in December 2025.
Planned for delivery from 2028.

== In popular culture ==
The EBRC Jaguar is featured in the 2021 first-person shooter Battlefield 2042, where it is referred to as the EBAA Wildcat. In the game, it is operated by both the American and Russian factions.

The EBRC Jaguar was also featured in the 2013 free-to-play vehicular combat multiplayer video game War Thunder as part of the major “Spearhead” update, where it appears as a French Rank VII light tank (battle rating 11.0).
