= CTA International =

Joint-venture European armaments company

CTA International is an equal-shares joint venture company between defence companies Nexter and BAE Systems. CTAI is based in Bourges, France, and has been established to develop and manufacture case telescoped weapons and ammunition. The company name is an acronym for Case Telescoped Ammunition. Its main product is the 40CTAS for armoured fighting vehicles such as armoured reconnaissance vehicles and infantry fighting vehicles.

== Timeline ==
- 1994 - CTAI was created by (at that time) GIAT and Royal Ordnance, with initial activities around a 45mm solution
- 1997 - the 40mm calibre solution is selected
- 1999 - The UK MoD Operational Analysis (OA) study output is shared with US DoD; the solution is integrated into Bradley Fighting Vehicle and the US-UK Tracer prototype vehicle
- 2002 - Further UK MoD & DGA OA studies; risk reduction contract awarded
- 2004 - UK MoD & DGA contract to integrate 40CT into the MTIP and unmanned Toutatis turrets
- March 2008 - UK MoD select CT40 as a mandated item for Warrior IFV and FRES-Scout (now Ajax) programmes
- April 2017: France orders the first tranche of the EBRC Jaguar
- 26 November 2021 : British MoD receives the 515 and last 40CT cannon ordered.
