= VBMR-L Serval =

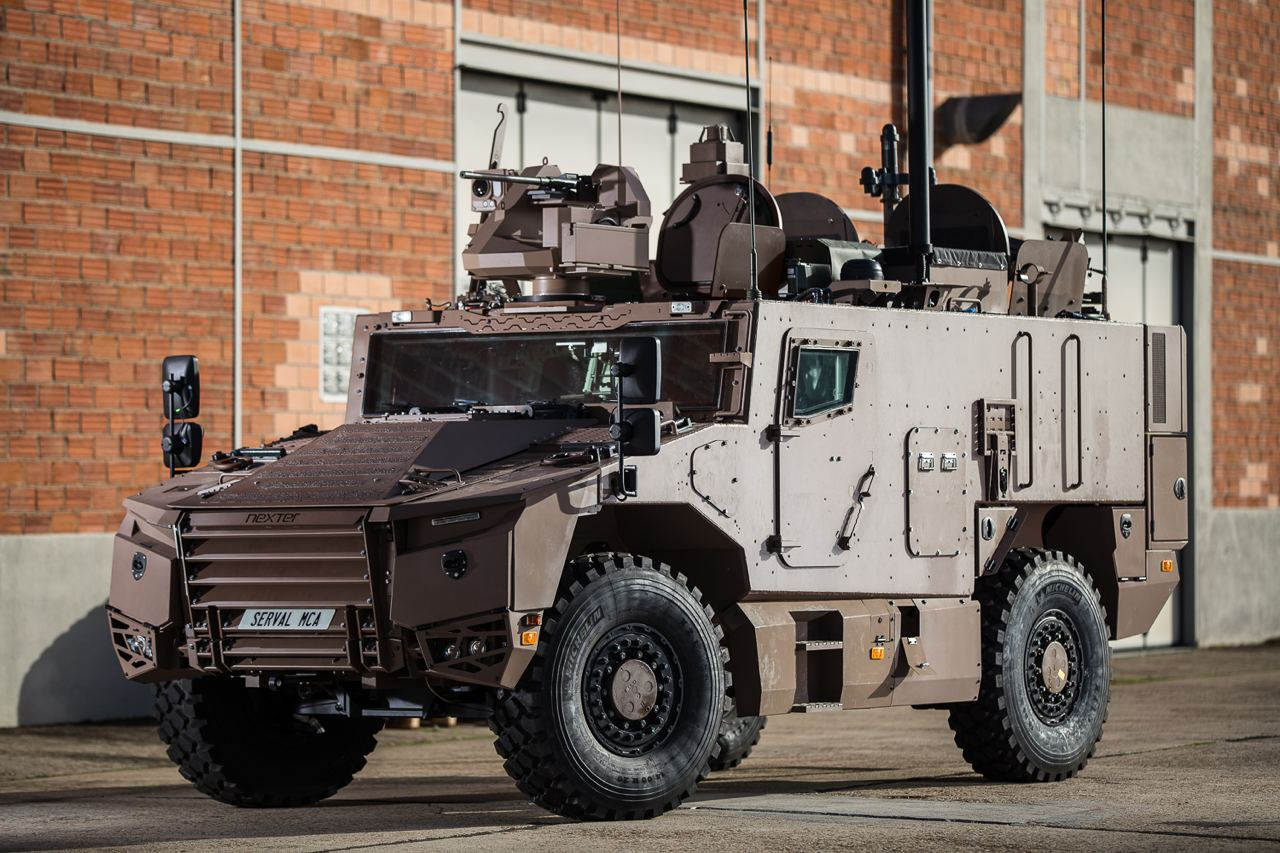
- A VBMR-L Serval (May 2022)
- Type: Multirole Infantry mobility vehicle (IMV)
- Place of origin: France

Service history
- In service: 2022 - present
- Used by: France

Production history
- Designer: Nexter(now KNDS France); Texelis
- Designed: 2018 - 2021
- Manufacturer: KNDS France; Texelis
- Unit cost: Serval VPB (standard): €1.2 million (FY2021)
- Produced: 2021 - present
- No. built: 189 units as of 31 December 2023
- Variants: Armoured patrol, ISTAR, communications relay, electronic warfare, and associated subvariants

Specifications
- Mass: 15.0 to 17.0 t (33,100 to 37,500 lb)
- Length: 6.50 m (21 ft 4 in)
- Width: 2.53 m (8 ft 4 in)
- Height: 2.46 m (8 ft 1 in) (roof); 3.5 m (11 ft 6 in) (turret)
- Crew: 2 to 3 (driver / commander / gunner, depending on variants)
- Passengers: Up to 8
- Armour: STANAG 4569 Level 4 (standard); Additional modular armour kits (optional)
- Main armament: RCWS: T1 Hornet, T2 Hornet Lite, FN deFNder (7.62 mm, 12.7 mm, 40×53 mm HV); Anti-tank: Akeron MP ATGM; Air-defence: MANPADS: Mistral 3, ARX 30 RWS C-UAS; Mortars: LLR 81, MO-120 RT
- Secondary armament: Self-protection smoke grenade discharger: 8×80 mm GALIX (on all French variants)
- Engine: Cummins ISLe375-30 inline-six, 8.9 litre diesel engine 375 hp (280 kW); 1,550 N⋅m (1,140 lbf⋅ft)
- Power/weight: 22.1 hp/t (16.5 kW/t) (at maximum mass)
- Transmission: Allison 3000 Series automatic gearbox (6 forward, 1 backward)
- Suspension: Texelis TXP 14 chassis, all-wheel drive, with Timoney / Texelis T700 axles (with independent suspensions)
- Operational range: 600 km (370 mi)
- Maximum speed: 100 km/h (62 mph)

The Véhicule Blindé Multi-Rôle Léger Serval (English: Lightweight Multirole Armoured Vehicle Serval) or VBMR-L Serval is an Infantry mobility vehicle intended as a replacement for the Véhicule de l'Avant Blindé (VAB), thus complementing the heavy VBMR Griffon. Weighing in at 17 tonnes in combat order, the Serval is roughly 25% heavier than the VAB. Four-wheeled and designed to operate in areas of contact with the enemy, the vehicle is particularly maneuverable and will primarily equip infantry units of light brigades such as the 11th Airborne Brigade and 27th Mountain Infantry Brigade.

The contract for the vehicle's development was awarded in February 2018 to Nexter and Texelis. 489 units are expected to be delivered by 2025 and 978 by 2030. Beyond the 978 Serval to be acquired through the SCORPION programme, 1,060 additional Serval vehicles are to be ordered under the VLTP-P segment haut programme and delivered by 2035. The latter are expected to be deployed within the land forces to reinforce the support and back-up resources of SCORPION units.

== SCORPION programme ==
=== Development ===
The two SCORPION vehicles that preceded the Serval facilitated the latter's rapid development, which only took 3 years, as well as its average cost of acquisition of just €1.2 million per vehicle (FY2021); as is the case with the Griffon, this is much less than such a vehicle would've cost had it been developed as a stand-alone project. Like the Griffon, the Serval can embark a combat group of up to 10 men and integrates the same equipment, in particular the vetronics, threat detectors and SICS combat information system, enabling it to be integrated into the SCORPION collaborative combat network. In its base VPB variant, it is equipped with either a remotely-operated gyro-stabilized T2 Hornet Lite turret armed with a 7.62 mm machine gun or the T1 Hornet armed with either a 7.62 mm or 12.7 mm machine gun. Both turrets are also fitted with the GALIX countermeasure system.

According to Nexter, the Serval's dimensions enable it to be easily deployed in external theaters, since an A400M can carry 2 Serval in combat order, in comparison to just 1 Griffon or Jaguar. In May 2022, the first 4 units were delivered to the French Army and 189 units by the end of 2023.

=== Configurations ===
The Serval under the SCORPION programme will be available in four main variants: VPB (armored patrol vehicle), SA2R (surveillance-target acquisition-intelligence-reconnaissance), NCT (tactical communications node) and GE (electronic warfare). The Serval VPB, the most common variant, will consist of up to 10 subvariants, most of them comparable to those adopted for the Griffon VTT family: Infanterie (light infantry carrier, notably airborne and mountain infantry), MMP (medium-range missile), EPC (command post), OA (artillery observation), MO81 (81 mm dismounted mortar), MO120 (120 mm towed mortar), GEN (combat engineering), SAN (medical evacuation), RAV (refuelling) and SATCP (dismounted Mistral 3 very short-range surface-to-air missile system).

The Serval SA2R consists of intelligence processing (Serval TDR) and acquisition (Serval ACQ) subvariants. The latter carries a Thales MURIN ground observation radar and additionally integrates an electro-optical/infrared (EO/IR) system. As for the Serval NCT, it is indicative of the efforts made to bring the theater network under armour and make it mobile. It will be based on four subvariants whose specificity will be to be able to communicate whether static (on-the-pause / OTP) or on the move (on-the-move / OTM).

At the end of 2023, the DGA ordered 420 additional Serval vehicles as a follow-up to the first order of 364 units in 2020. This new order will enable new capabilities, notably the acquisition of the electronic warfare variant, in addition to the previous three.

=== VLTP-P segment haut programme ===
Identical to the Serval being delivered to the SCORPION units, the vehicles to be acquired under the Véhicule Léger Tactique Polyvalent Protégé segment haut (English: Multi-purpose light tactical vehicles - protected high segment) programme are intended to equip "combat and support units in contact with the SCORPION environment".

"Already available, already qualified, already tried and tested in more ways than one", according to the French Army's Technical Section (STAT), the Serval has been chosen to form the "high protected" segment of the VLTP range of vehicles. It will be replacing various types of unarmoured vehicles among support regiments at brigade, division or joint level. While the common aim is to modernize and standardize, the SCORPION and VLTP P segment haut each retain their own timetable and budget. The first units of the 1,060 Serval VLTP-P vehicles (10 Serval PC ATLAS for the artillery) are expected to be delivered in 2025.

=== Air defence platforms ===
Of all the applications envisaged for the Serval, surface-to-air defence and anti-drone warfare are the latest introduced; functions anticipated by the French Army to fill the gap left by its current patchwork of specialized equipment but finally brought to the fore by the 2024-2030 LPM. The latter calls for the entry into service of 12 counter-UAV (Serval LAD) and 24 very short-range air defence (Serval Mistral) systems by 2030, as well as "at least" 40 and 45 systems respectively by 2035. In the absence of clearly defined requirements as of 2023 for the Serval LAD, the team led by Nexter is working on several concepts. Weapon systems under consideration for its armament range from 40 mm automatic grenade launchers to 30 mm autocannons. Two paths are envisaged; one based on several carriers and the other on an "all-in-one" solution. The former would have the merit of carrying more powerful sensors, like an X-band radar capable of detecting threats several tens of kilometers away, discriminating appropriately and anticipating more accurately. This proposal implies a solution on the "heavy" side, which will depend on robust communications. Some have deemed the equation rather antithetical to high-intensity warfare, which means maintaining combat capability with disrupted, degraded or possibly even destroyed resources. Complex and costly, this concept seems to be disappearing in favor of a single vehicle capable of acting autonomously to compensate for any failure in the chain of command, a prime target for an adversary on equal terms. The Serval equipped with a ARX 30 remotely-operated turret, which was unveiled by Nexter in 2022 as a scale model, is thus increasingly considered the likely solution to be adopted. Development of the ARX 30 remote controlled weapons station benefitted from the work carried on the RapidFire system by Nexter and Thales for the French Navy. Unveiled at the end of 2021, this turret is designed around the 30M781 30 mm cannon arming the Tiger attack helicopter. The system is expected to benefit from intelligent ammunition tailored for anti-UAV missions. Two programmable airburst munitions are under development, one timed and the other proximity-fired. Nexter is also pushing for the idea of a hybrid solution, proportional to the threat and operational context. Alongside the 30 mm cannon may come the NEROD RF anti-drone jamming rifle from French company MC2 Technologies. There remains the central issue of target detection and tracking as the sensors to be associated with the platform are yet to be decided as of August 2023.

Replacing, among others, the PAMELA system, the Serval Mistral will have the dual mission of providing fixed and accompanying surface-to-air defence. Two Mistral-based concepts will coexist. The first is the aforementioned Serval SATCP subvariant within the SCORPION program and is already qualified. It is the only one operational as of 2023 and is based on dismounted Mistral stations. The other concept, soon to be "resurrected", represents the Serval Mistral, which integrates an ATLAS RC remotely-operated turret on the vehicle, thus granting the ability to accompany the advance and carry out fire actions while remaining on board. According to initial plans, this turret will carry "at least two" Mistral 3 missiles" in addition to defensive armament. The STAT points out that the French Army will then have no delay in setting up the battery, eliminating all that this implies in terms of vulnerability. The Serval Mistral will carry the entire environment needed to build up complete capabilities, including an X-band radar for detection and a specific command component for deconfliction logics.

== List of variants and subvariants ==
=== VBMR-L Serval Scorpion ===
- VPB: Armoured patrol vehicle
  - Infanterie: Light infantry carrier
  - MMP: Medium-range missile platform
  - MO81: 81 mm dismounted mortar
  - MO120: 120 mm towed mortar
  - SATCP: Dismounted very short-range surface-to-air missile system
  - EPC: Command post
  - OA: Artillery observation
  - GEN: Combat engineering
  - SAN: Medical evacuation
  - RAV: Refuelling
- SA2R: ISTAR vehicle
  - ACQ: acquisition
  - TDR: intelligence processing
- NCT: Tactical communications node vehicle
- GE: Electronic warfare vehicle

=== VLTP P Serval ===
- Serval LAD
- Serval Mistral/TCP

== Operators ==
=== Current operators ===
France (978)
Planned total orders:
- Programme VBMR-L Serval Scorpion: 978 planned
- Programme VLTP P Serval: 1,060 planned
Orders:
- Programme VBMR-L Serval Scorpion
  - Tranche 1, 2020, 364 Serval ordered
  - Tranche 2, 2023, 420 Serval ordered
  - Tranche 3, 2024, 97 Serval ordered
- Programme VLTP P Serval
  - Tranche 1, 2024, 530 Serval ordered
Deliveries:
- 2022: 60 delivered
- 2023: 129 delivered, making a total of 189 delivered to the French Army

Planned deliveries
- 2024, 103 planned to be delivered
- By 2025, 489 will be delivered
- By 2030:
  - 978 Serval Scorpion
  - 36 VLTP P Serval:
    - 12 Serval LAD
    - 24 Serval Mistral
- By 2035
  - 978 Serval Scorpion
  - 1,060 VLTP P Serval
    - 40 Serval LAD
    - 45 Serval Mistral(TCP

=== Future operators ===
Croatia (15)
15 ordered with 18 Caesar Mk2 from the Croatian Army in December 2025.
The Serval are intended for command posts and observation teams for the artillery.
Luxembourg (5)
The Luxembourg parliament approved the purchase in November 2024.
It includes:
- 2 command vehicles for the headquarters (état-major)
- 2 APC for the squadrons
- 1 for training (driving, turret, communication systems)

=== Potential orders ===
Belgium (123)
123 are planned to be ordered, it was approved by the Belgian parliament in December 2025 (CaMo Phase 3).
Cyprus
The Cyprus National Guard is reportedly considering the purchase of 100 Serval along with 80 Griffon vehicles.
France (1,060)
1,060 additional Serval vehicles to be purchased under the VLTP P segment haut programme and delivered by 2035.
Ireland
The Irish Army seems to have shown interest in the VBMR-L Serval.
