= 40CT cannon =

40CTC
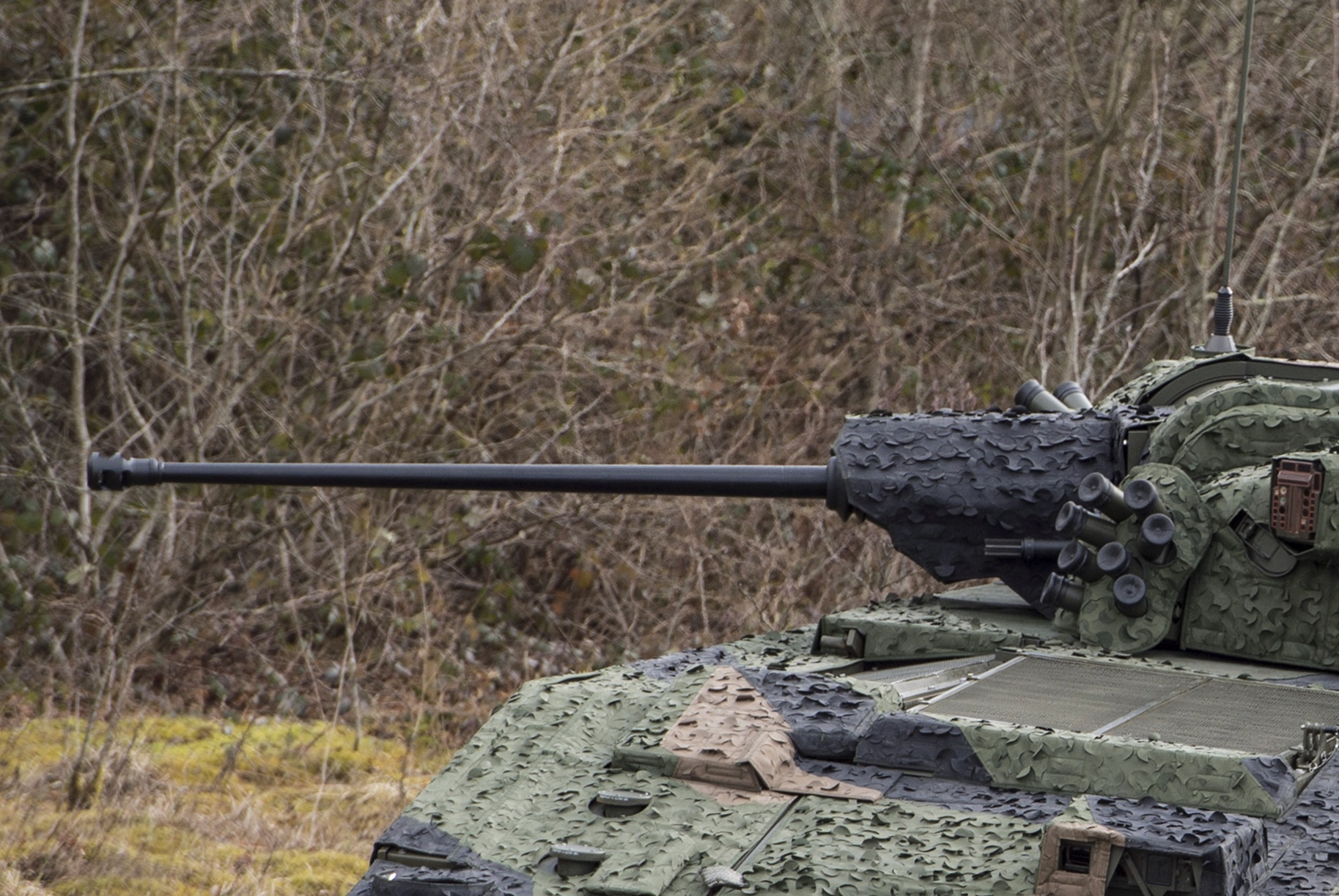
- 40CTC of a British Ajax armoured fighting vehicle
- Type: Cased telescoped autocannon
- Place of origin: France; United Kingdom

Service history
- In service: 2022–present
- Used by: British Army; French Armed Forces

Production history
- Designer: CTA International
- Designed: 1997–2022
- Manufacturer: CTA International

Specifications
- Mass: 340 kg (750 lb)
- Length: 3,428 mm (11 ft 3.0 in)
- Barrel length: 2,800 mm (110 in)
- Cartridge: 40×255 mm
- Caliber: 40 mm (1.6 in)
- Action: Recoil-operated, rotating breech
- Rate of fire: 200 rpm
- Effective firing range: 2,500 m (8,200 ft) (4,000 m (13,000 ft) for the Thales RapidFire naval CIWS)
- Maximum firing range: 8,500 m (27,900 ft)
- Feed system: Automatic Ammunition Handling System (AHS)

The 40CTC (40 mm Cased Telescoped Cannon) is a 40 mm autocannon and the central component of the Franco-British 40CTAS (40 mm Cased Telescoped Armament System) developed by CTA International. It is designed to fire 40mm telescoped ammunition. This format provides significant benefit within vehicles in the space envelope required for the gun and the ammunition storage. However, the selection of the unfielded, thus unproven, new design for major French and British programmes was controversial.

The 40CTAS has been ordered by the French Army for use on its future EBRC Jaguar armoured reconnaissance vehicle. The latter entered service in February 2022. It has also been mandated for the UK Ajax (formerly FRES SV) and (cancelled) Warrior Capability Sustainment Programme (WCSP) programmes.

In February 2010, CTA International signed a £11m contract with the French and British defence ministries to qualify the 40CT; this included environmental testing and the firing of 15,000 rounds. The company has confirmed that the ammunition for the British weapons will be assembled by BAE Systems at the ROF Glascoed facility.

== Design ==
The 40CTAS cannon consists of multiple modules:

- 40 CT, the autocannon, the element that is common between the French and the British systems.
- AHS, an ammunition handling system. It is a system that feeds the munition in the cannon. For the 40CTAS, the ammunition is linkless, and the feeding system is of a carousel type, and those are adapted to the turret it is included in. The French and the British have developed two different systems:
  - Nexter (now KNDS France) has developed its own solution, and it is used on all French systems.
  - The British Army wanted the ammunition to be separated from the crew for safety reasons. Lockeed Martin UK, in charge of the development of the turret for the General Dynamics Ajax, subcontracted the development and the production of the AHS to Meggitt. Initially it was also planned to equip the Warrior CSP, but it ended up being cancelled.
- Gun Mount, the mechanical interface between the gun and the turret; it is adaptable to integration needs. The French and British solutions are not the same.
- GCE, the gun control equipment, a pointing and stabilisation system which enables to fire on the move and remain performant. Each turret has its unique stabilisation system and algorithm.
  - The Jaguar EBRC is equipped with its own stabilisation system, but it has had development issues, being incapable to safely shoot in movement in its early life. As of 2024, modifications to the software solved most of the problems. The Jaguar has been capable to shoot in movement since the standard R2.
  - For the General Dynamics Ajax, Curtiss-Wright (based in Zurich) supplies the TDSS (turret drive servo system) to Lockheed Martin.
- CTAS-C, the controller for the cannon. It is the command and control box for the weapon power supply system. Multiple technical solutions are possible, among which the integration of the fire control when enables a "coincidence firing" function which maximises the performance.

== Ammunition ==
The table below lists the 40CTAS's proprietary 40 mm telescoped ammunition. The various models are produced for various applications.

CTA International granted production licences to:

- KNDS Ammo France
- BAE Systems UK

Model	Type	Roles	Image	Ammunition mass	Projectile mass	Submunition mass	Muzzle velocity	Penetration	Effective range	Notes
Mission ammunition
APFSDS-T	Kinetic energy - penetrator (APFSDS type) / tungsten fin	Vehicle armour penetration		1,900 grams (67 oz)	550 grams (19 oz)	–	> 1,500 m/s (4,900 ft/s)	140 mm (5.5 in) RHA at 1,500 m (4,900 ft)	> 2,500 m (2,700 yd)	
GPR-PD-T; General purpose - point detonation - tracer	Multi-role / impact delay fuze ammunition	Anti-structure / anti-light AFV / anti-infantry		2,400 grams (85 oz)	980 grams (35 oz)	–	1,000 m/s (3,300 ft/s)	210 mm (8.3 in) concrete at 1,000 m (3,300 ft)	2,500 m (2,700 yd)	
GPR-PD-T; General purpose - point detonation - tracer	Multi-role / impact delay fuze ammunition	Anti-structure / anti-light AFV / anti-infantry		2,400 grams (85 oz)	980 grams (35 oz)	–	1,000 m/s (3,300 ft/s)	15 mm (0.59 in) RHA at 1,000 m (3,300 ft)	2,500 m (2,700 yd)	
GPR-KE-T; General purpose - kinetic energy - tracer	Inert variant of the GPR-PD-T	Low-value targets engagement (improvised structure)	–	2,400 grams (85 oz)	980 grams (35 oz)	–	1,000 m/s (3,300 ft/s)	–	2,500 m (2,700 yd)	
GPR-AB-T; General purpose - airburst - tracer	Muti-role / airburst above targets fragments	Anti-infantry / anti-AFV antennas and electronics		2,400 grams (85 oz)	980 grams (35 oz)	–	1,000 m/s (3,300 ft/s)	210 mm (8.3 in) concrete at 1,000 m (3,300 ft)	2,500 m (2,700 yd)	Fragments can spread over 125 m^{2} (1,350 ft^{2}).
GPR-AB-T; General purpose - airburst - tracer	Muti-role / airburst above targets fragments	Anti-infantry / anti-AFV antennas and electronics		2,400 grams (85 oz)	980 grams (35 oz)	–	1,000 m/s (3,300 ft/s)	15 mm (0.59 in) RHA at 1,000 m (3,300 ft)	2,500 m (2,700 yd)	Fragments can spread over 125 m^{2} (1,350 ft^{2}).
KE-AB P33; Kinetic energy - airburst	Kinetic energy - airburst / tungsten pellets	Anti-air munition / anti-infantry / anti-AFV antennas and electronics		3,000 grams (110 oz)	1,400 grams (49 oz) (projectile) :	330 grams (12 oz) (pellets)	900 m/s (3,000 ft/s)	–	3,000 m (3,300 yd)	
KE-AB P66; Kinetic energy - airburst	Kinetic energy - airburst / tungsten pellets	Anti-air munition / anti-infantry / anti-AFV antennas and electronics		3,000 grams (110 oz)	1,400 grams (49 oz) (projectile) :	660 grams (23 oz) (pellets)	900 m/s (3,000 ft/s)	–	4,000 m (4,400 yd)	
Training ammunition
TP-T; Target practice - tracer	Standard training round	–		2,400 grams (85 oz)	980 grams (35 oz)	–	1,000 m/s (3,300 ft/s)	–	–	
TPRR-T; Target practice reduced range - tracer	Reduced range training round	–		1,900 grams (67 oz)	730 grams (26 oz)	–	1,000 m/s (3,300 ft/s)	–	–	

== Weapon systems equipped with the 40 CT cannon ==
=== Current systems ===
==== T40 turret - Jaguar EBRC ====
The turret used by the Jaguar EBRC is the KNDS France T40.

The turret has 65 shells ready-to-fire, and a total of 180 munitions. The turret enables to shoot at angles comprised between -10° to +45°. It has a rate of fire of 200 rounds per minute. The turret is fully stabilised and able to shoot in movement.

The turret is also equipped with a remote weapon station Arquus T3 Hornet S with a FN MAG machine gun. Two ATGM Akeron MP are ready to fire in a pod, and two additional missiles are stored in the vehicles. And it is equipped with a Safran PASEO commander sight, Safran sights, and Thales communication systems.

==== Naval RapidFire ====
The Naval RapidFire was developed by KNDS France in collaboration with Thales.

It is a naval turret based on the 40CTC, intended to be used as a close-in defence weapon system for surface vessels. It is designed to treat both surface and air targets efficiently with its A3B rounds. The A3B rounds releases 660 grams (23 oz) of tungsten pellets that form a cloud of sub-projectiles in front of a target. The suggested method for aerial engagements is to fire at 80 rounds per minute, shooting a 4-round burst at 4,000 m (13,000 ft), then waiting a few seconds for damage assessment before firing another burst. The RapidFire was selected for integration on the 4 Bâtiment ravitailleur de forces (BRF) of the French Navy as well as the upcoming class of 10 Patrouilleurs Hauturiers (PH) offshore patrol vessels. The first system was installed on the lead ship the BRF, Jacques Chevallier, in February 2023.

=== Systems in development ===
==== Nexter/Thales Land RapidFire ====
The Land RapidFire was developed by KNDS France in collaboration with Thales.

It is the land-based variant of the RapidFire and is meant for integration on military vehicles. The turret can store between 70 and 140 rounds, with additional rounds stored in the turret structure's compartment. The rate of fire reaches 200 rpm, and can reach targets at a distance of 2,500 metres (1.6 mi) for surface targets, and 4,000 metres (2.5 mi) for aerial targets. Mock-ups presented by KNDS France show the RapidFire system mounted on 6×6 and 8×8 trucks. The variant presented on the 8×8 truck has the capacity to be dismounted and operated independently.

==== KNDS France RCT40 ====
It is a turret developed for the VBCI Mk2, a modern IFV. Amongst its advantages, its cannon can reach up to 60° of vertical elevation, which enables it to fight more effectively against loitering munitions.

==== Lockheed Martin UK ====
GDLS UK and Lockheed Martin UK unveiled an IFV variant of the Ajax chassis at DSEI 2025. It is equipped with an unmanned turret equipped with the CT40 autocannon.

== Users ==
=== Current operators ===
France (300 + 8)
The French Army plans to order a total of 300 EBRC Jaguar, 150 have been ordered at the moment:
- 20 Jaguar ordered in 2017
- 42 Jaguar ordered in 2020
- 88 Jaguar ordered in 2022
The French Navy is using the cannon on one ship family, and is planning to order other ones:
- 4 Bâtiment ravitailleur de forces ordered in 2019, each ship is equipped with 2 RAPIDFire.
United Kingdom (245)
The British Army ordered 245 Ajax equipped with the 40CTC.

=== Future operators ===
Belgium (60)
The Belgian Land Component ordered 60 EBRC Jaguar in 2018 as part of the CaMo cooperation with the French Army. It will succeed to the Piranha III DF30 & DF90.
France (14 + 3 options)
French Navy:
- 7 OPV Patrouilleurs Hauturiers and plans to order 3 additional ones, each to be equipped with one RAPIDFire.
French Air and Space Force:
- 7 RapidFire Land ordered to protect air fields.
Luxembourg (38)
The intent to procure the SCORPION vehicles, including 38 EBRC Jaguar, was announced in May 2024.
The Luxembourg parliament approved the purchase in November 2024. The contract was signed in December 2025.
Planned for delivery from 2028.

=== Potential operators ===
France
Several French Army programmes might lead to the introduction of the 40CTC cannon within the forces beyond the EBRC Jaguar:
- France is in discussion with Greece regarding the sale of 120 second-hand VBCI IFV as a quick solution for Greece. It is highly likely that France would replace those vehicles with the VBCI-2 and the T40 turret equipped with the 40CTC cannon.
- A report from French elected official demonstrated a need for a cost-effective SHORAD capability in the French Army. The answer given is the Land RapidFire.
Greece (200)
KNDS and Hellenic Defence Systems partnered in 2022 to offer the VBCI Philoctetes to the Hellenic Army. In 2024, more details regarding the potential sale of VBCI were revealed:
- 200 VBCI-2 that would be equipped with the T40 turret (40CTC and the Akeron MP ATGM)
- 50 VBCI-2 in support configurations (sanitary, artillery observation, command)
- 120 VBCI, second-hand from the French Army for rapid implementation
Ireland
The Irish Army is negotiating for EBRC vehicles.
Kuwait
KNDS and the UK is offering the ARTEC Boxer to the Kuwait Army and the 40CTC with the T40 turret is being offered as a potential weapon.
Qatar
KNDS and the UK is offering the ARTEC Boxer to the Qatar Army equipped with the T40 (turret with 40CTC cannon).
KNDS France also proposed the VBCI-2 equipped with the T40 turret to Qatar. In April 2024, discussions for a first batch of 120 VBCI-2 were ongoing.

=== Cancelled orders ===
United Kingdom
The British Army cancelled the modernisation of the Warrior in 2021. A surplus worth £70 million of 40CTC cannons was revealed by the UK MoD following this cancellation. A total of 515 cannon had been ordered by the MoD in 2015. The consequence is that some of those cannons were available for sale, or for other programme. It is unknown whether these were used to supply Belgian and Luxembourg EBRC, or if the MoD kept them for future potential programmes.

=== Lost bids ===
Australia
The Australian Army opened a tender process in the Land 400 Phase 2 programme. Nexter offered the VBCI-2 equipped with the T40 turret and 40CTC cannon. The Australian Army shortlisted two of its competitors, the Boxer equipped with the LANCE 30 turret and the Patria AMV equipped with the BAE E35 turret. The Boxer won the programme, 133 in the CRV variant equipped with a LANCE 30 turret using the MK 30-2 cannon.
Bulgaria
Nexter pitched the VBCI-2 with the T40 turret and the Nexter Titus as future vehicles for the Bulgarian Army in 2019. The Stryker won the competition and a contract was signed in 2024. The IFV variant is the M1296 Dragoon which is equipped with the ATK Orbital MK.44S Bushmaster II cannon.
Lithuania
In 2015, Nexter offered the VBCI-2 with the T40 turret or the Leonardo Hitfist to the Lithuanian Army. The Boxer won the competition in 2016 with the sale of 91 "Vilkas" equped with the Samson Mk II RCT turret using the ATK Orbital MK.44S Bushmaster II cannon.
Spain
In 2015, Nexter offered the VBCI-2 with the T40 turret for the new infantry fighting vehicle of the Spanish Army. The Piranha V won the tender process and it is equipped with the Guardian 30 turret with the ATK Orbital MK.44S Bushmaster II cannon.
