= KNDS France =

French government-owned weapons manufacturer, half-privatized in 2015

- Formerly: GIAT Industries (1973 - 2006); Nexter (2006-2024)
- Type: Société Anonyme
- Industry: Defence
- Predecessor: Nexter, GIAT Industries
- Founded: 1973; 53 years ago
- Founder: French government
- Headquarters: Versailles n. Paris, France
- Products: artillery, ammunition, military vehicles, tanks, electronics, robots, CBRN, optronics
- Revenue: ▲€962 million (2018)
- Net income: €118 million (2018)
- Number of employees: 3,700
- Parent: since 2015 KNDS
- Website: knds.fr/en

KNDS France (formerly known as Nexter, GIAT Industries or Groupement des Industries de l'Armée de Terre, Army Industries Group) is a French government-owned weapons manufacturer, based in Versailles. The company was wholly government-owned as GIAT from 1991 to 2006 and as Nexter from 2006 to 2015, when it merged with Krauss-Maffei Wegmann (KMW) to form KNDS: a single company jointly owned, via holding companies, by the French state and the private owners of KMW. In 2024, Nexter was renamed KNDS France.

== Group organization ==
KNDS France and its subsidiaries are divided into several smaller entities, with the main one being KNDS France. The sub-companies are:

- KNDS Ammo France
- KNDS Ammo Italy S.P.A
- KNDS Belgium
- KNDS France Mechanics
- KNDS France Robotics
- KNDS France Training
- KNDS OptSys
- KNDS CBRN

== History ==
The GIAT group was founded in 1973 by combining the industrial assets of the technical direction of Army weapons of the French Ministry of Defense. The company was nationalized in 1991. On 22 September 2006 GIAT became the core of the new company Nexter.

For many years GIAT struggled to turn a profit. The company was operated at a loss. A 2001 report by the Cour des Comptes and a 2002 report by the National Assembly described the situation as critical. In April 2004 the board of directors presented the public with a financial statement showing a profit of several hundred million Euros. This was mainly due to increased export sales, and the modernization of the Leclerc Main Battle Tank (MBT) and several other armored platforms. Sales to the UAE however were accomplished with the payment of $200 million to intermediaries.

In 2006, the THL-20 gun turret was selected by Hindustan Aeronautics Limited for use on the HAL Light Combat Helicopter, incorporating the 20 mm M621 cannon.

=== Rebranding as Nexter (2006) ===
On 21 September 2006, then-CEO Luc Vigneron announced that GIAT would soon complete a corporate restructuring that had been planned since 2003. The company's legacy product lines would be grouped under a holding company that would retain the GIAT name, while those slated for future development and expansion would be separated into four subsidiaries, all branded with the name "Nexter". The reorganization took effect on 1 December.

Nexter has a joint venture CTA International with BAE Systems to develop and manufacture case telescoped weapon systems and ammunition of 40 mm calibre.

Nexter continues to produce several former GIAT small arms, cannon, and anti-armour weapons. One such weapon is the Wasp 58, a low cost, one man antiarmour/assault weapon system.

In May 2014 Nexter bought two artillery shell manufacturers: Mecar in Petit-Roeulx-les-Nivelles Belgium, and Simmel Difesa in Colleferro Italy.

=== Merger with KMW (2015) ===
In 2015, Nexter and Krauss-Maffei merged under a single structure. The new KMW+Nexter Defense Systems (KNDS) will be the European leader of terrestrial defense with more than 6,000 employees. The supervisory board appointed the new CEO of Nexter Systems, Stéphane Mayer, and the chairman of the executive board of KMW, Frank Haun, as CEOs of the holding company.

On 24 October 2023, Nexter's Mecar subsidiary announced that it had found an investment of €15 million for a 155mm artillery shell production facility. A guarantee by the Belgian Defense Ministry of €10 million was needed to initiate construction. In May 2024 the price of the munitions was between €7,000 and €10,000. The facility would be able to produce roughly 100 shells per day, which was then roughly a third of the number of heavy artillery shells produced at KNDS overall. At the time, Mecar did not have permission to handle explosives, so the shells needed to be sent away for final assembly. In May 2024 the Belgian defense minister Ludivine Dedonder signed a contract with Nexter to buy 4,000 shells annually for the next 20 years.

In February 2024 Nexter signed an agreement with a Saudi group called Wahaj that they would together develop a guided shell for use with the 156 CAESAR artillery delivery systems that were on order by the Saudi government, which had established more stringent precision standards than normal. The state-of-the-art ordnance systems used GPS and IMU; the newly-specified "Sabir" system would add a (drone-mounted) laser pointer feature and have a range of 60km. In addition, the Saudis prize the ITAR-free status of their new shells.

=== Rebranding as KNDS France (2024) ===
As a result of the merger of Nexter Systems into KNDS, the KNDS brand replaced the Nexter brand in June 2023. In April 2024, the Nexter Systems subsidiary was officially renamed KNDS France, while Krauss-Maffei Wegmann became KNDS Deutschland.

== Products ==
Nexter designs and manufactures military protected vehicles for the French military and other international militaries:

- The Véhicule de l'Avant Blindé (VAB) armoured personnel carrier;
- The Nexter Aravis - Mine Resistant Ambush Protected Vehicle;
- The Nexter Titus wheeled and mine protected vehicle;
- The VBMR Griffon armoured personnel carrier VBMR-L Serval and EBRC Jaguar

The company also acquired a large influence in the field of combat and artillery vehicles thanks to the development of several large caliber cannons:

- The Leclerc main battle tank;
- The CAESAR - 155 mm wheeled self-propelled howitzer;
- The VBCI (Véhicule blindé de combat d'infanterie) wheeled armoured infantry fighting vehicle;
- The LG1 Mark II 105 mm towed howitzer;
- The TRF1 155 mm towed howitzer
- The GCT 155mm self-propelled gun
- The AMX-10 RC tank destroyer

And several types of munitions for medium and large-calibre weapons:

- 120 mm ammunition
- 155 mm ammunition
- Tank ammunition
- 40 mm ammunitions

Nexter/GIAT also manufactures various weapons:

- The FAMAS assault rifle;
- The M621 cannon
- The FR F2 sniper rifle;
- The 20 mm modèle F2 gun;
- The M811 25 mm cannon;
- The APILAS anti-tank rocket launcher;
- The Wasp 58 Light Anti-Armour Weapon;
- The Armes de Défense Rapprochée personal defence weapon;
- The GIAT 30 aircraft-mounted revolver cannon;
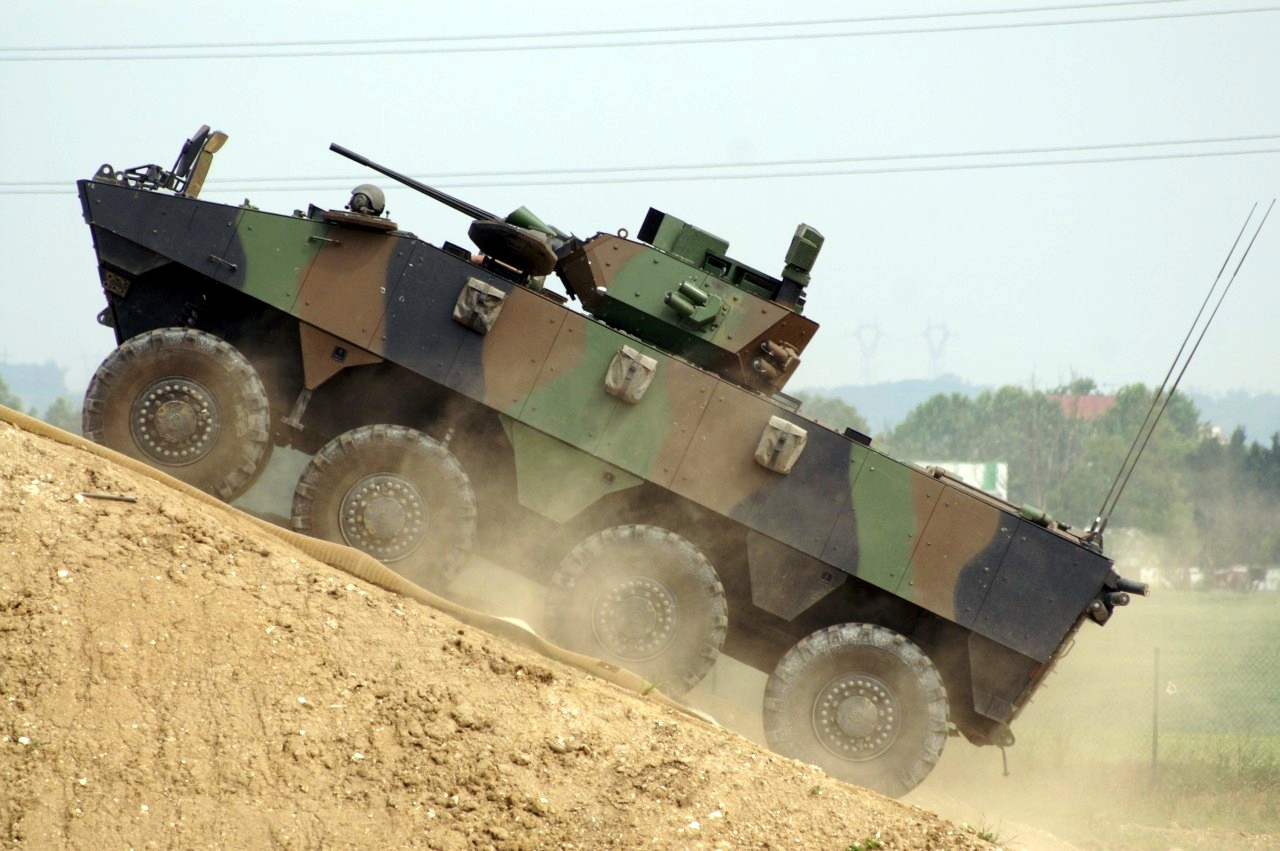
VBCI

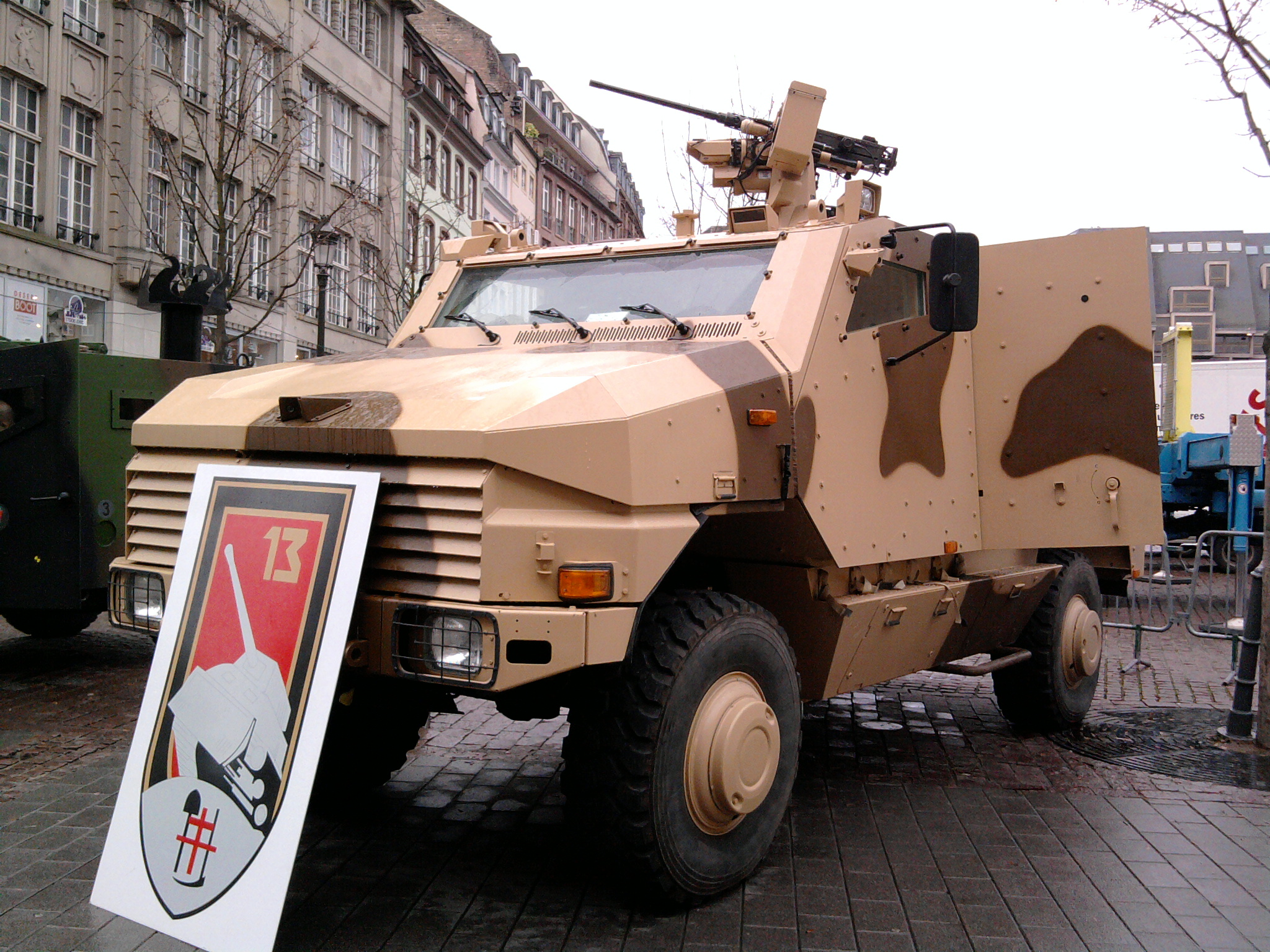
Aravis

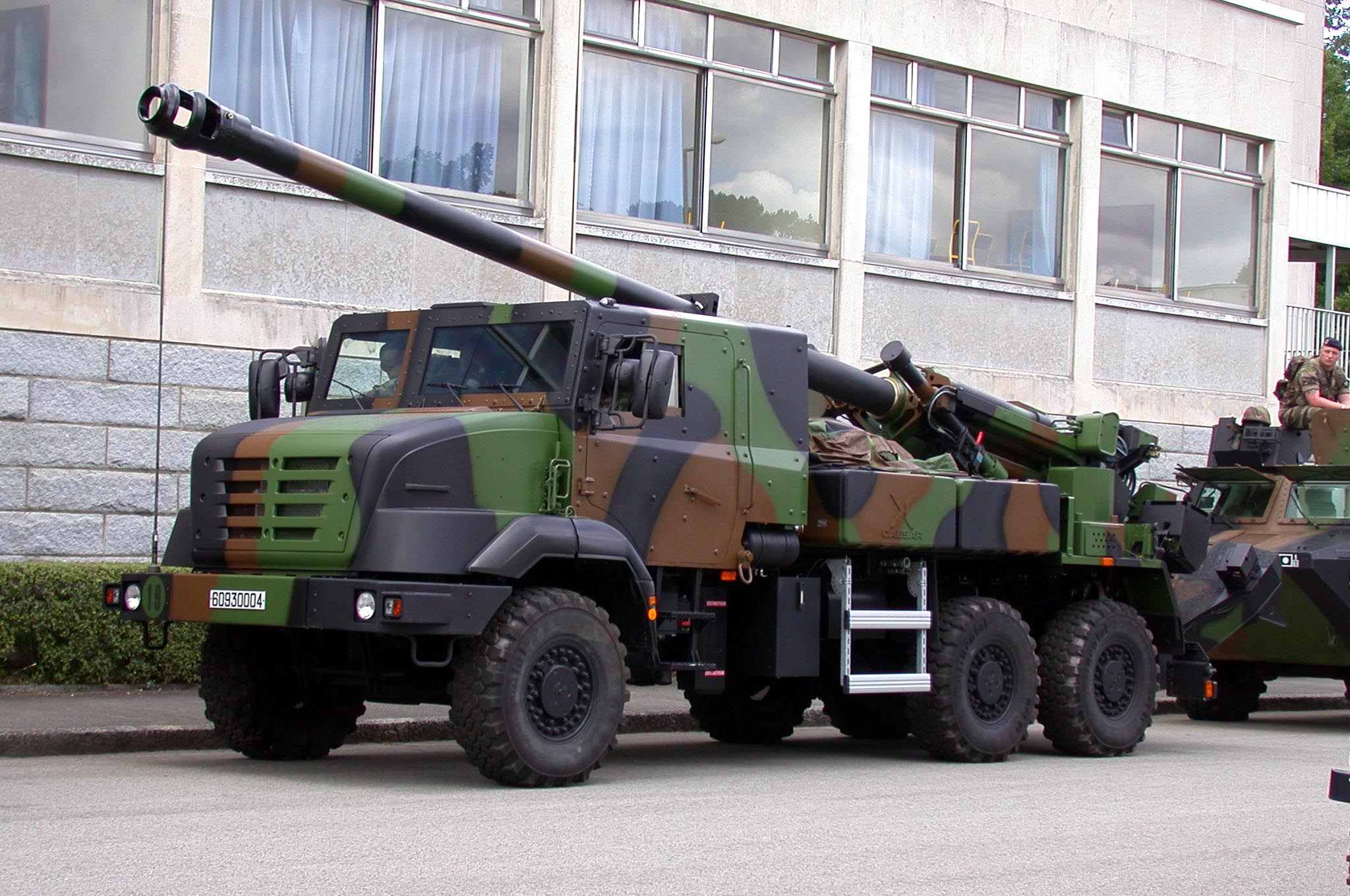
CAESAR

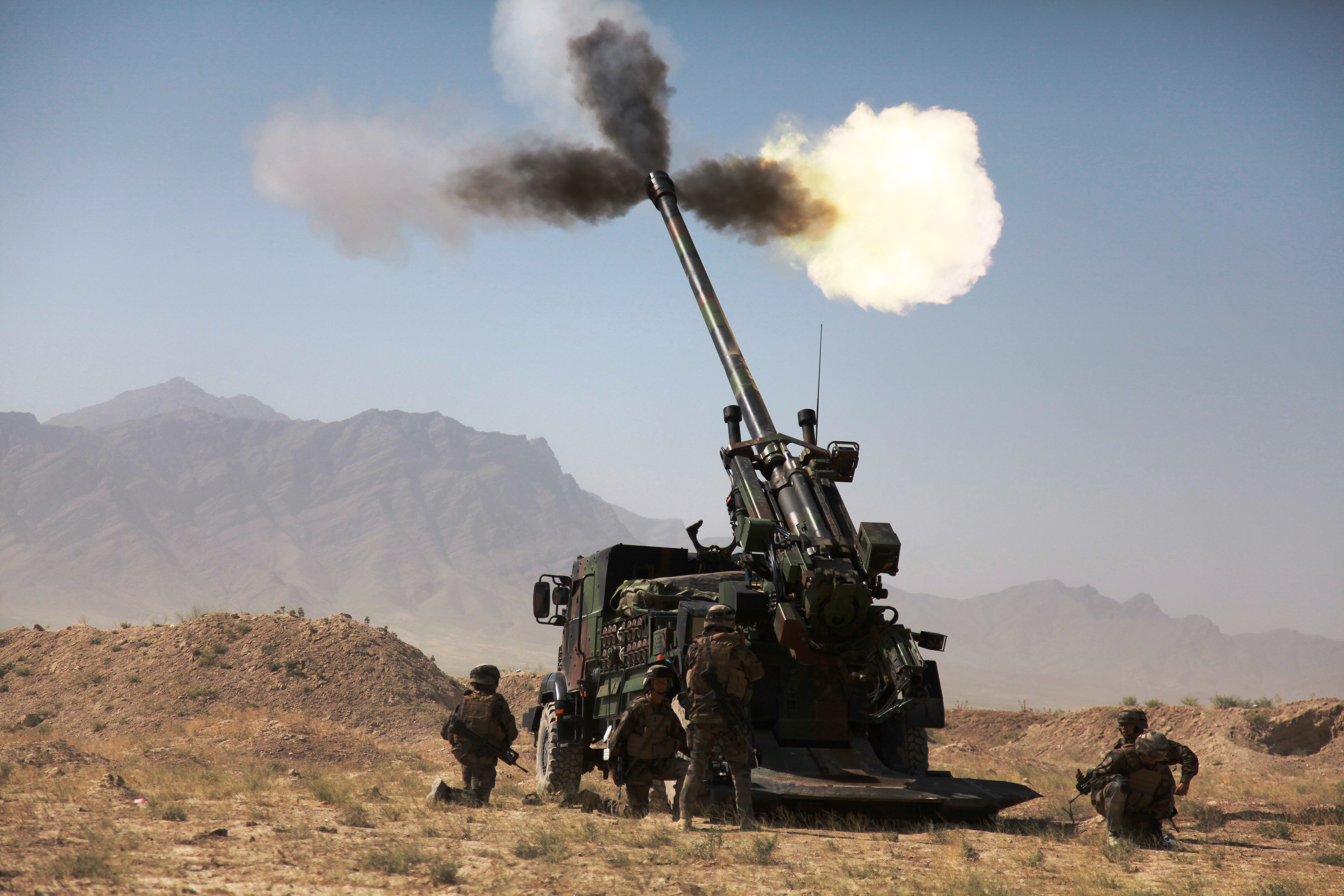
CAESAR

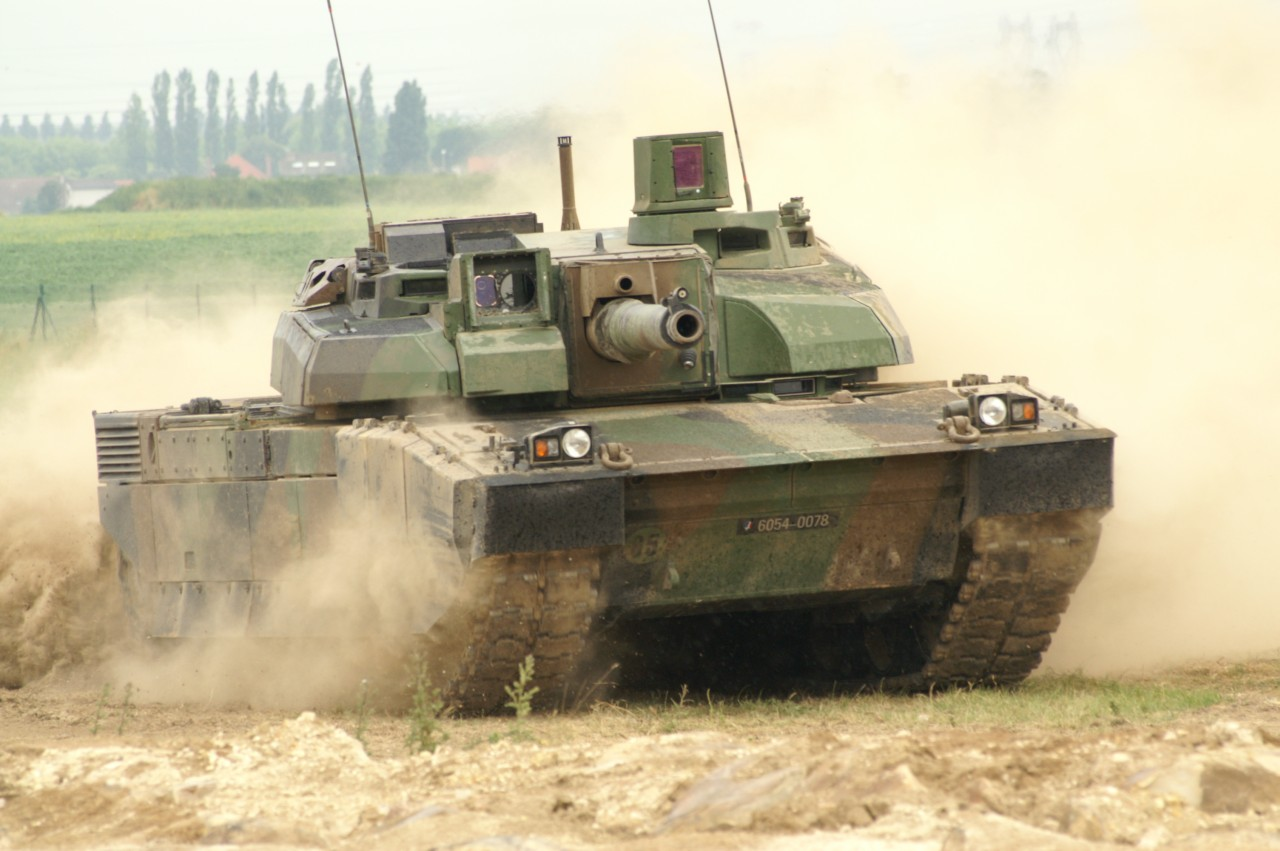
Leclerc

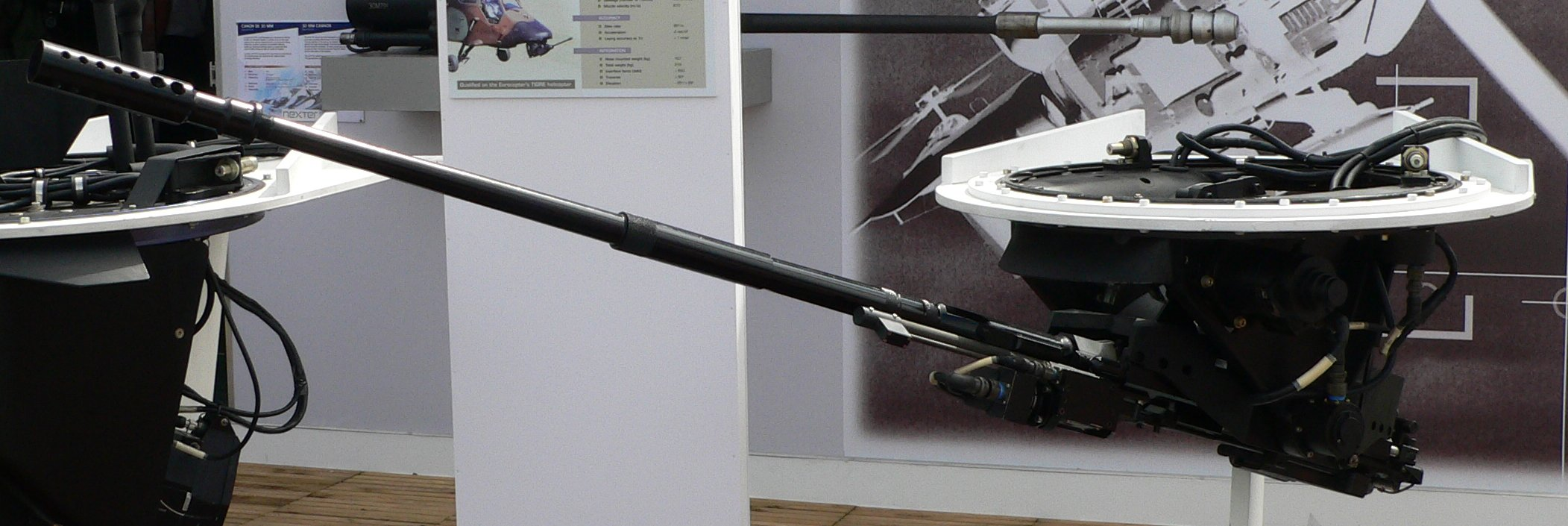
THL-20 helicopter gun turret

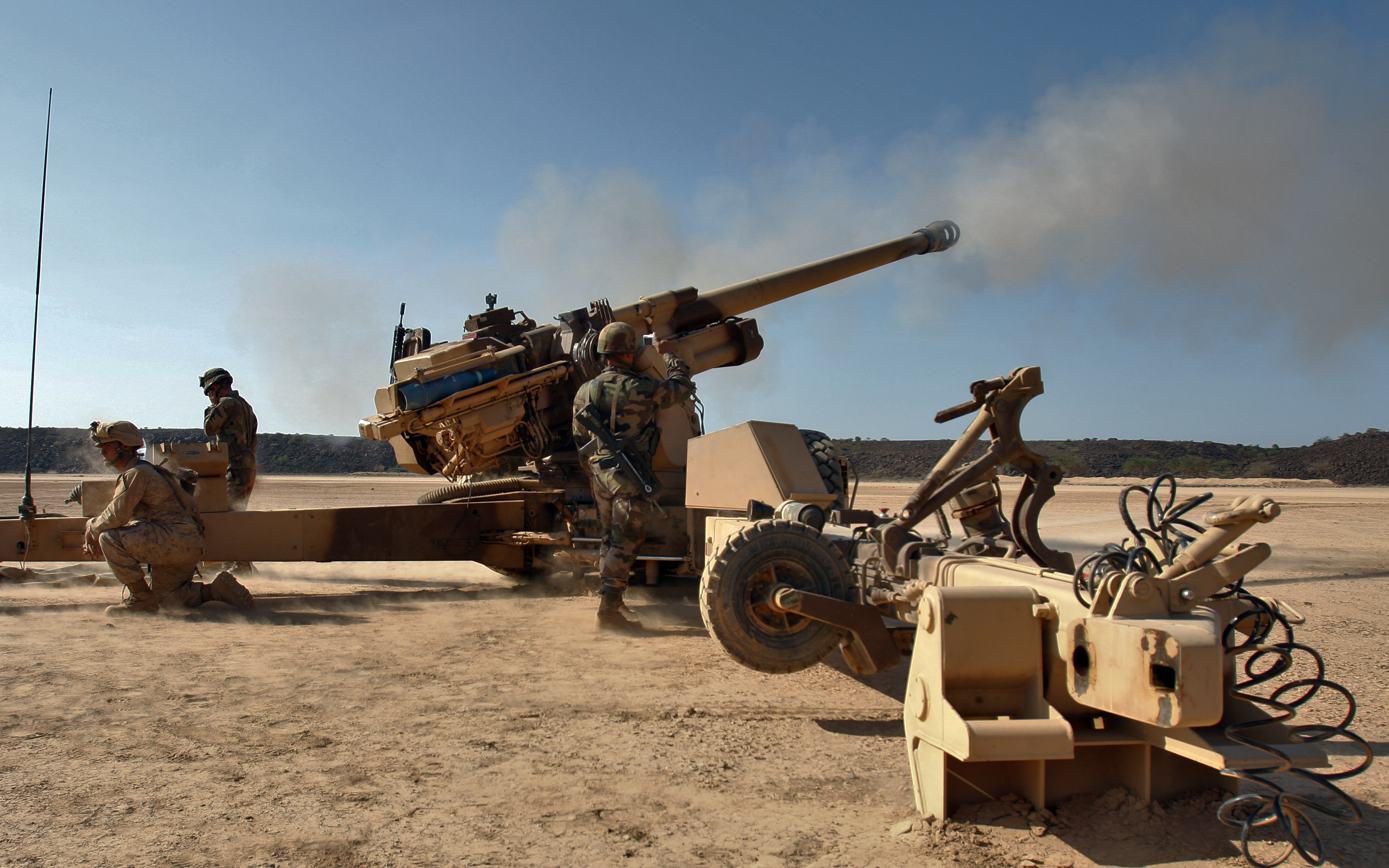
TRF1 155 mm towed howitzer
