= Telescoped ammunition =

Type of Ammunition

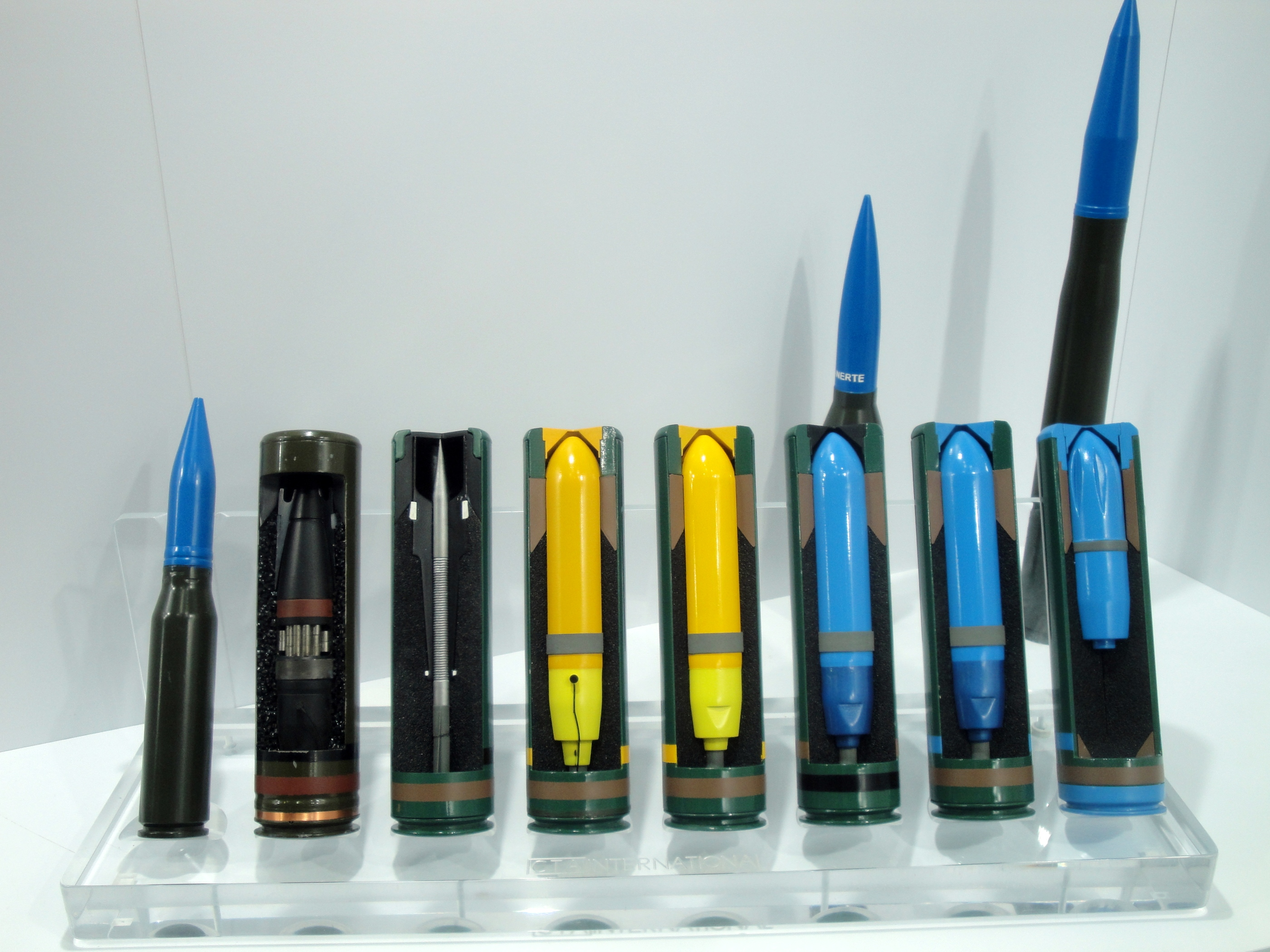
Telescoped ammunition for the 40 mm Cased Telescoped Armament System (CTAS) by CTA International

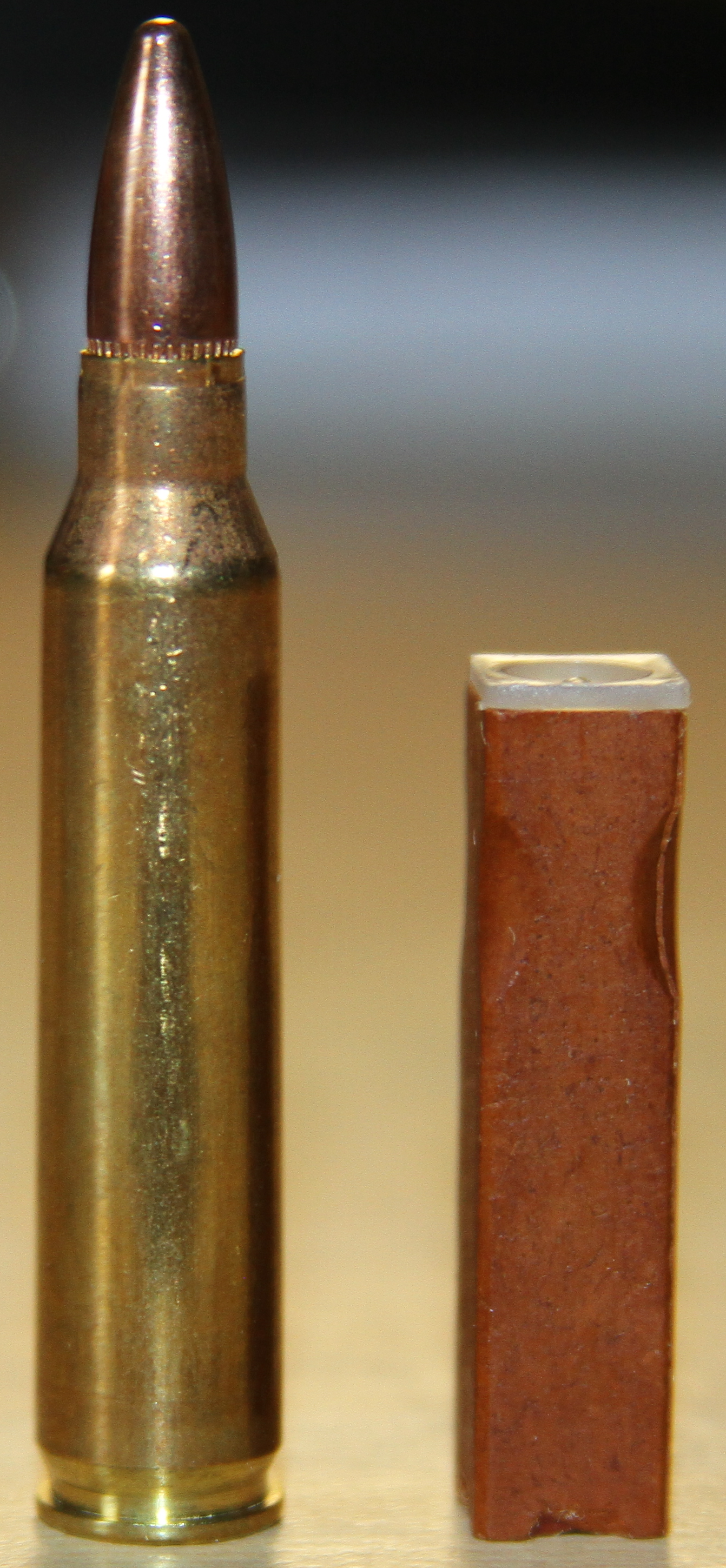
(right) 4.73×33mm telescoped and caseless ammunition for the Heckler & Koch G11, with .223 Remington cased ammunition for comparison

Telescoped ammunition is an ammunition design in which the projectile is partially or completely enveloped by the propellant. Examples include ammunition for both hand weapons and artillery. Caseless ammunition is often telescoped.

Telescoped ammunition has advantages in comparison with traditional ammunition cartridges. It can have a shorter overall length than a traditional round of comparable mass, while having similar ballistics. In addition, telescoped rounds may avoid the risk of damage to the projectile during the loading process, and may simplify and increase the reliability of magazines and other feed mechanisms.

The Rikhter R-23 autocannon was chambered in the 23x260 mm telescoped round. It took some time to develop as it remained a military secret for a long time, and was not used operationally until 1964. It was used only in the tail turret of the Tu-22, and experimentally on the Salyut 3 space station. A modified version of the weapon was the only cannon to have been fired in space.

Cased telescoped ammunition for the LSAT light machine gun has reached technology readiness level 7. In August 2013, AAI Corporation was awarded a $US2.05 million contract to continue developing parts of the US LSAT program. Part of the contract is to further refine 5.56 mm cased telescoped ammunition, and develop 7.62 mm cased telescoped cartridges.

Beginning in late 2020, a polymer telescopic case based rifle designed by Textron, a US based defense contractor, was under consideration in the Next Generation Squad Weapon trials run by the United States Army.

The Anglo-French 40CT cannon which uses 40 mm telescoped ammunition, is in service with the British Army's General Dynamics Ajax armoured fighting vehicle.
