= Mowag Piranha V =

Piranha V
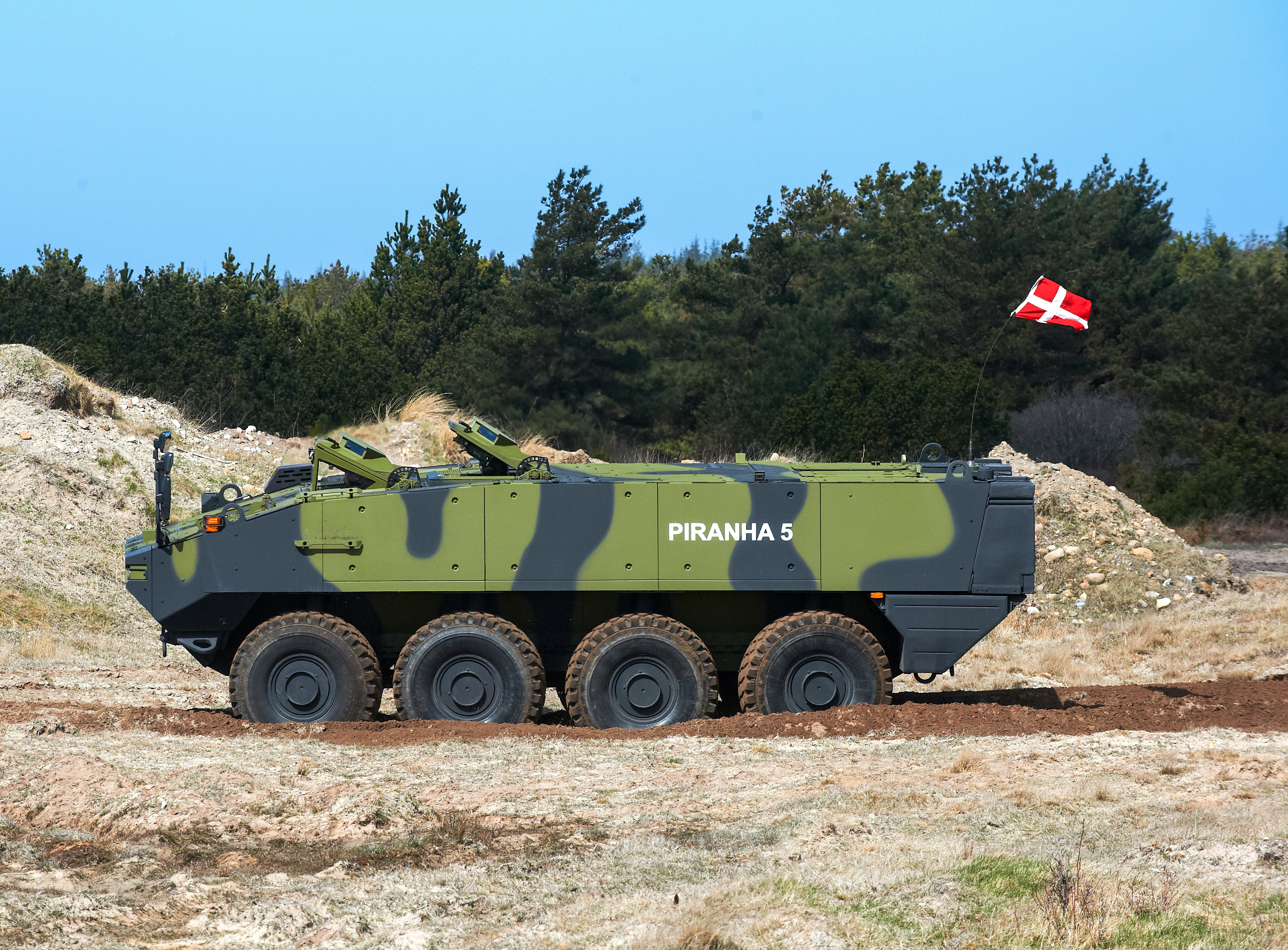
- Danish Mowag Piranha 5
- Type: Wheeled armoured fighting vehicle
- Place of origin: Switzerland

Service history
- In service: 2015 – present
- Used by: See Operators

Production history
- Designer: General Dynamics European Land Systems
- Designed: 2004 - 2008 (for the FRES programme)
- Manufacturer: GDELS Mowag GmbH; GDELS Deutschland GmbH; Bucharest Mechanical Factory
- Developed from: Mowag Piranha IV
- Developed into: Luchs 2; VCR Dragón
- Variants: By GDELS Mowag: Piranha 6×6: RECCE; Piranha 8×8: Mortar Carrier; IFV; APC; Stratcom; Sappeur; Ambulance; C2; CIS/GEO; SHORAD; Piranha 10×10: AAC; HMC; Recovery; Bridge Layer

Specifications
- Mass: 30 t (66,000 lb)
- Length: 8 m (26 ft)
- Width: 2.99 m (9.8 ft)
- Height: 2.34 m (7.7 ft)
- Crew: 2 on non turret variants 3 on IFV/RWS variants + Maximum 8 passengers
- Armor: 14.5 mm AP resistant. Maximum Add-on (25 mm AP resistant)
- Main armament: APC: RCWS 12.7 mm machine gun with option for anti-tank missile launcher; IFV: 30 mm autocannon turret; Mortar carrier: 120 mm mortar
- Secondary armament: IFV: 7.62 mm coaxial machine gun (on turret)
- Engine: MTU 6V199 TE21 or Scania DC13; 437 kW (586 hp), or 480 kW (640 hp)
- Power/weight: 14.56 kW/t (19.53 hp/t), or 16 kW/t (21 hp/t)
- Drive: 6×6, 8×8 and 10×10
- Transmission: ZF 7HP902S or SAPA SW624
- Suspension: Hydropneumatic 6×6, 8×8 and 10×10 wheeled
- Fuel capacity: 450 L (120 US gal)
- Operational range: 550 km (340 mi)
- Maximum speed: 100 km/h (62 mph)

The Piranha V multi-role armoured fighting vehicle is the fifth generation variant of the Mowag Piranha family of vehicles. It was designed by General Dynamics European Land Systems - Mowag GmbH. The first prototype was completed in 2008. It was first introduced during the Eurosatory exhibition in 2010.

== Development ==
The Piranha V was developed by General Dynamics UK and General Dynamics European Land Systems - Mowag GmbH. It was designed to meet the British Army requirements of the Future Rapid Effect System (FRES) program. In 2007, it was announced that three vehicles were participating in the program: the Boxer, the VBCI, and the Piranha V.

In 2008, the Piranha V was announced as the provisional selection in the FRES program. However, no production order was announced, and the contract was subsequently cancelled in December 2008. By the end of 2008, the first prototype was finished. The vehicle was presented by GDELS at the Eurosatory exhibition in 2010, together with a new variant of the ASCOD IFV. In 2016, it was successfully loaded into an Airbus A400M cargo aircraft during an evaluation exercise in Seville.

A live firing test was conducted at Camp Rena in Norway, in 2019, with the presence of the Romanian procurement authority. The Piranha V, fitted with the Israeli UT30 MK 2 passed the series of static and dynamic shooting tests in harsh environmental conditions, exceeding the customer's requirements, as noted by GDELS.

In 2024 GD General Dynamics European Land Systems unveiled the 10×10 Piranha V HMC that can be equipped in either a bridging, troop transport or howitzer configuration.

== Design ==
=== Mobility ===
The Piranha V is available with a MTU 6V199 TE21 diesel engine producing 586 horsepower (437 kW). Both Denmark and Spain, however, have opted for a different powerpack built by the Spanish company SAPA, consisting of a Scania Diesel engine with 480 kW coupled with the SW 624 automatic transmission, and an auxiliary power unit with 75 kW.

=== Protection ===
Standard armour (STANAG 4569, Level 4/4b) offers all-round 14.5mm AP protection and 20mm-23mm AP on front. Can offer full protection for the crew if a 10 kg explosive AT mine explodes under the hull. Add-ons can offer all-round protection to 25mm AP rounds and level 5 STANAG 4569.

=== Modularity ===
The Piranha V is developed as a modular payload with the 6×6, 8×8 and 10×10 featuring a 7.5, 14.5 and 18 ton payload capacity

== Operational history ==
=== Denmark ===
At the end of 2015, Denmark announced the order of 308 vehicles. The first Piranhas were to arrive in 2018, with the last arriving in 2023. The Piranha V was selected as the replacement of the old M113. It was selected over the CV90 Armadillo, the ASCOD, and the VBCI.

The Danish Piranha V contract includes six different variants: infantry, command, pioneer, ambulance, repair and mortar. The first pre-production variant vehicles arrived in 2017, with the first production variants being officially handed over to the Armed Forces in March 2019.

According to the mortar carrier deal signed between the Danish Defence Acquisition and Logistics Organization (DALO) signed and the Elbit Systems subsidiary ELSAIT, 15 Piranha Vs were equipped with the A3MS 120mm mortar system.

The ambulance version of the Piranha was received in 2020. The vehicles were assigned to the 1st Brigade where they replaced the Piranha III and Mowag Duro 6×6. The same year, the Danish Finansudvalg cleared the Danish MoD to use 128 million DKK(20 million USD) on having GDELS and MILDEF AB convert 110 Piranha V APCs into Communication and Information Systems (CIS) and Geospatial (GEO) command platform

In 2023, the Danish Ministry of Defence announced that it selected the Skyranger 30 as part of its planned ground air defense system. The Skyranger system is to be mounted on the Piranha V platform. The integration will be performed by the Danish company Terma A/S.

==== Danish deplyments of Piranha V ====
All Piranha V have been and continue to be deployed by the Danish military as part of the contingents to Estonia and Latvia as part of NATO EFP.

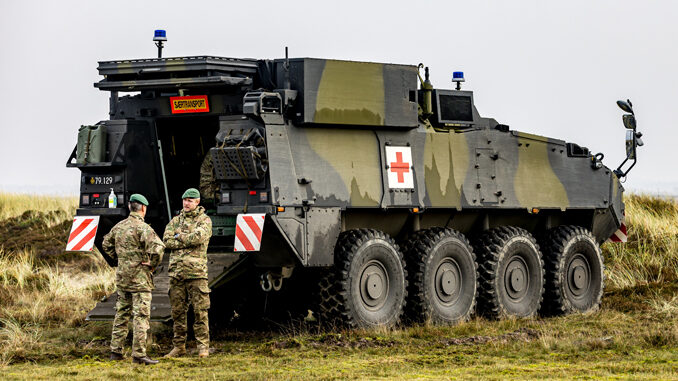
Piranha V Ambulance in Danish service

The Piranha V has also seen service as part of civilian readiness where theyve served as ambulances during harsh winters where normal ambulances would not be able to navigate.

==== Danish criticism of the weapon system ====
The Piranha V has received harsh criticism by its users within the Danish armed forces due to issues including possible radio interference discharging the machine gun, problems with the vehicle brakes and a lack of both spare parts and mechanics who can repair the faults that occur on an ongoing basis. In 2024, it was reported that the Piranha V armored personnel carriers are planned to be retired from infantry use in favor of other infantry fighting vehicles, with the Piranhas relegated to command and control, engineering, artillery and expeditionary deployment use.

=== Germany ===
==== Piranha V 8×8 StratCom ====
As part of the programme "TaWAN LBO (Taktische Wide Area Network Landbasierte Operationen) Richtfunkmanagement, klein", the German Army selected the Piranha V StratCom (Strategic Communication Systems), an armoured vehicle that was presented by GDELS at Eurosatory 2024. It is equipped with a 15-meter communication mast system with point-to-point radio systems, and a C4I command system.

The "Richtfunkpanzer" was selected by the Germany in January 2025, and ordered in February 2025.

==== Piranha V 6×6 - KnifeFish ====
The German Army plans to replace the Hummel vehicle, a jammer based on the TPz Fuchs with a Piranha 6×6 called the "Maus Störpanzer" (Mobiles Aufklärungsunterstützungssystem).

The purchase of 90 vehicles was blocked by the budget committee in January 2026. The experience in Ukraine showed that the protection level and the range of the system was not sufficient for the needs. The initial plan was to procure 40 operational systems and two prototypes for an initial sum of €596 million. A new tendering process will be initiated, and will include Hensoldt and Plath in the list of competitors.

The vehicle which was planned to be a 6×6 was in the end modified in an 8×8 and is known as the Knitefish, part of the Protected System for Disrupting Enemy Communications" (GeSys SgK) programme.

=== Germany / Netherlands ===
==== Piranha V 8×8 - SAWFISH ====
The SAWFISH is an ELINT / electronic reconnaissance armoured vehicle. The main contractor for the EW system is Hensoldt Nederlands.

In Germany, this project is lead by the IGEL GbR joint venture that involves Rohde & Schwarz, PLATH, Hensoldt, and GDELS. The project MAUS (Mobile Aufklärungsunterstützungssystem) is focusing on the HF, VHF, UHF, SHF reconnaissance band (1 MHz – 6 GHz) to monitore and find enemy communications.

This initiative involves Germany, Switzerland (November 2025) and Denmark as well.

==== Piranha V 8×8 - KnifeFish ====
The system KnifeFish is designed to disrupt, interfere or suppress with enemy radio systems (VHF, UHF, HF).

Two variants exist, both are based on the Piranha V 8×8:

- VHF/UHF jammer antenna on mast
- HF jammer antenna on mast

The vehicle was selected by the Netherlands in August 2026.. The vehicle purchased was approved by Germany in November 2026 (Geschützte System zum Stören gegnerischer Kommunikation / GeSys SgK)). The purchase contract was signed by both countries in November 2026, but the volume is unknown.

The Swiss Army is joining the Knifefish project in a MoU signed the 14 October 2026.

=== Romania ===
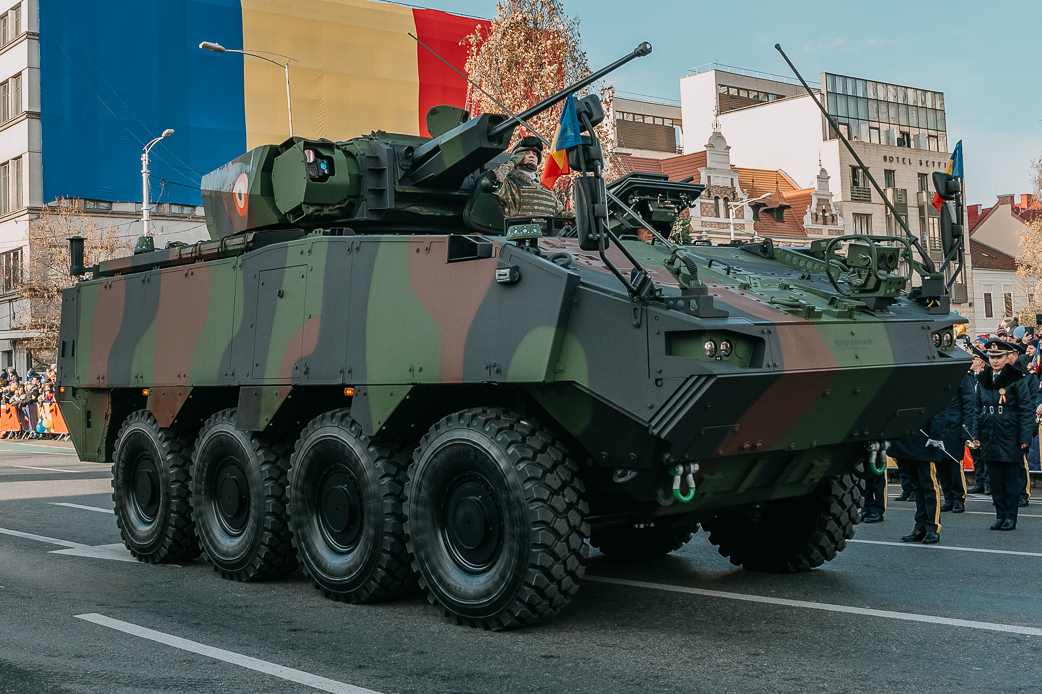
Romanian Piranha V with the Elbit UT30 MK 2 turret

In 2017, Romania signed a 900 million euro contract with General Dynamics European Land Systems (GDELS) for the purchase and production of 227 Piranha V armored personnel carriers in Romania. The joint venture between GDELS and Uzina Mecanică București (UMB) also aims to provide the Piranha V to the export market in the area. Besides production, a military vehicle maintenance section will also operate at UMB.

The first batch of 36 vehicles, was produced at GDELS-Mowag's facilities in Kreuzlingen, Switzerland, 10 of which were assembled in Bucharest. The first batch included 30 vehicles in Infantry Fighting Vehicle configuration equipped with 30 mm cannons, and 6 in mobile command point configuration, and was assigned to the 26th Infantry Battalion in October 2020. A second batch of 32 vehicles assembled at UMB, was received in November 2022. Another 26 Piranhas were received in different configurations, including mortar carriers, equipped with Spear MK2 120 mm mortars, ambulances, CBRN, and recovery vehicles. The rest of the vehicles will be entirely produced in Romania. On 10 February 2023, it was announced that Romania will purchase another 150 Piranha V for an estimated cost of 674 million US dollars. In June 2025, it was reported that 80% of the local production was completed and that UMB will produce another 150 vehicles. A total of 122 vehicles were delivered to the Romanian Army in 2025.

==== Romanian deployments of Piranha V ====
In May 2023, 25 Piranhas of the 26th Infantry Battalion participated in the Anakonda 23 exercise. The Romanian soldiers carried out a 1,000 kilometer march to the Polish training grounds in Nowa Dęba where they trained together with troops from Slovenia, Poland, and the United States.

== Derivatives of the Piranha V ==
=== Piranha V 8×8 - VCR Program ===
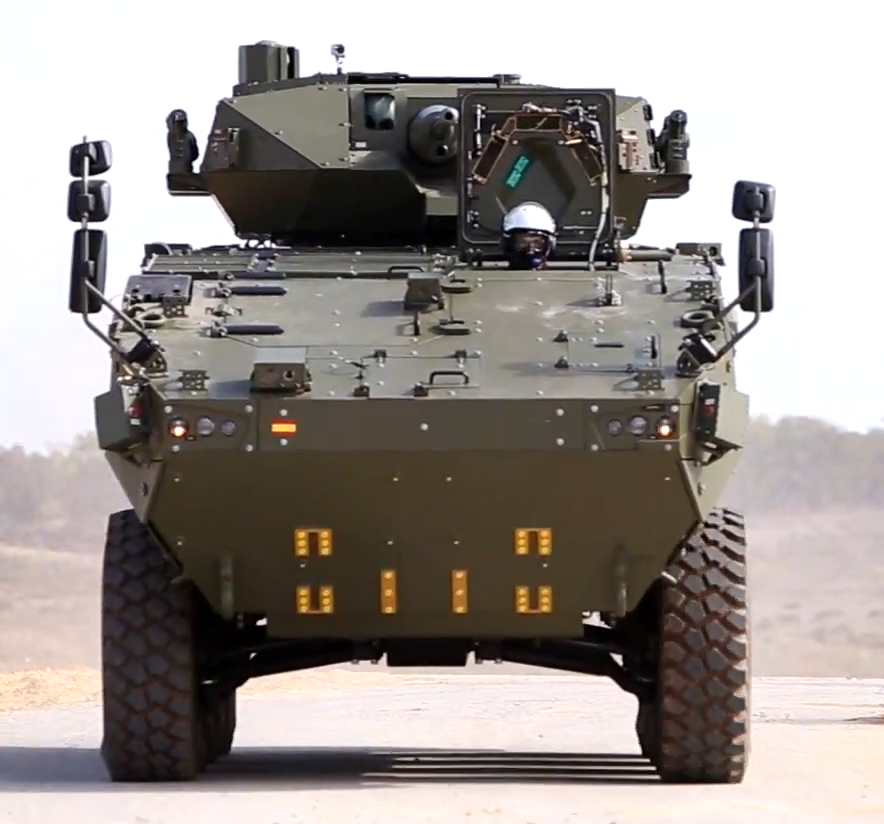
VCR Dragon IFV

Under the Vehículo de Combate sobre Ruedas (VCR) program, the Spanish Ministry of Defence selected a local team in 2015 to develop the future 8×8 armored infantry vehicle which is to replace the old BMR, VEC, and M113 vehicles in the Spanish Army endowment. The team, formed by Indra Sistemas, Sapa Placencia, and the joint venture General Dynamics European Land Systems-Santa Bárbara Sistemas based the vehicle on the Piranha V design.

In 2018, the first 5 demonstrators were received. The contract for the armored vehicle, known as the Dragón by the Spanish Army, was awarded in 2020 for 1.74 billion euros, 733 million of which was awarded to GDLS-SBS. It included 348 vehicles, maintenance and life cycle support, as well as the support for international commercialization. The contract is expected to grow to 1,000 vehicles. The Dragón began trials in 2022, after passing the critical design review. Of the 348, 219 are to be in IFV configuration, 58 reconnaissance vehicles, 49 sappers combat vehicles, and 14 command post vehicles. The deliveries are scheduled to finish by 2027.

The first batch of vehicles was delivered on 20 December 2022. The 7 vehicles were received during a ceremony attended by the Secretary of State for Defence, and the Army Chief of Staff. The vehicles are being produced by TESS Defence, an association between Santa Bárbara Sistemas, Indra Sistemas, Escribano Mechanical & Engineering, and Sapa Placencia.

=== Piranha V 6×6 - Luchs 2 SpähFz NG ===
As part of the programme "SpähFz NG" (Spähfahrzeug Next Generation), the German Army launched a bidding process to find a successor to the Fennek. The competitors were the Rheinmetall TPz Fuchs Evolution and the Patria 6×6 (offered by KNDS Deutschland).

In October 2024, the Piranha was selected by the German Army, and the contract was expected to be signed in early 2025.

The initial plan was for the purchase of 2 prototypes, with a firm contract for 90 vehicles, and an option of 160 vehicles. As of October 2025, the quantity was changed to an order of 356 "Luchs 2 SpähFz NG" vehicles (274 firm and an option for 82 vehicles), and the budget of €3.5 billion was approved by the budget committee of the parliament.

The design of the vehicle is the following:

- Vehicle
  - Piranha V 6×6 chassis
  - Amphibious capability
- Weapon systems
  - Rheinmetall CT-025 turret
  - Stabilised Rheinmetall Oerlikon KBA 25×137 mm autocannon on a light turret.
  - Smoke grenade launchers
  - Potentially loitering ammunitions in the future
  - Rheinmetall SEOSS 210 P optronics system, based on the Theon Sensors SA PHYLAX technology
- Other systems
  - System: Hensoldt Ceretron, integrating the sensors, and generating the tactical situational awareness (supported by AI, NGVA-compliant, software-defined architecture)
    - BAA IV: observation and reconnaissance system with SWIR cameras (short wave infrared for poor weather conditions), thermal and daylight imaging, also using a laser rangefinder and target illuminator.
    - SETAS (See Through Armour System): protecting the crew by detecting the threats early.
  - Mast sensor with:
    - optical and optronic observation systems
    - acoustic sensors
    - electromagnetic sensors:
      - radio detection finder
      - laser warning system
  - D-LBO digital communications / information network of the Bundeswehr.

== Operators ==
=== Summary ===
| Operators (as of February 2026) | Base variant | Quantity ordered | Piranha V Detailed order (unknown quantity) | | | | | | | | | | | | | Deliveries | Retired | Losses | In service |
| Operators (as of February 2026) | Base variant | Quantity ordered | APC | IFV | RECCE | C2 | MEDEVAC | Mortar | Artillery Obs. | SPAAG | CBRN | ARV | Sapper / AEV | Comm. | EW | Deliveries | Retired | Losses | In service |
| Denmark | Piranha V 8×8 | 309 | 131 | 0 | 0 | 110 | 37 | 15 | 0 | 16 | 0 | 0 | 0 | 0 | 0 | 309 | 0 | 0 | 309 |
| Germany | Piranha V 6×6 | 274 | 0 | 0 | 274 | 0 | 0 | 0 | 0 | 0 | 0 | 0 | 0 | 0 | 0 | 0 | 0 | 0 | 0 |
| Germany | Piranha V 8×8 | 58 | 0 | 0 | 0 | 0 | 0 | 0 | 0 | 0 | 0 | 0 | 0 | 58 | N/A | 0 | 0 | 0 | 0 |
| Moldova | Piranha V 8×8 | 5 | 5 | 0 | 0 | 0 | 0 | 0 | 0 | 0 | 0 | 0 | 0 | 0 | 0 | 5 | 0 | 0 | 5 |
| Monaco | Piranha V 8×8 | 2 | 2 | 0 | 0 | 0 | 0 | 0 | 0 | 0 | 0 | 0 | 0 | 0 | 0 | 2 | 0 | 0 | 2 |
| Netherlands | Piranha V 8×8 | N/A | 0 | 0 | 0 | 0 | 0 | 0 | 0 | 0 | 0 | 0 | 0 | 0 | N/A | 0 | 0 | 0 | 0 |
| Romania | Piranha V 8×8 | 227 | 0 | 100 | 0 | (???) | (???) | 19 | 0 | 0 | (???) | (???) | 0 | 0 | 0 | 216 | 0 | 0 | 216 |
| Spain | Dragón VCR | 348 | 0 | 219 | 58 | 14 | 0 | 0 | 8 | 0 | 0 | 0 | 49 | 0 | 0 | 100 | 0 | 0 | 100 |
| Total | | 1,223 | 138 | 319 | 332 | 124 (+???) | 37 (+???) | 34 | 8 | 16 | 0 (+???) | 0 (+???) | 49 | 58 | N/A | 632 | 0 | 0 | 632 |
| Total | | 1,223 | 1,223 | | | | | | | | | | | | | 632 | 0 | 0 | 632 |

Variant ordered, but the quantity in the variant is unknown

=== Current operators ===
Piranha V operators: Current operators Future operators

Denmark (309)
The Piranha V was selected over the CV90 Armadillo the PMMC G5 and the VBCI in 2015. The contract for the order of 309 Piranha V in 6 variants was signed in December 2015 for USD $600 million.
The first Piranha V was delivered to DALO in 2018, and it entered service at the end of March 2019.
The variants used are:
- 131 troop transport, engineering, and mechanic roles
- 110 command and control vehicles (CIS/GEO, internals delivered by MILDEF AB)
- 37 armoured ambulances
- 15 mortar carriers, equipped with the Cardom 120mm mortar system, and the A3MS fire control system delivered by ELSAIT The variants in order include:
- 16 SHORAD vehicles, equipped with the Skyranger 30 turrets, and the Mistral 3 missiles, to be delivered in 2026 / 2027.

Moldova (5)

Moldova received 5 Piranha V APCs in 2026 as a donation through a German cooperation program.

Monaco (2)

Piranha V vehicles are used by the Compagnie des Carabiniers du Prince.
Romania (227)
In January 2018, Romania signed a framework agreement with GDELS for the purchase of 227 Piranha V. The value of the agreement reached €868 million. Six variants are part of the contract:
- 100 Infantry Fighting Vehicles, equipped with Elbit UT30 MK2 unmanned turrets
- 127 others:
  - Command and control vehicles, equipped with Elbit lightweight 12.7mm RCWS
  - 19 Mortar carriers, equipped with Elbit SPEAR 120mm mortar systems
  - Ambulances (MEDEVAC)
  - CBRN reconnaissance vehicles
  - Recovery vehicles
The framework agreement is structured in 3 phases:
1. 30 vehicles produced by GDELS Mowag in Switzerland (all delivered)
2. 64 assembled in Romania under the direction of GDELS (all delivered)
3. 133 to be manufactured by UMB in Romania (all delivered)
As of January 2026, 216 of the 227 vehicles were confirmed delivered, with the remaining vehicles expected to be delivered by February.
Spain (348)
In 2015, a program to replace the VEC-M1, the BMR-M1 and part of the M113 fleet was launched by the Spanish Army. The competitors were the Boxer, the Freccia, the Patria AMV, the Piranha V, the SEP and the VBCI.
In September 2015, the competition was won by GDELS with the Piranha V. In December 2019, the Spanish Government cancelled the program, and relaunched the competition. In August 2020, the Piranha V of GDELS Santa Barbara Sistemas in collaboration with Indra Sistemas and Sapa Placencia won again the competition for a first batch of 348 vehicles for €1.74 billion.
It is known as the Dragon VCR and the orders are split in 3 phases. There are confirmed orders for the phase 1 only:
- Phase 1, 348 confirmed orders, planned to be delivered until 2027
  - 219 VCR, an infantry fighting vehicle
  - 58 VEC, a reconnaissance vehicle
  - 14 VCR-PC, a company command post vehicle
  - 8 VCOAV, an artillery observation post vehicle
  - 49 VCR-ZAP, a sapper combat vehicle

=== Future operators ===
Germany (352)
Piranha V 6×6:
- Luchs 2 (274 firm order, option for 82): The German Army is looking for the successor of the Fennek. Initially the Pandur was favoured by GDELS, but they decided to offer a Piranha instead as Mowag has experience with amphibious vehicles. The competitors were the Rheinmetall TPz Fuchs Evolution and the Patria 6×6 (offered by KNDS Deutschland). In October 2024, the Piranha was selected by the German Army, and the contract is expected to be signed in early 2025. None of those information was made official though. Initially, two prototypes were to be ordered, followed by a first order for 90 vehicles, and an option for 160 vehicles. As of October 2025, the quantity was changed to an order of 356 vehicles (274 firm and an option for 82 vehicles). The budget for this contract is €3.5 billion. Orders:
  - Initial order: 274, signed the 20 October 2025.
Piranha V 8×8:
- TaWAN LBO (58 firm order + option for 198): The budget for the initial tranche was approved in January 2025. It includes electronic systems, trucks with a communication mast, and the Piranha V. The budget approved was of €1.9 million. Orders:
  - Initial order: 58 in February 2025, with deliveries planned for 2026.
- KnifeFish: unknown quantity ordered in November 2026.
Netherlands (Unknown quantity)
- SAWFISH: In June 2026 a contract was signed during ILA Berlin for an unknown quantity. It is a variant to be used for electronic warfare.
- KnifeFish: unknown quantity ordered in November 2026.
Switzerland (Unknown quantity)
Switzerland joined the Sawfish programme in November 2025.
The Swiss Army is joining the Knifefish project in a MoU signed the 14 October 2026.

=== Potential future orders ===
Germany
Piranha V 8×8:
- The German Army plans to replace the Hummel vehicle, a jammer based on the TPz Fuchs with a Piranha 8×8 known as the Knifefish.
Ireland
The Irish Army is looking to replace its 80 Piranha III and its 27 RG-32. Ireland mentions a need of 100 vehicles, a budget of €400 million. The split is unclear at the moment. Among the potential successors are:
- Mowag Eagle V
- Mowag Piranha V
- VBMR-L Serval
- VBCI
- Boxer
Romania (359 potential orders)
In February 2023, it was announced that Romania will purchase an additional 150 Piranha Vs. The order was planned for 2025.
In 2026, it was reported that 359 vehicles will be contracted as follows:
- Phase 1: 139 to be ordered in 2026 and funded through the Security Action for Europe (SAFE) programme. The SAFE funding for the 139 vehicles was rejected by Parliament on 29 May due to the higher price demanded by GDELS.
- Phase 2: 220 to be ordered after 2031.
Spain (650 potential orders)
- Phase 2, 365 to be ordered, with deliveries expected from 2027 to 2035
- Phase 3, 285 to be ordered, with deliveries expected from 2035

=== Failed bids ===
Bulgaria
In 2017, Bulgaria invited companies to submit offers for a future IFV and other combat support vehicles (reconnaissance, combat engineering, ambulance) based on an 8×8 armoured vehicles. Over time, several offers were made by various competitors (GTK Boxer, Mowag Piranha V, Nexter VBCI 2, Patria AMV^{XP}, Freccia, Otokar Arma, FNSS PARS). The Boxer was eliminated with the VBCI in December 2017 because they did not fulfil the conditions of the program, while the Piranha V and the Patria AMV^{XP} did.
After years of discussions and cancellations, an offer made by General Dynamics Land Systems for a much smaller and cheaper Stryker won the contract in September 2023, 183 vehicles for USD $1.37 billion.
Canada
In 2011 GDLS Canada proposed the Piranha V platform for the Canadian CCV programme before the programme was eventually cancelled by the canadian MoD
Lithuania
In 2016, the GTK Boxer was selected over the Iveco SUPERAV, the PARS III, the Patria AMV, the Piranha V, the Stryker and the VBCI-2.
Slovakia
In April 2022, Slovakia submitted a request for information to General Dynamics regarding the Piranha V produced in Romania. The contract failed as the Patria AMV was chosen instead.
Slovenia (106)
Up to 106 APC with a budget of €700 million are to be selected after the contract for the GTK Boxer was cancelled. The finalists of the competition are the Piranha V, the Freccia, the Rosomak L and the Patria AMV^{XP}. A visit of a Slovenian delegation took place in Romania at the production facility in 2024. On 11 July 2024 it was announced that the Patria AMVxp was the winner of the competition.
United Arab Emirates (400)
In 2017, the UAE military ordered 400 Otokar Rabdan 8×8. It was selected over the GTK Boxer, the Patria AMV, the Piranha V and the VBCI in a competition initially intended for 700 vehicles.
United Kingdom
The UK initially participated in the development of the GTK Boxer with Germany and the Netherlands. The collaboration started in 1999. In 2003, the UK decided to leave the development of that vehicle. In 2004, the FRES programme was launched. In June 2007, 3 vehicles were pre-selected for the FRES UV programme, the GTK Boxer, the Piranha V and the VBCI. The Piranha V was selected as preferred bidder in November 2007 and announced in May 2008. It was not followed by orders due to budget crunch, and as of December 2008, the absence of contract meant that the Piranha V was not the preferred bidder anymore.
In 2014, a new programme, the FUV (Future Utility Programme) was launched, and the VBCI was considered again and tested by the UK. But the evaluation did not lead to the selection of the vehicle. In 2018, the UK rejoined the Boxer programme through the MIV programme (Mechanised Infantry Vehicle).

== See also ==
=== Comparable 8×8 vehicles ===
- BTR-4 – (Ukraine)
- Boxer (armoured fighting vehicle) – (Germany, Netherlands)
- CM-32 armoured vehicle – (Taiwan)
- Eitan AFV – (Israel)
- FNSS Pars – (Turkey)
- Freccia IFV – (Italy)
- Iveco SuperAV – (Italy)
- K808 White Tiger – (South Korea)
- LAV 6 – (Canada)
  - Stryker – (United States, Canada)
- Mowag Piranha III – (Switzerland)
  - Mowag Piranha IV – (Switzerland)
- Otokar Arma – (Turkey)
- Pandur II – (Austria)
- Patria AMV – (Finland)
  - KTO Rosomak – (Poland)
- TATA Kestrel – (India)
- Terrex ICV – (Singapore)
- VBCI – (France)
- VPK-7829 Bumerang – (Russia)
