= Bowman (communications system) =

British Armed Forces tactical communications system

Bowman is the name of the tactical communications system used by the British Armed Forces.

The Bowman C4I system consists of a range of HF radio, VHF radio and UHF radio sets designed to provide secure integrated voice, data services to dismounted soldiers, individual vehicles and command HQs up to Division level. Bowman has a number of specific applications installed on the base radio infrastructure known as BISAs. Bowman has been released incrementally as a number of phased capability releases, known as BCIP releases, with BCIP 5.5 being released in the field in 2013.

Bowman replaced the Clansman series of radios. As of 2016, the MoD publicised plans to replace Bowman with a system named Morpheus.

== Procurement history ==
The concept of Bowman dates from a 1989 UK MoD General Staff Requirement (GSR) for a system to replace the ageing Clansman radio system. The GSR was subsequently modified to accommodate post Cold War scenarios.

The procurement had a long and chequered history, with a number of consortia involved in the development and bidding process. This process culminated in the failure in 2000 of the preferred bidder, Archer, to deliver the requirement within budget and on time, and the resultant cessation of the contract by the UK MoD. The subsequent rebidding process for the contract was won by CDC Systems UK Ltd, once a subsidiary of Computing Devices Canada (CDC), now General Dynamics United Kingdom Ltd as prime contractor.

The resultant system was based on some aspects of CDC's Iris Digital Communications System, created for the Canadian Army, with elements of design and manufacturing sub-contracted to: Cogent Defence Systems (now Airbus Defence and Space); SELEX Communications (then Selex ES, in turn merged in Leonardo S.p.A., previously Finmeccanica since 2016); ITT Exelis (now Harris Corporation); Harris Corporation; L-3 Communications; Blazepoint; DRS Tactical Systems; BAE Systems; GDC4S; and Thales Group. AgustaWestland was responsible for training installations and classrooms for the conversion training. The procurement cost of the supply and (initial) support phase for Bowman was approximately £1.9 billion and the current acquisition cost of the whole project is £2.4 billion.

Bowman’s initial operating capability was delivered into service in March 2004, it was fully rolled out across the Armed Forces by the end of 2008.

As a result of delays to the replacement Morpheus system, Bowman will be upgraded again under the Bowman 5.7 project started in 2024. Bowman's out of service date was extended from 2026 to between 2031 and 2035 when Morpheus is delivered. The upgrade includes provision of secure internet access on the battlefield.

== System overview ==
Bowman provides a tactical voice and data communications system for joint operations across the British Armed Forces in support of land and amphibious operations. It is fitted to over 15,000 military vehicles, from Land Rover Wolf to the Challenger 2 Main Battle Tank. The entire Royal Navy fleet is fitted with Bowman equipment as are all the major helicopter types supporting land operations, such as Apache, Chinook, Merlin and Lynx. Bowman features enhanced communications security (COMSEC) through integrated voice and data encryption devices and enhanced electronic protective measures through features such as frequency-hopping spread spectrum. It also provides tactical situational awareness for commanders through GPS links, helping to reduce the probability of friendly fire. The cryptographic core is based on a Pritchel II High Grade algorithm designed by CESG. The complete contract involves more than 48,000 radios (excluding the 45,000 Personal Role Radios) and more than 30,000 computer terminals being installed in more than 30,000 platforms, together with the necessary training of around 75,000 Service personnel. The Bowman system is a fundamental part of the British Military, achieving a Network Enabled Capability, providing the carriers for the passage of data between the various software applications involved. It is related to the Future Integrated Soldier Technology concept.

The procurement and support of Bowman is led by the Tactical Systems (TacSys) delivery team, for many years within Defence Equipment and Support, now part of Information Systems & Services at MoD Abbey Wood.

== Equipment ==
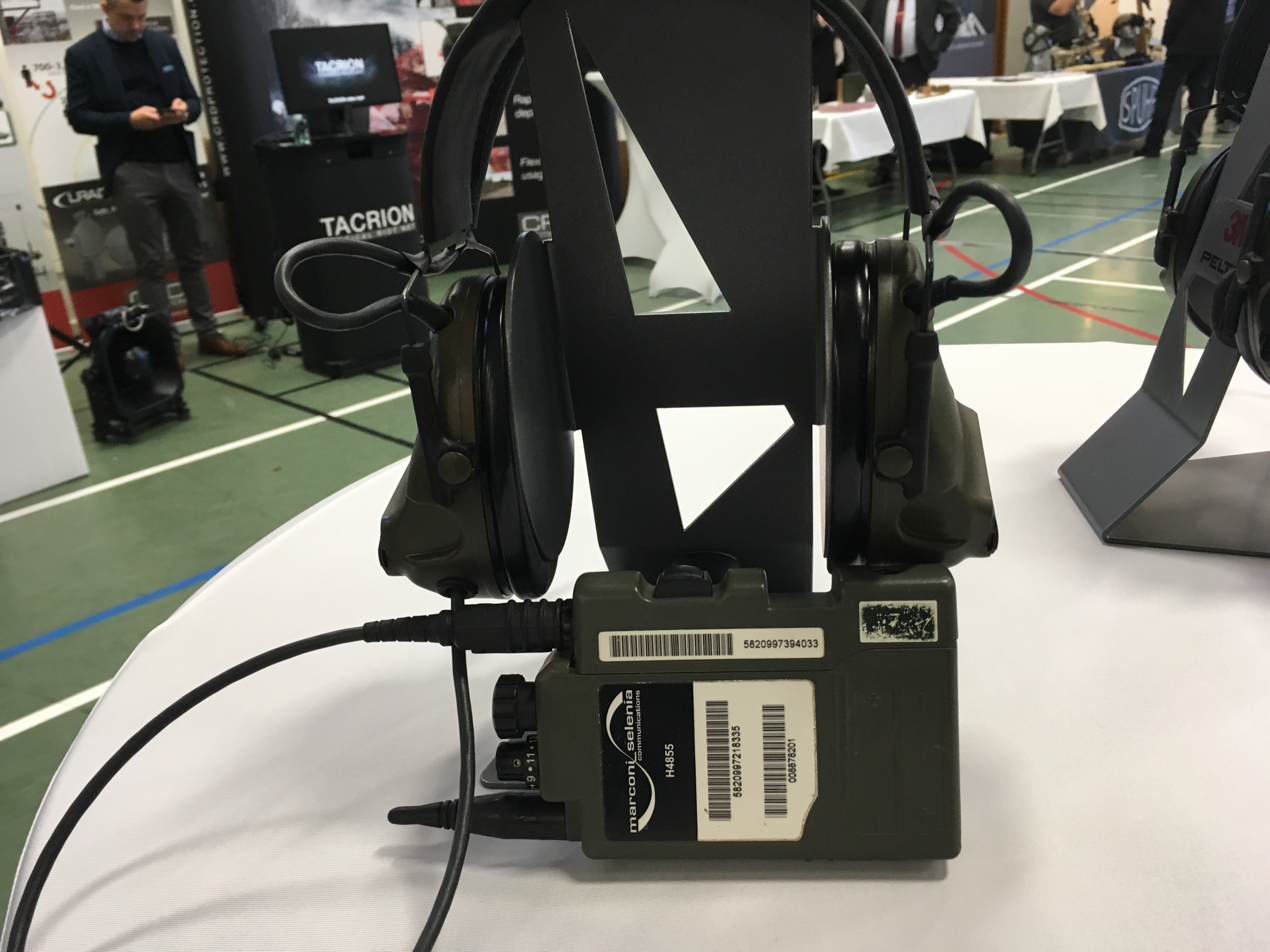
H4855 Personal Role Radio

Nominally the lowest deployed part of the Bowman series of radios is that provided by Leonardo-Finmeccanica (previously Selex ES), in the form of the UHF H4855 Personal Role Radio (PRR), which is primarily used by infantry fireteam (section level and below). PRR is only partially connected with the Bowman programme, as it was hived off from the acquisition process in October 1999 for more rapid implementation, and the first of 45,000 units formally entered service in early 2002. Operating in the 2.4 GHz band, PRR had no integrated encryption devices and does not intercommunicate with the rest of the Bowman network, but is widely acclaimed as having revolutionised intra-squad communications and small-unit tactics.

Models are designated "UK/PRC", which stands for "United Kingdom / Portable Radio Communications", or "UK/VRC", which is "United Kingdom / Vehicle Radio Communications". Following this logic "UK/ARC" stands for "United Kingdom / Airborne Radio Communications".

=== VHF radios ===
- VPT - a UK Type 1 (Pritchel) encrypted section to platoon-level UK/PRC354 5W VHF Portable Transceiver (VPT)
- ADR+ - an enhanced and improved 'Bowmanised' version of ITT Corporation's company/squadron-level Single Channel Ground and Airborne Radio System ( SINCGARS) frequency-hopping radio with a 30-87.975 MHz frequency range. Depending on its configuration, the ADR+ is variously designated UK/PRC355 (5 W manpack), UK/PRC356 (16 W ground-role manpack), UK/VRC357 (16 W vehicle clip-in radio), UK/VRC358 (16 W low-power vehicle radio), or UK/VRC359 (50 W vehicle-mounted high-power radio).

The manpack version of the ADR+ has an Automatic Situational Awareness Module inserted in BCIP 5.2 which enables Own Station Position Reports to be broadcast without the presence of an associated computer.

Under the terms of the baseline contract, ITT Defence delivered some 26,000 ADR+ radios and 8,000 VPTs, complemented by 580 examples of the UK/ARC341 VHF aircraft role radio (a derivative of the company's SINCGARS AN/ARC-201D airborne transceiver) for helicopter platforms.

=== HF radios ===
The HF PRC 325 is based on the Harris RF-5800H model

The Bowman HF frequency-hopping radios, of which 10,800 examples were supplied is designated UK/PRC325 in its basic 20 W manpack form and UK/VRC328/9 in its 100 W high-power and co-sited vehicular configurations. Essentially a UK equivalent of the US AN/PRC-150, it has had the proprietary Harris Citadel encryption from the original RF-5800H replaced with UK Type 1 (Pritchel) encryption and frequency hopping waveform. The Falcon II's original dual-band HF/VHF frequency range (1.6-60 MHz) has been narrowed to the 1.6-30 MHz (HF) band.

=== HCDR ===
The top tier in the Bowman series of radios is provided by the UHF, Mobile ad hoc network ITT UK/VRC340 HCDR (High Capacity Data Radio), a 'Bowmanised' version of ITT's Mercury Near-Term Data Radio (NTDR) wide-band networking transceiver. HCDR has a 225-450 MHz operating frequency range. It has wideband (4 MHz) and narrow band (500 kHz) modem configurations, with a user rate of 288 kbit/s on a 375 kbit/s channel and 576 kbit/s on a 750 kbit/s channel. Some 3,600 HCDRs were purchased. HCDR provides a self-managing mobile Internet Backbone using standard RFC interfaces and routing protocols.

=== Ancillary equipment ===
Provision of the associated User Data Terminal (UDT) for vehicular and static use was contracted to DRS Tactical Systems Inc, which also produces the Bowman Management Data Terminal (BMDT) for network management, the Vehicle User Data Terminal (VUDT) with keyboard and touchscreen for use on the move, the Staff User Data Terminal (SUDT) for command centres, and the PBISA Processing Unit (PBPU) for Challenger 2 tanks.

Since the start of the programme, the capabilities of the UDTs (based on 700 MHz Pentium processors) have evolved, their original 256 MB RAMs and 20 GB drives having been superseded by 512 MB RAMs and 40 GB drives. The contractor for supply of Portable User Data Terminal (PUDTs), based on a 266 MHz Intel StrongARM processor, was L-3 Communications. The PUDT is now obsolete and is not used. Extensive problems with the software running on low powered computers led to the procurement of a number of enhanced computers, the Lightweight Tablet (LTDT) manufactured by Blazepoint and Lightweight Manpack (LMDT) produced by L-3. In addition to processing limitations, the larger UDTs have significant ergonomic issues and were supplemented with a buy of General Dynamics Itronix computers modified in the UK by Blazepoint to support systems managers and communication planners.

Responsibility for the supply of Bowman audio ancillaries, including the stereo staff-user headset, noise-cancelling general-purpose handset, and loudspeaker unit, was vested in Selex ES, which also provided the lightweight headset, respirator adapter, and remote pressel switch associated with the PRR.

Racal (now Thales Group) provided antennas for the Bowman contract. These include HF Wire/Vehicle, VHF Vehicle/Elevated, VHF Ground Spike, 5.4 metre GRP Mast and UHF Vehicle/Elevated Antennas. Additional antennas supplied as part of the Bowman contract are the man-pack antennas, which are supplied together with the matching unit by MGS Precision, based in Stone, Staffordshire.

=== BISAs ===
Bowman also consists of a number of specifically designed Battlefield Information System Applications running over the Bowman infrastructure. The UDTs (User Data Terminals) are currently limited to supporting a maximum of two BISAs simultaneously, due to the performance limitations of the UDTs. ComBAT, produced by GDC4S in the US, the main Command and Control (C2) tool for Bowman has faced early criticism relating to performance, ease of use and interface design. A significant portion of these problems have been addressed in later version of ComBAT. BISAs include - ComBAT (C2 & situational awareness (SA), GBAD (Ground Based Air Defence) Command & Control, Makefast (Engineering) and FC (Fire Control).

== Controversy ==
When Bowman was first introduced into service, the system was said to contain many faults to the extent that troops dubbed Bowman "Better Off With Map And Nokia".

The programme came under scrutiny following a National Audit Office accountability hearing for the government's procurement policy and was generally considered to be a success considering the complexity and changing needs of the UK Armed Forces.

A 2007 report by the Commons Public Accounts Committee was overwhelmingly critical of the entire system and its procurement. The report itself was split into four sections entitled: "programme governance arrangements were not fit for purpose", "initial decisions were not well informed", "through life costs were not rigorously assessed", and "operational benefits are limited".

As Bowman was being phased into service, senior officers in the British Army had serious reservations about the system, especially as many of their initial design specifications and feedback had not been adequately incorporated by the Defence Procurement Agency in the re-tendering process that was won by General Dynamics United Kingdom. Such were the misgivings, that the Director of Infantry initially refused to accept the portable "manpack" radio into service, saying:

All the rumours you've heard. It is as bad as you've heard. But we have been told that, politically, we have got to make it work. Now you guys will have to go out and find a way of making it work.

— Brigadier Jamie Balfour

Other complaints were brought up by the 1st Battalion Royal Anglian Regiment, who tested the UK/PRC354 radio system in July 2005. A number of problems have been reported, including RF burns received while transmitting data on some settings, comparatively heavy compared to equivalent Clansman radio sets, unergonomic wiring and user interfaces on the manpack radio, short-lived batteries, inadequate "ruggedisation" and inflexibility with assigning unique call sign indicators to individuals which are now instead permanently programmed into the radios themselves instead of the Clansman BATCO assigned system, which would change every 12 hours and could be used on any number of different radio sets by the operator as required. This has led to seven modifications to the radio since the operational field trial in December 2004. However, there have been other, more recent reports of the radios continuing to suffer from the already mentioned design flaws, as well as operational failures and faults, including whilst in the midst of combat engagements, consequently hampering the combat effectiveness with soldiers deployed on both Operation Herrick in Afghanistan and Operation Telic in Iraq, leading to accusations that the system was not ready for operational use and in some cases the releases were unsuitable for their intended purpose, including the role as part of the Future Integrated Soldier Technology concept.

In December 2008 and January 2009, Bowman was withdrawn from the Territorial Army (apart from the Honourable Artillery Company, 43 (Wessex) Signal Squadron (V) - a TA squadron forming part of 21 Signal Regiment, 2 (National Communications) Signal Brigade and the Yeomanry) as the manufacturers struggled to meet the demand created by operations in both Iraq and Afghanistan.

== Future replacement ==
In 2016, the MoD publicised plans to replace Bowman with a system named Morpheus. Morpheus "will deliver the next generation of Tactical Communication and Information Systems (TacCIS) capability. It will address critical system obsolescence and introduce a more agile TacCIS solution (both technical and business)."
