= Future Integrated Soldier Technology =

2003 British Army equipment project

The Future Integrated Soldier Technology (or FIST), sometimes incorrectly referred to as the Future Infantry System Technology or Future Infantry Soldier Technology, was a project by the British Army which aims to enhance the infantry's combat effectiveness in the 21st century as part of the Future Soldier project. The contract was awarded to Thales in March 2003.

The goal is to integrate a modular system of all equipment, weapons and their sighting systems, radios that the individual soldier carries or uses, in order to increase their overall effectiveness on the battlefield.

The programme is managed by the Dismounted Close Combat Integrated Project Team at Defence Equipment and Support, MoD Abbey Wood in Bristol.

== Subsystems ==
A major complement of the FIST project is the Bowman communications system, which gives secure communications to the troops on the ground, allowing for simultaneous transmission of voice and data and having built-in GPS equipment, as well as sending visual information direct from personal cameras.

The kit aims to cover five main areas:

- Command and Control
- Lethality
- Mobility
- Survivability
- Sustainability

Command and Control is aimed to improve fire team and local commanders' awareness of the situation. Lethality is as the name suggests and includes new weapon systems such as the (then) new NLAW and Javelin anti tank weapons and the new sights for the SA80. Mobility includes areas such as route planning and GPS locations, survivability includes armour and stealth and sustainability includes areas such as power supplies with the system aiming to run off new next generation power cells.

The Surveillance and Target Acquisition (STA) element of FIST was contracted to Thales to deliver a range of sights, target locators, periscopes and digital cameras in 2010–2014 at a cost of £150 million. They equip nearly 11,000 troops from all three services.

== Timescales ==
The project aimed to deploy a suite of digitized weapon platforms by 2008. The first major trials of the FIST system were completed at the Salisbury Plain Training Area in January 2005, when 70 soldiers were equipped with the prototype FIST technology including GPS, communications and weapon sights, and compared to the effectiveness of 70 conventionally equipped soldiers. A further FIST V2 trial was scheduled for 2006.

35,000 sets of kit were expected to be bought and issued between 2015 and 2020. This equipment was designed to bring the British infantryman up to standards and link with new technology currently employed, including the new underslung grenade launcher for the SA80 and the deployed Bowman communications network. It was not intended that every soldier be equipped with FIST: instead unit commanders would request FIST kits as necessary so they can be tailored to the situation and mission aims.

As well as linking into the new technology for the soldier, it was designed to link in with other communications systems as well as the UK UAV project called Watchkeeper.

== Dismounted Situational Awareness ==
In 2016, the MoD publicised plans to replace the existing Bowman with a system named Morpheus. Morpheus "will deliver the next generation of Tactical Communication and Information Systems (TacCIS) capability. It will address critical system obsolescence and introduce a more agile TacCIS solution (both technical and business).". The element of Morpheus that handles communications for the infantry soldier is known as Dismounted Situational Awareness (DSA).

== See also ==
- Infantryman 2000
