= Future Rapid Effect System =

British Army armoured fighting vehicle programme

The Future Rapid Effect System (FRES) was the name for the British Ministry of Defence (MOD) programme to deliver a fleet of more than 4,000 armoured fighting vehicles for the British Army. The vehicles were to be rapidly deployable, network-enabled, capable of operating across the spectrum of operations, and protected against current threats. The programme has now been split into two separate procurement projects for a reconnaissance Specialist Vehicle (SV) and an aspiration for a future Utility Vehicle (UV). The General Dynamics Ajax was selected to fulfill the SV requirement in 2016.

== History ==
The total FRES fleet was to be divided into two main parts, the Utility Variant (FRES UV) and the Specialist Variant (FRES SV). These types were broken down into families of vehicles: The Utility Variant comprises protected mobility, command and control, light armoured support, repair and recovery and medical. The Specialist Variant comprises RECCE Block 1 (Scout, armoured personnel carrier, repair, recovery and Common Base Platform) and RECCE Block 2 (Joint Fires Direction, Command Post and Engineer Recce).

Despite long delays in the procurement process, exacerbated by a budget shortfall at the MoD, the FRES programme is moving ahead with the award of the Specialist Vehicle contract to General Dynamics UK for the ASCOD AFV tracked vehicle in March 2010.

Due to the complexity of the FRES programme, a "System of Systems" Integrator (SOSI) was appointed to assist the MoD in the selection of the vehicles and cross-vehicle electronic architecture. In October 2007, the FRES SOSI contract was awarded to a joint team of Thales and Boeing.

The SOSI team was contracted to act as an independent, honest broker between industry and the MoD to co-ordinate the procurement of more than 3,000 vehicles which were expected to be acquired under FRES.

Six main elements of the SOSI role were: programme management; systems of systems engineering and integration; alliance development and management; development of the MoD's SOSI competence; through-life capability management; and through-life technology management.

The SOSI role was scrapped when the programme was restructured following the failure to progress with the UV procurement.

=== FRES Utility Vehicle ===
The first family of vehicles, known as the Utility Vehicles (UV) were expected to enter service in the 2010s. FRES UV was to have replaced the Army's Saxon wheeled APC, the tracked FV432, and some of the CVR(T) vehicle family. The design is planned to follow the philosophy of "medium weight" forces that balance ease of transportability ("light") with armour ("heavy").

==== FRES UV competition ====
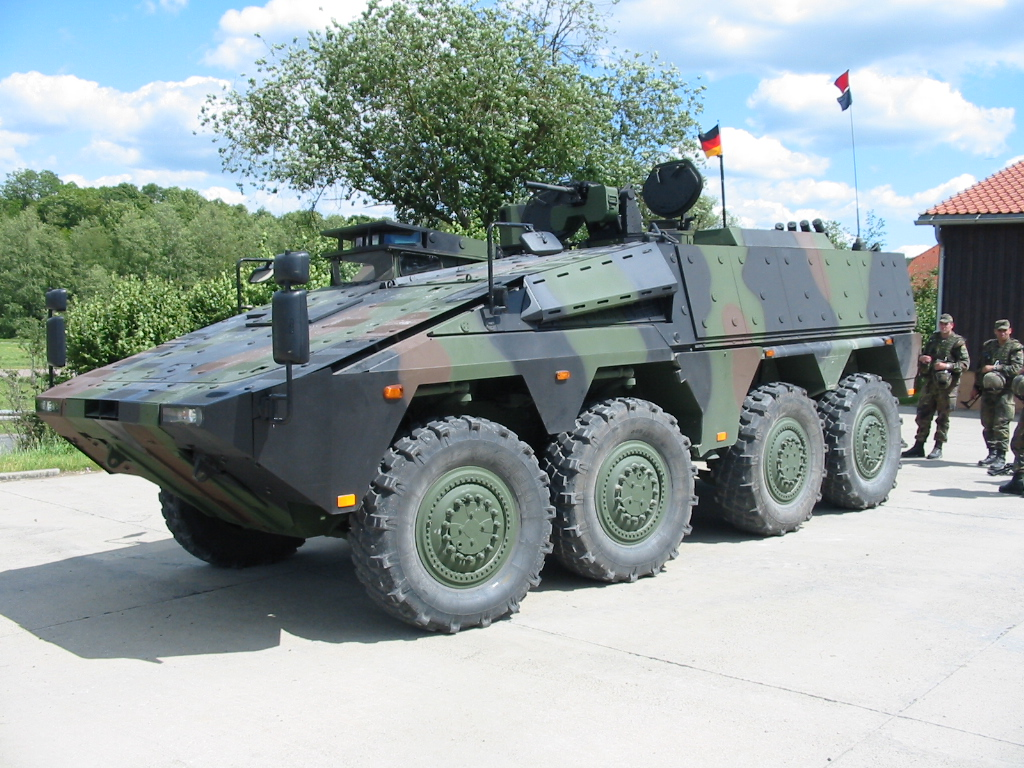
A GTK Boxer of the German Army

In 1999, Germany and United Kingdom began development of the Boxer Multi Role Armoured Vehicle, which was intended to assume different roles via switchable modules. The UK withdrew from the project in 2003, stating that the Boxer did not fulfill requirements. The British Ministry of Defence decided to pursue a replacement, with a specification that it could be airlifted by Airbus A400M and smaller C-130 Hercules transport aircraft. The new "Future Rapid Effect System" project was established in May 2004, with an assessment period of two years.

Since then, the Defence Science and Technology Laboratory has been researching electric armour, with the view of ultimately integrating it into the FRES design. Plans for FRES vehicles to be carried by C-130 were dropped for being unworkable.

In June 2007, the then Minister of State for Defence Equipment and Support, Lord Drayson, announced that three vehicles had been selected for trials to determine the utility vehicle design for FRES UV. These were:

- Boxer, built by ARTEC Germany.
- Piranha V, built by General Dynamics UK.
- VBCI, built by Nexter (France).

==== Response to criticism ====
In a defence briefing on 14 June 2007, Lord Drayson made it clear that FRES UV would not be the standard off-the-shelf version of any of these vehicles:

They are designs which are currently in development to provide new models within existing families of vehicles. I am sure you agree that it would make no sense to invent a new vehicle from scratch. The designs we will look at in the trials this summer take proven vehicles, and evolve them to the next level to have the capacity, mobility, ability to upgrade through life, and, above all, the level of protection the Army need.

In FRES UV it was envisaged that a further role, that of the "vehicle integrator", would be required to ensure that the vehicles are customised to meet British Army requirements and be supported and upgraded through their life. A number of companies positioned for this role, including BAE Systems and General Dynamics. When the programme was restructured this was no longer envisaged as a separate role.

==== FRES UV Preferred Bidder ====
The announcement of the winning design was initially planned for November 2007. The selection was announced in May 2008. The winning design provisionally selected for the FRES Utility Vehicle contract was the Mowag Piranha V, manufactured by General Dynamics. This decision had been expected, with speculation from February 2008 onwards that General Dynamics was the preferred contractor for the deal. However, as no production order was announced, various sources "feared that the FRES programme had fallen victim to the UK defence "budget crunch". This was borne out in December 2008, when General Dynamics' status as preferred contractor for the Utility Vehicle contract was rescinded.

=== Demise of FRES as a programme ===
After General Dynamics had its preferred bidder status for UV withdrawn in December 2008, the Ministry of Defence decided to restructure the programme. The utility vehicle programme was scheduled to restart towards the end of 2010. The UK MoD's Defence Equipment and Support agency focused its attention on the tracked variants of the FRES programme, most notably the Specialist Vehicle.

The FRES Integrated Project Team, based at MoD Abbey Wood, disbanded, and the SV was joined with the Warrior Capability Sustainment Programme (WCSP) in a new procurement team named Medium Armoured Tracks Team (MATT). The two programmes share the Common Cannon and Ammunition Programme, whereby a new 40mm Cannon from CTAI will be the main armament to both the upgraded Warriors and the new Specialist Vehicle.

With the demise of the UV procurement, the supporting roles of SOSI and VI were no longer required, and were not pursued as part of the overall procurement scheme. FRES as an overarching programme effectively no longer exists, with future UV and SV projects being separate armored vehicle procurements.

== Future Utility Vehicle ==
In February 2014, France agreed to lend a few VBCIs to the British Army for testing. French military sources report that the British Army is interested in purchasing the vehicle. The French Ministry of Defense has indicated that the French Army may purchase the British Watchkeeper WK450 unmanned aerial vehicle if the British Army buys the VBCI. The British Army is testing the VBCI as part of the future utility vehicle programme, intended to start replacing the current fleet of protected mobility vehicles by 2022. FRES UV has now been renamed as the Mechanised Infantry Vehicle programme.

== Specialist Vehicle SCOUT SV ==
The Specialist Vehicles (SV) procurement will provide a range of vehicles including reconnaissance, engineering and battlefield medical variants, based on a tracked chassis. The CV90, offered by BAE Systems, and the ASCOD SV, offered by General Dynamics UK, were put forward as potential reconnaissance vehicles. In November 2008, they were awarded assessment-phase contracts .

In July 2009, the MoD invited BAE Systems and General Dynamics UK to help it develop new reconnaissance vehicles for the British Army as part of the FRES Scout Vehicles programme.

In March 2010, the MoD awarded General Dynamics UK a development contract to build the SCOUT SV. BAE Systems fought to reverse the decision by announcing it would move manufacturing from Sweden to its Newcastle factory. The £500M contract for the demonstration phase of 7 prototype vehicles was announced in July 2010. Trials were expected to start in 2013. The PMRS version of Scout was revealed during the 2014 exhibition.

In September 2014, the British Ministry of Defence will sign a £3.5 billion (US $5.8 billion) deal with General Dynamics UK for 589 Scout SV platforms. These will include Reconnaissance and Strike variants, Joint Fire Control variants, Ground Based Surveillance variants, Armoured Personnel Carrier (APC) variants, Command and Control (C2) variants, Formation Reconnaissance Overwatch variants, Engineer Reconnaissance variants, Recovery and Repair variants. The Scout SV was later renamed as Ajax.

== See also ==
- Mechanised Infantry Vehicle, UK Army program
- MOWAG Piranha family tree
- Stryker
- Freccia IFV
- Future Combat Systems Manned Ground Vehicles
- BCT Ground Combat Vehicle Program
