= Morpheus (communications system) =

British Armed Forces communication system project

Morpheus is the name of the programme that will deliver the next generation tactical communications system to the British Armed Forces.

In 2016, the MoD publicised plans to replace the existing Bowman communications system with a system named Morpheus. The Morpheus programme was supposed to be operational by 2025, but has been mired in delays and is now not expected to enter service until the next decade.

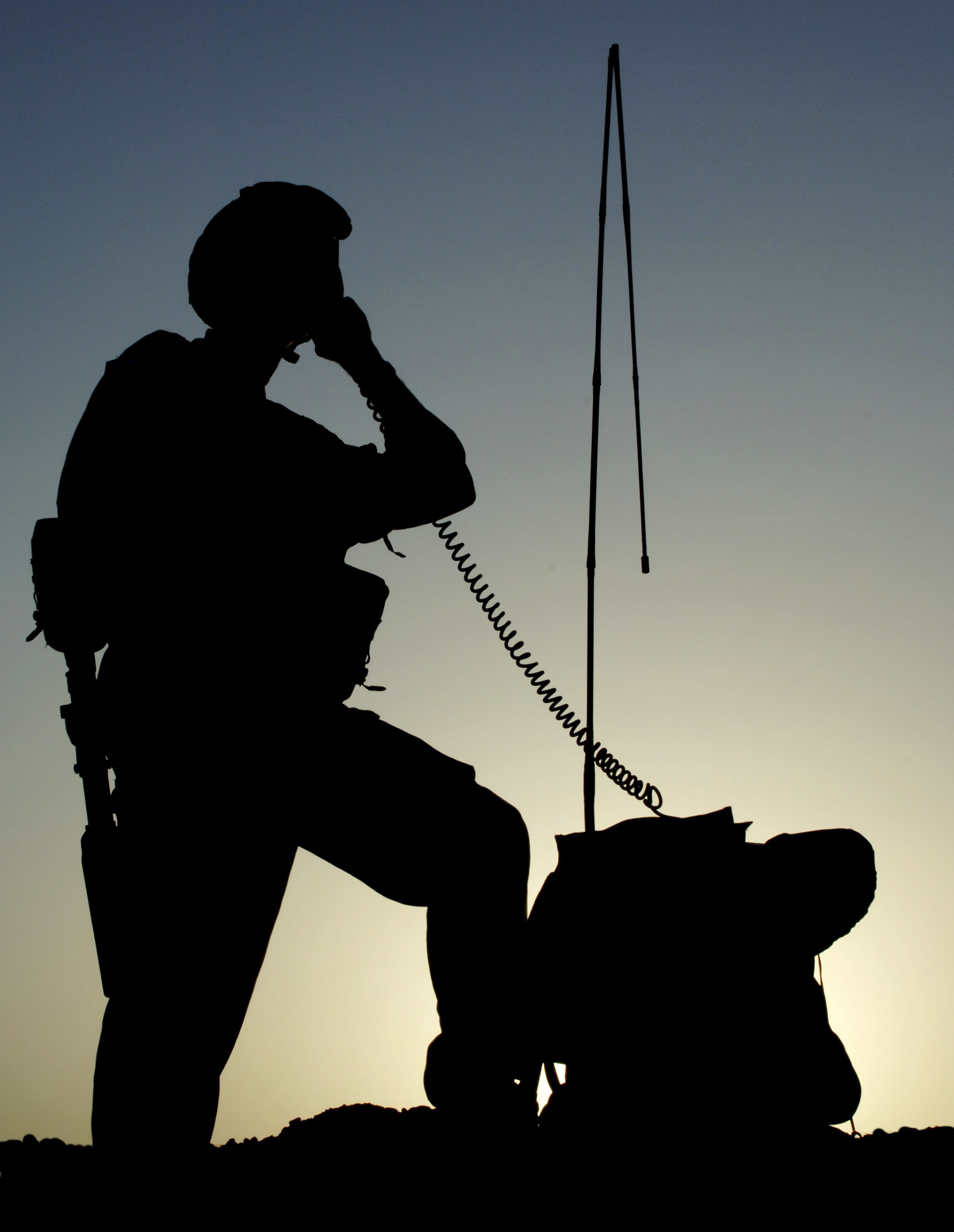
216 Signal Sqn soldier operating Bowman 325 HF man pack radio, which is to be replaced by Morpheus.

== Procurement history ==
The procurement of Morpheus is being led by the Battlefield And Tactical Communications and Information Systems (BATCIS) Delivery Team, part of Defence Digital, formerly the Information Systems & Services (ISS), at MoD Abbey Wood.

In November 2014 an acquisition strategy paper was released which described a two-part assessment phase to examine the feasibility of the principal approaches of "Sustain", "Evolve", or "Replace" the Bowman system.

A "Systems House" branded Neo was appointed following a competition, comprising a consortium of PA Consulting, QinetiQ, Roke Manor Research and CGI. Their role was:

to generate high level technical architectures and business constructs against the MORPHEUS requirement and to provide corresponding performance, cost, time and risk data, with requirement impact assessment, to enable the Authority to assess Acquisition Options and identify requirement trades.

In September 2015, it was announced that the "Replace" option was not viable and that the chosen approach was to evolve from Bowman through the appointment of a transition partner and other suppliers, to deliver an open agile system, which would be known as Evolve to Open (EvO).

The £330m contract for EvO was awarded to General Dynamics UK in April 2017.

In December 2023, the contract with General Dynamics UK was cancelled as, according to the MoD, GDUK failed to fulfil its contractual obligations, including delivering a large-scale laboratory-tested baseline capability by December 2020. With the original timescale “not met” and progress having “fallen short of what we expected”, the contract was subsequently “concluded” with the company, Minister for Defence Procurement James Cartlidge said in a written statement to UK Parliament.

=== Delays ===
Morpheus was initially scheduled to enter service by 2025. However, because of the issues with EvO TP, the out-of-service date for Bowman will now be “extended out to no later than 2035, and no earlier than 2031, to bridge the capability gap until Morpheus delivers”, Minister for Defence Procurement James Cartlidge said. No date has been set for when Morpheus will be operational.

As a result of the delays, the Bowman communications system, which has been in service since the early 2000s, will be upgraded again under the Bowman 5.7 project.

The delays force the MOD to bring new vehicles such as Challenger 3, Boxer, Ajax and other vehicles into service with Bowman.

== System overview ==
Morpheus EvO will be based on Bowman version 5.6, and will evolve to be an open, modular system. It will connect deployed forces to their commanders, give improved access to operational IT systems and simplify the user experience. An open systems approach will allow new technologies such as radios and apps to be rapidly integrated to tackle emerging threats and enhance interoperability with allies.

The element of Morpheus that handles communications for the infantry soldier is known as Dismounted Situational Awareness (DSA), and is a successor to the long-running Future Integrated Soldier Technology programme.

== See also ==
- British Armed Forces communications and information systems
- Royal Corps of Signals
- List of equipment of the British Army
