= Mechanised Infantry Vehicle =

Vehicle concept of British Army

The Mechanised Infantry Vehicle (MIV) is the British Army's concept of an 8 × 8 wheeled vehicle. In March 2018 the United Kingdom rejoined the Boxer (armoured fighting vehicle) programme in order to move to an assessment phase, which may see the Boxer selected.

In July 2018 the UK MoD disclosed its intent to order between 400 and 600 Boxers in four variants, plus driver training vehicles, reference vehicles and support. The contract will contain options to increase the quantity of vehicles by up to an additional 900.

In September 2018, UK Defence Minister Stuart Andrew announced that Artec had been given the go-ahead to invite industry to bring forward actual contractible proposals for work on Boxer, allowing Artec to complete their supplier selection process before returning to the MOD with a formal proposal in 2019. Figures remain as 'over 500' and with the first vehicles to be in-service by 2023.

== Background ==
The MIV concept arose through the Future Rapid Effect System (FRES) programme, which was to deliver 4,000 vehicles to replace the British Army's reconnaissance and Combat Vehicle Reconnaissance (Tracked) (CVR(T)) fleet. The FRES Utility Vehicle (UV) programme was to create armoured personnel carriers to replace vehicles such as the tracked FV432 and wheeled Saxon armoured personnel carriers and CVR(T) variants such as the FV103 Spartan armoured personnel carrier.

The winning design provisionally selected for the FRES Utility Vehicle contract was the Piranha V, manufactured by General Dynamics. No production order was announced, and the programmes were later restructured and then failed to restart. FRES was cancelled and split into two vehicle programmes: SCOUT which was later the Ajax (Scout SV) and the Utility Vehicle.

=== Army 2020 plan ===
After the Strategic Defence and Security Review 2010, then Lieutenant General Nick Carter formed the Army 2020 concept to shape the British Army. That plan envisioned three "Armoured Infantry Brigades" each with a Heavy Protected Mobility battalion. This unit would have Mastiff vehicles and later, "Utility Vehicle[s]" or UV, the concept from FRES UV.

=== Mechanised Infantry Vehicle (MIV) ===
The UV programme later transformed into the MIV programme. In September 2015, Chief of the General Staff General Sir Nick Carter mentioned to reporters that the British Army wished to revive the UV through a MIV programme. This was further confirmed in the 2015 Strategic Defence and Security Review fact sheets. The MIV vehicles, along with the Ajax (Scout SV) vehicles, will form two new Strike Brigades.

== Design and characteristics ==
Several news articles had speculated that it might be based on the design of the French VBCI infantry fighting vehicle. In February 2014, France agreed to lend a few VBCIs to the British Army for testing. French military sources reported that the British Army is interested in purchasing the vehicle. General Dynamics Land Systems offered a vehicle, while ST Kinetics offered its Terrex as a variant. The Boxer and Patria AMV X were favourites, as well.

In March 2018 the British Army rejoined the Boxer programme. The Boxer is an eight-wheeled multirole vehicle, consisting of two key elements: the platform/drive-line and the removable mission module. The mission module is a key feature of Boxer, it allowing the vehicle to be rapidly changed to meet different operational requirements. Mission modules are attached by four points and can be swapped within an hour under field conditions.

== See also ==
- General Dynamics Ajax
