= Mobile communications vehicle =

Emergency vehicle

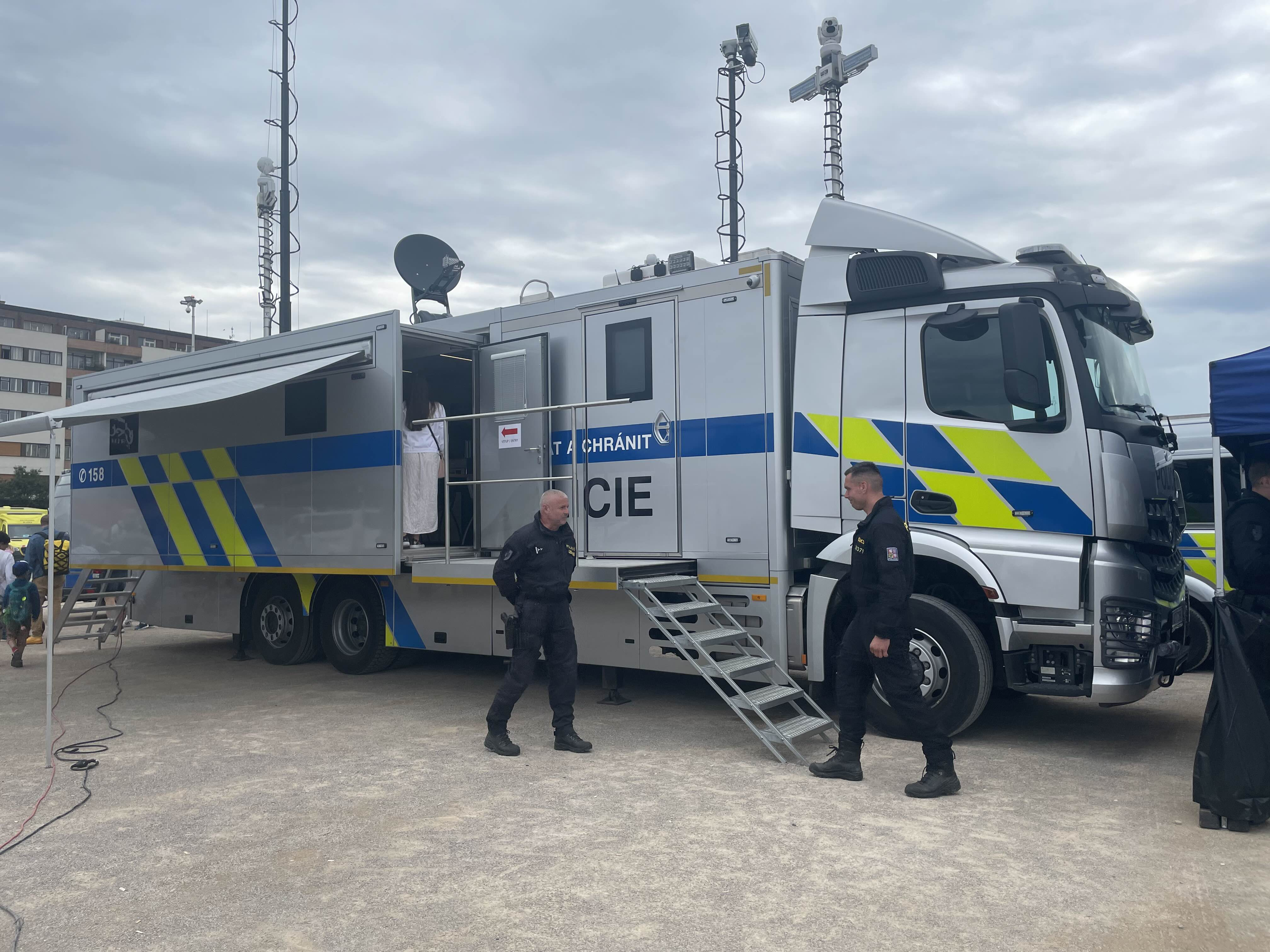
A Czech Police mobile communications vehicle serving as a mobile command center

A mobile communications vehicle (MCV) is a specially-equipped vehicle capable of replacing remote radio communication facilities for mobile communications. An MCV is typically used support public safety communication needs during scheduled or emergency events. The vehicle may carry equipment to operate UHF and VHF frequencies. An MCV can be driven to a location to fill in radio coverage gaps or to replace a damaged radio communications tower. Once deployed the MCV operates unmanned.

== Equipment ==
Many MCVs are equipped with:

- Diesel generators
- Telephone connectivity
- Satellite navigation
- Satellite uplinks
- Radio transmitters and receivers

== See also ==
- Emergency Communications Response Vehicle
- Emergency operations center
- Outside broadcasting
- Satellite truck
