= General Dynamics Ajax =

Family of British armoured fighting vehicles

Ajax
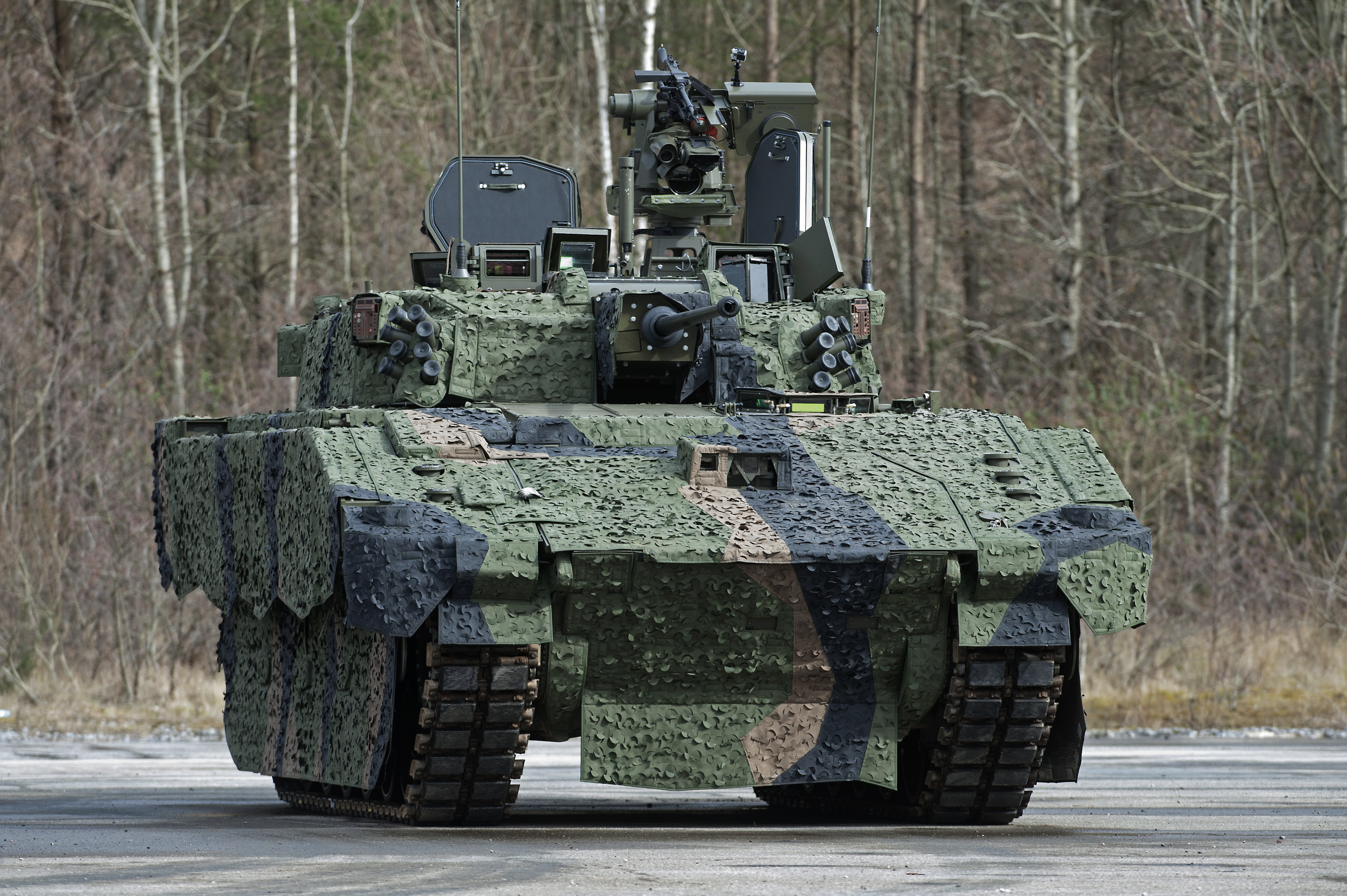
- Pre-production prototype of the turreted Ajax variant
- Type: Armoured fighting vehicle
- Place of origin: United Kingdom

Production history
- Designer: General Dynamics UK
- Manufacturer: General Dynamics UK
- Developed from: ASCOD 2

Specifications
- Mass: 38 tonnes with growth potential to 42 tonnes
- Length: 7.62 m (25 ft 0 in)
- Width: 3.35 m (11 ft 0 in)
- Height: 3.00 m (9 ft 10 in)
- Crew: 3 crew for Ajax variant 2 crew+7 passengers for Ares variant
- Main armament: 40 mm (1.6 in) CTA International CTAS40 cannon
- Secondary armament: 7.62 mm L94A1 coaxial chain gun Kongsberg Protector Remote Weapon Station (UK testing with 7.62 mm L7 General-purpose machine gun and Javelin ATGM)
- Engine: MTU Friedrichshafen V8 engine 600 kW (800 bhp)
- Transmission: RENK 6 speed HSWL 256B
- Suspension: Torsion bar
- Maximum speed: 70 km/h (43 mph)

The Ajax, formerly known as the Scout SV (Specialist Vehicle), is a group of armoured fighting vehicles developed by General Dynamics UK for the British Army. It has suffered serious development and production difficulties, but finally began to enter service in 2025. As of November 2025, Ajax's entry into service has been halted as a result of numerous cases of soldiers falling ill while using the vehicle.

The Ajax is a development of the ASCOD 2 armoured fighting vehicles used by the Spanish Armed Forces and Austrian Armed Forces. The vehicles were originally developed by Steyr-Daimler-Puch Spezialfahrzeug and Santa Bárbara Sistemas in the early 1990s. Both companies were purchased by General Dynamics in the early 2000s. In 2010, General Dynamics UK was selected as the winner of the Future Rapid Effect System contract with the ASCOD 2 Common Base Platform, beating BAE Systems' CV90 proposal. The Ajax vehicles are to be procured in a number of variants, initially planned to be in blocks, with the first vehicles initially planned to be delivered in 2017. Countless delays meant that as of January 2020, initial operating capability was expected in July 2020. Trials were halted over excessive noise and vibration in November 2020. Limited trials subsequently resumed in October 2022.

Deliveries of production Ajax vehicles to frontline British Army units began in January 2025, some eight years behind the original schedule, with the first unit of vehicles achieving operational status in November of that year. Full operating capability is expected between October 2028 and September 2029, when the delivery and conversion training has been completed. However, in December 2025, training with the vehicle was suspended pending further investigations, after reports of illness amongst crews participating in an exercise.

The British Army resumed Ajax armoured vehicle trials as of April 2026.

== Development ==
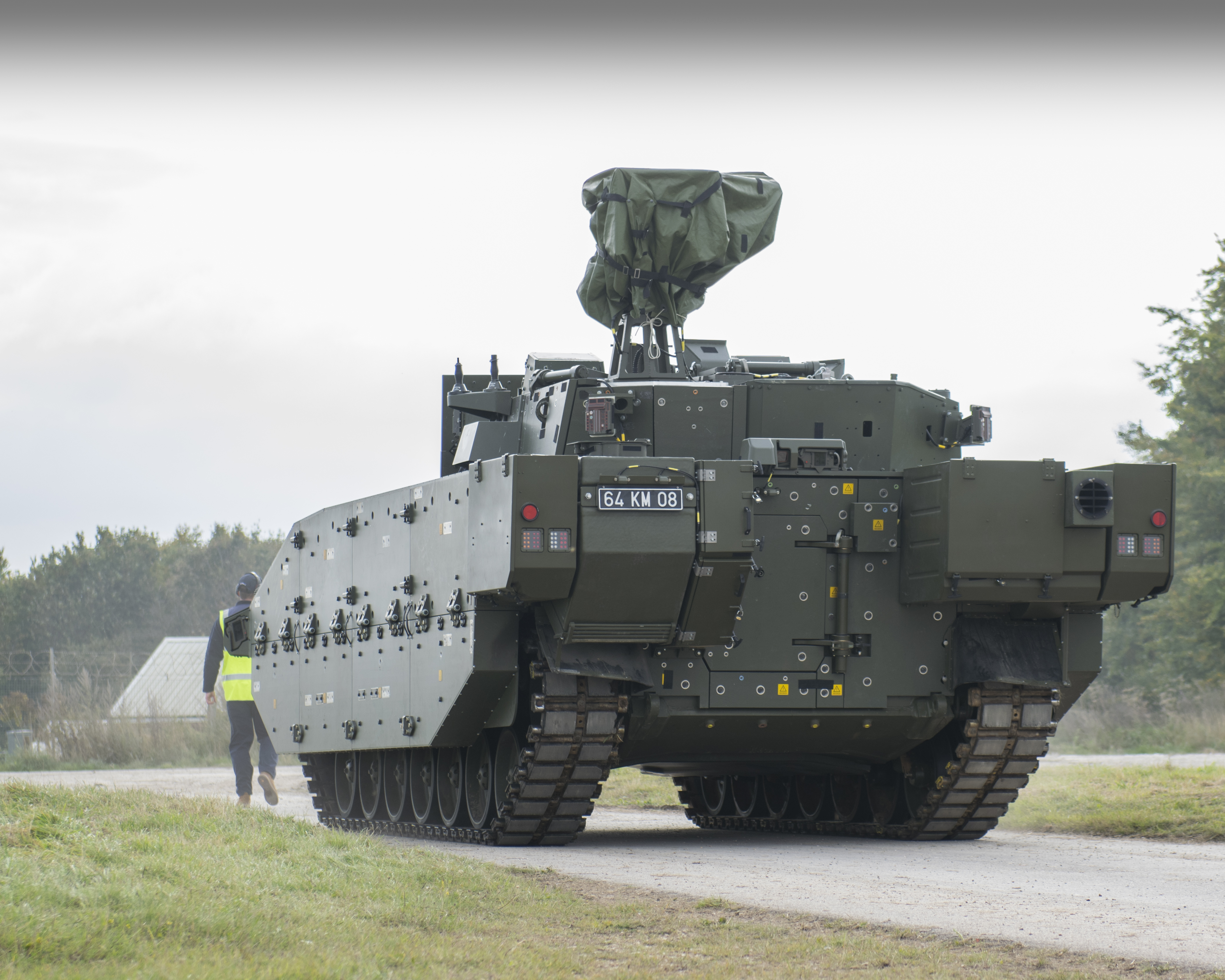
Rear view of Ajax variant in October 2016

The Ajax has its origins in the Future Rapid Effect System programme going back to the 1990s when the joint UK/USA TRACER programme was cancelled. The purpose of the FRES programme was to find a replacement for the British Army's Combat Vehicle Reconnaissance (Tracked) (CVR(T)) family of vehicles, which have been in service from 1971. As other armies had already done the British Army was replacing its Armoured Fighting Vehicles (AFVs) with Infantry Fighting Vehicles (IFVs). General Dynamics UK won the contract in March 2010 after years of competition from BAE Systems. After the Ministry of Defence had selected the ASCOD 2 Common Base Platform, BAE tried to reverse the decision by offering to manufacture the CV90 at their Newcastle facility. Nevertheless, the Ministry of Defence awarded General Dynamics a £500 million Demonstration Phase contract. General Dynamics has conducted design review work using the input of soldiers and bringing the ASCOD 2 Chassis in line with the British requirements.

The Ajax programme passed the "Preliminary Design Review" (PDR) initial design point in December 2012. At this stage of development, system maturity and preliminary system design were reviewed. In late 2013, the "Common Base Platform Critical Design Review" (CDR) was completed and development continued. In June 2014, the Protected Mobility Reconnaissance Support (PMRS) variant of the Scout Family officially completed its CDR. A "Mobile Test Rig", the precursor to a prototype, which had been undergoing rigorous testing including cold weather and Operational and Tactical (O&T) mobility trials, as well as Accelerated Life Testing (ALT), completed system de-risking. At the DVD exhibition in 2014, the first pre-production prototype of the PMRS variant was unveiled, built at General Dynamics' facilities in Spain.

Initially, the Ajax was to be procured in a number of blocks totalling 1,010 vehicles. The first order of Block 1 vehicles encompassed Scout Reconnaissance, PMRS APC, and Repair and Recovery variants, with a following order of Block 2 to consist of Reconnaissance, C2, and Ambulance variants. There was a possibility for a third Block of vehicles encompassing a "Direct Fire" vehicle with a 120mm main gun, "Manoeuvre Support", and a "Joint Fires" variant equipped to succeed the FV102 Striker in the anti-tank role. However, in September 2014, Block 3 vehicles were dropped and the Ministry of Defence had "no plans" to order any Block 2 vehicles.

On 3 September 2014, the British Government ordered 589 Scout SV vehicles, totalling a cost of £3.5 billion excluding VAT. A number of Block 2 variants were merged into the Block 1 order.

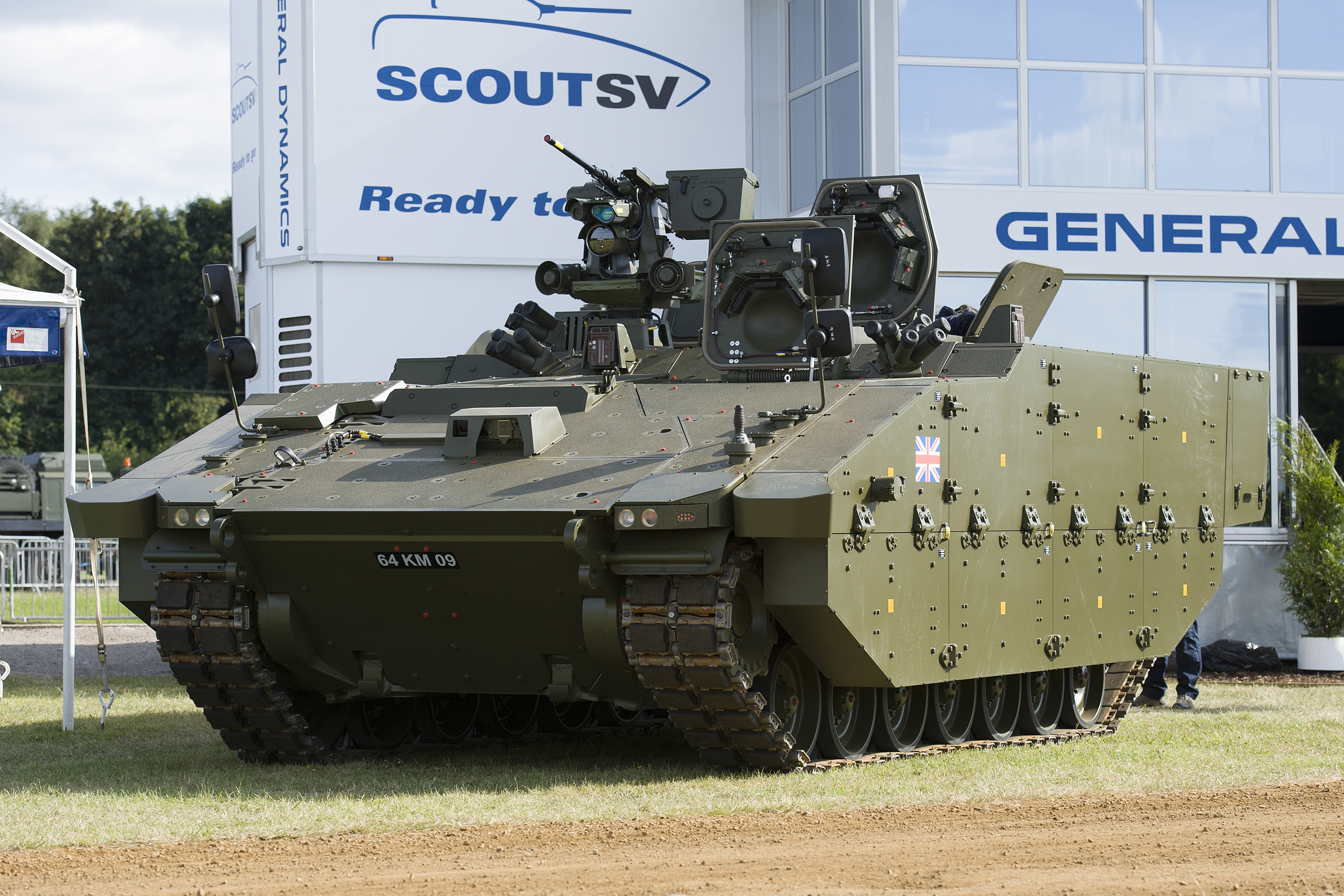
Pre-production prototype of the Ares (PMRS variant)

The variants ordered include:

- 245 turreted 'Ajax' variants
  - 198 Reconnaissance and Strike (Ajax)
  - 23 Joint Fire Control (Ajax)
  - 24 Ground Based Surveillance (Ajax)
- 256 Protected Mobility Recce Support (PMRS) variants
  - 93 Armoured Personnel Carrier (APC) (Ares)
  - 112 Command and Control (Athena)
  - 34 Formation Reconnaissance Overwatch (Ares)
  - 51 Engineer Reconnaissance (Argus)
- 88 Engineering variants for REME based on the PMRS
  - 38 armoured recovery vehicles (Atlas) with three man crew
  - 50 Repair vehicles (Apollo) with four man crew

Deliveries to the British Army began in 2017; the last deliveries were scheduled for around 2026.

In July 2015, the Ministry of Defence concluded their study into having final assembly of the Scout SV vehicles take place in the UK rather than General Dynamics' primary production facility in Spain. There was a business case for UK final assembly and testing. As part of a £390 million maintenance package running until 2024, General Dynamics moved production of the last 489 vehicles to the UK. General Dynamics bought a former forklift factory in Pentrebach in South Wales to assemble the Scout SV. Thales UK won the sight system contract for the Scout family, safeguarding engineering and manufacturing jobs at their site in Scotland.

In early August 2015, Rheinmetall of Germany was contracted to manufacture the Scout SV turrets. Meggitt was to manufacture the Scout SV ammunition handling system.

On 15 September 2015, Scout was renamed Ajax. The name Ajax applies to the family as a whole, but also to the turreted variant specifically. The reconnaissance support variant was named Ares after the Greek god of war; the command-and-control variant was named after Athena; the equipment repair vehicle was named Apollo; the equipment recovery variant was named Atlas; and the engineering reconnaissance variant was named Argus.

In April 2016, the main cannon and chain gun were fired successfully. In December 2016 manned firing tests of the three machine guns which can be fitted to the Ares vehicle were successfully carried out.

== Design ==
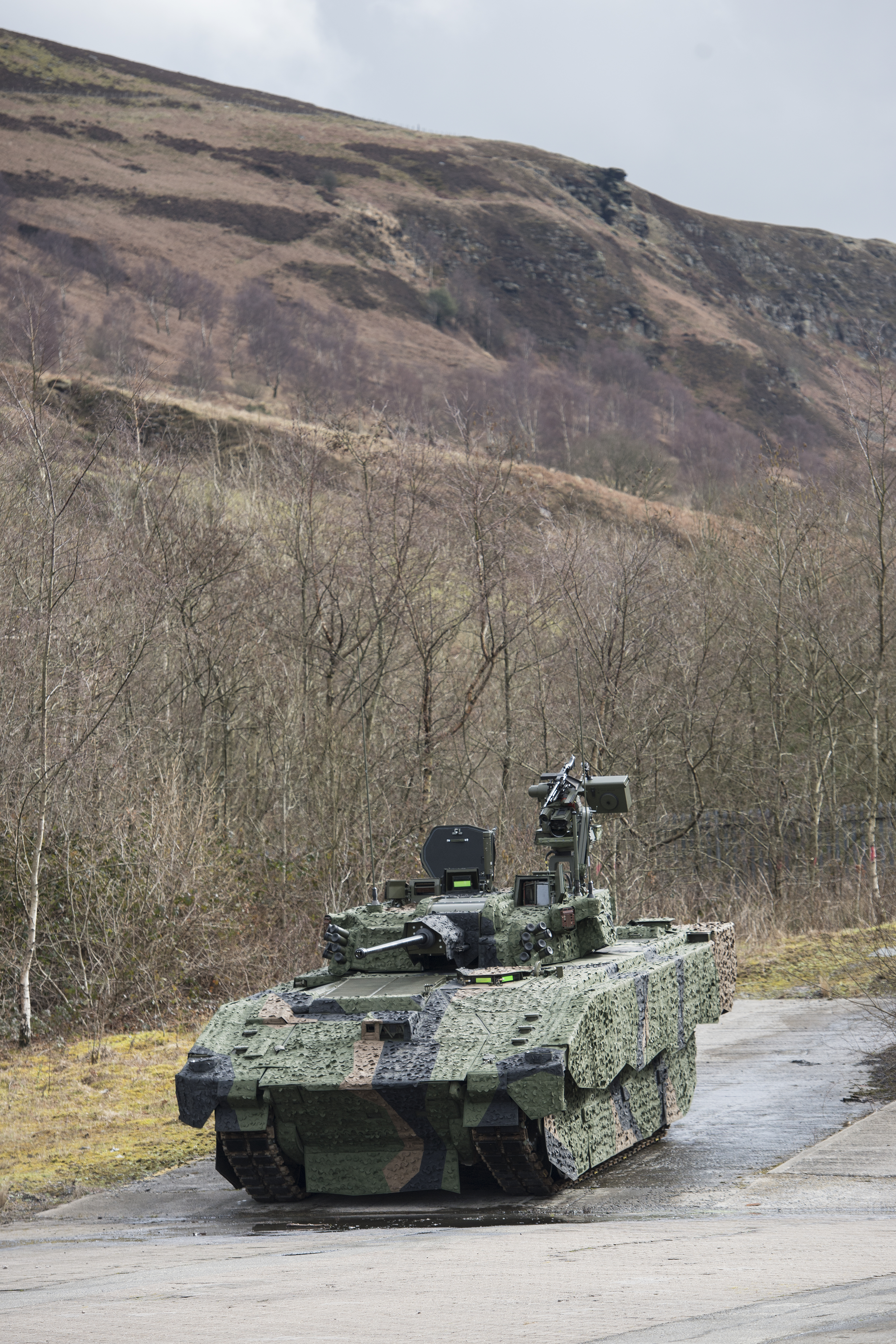
Ajax prototype in March 2016

The Ajax is manufactured and designed by General Dynamics UK and General Dynamics Santa Bárbara Sistemas (Spain), with the new turret and fire control system fitted on the Reconnaissance variant being designed and manufactured by Lockheed Martin UK. Lockheed Martin is working closely with the Defence Support Group for turret manufacture and assembly as well as Rheinmetall. 75% of turret and cannon work will be carried out in the UK.

The turret ring is 1.7 m (5 ft 7 in) in diameter, allowing for much more work-space than comparable AFVs. The Scout SV is also equipped with a state of the art Intelligence, surveillance, target acquisition, and reconnaissance (ISTAR) package with advanced sensors and space for further future growth. This advanced ISTAR package allows for automated search, tracking and detection, more than doubling stand-off range at which targets can be identified and tracked.

The main armament for the Ajax variants is the innovative Anglo-French 40CT cannon which uses 40 mm telescoped ammunition with the warhead seated inside the propellant casing; the smaller size enables a much greater ammunition load. A linkless carousel magazine allows the crew to quickly change ammunition type, which includes high explosive with an impact fuze or timed for airburst, and solid shot or tungsten dart kinetic energy rounds, capable of penetrating 14 cm of armour at up to 1,500 metres. The rate of fire is 200 rounds per minute (RPM), compared to 90 RPM for the RARDEN gun which it replaces. The barrel can be elevated to 80°, allowing it to engage helicopters or unmanned aerial vehicles.

The Ajax has a 20 Gbit/s Ethernet intelligent open architecture, which enables it to capture, process and store six TBs of information gathered by the sensors. It can then share this data, be it images or other information, via a real-time integrated Bowman communication system as fitted to the Challenger 2. Power for these systems comes from a silent auxiliary power generator.

Eighty per cent of the vehicle manufacture will be completed in the UK, with 70% of the supply chain companies UK-based. The Ajax family project supports 400 jobs at General Dynamics UK's two facilities at Merthyr Tydfil and Oakdale in South Wales, and an estimated further 4,000 jobs in the British supply chain.

== Project progress ==
=== Before 2021 ===
Ordered in 2014, the first delivery was scheduled for 2017, while it was stated that the first British Army squadron "will be equipped by mid-2019" so that they could be deployed by the end of 2020. This was delayed due to design and testing problems. Test crews were required to wear noise cancelling headphones and be checked for hearing loss at the end of operations and the vehicles were unable to reverse over obstacles more than 20 centimetres high.

=== 2021 ===
As of March 2021, the British Army had taken deliveries of the Ares variant, whilst 12 Ajax variants were going through acceptance testing. In June 2021 it was revealed that trials of Ajax variants were halted from November 2020 to March 2021 due to excessive vibration and noise, leaving crews suffering from nausea, swollen joints and tinnitus. Test crews were then limited to 105 minutes inside and 20 miles per hour (32 km/h). The excessive vibration while moving was also damaging electronic systems and preventing armament from stabilising. Suspension faults on the Ajax variant meant that its turret could not fire while moving. The hulls were of inconsistent lengths and had non-parallel sides, which meant that the vibration problems did not manifest in a uniform manner, making it exceedingly difficult to determine if the vibration arose from a fundamental design problem or from build quality failures. A leaked report doubted whether the Ajax Armoured Vehicle programme would be delivered on time and within budget and suggested that there was a risk that the vehicles' credibility would be questioned by troops and morale impaired. General Dynamics UK refused to comment on the report.

In early 2021, MPs on the Defence Select Committee issued a report critical of the state of the Army's armoured vehicle programme—including Ajax—which had spent hundreds of millions of pounds with little to show for it. Some defence experts questioned whether Ajax would ever enter service, calling it "the Army's Nimrod MRA4" (an upgrade of which never entered service and was scrapped in 2010 at a cost of £3.8bn). The Times reported that in June 2021 the problems with noise and rough handling were so serious that trials involving the Ajax had been suspended. The paper quoted Francis Tusa, editor of Defence Analysis, concluding that the British Army "are spending good money after bad for something that is arguably unfixable." On 20 July 2021, Minister for Defence Procurement Jeremy Quin told the Defence Select Committee that "we cannot be 100 per cent certain that [the salvation of the programme] can be achieved." On 15 December 2021, Quin updated the Parliament and stated that "We are commissioning a senior legal figure to look more deeply at Ajax, and not just health and safety; to examine the cultural and process flaws that it has highlighted. We will leave no stone unturned to learn these lessons." Quin also listed four key points for the review to consider, relating to safety concerns by MoD officials that were communicated to the manufacturer.

=== 2022 ===
In June 2022, a report by the UK Parliament's Public Accounts Committee found that delays had been caused by a "litany of failures" and advised that the Ministry of Defence needed to either resolve the problems or scrap the project, to prevent the compromising of national security.

Limited User Validation Trials recommenced in October 2022, with a view to commencing Reliability Growth Trials in January 2023. On 21 December 2022, the Minister of State for the Ministry of Defence, Alex Chalk, stated that these trials could last from 18 to 24 months—a period which would mean that the results of the trials would not be available until after the next UK general election. Trials eventually included vehicles being tested over 42,000 kilometres (26,000 mi) of varying terrains, and the firing of 20,000 rounds from the 40 mm main armament.

=== 2023 ===
On 24 February 2023, Defence Secretary Ben Wallace described the programme as having "turned a corner" and being "back on track." In March 2023, the MOD said that it had resumed payments to General Dynamics Land Systems UK (GDLS-UK), having halted them more than two years previously. The project has cost around £5.5bn so far, although according to the MOD "the whole programme remains within its originally approved budget level."

=== 2025: Initial Operating Capability (IOC) achieved ===
In January 2025, deliveries of Ajax vehicles commenced to three British Army units; the Combat Manoeuvre Centre at Bovington Camp, the Queen's Royal Hussars at Tidworth Camp, and the Royal Lancers at Catterick Garrison. In November 2025, the Ministry of Defence declared that "initial operating capability" (IOC) had been achieved, and that a squadron of 27 Ajax vehicles of the Household Cavalry Regiment was available for deployment.

=== 2025 ===
On 26th November 2025, it was reported in the British media that the Army had halted the use of Ajax vehicles "after soldiers left vomiting". According to reports, around 30 soldiers became ill during training with the vehicles. An MoD spokesman said "This weekend, a small number of soldiers reported symptoms of noise and vibration, having taken part in an exercise involving the Ajax armoured fighting vehicle. Out of an abundance of caution, the minister for defence readiness and industry has asked the Army to pause all use of Ajax for training and exercising for two weeks, while a safety investigation is carried out into the events this weekend."

In December 2025, Armed Forces Minister Al Carns told Parliament that the Ajax programme had overspent, before correcting the record days later to clarify that its requirements had instead been over-specified.

All trials of the Ajax armoured vehicles were paused after another soldier fell ill while riding the vehicle on 12th December. The vehicle involved in the incident was undergoing "reliability growth trials" in order to provide data for the safety investigations. This was after training and exercising of the vehicle was halted and 23 units were suspended from operations in November. These vehicles have already undergone "45-point inspections" followed by further assessment on 13 of them. The same for remaining 10 are expected to be completed. Thereafter, the results will be reported to the defence minister in the New Year who will also decide whether or when the trials should resume. Both an army investigation and a defence accident investigation branch inquiry is underway. The vehicle in the 12th December incident was not one of the 23 vehicles.

=== 2026: Initial Operating Capability (IOC) withdrawn ===
Initial Operating Capability (IOC) status was withdrawn in January 2026, after thirty soldiers reported illness while using the vehicle during an exercise.

=== 2026 ===
In April 2026, it was announced that trials would be restarted "cautiously", and in June it was announced that improvements would be made to Ajax "within months".

On 16 July 2026, during an oral evidence session of a UK House of Commons Public Accounts Committee, Rupert Pearce, National Armaments Director at the UK Ministry of Defence, stated that changes aimed at addressing previous issues with Ajax were being made under Capability Drop 4. These changes included the addition of an automatic track tensioning system, to ensure that tracks are kept at the correct tension without the crew needing to manually adjust it. Additionally, Pearce stated that the UK Ministry of Defence would be running trials exploring the use of composite rubber tracks (CRTs) for Ajax.

== Variants ==
- AJAX reconnaissance vehicle
- APOLLO armoured repair vehicle
- ARES armoured personnel carrier
- ARGUS engineering vehicle
- ATHENA command post vehicle
- ATLAS armoured recovery vehicle

== Operators ==
=== Current operators ===
United Kingdom (589)
227 of the Ajax family have entered service as of 15 September 2026 from an order of:
- 245 Ajax
- 50 Apollo
- 93 Ares
- 51 Argus
- 112 Athena
- 38 Atlas

=== Failed bids ===
Poland (700)
GDLS UK offered the Ajax, the ARES chassis base, to fulfil the need for a heavy IFV for the Polish Army. It would have been equipped with the ZSSW-30 remote controlled turret. The Polish Army is looking for a heavy IFV (CBWP) for its Abrams tank brigades. The other vehicles in competition included the GDELS ASCOD 2, the Rheinmetall KF41 Lynx, the BAE Systems AMPV, the Otokar Tulpar and the AS21 Redback. Up to 700 vehicles are planned under the CBWP programme. Ultimately, no decision was made to purchase the Ajax instead, the domestic CBWP Ratel project was chosen.

== See also ==
- ASCOD – (Spain, Austria)
- Borsuk IFV – (Poland)
- Namer – (Israel)
- Tulpar IFV – (Turkey)
- Bionix AFV – (Singapore)
- Hunter AFV – (Singapore)
- BMP-3 – (Soviet Union, Russia)
- Kurganets-25 – (Russia)
- T-15 Armata – (Russia)
- CV-90 – (Sweden)
- Dardo IFV – (Italy)
- K21 – (South Korea)
- M2 Bradley – (United States)
- Puma (IFV) – (Germany)
- Type 89 – (Japan)
- Makran IFV – (Iran)
- KF-41 Lynx – (Germany)
- Vikram VT21 – (India)
- Household Cavalry Regiment
- Formation reconnaissance regiment
- 3rd (UK) Division
