= Personal Role Radio =

British UHF transmitter-receiver

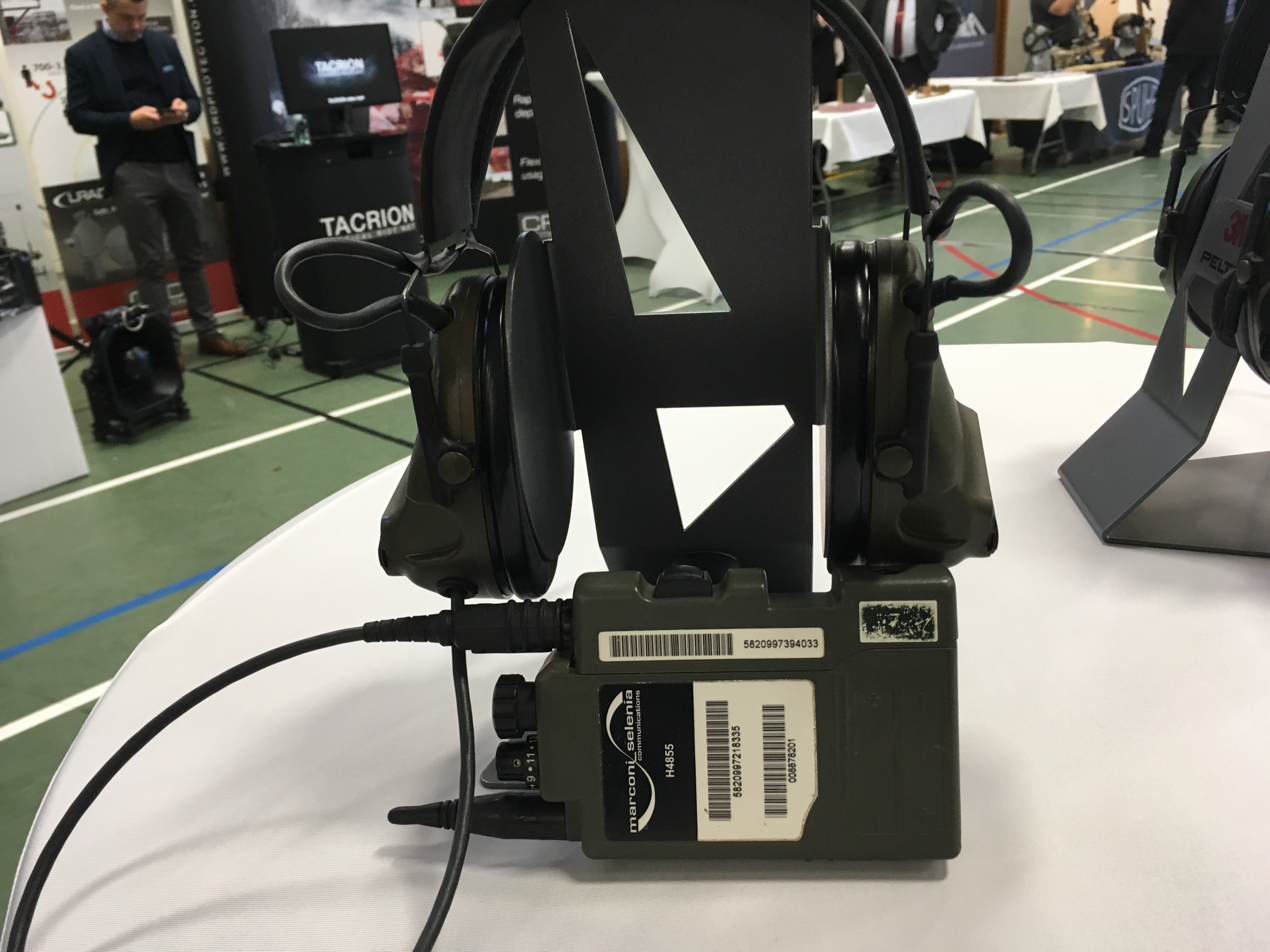
H4855 Personal Role Radio

The H4855 Personal Role Radio (PRR) is a small short-range half-duplex UHF transmitter/receiver in service with the British Army, Royal Marines, Royal Navy, Royal Air Force Regiment and US Marine Corps. The radio has a range of 500 m (1,600 ft), weighs 1.5 kg (3.3 lb) providing direct tactical soldier-to-soldier communication. Operating in the 2.4 GHz (12 cm) band, PRR has 256 different radio channels and a battery life of 20 hours continuous use. Effective through thick cover or the walls of buildings, PRR is issued to every member of an eight-strong infantry section.

The PRR is also referred as AN/PRC-343 and as Integrated Intra-Squad Radio (IISR) in US military usage. In accordance with the Joint Electronics Type Designation System (JETDS), the "AN/PRC-343" designation represents the 343rd design of an Army-Navy electronic device for portable two-way communications radio. The JETDS system is also now used to name all Department of Defense, NATO, and others' electronic systems.

== History ==
Selex ES developed the H4855 PRR in 1999 and introduced it for worldwide military use in 2002. It is now manufactured by Leonardo S.p.A.. The PRR was originally part of the wider Bowman radio project but was separated from Bowman in October 1999 for faster implementation. The first of 45,000 units formally entered service in early 2002.

The PRR was replaced by the H-174-4855-ELSA Enhanced Encrypted Personal Role Radio or EZPRR in 2005, also developed by Selex.

== Features ==
Additional features include the ability for re-configuring in the field with 16 channels available on a selector knob. Fifteen other groups of 16 channels are also available. The radio operates using a spread spectrum and has transmission security being designed with low probability of intercept (LPI)/low probability of detection (LPD).

An inbuilt receiver enables the radio to be keyed remotely via a short range encoded Push-to-talk (PTT) switch fob, the switch being mounted on a weapon or hand grip of a military vehicle. The switch code can be changed in the field and the radio configured to work with up to 4 different switches (useful for soldiers sharing transport such as motor cycles where the PTT switch can be handlebar mounted).

The side-mounted switch-pack has a single transmit switch for general use. It also has a double switch pack and auxiliary lead and connector to operate a second radio from the same users headset. Multiple security switches and block outs are fitted to prevent re-transmission of secure Bowman signals over the personal network. The switch unit is secured with a single screw, the slotted head being wide enough to accept the tang of the standard screwdriver tool supplied with the SA80 rifle. Removing the switch assembly also gains access to the 16 group selector switch allowing the radio to reconfigured in a to a different group of channels.

The PRR uses a dedicated headset; no inbuilt speaker or microphone are included in the radio. The single ear piece has attached a 51 cm (20 in) cord connecting the radio and the mike on a flexible boom. The headset design is a ventilated plate with a waterproof earpiece mounted on a frame. The design is such that normal conversation and surrounding sounds are not blocked from the user, a soft ear pad rests against the user and an open mesh headband with straps secures it. The design allows the headset to be worn with very little strap pressure for long periods. The plate has a flat external surface and can be used with a standard ear muff type hearing protector over the top; this requirement being for training and range practice use when not in combat. The microphone is a noise cancelling electret type housed in a black glass filled nylon case made from a type of nylon that will crystallise at flash temperatures giving it a good chance of survival .

== Specifications ==
- Frequency coverage: 2.4–2.483 GHz (12.49–12.07 cm) using 256 channels in 16 channel groups
- Output power: 50 mW
- Range: 500 m (1,600 ft) in open terrain
- RF modulation: Quadrature Phase-Shift Keying (QPSK) Direct-Sequence Spread Spectrum (DSSS)
- Voice modulation: Continuously Variable Slope Delta CVSD
- Data protocol: Modified IEEE 802.11 (Note: Institute of Electrical and Electronics Engineers (IEEE) LAN/MAN Standards Committee (IEEE 802) standard.)
- Weight: 1.5 kg (3.3 lb)
- Power supply: 2 AA batteries, 20 hours continuous use

== See also ==
- List of military electronics of the United States
