= Emergency Communications Response Vehicle =

Red Cross emergency vehicle

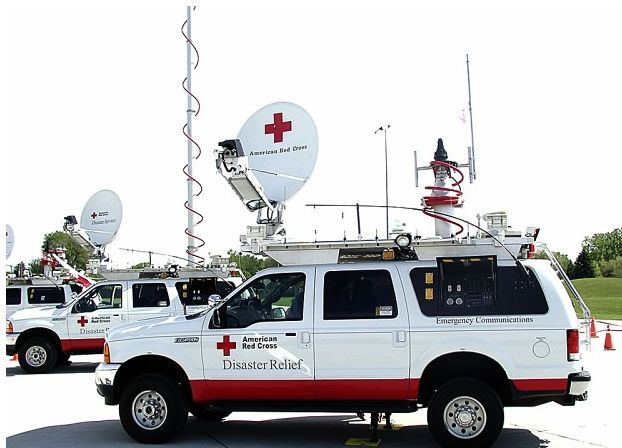

The ECRV, or Emergency Communications Response Vehicle, was designed and created for the American Red Cross by Disaster Services Communications paid and volunteer staff, to provide communications links between disaster relief operations and the Disaster Operation Center. However, as of February 21, 2013, the ECRV has been phased out in favor of more portable and flexible systems. Before replacement, they included an interoperability switch which allows the Red Cross to communicate with the variety of communication systems based in the nationwide network of chapters.

The nine base vehicles for the original design, 2000 Ford Excursions, were donated by Ford Motor Company; subsystems and components were primarily acquired through funding via the Disaster Technology Integration Program (DSTIP). The vehicles were extensively modified to add an 8.5KW alternator driven by the engine (keeping weight down, thereby avoiding significant safety hazards), a 52' pop-up pneumatic mast capable of rotating while holding a large yagi antenna, a KU VSAT satellite antenna system, and sixteen HF, VHF, and UHF antennas feeding its radios and interoperable voice and data systems. The Chevrolet Suburban model was the basis of three vehicles delivered in October 2007; this version does not have the pneumatic mast.

The operator training course involved approximately 40 hours of classroom and hands-on instruction with the ECRV's various onboard systems, safety training that included driving an obstacle course, and coverage of mast and RF safety issues. Course prerequisites included a current defensive driving certificate, a clean DMV record, current First Aid and CPR certifications, and enrollment in the Disaster Services Human Resources system of the American Red Cross. Operators were called on as needed to drive the vehicles to and from disaster locations and operate the systems until communications could be otherwise restored.

Until their decommissioning in 2013, they were used in every significant relief operation from 2001-2012, including (9/11, Hurricane Katrina, the 2004 Atlantic hurricane season, and the October 2007 California wildfires to name a few.
