= General Dynamics UK =

British subsidiary of the defence and security company General Dynamics

General Dynamics UK Limited
- Company type: Subsidiary
- Industry: Defence
- Founded: 1962; 63 years ago
- Headquarters: Oakdale, Caerphilly, United Kingdom
- Products: Ajax, Ocelot, Bowman, Evolve to Open (EvO)
- Number of employees: 1,500
- Parent: General Dynamics
- Website: https://generaldynamics.uk.com/

General Dynamics UK is the British subsidiary of the American defence and security corporation General Dynamics. Founded in London in 1962, the company has grown to include eight sites across the United Kingdom, including in Bristol, Chippenham, Hastings, Merthyr Tydfil, Oakdale and Rotherham. Specialising in armoured fighting vehicles, avionic systems and tactical communications, the company has produced the General Dynamics Ajax armoured fighting vehicle, the Ocelot light protected patrol vehicle and the Bowman communications system. It is one of the UK's leading defence companies and a key supplier to the UK Ministry of Defence.

== History ==
The company was originally founded as Computing Devices, part of the General Dynamics Information Systems and Technology group, in 1962.

In 1997, General Dynamics acquired Computing Devices Ltd which had been based in Hastings, East Sussex, since 1974. The company was responsible for supplying avionics to the Tornado GR1, Harrier GR7, Nimrod MR2 and Eurofighter Typhoon. These were praised for their effectiveness during both the Falklands War and Gulf War. More recently, the company provided avionics for the AgustaWestland AW101 Mk3 and Mk4 and AgustaWestland AW159 Wildcat helicopters.

In 2001, Computing Devices Canada (CDC) won a £1.7 billion contract from the UK Ministry of Defence to deliver Bowman, a communications system for the British Armed Forces, beating competing bids from Thales and TRW. The work was carried out at a newly opened UK headquarters in Oakdale, South Wales, and under the new name of General Dynamics UK Limited, having previously been known as CDC Systems UK Limited. The Bowman system was to equip some 20,000 vehicles, 149 naval vessels, 350 aircraft and 100,000 service personnel. It was successfully delivered from March 2004.

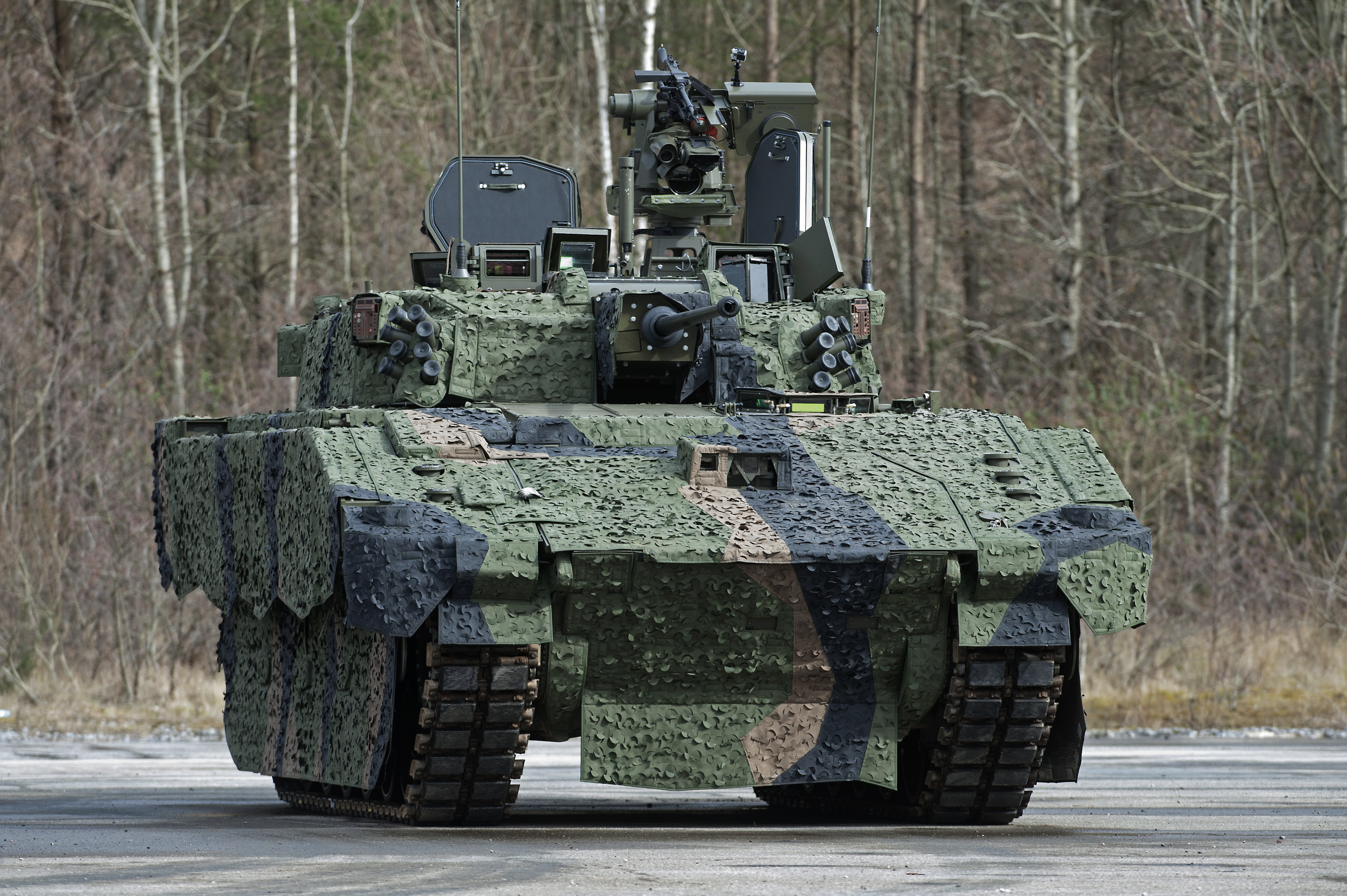
General Dynamics Ajax

In 2010, General Dynamics UK was awarded a contract to supply the British Army with a family of armoured fighting vehicles to meet the requirements of its Future Rapid Effect System (FRES) programme. As prime contractor, the company's bid centered around the General Dynamics Ajax armoured fighting vehicle (previously known as Scout SV), a development of the ASCOD armoured fighting vehicle which was co-developed by another General Dynamics subsidiary, the Spanish-based Santa Bárbara Sistemas. A total of 589 vehicles were to be produced in six variants, including turreted Ajax armoured reconnaissance variants, Ares armoured personnel carrier variants, Athena command and control variants, Argus engineer reconnaissance variants, Atlas recovery variants and Apollo repair variants. Manufacturing and assembly of the first 100 vehicles took place in Spain using steel supplied from Sweden, something the British government argued was not a major loss for British industry as the work for the remaining 489 vehicles was to be carried out in the United Kingdom. Subsequently, in 2016, General Dynamics UK opened an assembly, integration and testing facility for Ajax at a former forklift truck factory in Merthyr Tydfil, Wales, where work on the remaining 489 vehicles was to take place. The first variant of the Ajax family, the Ares, was delivered to the British Army in July 2020.

In 2011, General Dynamics acquired Force Protection Inc and its UK-based subsidiary Force Protection Europe which had developed the Ocelot light protected vehicle, otherwise known as Foxhound in the British Army. General Dynamics UK subsequently oversaw the delivery of Foxhound to the British Army and continues marketing the product.

In 2016, the UK Ministry of Defence awarded an Assessment Phase contract for its Challenger 2 Life Extension Project (LEP) to Team Challenger 2, a consortium of companies led by BAE Systems which included General Dynamics Land Systems - UK. The company's Merthyr Tydfil facility was to be used to bring the Challenger 2 up to Mark 2 standard.

In 2017, General Dynamics UK was awarded a £330 million contract to supply the UK Ministry of Defence with tactical communication and information systems as part of its Morpheus programme.

=== Ajax Procurement ===
Following the awarding of a contract to supply the British Army with armoured fighting vehicles in 2010 as part of its Future Rapid Effect System, there has been a number of failures to deliver the contract as promised. A particular challenge has been the delivery of the Ajax armoured vehicles, with a report by David King, Director Health, Safety and Environmental Protection in the Ministry of Defence finding failings in the handling of health and safety concerns raised during vehicle trials, and also in the acquisition system of the MOD more generally. David King went on to conclude that the vehicles were "not fit for purpose and does not meet the contracted specification". In March 2022, the UK government asked Clive Sheldon KC to conduct a review into the failings and lessons to be learnt from the procurement of the armoured vehicles. The problems found by Clive Sheldon KC were numerous such as problems with: scheduling; technical issues; safety issues; implementation of a huge and complex contract; and the management of contractual disputes. The cost of the procurement is estimated to be £5.5 billion and in January 2023, it was reported that General Dynamics had missed the deadline to file its statement of accounts.

== Overview ==
General Dynamics UK Limited comprises two business units: General Dynamics Land Systems - UK and General Dynamics Mission Systems - UK.

=== Locations ===
General Dynamics UK has eight sites in a total of six locations in the United Kingdom:

- Bristol
- Chippenham
- Hastings (Churchfields and Castleham)
- Merthyr Tydfil
- Oakdale
- Rotherham

=== Products ===
- General Dynamics Ajax
- Ocelot
- Bowman
- Evolve to Open (EvO)
- Avionics for Tornado GR1, Harrier GR7, Nimrod MR2, Eurofighter Typhoon, AgustaWestland AW101 Mk3 and Mk4, AgustaWestland AW159 Wildcat
