= Near-term digital radio =

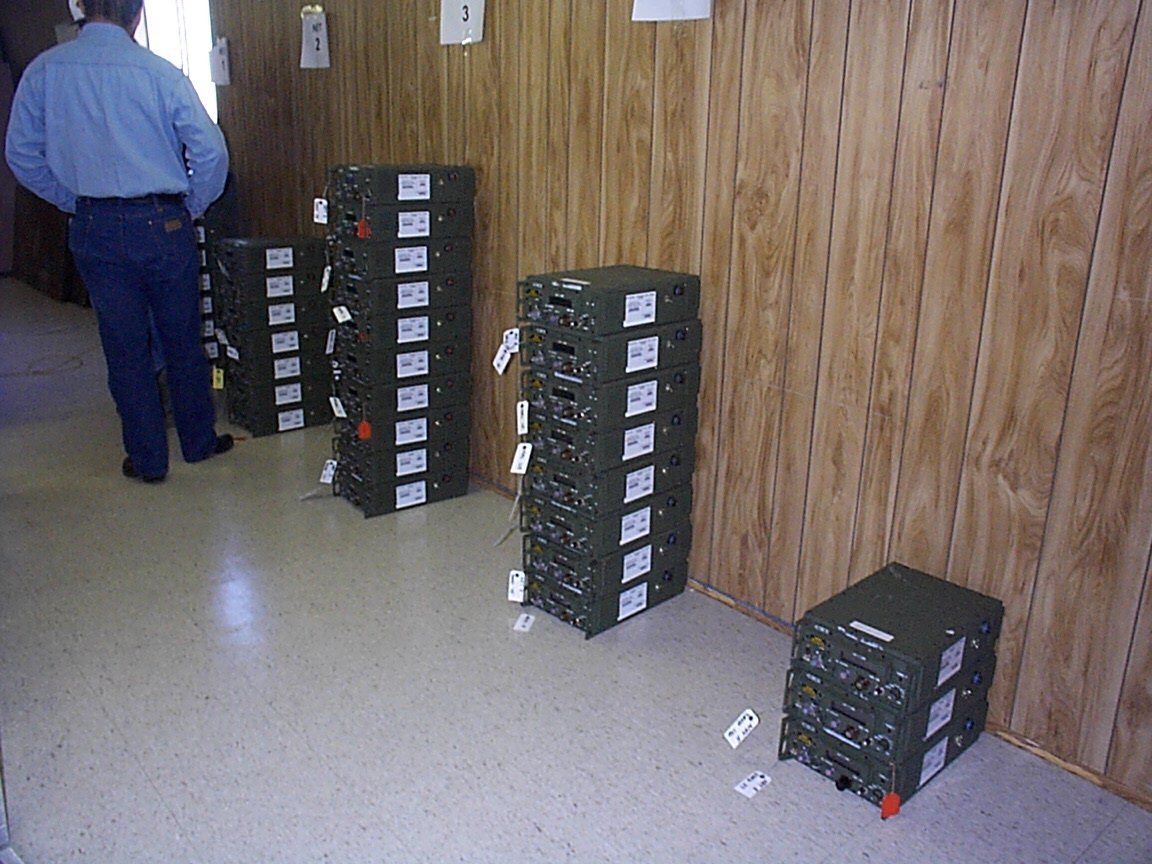
NTDR nodes being prepared for trials, February 1998.

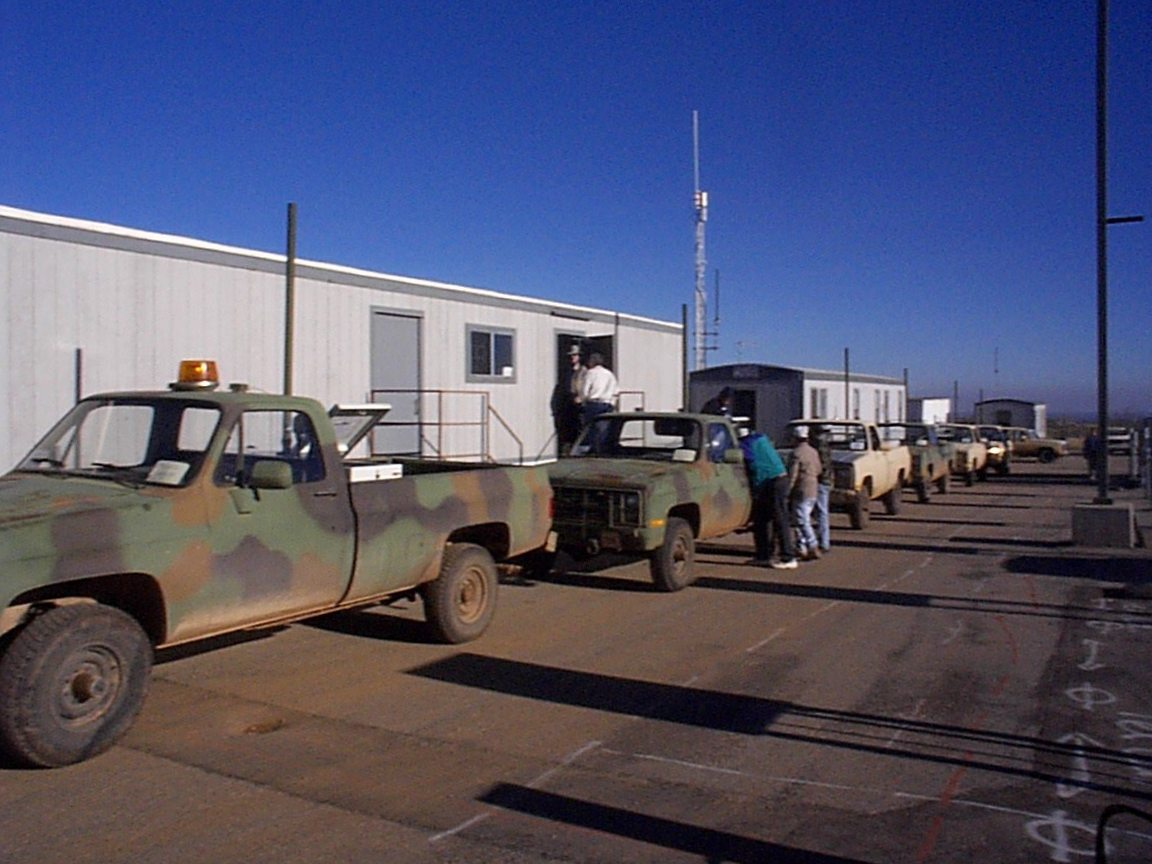
Initial, large-scale trials of the NTDR network, February 1998.

The Near-term digital radio (NTDR) program provided a prototype mobile ad hoc network (MANET) radio system to the United States Army, starting in the 1990s. The MANET protocols were provided by Bolt, Beranek and Newman; the radio hardware was supplied by ITT. These systems have been fielded by the United Kingdom as the High-capacity data radio (HCDR) and by the Israelis as the Israeli data radio. They have also been purchased by a number of other countries for experimentation.

The NTDR protocols consist of two components: clustering and routing. The clustering algorithms dynamically organize a given network into cluster heads and cluster members. The cluster heads create a backbone; the cluster members use the services of this backbone to send and receive packets. The cluster heads use a link-state routing algorithm to maintain the integrity of their backbone and to track the locations of cluster members.

The NTDR routers also use a variant of Open Shortest Path First (OSPF) that is called Radio-OSPF (ROSPF). ROSPF does not use the OSPF hello protocol for link discovery, etc. Instead, OSPF adjacencies are created and destroyed as a function of MANET information that is distributed by the NTDR routers, both cluster heads and cluster members. It also supported multicasting.
