= MOD Abbey Wood =

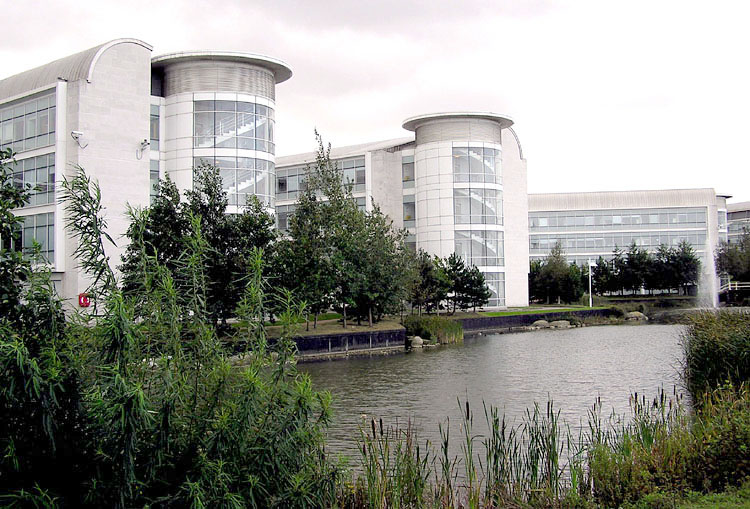
- MOD Abbey Wood

- Location within Bristol

General information
- Status: Completed
- Type: Office complex and conference centre
- Location: Filton, Bristol, United Kingdom
- Coordinates: 51°30′11.88″N 02°33′33.01″W
- Current tenants: Defence Equipment and Support and the Submarine Delivery Agency
- Construction started: Sept 1993
- Opened: July 1996
- Cost: £254 million
- Owner: Ministry of Defence

Design and construction
- Architecture firm: Scott Brownrigg
- Other designers: Fira (Landscape Design)
- Main contractor: Mowlem

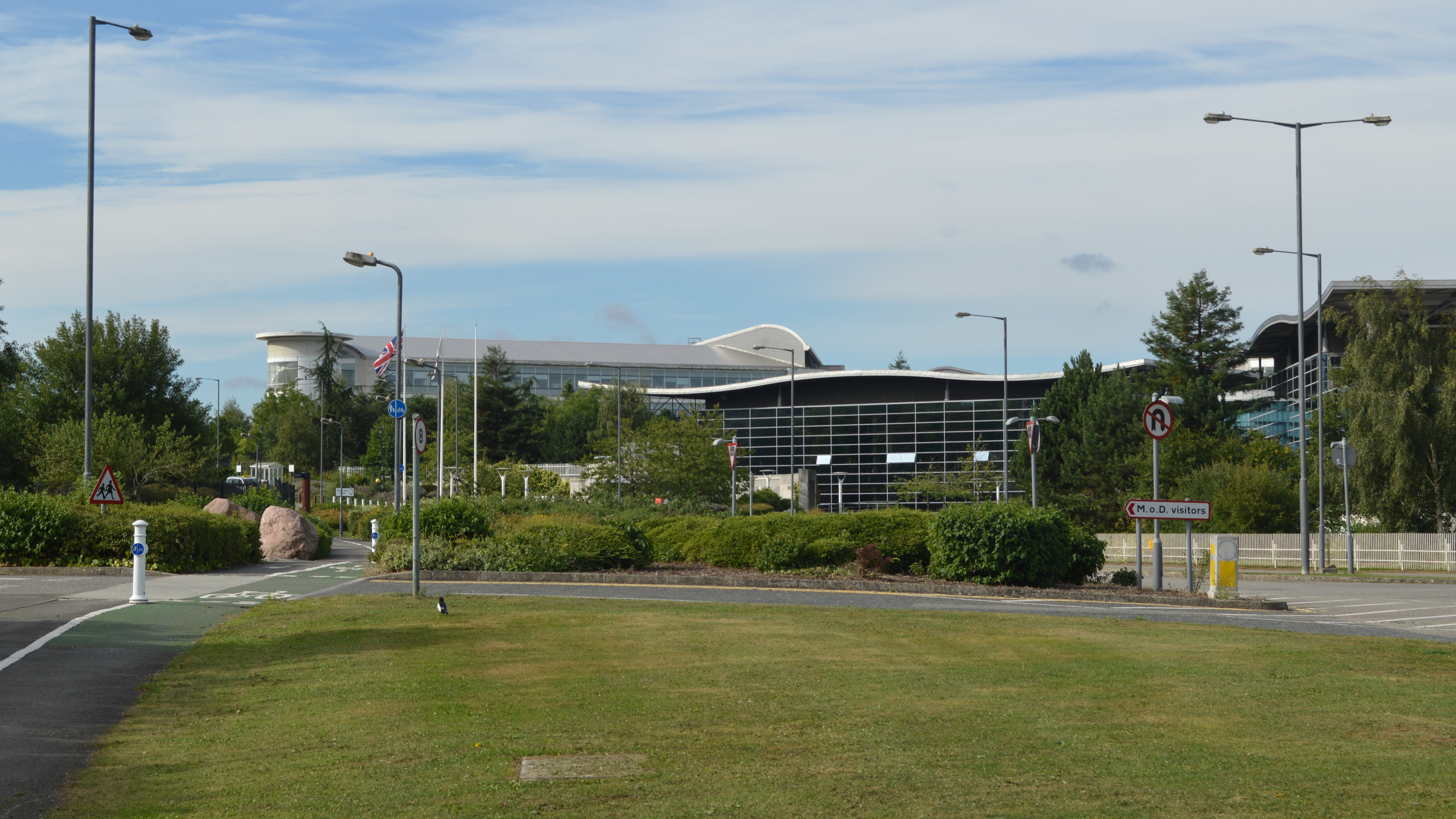
Approach to the visitor entrance

MOD Abbey Wood is a Ministry of Defence establishment at Filton, Bristol, United Kingdom. The purpose-built site houses the MOD's Defence Equipment and Support and Submarine Delivery Agency procurement organisations. It was opened by Queen Elizabeth II in July 1996, after which various government departments relocated to the site.

== History ==
A total of 69 sites were originally considered for the headquarters of the MOD's procurement organisation, with Solihull, Sunderland, Keynsham and South Wales being amongst the other options. Work commenced in September 1993 to build MOD Abbey Wood's offices, restaurants, library, sports facilities, training rooms, auditoria and conference rooms, support facilities and nursery. The site was designed with a feel of connecting "neighbourhoods" and is surrounded by an artificial lake for security.

Abbey Wood was formally opened by Queen Elizabeth II in July 1996. The campus cost £254 million to build, and has been described as "the most progressive public sector office complex built in Britain for a generation". The site won the 1997 RICS Energy Efficiency award for the ecological design of the building, however, its environmental friendliness was later questioned, as many employees travelled to the site by car even though it is adjacent to the Filton Abbey Wood railway station.

The entire site is 40 hectares (99 acres) - the equivalent of 50 football pitches - and has a perimeter of 3 km (1.9 mi).

After Abbey Wood opened, the MOD Procurement Executive departments from across the UK, mainly London and Bath, relocated to the new facility. Subsequently, further consolidation to the site has occurred. The relocation of departments, bringing together 15 offices and 4,400 staff, was the largest ever attempted by a British government department. The site manages procurement contracts for the Royal Navy, the British Army and the Royal Air Force. Abbey Wood is the largest MOD site in the UK; about 5,500 people worked at the site when it opened, rising to 8,500 prior to the 2020 COVID-19 pandemic.
