= General Dynamics European Land Systems =

Automotive and arms manufacturer

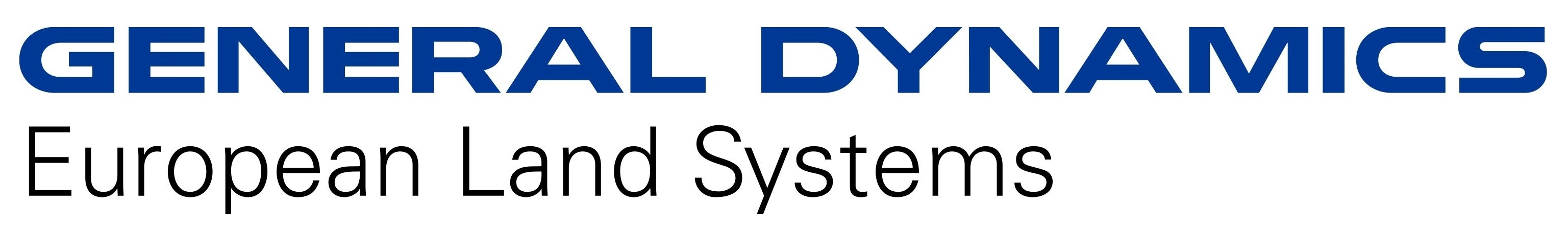
- Industry: Defence
- Predecessor: EWK; FWW Fahrzeugwerk GmbH; Mowag AG; Santa Bárbara Sistemas SA; Steyr-Daimler-Puch (military vehicle unit)
- Founded: 2003; 23 years ago
- Headquarters: Madrid, Spain
- Number of locations: 9 (as of 2022)
- Area served: Worldwide
- Key people: Antonio Bueno (CEO)
- Products: Military Military vehicles, bridging systems, artillery, missiles, small arms, turrets, ammunition, maintenance & services Civilian Driveline, Aeronautics, thermal and surface components
- Number of employees: ▲2,400 (2023)
- Parent: General Dynamics
- Website: Official website

General Dynamics European Land Systems (GDELS) is an automotive and arms manufacturer spread across Europe, with a headquarter in Madrid, Spain. It is a business unit of General Dynamics which consolidated in one structure all European subsidiaries of GDLS.

== History ==
At the beginning of the years 2000, General Dynamics acquired major European defence companies, and consolidated the activities and expanded the collaborations.

- General Dynamics Corporation acquired Santa Bárbara Sistemas in July 2001.
- General Dynamics Corporation acquired the defence activity of EWK Eisenwerke Kaiserslautern in October 2002 and became GDELS - Germany in 2003.
- General Dynamics European Land Systems was founded in 2003.
- General Dynamics Corporation acquired the land defence vehicles unit of Steyr-Daimler-Puch Spezialfahrzeug GmbH in October 2003, and incorporated it to GDELS. Prior the full acquisition, General Dynamics already owned 25% of the company.
- In 1999, the defence unit of General Motors Canada acquired Mowag Motorwagenfabrik AG. In March 2003, General Dynamics acquired GM Defense. By 2004, Mowag was integrated to GDELS and became GDELS - Mowag GmbH.
- In November 2018, General Dynamics Corporation acquired FWW Fahrzeugwerk GmbH in Woldegk, Mecklenburg-Vorpommern, and it became GDELS - FWW GmbH in November 2019. FWW had been founded in 2001, to repair wheeled and tracked vehicles and components, "partnering with the Bundeswehr, NATO, Western European countries and the United Nations".

== Structure ==
=== Within General Dynamics Corporation ===
Within General Dynamics Corporation, as of January 2022, GDELS is one of the three "Combat Systems" business units, and all have there subsidiaries:

- General Dynamics European Land Systems, S.L (based in Spain)
- General Dynamics - Ordnance and Tactical Systems (based in USA)
- General Dynamics Land Systems which is based in the USA, and which has two major subsidiaries:
  - General Dynamics UK Ltd.
  - General Dynamics Land Systems Canada Corporation which has one subsidiary:
    - General Dynamics Land Systems Australia

=== Structure ===
The subsidiaries and official structure of General Dynamics European Land Systems, S.L are:

- General Dynamics European Land Systems - Austria GmbH
  - General Dynamics European Land Systems - Czech s.r.o.
- General Dynamics European Land Systems - Deutschland GmbH
  - General Dynamics European Land Systems – Bridge Systems GmbH
  - General Dynamics European Land Systems - FWW GmbH
- General Dynamics European Land Systems - Mowag GmbH
  - General Dynamics European Land Systems Botswana Proprietary Ltd.
  - General Dynamics European Land Systems Denmark ApS
  - General Dynamics European Land Systems Romania S.R.L.
- Santa Bárbara Sistemas S.A.

Note: The Botswanan, Czech, Danish and Romanian subsidiaries are liaison offices regarding contracts in execution with the military of these countries.

== Subsidiaries ==
=== GDELS Austria GmbH ===
For General Dynamics Corporation, Steyr-Daimler-Puch Spezialfahrzeug GmbH was an interesting prospect as they were collaborating with Santa Barbara Sistemas A GD subsidiary prior to its acquisition on the program ASCOD (Austrian - Spanish Cooperative Development), a new tracked infantry fighting vehicle.

==== Products ====
Note, only the products developed or manufactured after the acquisition by General Dynamics are mentioned here.

- Infantry fighting vehicles (platforms with multi-role potential):
  - ASCOD Ulan, not in production anymore
  - ASCOD 2
- Armoured fighting vehicles (multi-role platforms):
  - Pandur I (6×6), not in production anymore
  - Pandur I EVO (6×6)
  - Pandur II (8×8)

==== Gallery ====
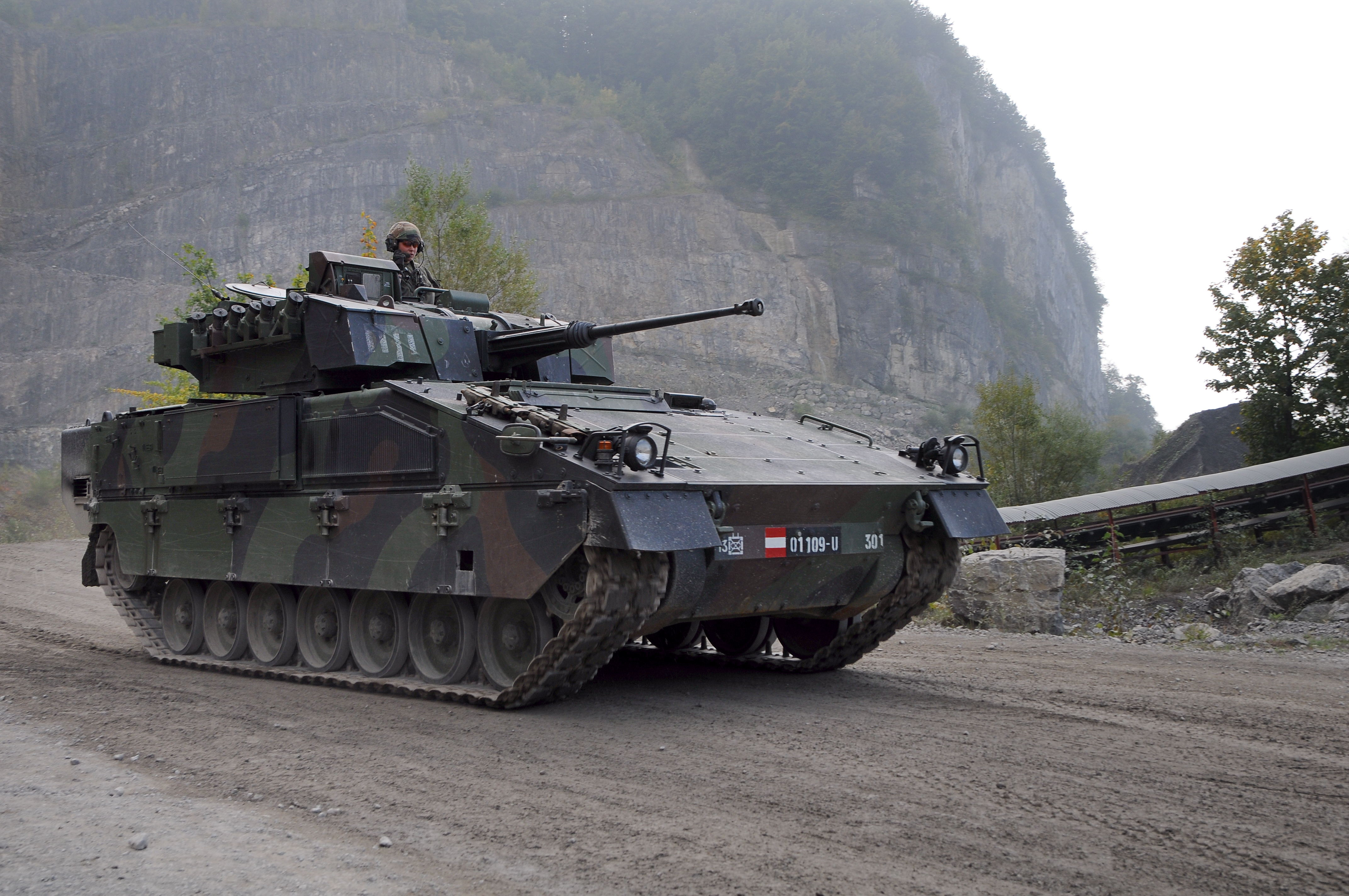
ASCOD, Austrian Army,
Schützenpanzer Ulan

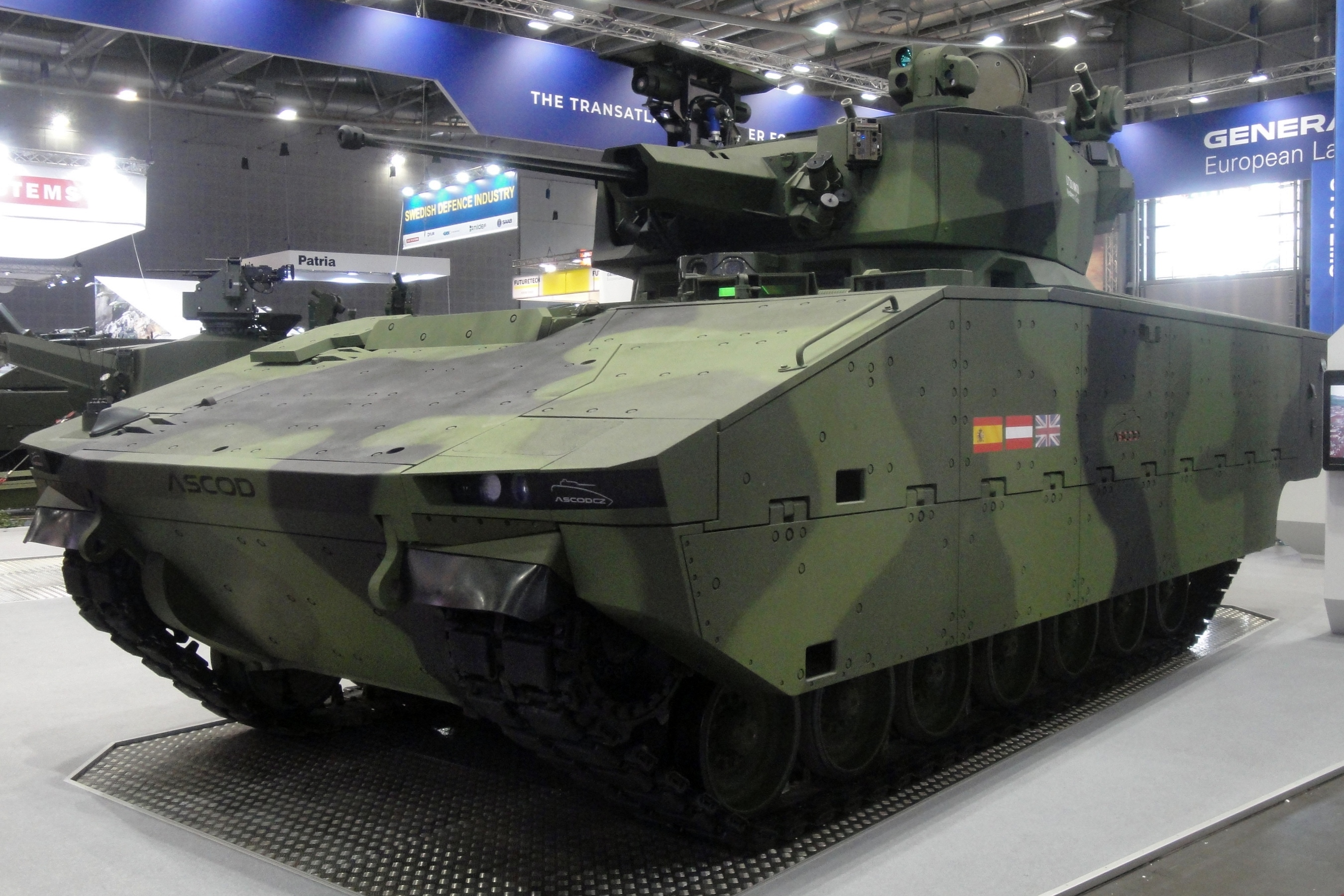
ASCOD 2, prototype

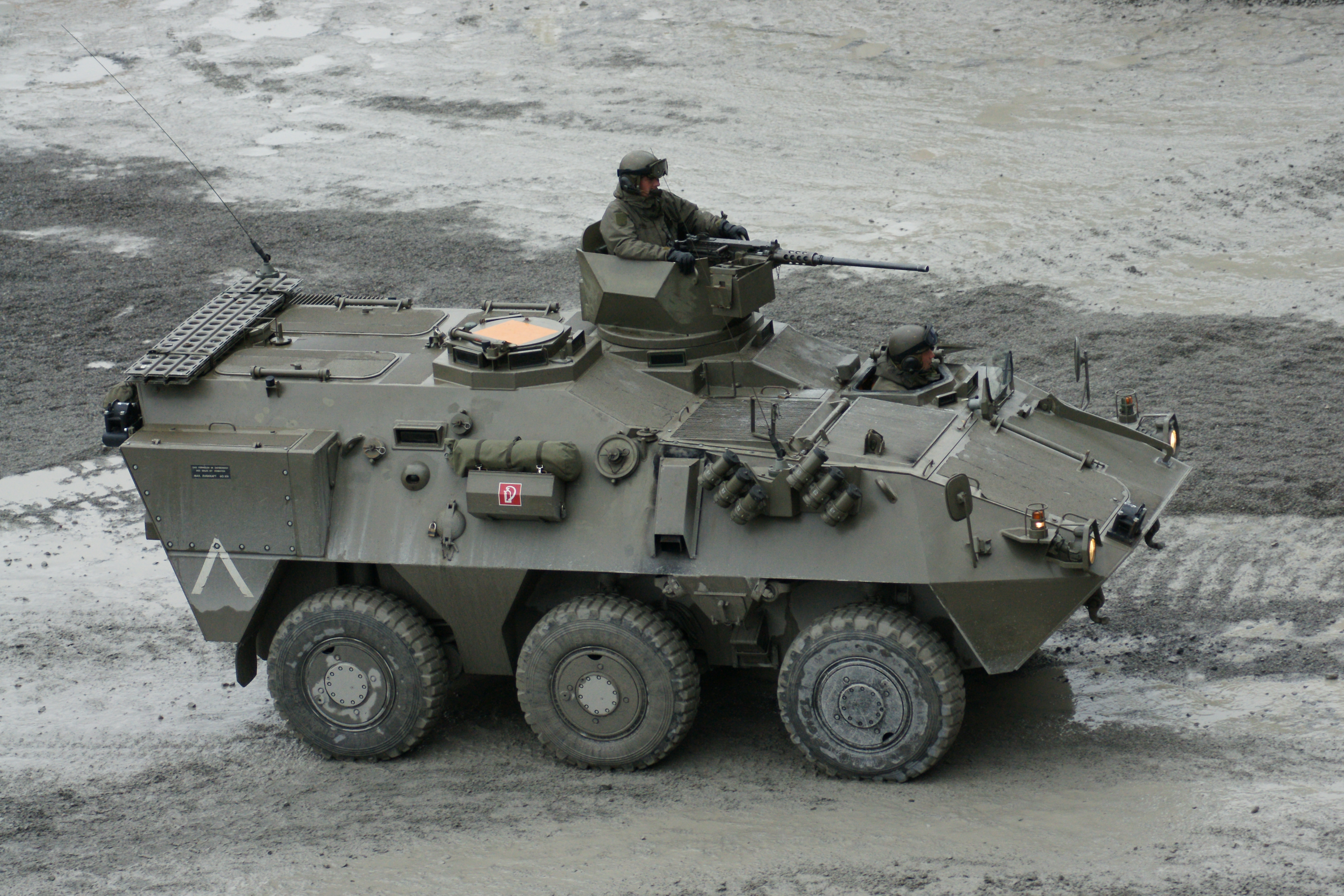
Pandur (6×6), Austrian Army,
MTPz

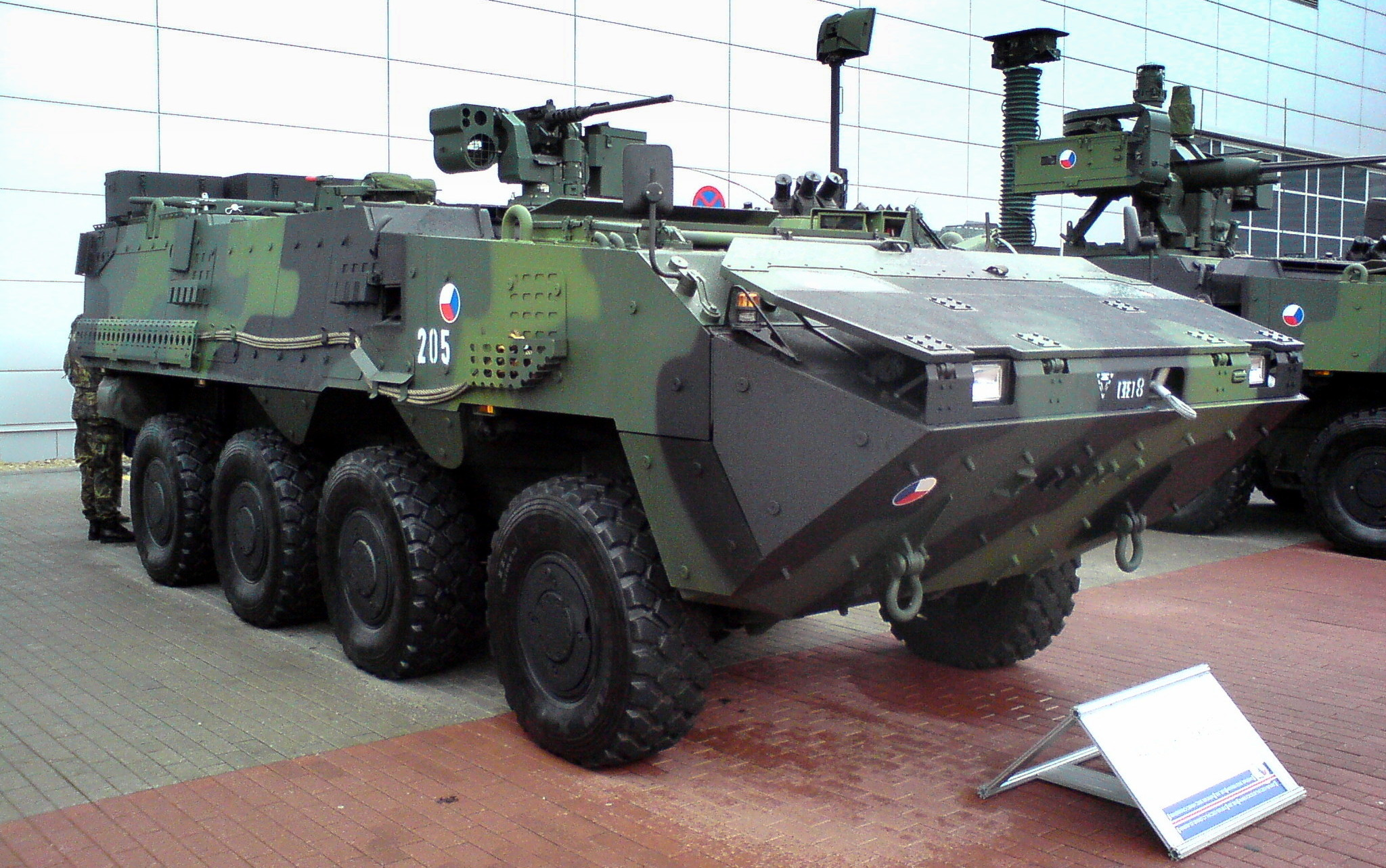
Pandur II(8×8), Czech Army,
KOT-Ž

=== GDELS Deutschland GmbH ===
==== Bridge Systems GmbH ====
EWK Eisenwerke Kaiserslautern was created as a steel construction company in 1864. In 2002, the defence activity was acquired by General Dynamics, it was temporarily associated to Santa Bárbara Sistemas. In 2003 GDELS was created, and EWK became GDELS– Bridge Systems GmbH, a subsidiary of GDELS - Deutschland GmbH. The core defence activity is focused on military bridging systems.

===== Products =====
Note, only the products developed or manufactured after the acquisition by General Dynamics are mentioned here.

- Pontoon bridges:
  - IRB (Improved Ribbon Bridge), MLC85 capacity:
    It is based on the American SRB (Standard Ribbon Bridge). It is a product offered by GDELS – Bridge Systems GmbH although it was initially an American product
  - M3 Amphibious Rig, MLC85 capacity:
    It is a self-propelled, amphibious pontoon bridge developed in the 1980s-90s by EWK for the German Army prior being part of GDELS, and is still in production.
  - Hydra:
    It is a modular pontoon boat
- Bridging vehicles:
  - ANACONDA, (MLC85 capacity, with 22 m gaps):
    It is the evolution of the BIBER bridge launcher, the system is available on tanks. A new variant is offered in collaboration with Rheinmetall with its truck, the HX2.
  - PYTHON, (MLC80+ capacity with 13 m gaps):
    It is known as the Rapidly employed bridge system (REBS), it is typically launched from 10-15 tons 8×8 trucks, it is also available for vehicles like the Piranha IV, Piranha V, and Boxer.
  - COBRA, (MLC50 capacity with 15 m gaps):
    It is a variable folding bridge, flexible, prototypes of this bridge exist on the Boxer, the ASCOD 2, the Piranha IV and V. Pearson Engineering supplies temporary or permanent support Bridge Launching Mechanism.
  - VIPER, (MLC40 capacity with 4, 6 and 8 meters gaps):
    It is a lightweight modular multi.purpose solution that can be adapted on light armoured vehicles like the Mowag Eagle V (4×4).
  - QBB (2.5 m unprepared gaps span):
    It is a very lightweight Quad Bike Bridge.
- Footbridge:
  - MAMBA (span of 30 m):
    Ultra lightweight footbridge, to be used by to cross wide gaps, assembled by hand, and transportable by light trucks, helicopters, etc. It is already operational with the German Army.

===== Gallery of equipment of GDELS - Bridge Systems GmbH =====
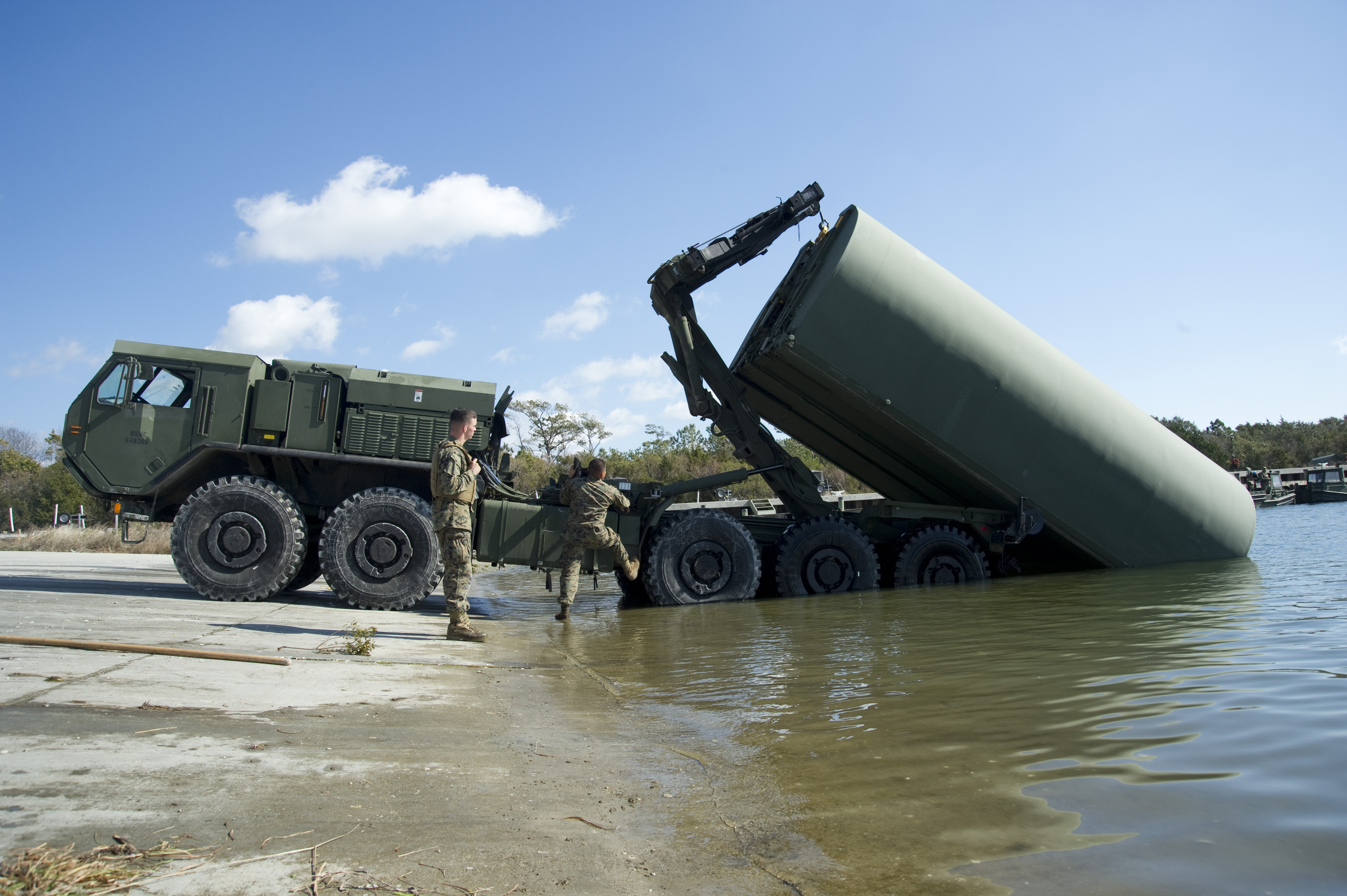
IRB,US Marine Corps,
Improved Ribbon Bridge

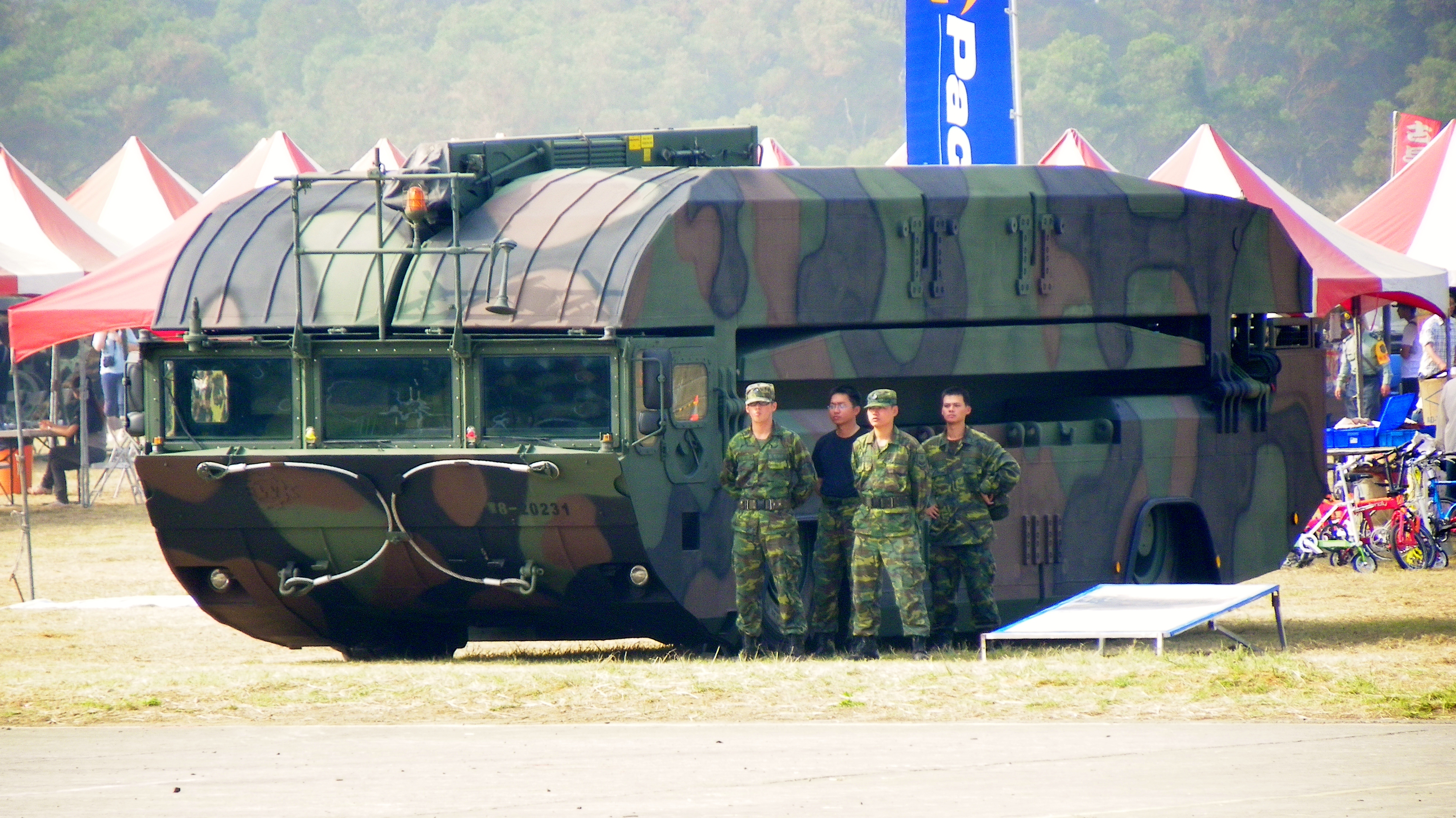
M3, German Army,
Schwimmschnellbrücke Amphibie

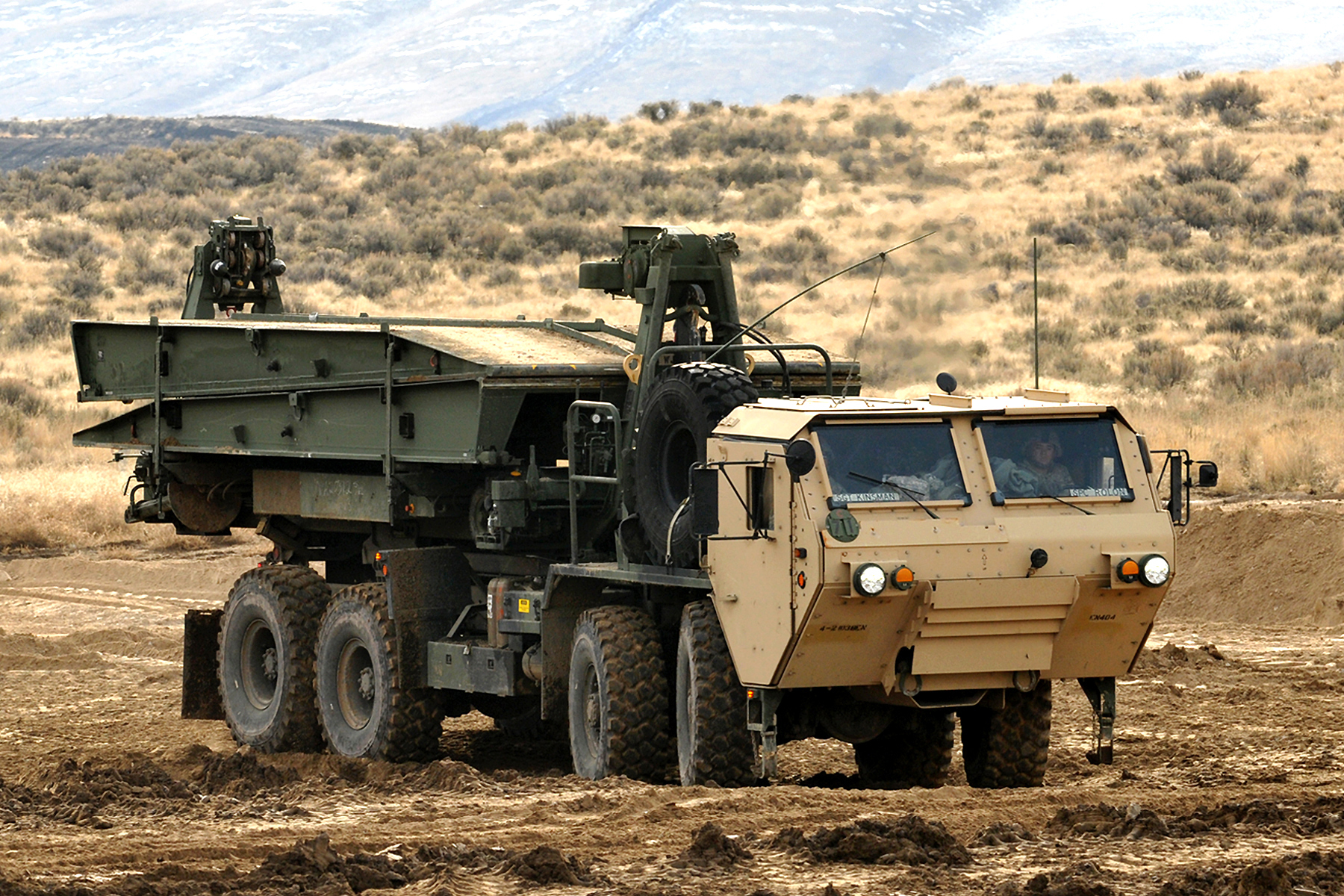
PYTHON, US Army,
Rapidly employed bridge system (REBS)

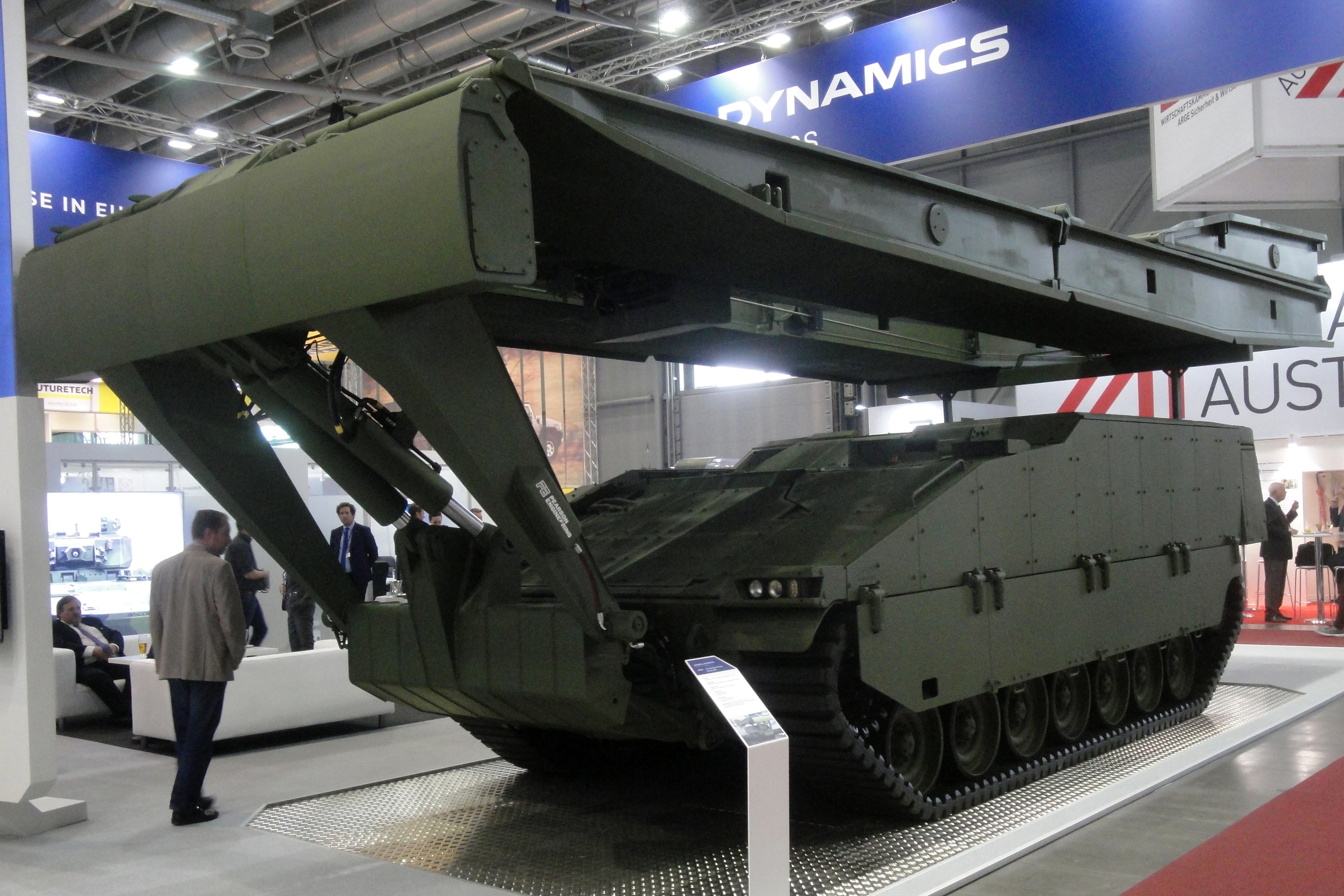
COBRA, prototype on ASCOD 2
Variable Folding Bridge

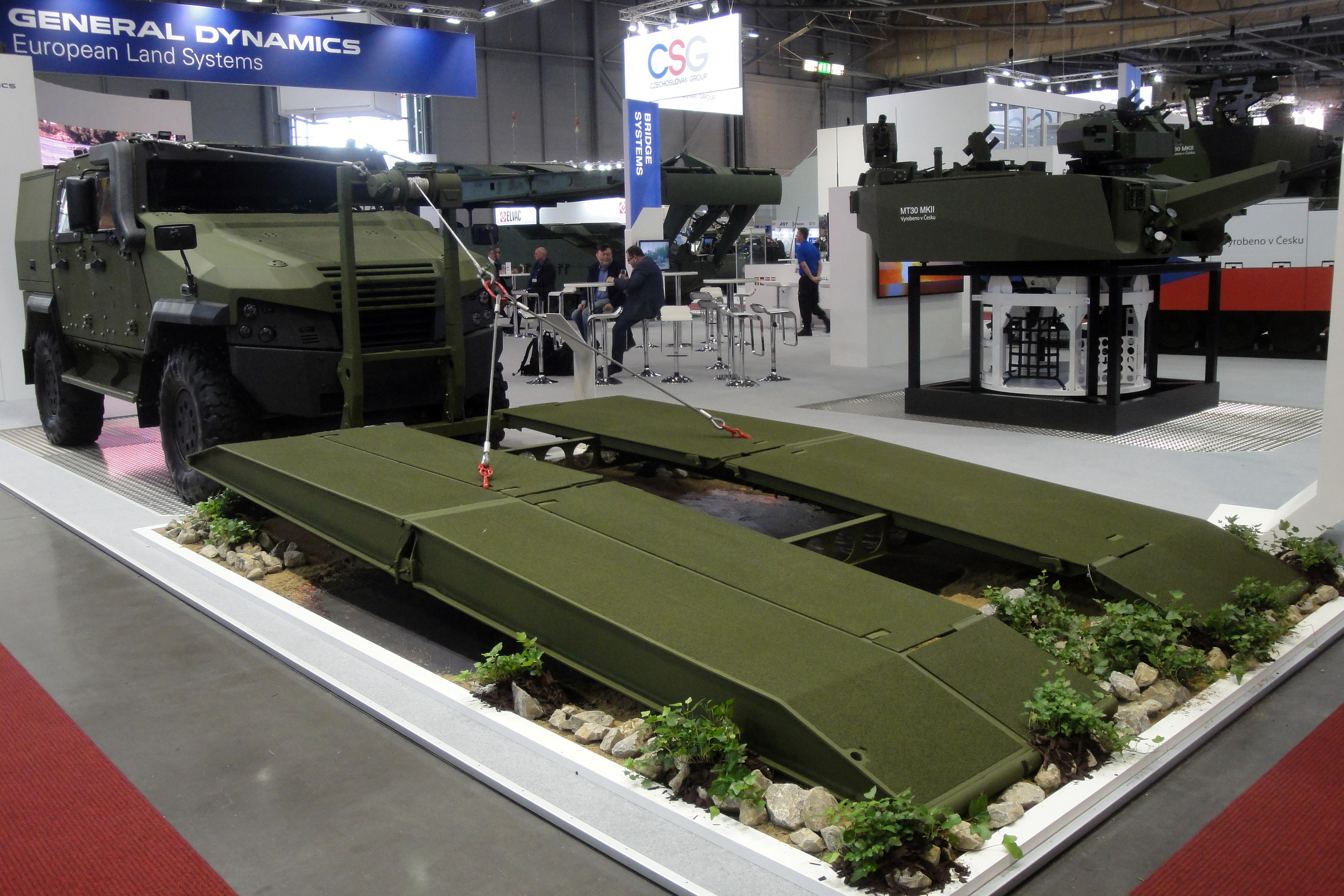
VIPER, prototype on Eagle V Austrian Army,
MTPz

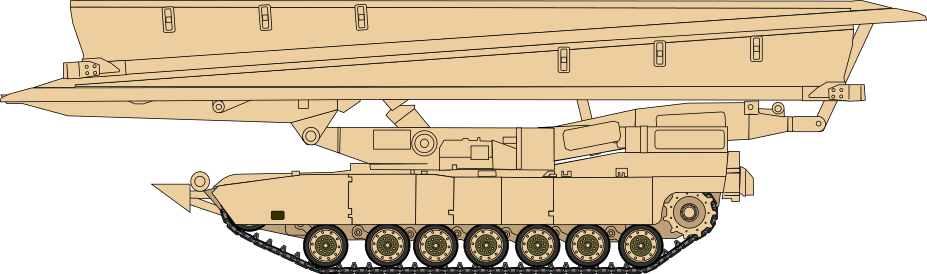
ANACONDA, US Army,
M104 Wolverine

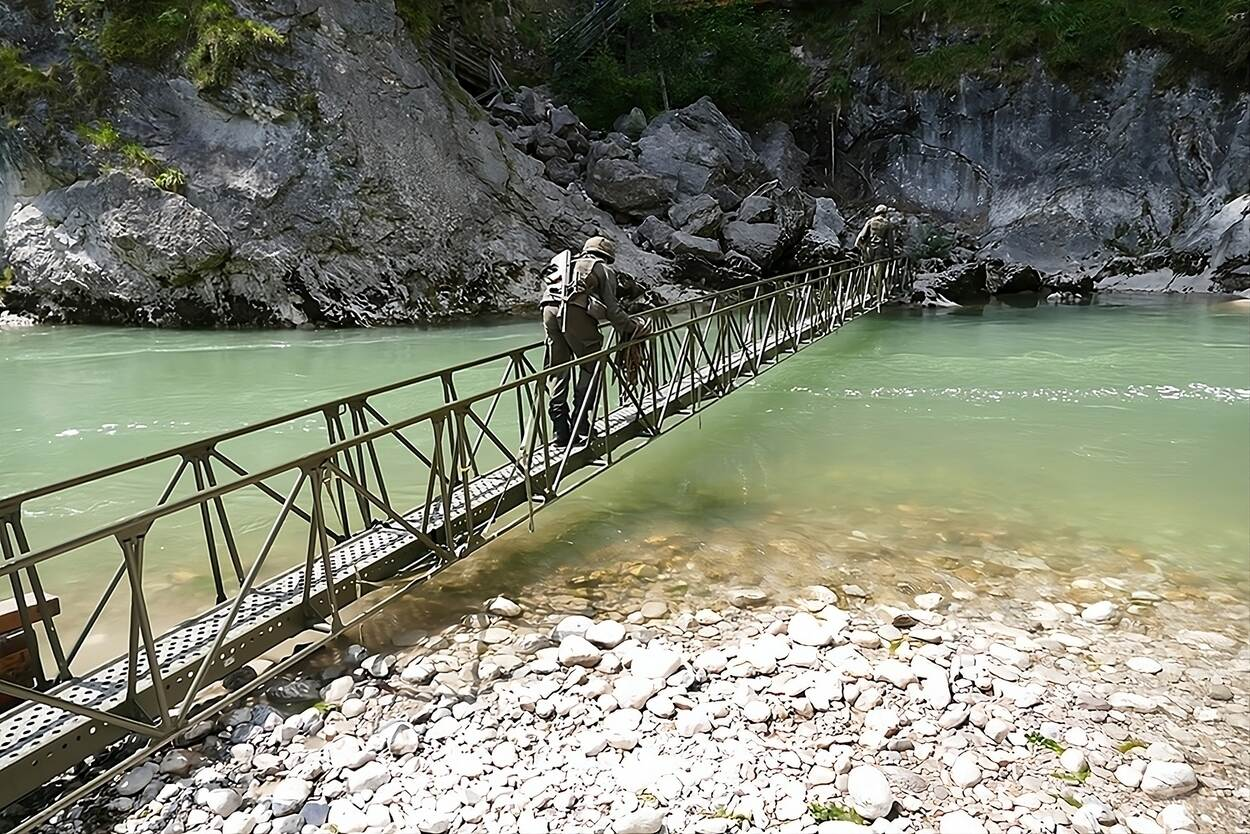
MAMBA

==== General Dynamics European Land Systems - FWW GmbH ====
FWW Fahrzeugwerk GmbH is a company that was founded in 2001. It was developed as a service and maintenance provider for military customers. Its main client became the German Army. It also has activities as an arms dealer.

=== GDELS Mowag GmbH ===
General Dynamics Corporation expanded its business in land systems at the beginning of the years 2000. General Motors Canada and its subsidiaries were a major player in the field of light and middle armoured vehicles. The main vehicles being manufactured by GM Canada included the highly successful Mowag Piranha family and its derivatives:

- the Canadian LAV family (which included at that time the LAV I, LAV II and LAV III)
- the Australian ASLAV
- the American LAV-25 and the Stryker (which entered service in the US Army in 2002)

Mowag Motorwagenfabrik AG was therefore part of the acquisition in 2003, and as the corporate structure was adapted, Mowag was put under the leadership of GDELS S.L. but it still collaborated heavily with GDLS Canada, GDLS USA, and GD UK.

==== Products ====
Note, only the products developed or manufactured after the acquisition by General Dynamics are mentioned here.

- Multi-role / reconnaissance / infantry mobility vehicle:
  - Duro was developed and manufactured by Bucher-Guyer AG. The program was acquired by Mowag Motorwagenfabrik AG in 2003, after it was purchased by General Dynamics Corporation.
    - Duro, not in production anymore
    - Duro II, not in production anymore
    - Duro III
    - Duro 3P / YAK
    - Duro-E, a new variant offered by GDELS - Mowag in development, an electric powered variant
    - LFAV, light fire attack vehicle, not in production anymore Vehicle based on 4×4 chassis for the Singapore Civil Defence Force.
  - Eagle
    - Eagle III, not in production anymore
    - Eagle IV, based on the Mowag Duro chassis, not in production anymore
    - Eagle V 4×4, based on the Mowag Duro chassis
    - Eagle V 6×6, based on the Mowag Duro chassis
  - LTV Merlin, Light Tactical Vehicle This is a new vehicle offered, fitting the requirements for airborne, special forces and light infantry, it fits in the CH-47 and CH-53.
- Multi-role combat vehicle (APC / AFV / IFV / reconnaissance):
  - Piranha
    - Piranha III (from 1996)
    - Piranha IIIH (from 1999)
    - Piranha IIIC 8×8
    - Piranha IIIC 10×10
    - Piranha IV 6×6
    - Piranha IV 8×8
    - Piranha IV 10×10
    - Piranha V 8×8
- Artillery
  - RCH-155 - Piranha IV 10×10

==== Gallery ====
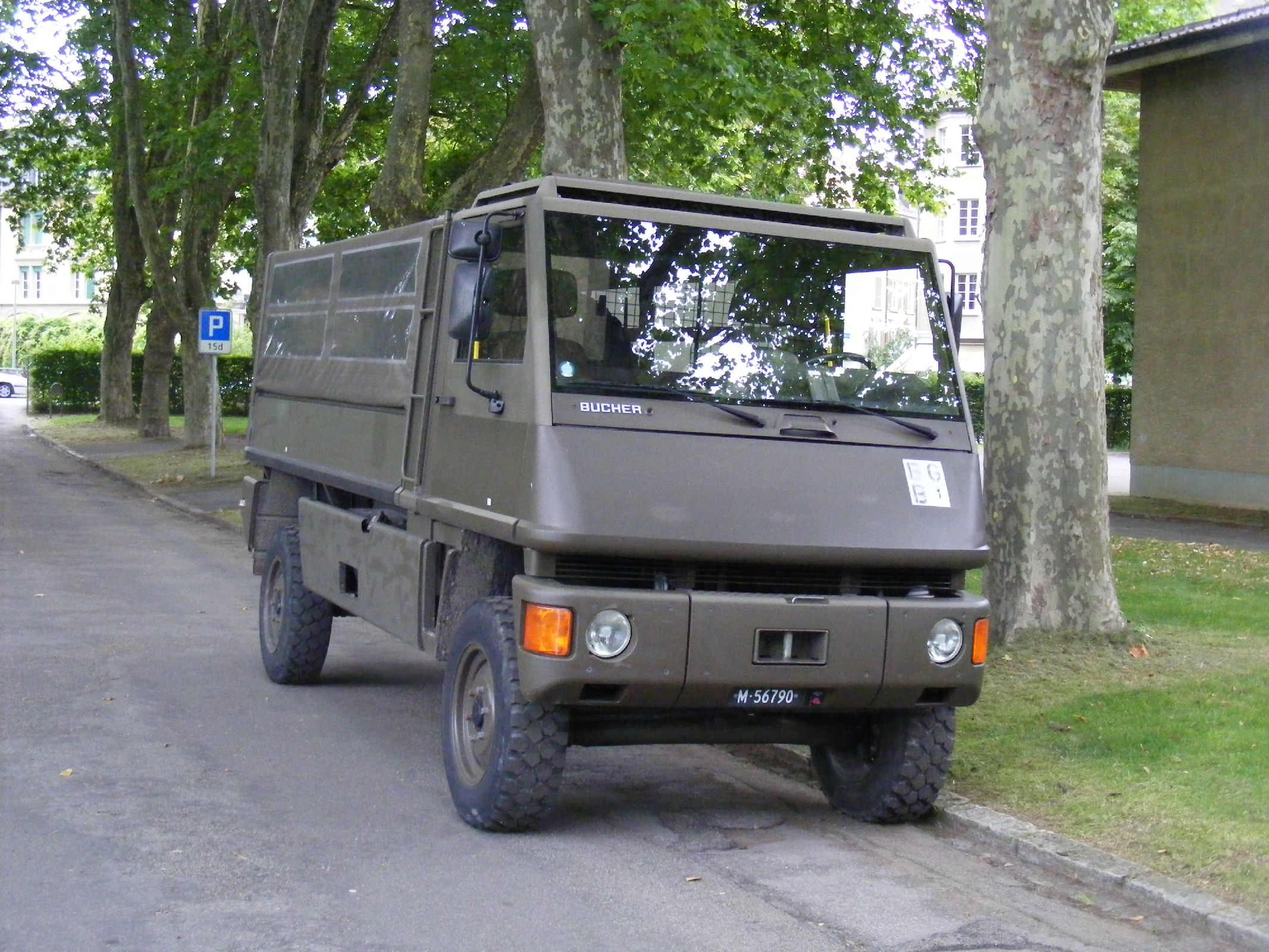
Duro I, Swiss Army

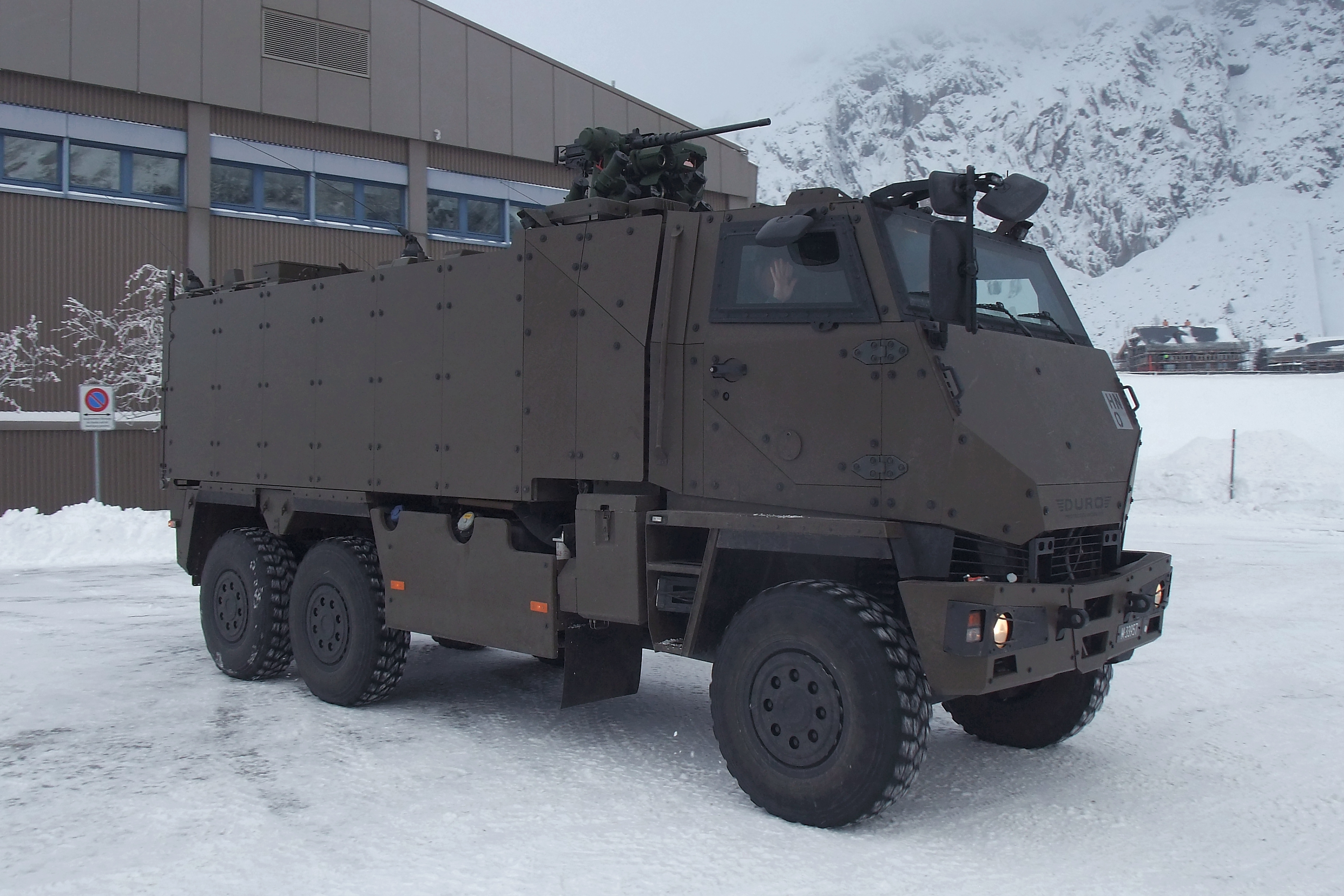
Duro IIIP, Swiss Army,
Duro GMTF

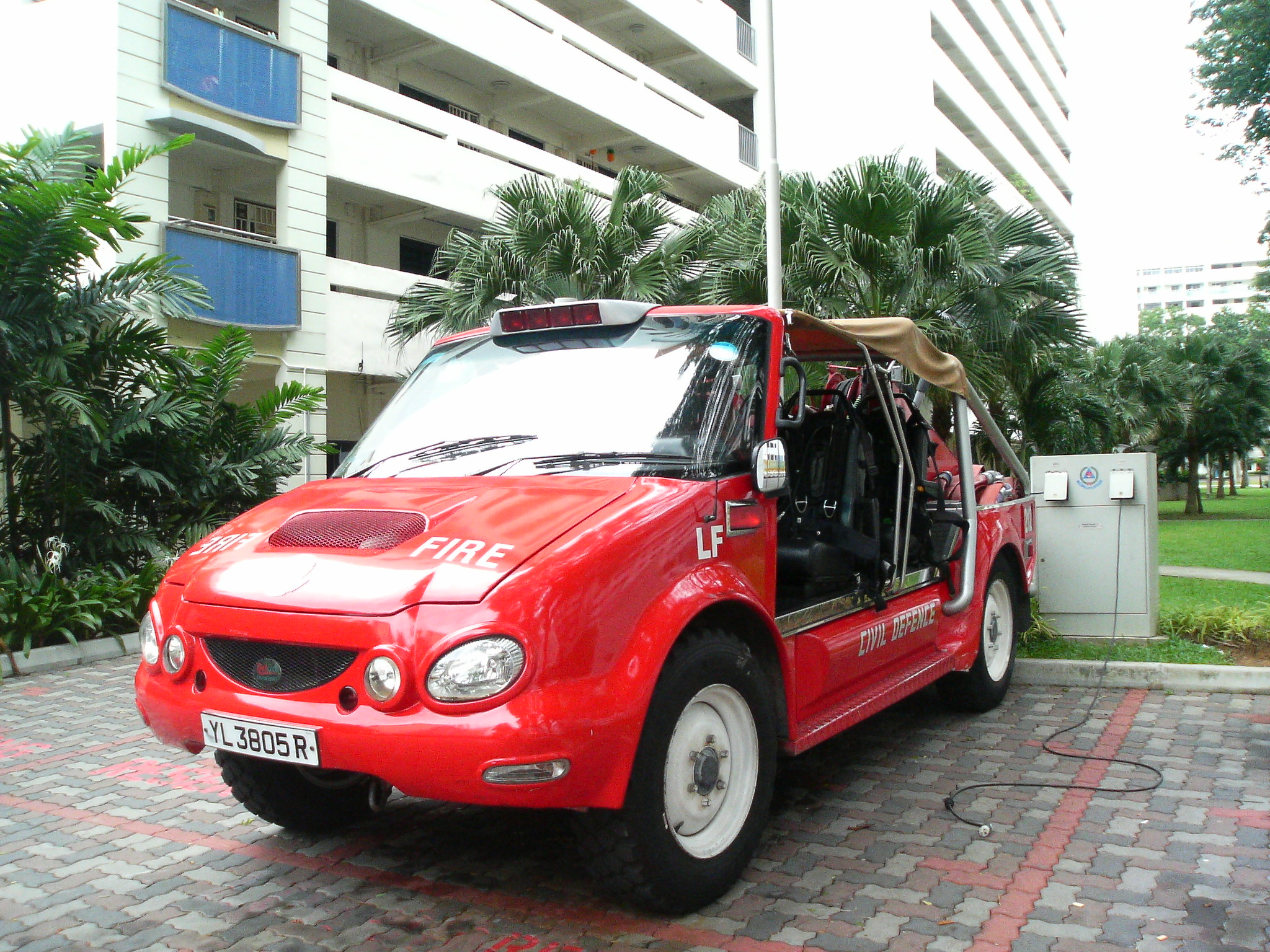
Duro chassis, LFAV,
"Red Rhino"

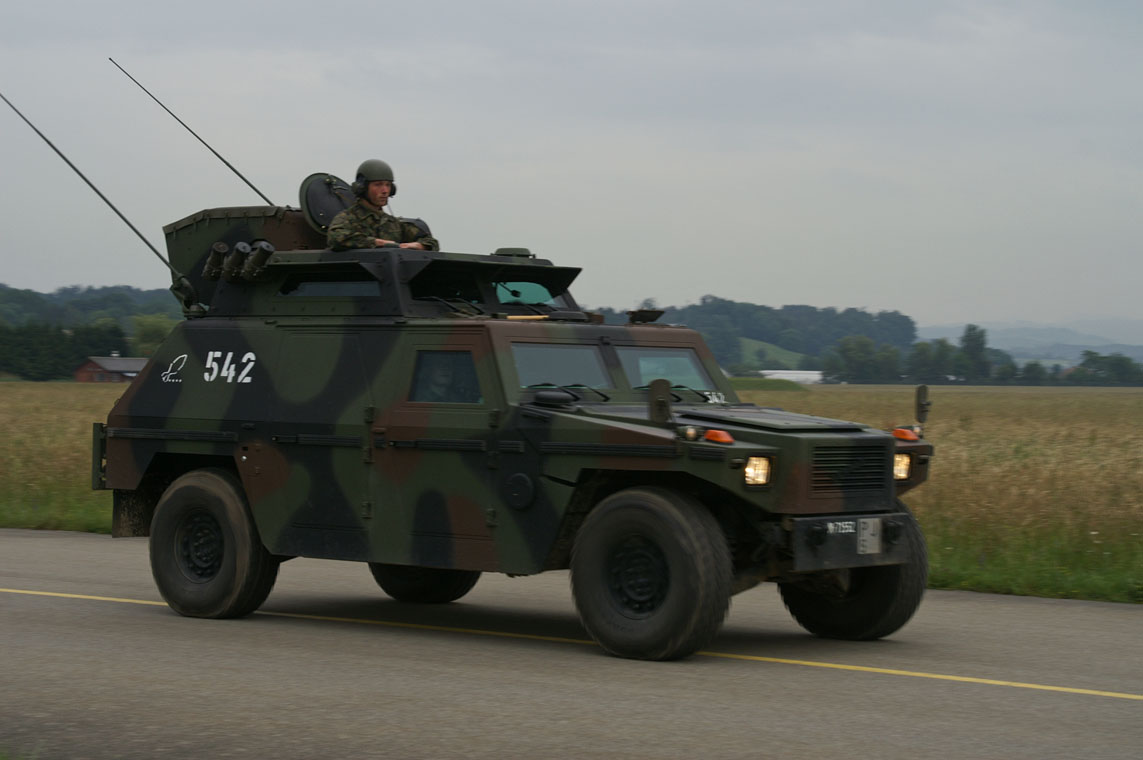
Eagle III, Swiss Army,
SKdt Fz INTAFF gl 4x4

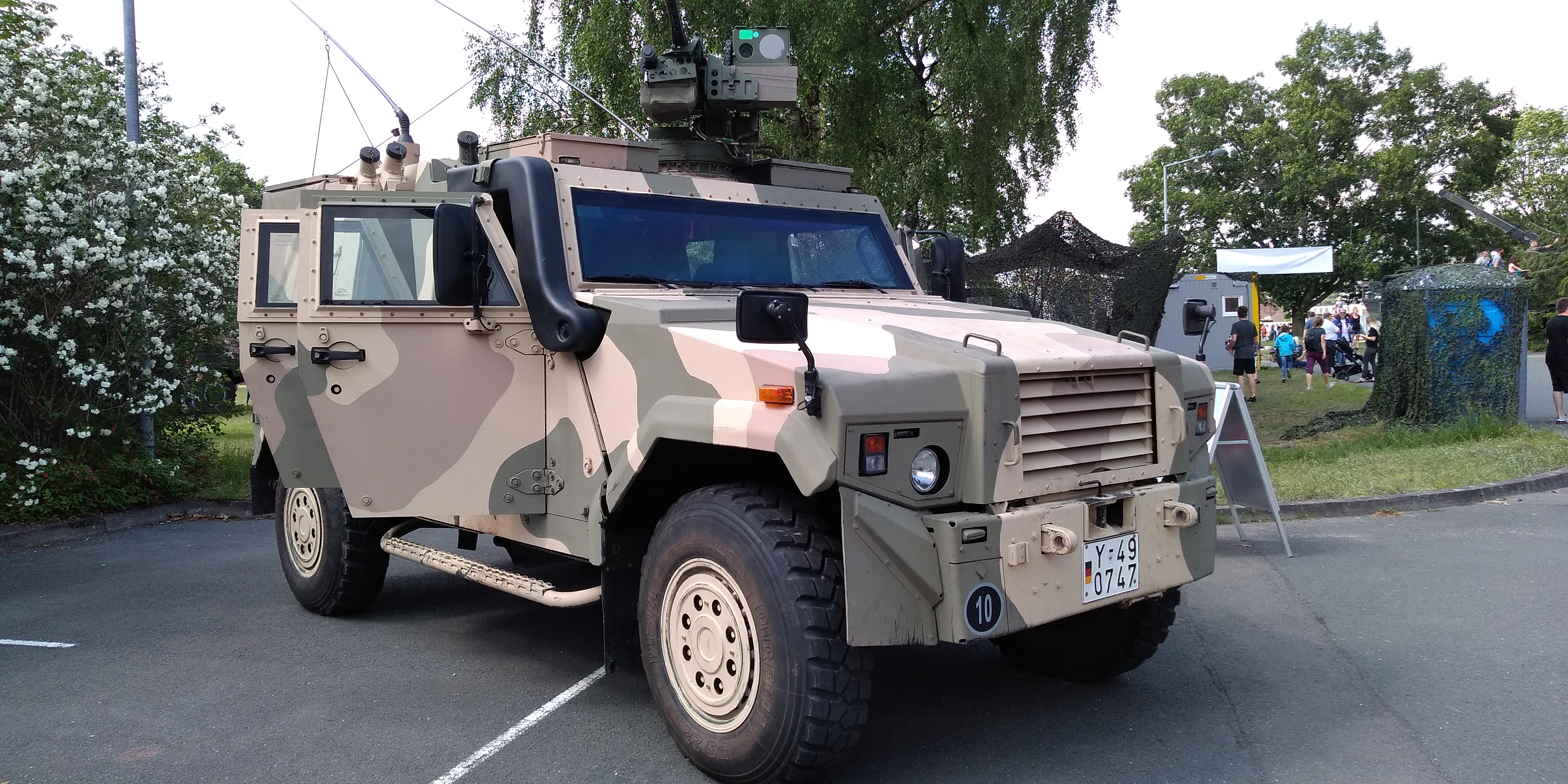
Eagle IV, German Army,
GFF2

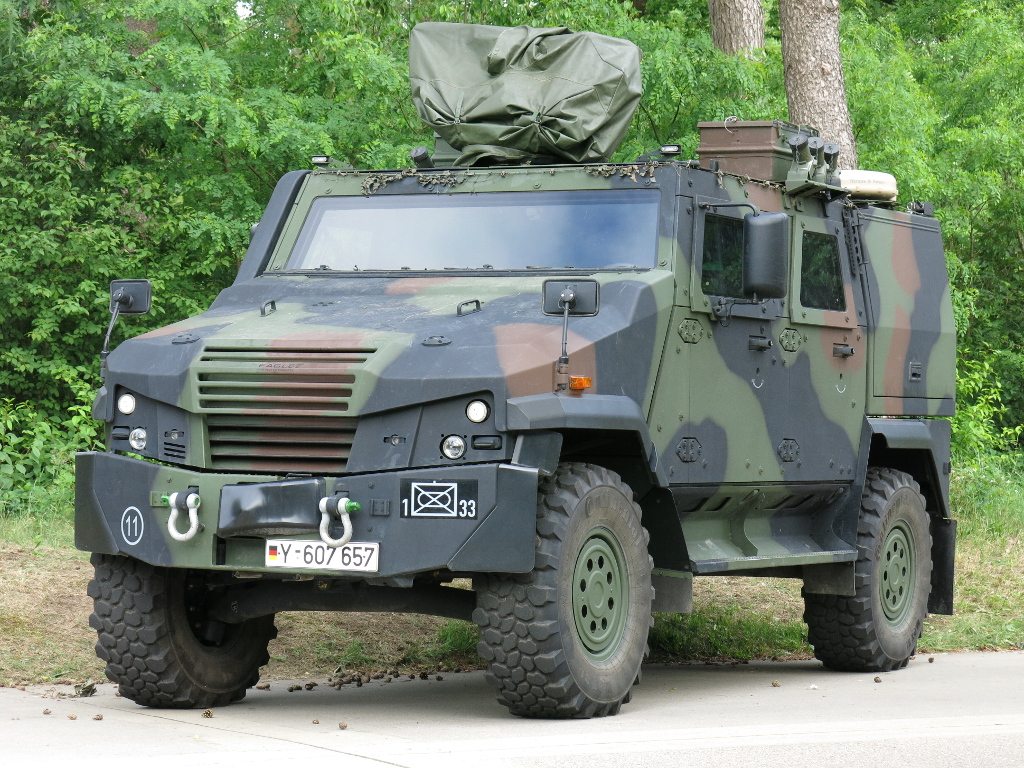
Eagle V 4x4, German Army,
GFF2

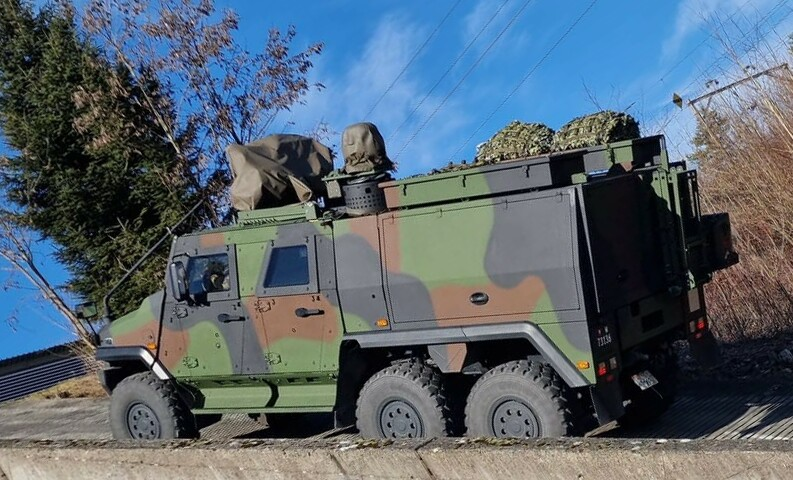
Eagle V 6x6, Swiss Army,
Aufklärungssystem TASYS

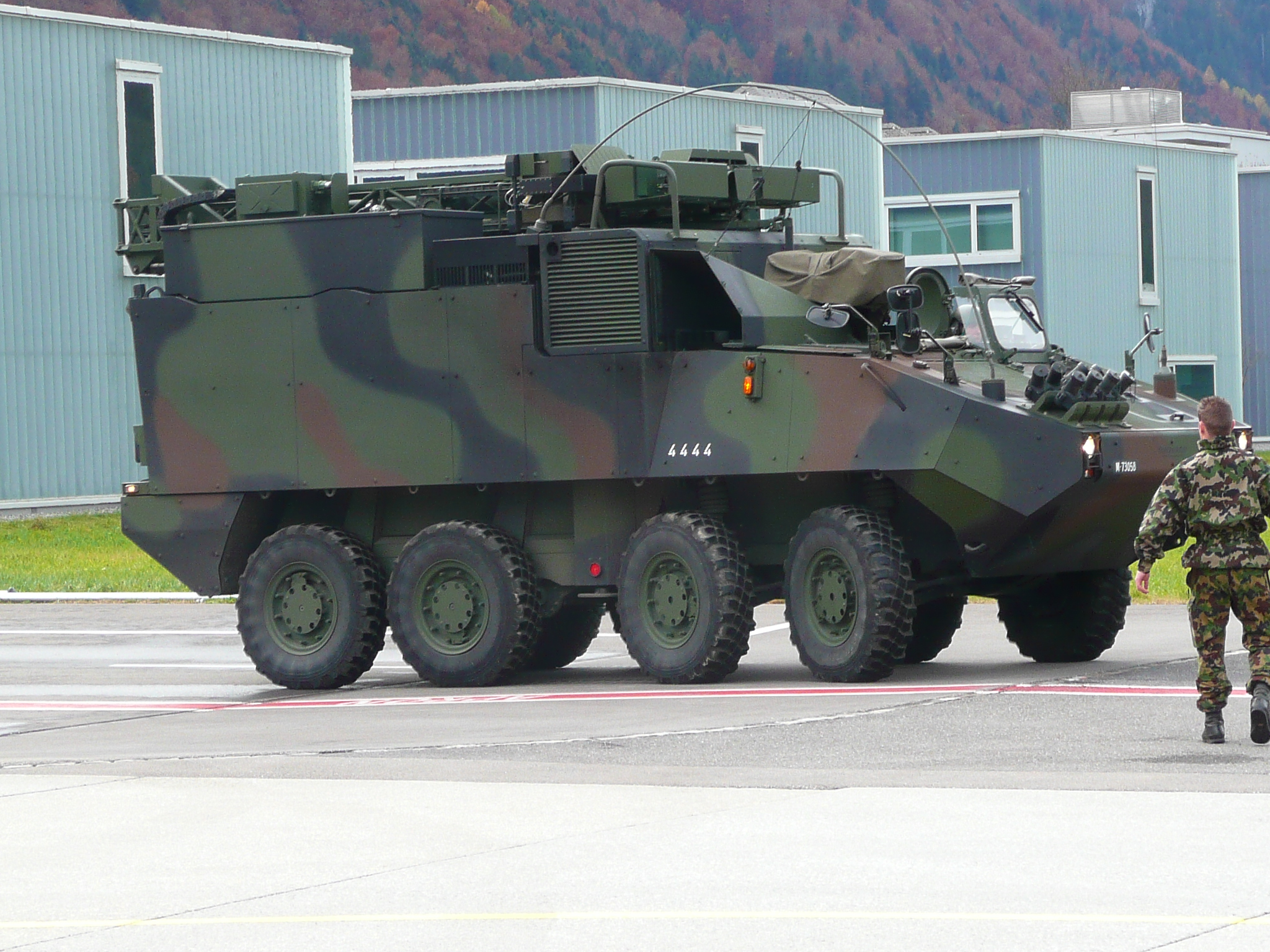
Piranha IIIC, Swiss Army,
Piranha IIIC RAP Pz

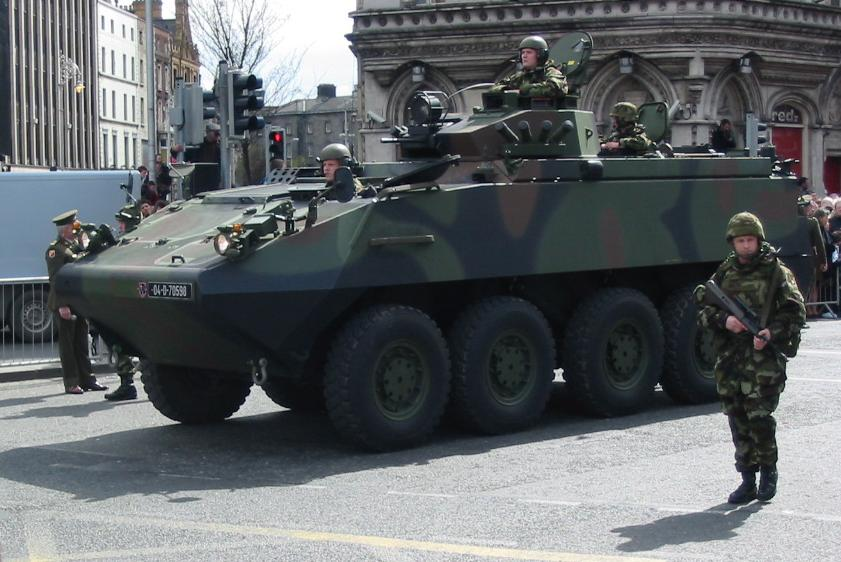
Piranha IIIH, Irish Army,
Cavalry Reconnaissance Vehicle

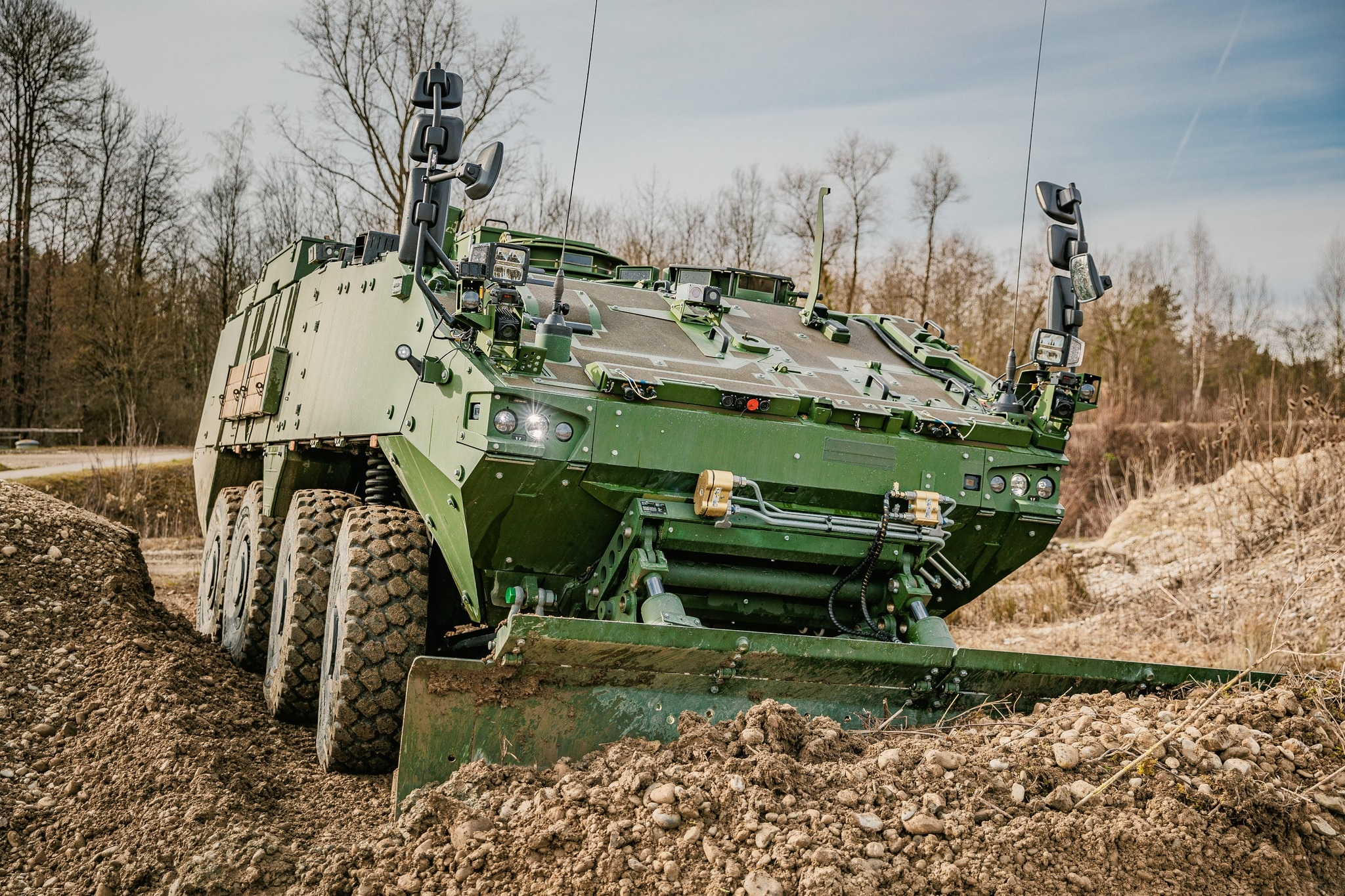
Piranha IV, Swiss Army,
Pionier Panzerfahrzeug 21

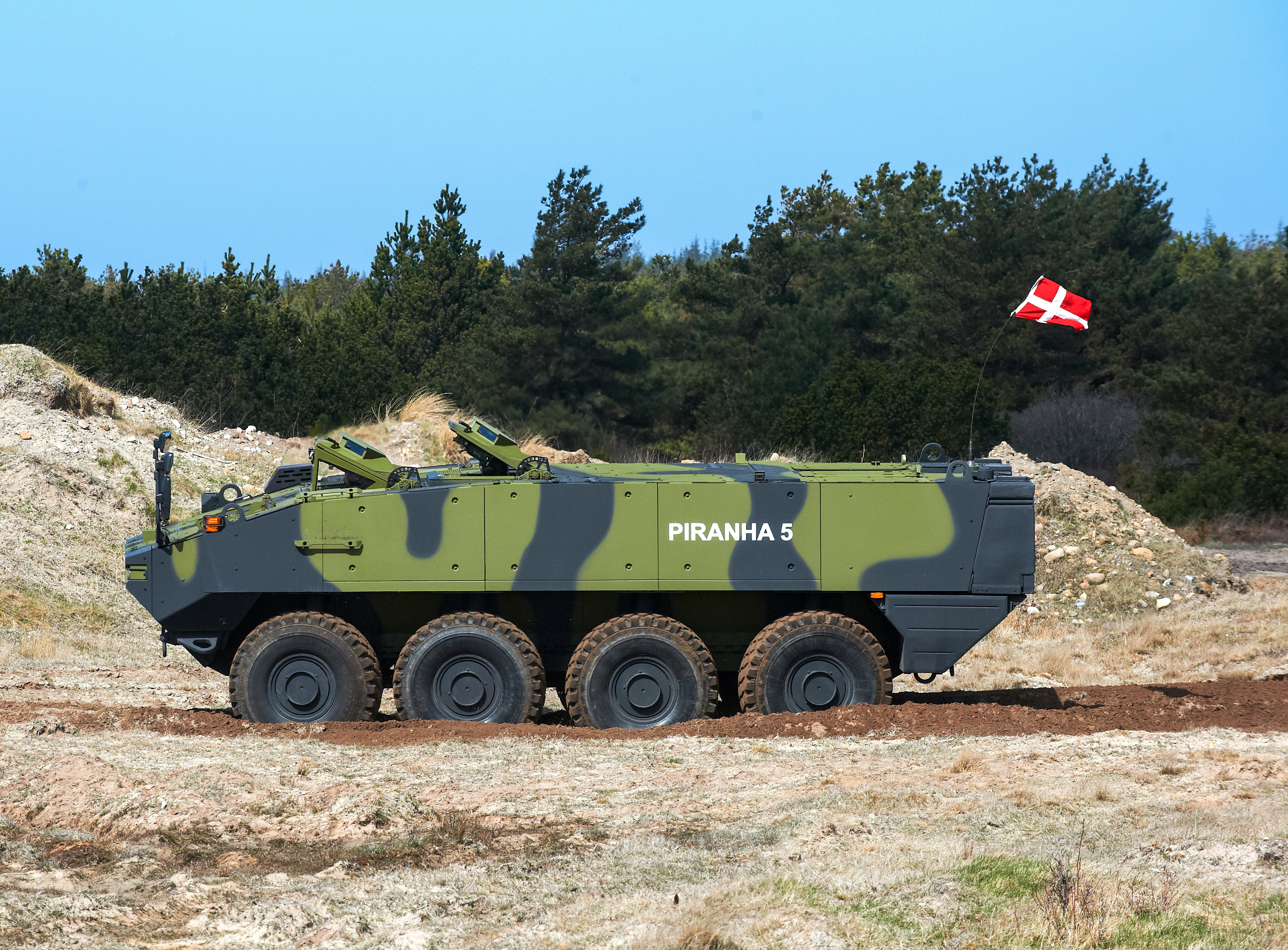
Piranha V, Danish Army

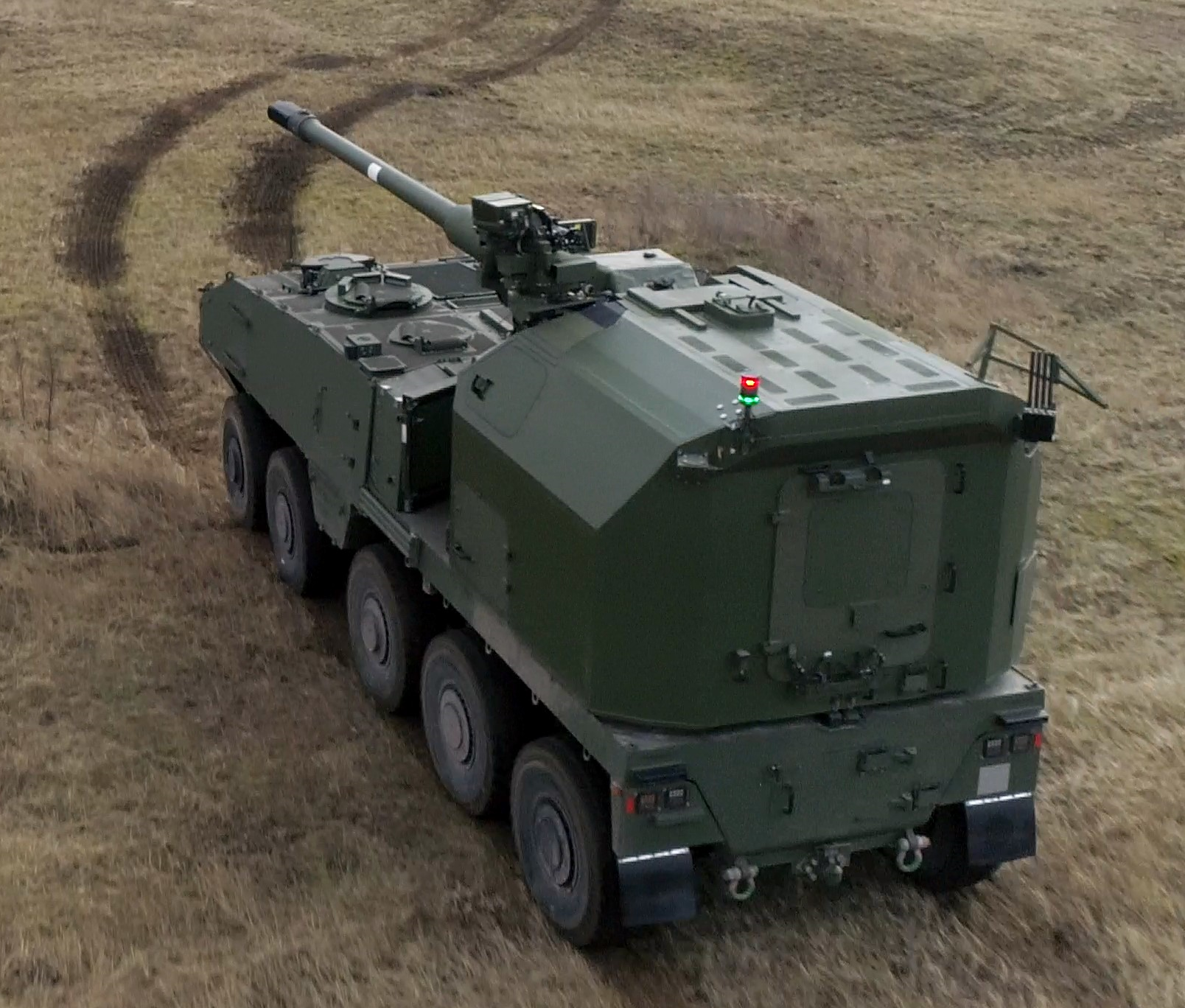
Piranha IV 10×10, Swiss Army, RCH-155

=== Santa Bárbara Sistemas S.A. ===
General Dynamics acquired SBS in 2001. SBS is the primary supplier of land equipment for the Spanish Army, and it is also involved on other equipment for the Spanish and European military forces. It has also some parts of the business focused on civilian sectors (aeronautics, as well as thermal and surface treatments).

==== Products ====
- Tracked armoured vehicles:
  - Leopard 2E: Spanish variant of the Leopard 2A6, manufactured under licence in Spain by SBS from 2002 to 2008.
  - ASCOD platform:
    - Pizarro, an Infantry / Cavalry fighting vehicle, not in production anymore
    - ASCOD 2, evolution of the Pizarro designed in collaboration with GDELS - Austria.
    - VCZ Castor, an armoured engineering vehicle
    - VAC, successor planned to the 600 M113 in the Spanish Army, based on the VCZ Castor chassis., to be produced from 2024, and to be fitted with the same equipment and combat system as on the Dragon VCR. Vehicle in development and to be produced by Tess defence, a joint venture of SBS, Indra Sistemas, Sapa, and Escribano M&E.
    - Sabrah light tank: Based on the ASCOD 2, modifications designed in collaboration with GDLS, and Elbit Systems.
    - Ajax, designed and manufactured for the British Army in collaboration with General Dynamics UK
  - Track systems:
    - SATT: a Self Adjusting Track Tensioner patented, and tested on the ASCOD 2 in 2025
- Multi-role combat vehicle (APC / AFV / IFV / reconnaissance):
  - Dragón VCR based on the Piranha V, existing in multiple variants:
    - VCR, an infantry fighting vehicle
    - VEC, a reconnaissance vehicle
    - VCR-PC, a company command post
    - VCOAV (Vehículos de Combate de Observador Avanzado), an artillery forward observer vehicle
    - VCR-ZAP, an armoured engineering vehicle
- MRAP / EOD vehicle:
  - RG-31 Mk5E, local assembly of the units bought by the Spanish Army
- Artillery:
  - Santa Bárbara Sistemas 155/52, development, production, and modernisation of this towed howitzer
- Small arms:
  - G36E - Assault rifle
  - Heckler & Koch MG4 - Light machine gun
- Missiles:
  - Warhead and rocket motors and assembly of Spanish military Meteor, Mistral and Spike missiles (Spike LR, Spike LR II, Spike ER)
- Munitions:
  - Small calibre munitions
  - Medium calibre munitions
  - Tank rounds
  - Artillery rounds
  - Explosives and powder

==== Gallery of equipment of Santa Bárbara Sistemas S.A. ====
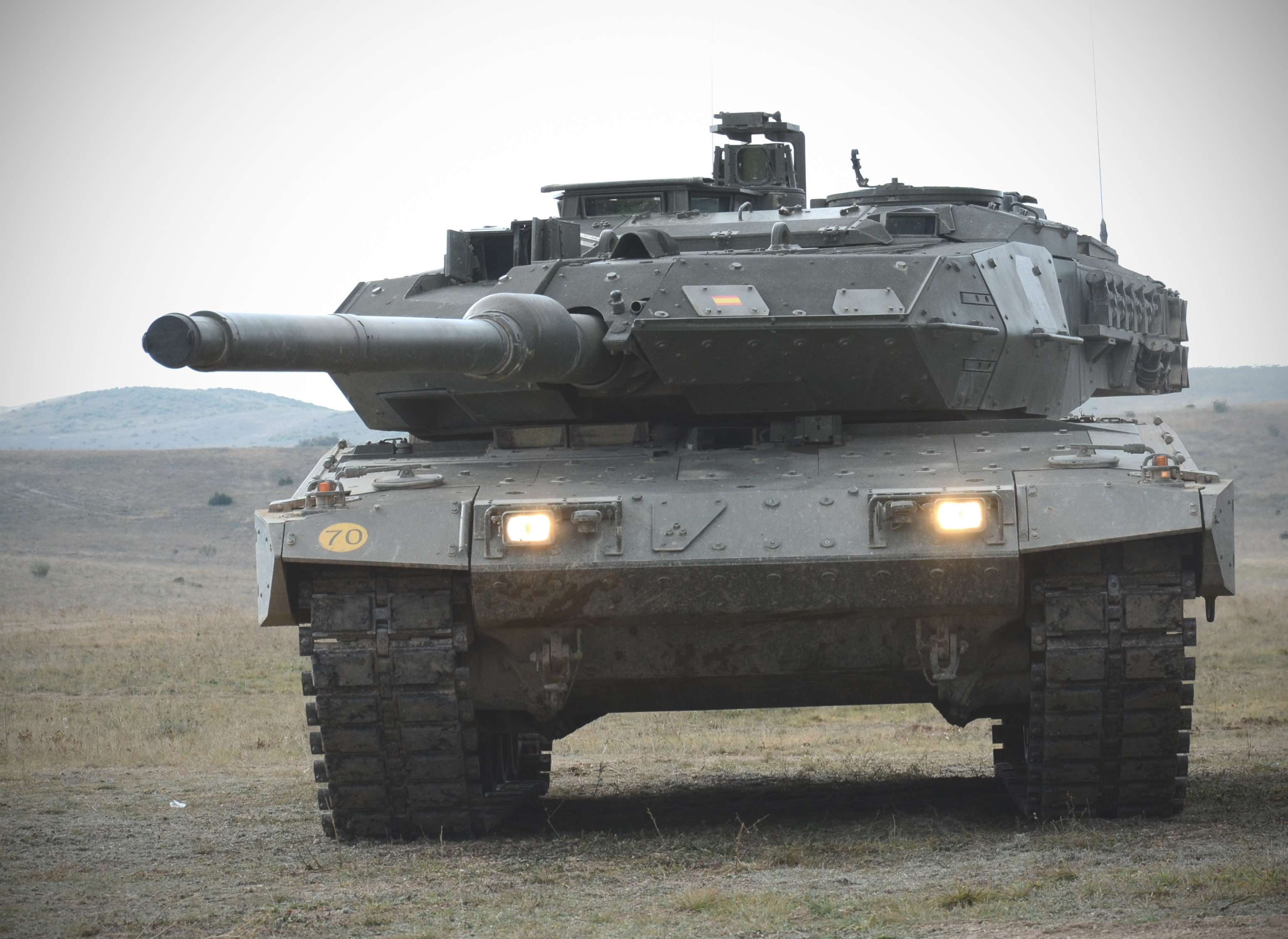
Leopard 2E, Spanish Army

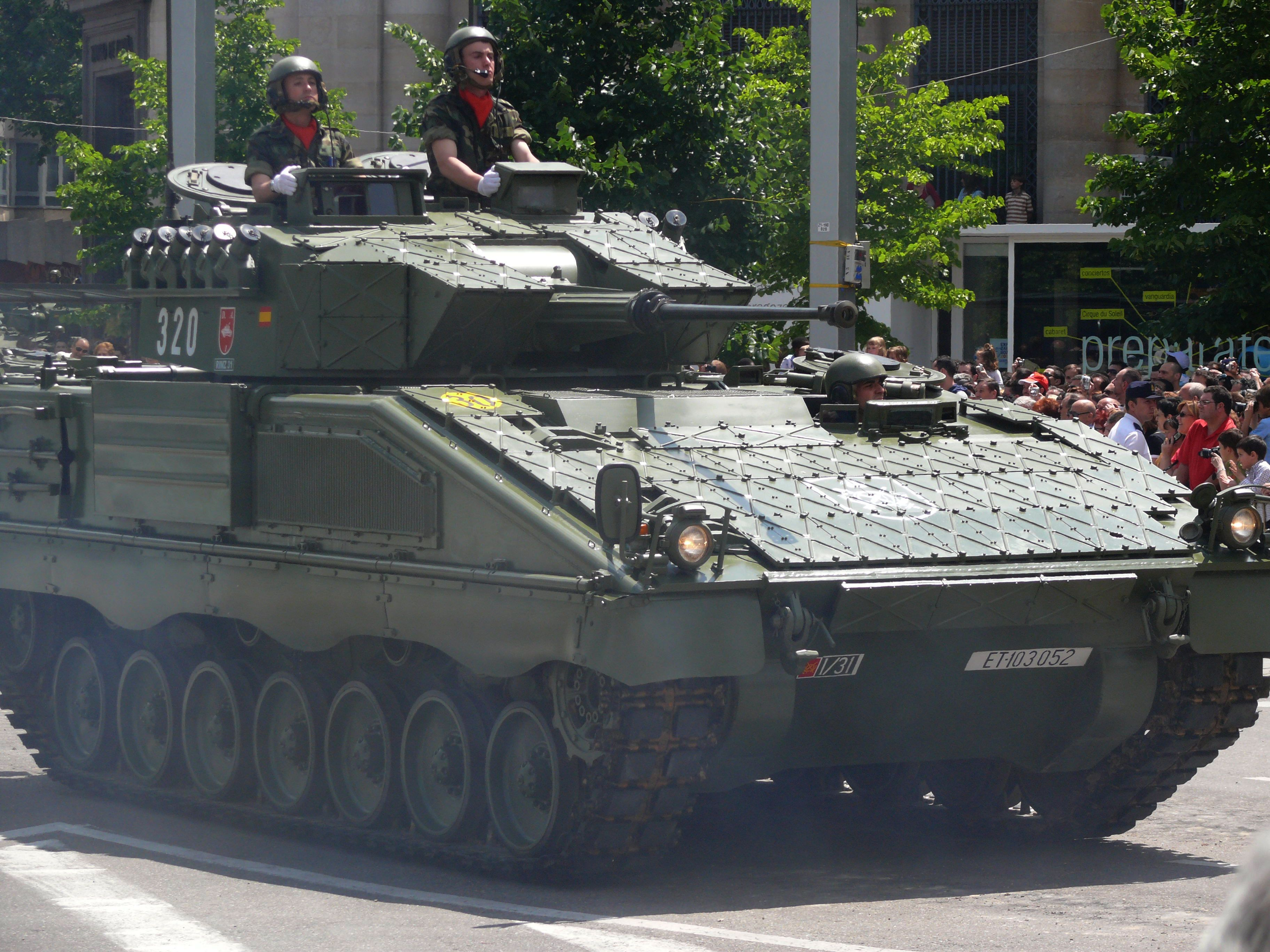
ASCOD, Spanish Army,
Pizarro

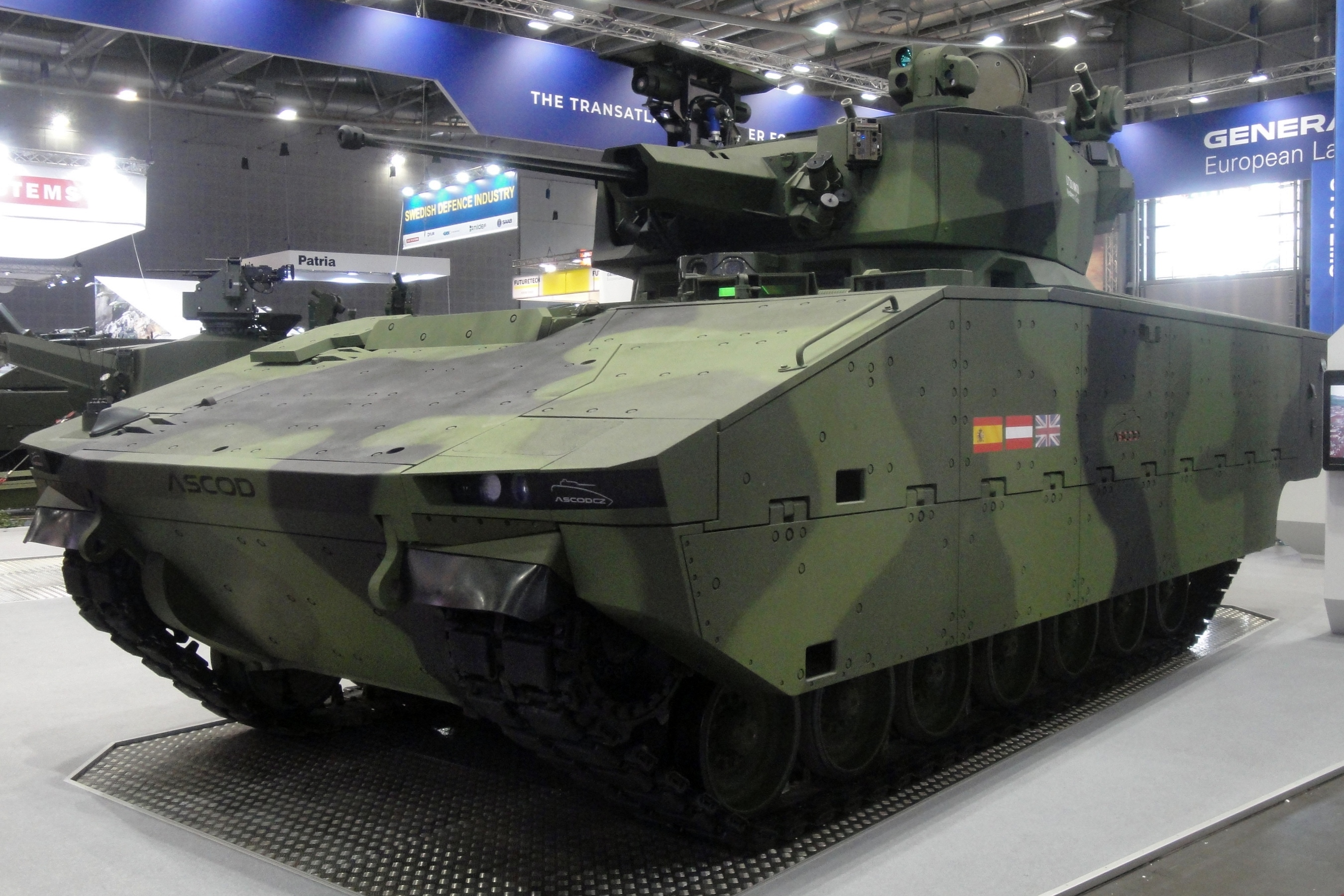
ASCOD 2, Prototype

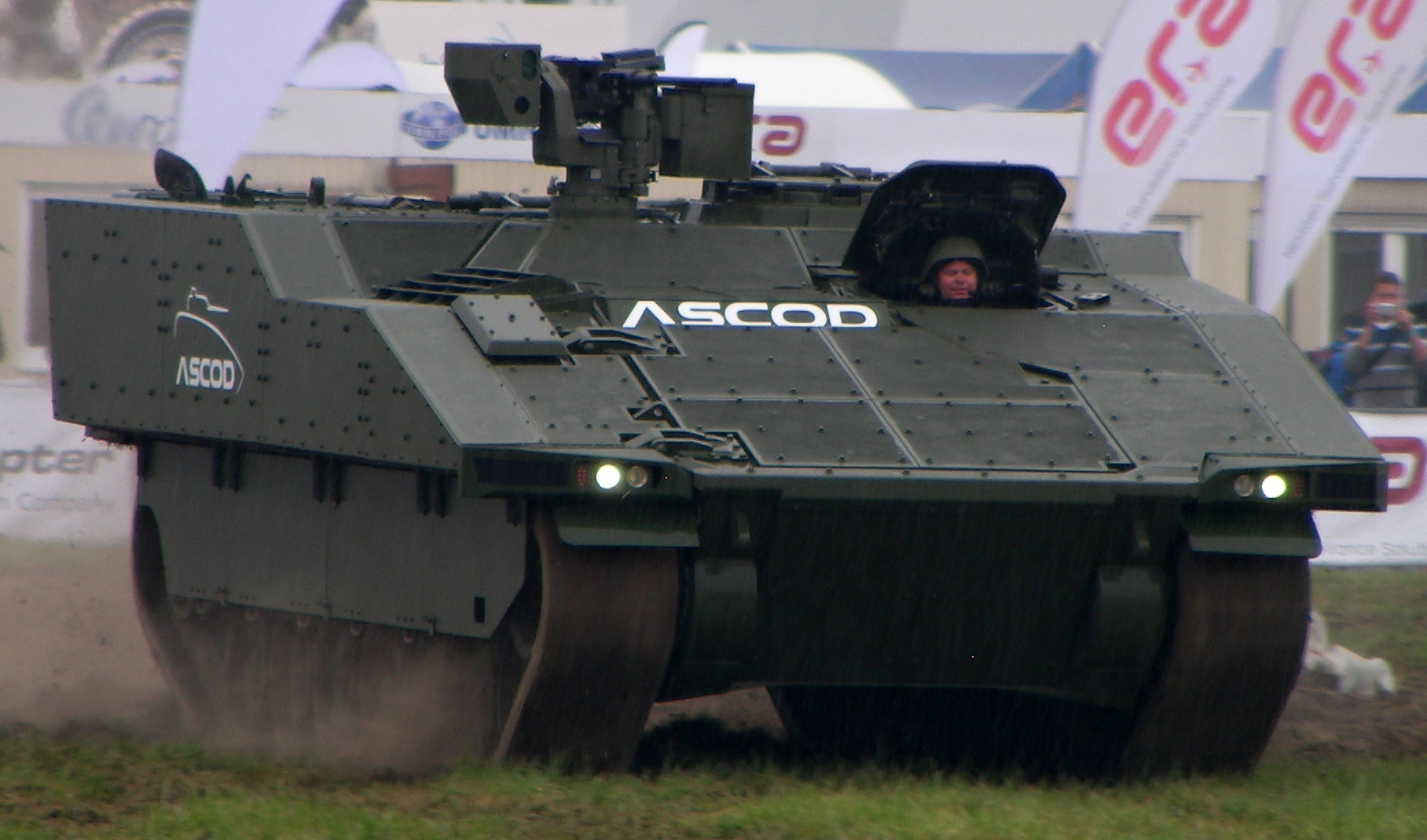
ASCOD 2, Spanish Army,
VAC

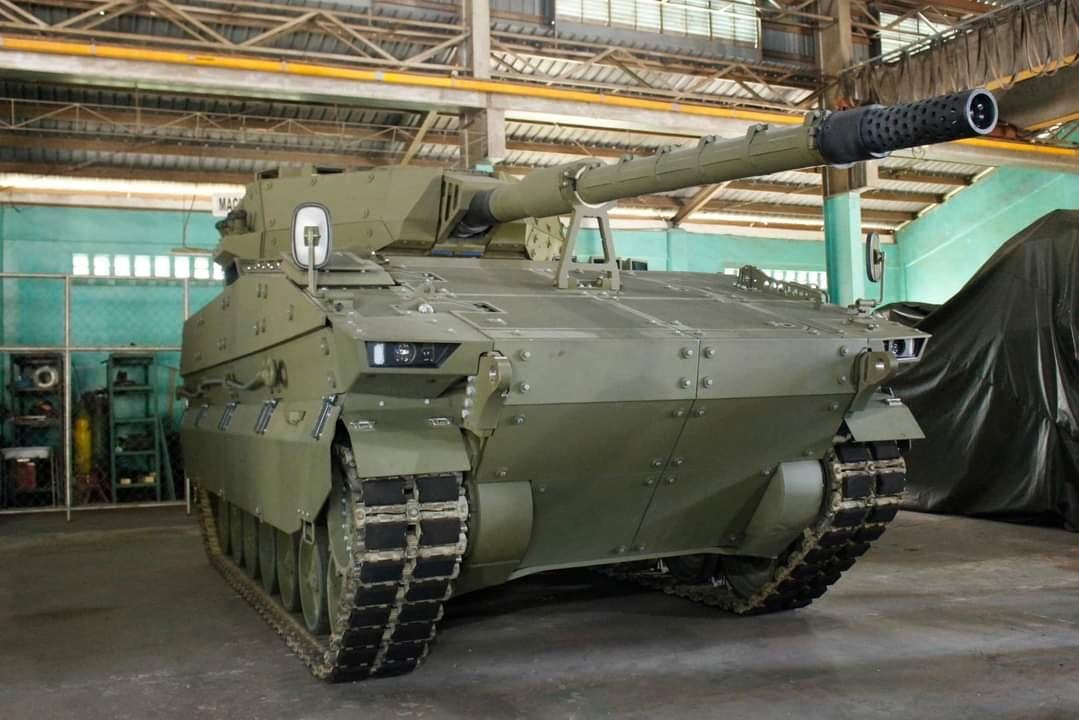
ASCOD 2 tank, Philippine Army,
Sabrah light tank

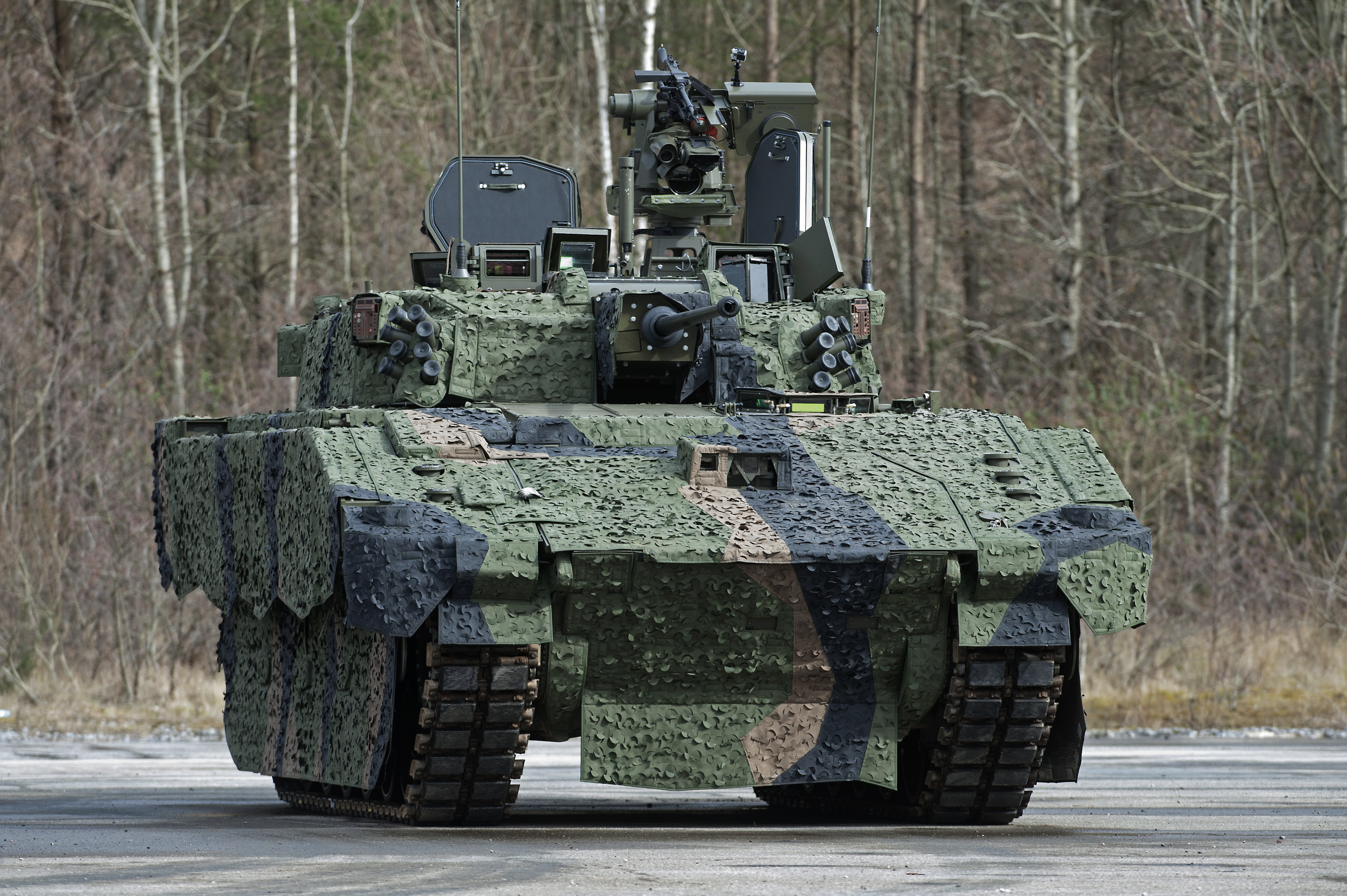
Scout SV, British Army,
AJAX, an IFV

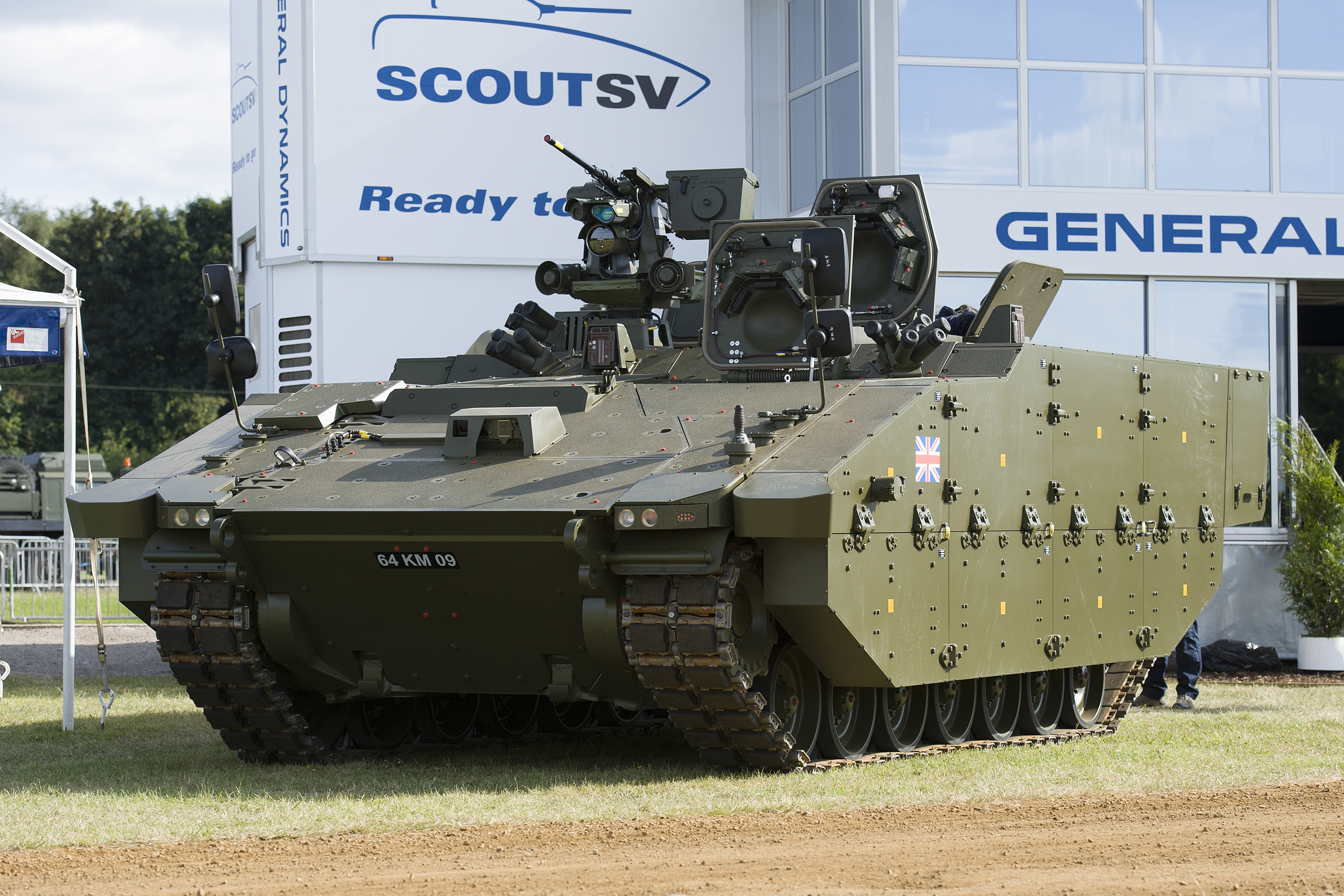
Scout SV, British Army,
ARES, an APC

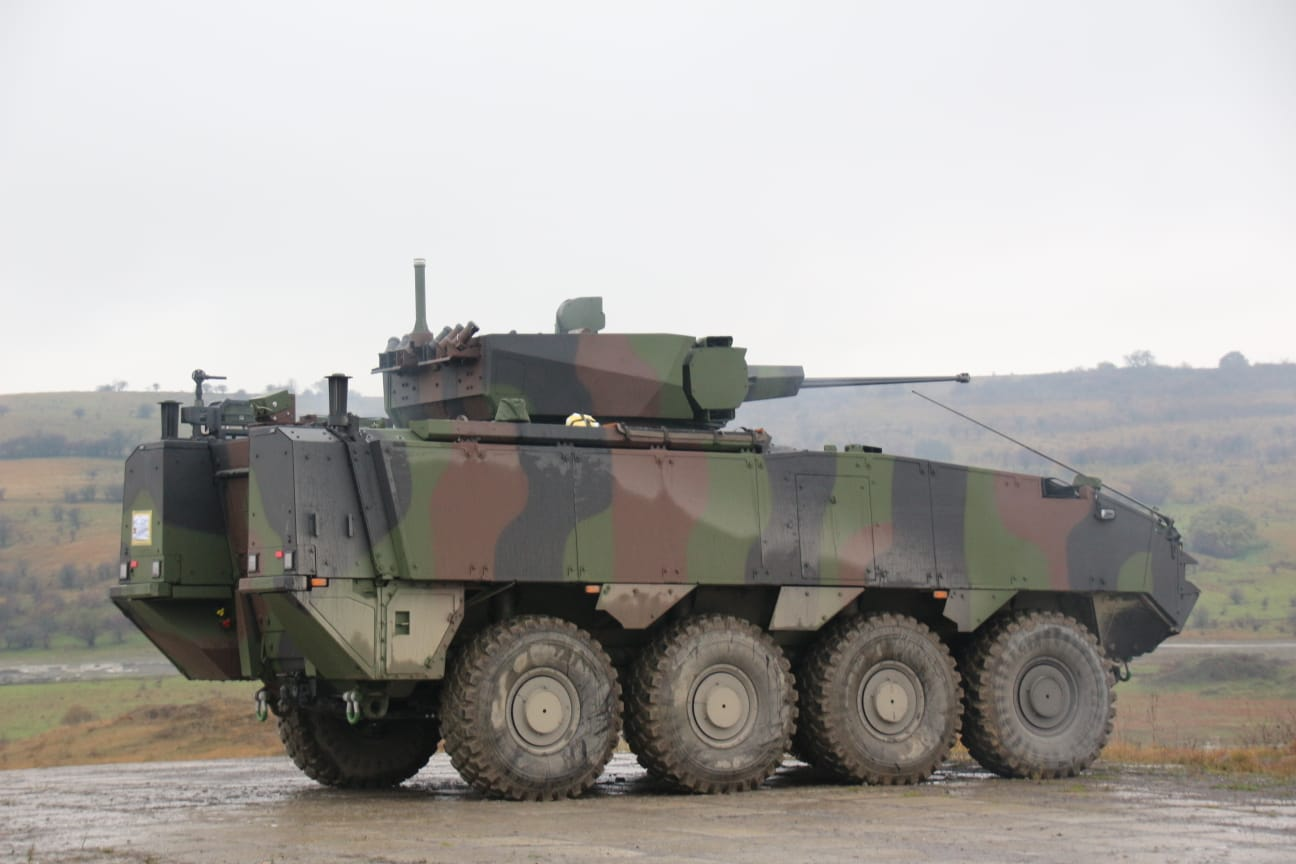
Piranha V, Spanish Army,
Dragón VCR

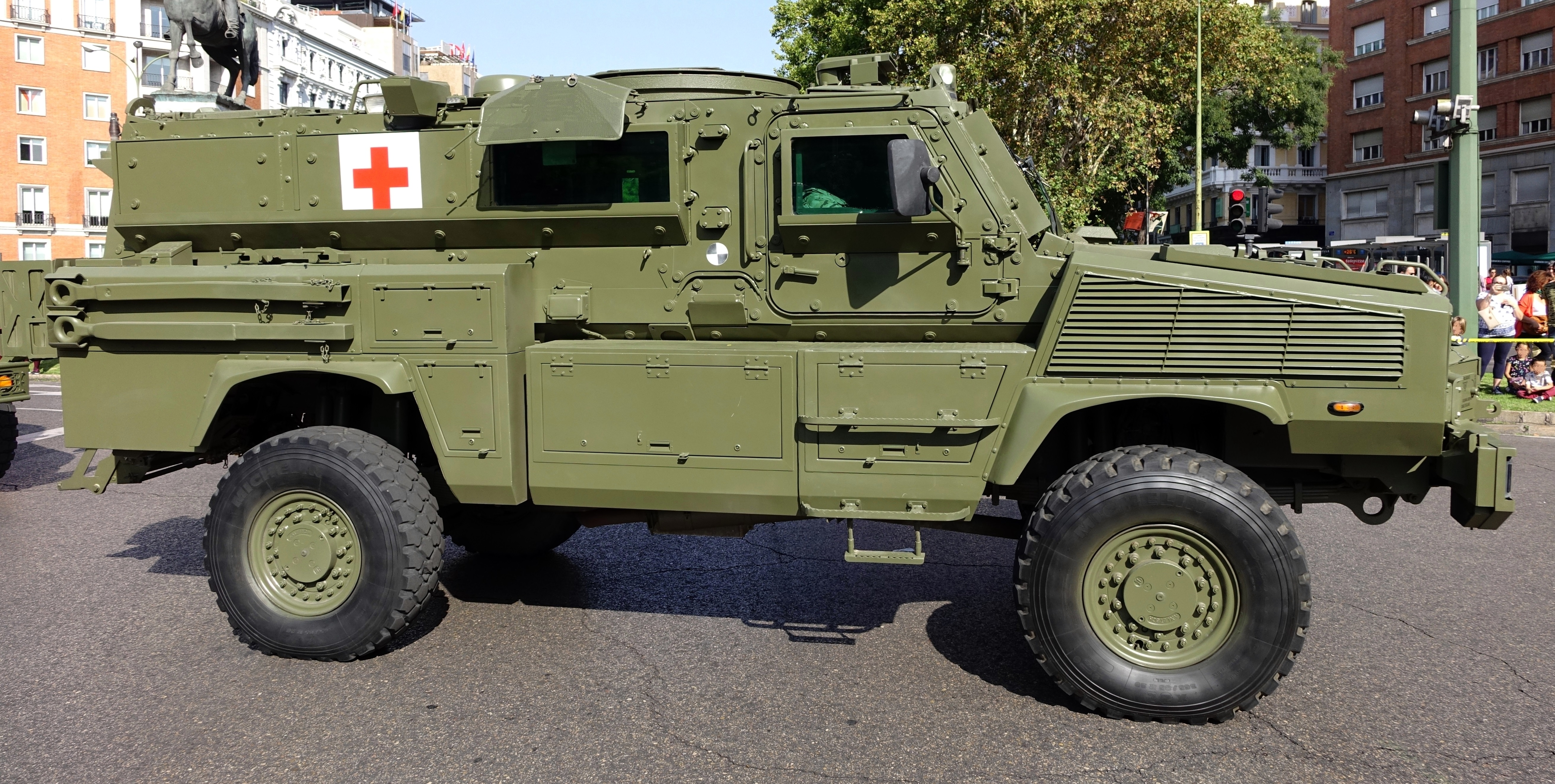
RG-31 Mk5E, Spanish Army,
Ambulancia

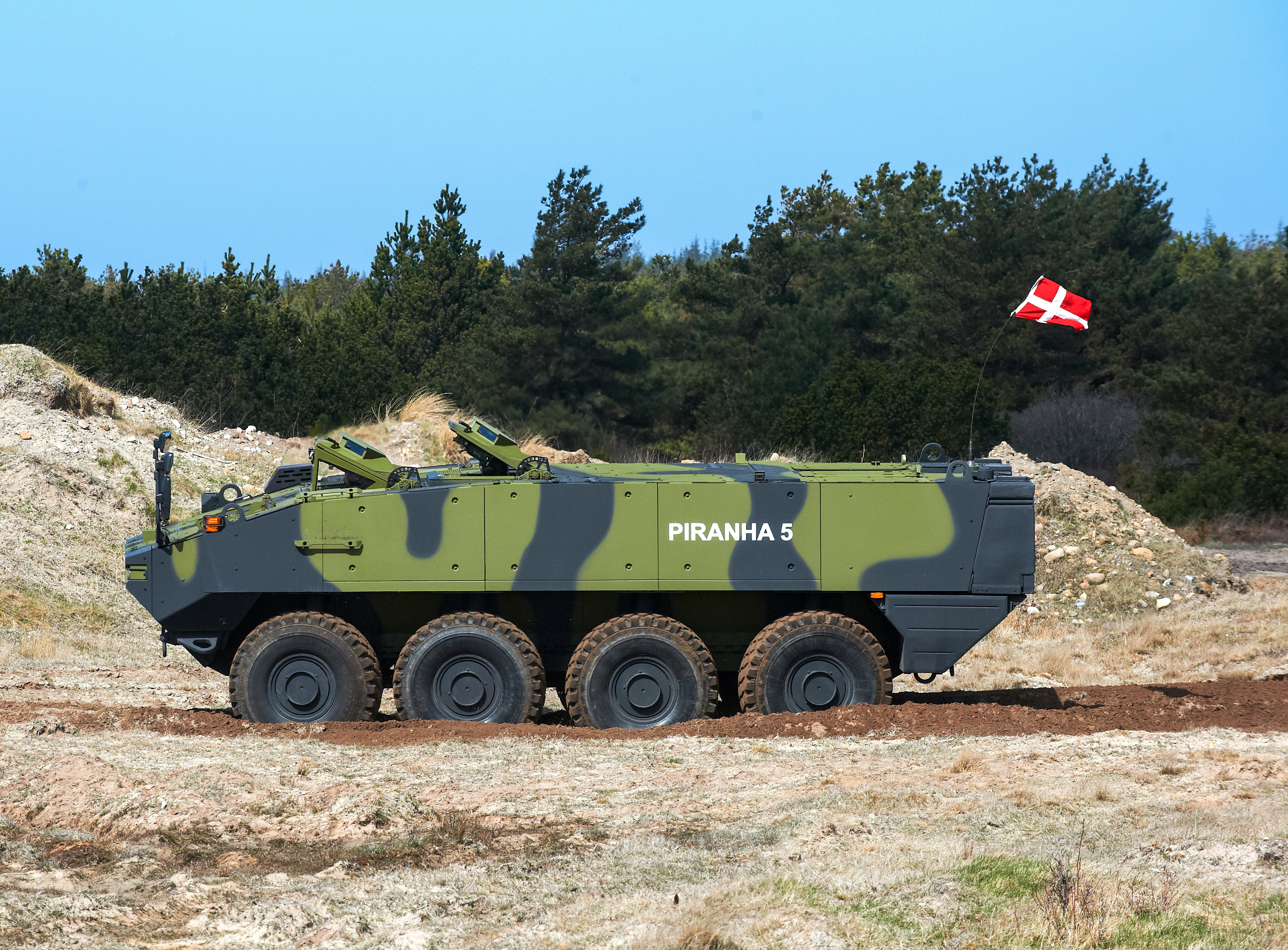
Piranha V, Danish Army

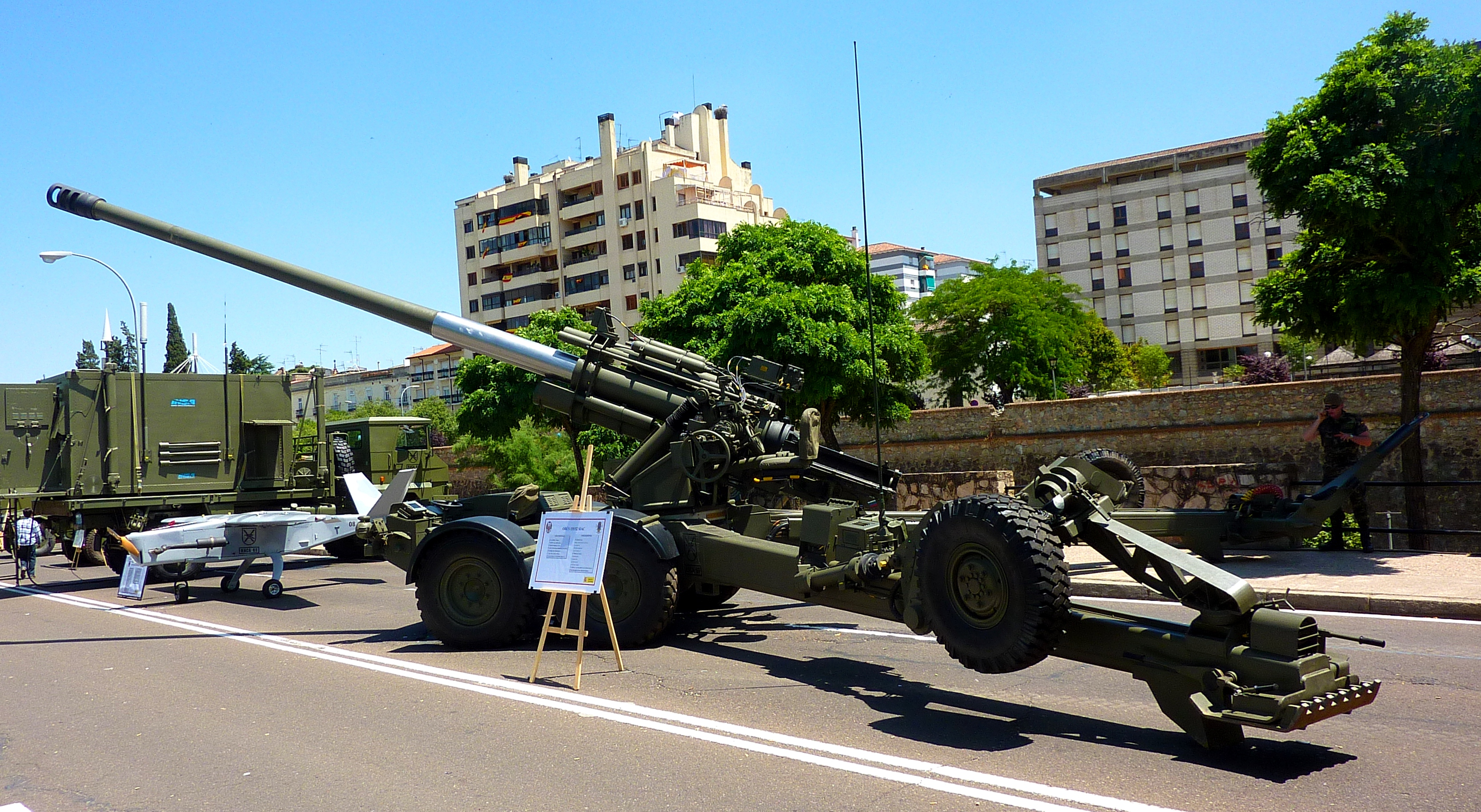
Santa Bárbara Sistemas 155/52, Spanish Army,
SBS 155/52 APU-SIAC

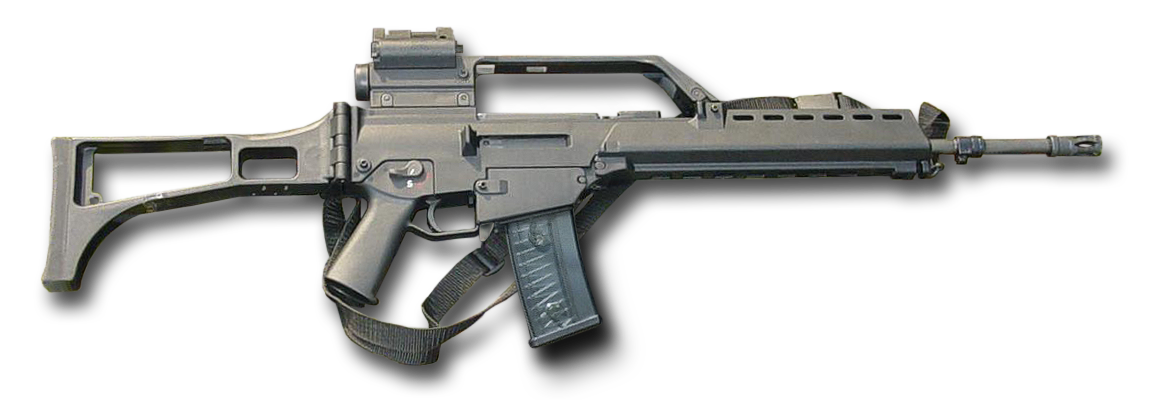
H&K G36E, Spanish Army

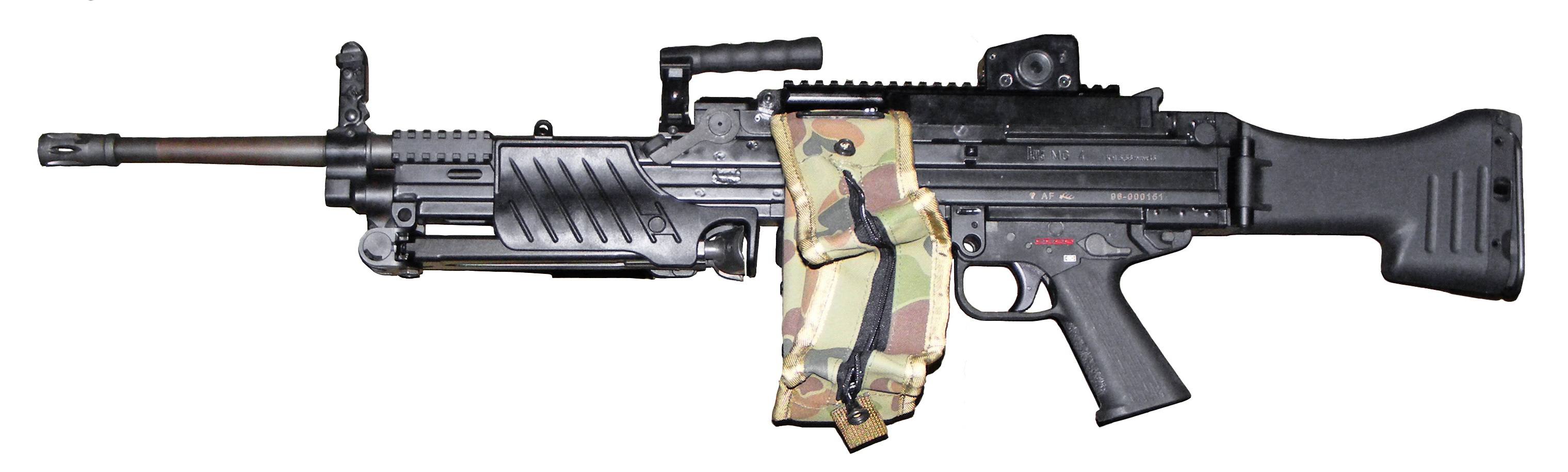
H&K MG4, Spanish Army

Meteor missile, Spanish Army

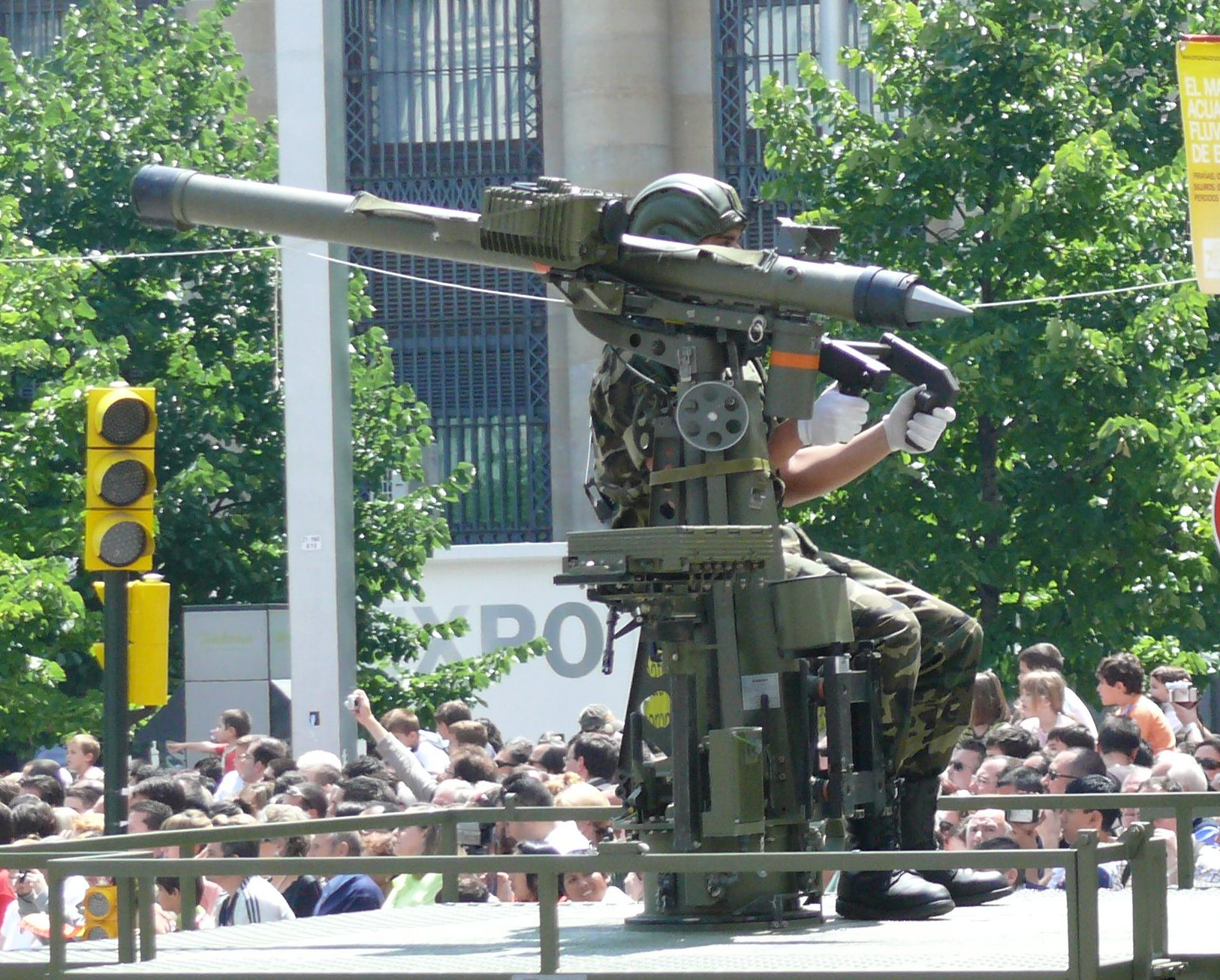
Mistral missile, Spanish Army

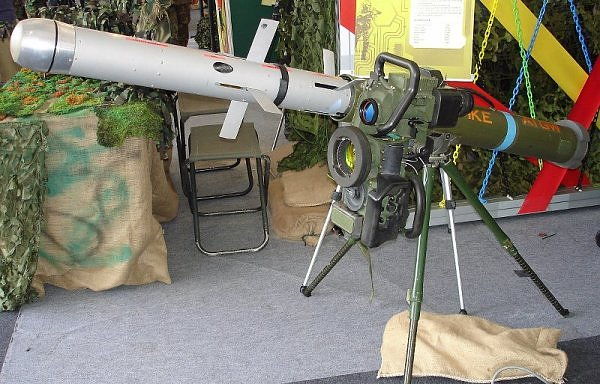
Spike missile, Spanish Army
