= William Ballhaus =

William Ballhaus may refer to:

- William F. Ballhaus Sr. (1918–2013), American engineer
- William F. Ballhaus Jr. (born 1945), American engineer
- William L. Ballhaus (born c. 1967), American businessman
