= General Dynamics =

American defense manufacturing conglomerate

General Dynamics Corporation

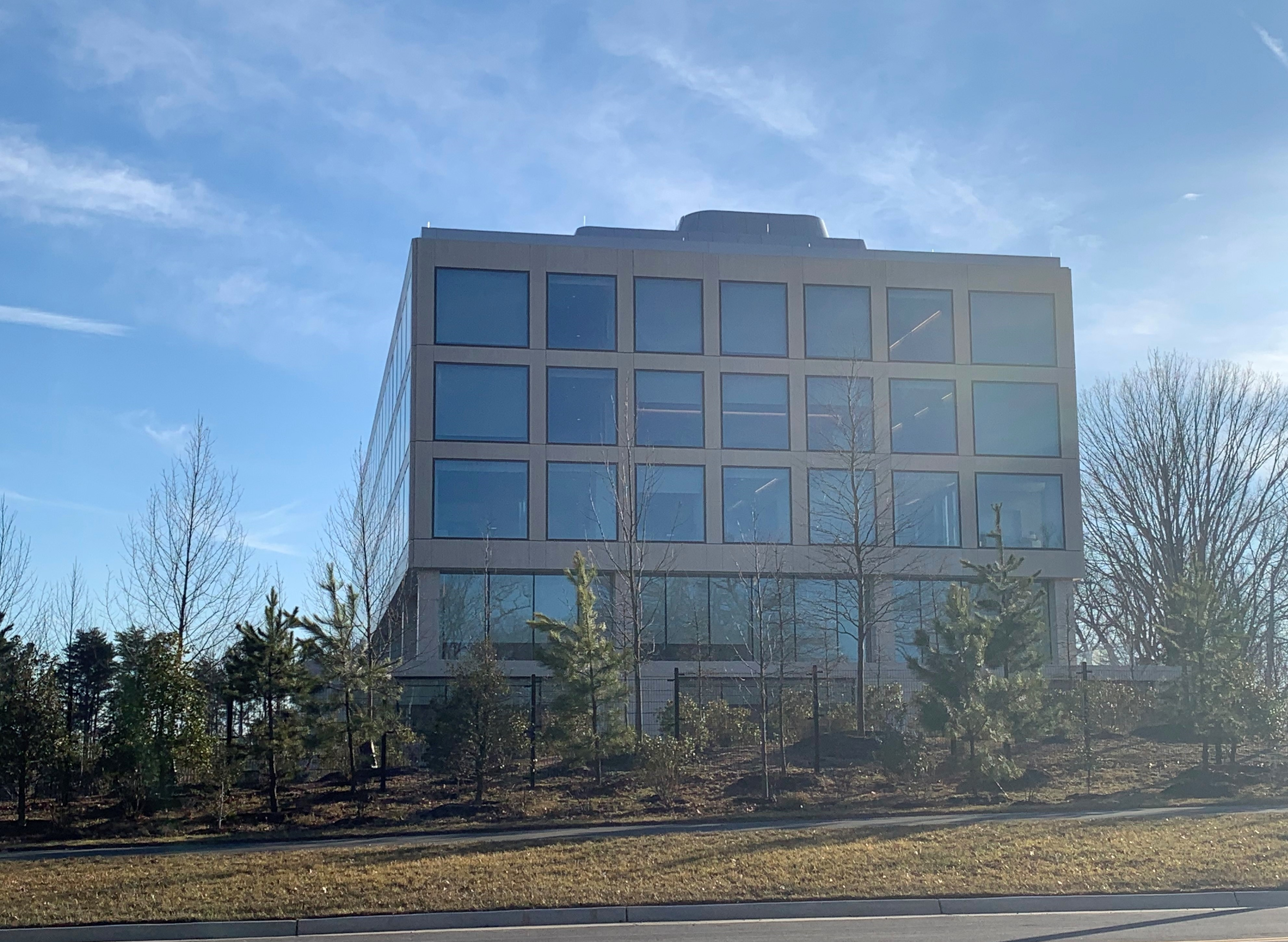
- Headquarters of General Dynamics in February 2021
- Type: Public
- Traded as: NYSE: GD; S&P 100 component; S&P 500 component
- Industry: Arms industry; Shipbuilding
- Founded: 1952; 74 years ago
- Founder: John Jay Hopkins
- Headquarters: Reston, Virginia, United States
- Area served: Worldwide
- Key people: Phebe Novakovic (chairman and CEO); Danny Deep (President)
- Products: Aircraft flight control systems; Auxiliary ships; Business jets; Combat vehicles; Communications systems; IT systems; Jones Act ships; Ammunition; Nuclear submarine; Stealth ships; Tanks; Vision Systems; Watercraft; Weapon systems
- Services: Artificial intelligence; Charter Services; Command and control; Cybersecurity; Fixed-base operator (FBO); Intelligence services; IT; IT service management; Maintenance, repair, and overhaul (MRO); Naval design; Shipbuilding; Ship repair; Software development
- Revenue: ▲US$52.6 billion (2025)
- Operating income: ▲US$5.36 billion (2025)
- Net income: ▲US$4.21 billion (2025)
- Total assets: ▲US$57.2 billion (2025)
- Total equity: ▲US$25.6 billion (2025)
- Number of employees: 117,000 (2025)
- Divisions: Aerospace; Marine Systems; Combat Systems; Technologies
- Subsidiaries: Bath Iron Works; General Dynamics Electric Boat; General Dynamics Information Technology; General Dynamics Land Systems; General Dynamics Mission Systems; General Dynamics UK; Gulfstream; Jet Aviation; MOWAG; NASSCO
- Website: gd.com

General Dynamics Corporation (GD) is an American industrial and technology company based in Reston, Virginia. It is primarily a developer and producer of advanced military equipment of a wide variety, such as nuclear submarines, main battle tanks, and armoured fighting vehicles. It is also the manufacturer of the civilian aviation Gulfstream business jets and a provider of information technology services. The company is the 3rd largest of the top 100 contractors of the U.S. federal government; it receives over 3% of total spending by the federal government of the United States on contractors.

The company is ranked 96th on the Fortune 100 and 242nd on the Forbes Global 2000. In 2024, 69% of revenue was from the federal government of the United States, 14% was from U.S. commercial customers, 10% was from non-U.S. government customers and 7% was from non-U.S. commercial customers.

The company was formed in 1952 via the merger of submarine manufacturer Electric Boat and aircraft manufacturer Canadair. For many years, General Dynamics manufactured military aircraft, both via its Convair subsidiary and on its own. Some of the most well-known weapons systems manufactured by General Dynamics include the M1 Abrams main battle tank and the Stryker armored fighting vehicle; the F-111 fighter-bomber and F-16 fighter aircraft; and the Los Angeles-class and Virginia-class nuclear-powered attack submarines and the Ohio-class and Columbia-class nuclear-powered ballistic missile submarines.

== History ==
=== 1899–1920 ===
Isaac Leopold Rice bought the Holland Torpedo Boat Company from John Philip Holland in 1899. Holland continued to work at the company as chief engineer and the company was renamed Electric Boat Company. Electric Boat was responsible for designing and building the USS Holland, purchased by the United States Navy in 1900 for $150,000 (roughly $5.75M in 2025).

Electric Boat also sold modified Holland-class and Plunger-class submarines to the British Royal Navy through the English armaments company Vickers as well as to Japan and Russia. In 1906, Electric Boat won contracts to design C-class submarines but subcontracted the construction to the Fore River Shipyard in Quincy, Massachusetts.

When Holland died in 1914, Lawrence Spear (who replaced him as chief engineer) redesigned the Holland submarine. The redesign replaced the submarine's observation dome with a conning tower, a periscope, and first-of-its-kind torpedo tubes.

In 1911, Electric Boat acquired the New London Ship and Engine Company in Groton, Connecticut, to build parts for submarines, diesel engines, and commercial ships. Isaac Rice died in 1915 and was replaced by his associate Henry Carse. Carse expanded the company with the purchase of several companies, including Electro Dynamics, Elco Motor Yacht, and New London Ship & Engine of Groton, Connecticut. Following the acquisitions, the company was renamed Submarine Boat Corporation. During World War I, the company received orders from the U.S. Navy to build 85 submarines, 722 submarine chasers, and 118 surface ships.

=== 1921–1940 ===
In 1924, the Peruvian government ordered two submarines built at the New London Ship & Engine shipyard in Groton, Connecticut. In 1925, Carse reorganized the company, emphasized production of surface ships, and brought back the Electric Boat Company. In 1933, Electric Boat expanded its presence in Groton, Connecticut, by acquiring a second shipyard to build submarines. The USS Cuttlefish was the first submarine built at the Groton Shipyard. In the early 1930s, the U.S. government placed orders for submarines and PT (patrol/torpedo) boats from Electric Boat facilities at Groton and the Elco plant in New Jersey, respectively. Lawrence Spear retired in 1937, replaced by John Jay Hopkins. Hopkins led the company's strong re-emergence as a shipbuilder in World War II.

=== 1941–1960 ===
During World War II, Electric Boat and its Elco Yacht and Electro Dynamic subsidiaries mobilized full-capacity production. The sudden production expansion led to a labor shortage, and women filled the open jobs as welders and riveters. During World War II, Electric Boat produced 74 submarines and 398 PT boats. When the war ended in 1945, the Navy reduced its orders for new vessels, and the company reduced its workforce from 13,000 to 4,000.

Electric Boat diversified at the end of WWII, so John Jay Hopkins acquired the Canadian government-owned Canadair for $10 million in 1946. The factory alone was worth more than $22 million, according to the Canadian government's calculations, excluding the value of the remaining contracts for planes or spare parts. However, Canadair's production line and inventory systems were in disorder when Electric Boat purchased the company. Hopkins hired Canadian-born mass-production specialist H. Oliver West to take over the president's role and return Canadair to profitability. Shortly after the takeover, Canadair began delivering its new Canadair North Star (a version of the Douglas DC-4) and was able to deliver aircraft to Trans-Canada Airlines, Canadian Pacific Airlines, and British Overseas Airways Corporation (BOAC) well in advance of their contracted delivery times.

Defense spending increased with the onset of the Cold War, and Canadair went on to win many Canadian military contracts for the Royal Canadian Air Force and became a major aerospace company. These included Canadair CT-133 Silver Star trainer, the Canadair Argus long-range maritime reconnaissance and transport aircraft, and the Canadair F-86 Sabre. Between 1950 and 1958, 1,815 Sabres were built. Canadair also produced 200 CF-104 Starfighter supersonic fighter aircraft, a license-built version of the Lockheed F-104.

In 1951, the company was awarded the contract to build the world's first nuclear-powered submarine, the USS Nautilus (SSN571). The submarine was launched in 1954.

Aircraft production became increasingly important at Canadair, and Hopkins argued that the name "Electric Boat" was no longer appropriate. In 1952, Hopkins reorganized Electric Boat as a holding company, General Dynamics Corporation, with Electric Boat and Canadair as major subsidiaries.

In 1953, Electric Boat purchased Convair from the Atlas Corporation. The sale was approved by government oversight with the provision that the former would continue to operate out of Air Force Plant 4 in Fort Worth, Texas. This factory had been set up in order to spread out strategic aircraft production, and it was rented to Convair during the war to produce B-24 Liberator bombers. On April 29, 1954, the merger between Electric Boat and Convair became official and the company was named General Dynamics.

Convair worked as an independent division inside General Dynamics and, over the next decade, developed the F-106 Delta Dart interceptor, the B-58 Hustler bomber, and the Convair 880 and 990 airliners. Convair also developed the Atlas missile, the U.S.'s first operational intercontinental ballistic missile. Convair led the development of the American nuclear aircraft program, which the Pentagon enthusiastically supported. CEO Hopkins was a strong advocate of nuclear power and its numerous applications, but the nuclear airplane, or 'N-bomber,' was later found to be impractical, and the project was abandoned. The division would also become a significant contributor to the American space program.

In the late 1950s, General Dynamics hired Erik Nitsche as a graphic designer to develop corporate reports and advertising material designs, including the "Atoms for Peace" series of posters for the 1955 International Conference on Peaceful Uses of Atomic Energy in Geneva, Switzerland. These designs have become iconic examples of the mid-century modernist graphic design style.

In 1957, Hopkins fell seriously ill and was replaced by Frank Pace later that year. John Naish succeeded Joseph McNarney as president of Convair. In the same year, General Dynamics purchased Liquid Carbonic Corporation in September 1957 and controlled it as a wholly owned subsidiary.

In 1959, the U.S. Navy commissioned Electric Boat to design and build the first fleet ballistic-missile submarine, USS George Washington (SSBN598). The George Washington-class ballistic missile submarines were derived from the Skipjack-class submarine design, with a 130-foot missile compartment inserted between the control and reactor sections. The USS George Washington (SSBN-598) was initially laid down as the Skipjack-class USS Scorpion (SSN-589), but was repurposed during construction to accommodate the Polaris missile system. Materials from other planned attack submarines, including USS Sculpin (SSN-590), were also reallocated to the program.

The same year, Chicago industrialist Henry Crown became the company's largest shareholder and merged his Material Service Corporation with General Dynamics in 1959. General Dynamics subsequently reorganized into Eastern Group in New York City and Western Group in San Diego, California, with the latter taking over all of the aerospace activities. This separated the branding between Convair-manufactured product types, with defense and space phased out the Convair brand name which rebranded those as simply General Dynamics to present the latter's status as a prime contractor to the U.S. government being the only customer and user of those while commercial ones and Convair-related artist conceptions retain the brand. The board decided to build all future planes in Fort Worth, Texas, ending plane production at Convair's original plant in San Diego, California, but continuing with space and missile development there.

=== 1961–1980 ===
In 1961, Secretary of Defense Robert McNamara initiated the Tactical Fighter Experimental (TFX) program to develop a single aircraft design for the Air Force, Navy, and Marine Corps. General Dynamics and Boeing were selected to submit updated designs. McNamara selected General Dynamics' proposal due to the greater commonality between its versions. The Boeing aircraft shared less than half of the major structural components. The F-111's design pioneered variable-sweep wings, after-burning turbofan engines, and automated terrain-following radar for low-level, high-speed flight. General Dynamics continued to develop its version of the F-111 at the former Convair facility in Fort Worth, Texas. The company built 563 F-111s.

In 1962, Roger Lewis was appointed Chairman and CEO of General Dynamics. In 1963, General Dynamics purchased the Quincy Shipbuilding Works from Bethlehem Steel. In 1965, General Dynamics reorganized into 12 operating divisions based on product lines. In 1967, Electric Boat launched the USS Sturgeon (SSN637), the lead ship in the Sturgeon class of attack submarines. In 1970, the board replaced Roger Lewis with former McDonnell Douglas president David S. Lewis as Chief Executive Officer. David S. Lewis relocated the company headquarters to St. Louis, Missouri, in 1971. Later that year, Electric Boat and Newport News Shipbuilding were awarded contracts to co-manufacture the Los Angeles-class submarines. In 1972, Electric Boat received contracts for the design and development of the Ohio-class ballistic missile submarine. Electric Boat also developed a new modular process to build the 560-foot submarines; the process remains the industry standard. Construction of the flagship Los Angeles-class attack submarine began the same year. In 1973, General Dynamics established the Quonset Point Facility in North Kingstown, Rhode Island, to provide off-site manufacturing support for the Groton facility. Production began the following year.

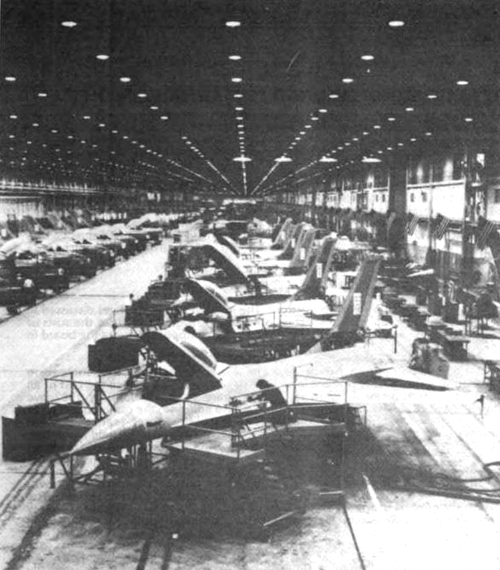
The F-16 production line in Fort Worth, Texas, c. 1986

The U.S. Air Force initiated the Lightweight Fighter (LWF) program to develop a new fighter aircraft that met the requirements of Major John Boyd's "energy-maneuverability" theory. General Dynamics organized its own version of Lockheed's Skunk Works, the Advanced Concepts Laboratory, and responded with a new aircraft design incorporating advanced technologies. General Dynamics submitted a design in 1972 for a new lightweight fighter, the YF-16. The YF-16 first flew in January 1974 and proved slightly better performance than the Northrop Grumman YF-17 in head-to-head testing. General Dynamics YF-16 was selected as the first Lightweight Fighter for the U.S. Air Force. It entered production as the F-16 Fighting Falcon in January 1975 with an initial order of 650 and 1,388. The F-16 also won contracts worldwide, beating the F-17 in foreign competition. General Dynamics built the F-16 at Air Force Plant 4 in Fort Worth, Texas, near Carswell Air Force Base, to fulfill the contracts. F-16 orders eventually totaled more than 4,600, making it the company's largest aircraft program. Peak production took place in the late 1980s, when some 30,000 General Dynamics workers turned out an F-16 a day.

In 1975, General Dynamics Electric Boat broke ground on a land-level submarine construction facility in Groton, Connecticut. In 1976, General Dynamics sold the struggling Canadair back to the Canadian government for $38 million.

=== 1981–2000 ===
In 1980, Electric Boat’s automated frame and cylinder facility at Quonset Point became fully operational. The automated frame and cylinder facility enabled the modular construction of nuclear-powered submarines.

When General Dynamics purchased Chrysler Defense, Inc., the division was renamed General Dynamics Land Systems.

In 1985, a further reorganization created the Space Systems Division from the Convair Space Division. Later that year, the company also acquired Cessna. In 1986, the General Dynamics Quincy Shipbuilding Division was closed.

Henry Crown, still General Dynamics's largest shareholder, died on August 15, 1990. After his death, the company began rapidly divesting its underperforming divisions under CEO William Anders. The company divested Data Systems Division, Cessna, its Electronics Division, and Missile Division.

In 1991, Electric Boat was awarded the contract to build the second Seawolf submarine (SSN 22), later named Connecticut. Cessna was re-sold to Textron in January 1992, the San Diego and Pomona missile production units were sold to General Motors-Hughes Aerospace in May 1992, the Fort Worth aircraft production to Lockheed in March 1993 (a nearby electronics production facility was separately sold to Israeli-based Elbit Systems, marking that company's entry into the US market), and its Space Systems Division to Martin Marietta in 1994. The remaining Convair Aircraft Structure unit was sold to McDonnell Douglas in 1994. The Convair Division was simply closed in 1996.

In July 1993 The Pentagon hosted a dinner, later dubbed the Last Supper, which was attended by representatives of 51 major United States defense contractors to discuss industry consolidation after the end of the Cold War. After the dinner, the industry consolidated into the "Big Five". By following the Pentagon’s directive to consolidate, General Dynamics focused its businesses on two specific areas, Land Systems (tanks) and Marine Systems (submarines). The company eventually became the sole provider for the M1 Abrams tank and one of only two primary builders of nuclear submarines.

In 1995, General Dynamics purchased the privately-held Bath Iron Works shipyard in Bath, Maine, for $300 million, diversifying its shipbuilding portfolio to include U.S. Navy surface ships such as guided-missile destroyers. In 1998, the company acquired NASSCO, formerly National Steel and Shipbuilding Company, for $415 million. The San Diego shipyard produces U.S. Navy auxiliary and support ships as well as commercial ships that are eligible to be U.S.-flagged under the Jones Act.

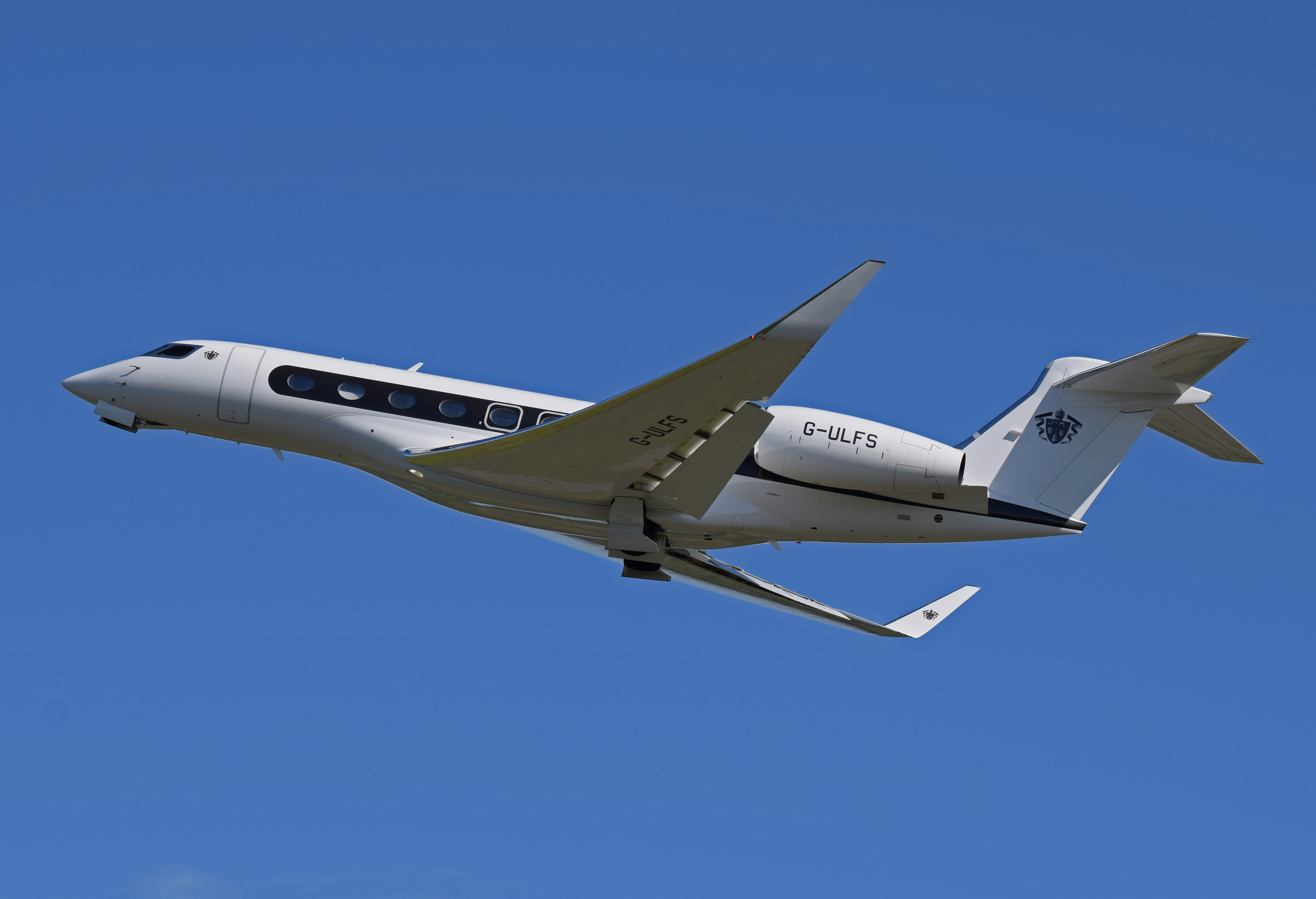
In 1999, the company had acquired Gulfstream Aerospace. Here, a Gulfstream G650 departs Bristol Airport, England, in 2014.

In 1997, General Dynamics acquired Computing Devices Ltd based in Hastings, England, which had developed avionics and mission systems for the Panavia Tornado, British Aerospace Harrier II and Hawker Siddeley Nimrod. In 2001, Computing Devices Canada (CDC) was awarded a contract from the UK Ministry of Defence to supply tactical communication systems for their Bowman program. The work for this was carried out at its new UK headquarters in Oakdale, Wales, and the company was renamed General Dynamics UK Limited. As of 2020, it comprises two business units: General Dynamics Land Systems – UK and General Dynamics Mission Systems – UK and operates in eight sites across the United Kingdom. It is currently responsible for delivering the General Dynamics Ajax family of armored vehicles, the Foxhound light protected patrol vehicle and the Morpheus communications system to the UK Ministry of Defence.

In 1999, General Dynamics expanded beyond its defense industry focus with the acquisition of Gulfstream Aerospace, stabilizing its income with the commercial aviation business.

=== 2001–2020 ===
In 2001, the company purchased Spain’s Santa Barbara Sistemas, part of broader expansion into the European market. In 2003, the company acquired the Austrian vehicle manufacturer Steyr-Daimler-Puch Spezialfahrzeug, adding it to the newly established General Dynamics European Land Systems business unit.

Senator Debbie Stabenow with employees at General Dynamics Land Systems in Michigan in 2014

In 2003, General Dynamics purchased the defense divisions of General Motors, adding them to the General Dynamics Land Systems business unit. Having divested itself of its aviation holdings, GD had concentrated on land and sea products. GD had purchased Chrysler's defense divisions in 1982, renaming them General Dynamics Land Systems. In 2003, it purchased the defense divisions of General Motors as well. It became a major supplier of armored vehicles of all types, including the M1 Abrams, LAV 25, Stryker, and a wide variety of vehicles based on these chassis.

In 2004, General Dynamics bid for the UK company Alvis plc, the leading British manufacturer of armored vehicles. In March the board of Alvis Vickers voted in favor of the £309m takeover. However at the last minute BAE Systems offered £355m for the company. This deal was finalized in June 2004.

In 2008, General Dynamics acquired Jet Aviation, becoming a business unit within the company. In the same year, General Dynamics resolved claims that its General Dynamics Armament and Technical Products subsidiary fraudulently billed the government for parts used in Navy and Air Force aircraft and submarines, and agreed to settle the charges by paying $4 million to the US government. On August 19, 2008, GD agreed to pay $4 million to settle a lawsuit brought by the US Government claiming that a GD unit fraudulently billed the government for defectively manufactured parts used in US military aircraft and submarines. The US alleged that GD defectively manufactured or failed to test parts used in US military aircraft from September 2001 to August 2003, such as for the C-141 Starlifter transport plane. The GD unit involved, based in Glen Cove, New York, had closed in 2004.

USS Virginia (SSN-774), lead ship of her class of nuclear-powered attack submarines, emerges at the General Dynamics Electric Boat shipyard in Groton, Connecticut, in 2003.

In 2010, the US Navy restarted the Arleigh Burke Class destroyer program. The ship's contract awards alternated between Bath Iron Works and Ingalls Shipbuilding. In the same year, the US Navy awarded Bath Iron Works all three ships in the DDG 1000 program.

Force Protection, Inc. was acquired by General Dynamics Land Systems in November 2011 for $350 million.

In 2013, Phebe N. Novakovic was promoted from chief operating officer to chair and chief executive officer.

A $10 billion deal with the Canadian Commercial Corporation was criticized by political opponents because of the Saudi Arabian-led intervention in Yemen. An article published by the digital magazine, Quartz, reported that since 2000, GDIT has provided services to the Department of Health and Human Services' Office of Refugee Resettlement, now as part of the Trump administration family separation policy.

In 2018, General Dynamics acquired information technology services company CSRA for $9.7 billion and merged the company into General Dynamics Information Technology (GDIT) (that subsidiary had been created in 2006 when Anteon International Corporation was combined with General Dynamics Network Systems). The CSRA acquisition allowed GDIT to expand information technology services to the Department of Defense, the intelligence community, and federal civilian agencies. In the same year, the U.S. Navy awarded 10 new contracts for Arleigh Burke-class destroyers from General Dynamics Bath Iron Works and Huntington Ingalls Industries.

General Dynamics has been accused by groups such as Code Pink and Green America of "making money from human suffering by profiting off the migrant children held at U.S. detention camps" due to its IT services contracts with the Department of Health and Human Services' Office of Refugee Resettlement, the government agency that operates shelters for unaccompanied children to include those separated from their families as part of the Trump administration family separation policy. The company says it has no role in constructing or operating detention centers, and that its contracts to provide training and technical services began in 2000 and have spanned across four presidential administrations.

It was announced in September 2018 that the U.S. Navy awarded contracts for 10 new Arleigh Burke-class destroyers from General Dynamics Bath Iron Works and Huntington Ingalls Industries.

Former U.S. Secretary of Defense General Jim Mattis re-joined the company's board of directors in August 2019. He had previously served on the board, but resigned and divested before becoming Secretary of Defense.

In 2020, Electric Boat began prototyping and advanced construction work of the first Columbia-class ballistic missile submarine.

Reuters reported the US Department of Defense contracted GDIT in spring 2020 to mid-2021 for "influence operations" to affect China's "vaccine diplomacy" in the Philippines, Central Asia, and the Middle East.

In September 2020, General Dynamics announced a strategic counter-drone partnership, providing General Dynamics' global network with access to Dedrone's complete drone detection and defeat technology.

In December 2020, the board of directors for General Dynamics announced a regular quarterly dividend of $1.10, payable on February 5, 2021.

On December 26, 2020, General Dynamics confirmed that their business division General Dynamics Land Systems was awarded a $4.6 billion contract by the U.S. Army for M1A2 SEPv3 Abrams main battle tanks.

=== 2021–present ===
In November 2021, Norway's KLP fund divested from General Dynamics, citing the production of depleted uranium munitions by General Dynamics Ordnance and Tactical Systems Inc. and General Dynamics Mission Systems' full life cycle support for strategic nuclear ballistic guidance and weapon control systems.

According to a report by Reuters, General Dynamics was the primary contractor for a United States military-run propaganda campaign to spread disinformation about the Sinovac Chinese COVID-19 vaccine, including using fake social media accounts to spread the disinformation that the Sinovac vaccine contained pork-derived ingredients and was therefore haram under Islamic law. The campaign primarily targeted people in the Philippines and used a social media hashtag for "China is the virus" in Tagalog. The campaign ran from the spring of 2020 to mid-2021. In 2024, General Dynamics IT was awarded a $493 million contract by The Pentagon. According to an unnamed source cited by Reuters, a military audit of General Dynamics's work on the project concluded that the company had engaged in sloppy tradecraft and took inadequate precautions to conceal the origins of the fake accounts created for the campaign.

General Dynamics' supply of weapons to Israel in the Gaza war has led to protests at facilities in Pittsfield, Massachusetts; Lincoln, Nebraska; Saco, Maine; New London, Connecticut; Red Lion, Pennsylvania;and Garland, Texas.

General Dynamics is the only company in the U.S. that makes the metal bodies of the MK-80 bomb series, the primary weapon type used in Israel's military campaign in Gaza. The MK-84, a munition within the MK-80 series, was reported to have been used by Israel against Palestinian civilians.

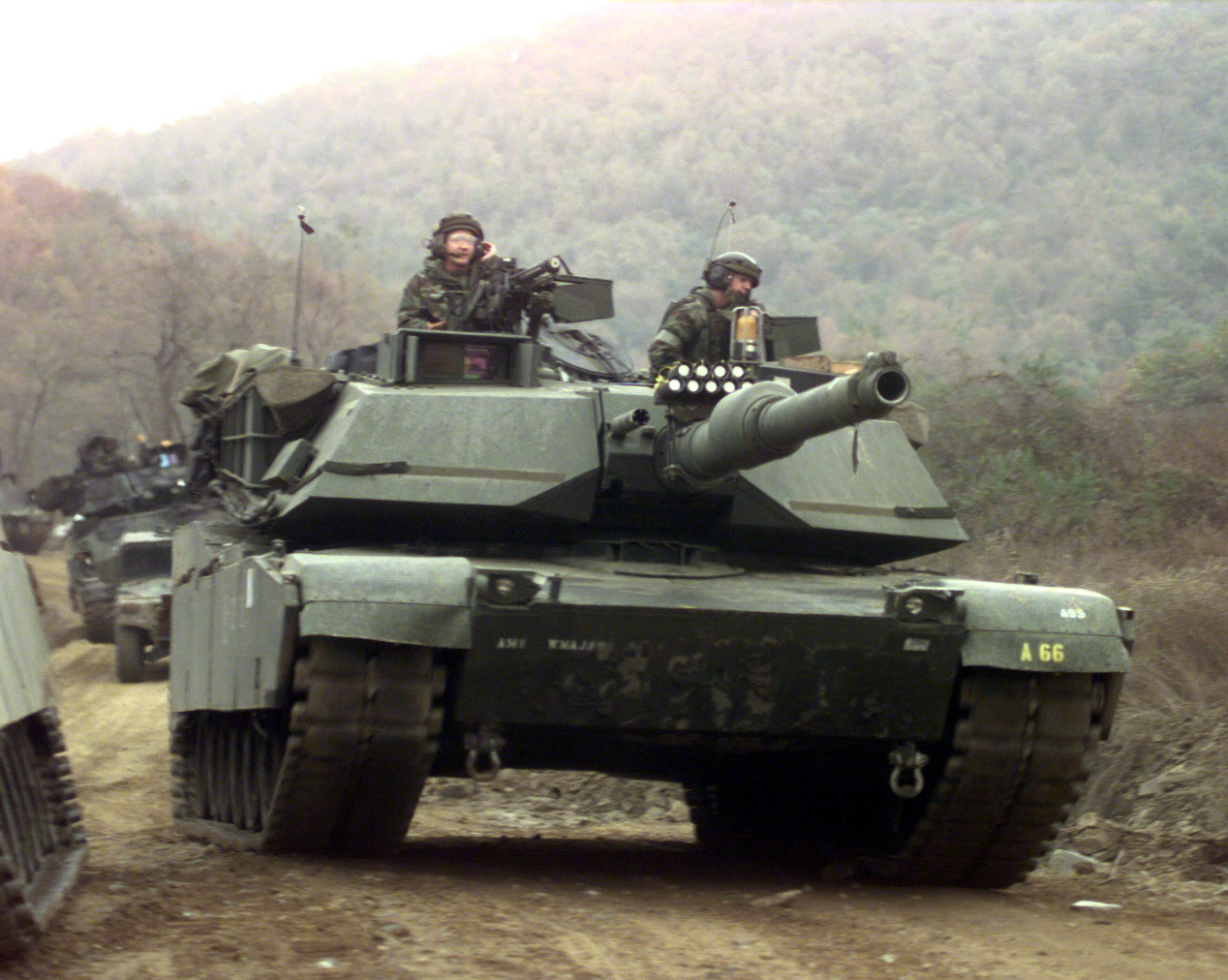
M1 Abrams

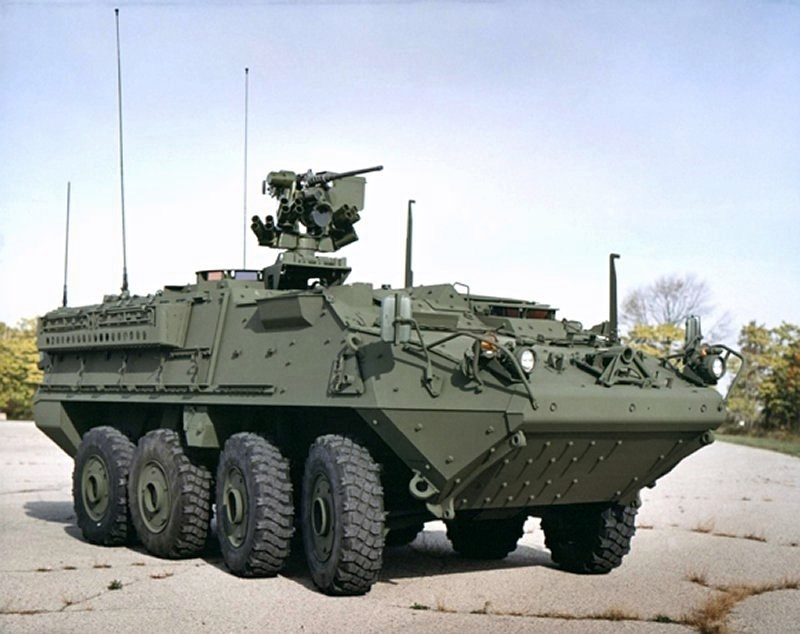
Stryker

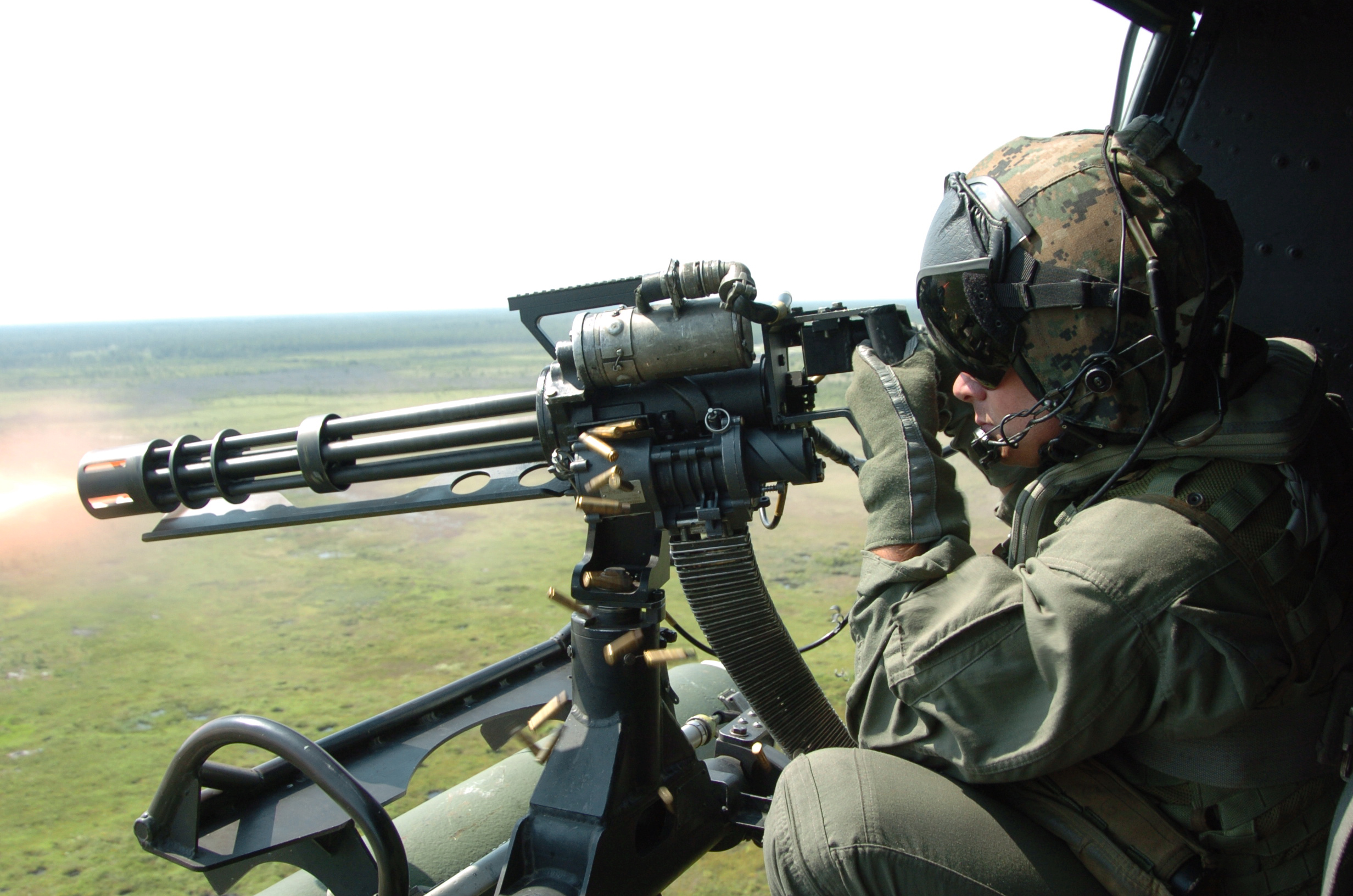
M134 Minigun

== Operations ==
The company's Gulfstream Aerospace division (23% of 2024 revenues) produces business jets including the Gulfstream G650/G700/G800 series and offers business aircraft services under Jet Aviation. The company's marine systems division (30% of 2024 revenues) designs and builds nuclear submarines and includes Bath Iron Works, General Dynamics Electric Boat, and National Steel and Shipbuilding Company. The company's combat systems division (19% of 2024 revenues) includes General Dynamics Land Systems, General Dynamics European Land Systems (GDELS), Steyr-Daimler-Puch, and Santa Bárbara Sistemas, and produces Phalanx CIWS, Expeditionary tanks, the M1 Abrams series main battle tank, Expeditionary Fighting Vehicles, M104 Wolverine, LAV III, Stryker armoured fighting vehicles, XM2001 Crusader self-propelled howitzer, GAU-17 (Minigun), GAU-19, ASCOD AFV, Pandur II, Mowag (including Mowag Duro, Mowag Eagle, and Mowag Piranha), Leopard 2E, and Scout SV. The company's technologies division (28% of 2024 revenues) includes General Dynamics Mission Systems and provides services such as consulting, mission-support, mobile communication, computers, command-and-control and cyber (C5) mission systems, and intelligence, surveillance and reconnaissance. It is modernizing the information technology systems of the United States Central Command and for the Centers for Medicare and Medicaid Services.

== Acquisitions timeline ==
=== 20th-century acquisitions ===
| Year | Acquisition | Business group |
|---|---|---|
| 1947 | Canadair | Aerospace |
| 1953 | Convair | Aerospace |
| 1955 | Stromberg-Carlson | Combat Systems |
| 1957 | Liquid Carbonic Corporation | Aerospace |
| 1959 | Material Service Corporation | |
| 1982 | Chrysler's combat systems | Combat Systems |
| 1995 | Bath Iron Works | Marine Systems |
| 1996 | Teledyne Vehicle Systems | Marine Systems |
| 1997 | Advanced Technology Systems | Combat Systems |
| 1997 | Lockheed Martin Defense Systems | Combat Systems |
| 1997 | Lockheed Martin Armament Systems | Combat Systems |
| 1997 | Computing Devices International | Technologies |
| 1998 | National Steel and Shipbuilding Company | Marine Systems |
| 1999 | Gulfstream Aerospace | Aerospace |
| 1999 | GTE Government Systems | Technologies |
| 2000 | Saco Defense | Combat Systems |

=== 21st-century acquisitions ===
| Year | Acquisition | Business group |
|---|---|---|
| 2001 | PrimeX Technologies Inc. | Technologies |
| 2001 | Motorola Integrated Systems | Technologies |
| 2001 | Galaxy Aerospace Company | Aerospace |
| 2001 | Santa Bárbara Sistemas | Combat Systems |
| 2002 | EWK Eisenwerke Kaiserslautern | Combat Systems |
| 2003 | GM Defense | Combat Systems |
| 2003 | Steyr-Daimler-Puch Spezialfahrzeug | Combat Systems |
| 2003 | Veridian and Digital Systems Resources | Technologies |
| 2003 | Datron's Intercontinental Manufacturing Company | Combat Systems |
| 2004 | Spectrum Astro | Aerospace |
| 2004 | MOWAG | Combat Systems |
| 2005 | MAYA Viz Ltd | Technologies |
| 2005 | Tadpole Computer | Technologies |
| 2005 | Itronix | Technologies |
| 2006 | FC Business Systems | Technologies |
| 2006 | Anteon International | Technologies |
| 2007 | Mediaware International | Technologies |
| 2008 | ViPS, Inc. | Technologies |
| 2008 | Jet Aviation | Aerospace |
| 2009 | Axletech International | Combat Systems |
| 2010 | Kylmar Ltd. | Combat Systems |
| 2011 | Vangent, Inc. | Technologies |
| 2011 | Metro Machine Imperial Docks Inc. | Marine Systems |
| 2011 | Force Protection Inc. | Combat Systems |
| 2012 | Earl Industries’ Ship Repair Division | Marine Systems |
| 2012 | Open Kernel Labs | Technologies |
| 2012 | Applied Physical Sciences | Aerospace |
| 2016 | Bluefin Robotics | Marine Systems |
| 2018 | CSRA Inc. | Technologies |
| 2018 | Hawker Pacific | Aerospace |
| 2018 | FWW Fahrzeugwerk GmbH | Combat Systems |

=== Divestitures ===
| Year | Divestiture | Purchaser |
|---|---|---|
| 1953 | Liquid Carbonic Corporation | Houston Natural Gas Co. |
| 1957 | Asbestos Corporation Limited | Société nationale de l'amiante (SNA) |
| 1967 | General Atomics | Gulf Oil |
| 1976 | Canadair | Canadian government |
| 1991 | Data Systems Division | Computer Sciences Corporation |
| 1995 | Tactical Missiles Division | Hughes Aircraft Company |
| 1992 | Cessna | Textron |
| 1992 | Electronics Division | The Carlyle Group |
| 1993 | Fort Worth Division (F-16s) | Lockheed Corporation |
| 1994 | Space Systems Division | Martin Marietta |
| 1994 | Convair's aerostructure unit | McDonnell Douglas |
| 2006 | Material Service | Hanson |
| 2007 | Freeman United Coal Mining Co. | Springfield Coal Co. |
| 2010 | Spacecraft development and manufacturing | Orbital Sciences Corporation |
| 2014 | Advanced Systems | MacDonald, Dettwiler and Associates |

== Corporate affairs ==
=== Corporate governance ===
General Dynamics current chairman and chief executive officer is Phebe Novakovic.

| Board Member | Role |
|---|---|
| Phebe Novakovic | Chairman and chief executive officer |
| James Crown | Lead Director |
| Rudy de Leon | Director |
| Cecil D. Haney | Director and chair, Nominating and Corporate Governance Committee |
| Mark M. Malcolm | Director |
| Jim Mattis | Director |
| C. Howard Nye | Director and chair, Audit Committee |
| Robert K. Steel | Director and chair, Sustainability Committee |
| Catherine B. Reynolds | Director and chair, Finance and Benefit Plans Committee |
| Laura J. Schumacher | Director and chair, Compensation Committee |
| John G. Stratton | Director |
| Peter A. Wall | Director |

As of December 2022.

=== Financials ===
| Year | Revenue in mil. US$ | Net income in mil. US$ | Assets in mil. US$ | Employees |
|---|---|---|---|---|
| 2005 | 20,975 | 1,461 | 19,700 | 72,200 |
| 2006 | 24,063 | 1,856 | 22,376 | 81,000 |
| 2007 | 27,240 | 2,072 | 25,733 | 83,500 |
| 2008 | 29,300 | 2,459 | 28,373 | 92,300 |
| 2009 | 31,981 | 2,394 | 31,077 | 91,700 |
| 2010 | 32,466 | 2,624 | 32,545 | 90,000 |
| 2011 | 32,677 | 2,526 | 34,883 | 95,100 |
| 2012 | 30,992 | −332 | 34,309 | 92,200 |
| 2013 | 30,930 | 2,357 | 35,494 | 96,000 |
| 2014 | 30,852 | 2,533 | 35,337 | 99,500 |
| 2015 | 31,781 | 3,036 | 31,997 | 99,900 |
| 2016 | 30,561 | 2,572 | 33,172 | 98,800 |
| 2017 | 30,973 | 2,912 | 35,046 | 98,600 |
| 2018 | 36,193 | 3,345 | 45,408 | 105,600 |
| 2019 | 39,350 | 3,484 | 49,349 | 102,900 |
| 2020 | 37,925 | 3,167 | 51,308 | 100,700 |
| 2021 | 38,469 | 3,257 | 50,073 | 103,100 |
| 2022 | 39,407 | 3,390 | 51,585 | 106,500 |

As of January 2023.

=== Carbon emissions ===
General Dynamics reported Total CO2e emissions (Direct + Indirect) for 2021 at 696,118 mt (-8.7% year over year) and aims to reducing greenhouse gas emissions 40% by 2034. The company is on track to become carbon neutral before 2060.

General Dynamics's annual total CO2e Emissions (in Metric Tons)
| 2014 | 2015 | 2016 | 2017 | 2018 | 2019 | 2020 | 2021 |
|---|---|---|---|---|---|---|---|
| 901,666 | 817,293 | 821,773 | 784,264 | 794,161 | 762,200 | 696,118 | 681,454 |

=== Company demographics ===
In 2021, General Dynamics's U.S. workforce was 21% veterans, 23% female, and 27% people of color. The US Department of Labor awarded the company the 2021 HIRE Vets Gold Award. The company has 26 Employee Resource Groups serving 10 employee segments. Approximately 20% of the company's employees are represented by labor unions such as International Association of Machinists and Aerospace Workers (IAM), The International Union, and United Auto Workers (UAW). Independent research published by American Association of People with Disabilities (AAPD), U.S. Department of Labor, Military Times, U.S. Veterans Magazine, Professional Women's Magazine, Forbes, and Fortune selected General Dynamics as a top employer. General Dynamics' community contributions in 2021 were 70% in Education & Social Services, 18% in Arts & Culture, and 12% in Service Member Support.

== See also ==
- Top 100 Contractors of the U.S. federal government
- List of companies headquartered in Northern Virginia
- List of military aircraft of the United States
- List of United States defense contractors
- List of current ships of the United States Navy
- List of currently active United States military land vehicles
- List of shipbuilders and shipyards
