= Ballhaus =

Ballhaus may refer to:

== People ==
- Florian Ballhaus German cinematographer
- Mascha Ballhaus (born 2000), German judoka
- Michael Ballhaus (1935–2017), German cinematographer
- William F. Ballhaus, Jr. American engineer
- William F. Ballhaus, Sr. (1918–2013), American engineer
- William L. Ballhaus, American business executive

== Other ==
- German word to indicate a space for playing real tennis
