= Jet Aviation =

Swiss airline (1967-pres.)

IATA	ICAO	Call sign
PP	JAS	JET SETTER
- Founded: 1967; 59 years ago
- Hubs: Zürich Airport; Teterboro Airport
- Fleet size: 200
- Destinations: Global
- Parent company: General Dynamics
- Headquarters: Basel, Switzerland
- Founder: Carl W. Hirschmann
- Website: www.jetaviation.com

Jet Aviation is a Basel-based provider of business aviation services. Founded in Switzerland in 1967, it provides aircraft management, aircraft sales, maintenance, Government Programs, Staffing, FBO, Completions (aircraft interiors), and charters using its fleet of more than 200 aircraft. Since 2008, Jet Aviation has been a subsidiary of General Dynamics and employs over 4,500 staff across Europe, Asia, and the Americas.

== History ==
Carl W. Hirschmann established Jet Aviation in 1967 as a maintenance organization when he bought the former Globe Air hangars in Basel, Switzerland, and opened the first maintenance facility for business aircraft in Europe.

Two years later, he took over Pilatus maintenance and airline handling operations in Zürich and Geneva. He also began offering aircraft charter and management services to European and Middle Eastern customers.

=== 1970s ===
During the 1970s, the company expanded its operations to the European and Middle Eastern markets, including charters and aircraft management, establishing its first overseas maintenance facility in Düsseldorf in 1975. Two years later, the company introduced outfitting at its Basel facility. In 1979, it began FBO operations in Jeddah, Saudi Arabia.

=== 1980s ===
Since the mid-80s, the company bought existing FBOs in Boston/Bedford, Massachusetts and Palm Beach, Florida. In 1988, the company added an FBO in Teterboro, New Jersey, and acquired Teterboro-based Executive Air Fleet.

=== 1990s ===
Jet Aviation, Basel, and the three U.S. FBOs in Boston/Bedford, Palm Beach and Teterboro were expanded. In 1994, Jet Aviation was granted the right to expand its airline handling services in Zurich and Geneva to provide services to scheduled airlines and IATA carriers. It opened a maintenance and FBO facility in Singapore in 1995.

=== 2000s ===
In October 2005 Jet Aviation was acquired by the Permira Funds, which marked the end of 38 years of family entrepreneurship. Under new ownership, in March 2006, the company announced its acquisition of St. Louis-based Midcoast Aviation, one of the leading maintenance, repair and overhaul, modifications and completions companies in North America. After almost 40 years as part of the group, Jet Aviation sold its airline and cargo handling division in Switzerland on November 6, 2007, to Dnata, the largest supplier of air travel services in the Middle East. Since December 2007 Jet Aviation has also provided line maintenance, defect rectification, and AOG services at Moscow's Vnukovo International Airport.

In January 2008, Jet Aviation acquired US-based maintenance and completions company Savannah Air Center located at the Savannah/Hilton Head International Airport. In Spring 2008, Jet Aviation and Beijing-based Deer Air, signed a joint venture to operate an FBO and line maintenance facility at Beijing's Capital International Airport.

On November 5, 2008, the company was acquired by US-based General Dynamics, headquartered in Falls Church, Virginia. As part of General Dynamics, Jet Aviation operates as an independent business unit within the General Dynamics Aerospace Group.

=== 2010s ===
In 2016, Jet Aviation acquired Avjet and rebranded it to Avjet Global.

In 2018, Jet Aviation expanded its fleet by 28 aircraft, including 15 in the US and 13 in the EMEA and Asia regions. In the same year, the company completed the acquisition of Hawker Pacific for $250 million.

In 2019, Jet Aviation opened an FBO complex at the Van Nuys Airport, which includes a 10,000 square feet (930 m^{2}) terminal and a 43,000 square feet (4,000 m^{2}) hangar with 8,000 square feet (740 m^{2}) of office space, a 30-foot (9.1 m) clearance and a service center for Gulfstream. In the same year, the company completed its purchase of a former Pazos FBO at Puerto Rico's Luis Muñoz Marin International Airport, which it had operated since 2017 under a management agreement.

=== 2020s ===
In 2021, Jet Aviation entered into an agreement with SkyNRG to offer SAF to its customers, and secured a permanent supply of Neste MY SAF at its Amsterdam FBO. In the same year, the company acquired ExecuJet's Zurich FBO and hangar operations, including one close to 5,000 m^{2} (54,000 square feet) hangar and a 2,500 m^{2} (27,000 square feet) hangar, two private ramps at 4,620 m^{2} (49,700 square feet) and 5,760 m^{2} (62,000 square feet) a 500 m^{2} (5,400 square feet) vehicle parking area and a multifunctional terminal for passengers and crew.

In 2022, Jet Aviation began expanding its US facilities, beginning construction of a 40,000 square feet (3,700 m^{2}) hangar in its Bozeman Yellowstone International Airport facility, an 18,000 square feet (1,700 m^{2}) hangar in Scottscale, a 30,000 square feet (2,800 m^{2}) sq ft hangar at William P Hobby Airport, as well renovating 6,000 square feet (560 m^{2}) FBO lobby space and upgrading 4,500 square feet (420 m^{2}) of office space.

In 2023, Jet Aviation signed a cooperation agreement with Donecle, part of which included purchasing automated drone technology that utilizes AI and advanced image analysis algorithms to enable fast and accurate aircraft inspections, including lightning strike inspections, general visual inspections, regulatory marking inspections and paint quality checks.

== Business Jets ==
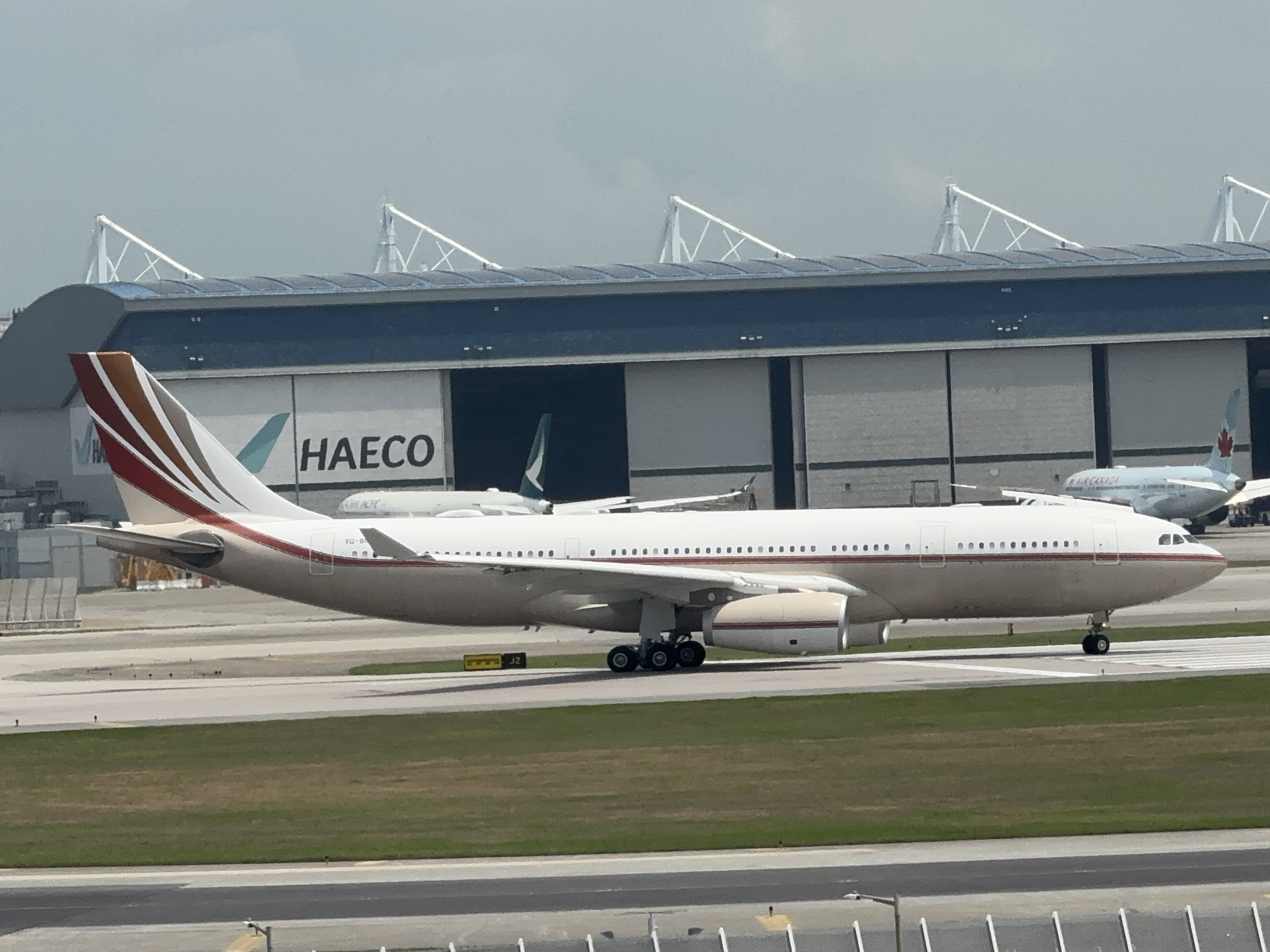
Jet Aviation Business Jet’s Airbus A330-200 VQ-BIG at Hong Kong International Airport

Established in 2002, Business Jets Limited is a branch of Jet Aviation operating in the Hong Kong area. Based at Hong Kong International Airport, it provides chartered passenger services using its fleet of one Bombardier BD-700 and two Gulfstream G550 aircraft.
