= General Dynamics Information Technology =

Information technology division

- Type: Division
- Industry: Defense contractor Information technology
- Predecessor: General Dynamics Network Systems
- Founded: 2006; 20 years ago
- Headquarters: Falls Church, Virginia, United States
- Area served: Global
- Key people: Amy Gililand (president)
- Number of employees: 26,000 (2026)
- Parent: General Dynamics
- Website: https://www.gdit.com

General Dynamics Information Technology (GDIT) is an American information systems, technology, and professional services company that does work for the U.S. government defense sector and is a subsidiary of General Dynamics. Its areas of specialization include secure communications networks, radio and satellite technology, and cybersecurity, and its customer base includes the intelligence and public safety communities. It is headquartered in Falls Church, Virginia.

General Dynamics Information Technology President Amy Gililand speaks during a program at Arlington National Cemetery in 2024

General Dynamics Information Technology was created in 2006 when Anteon International Corporation was combined with General Dynamics Network Systems. Anteon was a systems integration firm that provided IT-related services to U.S. defense entities, and had been in existence under that name since 1996; it was acquired by General Dynamics for $2.2 billion in a deal first announced in late 2005. General Dynamics Network Systems had existed as a division under that name since the early 2000s, and had its origin in GTE's Worldwide Telecommunications Services unit, purchased by General Dynamics in 1999.

General Dynamics Information Technology was initially headquartered in Fairfax, Virginia, where Anteon had been located. The stated goal of the combination was to improve the ability of General Dynamics to supply IT services to the large-sized customers it had in the U.S. government and military sector. By 2008, GDIT had some 16,000 employees.

After its acquisition by General Dynamics in 2011 for approximately $960 million, Vangent's operations, including health and civilian agency support, were integrated into General Dynamics Information Technology.

In 2018, General Dynamics acquired information technology services company CSRA Inc. for $9.7 billion and merged the company into General Dynamics Information Technology. CSRA itself had only been in existence since 2015, but it was comprised largely of the former government services business of Computer Sciences Corporation (CSC), which had been in existence for decades and was known as one of the first and largest software contracting houses and one that had established a major systems integration business with U.S. government and military customers.

The CSRA/CSC acquisition allowed GDIT to expand information technology services to the Department of Defense, the intelligence community, and federal civilian agencies. In doing so, General Dynamics had to improve its original offer in order to fend off a competing bid from CACI. With the acquisition, GDIT rivaled Leidos in size as the U.S. defense industry's largest IT services provider. It also marked a commitment by General Dynamics to be in a services business in addition to the large weapons system contracts it had historically been oriented towards.

As of 2025, GDIT is modernizing the information technology systems of the United States Central Command and for the Centers for Medicare and Medicaid Services.
