= William L. Ballhaus =

American businessman, entrepreneur and aerospace engineer

- Born: c. 1967
- Education: University of California, Davis; Stanford University; UCLA Anderson School of Management
- Occupation: Businessman

William L. Ballhaus (born c. 1967) is an American businessman, entrepreneur, and third-generation aerospace engineer. Since 2023, he has been the Chairman and CEO of Mercury Systems, a technology company serving the aerospace and defense industry. Prior to Mercury, he was the Chairman, President and CEO of Blackboard Inc. He was the Chief Executive Officer and President of DynCorp, a global government services provider, from 2008 to 2010. He was the Chief Executive Officer and President of SRA International from 2011 to 2015, at which time he led the merger of SRA with CSC's federal business to create CSRA.

Throughout his career, Bill has been recognized with numerous awards and recognitions. In 2009, he was named among Forbes’ most Powerful CEOs 40 and Under, as well as Forbes’ 21 Youngest CEOs at the Nation’s Biggest Companies. He also ranked #26 on Ethisphere’s list of 100 Most Influential in Business Ethics. In 2015, he was named to Executive Mosaic’s Wash100 list of the most influential leaders in government contracting. In 2016, he was awarded the Distinguished Engineering Alumni Medal by UC Davis for his outstanding professional achievements and distinguished service to the engineering community. Bill was named one of the Top 50 SaaS CEOs of 2017 by The SaaS Report, one of the Top 10 Most Notable UCLA Alumni in the Business World by Money Inc in 2018, and in 2019 he was named one of the Top 25 Education Software CEOs (#5) by the Software Report. He is a Fellow of the American Institute of Aeronautics and Astronautics and is on the UCLA Anderson School of Management Board of Advisors and the Great Meadow Foundation Board of Directors.

== Early life ==
William L. Ballhaus was born circa 1967.

He graduated from the University of California, Davis, with a bachelor of science degree in mechanical engineering. He received a master's degree and a PhD in aeronautics and astronautics from Stanford University and was awarded the Best Ph.D. Thesis Award. He also received a master in business administration from the UCLA Anderson School of Management.

== Business career ==
Ballhaus was the President of BAE Systems Network Systems, National Security Solutions and Mission Solutions from 2003 to May 2008. He was the Chief Executive Officer and President DynCorp from May 2008 to August 2010. Additionally, he was on the Boards of Directors of DynCorp International and GeoEye.

He has been the President and Chief Executive Officer of SRA International since July 25, 2011.

== Philanthropy ==
Ballhaus is on the board of trustees of the Great Meadow Foundation. He is on the board of advisors of the UCLA Anderson School of Management.

Ballhaus attained a fellowship with the American Institute of Aeronautics and Astronautics as did his father and late grandfather.
