= Zhang Guozhu =

Zhang Guozhu may refer to:

- Chang Kuo-chu (born 1948), Taiwanese actor
- Kuo-Chu Chang, electrical engineer
- Cheung Kwok-che (born 1951), Hong Kong politician
