= SRA International =

Information technology services company

SRA International, Inc.
- Type: Private
- Traded as: NYSE: SRX (2002–2011)
- Industry: Technology and strategic consulting
- Founded: 1978
- Fate: Merged as part of creation of CSRA Inc. in 2015
- Headquarters: Fair Lakes, Virginia (Fairfax mailing address); United States
- Key people: Ernst Volgenau; Renato A. DiPentima; William L. Ballhaus
- Products: GangNet, Geollect, NetOwl, One View Analyst
- Revenue: $1.66 billion (FY 2010)
- Owner: Providence Equity Partners
- Number of employees: 5600 (2015)
- Website: web.archive.org/web/20151015025308/http://www.sra.com/

SRA International, Inc. was an American national security information technology services and consulting company that existed from 1978 to 2015. SRA provided development and operations services to clients in defense, homeland security, and intelligence; civil government and law enforcement; and health care and public health. Its largest market, national security, consisted of the Department of Defense – especially the U.S. Army and U.S. Air Force, Homeland Security, and intelligence agencies. SRA was headquartered in the development of Fair Lakes, Virginia. However, the company's location was often stated to be that of Fairfax, Virginia.

== History ==
Founded by retired U.S. Air Force officer and Nuclear Regulatory Commission member Ernst Volgenau, the company was incorporated as Systems Research and Applications Corporation in 1976 but began operations in 1978. Thus, 1978 was viewed as the founding date. The company then changed its name to SRA International in 1984.

The former Fair Lakes, headquarters building of SRA International, as seen in 2020

The company grew to several thousand employees and went public in 2002 with a successful initial offering. It traded on the New York Stock Exchange under the stock symbol SRX. Volgenau was remained head of the company for a long time. Eventually, former Social Security Administration deputy commissioner Renato A. DiPentima became CEO. However, Volgenau continued on as chairman of the board and majority shareowner, and remained so until the firm's sale in 2015. William L. Ballhaus was president and chief executive officer of the company from 2011 to 2015.

The most known of the company's products was the text and identity analytics tool NetOwl, while others included GangNET, One View Analyst, Orion Magic, Insight Discoverer, and Ramble for Blackberry.

During the 1990s, SRA International was involved in research regarding how to improve knowledge discovery in databases techniques. This research involved such things as cluster analysis and in particular document clustering. In an era before the frequent use of statistical and machine-learning methods for extraction of information from unstructured text, SRA used manually-tuned rules for the task. By the 2000s, SRA was exploring using support vector machine and kernel machines in focusing upon machine learning methods for certain kinds of extractions of meaning from unstructured text.

Along these lines, a customer of SRA International was the National Association of Securities Dealers, for whom SRA built an Advanced Detection System in the mid-late-1990s in order to monitor activity on the NASDAQ stock exchange. The knowledge discovery in databases software created by SRA and used by NASD was called the KDD Explorer Toolkit.

Among SRA International's other customers was the California Office of Homeland Security, for whom they did counterterrorism analysis. As part of this SRA created intelligence briefings about normal political protests and demonstrations occurring within the state, actions that in 2006 engendered criticism from California legislators for being a threat to civil liberties.

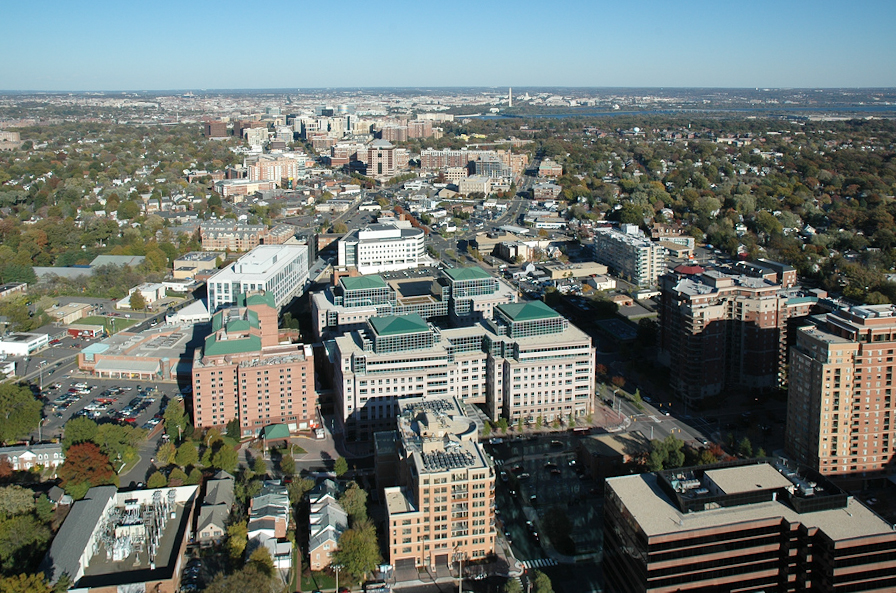
View of Arlington, Virginia from 2010, including SRA International's office there (white building in center left)

During the decade of the 2000s, SRA International passed the $1 billion mark in revenues.

During the 21st century, SRA International gained a strong market in healthcare-related IT services.

In April 2011, SRA International announced its entry into a definitive merger agreement under which SRA would be acquired by an affiliate of Providence Equity Partners in a $1.88 billion, all-cash transaction. While DiPentima was no longer at SRA International, he was at Providence. The deal was completed in July 2011.

By the mid-2010s, SRA International was the eighth-largest company in terms of revenues from federal IT services. It had on the order of 5,600 employees.

In August 2015, it was announced that the government service business of Computer Sciences Corporation would be merged with SRA International in order to form a new company, CSRA Inc. The terms involved the Computer Sciences business paying $390 million for SRA International as well acquiring the burden of $1 billion of SRA existing debt.

That acquisition closed on November 30, 2015, which brought an end to the history of SRA International.

== Major contract awards ==
- September 2004 – GSA awarded $341 million Federal Deposit Insurance Corporation (FDIC) Task Order to SRA to provide comprehensive enterprise-wide IT services to support the FDIC technology infrastructure.
- March 2005 – GSA awarded SRA a $86.4 million Missile Defense Agency Contract to provide IT services to support an enterprise information management system (EIMS) for the U.S. Department of Defense (DoD) Missile Defense Agency (MDA).
- April 2005 – EPA awarded a $148 million ITS-BISS contract to SRA to provide IT advisory and assistance services to support EPA's information management policy, planning, and program management needs.
- May 2006 – U.S. Agency for International Development awarded a $125 million contract to SRA to provide information technology and advisory services to support the USAID Office of Economic Growth, Agriculture and Trade (EGAT).
- November 2006 – GSA awarded SRA a $90.5 million U.S. Department of Agriculture Task Order to provide the U.S. Department of Agriculture (USDA) with information technology services to develop and maintain a new system to improve the procurement, delivery, and management of commodities for domestic and foreign food assistance programs operated throughout the world.
- October 2007 – the U.S. Navy awarded SRA a $79.6 million Task Order to provide program and acquisition management support to the U.S. Navy's Networks, Information Assurance and Enterprise Services Program Office (PMW160).
- April 2008 – SRA won a $108 million contract from DoD to support software development and deployment by providing program management, acquisition and finance support, information assurance, logistics and technical management.
- May 2008 – SRA was awarded a $200 million Blanket Purchase Agreement from the Environmental Protection Agency (EPA) to enhance the capabilities of its scientific research arm—the Office of Research and Development (ORD) Software Engineering and Specialized Scientific Support (SES3).
- February 2009 – SRA was awarded a $200 million Task Order by the General Services Administration's (GSA) Federal Acquisition Services (FAS) to provide ICT services to support United States European Command (USEUCOM) and United States Africa Command (USAFRICOM).
- March 2009 – SRA was awarded a $117 million task order for the Government Accountability Office (GAO) Information Systems and Technology Services (ISTS) Phoenix Program to provide customer support and help desk assistance; server and wide area network infrastructure operations/maintenance and engineering services; security; software development; and enterprise architecture support.
- January 2010 – SRA was awarded a $98 million contract from the Food and Drug Administration (FDA) to work with FDA's Offices of Regulatory Affairs (ORA) and Information Management to design, develop and implement IT solutions that better automate field operations.
- June 2014 – SRA wins $350 million contract to provide IT and Communications services to AFRICOM and EUCOM.

== Acquisitions ==
- January 2002 – SRA acquired The Marasco Newton Group, Ltd., a provider of information technology, environmental policy, and management solutions primarily to the Environmental Protection Agency.
- January 2003 – SRA acquired Adroit Systems, Inc. for its expertise in the areas of command and control, communications, computers, intelligence, surveillance, and reconnaissance (C4ISR).
- January 2004 – SRA purchased Orion Scientific Systems, a privately held company focused on counterterrorism and counterintelligence.
- April 2005 – SRA acquired Touchstone Consulting Group, Inc., a privately held management consultancy with an established track record of serving senior executives in the federal government.
- July 2005 – SRA purchased Galaxy Scientific Corporation, a provider of systems engineering, information technology, and tactical communications services and solutions to the federal government.
- November 2005 – SRA acquired Spectrum Solutions Group, Inc., a provider of enterprise solutions to clients throughout the federal government.
- April 2006 – SRA acquired Mercomms Unlimited, Inc., which specializes in advanced maritime and defense communications technologies for the federal government.
- October 2006 – SRA announced the completion of the acquisition of RABA Technologies, LLC, a privately held provider of high-end technical services to the national security and intelligence communities.
- August 2007 – SRA announced the completion of the acquisition of Constella Group, LLC, a privately held global provider of health consulting services of 1,500 employees, headquartered in Durham, North Carolina.
- July 2008 – SRA announced the completion of the acquisition of Era Systems Group(descriptor) and Interface and Control Systems (ICS) (descriptor).
- January 2010 – SRA signs agreement to acquire Perrin Quarles Associates (PQA), Inc., a privately held environmental consulting firm that specializes in environmental program development and implementation for air quality and climate change.
- October 2010 – SRA announced the signing of a definitive agreement to acquire Platinum Solutions, Inc., a leading provider of systems integration and collaborative solutions for the federal government.
- December 2012 – SRA announced the signing of a definitive agreement to acquire acquisition of the National Security Solutions Group of Morgan Franklin.
