= CSRA Inc. =

Information technology service

- Traded as: NYSE: CSRA
- Industry: Technology and Strategic Consulting
- Predecessor: Computer Sciences Corporation; SRA International
- Founded: 2015
- Fate: Acquired by General Dynamics Information Technology in 2018
- Headquarters: Falls Church, Virginia (Fairfax mailing address); United States
- Key people: Lawrence B. Prior III, President and CEO; William J. Haynes II, Executive VP, General Counsel & Corporate Secretary
- Revenue: 2,580,000,000 United States dollar (2017)
- Number of employees: 18,500 (2017)
- Website: www.csra.com

CSRA Inc. was a publicly traded company headquartered in Falls Church, Virginia that was created in November 2015 as a result of a merger of part of Computer Sciences Corporation with SRA International. It provided information technology services to American government clients in national security, civil government, and health care and public health. Its largest market, national security, included the Department of Defense, Homeland Security, U.S. Army, U.S. Air Force, and intelligence agencies. It was the third-largest government IT and professional services company. It was acquired by General Dynamics Information Technology for about US$9.6 billion in April 2018.

== History ==
CSRA was formed through a merger of Computer Sciences Corporation's North American Public Sector business and SRA International on November 30, 2015. CSC had been in existence since 1959 and was known as one of the first and largest software contracting houses and one that had established a major systems integration business with U.S. government and military customers. SRA had been in operation since 1978.

The company began trading on the New York Stock Exchange under the stock symbol CSRA.

The company was headquartered in Falls Church, Virginia, and had offices in multiple states.

CSRA sold its headquarters to Boston-based Marcus Partners, a real estate investment firm, for $33 million in 2017.

On February 12, 2018, General Dynamics announced it was buying CSRA for about US$9.6 billion.

The acquisition was completed in April 2018, bringing to an end the brief history of CSRA Inc., but leading to the creation of General Dynamics Information Technology.

== Markets ==
- Defense
- Intelligence, Homeland Security
- Civil Government
- Health
