= Kuo-Chu Chang =

Kuo-Chu Chang is an electrical engineer.

Chang completed his master's degree in electrical engineering in 1983 and his doctorate in the same subject in 1986, both at the University of Connecticut. After obtaining his master's, Chang began working as a senior research scientist for Booz Allen Hamilton. He left Booz Allen in 1992 for a faculty position at George Mason University. He has edited the Tracking/Navigation Systems (1993–1996) and the Large Scale Systems (1996–2006) sections of the IEEE Transactions on Aerospace and Electronic Systems, and served as associate editor for the IEEE Transactions on Systems, Man, and Cybernetics (2002–2007). He is affiliated with GMU's Institute for Digital Innovation and the Volgenau School of Engineering. Chang was elected a fellow of the IEEE in 2010.
