= Ernst Volgenau =

American officer, engineer, businessman

Dr. Ernst Volgenau
- Born: c:a 1934 (age 91–92)
- Education: U.S. Naval Academy, 1955; M.S.E.E. U.C.L.A., Ph.D. in engineering, 1966
- Known for: founded SRA International, 1978; Support of George Mason University
- Spouse: Sara L. Volgenau
- Awards: Distinguished Service Award (U.S. Nuclear Regulatory Commission); Equal Employment Opportunity Award (U.S. Nuclear Regulatory Commission); Executive of the Year, 2005 (Northern Virginia GovCon); George Mason medal 2013
- Military career
- Allegiance: United States
- Branch: United States Air Force
- Service years: 1955–1976
- Rank: Colonel, retired
- Conflicts: Legion of Merit with Oak leaf cluster Meritorious Service Medal

Ernst Volgenau is a retired United States Air Force officer and founder and former CEO of SRA International. He was chairman of the board for the company, and rector of the George Mason University board of visitors.

== Early life and education ==
Volgenau came from a farm in Clarence, New York to the U.S. Naval Academy. He graduated in 1955 and was commissioned a lieutenant in the Air Force. Later he earned a master's degree in electrical engineering, and in 1966 his Ph.D. in engineering at UCLA. He taught graduate courses in electrical engineering, computer systems, and operations research at UCLA, American University, and George Washington University for eight years.{

== Military career ==
In the United States Air Force 1955–1976, Volgenau had assignments in aerospace research and development, in the Office of the Secretary of Defense, and as Director of Data Automation for the Air Force Logistics Command. As Director of Inspection and Enforcement for the U.S. Nuclear Regulatory Commission 1976–1978 he managed 700 engineers. He subsequently consulted for the Indian Head Company, a firm with a subsidiary supplied pumps to nuclear power plants in the United States.

== SRA International ==
After retirement from the Air Force in 1978, he founded SRA International and operated it initially in his Reston basement. The company grew to several thousand employees and went public. He was president and CEO until 2005. He was chairman of the board until its sale in 2015.

== Honors ==
He was rector of the George Mason University board of visitors (2007–2012.) The university's Volgenau School of Information Technology and Engineering bears his name. His $10 million donation to that program was the largest it had ever received.

In August 2020, the Nature Conservancy named its Virginia Coast Reserve in honor of multiple gifts by the Volgenau family over 30 years.
