= Lawrence B. Prior =

American businessman

Lawrence B. Prior, III
- Education: Loyola Marymount University; Edmund A. Walsh School of Foreign Service
- Employer: CSRA Inc.
- Title: President and Chief Executive Officer
- Spouse: Mary
- Children: 2

Lawrence B. Prior is an American businessman who has also served in the US military, and worked in public administration.

== Early life and education ==
Prior grew up in the Los Angeles area, graduating from Redondo Union High School. He earned a bachelor's degree in biology from Loyola Marymount University in 1973 and a Master of Arts degree in security studies from the Edmund A. Walsh School of Foreign Service at Georgetown University in 1983.

== Career ==
Prior began his career in the United States Marine Corps, serving as a Marine Corps Intelligence officer for 11 years. He was also a senior analyst with the Office of Naval Intelligence and staff member on the House Permanent Select Committee on Intelligence. In 1992 he moved to the private sector and joined TRW Avionics & Surveillance Group, where he served as vice president for business development, then vice president and general manager for TRW Tactical Systems Division.

Prior returned to the public sector in July 1996, when he was hired to succeed George Stephany as the chief administrative officer of San Diego County, California. Prior remained in San Diego and joined LightPointe Communications, rising to the position of chief financial officer and interim CEO by September 2004, when he then moved to SAIC as senior vice president, Federal Systems and worked his way up to COO.

Prior left SAIC in June 2009 to become the president and COO of ManTech International, a large scale integrator. He was also elected as director of the company in June 2009.

Prior resigned from his position at ManTech International to join BAE Systems Inc. in July 2010 as executive vice president, Service Sectors. In January 2013, it was announced that Prior had resigned from BAE Systems Inc., effective in March 2013.

Prior then served as vice president and general manager of the Defense and Intelligence Group in CSC's NPS, providing next-generation technology solutions and mission services to the U.S. Department of Defense and intelligence community. In December 2014, Prior was appointed executive vice president and general manager of CSC's North American Public Sector, a $4.1 billion business unite that provided IT, business operations and specialized engineering services for local, state and federal government clients across North America.

On November 30, 2015, Prior became the first president and CEO of CSRA, Inc. – a merger of CSC's North American Public Sector business and SRA International.

Prior is currently an Operating Executive for The Carlyle Group focused on the aerospace, defense and government sectors. He is based in Washington, DC and serves on the Board of Directors of Novetta.

Prior serves as a member of the board of directors for the National Defense Industrial Association (NDIA), the Intelligence National Security Alliance (INSA) and the Northern Virginia Technology Council (NVTC).

== Marriage and children ==
Prior and his wife Mary have two daughters, Megan and Emily.
