= Dedrone Holdings =

US counter-drone technology company

- Industry: Counter-drone technologies
- Founded: 2014; 12 years ago
- Founder: Ingo Seebach; Joerg Lamprecht; Rene Seeber
- Headquarters: Sterling, Virginia, United States
- Owner: Axon (2024–present)
- Website: dedrone.com

Dedrone Holdings is an American company in Sterling, Virginia, which develops counter-drone and counter-unmanned aerial system (C-UAS) technology. Dedrone software and hardware allow the detection of radio frequencies, video feeds, and other drone electronic signatures. In October 2024, Axon Enterprise completed the acquisition of the company. According to TechCrunch, Dedrone is used by military forces worldwide. The company was founded in 2014 by Ingo Seebach, Joerg Lamprecht, and Rene Seeber.

== History ==
In February 2014, Seebach, Lamprecht, and Seeber founded Dedrone to produce counter-UAS technologies. Dedrone's first sensor named "Multi-Sensor Drone Warning System" and accompanying software "DroneTracker" entered the market in January 2015.

Dedrone identifies a drone without decoding telemetry data but rather by recognizing specific radio frequency (RF) protocols by drone model as a means of drone identification. In 2015, 52 unauthorized drones were detected in 26 days by Dedrone products over military facilities in or near Washington, D.C. A month later, another 43 unauthorized drones were spotted over a U.S. military facility in Virginia. In 2016, Dedrone moved their corporate headquarters from Kassel, Germany to San Francisco, and won the Cisco Innovation Award. Also in 2016, Dedrone provided anti-drone security for the World Economic Forum in Davos. In 2020, the founders began to step back and offered the CEO position to Aaditiya Devarakondra. Seebach remains active in the business as COO while Lamprecht acts as Executive Chairman and a board member. In November 2022, Dedrone started using cameras made by Axis Communications, a surveillance-focused network connectivity company based in Sweden.

=== Funding ===
In April 2015, Dedrone received $3 million in seed funding from venture firm Target Partners. In May 2016, the company raised $10 million and in May 2017 $15 million. In 2021–2022 Dedrone closed Series C & C-1 rounds of investing led by Axon Enterprise receiving $60.5 million.

=== Certifications ===
In 2019, Dedrone's counter-drone technology was approved by the U.K. government Centre for the Protection of National Infrastructure. It was the first official validation of counter-drone technology in the United Kingdom.
