= NetOwl =

- Industry: Software
- Headquarters: Falls Church, Virginia
- Products: NetOwl Extractor, NetOwl NameMatcher, NetOwl EntityMatcher
- Website: https://www.netowl.com/

NetOwl is a suite of multilingual text and identity analytics products that analyze big data in the form of text data – reports, web, social media, etc. – as well as structured entity data about people, organizations, places, and things.

NetOwl utilizes artificial intelligence (AI)-based approaches, including natural language processing (NLP), machine learning (ML), and computational linguistics, to extract entities, relationships, and events; to perform sentiment analysis; to assign latitude/longitude to geographical references in text; to translate names written in foreign languages; and to perform name matching and entity resolution. NetOwl's uses include semantic search and discovery, geospatial analysis, intelligence analysis, content enrichment, compliance monitoring, cyber threat monitoring, risk management, and bioinformatics.

== History ==
The first NetOwl product was NetOwl Extractor, which was initially released in 1996. Since then, Extractor has added many new capabilities, including relationship and event extraction, categorization, name translation, geotagging, and sentiment analysis, as well as entity extraction in other languages. Other products were added later to the NetOwl suite, namely NameMatcher and EntityMatcher.

NetOwl has participated in several 3rd party-sponsored text and entity analytics software benchmarking events. NetOwl Extractor was the top-scoring named entity extraction system at the DARPA-sponsored Message Understanding Conference MUC-6 and the top-scoring link and event extraction system in MUC-7. It was also the top-scoring system at several of the NIST-sponsored Automatic Content Extraction (ACE) evaluation tasks. NetOwl NameMatcher was the top-scoring system at the MITRE Challenge for Multicultural Person Name Matching.

== Products ==
The NetOwl suite includes, among others, the following text and entity analytics products:

=== Text Analytics ===
NetOwl Extractor performs entity extraction from unstructured texts using natural language processing (NLP), machine learning (ML), and computational linguistics. Extractor also performs semantic relationship and event extraction as well as geotagging of text. It is used for a variety of data sources including both traditional sources (e.g., news, reports, web pages, email) and social media (e.g., Twitter, Facebook, chats, blogs). It has been integrated with a number of 3rd party analytical tools such as Esri ArcGIS.

=== Identity Analytics ===
NetOwl NameMatcher and EntityMatcher perform name matching and entity resolution for large multicultural and multilingual entity databases using machine learning (ML) and computational linguistics approaches. They are used for applications such as anti–money laundering (AML), watch lists, regulatory compliance, fraud detection, etc.

== See also ==
- Knowledge extraction
- Text mining
- Data mining
- Computational linguistics
- Named entity recognition
- Unstructured data
- Document classification
