= Volgenau School of Engineering =

Constituent college of George Mason University

Coordinates: 38°49′39″N 77°18′18.7″W

The Volgenau School of Engineering is part of the George Mason University College of Engineering and Computing. Based in the Fairfax campus of George Mason University in the Commonwealth of Virginia, the Volgenau School offers programs at the B.S., M.S., and Ph.D. levels.

Established in 1985, the Volgenau School of Engineering was the first engineering school in the United States to focus its scholarship primarily on information technology-based engineering. It was also the first school to offer a doctoral degree in information technology and remains the Commonwealth of Virginia's only school of engineering with its main campus in the National Capital Region.

In conjunction with its 20th anniversary, the school received a $10 million gift from Ernst and Sara Volgenau and was named The Volgenau School of Information Technology and Engineering in honor of this gift. This gift enabled the school to create new academic and research programs in bioengineering.

In April 2009, the school moved to a new building. A portion of the building is reserved as lease space for companies who want to work closely with faculty and students.

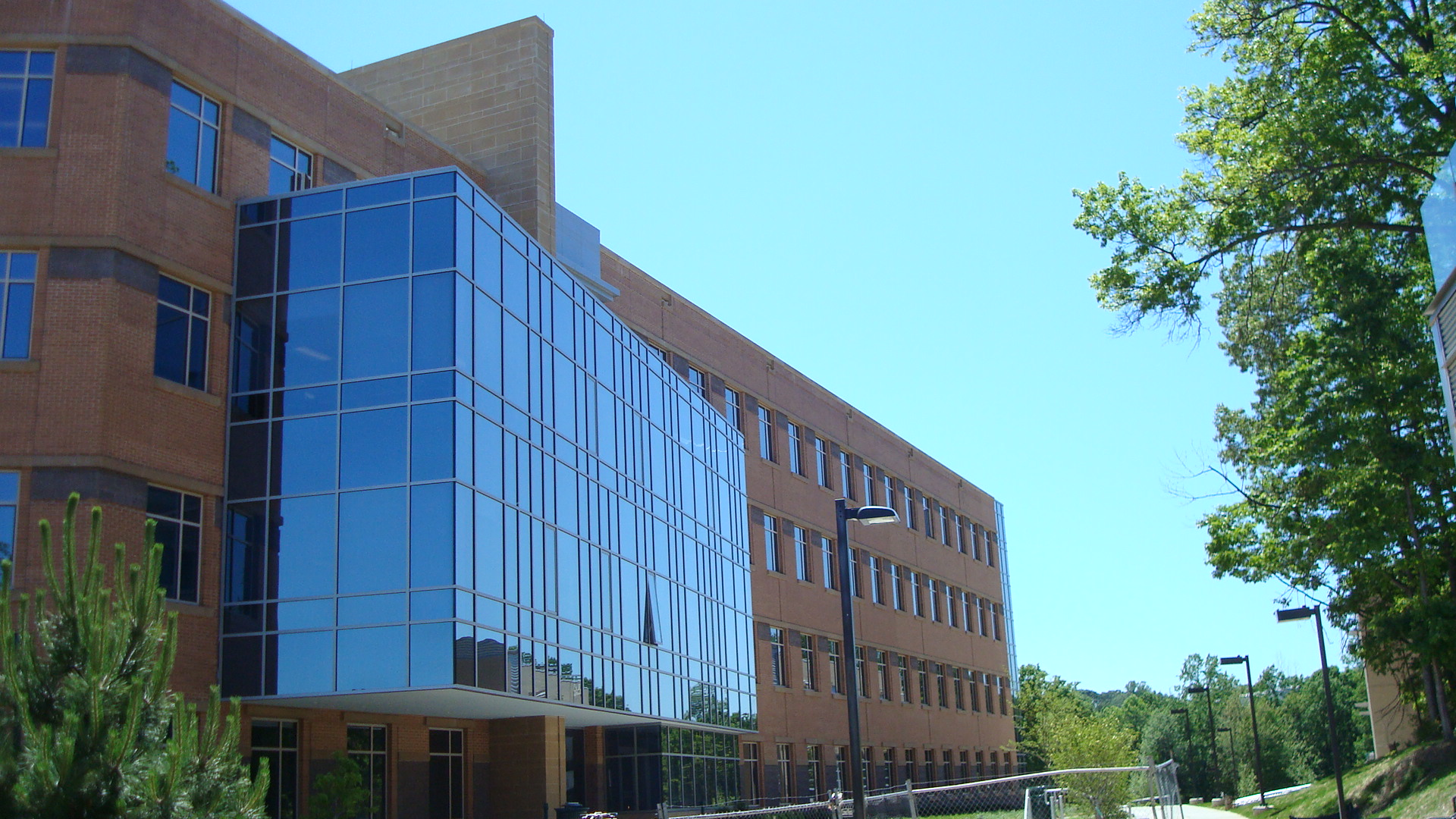
The Long & Kimmy Nguyen Engineering Building, home to the Volgenau School of Engineering.

== Departments ==
- Department of Bioengineering
- Department of Civil, Environmental and Infrastructure Engineering
- Department of Computer Science
- Department of Electrical and Computer Engineering
- Department of Information Sciences and Technology
- Department of Mechanical Engineering
- Department of Statistics
- Department of Systems Engineering and Operations Research

== Undergraduate programs ==
The school offers the following undergraduate degree programs:

- Applied Computer Science
- Information Technology
- Bioengineering
- Civil and Infrastructure Engineering
- Computer Engineering
- Computer Science
- Cyber Security Engineering
- Electrical Engineering
- Mechanical Engineering
- Statistics
- Systems Engineering

=== Information Technology ===
The program is run by the Department of Information Sciences and Technology (IST). It includes web development, computer graphics, information systems, telecommunications, event-driven programming, network administration, and information security. There are currently five areas of Concentrations within the IST Department: Information Security, Database Mining and Programming, Networking and Telecommunications, and Web Development and Multimedia.

== Postgraduate programs ==
The Volgenau School offers 15 MS degree programs, close to thirty focused 15-credit certificates, and six post-master's degree programs including five Ph.D. programs and an Engineer in IT degree program.

=== Master of Science Programs ===
The school offers the following MS degree programs:

- Applied Information Technology
- Bioengineering
- Biostatistics
- Civil and Infrastructure Engineering
- Computer Science
- Computer Engineering
- Computer Forensics
- Data Analytics Engineering
- Electrical Engineering
- Geotechnical, Construction, and Structural Engineering, MEng
- Information Security & Assurance
- Information Systems
- Management of Secure Information Systems
- Operations Research
- Software Engineering
- Statistical Science
- Systems Engineering
- Telecommunications

=== Doctoral programs ===
The six PhD programs and the Engineer in IT degree programs are briefly described below.

==== Ph.D. in Bioengineering ====
Four concentration areas are currently offered:

Biomedical Imaging; Data-driven Biomechanical Modeling; Nano-scale Bioengineering and NeuroEngineering

==== Ph.D. in Civil and Infrastructure Engineering ====
Students may elect to study in the areas of: environmental engineering, geotechnical engineering, water resources engineering, construction engineering and management, infrastructure systems engineering, structural engineering, or transportation engineering.

==== Ph.D. in Computer Science ====
This nationally ranked program is run by the Computer Science department and offers research opportunities in many different areas including Algorithms and Theory of Computation, Artificial Intelligence and Robotics, Computer Vision, Computer Science Education, Databases, Data Mining, Graphics and Image Processing, Information Systems, Languages, Parallel and Distributed Computing, Software Engineering, Security, and Systems and Networking.

==== Ph.D. in Electrical and Computer Engineering ====
This program is run by the Department of Electrical and Computer Engineering (ECE). There are currently five areas of active research in the ECE Department: communications and computer networks, computer engineering, control systems and robotics, signal processing, and microelectronics.

==== Ph.D. in Information Technology ====
This program is run by the office of the Senior Associate Dean. Students may conduct their doctoral research under the supervision of any eligible faculty member of any of the school's departments. A student may select to obtain this degree without a specific concentration or in one of the following concentrations: Civil and Infrastructure Engineering, Information Security, Information Systems, and Software Engineering. Choosing a concentration may impose additional requirements and may reduce the program flexibility.

==== Ph.D. in Statistical Science ====
This program is run by the Department of Statistics. Research areas of key departmental faculty in the program include statistical signal processing, biostatistics, statistical genetics, statistical graphics, and data exploration.

==== Ph.D. in Systems Engineering and Operations Research ====
This newly approved program is offered by the Department of Systems Engineering and Operations Research.

==== Engineer degree in information technology ====
This program is run by the office of the Senior Associate Dean. This is not a doctoral degree, but it allows students to combine advanced course work of the Ph.D. degree in Information Technology with an applied project. Students may conduct their project under the supervision of any eligible faculty member of any of the school's departments.
