= Vangent =

Vangent, Inc. was a major provider of healthcare information technology and business systems for U.S. federal agencies. It held an $18.1 billion contract with the United States Office of Personnel Management to support the Federal Employees Health Benefits Program. Before being acquired by General Dynamics Information Technology (GDIT) in 2011, Vangent specialized in IT services, human capital management, and business process outsourcing. The company was particularly recognized for its work in health informatics, electronic health records, and data analytics.

Vangent traced its roots to Pearson Government Solutions, a division of Pearson PLC, which was sold to Veritas Capital in 2007 and rebranded as Vangent, Inc. The company operated in sectors such as health care, education, defense, and civilian government services, managing large-scale data systems and call centers for federal agencies. Its expertise in secure information handling made it a trusted contractor for programs related to Medicare, Medicaid, and the Department of Health and Human Services. After its acquisition by General Dynamics in 2011 for approximately $960 million, Vangent’s operations were integrated into General Dynamics Information Technology (GDIT), expanding GDIT’s capabilities in health and civilian agency support.

Vangent’s work extended beyond traditional IT services into large-scale program management and data-driven policy support. The company developed systems to streamline eligibility verification, benefits administration, and public health data reporting for various government agencies. Its solutions often focused on improving operational efficiency and compliance with federal regulations, particularly in areas where data privacy and accuracy were critical. Through its analytics and call center operations, Vangent played a key role in citizen engagement initiatives, helping agencies deliver more accessible and transparent services.

Before its acquisition, Vangent employed thousands of professionals across multiple U.S. locations, including major facilities in Arlington, Virginia, and Coralville, Iowa. The company was known for its culture of technical expertise and emphasis on federal contracting standards such as CMMI and ISO certifications. After merging into General Dynamics Information Technology, many of Vangent’s programs and personnel were integrated into GDIT’s Health Solutions sector, contributing to the company’s continued leadership in federal health IT and data management. The acquisition also allowed GDIT to expand its footprint in civilian government markets, particularly in healthcare analytics and customer service operations.

== Acquisitions ==
- In 2006, Vangent (then operating as Pearson Government Solutions) acquired Blueprint Technologies, Inc., a company providing IT and government systems support.
- In August 2010, Vangent acquired Buccaneer Computer Systems & Service, Inc. for about US$65 million in cash. Buccaneer was a firm specializing in IT infrastructure, secure data hosting, and data analytics for federal and state government customers.
- On September 30, 2011, Vangent was acquired by General Dynamics Information Technology (GDIT), a business unit of General Dynamics. The transaction was valued at approximately US$960 million in cash. After the merger, Vangent's operations and contracts were folded into GDIT’s broader government IT, health-IT, and business process outsourcing operations.
