= Hawker Pacific Aerospace =

Aircraft maintenance company

- Industry: Aircraft Maintenance
- Headquarters: Sun Valley, Los Angeles, California, United States
- Products: MRO-Service
- Number of employees: 300
- Website: www.hawker.com

Hawker Pacific Aerospace (HPA) was an aircraft maintenance company which offered landing gear and hydraulic maintenance, repair and overhaul services for all major aircraft types, including all current Airbus, Boeing, Bombardier and Embraer models, as well as helicopters.

Lufthansa Technik (LHT), a subsidiary of Lufthansa German Airlines, acquired Hawker Pacific in 2002. Within the LHT network, Hawker is able to provide an around the world landing gear service.

HPA's corporate headquarters are located in Sun Valley, Los Angeles, California, near to Bob Hope Burbank International Airport.

== History ==
Hawker Pacific Aerospace was formed in 1980. In 1991, Hawker Siddeley was absorbed by BTR Aerospace Group. In 1994, Hawker Pacific merged with Dunlop Aviation Inc and in 1996, Hawker Pacific Aerospace was sold by BTR and became a stand-alone company.

In 1998, Hawker Pacific completed its initial public offering of common stock and used the proceeds to acquire the landing gear, flap track and flap carriage operation from British Airways.

In 2002, Lufthansa Technik acquired 100% ownership of Hawker Pacific Aerospace including its UK location. Hawker was added to Lufthansa Technik's Landing Gear Division to form a global network for landing gear maintenance, repair and operations services.

In January 2011, Hawker Pacific Aerospace UK was sold to Lufthansa Technik and renamed into Lufthansa Technik Landing Gear Services UK.

Hawker Pacific Aerospace ceased operations in December 2024.

== Business divisions ==
Hawker Pacific Aerospace has three business divisions:

- Landing Gear Services
- Component Maintenance Services
- Spares Services
