= William F. Ballhaus Sr. =

American engineer

- William Ballhaus, Sr. (standing) with Arnold O. Beckman of Beckman Instruments
- Born: 1918
- Died: August 16, 2015 (aged 96)
- Education: California Institute of Technology; Stanford University
- Scientific career
- Fields: Aerospace engineering
- Workplaces: Douglas; Convair; Northrop; Beckman Instruments; National Academy of Engineering
- Thesis: Aerodynamic and geometric parameters affecting aircraft weight (1947)

William F. Ballhaus Sr. (1918 – August 16, 2013) was an engineer who worked in the field of aircraft and manufacturing. He was educated at Stanford University and California Institute of Technology. He was employed at various posts in aircraft design and manufacture at Douglas, Convair, and Northrop (chief engineer). In 1965, he was appointed president of Beckman Instruments, where he gradually converted the manufacturing focus from defense to medical instruments. Ballhaus had a keen interest in economics, particularly in the relationship between tax policy and growth, and played a role in the lowering of capital gains taxes by Congress in 1978. He was elected to the National Academy of Engineering in 1973 and, with the election of his son, William F. Ballhaus Jr., to the same institution, they became the first father-son members of NAE.
