= William F. Ballhaus Jr. =

American engineer

William F. Ballhaus Jr. (born January 28, 1945) is an American engineer. From 2001 to 2007, he was president and chief executive officer of The Aerospace Corporation, an independent, nonprofit organization dedicated to the objective application of science and technology toward the solution of critical issues in the nation’s space program.

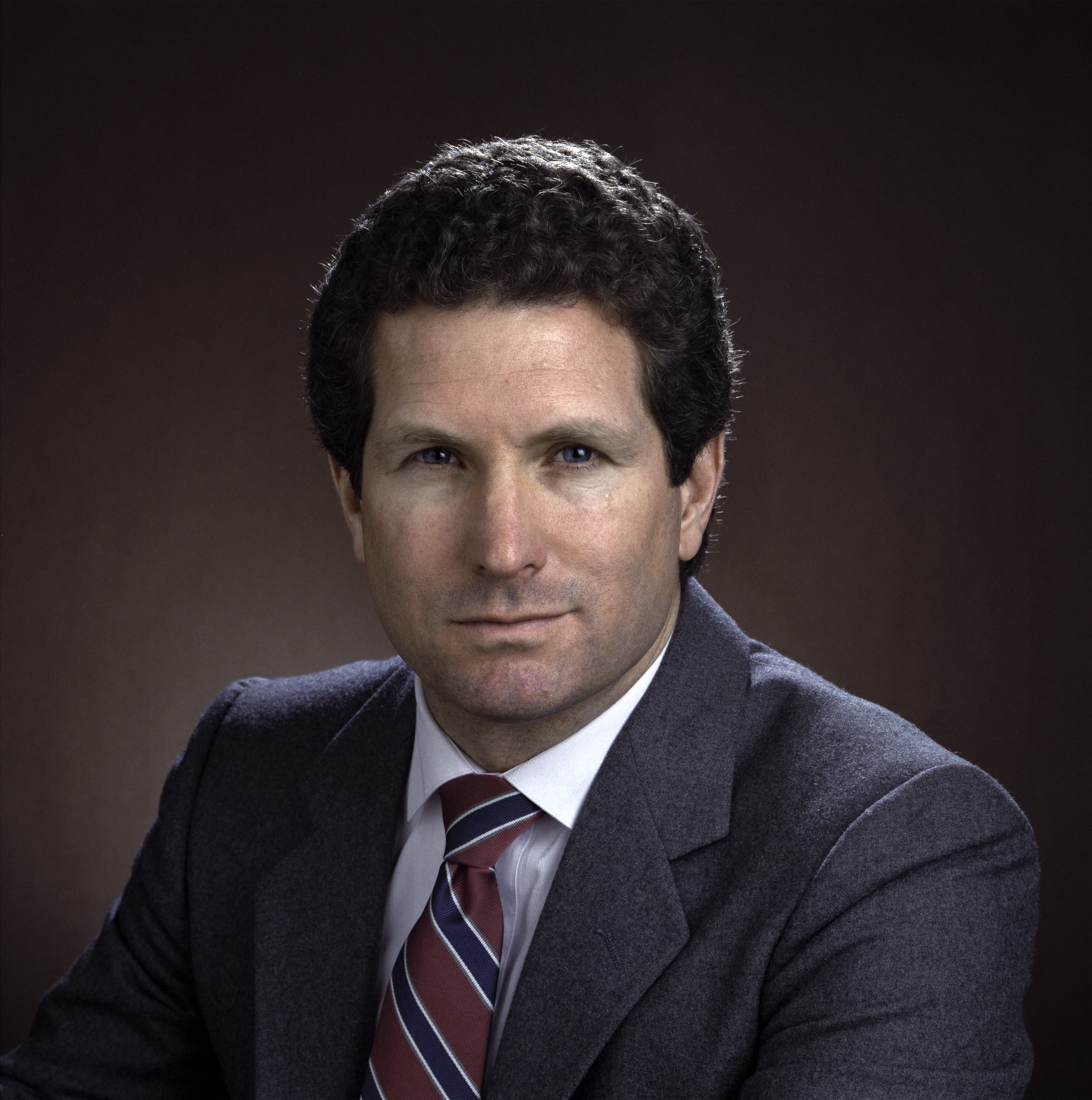

He previously worked for Lockheed Martin Corporation, Martin Marietta Corporation and was director of NASA's Ames Research Center. He holds three engineering degrees from the University of California, Berkeley where he was a member of Phi Kappa Tau fraternity.

With his election into the NAE, he and his father, William F. Ballhaus Sr., became the first father-son members of NAE.
